= Fabrikaktion =

Last major 1943 roundup of Jews in Berlin for deportation by the Gestapo

Fabrikaktion (German pronunciation: [fabʁi:kakt͡sjoːn], 'Factory Action') is the term for the last major roundup of Jews for deportation from Berlin, which began on 27 February 1943, and ended about a week later. Most of the remaining Jews were working at Berlin plants or for the Jewish welfare organization. The term Fabrikaktion was coined by survivors after World War II; the Gestapo had designated the plan Große Fabrik-Aktion (Large Factory Action). While the plan was not restricted to Berlin, it later became most notable for catalyzing the Rosenstrasse protest, the only mass public demonstration of German citizens which contested the Nazi government's deportation of the Jews.

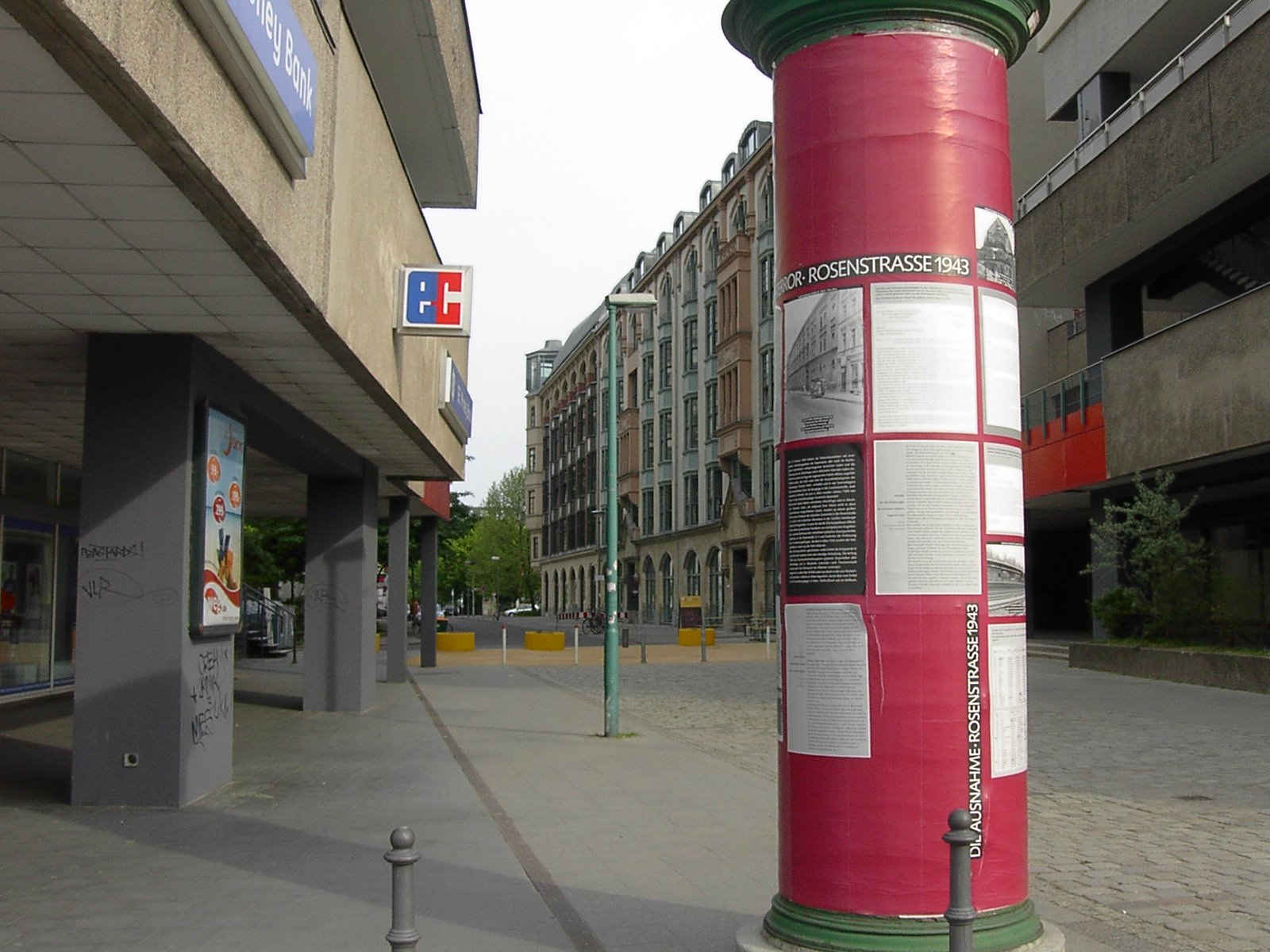
The Rosenstraße today: the building in which the detainees were held no longer exists. A rose colored Litfaß column commemorates the event.

== Situation ==
In September 1942 there were about 75,800 German Jews working in the arms industry. The Nazi government informed factory owners that their remaining Jewish workers, even those married to Germans, were going to be deported to labor camps and that the government would work swiftly to replace them with forced laborers from the east; the owners were to prepare for this transition. The Reich Security Main Office (RSHA) took action planning multiple deportation trains to Riga and Auschwitz. Because the war consumed most of the transportation capacity the deportations were not performed immediately, but the factories were informed that their Jewish labour workers would be "evacuated" at the end of March 1943.

At the beginning of 1943, the plan included 15,100 Jewish workers in Berlin and 5,300 outside of the capital with most of them living in major cities or labour camps. On 20 February 1943, SS-Obersturmbannführer Adolf Eichmann (a main architect of the Holocaust) and head of sub-department (Referat IV B4) of the RSHA issued details on the "technische Durchführung der Evakuierung von Juden nach dem Osten" (Technical Procedures for the Evacuation of Jews to the East). Within that plan the following groups of Jews would be excluded from deportation:

- Jewish partners in mixed marriages
- Married Geltungsjuden (people considered to be Jewish under the Nuremberg laws) living with Aryan relatives
- Jews over the age of 65 unless married to Jews below that age
- Jewish veterans of the First World War carrying medals
- and a list of special persons listed by name

Though these persons would not be deported they would not be allowed to work in the arms industry. They were to be placed into different positions where they could be called in without the factories to intervene in the deportation.

== Action ==
In the majority of other German cities, Jews were notified on February 26 that they were to register the next day with the Gestapo for a check of their labour papers. In Breslau, most of the Jews were arrested at their homes or workplaces in a surprise roundup on the morning of February 27, and were transported to the synagogue. In Dresden, the Hellersberg labor camp was used as an assembly camp. In most parts of the Reich, these actions were finished after two days.

In Berlin, the roundup of ten thousand Jews began 27 February 1943 in preparation of the Fuhrer's 54th birthday on April 20. Those arrested were working in various ammunition factories. The arrested persons were transported to six locations in Berlin for concentration:

- the main hall of the Clou Concert Hall (a former covered market) on Mauerstraße in Mitte district
- a garage in the Hermann Göring Barracks in Reinickendorf district
- the horse stalls of a barracks on Rathenower Straße in Moabit district
- the synagogue on Levetzowstraße in Moabit
- the Jewish Senior Center ("das jüdische Altersheim") on the Großen Hamburger Straße in Mitte district
- the house of the Jewish Community on Rosenstraße in Mitte (where Jewish men married to German women were brought, due to their special circumstances of being in a "mixed marriage").

Forced laborers, even those working under the SS, were taken from their places of work during the Fabrikaktion. A group of Jewish forced laborers working in the RSHA library were taken to Auschwitz following this event, with the two surviving men having been saved by their German wives.

The Fabrikaktion is perhaps especially noted for engendering the Rosenstrasse protest, in which the "Aryan" wives of Jewish prisoners protested in front of the Rosenstrasse assembly camp for the release of their Jewish husbands. During the 27 February roundup, about 2,000 of the ammunition factory workers were Jewish and in an intermarried relationship, which prompted the protest. The Fabrikaktion motivated Germans with strong relationship ties to Jews to become rescuers. German wives felt compelled to protect their Jewish husbands, and were willing to risk more in order to save them as was demonstrated at Rosenstrasse.

The majority of the Jews imprisoned in the other assembly camps were deported to Auschwitz in five transports between March 1 and March 6, 1943. On March 9, almost all of the "fully Jewish" (Volljüdische) employees of the Reich Association of Jews in Germany were arrested with their relatives. They were deported to Auschwitz on March 12. Another transport with "legal Jews" (Geltungsjuden) left Berlin on March 17 for Theresienstadt.

It is very likely that two-thirds of the deportees were murdered immediately after their arrival in Auschwitz. For two of these transports, the numbers are recorded in a document:

"Transport from Berlin, arrival March 5, 1943, total strength 1128 Jews. 389 men (Buna) and 96 women were assigned to work. 151 men and 492 women and children received special treatment (Sonderbehandlung). [...] Transport from Berlin, arrival March 7, 1943, total strength 690 [...]. 30 men and 417 women and children received special treatment. Signed Schwarz, Obersturmfuhrer."

Of those "full Jews" in Berlin who were not protected by a mixed marriage, a small number were spared from arrest until after March 1943. On or shortly after June 10, 1943, for instance, five of the remaining six fully Jewish members of the Reich Association of Jews in Germany—with the sole excluded member being Walter Lustig, who had an "Aryan" spouse—were deported to Theresienstadt, as was Martha Mosse on June 17. About eight hundred Jews also survived the war at the Berlin Jewish Hospital, of which Lustig was the medical director.

== Fugitives ==
Roughly 4,700 of those wanted for arrest were able to escape and go into hiding. This aligns with survivors' statements that they had been warned by their colleagues, foremen, and others—in one case even a police officer—shortly before the action took place. On the other hand, more than half of the fugitives were captured; the Gestapo enlisted Jewish collaborators (Greifer) to help locate them. It is estimated that only 1,500 Jews were able to remain in hiding until the defeat of Germany.

== Literature ==
- Wolf Gruner: Widerstand in der Rosenstraße. Die Fabrik-Aktion und die Verfolgung der "Mischehen" 1943. fibu 16883, Frankfurt 2005, ISBN 3-596-16883-X
- Claudia Schoppmann: Die "Fabrikaktion" in Berlin. Hilfe für untergetauchte Juden als Form des humanitären Widerstandes. In: Zeitschrift für Zeitgeschichte 53 (2004), H.2, Seite 138-148
- Beate Kosmala: Missglückte Hilfe und ihre Folgen: Die Ahndung der "Judenbegünstigung" durch NS-Verfolgungsbehörden. In: B.Kosmala / C.Schoppmann (Hrsg.): Solidarität und Hilfe für Juden während der NS-Zeit. Band 5: Überleben im Untergrund. Berlin 2002, ISBN 3-932482-86-7
- Nathan Stoltzfus: Resistance of the Heart: Intermarriage and the Rosenstrasse Protest in Nazi Germany. New York: W.W. Norton and Company, 1996, ISBN 0-393039-04-8 ISBN 0-8135-2909-3
- Nathan Stoltzfus: Protest in Hitler's "National Community": Popular Unrest and the Nazi Response. New York: Berghahn Books, 2016, ISBN 9781782388258

== See also ==
- Mühlviertler Hasenjagd
