= Angelika Schrobsdorff =

German writer (1927–2016)

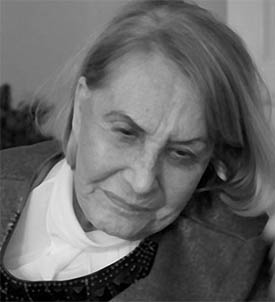
- Schrobsdorff in 2014
- Born: 24 December 1927; Freiburg im Breisgau, Germany
- Died: 30 July 2016 (aged 88); Berlin, Germany
- Occupation: Writer
- Spouse: Claude Lanzmann (m. 1971, divorced)

Angelika Schrobsdorff (24 December 1927 – 30 July 2016) was a German author.

== Life ==
Schrobsdorff's was born the daughter of Else Kirschner (1893–1949), an assimilated Jew from Berlin, and her second husband Erich Schrobsdorff (1893–1952), a member of the wealthy Berlin bourgeoisie. Schrobsdorff grew up in Berlin, and in 1939 fled with her mother and sister Bettina (1922—2007) to Sofia, Bulgaria, where she remained until the end of the war. Her grandmother Minna Kirschner was murdered in Theresienstadt. Her grandfather Daniel Kirschner (1864–1939) died of pneumonia in a Berlin hospital.

In 1947, Schrobsdorff returned to Germany. In 1971, she married the French film-maker Claude Lanzmann (1925–2018), with whom she subsequently lived in Paris. Later she lived in Munich for a few years before emigrating to Israel. She lived in Jerusalem until early 2006, in a house on the Green Line near the Old City.

Schrobsdorff's first novel, Die Herren ("The Gentlemen", 1961) caused a scandal and made her famous. She published a dozen additional books, several of them about Bulgaria. Her memoir of her mother, Du bist nicht so wie andre Mütter (1992, second ed. 1994) was a best-seller and was also made into a film for television (1999). It appeared in English under the title You are not Like Other Mothers in 2012.

Schrobsdorff also worked as an actress; she appeared in Der Ruf ("The Last Illusion", 1949) and in several films and television programs about her own life. One of the most famous ones is the German documentary of Bulgarian filmmaker Christo Bakalski named Ausgerechnet Bulgarien ("Bulgaria of all Places").

Schrobsdorff died on 30 July 2016 in Berlin, Germany, at the age of 88. She is buried in the Jewish Weißensee cemetery in Berlin.

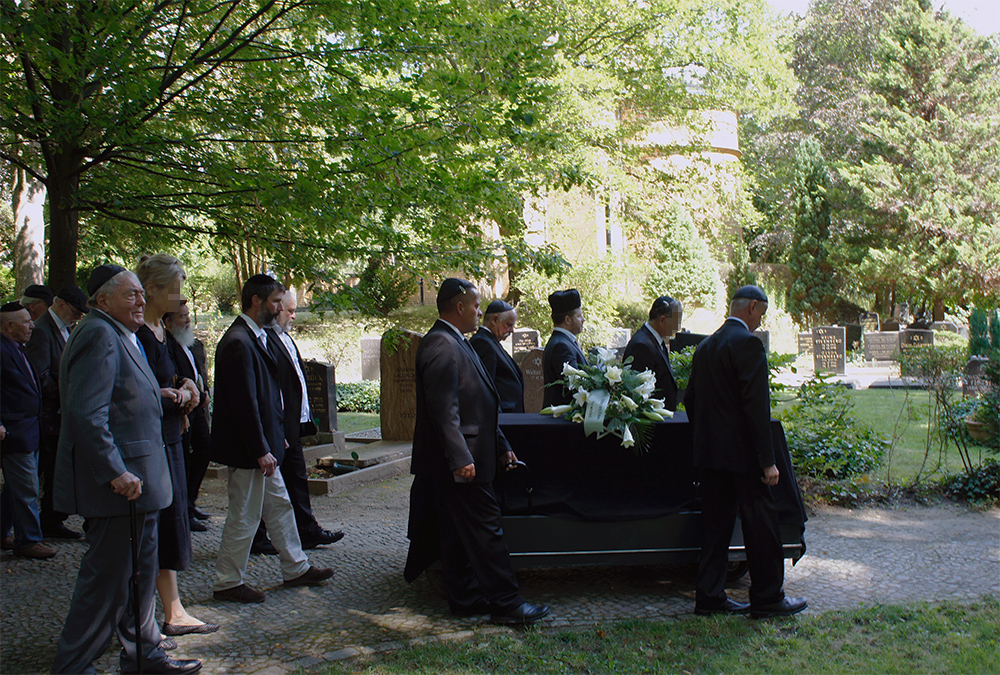
Schrobsdorff's funeral, 2016

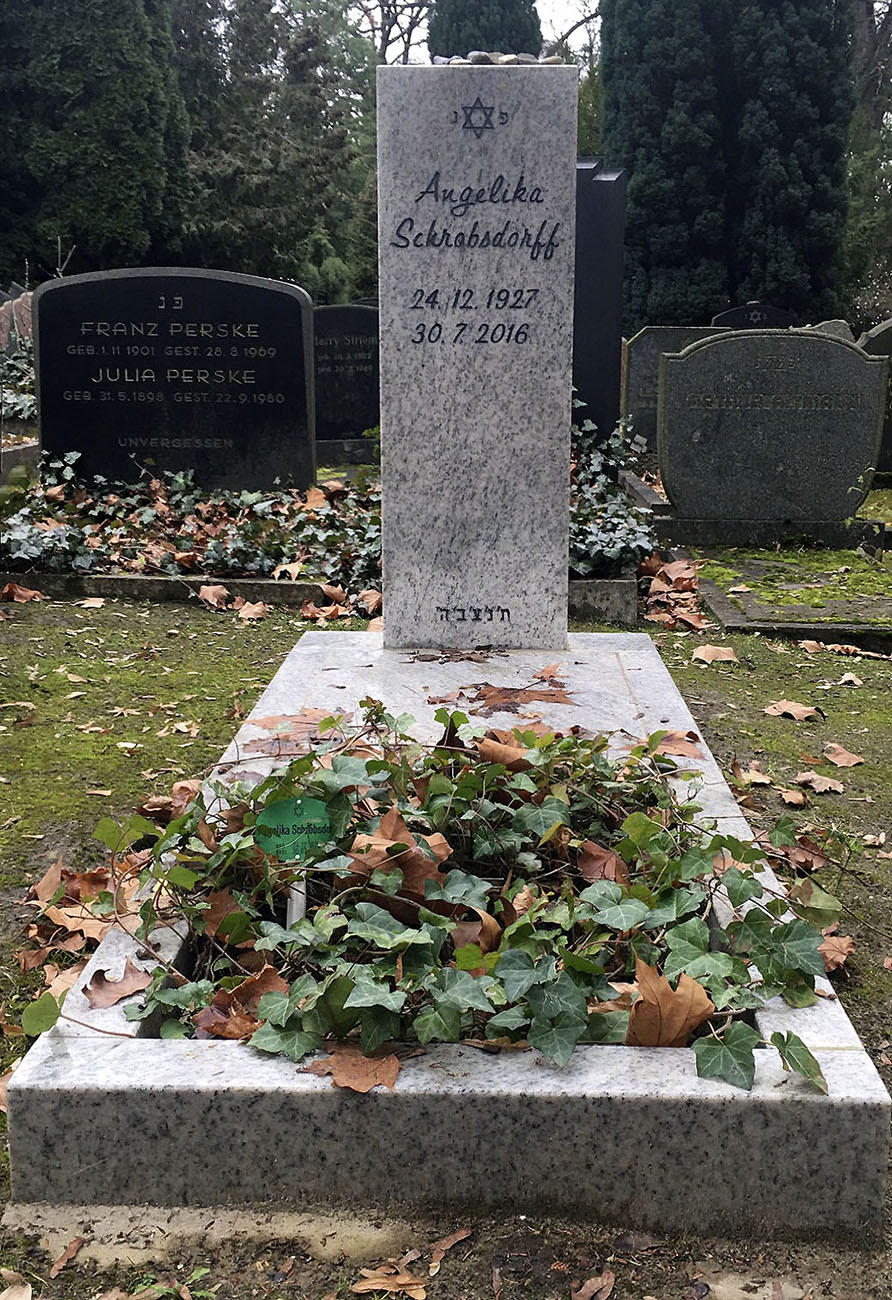
Schrobsdorff's grave

== Works ==
- Die Herren (1961) ISBN 978-3-423-10894-2
- Der Geliebte (1964) ISBN 978-3-423-11546-9
- Diese Männer (1966)ISBN 978-3-442-01935-9
- Spuren (1968) ISBN 978-3-423-11951-1
- Die kurze Stunde zwischen Tag und Nacht (1978) ISBN 978-3-423-11697-8
- Die Reise nach Sofia, mit einem Vorwort von Simone de Beauvoir, Deutscher Taschenbuch Verlag, München 1983 ISBN 978-3-423-10539-2
- Das Haus im Niemandsland oder Jerusalem war immer eine schwere Addresse (1989) ISBN 978-3-423-11442-4
- Du bist nicht so wie andre Mütter (1992) ISBN 978-3-455-06773-6
- You Are not Like Other Mothers" (2012) ISBN 978-1-60945-075-5
- Der schöne Mann und andere Erzählungen (1993) ISBN 978-3-423-11637-4
- Jericho: eine Liebesgeschichte (1995) ISBN 978-3-423-12317-4
- Der schöne Mann und andere Erzählungen (1993) ISBN 978-3-423-11637-4
- Grandhotel Bulgaria: Heimkehr in die Vergangenheit (1997) ISBN 978-3-423-12852-0
- Von der Erinnerung geweckt (1999) ISBN 978-3-423-24153-3
- Wenn ich dich je vergesse, oh Jerusalem (2002) ISBN 978-3-550-08389-1

== Literature ==
- Rengha Rodewill: Angelika Schrobsdorff - Leben ohne Heimat (Biography), be.bra Verlag, Berlin Germany 2017, ISBN 978-3-89809-138-1

== Films ==
- Bulgaria of all Places - Angelika Schrobsdorff and her Family (German: Ausgerechnet Bulgarien – Angelika Schrobsdorff und ihre Familie), documentary, R: Christo Bakalski, Germany 2007
