= Rengha Rodewill =

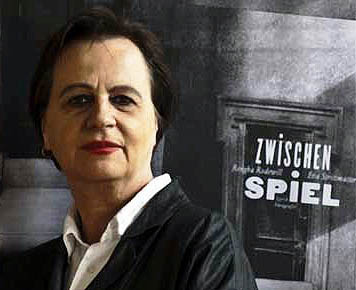
- Born: 11 October 1948 (age 77); Hagen, Westphalia, Germany
- Occupations: Photographer, author, painter, graphic designer and dancer
- Notable work: (in German) Angelika Schrobsdorff – Leben ohne Heimat (in German) Hoheneck– Das DDR-Frauenzuchthaus

Rengha Rodewill (born 11 October 1948 in Hagen, Westphalia) is a German photographer, author, painter, graphic designer and dancer.

== Life and work ==
Rengha Rodewill was born and grew up in Hagen. There, she attended The Dance & Ballet School of artist Ingeburg Schubert-Neumann and learned to paint under the guidance of Will D. Nagel. She attended college in Italy and Spain and, in 1978, she moved to Berlin permanently. In 1998, she opened an art studio in Potsdam–Babelsberg. Her first book, Zwischenspiel – Lyrik, Fotografie and published in 2010, was the effect of collaboration with writer and poet Eva Strittmatter whom she first met in 2000. The tome included many examples of Rodewill's romantic poetry. Until Strittmatter's death in 2011, Rodewill remained in close artistic contact with the poet. During that time, in May 2003, Eva Strittmatter was invited to recite her poetry in the garden of Rodewill's art studio during the Open-Air-Vernissage event. The reading was interrupted by a thunderstorm that later led to the renaming of those poems, Poetry with Thunder. In October 2010, Rodewill's book premiere Zwischenspiel and her photography were displayed at the Deutsche Oper Berlin. The speech at the event was given by the Kristen Harms, the author's creative director, while Strittmatter's poetry was read by Barbara Schnitzler, daughter of Inge Keller and Karl-Eduard von Schnitzler. The same book, which was another collaborative project between Rodewill and Strittmatter, was also launched at the Alte Handelsbörse Leipzig. The event, which took place on 8 February 2011, was organized by the publishing house Plöttner Verlag in honor of Strittmater's 81st birthday. Michael Hametner from the Mitteldeutschen Rundfunk MDR Figaro radio took on the role of the function's Master of Ceremonies. The event also involved journalist and writer Irmtraud Gutschke and actress Jutta Hoffmann who both read Strittmatter's poetry.

== Crossover ==
Rengha Rodewill's works have been displayed in Germany and abroad. She is also an author of many crossover happenings. Furthermore, she is very involved in charitable causes and social events which draw many renowned artists. In April 2006, she was involved in organizing the Julius Stern's Institute of Arts, Gala for the sick children of Israel, Benefizzz for kids. The funds raised at the event were given to Keren Hayesod's organization (Vereinigte Israel Aktion e.V). Actress Brigitte Grothum read the story of Petit Prince by Antoine de Saint-Exupéry while the Master of Ceremony role was given to Harald Pignatelli of RBB TV – Rundfunk Berlin-Brandenburg. In October 2008, Rodewill was involved in the Save the Date for Charity event benefitting The German League of Rheumatism (Deutschen Rheuma-Liga) which also took place at the Julius Stern's Institute of Arts. At the event, actress Barbara Schnitzler from Deutschen Theater Berlin read Effi Briest, a story by Theodor Fontane. In October 2000, Rodewill's work entitled Moments was displayed at Gallery Uffer 55 in Berlin. During the show, jazz clarinetist and saxophonist Rolf Kühn, the older brother of the pianist Joachim Kühn, accompanied by his Trio, provided the musical entertainment. In May 2004, Rodewill showcased her paintings at The Friedrich Naumann Foundation in Potsdam at an event entitled BTrachtungsweisen. The paintings were a part of ‘‘Series in Square‘‘ (Serie im Quadrat) which also included material collages. For the celebration of the 100th birthday of Jewish poet Mascha Kaléko, Rodewill created a two-part art installation. The showcase, Hommage à Mascha Kaléko, took place at the Georg Kolbe Museum in September 2007. Author Jutta Rosenkranz, honored the celebration with a biographical lecture on Kaléko's. In April 2008, crime writer Horst Bosetzky, who wrote the bestseller Brennholz für Kartoffelschalen, read from this book. The event took place in connection with a presentation of a personal check for Children's Clinic in Berlin (Josephinchen des St. Joseph Krankenhaus Berlin-Tempelhof). The acknowledgment speech was given by Sibylle-Anka Klotz who served as the Berlin's Health and Social Services Director at the time. In September 2009, author and singer Gisela May presented her book Es wechseln die Zeiten at the Children's Clinic (Kinderklinik des St. Joseph Krankenhaus) in connection with Rengha Rodewill's charity, Benefiz für Spatz. The Master of Ceremonies at the event was Madeleine Wehle from RBB TV – Rundfunk Berlin-Brandenburg.

Rodewill's art pieces are included in many private collections. Rodewill currently lives in Berlin and works as a photographer and writer.

== Publications ==
- Zwischenspiel – Lyrik, Fotografie. Zusammen mit Eva Strittmatter. Plöttner Verlag, Leipzig 2010, ISBN 978-3-86211-005-6
- Einblicke – Künstlerische – Literarische – Politische. Die Bildhauerin Ingeborg Hunzinger. Mit Briefen von Rosa Luxemburg. Karin Kramer Verlag, Berlin 2012, ISBN 3-87956-368-3
- Bautzen II – Dokumentarische Erkundung in Fotos mit Zeitzeugenberichten und einem Vorwort von Gesine Schwan. Vergangenheitsverlag, Berlin 2013, ISBN 978-3-86408-119-4
- Hoheneck – Das DDR-Frauenzuchthaus, Dokumentarische Erkundung in Fotos mit Zeitzeugenberichten und einem Vorwort von Katrin Göring-Eckardt. Vergangenheitsverlag, Berlin 2014, ISBN 978-3-86408-162-0
- -ky's Berliner Jugend – Erinnerungen in Wort und Bild. Zusammen mit Horst Bosetzky. Vergangenheitsverlag, Berlin 2014, ISBN 978-3-86408-173-6
- Angelika Schrobsdorff – Leben ohne Heimat (Biografie). Bebra-Verlag, Berlin 2017, ISBN 978-3-89809-138-1

== Literature ==
- Annette Gonserowski: Künstlerin Rengha Rodewill auf der Suche nach Harmonie, HagenBuch 2009, S.125–128, ardenkuverlag, Hagen
  ISBN 978-3-93207-087-7
