= Eva Strittmatter =

East German poet, novelist and writer of children's literature

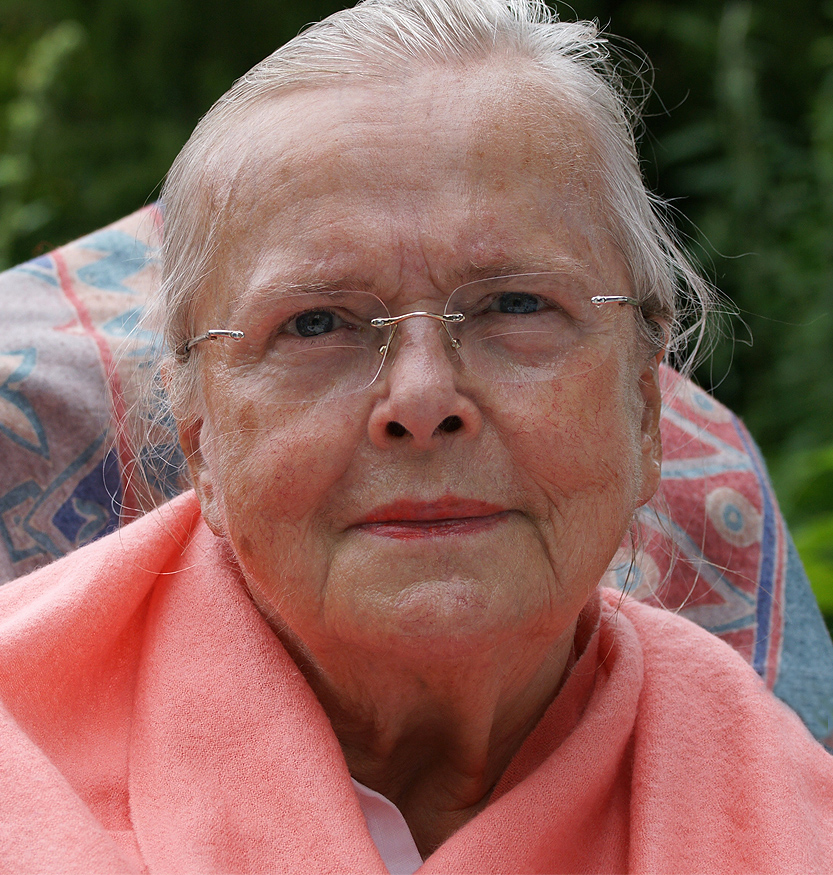
- Born: Eva Braun; 8 February 1930; Neuruppin, Province of Brandenburg, Prussia, Germany
- Died: 3 January 2011 (aged 80); Berlin, Germany
- Occupation: Poet
- Spouse: Erwin Strittmatter (m. 1956; died 1994)
- Children: 4

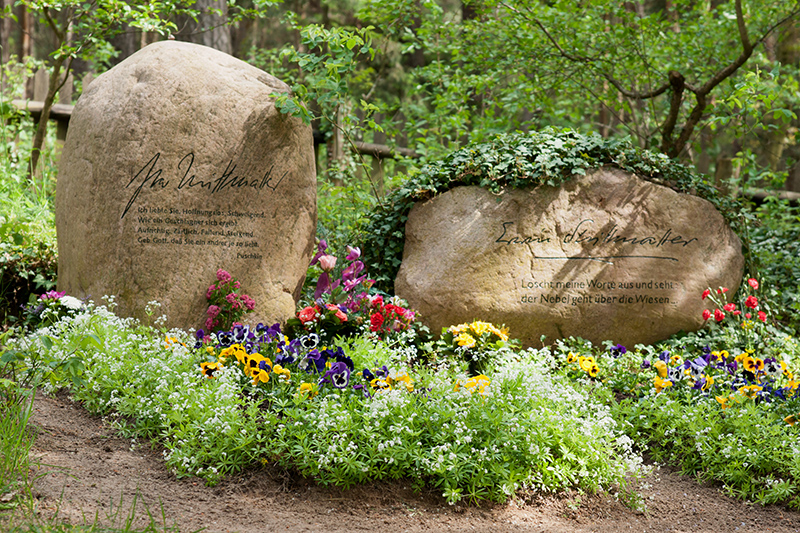
Tomb Eva and Erwin Strittmatter

Eva Strittmatter (née Braun; 8 February 1930 – 3 January 2011) was a German writer of poetry, prose, and children's literature.

Her books of poems sold millions of copies, reportedly making her the most successful German poet of the second half of the 20th century.

== Life ==
From 1947-51, she studied German and Romance studies as well as Pedagogy at the Humboldt University of Berlin. She married in 1950 and had a son, but soon she was divorced. Since 1954 she worked as a freelance writer. She met Erwin Strittmatter (1912–1994). They married in 1956 and had three sons, among them actor and writer Erwin Berner (born 1953). The marriage with Erwin Strittmatter enabled her to relinquish her maiden name, Eva Braun.

The marriage to Strittmatter initially overshadowed her own work as a writer, which did not unfold until she reached the age of 40. Following her husband's death in 1994, Strittmatter edited works from his estate.

== Awards and honours ==
Strittmatter was awarded the Heinrich Heine prize of the Ministry for culture of the GDR in 1975.

== Works ==
=== Poetry ===
- Ich mach ein Lied aus Stille, 1973
- Mondschnee liegt auf den Wiesen, 1975
- Die eine Rose überwältigt alles, 1977
- Zwiegespräch, 1980
- Heliotrop, 1983
- Atem, 1988
- Unterm wechselnden Licht, 1990
- Der Schöne (Obsession), 1997
- Liebe und Hass. Die geheimen Gedichte. 1970-1990, 2002
- Der Winter nach der schlimmen Liebe. Gedichte 1996/1997, 2005
- Landschaft, 2005

=== Prose ===
- Briefe aus Schulzenhof I, 1977
- Poesie und andere Nebendinge, 1983
- Mai in Piestàny, 1986
- Briefe aus Schulzenhof II, 1990
- Briefe aus Schulzenhof III, 1995
- Du liebes Grün. Ein Garten- und Jahreszeitenbuch, 2000

=== Children's books ===
- Brüderchen Vierbein, 1958
- Vom Kater der ein Mensch sein wollte, 1959
- Ich schwing mich auf die Schaukel, 1975

== Sources ==
- Rengha Rodewill: Zwischenspiel – Lyrik, Fotografie. Together with Eva Strittmatter. Plöttner Verlag, Leipzig 2010, ISBN 978-3-86211-005-6
- Irmtraud Gutschke: Eva Strittmatter: Leib und Leben. Das Neue Berlin, Berlin 2008. ISBN 978-3-360-01946-2 Rezension
- Leonore Krenzlin, Bernd-Rainer Barth: Strittmatter, Eva. In: Wer war wer in der DDR? 5. Ausgabe. Band 2, Ch. Links, Berlin 2010, ISBN 978-3-86153-561-4.
- Beatrix M. Brockman: Nur fliegend fängt man Worte ein. Eva Strittmatters Poetik. Peter Lang, Oxford 2013. ISBN 978-3-0343-0948-6
