= Erwin Strittmatter =

German writer (1912–1994)

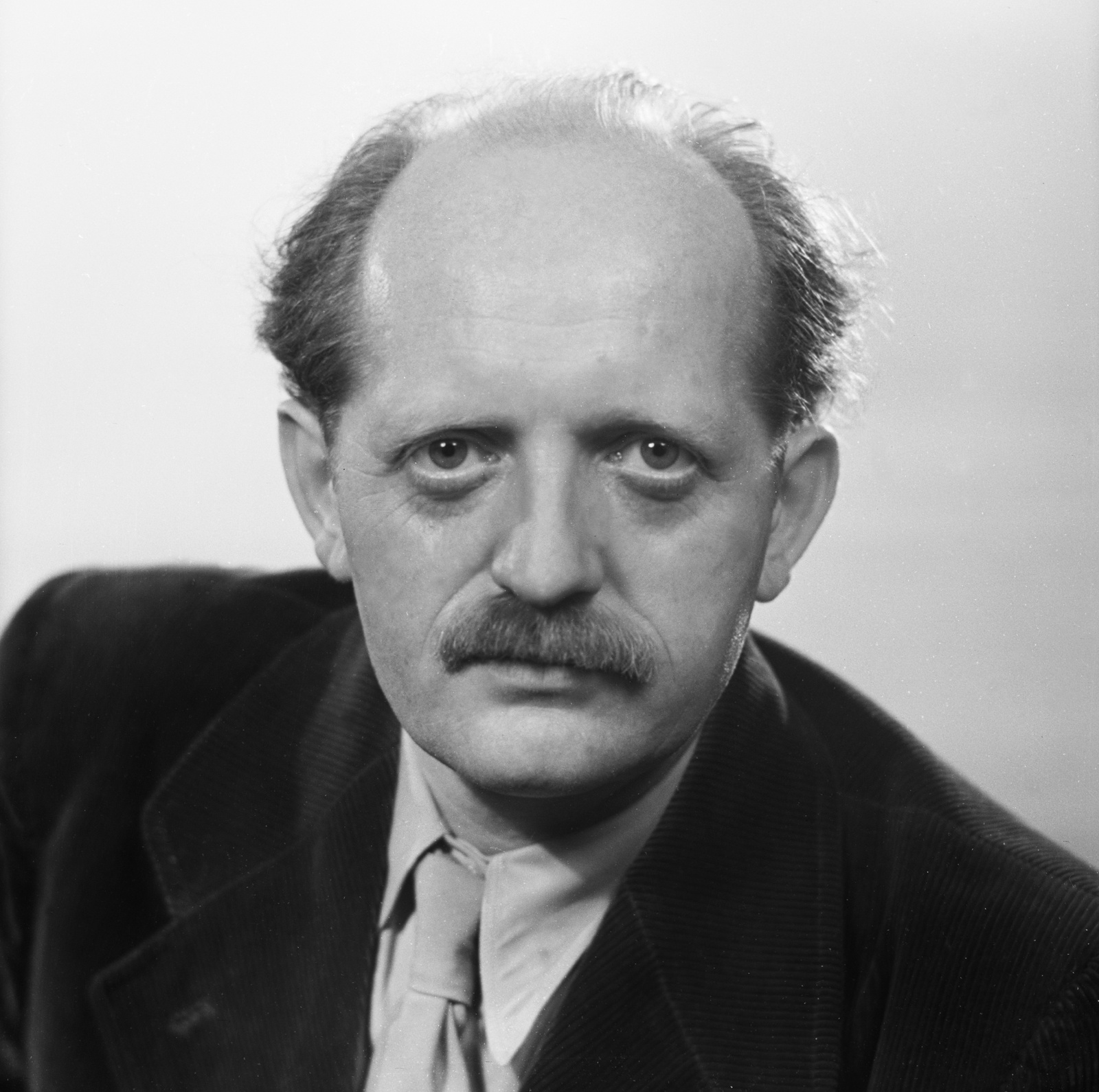
- Strittmatter in 1956
- Born: 14 August 1912; Spremberg, Germany
- Died: 31 January 1994 (aged 81); Stechlin, Germany
- Occupation: Writer
- Notable work: Der Laden
- Political party: SED
- Spouse: Eva Braun (m. 1956)
- Children: 3

Erwin Strittmatter (14 August 1912 – 31 January 1994) was a German writer. Strittmatter was one of the most famous writers in the GDR.

== Biography ==
Strittmatter was born the son of a baker and foods wholesaler. Between 1924 and 1930 he attended the secondary school in Spremberg which has subsequently been named after him. His left his school early due to shortage of money, and at the age of 17 he started an apprenticeship as a baker. Later Strittmatter worked as baker, waiter, chauffeur, zookeeper and unskilled laborer.

In October 1939 he volunteered to the Schutzpolizei, in March 1941 he was drafted into the Ordnungspolizei, He served in the Order Police Battalion Nr. 325, since summer 1942 III.Batl. of the Polizei-Gebirgsjäger-Regiment 18 Strittmatter completed courses in anti-partisan warfare and was deployed in Slovenia, Finland und Greece.

Strittmatter deserted in March 1945 and lived (without documentation) in Wallern/Volary (south-west Bohemia) for a few months. He was interrogated by the US Military in May 1945, but they released him, thinking him a civilian. By June 1945 he was back in what remained of Germany, working for a fruit and vegetable wholesaler in Saalfeld and also for his father as a baker while also working as a correspondent and later as an editor for a newspaper. In 1947, he became head official of seven municipalities. In 1954 Strittmatter began working as a freelance writer. Strittmatter married Eva Strittmatter, who went on to become one of the most successful poets of East Germany, in 1956.

In 1955 he was awarded the National Prize of the GDR for his novel Tinko, in 1961 he received the Lessing award of the GDR. He was a Stasi informer from 1958 to 1964. His 1963 novel Ole Bienkopp was the first widely read work of literature in East Germany to break the constraints of Socialist Realism and offer a tragic hero who criticized representatives of the ruling Socialist Unity Party in the course of the novel.

On 31 January 1994, Strittmatter died after a long illness.
