= Hans Egon Holthusen =

German author

Hans Egon Holthusen (15 April 1913 – 21 January 1997) was a German Nazi, lyric poet, essayist, and literary scholar.

Holthusen was born in Rendsburg the Province of Schleswig-Holstein, the son of a Protestant clergyman. He studied German philology, history, and philosophy at the University of Tübingen, the Friedrich Wilhelm University of Berlin, and the Ludwig-Maximilians-Universität München, gaining reputation as a Rilke scholar with the publication of his Rilkes Sonette an Orpheus: Versuch einer Interpretation in 1937, at the age of 24.

Holthusen was a member of the SS (since 1933) and of the Nazi Party (since 1937). During the Second World War, between 1939 and 1944, he served in the German army. In the early 1960s, Holthusen worked at the Goethe-Institut in New York City, subsequently obtaining a professorship at Northwestern University in Evanston, Illinois, a post which he held until 1981. In 1960, Mascha Kaléko refused the Berlin Theodor Fontane Price because Holthusen was a jury member.

Holthusen died in Munich.

There exists an unpublished 233-page English-language biography covering the first sixty-seven years of his life or so (he died at the age of 83); a comprehensive bibliography of his works came out posthumously in 2000. His personal papers (including manuscripts, diaries, private correspondence (encompassing more than five thousand letters), genealogical records, and a photographic archive) are preserved at the Library of the University of Hildesheim (Universitätsbibliothek Hildesheim) in Lower Saxony (‘The Papers of Hans Egon Holthusen’ — Nachlass Hans Egon Holthusen). The Library of Congress in Washington, D.C., holds a sound recording of the lecture on post-war German literature, entitled ‘Crossing the Zero Point’, which he delivered in the Coolidge Auditorium of the Library of Congress on 25 January 1960 (and which he begins by mentioning ‘the German catastrophe of 1945’, not that of 1933).

== See also ==
- Erich Heller
