= Mascha Kaléko =

German poet

- Mascha Kaléko, c. 1930
- Born: Golda Malka Aufen; 7 June 1907; Chrzanów, Austrian Poland
- Died: 21 January 1975 (aged 67); Zürich, Switzerland
- Occupation: Poet
- Spouses: Saul Aaron Kaléko; Chemjo Vinaver
- Writing career
- Language: German
- Years active: 1929–1975

Mascha Kaléko (German pronunciation: [ˌmaʃa kaˈleːko]; born Golda Malka Aufen; 7 June 1907 – 21 January 1975) was a German-language poet.

== Biography ==
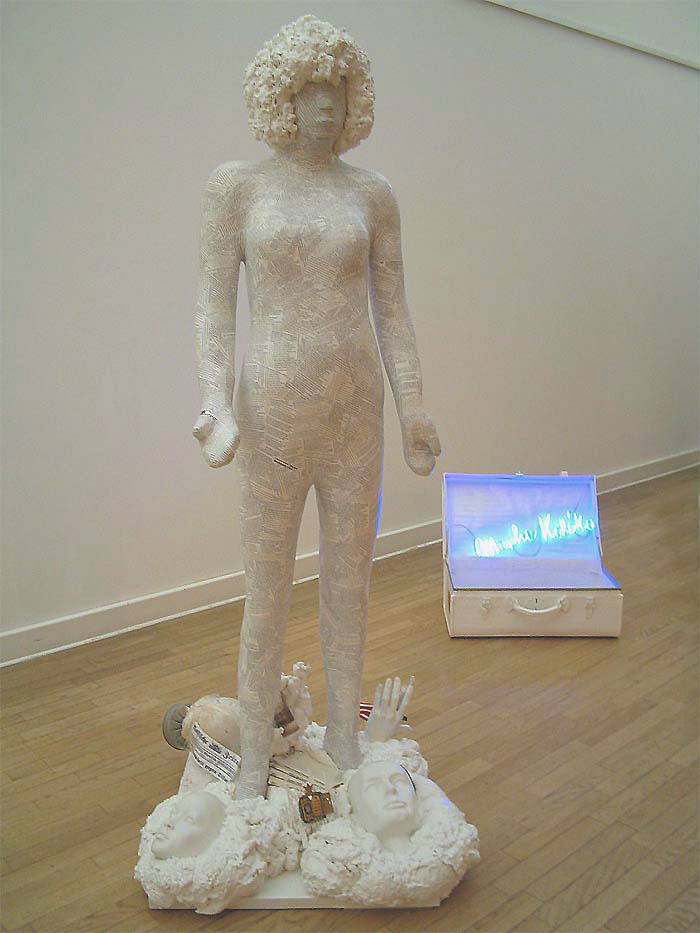
Art installation Mascha Kaléko by Rengha Rodewill, Georg Kolbe Museum, Berlin

Kaléko was born Golda Malka Aufen in Chrzanów, Galicia (now in Poland). She was the daughter of Fischel Engel, a merchant, and Rozalia Chaja Reisel Aufen, both of Jewish descent. With the commencement of World War I, her mother moved with her and her sister Lea to Germany; first to Frankfurt, then to Marburg, and in 1918 to Berlin where her parents married in 1922. In 1928, she married the Hebrew teacher Saul Aaron Kaléko. From 1929 on, she published poetry presenting the daily life of the common people in newspapers such as Vossische Zeitung and Berliner Tageblatt.

In her poetry, Kaléko captured the atmosphere of Berlin in the 1930s. She attained fame and frequented places like the "Romanisches Café", where the literary world met, among them Erich Kästner and Kurt Tucholsky. In January 1933, Rowohlt published her first book with poetry Lyrisches Stenogrammheft, which was soon subjected to Nazi censorship. Two years later, she worked with the same publisher Rowohlt to publish her second book, Das kleine Lesebuch für Große.

In 1938, Kaléko emigrated to the United States with her second husband, the composer Chemjo Vinaver, and their one-year-old son Steven Vinaver, who became a writer and theatre personality in adult life. Steven fell ill with pancreatitis while directing a play in Massachusetts, and died in 1968 at the age of 31. While in the U.S., Kaléko lived in several places (New York City and a few months in California) until settling on Minetta Street in New York City's Greenwich Village in 1942. Her fifth-floor walkup apartment Minetta Street was a safe haven she always remembered fondly. Kaléko became the family's breadwinner with odd jobs, including some writing copy for advertisements. The family's hope of a possible career for Chemjo in the film industry was crushed, and they returned to New York after a brief stint in Hollywood. The Schoenhof Verlag in Cambridge, Massachusetts published Kaléko's third book Verse für Zeitgenossen in 1945 (German edition in 1958 by Rowohlt Verlag).

In 1956, Kaléko returned to Berlin for the first time. Three years later she was supposed to receive the Fontane Prize, which she declined since the former Nazi and member of the Waffen-SS, Hans Egon Holthusen, was a member of the jury.

In 1959, Kaléko moved to West Jerusalem, Israel, since her husband, who was conducting research on Hasidic singing, had better working conditions there. She lacked knowledge of Hebrew and was thus somewhat isolated.

Kaléko died in January 1975 in Zürich, where she fell ill en route back to Jerusalem from a final visit in Berlin. She is buried in Israelitischer Friedhof Oberer Friesenberg.

== Legacy ==
Some of Kaléko's poems were published posthumously, including "Sozusagen grundlos vergnügt", in 1977 in the collection In meinen Träumen läutet es Sturm (In my dreams, a storm is brewing). edited by Gisela Zoch-Westphal, to whom Kaléko had entrusted her unpublished writings.

Various attempts have been made to translate individual poems into English. In March 2010, for the first time, a representative number of Kaléko's poems appeared in English translation in the book 'No matter where I travel, I come to Nowhereland': The poetry of Mascha Kaléko (The University of Vermont, 2010, 112 pages). The author, Andreas Nolte, has selected poems from every phase of the poet's life. His translations follow the original German texts as closely as possible in order to maintain the Kalékoesque content, diction, rhythm, and rhyme. Brief introductions provide additional information on Kaléko's remarkable biography.

In Berlin, a street and a park were named after her, and a memorial plaque was placed at her former residence. On September 16, 2020, Google celebrated her with a Google Doodle.

== Quote ==
From the poem "Mein schönstes Gedicht"

Mein schönstes Gedicht,
Ich schrieb es nicht.
Aus tiefsten Tiefen stieg es.
Ich schwieg es.

Translation:

My best poem ever?
I wrote it never.
From deepest depths uprushed it.
I hushed it.

From the poem "Was man so braucht" (translations: Andreas Nolte):

Man braucht nur eine Insel
allein im weiten Meer.
Man braucht nur einen Menschen,
den aber braucht man sehr.

Translation:

One only needs an island
alone and lost at sea.
One only needs one person,
but this to have is key.

The poem "Pihi":

Vom Vogel Pihi hab ich einst gelesen,
Dem Wundertier im Lande der Chinesen.
Er hat nur einen Fittich: Stets in Paaren
Sieht man am Horizont der Pihi Scharen.
Zu zweien nur kann sich das Tier erheben;
Im Singular bleibt es am Boden kleben.
Dem Pihi gleich, gekettet an das Nest,
Ist meine Seele, wenn du mich verläßt.

Translation:

I once read of the Pihi bird,
The mythical animal in the land of the Chinese.
It only has one wing: always in pairs
One sees flocks of Pihi on the horizon.
Only in twos can the animal lift off;
Alone it sticks to the ground.
Like the Pihi, chained to the nest,
Is my soul, if you leave me. (Note: it seems likely that Kaléko read of the Pihi bird in Apollinaire's Alcools, published in 1913.)

== Works ==
- Das Lyrische Stenogrammheft. Verse vom Alltag (1933)
- Das kleine Lesebuch für Große. Gereimtes und Ungereimtes, Verse (1934)
- Verse für Zeitgenossen (1945)
- Das Lyrische Stenogrammheft (1956, not to be confused with the earlier collection of the same name)
- Verse für Zeitgenossen (1958, not to be confused with the earlier collection of the same name)
- Der Papagei, die Mamagei und andere komische Tiere (1961)
- Verse in Dur und Moll (1967)
- Das himmelgraue Poesiealbum der M.K (1968)
- Wie's auf dem Mond zugeht (1971)
- Hat alles seine zwei Schattenseiten (1973)

Published posthumously:

- Feine Pflänzchen. Rosen, Tulpen, Nelken und nahrhaftere Gewächse (1976)
- Der Gott der kleinen Webfehler (1977)
- In meinen Träumen lautet es Sturm. Gedichte und Epigramme aus dem Nachlaß.(1977)
- Horoskop gefällig? (1979)
- Heute ist morgen schon gestern (1980)
- Tag und Nacht Notizen (1981)
- Ich bin von anno dazumal (1984)
- Der Stern, auf dem wir leben (1984)

== Sources ==
- Julia Meyer: "Bibbi, Ester und der Papagei". Mascha Kalékos jüdische Autorschaft zwischen "Berliner Kindheit um 1900" und Jugend-Alijah. In: Berlin – Bilder einer Metropole in erzählenden Medien für Kinder und Jugendliche. ed. by Sabine Planka. Königshausen & Neumann, Würzburg 2018, ISBN 978-3-8260-6305-3, pp. 139–171
- Julia Meyer: Karnevaleske Blödsinnzentrale: Mascha Kalékos Berliner Gedichte als Kabaretttexte im "Querschnitt". In: Deutsche illustrierte Presse. Journalismus und visuelle Kultur in der Weimarer Republik. ed. by Katja Leiskau, Patrick Rössler und Susann Trabert. Nomos, Baden-Baden 2016, ISBN 978-3-8487-2930-2, pp. 305–330
- Julia Meyer: "Zwei Seelen wohnen, ach, in mir zur Miete." Inszenierungen von Autorschaft im Werk Mascha Kalékos. Thelem, Dresden 2018, ISBN 978-3-945363-64-5
- Andreas Nolte: "Mascha": The Poems of Mascha Kaléko. Burlington/VT: Fomite Press, 2017. ISBN 978-1-942515-92-0. Dual-language book (English/German) with translated poems and biographical information
- Andreas Nolte (ed.): Mascha Kaléko: "No matter where I travel, I come to Nowhereland" – The Poetry of Mascha Kaléko. Translated and introduced by Andreas Nolte. Burlington/VT: The University of Vermont, 2010. ISBN 978-0-9817122-6-0
- Jutta Rosenkranz: Mascha Kaléko – Biografie. Munich: dtv-Verlag, 2007. ISBN 978-3-423-24591-3
- Andreas Nolte (Editor): "Ich stimme fuer Minetta Street" – Festschrift aus Anlass des 100. Geburtstags von Mascha Kaléko. Burlington/VT: The University of Vermont, 2007. ISBN 0-9770731-8-1
- Andreas Nolte: "'Mir ist zuweilen so als ob das Herz in mir zerbrach' – Leben und Werk Mascha Kalékos im Spiegel ihrer sprichwörtlichen Dichtung." Bern: Peter Lang-Verlag 2003. ISBN 3-03910-095-5
- Gisela Zoch-Westphal: "Aus den sechs Leben der Mascha Kaléko." Berlin: arani-Verlag, 1987. ISBN 3-7605-8591-4
