= Rosenstrasse protest =

1943 street protest in Nazi Germany

Coordinates: 52°31′18.5″N 13°24′16″E

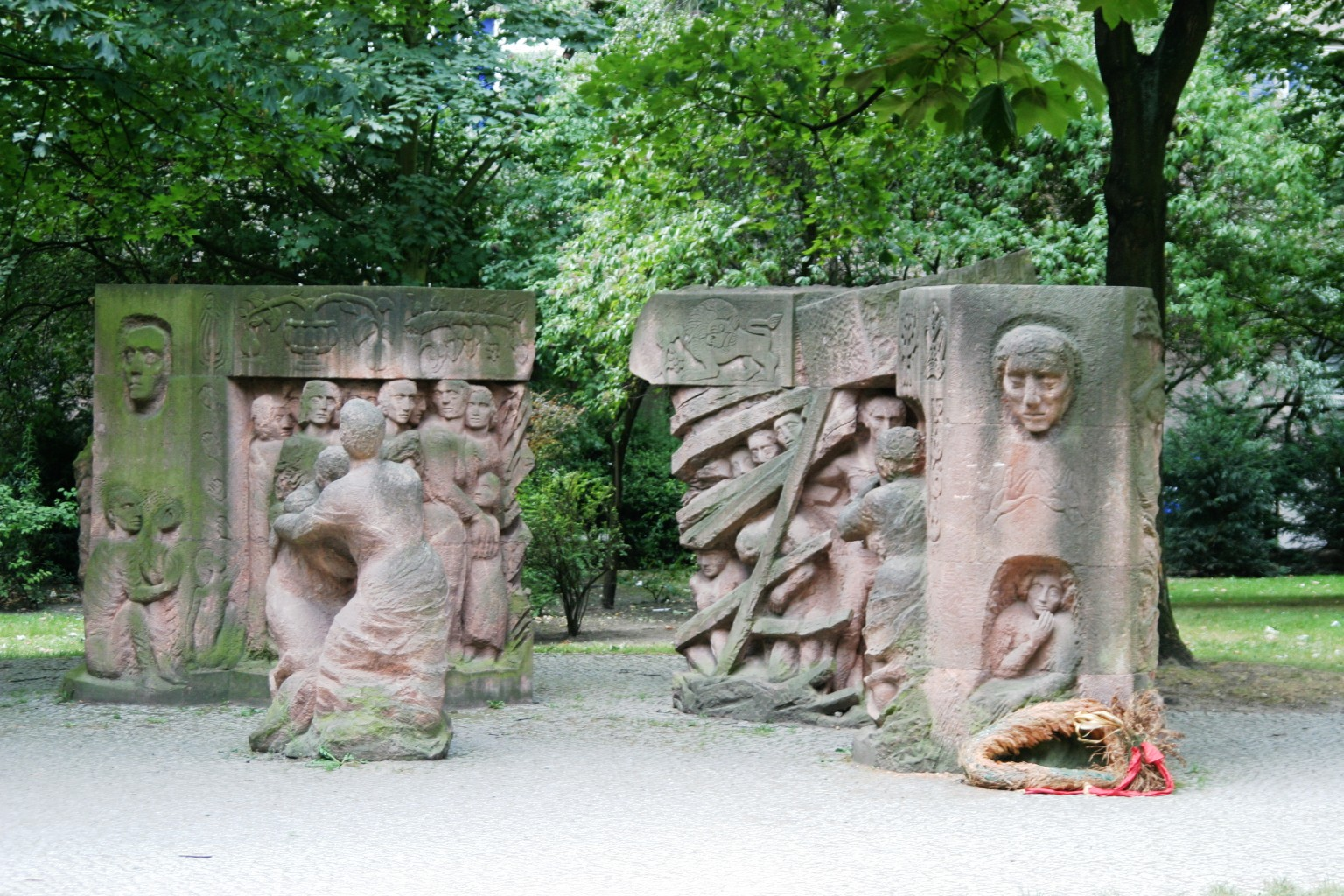
"Block der Frauen" by Ingeborg Hunzinger, a memorial to the protest

The Rosenstrasse protest was the only mass public demonstration by Germans in the Third Reich against the deportation of Jews. The protest on Rosenstraße ("Roses street") took place in Berlin during February and March 1943.

This demonstration was initiated and sustained by the non-Jewish wives and relatives of Jewish men and Mischlinge, (those of mixed Jewish and so-called Aryan heritage). Their husbands had been targeted for deportation, based on the racial policy of Nazi Germany, and detained in the Jewish community house on Rosenstrasse. The protests, which occurred over the course of seven days, continued until the men being held were released by the Gestapo. The protest by the women of the Rosenstrasse led to the release of approximately 1,800 Berlin Jews.

== Context ==
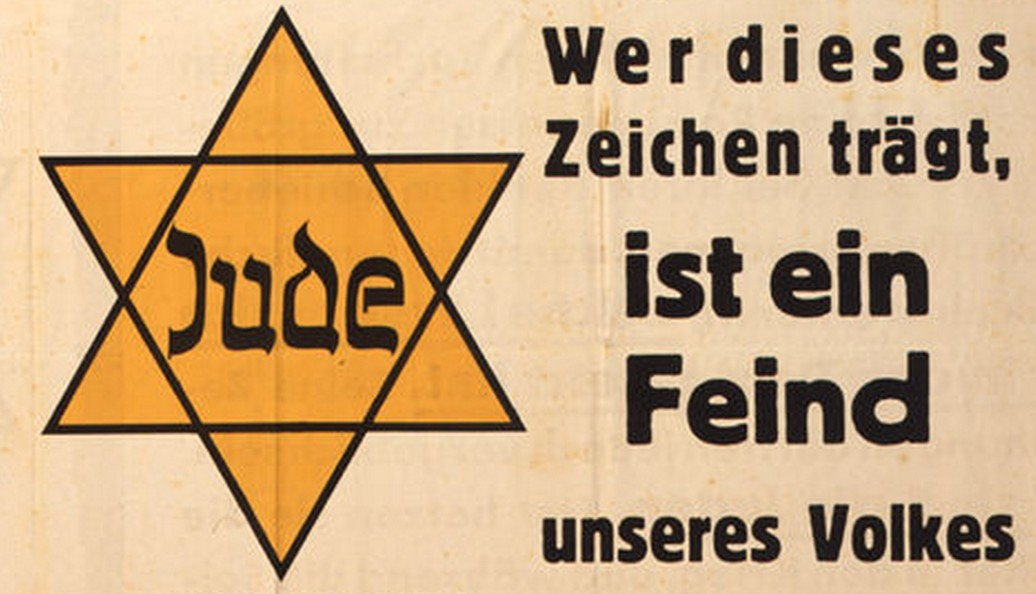
Nazi propaganda stating "Whoever wears this sign is an enemy of our people" – thousands of Jews in non-privileged mixed marriages wore this star of David.

From the onset of his power, Adolf Hitler dedicated himself fully to accomplishing his idea of the ideal government. In his eyes, a model government drew "conscious consent" from its strength in three pillars of authority. In Mein Kampf, he asserts that a government who has mastered popularity, force, and social tradition "may be regarded as unshakeable". Social acceptance was integral to the Nazi party's continued power. Before beginning to deport Jews as a part of the Final Solution, the regime "made a trial deportation of German Jews" and "had their German neighbors studied attentively" who, in a win for the regime, "had hardly noticed" their missing neighbors.

Many non-Jewish Germans also willingly condemned Jews to the Gestapo, the Nazi secret police, often for very little personal gain. It was partially an "environment of terror" pushing Germans to self-police; however, a large number of Germans "went well beyond what... survival demanded to assist the regime." Laws against relationships between non-Jews and Jews implemented by the regime were precedented by reports made by citizens of what they considered to be antisocial or deviant behavior. In 1935, following a slew of reports to the Gestapo in July, the Nuremberg Race Laws "exclude[d] German Jews from Reich citizenship and prohibit[ed] them from marrying or having sexual relations with persons of 'German or German-related blood' at any point in the future. The Nuremberg Laws, aimed at preventing further racial mixing, did not dissolve existing marriages "in deference to the social and religious sanctity and privacy of marriage."

By December 1942, 27,744 intermarried Jews were registered in Germany. Initially, non-Jewish women married more Jewish people than their male counterparts. After the consolidation of power under Hitler, more non-Jewish men had divorced their partners than women, so the majority of intermarried relationships were between a non-Jewish wife and her Jewish husband. These women had long faced social and societal pressure from their communities to divorce their husbands long before the Holocaust. Therefore, when the campaign against their husbands began, non-Jewish women married to Jewish men were already resistant to the outward pressure. As they encountered many Jews in their day-to-day lives, non-Jewish women were not susceptible to "propaganda's abstract evil depictions", causing the regime to turn to force.

In Berlin, the majority of Jews spared from deportation were those in intermarried relationships or those working in armaments factories. Since 1933, these intermarriages were seen by the Nazis as their "certain victims", and the regime tried with all its might to get rid of them. However, these intermarried Jews were woven tightly into their communities, and the regime, cautious of "antagonizing non-Jewish Germans and injuring public morale", had indefinitely delayed their deportation (and likely murder).

== Chronology ==
On January 22, 1943, Joseph Goebbels and Hitler agreed that it was time for the final push to expel the last Jews in Germany. At this meeting, Hitler and Goebbels agreed that there "could be no internal security" until the last Jews living in Vienna and Berlin could be deported "as quickly as possible". On February 18, 1943, Goebbels proclaimed a policy of "Total War" in a speech in Berlin - he argued that the threat of a second "stab-in-the-back" required the "internal security" situation of the Reich be improved.

Just after the German defeat in the Battle of Stalingrad, the Gestapo had arrested the last of the Jews in Berlin during the Fabrikaktion. Around 1,800 Jewish men, almost all of them married to non-Jewish women (others classified as the so-called Geltungsjuden), were separated from the other 10,000 arrested, and housed temporarily at Rosenstraße 2–4, a welfare office for the Jewish community located in central Berlin.

The arrests of Berlin Jews, beginning on February 27, 1943, marked an escalation in the efforts made to remove these Jewish family members from their spouses and families. The 1,800 men were so-called "privileged Jews", a category exempt from deportation and other anti-Jewish measures by reason of being married to non-Jewish spouses, or employment as officials of the Reichsvereinigung der Juden in Deutschland, the Jewish organization officially recognized by the German government for the purpose of controlling the Jewish population. According to Mordecai Paldiel, Holocaust survivor and former Director of the Department of the Righteous among the Nations program at Yad Vashem, Israel's Holocaust authority, "The Rosenstrasse protest embraced hundreds of women at the site where most of the Jewish men were interned (in a building which previously served the Jewish community in Berlin), before being processed to the camps... who gathered every day, and facing armed Schutzstaffel (SS) soldiers, shouted: "Give us our husbands back!""

Despite the media blackout ordered by Goebbels, it was impossible for the state to arrest such a large number of people in Berlin over the course of one day without people noticing. Hundreds of women gathered outside of Rosenstrasse 2-4 and announced that they would not leave until their husbands had been released. Despite periodic threats of being shot on sight if the women did not disperse their protest, the women would scatter briefly, and then return to Rosenstrasse 2–4 to continue protesting. Elsa Holzer, a protesting wife, later stated in an interview: "We expected that our husbands would return home and that they wouldn't be sent to the camps. We acted from the heart, and look what happened. If you had to calculate whether you would do any good by protesting, you wouldn't have gone. But we acted from the heart. We wanted to show that we weren't willing to let them go. What one is capable of doing when there is danger can never be repeated. I'm not a fighter by nature. Only when I have to be. I did what was given me to do. When my husband needed my protection, I protected him ... And there was always a flood of people there. It wasn't organized or instigated. Everyone was simply there. Exactly like me. That's what is so wonderful about it."

The protests were briefly stopped on the night of March 1, 1943, when the British Royal Air Force (RAF) bombed Berlin. It was a public holiday in honor of the Luftwaffe, which the RAF decided to mark with an especially large air raid on Berlin. Ursula Braun, a fiancée of one of the interred Jewish men, recalled mixed feelings about the bombing of Berlin: "On the one hand were fury and hate against the Nazis, who deserved the attack, and on the other side there was terrible misery all around each of us-the screaming people, the hellish fires". One Jewish woman, Charlotte Israel, stated: "I always had such fear about the air raids. But on that night I thought, that serves them right! I was so enraged. I was together with a few other, who got down on their knees and prayed. I could have laughed in scorn! But then I thought of my husband, who as locked up at Rosenstrasse. I knew they would not be able to leave the building." On occasion, people passing by would join the protests in favor of the SS releasing the arrested men.

The RSHA favored shooting all of the women protesting on Rosenstrasse, but this plan was vetoed by Goebbels, who argued that the protests were apolitical, an attempt by women to keep their families together rather than an attempt to bring down the Nazi regime - that there was no way the regime could massacre thousands of unarmed women in the middle of Berlin and keep the massacre secret, and the news of the massacre would further undermine German morale by showing that the German people were not all united in the Volksgemeinschaft for Total War. American historian and professor Dr. Nathan Stoltzfus argued that the need to keep the appearance of the German people all united in the Volksgemeinschaft might explain why force was not used, but:

Nevertheless, had there been no protest on Rosenstrasse, the Gestapo would have kept on arresting and deporting Jews until perhaps even Eichmann's most radical plans had been fulfilled. Differences existed between Eichmann's office and the leadership on the importance of maintaining social quiescence during deportations, but this would not have mattered if the protests during the Final Roundup had not arisen. Power plays surrounding decision-making on intermarried Jews and mischlinge do not so much explain the survival of these Jews as point to the regime's fear of unrest. There would have been no hesitation and no conflict among officials had intermarried Germans cooperated fully with Nazi racial aims ... It was the recalcitrance of intermarried Germans that had made a real issue out of the different positions of the top leadership and the RSHA on the importance of social quiescence in the first place and it was their protest in 1943 that soon caused Goebbels to revert to the position of temporarily deferring these problem cases.

On March 6, 1943, Goebbels in his capacity as the Gauleiter of Berlin ordered all of the people imprisoned at Rosenstrasse 2-4 to be released, writing "I will commission the security police not to continue the Jewish evacuations in a systematic manner during such a critical time [a reference to the defeat in the Battle of Stalingrad]. We want to rather spare that for ourselves until after a few weeks; then we can carry it out that much more thoroughly." In reference to the protests, Goebbels attacked the RSHA, stating "One has to intervene all over the place, to ward off damages. The efforts of certain officers are so lacking in political savvy that one cannot let them operate on their own for ten minutes!" On April 1, 1943, the American Legation in Bern reported to Washington: "Action against Jewish wives and husbands on the part of the Gestapo ... had to be discontinued some time ago because of the protest which such action aroused."

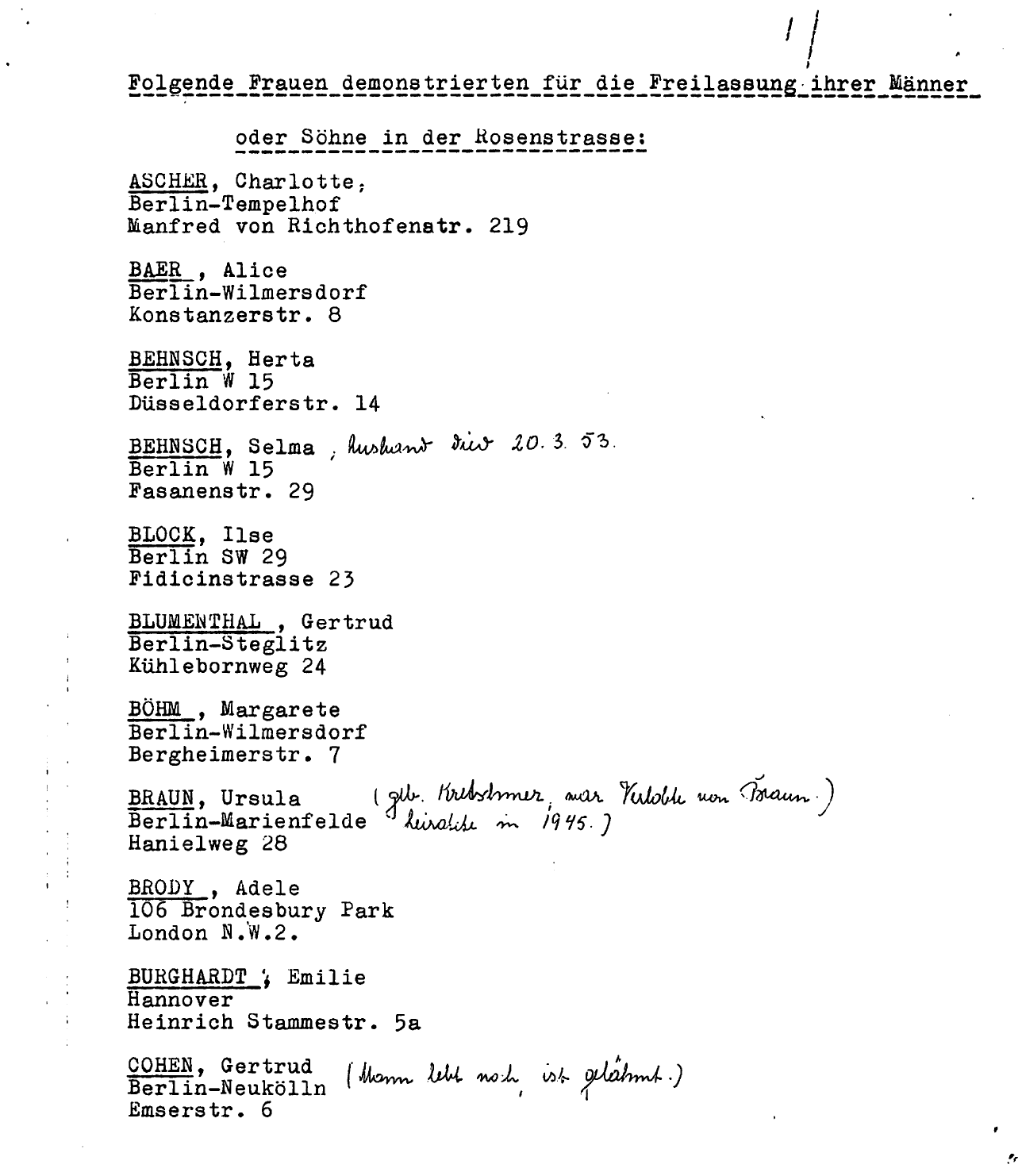
The first page of a list of 67 women from the Berlin Bureau of Reparations who attested to protesting at the Rosenstrasse demonstration

Leopold Gutterer, who was Goebbels's deputy at the Propaganda Ministry, remembered that Goebbels stated if force was used to crush the demonstrations, it would prompt wider protests all over Berlin, which might soon become political, and could possibly even lead to the overthrow of the Nazi regime. Gutterer later stated in an interview: "Goebbels released the Jews in order to eliminate that protest from the world. That was the simplest solution: to eradicate completely the reason for the protest. Then it wouldn't make any sense to protest anymore. So that others didn't take a lesson [from the protest], so others didn't begin to do the same, the reason [for the protest] had to be eliminated. There was unrest, and it could have spread from neighborhood to neighborhood ... Why should Goebbels have had them [the protestors] all arrested? Then he would have only had even more unrest, from the relatives of these newly arrested persons." Gutterer also stated: "That [protest] was only possible in a large city, where people lived together, whether Jewish or not. In Berlin were also representatives of the international press, who immediately grabbed hold of something like this, to loudly proclaim it. Thus news of the protest would travel from one person to the next." Goebbels swiftly realized that to use force against the women protesting on the Rosenstrasse would undermine the claim that all Germans were united in the volksgemeinschaft. Using force against the protestors would not only damage the volksgemeinschaft, which provided the domestic unity to support the war, but would also draw unwanted attention to the "Final Solution to the Jewish Question". Stoltzfus wrote: "A public discussion about the fate of deported Jews threatened to disclose the Final Solution and thus endanger the entire war effort."

Despite the news blackout imposed by Goebbels, the news of the protests on the Rosenstrasse had traveled swiftly by word of mouth all throughout Germany and beyond; in Switzerland, British and American diplomats heard rumors of the Rosenstrasse protests, and in the first week of March 1943, British and American newspapers reported on the protests in Berlin. Goebbels hit back by having the German newspapers claim that the women were actually protesting against the British bombing of Berlin, and far from cracking, the volksgemeinschaft was stronger than ever, stating that charity donations in Germany had gone up 70% in the last year [i.e. a sign that the volksgenossen or "National Comrades" all cared for each other].

Despite his promise to Hitler, Goebbels did not try to deport the men of the Rosenstrasse to Auschwitz again, saying the risk of protest was too great, and instead ordered the men of the Rosenstrasse to stop wearing their yellow stars of David on 18 April 1943. Without knowing it, the women who protested on the Rosenstrasse had also saved the lives of other Jews. On May 21, 1943, in response to a question from the chief of the Security Police in Paris, Rolf Günther, who was Adolf Eichmann's deputy at the Jewish Desk of the RSHA, stated that French Jews married to Gentiles could not be deported until the question of German Jews in mixed marriages was "clarified". As half of the Jews living in mixed marriages in the Reich were living in Berlin, the question could not be "clarified" until Jews living in mixed marriages in Berlin were deported, which thus led Günther to rule no deportations of French Jews in mixed marriages at present. On May 21, 1943, Ernst Kaltenbrunner of the RSHA issued a memo ordering the release of all German Jews in mixed marriages from concentration camps except those convicted of criminal offenses. The same memo listed four categories of Jews who, up until this point, had been spared deportation, including those considered "irreplaceable" by the arms industry; the memo ordered the first three categories deported, but spared the fourth, namely those in mixed marriages as it stated a repeat of the Rosenstrasse protests was not desirable. The men imprisoned in the Rosenstrasse survived the Holocaust. The protests on Rosenstrasse were the only time in which a protest against the "Final Solution" in Nazi Germany had occurred against the regime.

== Significance ==
=== Historians' perspectives ===
There are varying perspectives taken by historians around the globe regarding the Rosenstrasse Protest. In 2003 German historian Kurt Pätzold explained part of what is at issue: arguing that a protest rescued Jewish lives "strikes at the center of the historical perception of the character of the Nazi regime and the way it functioned, and weighs on judgments about the possibilities for resistance." Another German historian, Konrad Kwiet, added that "the successful outcome of this late protest suggests that if similar actions at an earlier stage had been carried out throughout Germany, they might have halted the increasingly destructive course of the German anti-Jewish policy." There are a lot of controversial questions surrounding these perspectives, such as: did the regime set its course, issue orders, and carry them out in every detail, using brute force to have its way if necessary? Or was it tactically opportunistic, improvising its decisions within changing circumstances to maximize its impact? Ultimately, the question is whether the Jews released following the Rosenstrasse demonstration owe their lives to the protest, or whether as another German historian wrote, they have the will of the Gestapo to "thank" for their survival.

Recently, some German historians have set the protest within the contexts of left-wing resistance, Jewish underground survival, and Nazi policies of forced labour and deportation. Some argue that while the non-Jewish partners were targeted, harassed and intended for internment, actual deportation was not the aim in early 1943. Wolf Gruner has argued that at this time the Gestapo excluded Jews with Aryan partners from expulsion, and corrected Berlin officials who tried to remove them. German historian Diane Schulle summarizes this perspective in her essay "Forced Labour": "Gruner…suggests that regardless of the protests, the deportation of mixed-marriage partners had never been part of the plan. The arrests of Mischlinge ["half-Jews"] and Jews living in mixed marriages had been undertaken for a purpose other than deportation: registration." Gruner insists that Nazi directives at that time prohibited the Gestapo from deporting German Jews married to non-Jews. In Gruner's view, therefore, the protest had no impact on the Gestapo, since deportation was not their aim. As evidence, Gruner says that on February 20, 1943, Himmler's Reich Security Main Office (RSHA) ordered that intermarried Jews were to be exempted from the deportations "temporarily". Four days later, a Gestapo order from the city of Frankfurt an der Oder directed Gestapo agents to avoid drawing attention to intermarried Jews. They were instead encouraged to arrest these Jews on other charges including "impudence", prior to sending them to a concentration camp. According to this order, Gruner wrote that "much would depend on the arbitrary behavior of the officers at each location."

As Gauleiter Joseph Goebbels resolved to make Berlin Judenfrei by March 1943, pushing out all persons wearing the star, there was a simultaneous pull from the Auschwitz-Buna camp for slave laborers, as Joachim Neander has shown. In February, fearing that the 6,000 Polish workers at I. G. Farben’s Buna would revolt, plans were laid to disperse them throughout other camps by mid-March, 1943. In addition to the workers needed to replace the Poles, 3,000 additional workers were needed to bring the labor force up to the number promised by SS-Obersturmbannführer Gerhard Maurer, head of Office D II, “Prisoner Employment,” at the SS Economic Administration Main Office. .

Arthur Liebehenschel, also of the Economic SS, made it clear these forced laborers would come from the deportations of Berlin Jews, and that he expected Auschwitz to receive not 9,000 but 15,000 workers.

"As is known to you, on March 1, 1943, the transports of Jews from Berlin will begin. It is herewith stressed again that in these transports there will be about 15,000 healthy Jews, fit for work, who hitherto have been working in the armament industry of Berlin."
Twenty minutes later a telex from Mauerer himself stated that “first, the Buna camp must be filled up to full strength."

Providing slave laborers—who would have to be kept healthy—was a high priority for the Economic SS.

By late February, deportations had reduced the number of Jews employed in the Berlin armaments industry to about 11,000. In order to send to Auschwitz even just 9,000 Berlin Jews ‘fit for work’, never mind the promised 15,000, a significant number would have to come from intermarried Jews. The majority of the 11,000 Jewish armaments workers living in Berlin by late February 1943 were living in “mixed marriages”.

Neander has calculated that supplying Auschwitz-Buna with 11,000 Jewish slave laborers by mid-March 1943 would have required the inclusion of seven thousand intermarried Jews from Berlin. For these 7,000 the Gestapo’s “temporary” exemption of intermarried Jews from the deportations would have ended. Already the “temporary” exemption had come to an end for hundreds of Germany’s intermarried Jews who had been murdered in the Holocaust. A report by the intermarried and reliably-sourced Gerhard Lehfeldt from March 1943 suggests that 9.000 Berlin Jews were to be sent into forced labor.

However, factors in Berlin, most importantly street protests against the deportations of Jews imprisoned at Rosenstrasse, altered the alignment of interests in deporting intermarried Jews. Berlin's Gauleiter Goebbels had both the power and motivation to influence his approach to intermarried Jews in Berlin. Goebbels was engaged in an effort to restructure the German home front for total war under his leadership. He saw that his position and plans to mobilize the German people for total war anticipated more sacrifices, and that these were jeopardized by the Rosenstrasse protest. He intervened to release Berlin’s intermarried Jews arrested in the massive arrests beginning on February 27, 1943 that Himmler identified as an Action to Eliminate Jews from Reich Territory. But only temporarily—he thought of it as another “temporary” stay of execution:

"The people gathered together in large throngs and even sided with the Jews to some extent. I will commission the security police not to continue the Jewish evacuations during such a critical time. Rather we want to put that off for a few weeks; then we can carry it out all the more thoroughly. One has to intervene all over the place, to ward off damages. The efforts of certain offices are so lacking in savvy that one cannot leave them on their own for ten minutes. The basic malady of our leadership and above all of our administration consists in operating according to Schema F [incapable of adapting orders to circumstances. One has the impression that these people, who carry out this or that measure, don't reflect one bit, but rather hang to the written word, whose main value to them is that they thus have their actions covered by orders from above."

-Goebbels Diary, March 6, 1943.

=== Terminology ===
Although the massive arrests of Berlin Jews beginning on February 27, 1943 are commonly known as the "Fabrikaktion", or "Factory Action", this term was never used by the Gestapo, but was instead invented following the war. The Gestapo's code names for this action were "Elimination of Jews from the German Reich" and "Final roundup of Jews in Berlin". Using the Gestapo's terms is important because Jews were arrested at their factory workplaces, at home, and persons seen on the streets wearing the Jewish star were chased down and carted off to be dispatched from Berlin. Goebbels resolved in February 1943, to refrain from deporting Jews working in factories, but to instead make Berlin Judenrein, "free of Jews", demonstrating his intent towards dispatching anyone wearing the Jewish Star.

=== Germany's relationship to the past ===
Two articles in early 2018 in the German press presented contrasting interpretations of the Rosenstrasse Protest on the occasion of its seventy-fifth anniversary. While the Berliner Tagesspiegel on February 27 credited that protest with rescuing two thousand Jews, Der Spiegel on March 2 represented institutions and persons who sharply disagree. In this position, "Aryan" (non-Jewish) partners who demonstrated for the release of their husbands are to be commended, although their protest made no difference whatsoever since their protest coincided perfectly with Gestapo plans: "A decree of the Reich Security Main Office, however, did not provide for the deportation of any Jews living in a so-called mixed marriage, but only the removal from the factories, in order to ‘capture’ [erfassen] them, after which they were to be released back to their homes ... "

The standard evidence for this position referred to by Der Spiegel’s editors is the decree of the Frankfurt/Oder Gestapo circulated by the Administrator for the District of Calau dated February 25th, 1943, as interpreted by Gruner. In 1995, Gruner wrote that "views that such demonstrations could have hampered the RSHA's deportation plans are unlikely to hold up in the historic context." For Gruner, "interpreting the Rosenstrasse protest as rescuing intermarried Jews carries "the danger of dramatically underestimating the regime’s power to dominate (Herrschaft)."

Dr. Nathan Stoltzfus responded to Gruner's comment that "a dictatorship that would lash out in every direction at any sign of opposition would be dramatically less dangerous than one that knew how to use force and terror more instrumentally. A flexible villain capable of strategizing is capable of more villainy than one that must always act according to ideology and plans made in advance."

The Frankfurt/Oder Erlass does not suggest that the Gestapo did not plan to deport any of the intermarried Jews it arrested during the course of its Reich-wide "Removal of Jews from Reich Territory Actions", which began on February 27, 1943. It says in part: "All Jews still employed are to be removed from businesses for the purpose of the collection [Erfassung]. Uppity behavior of Jews in a still-existing mixed marriage, is to be punished by placing them in protective custody with a request for their placement in a concentration camp. This [punishment] can be carried out very unsparingly, but the impression must be avoided that this action is fundamentally resolving the mixed marriage problem at this same time. Unless there are reasons to justify the imprisonment of the Jews who live in mixed marriages, these Jews are to be sent to their homes".

This local order could have had no bearing on the fate of Jews imprisoned on Berlin's Rosenstrasse; certainly it did not stand between Joseph Goebbels, the Gauleiter of Berlin, and his resolve to declare his city free of Jews by March. (Diary, February 2, 1943). Its local character is clear, for example in its references to specific work-camps in the region. It does invoke the Reich Security Main Office (RSHA) to lay out the purpose of the action as detaining all Jews "for the purpose of collection". Erfassung might mean either "collection" or "registration", but critically for its interpretation here, in the Erlass it applies to all Jews arrested—including those sent to Auschwitz—and not just to Jews in intermarriage.

== Commemoration ==
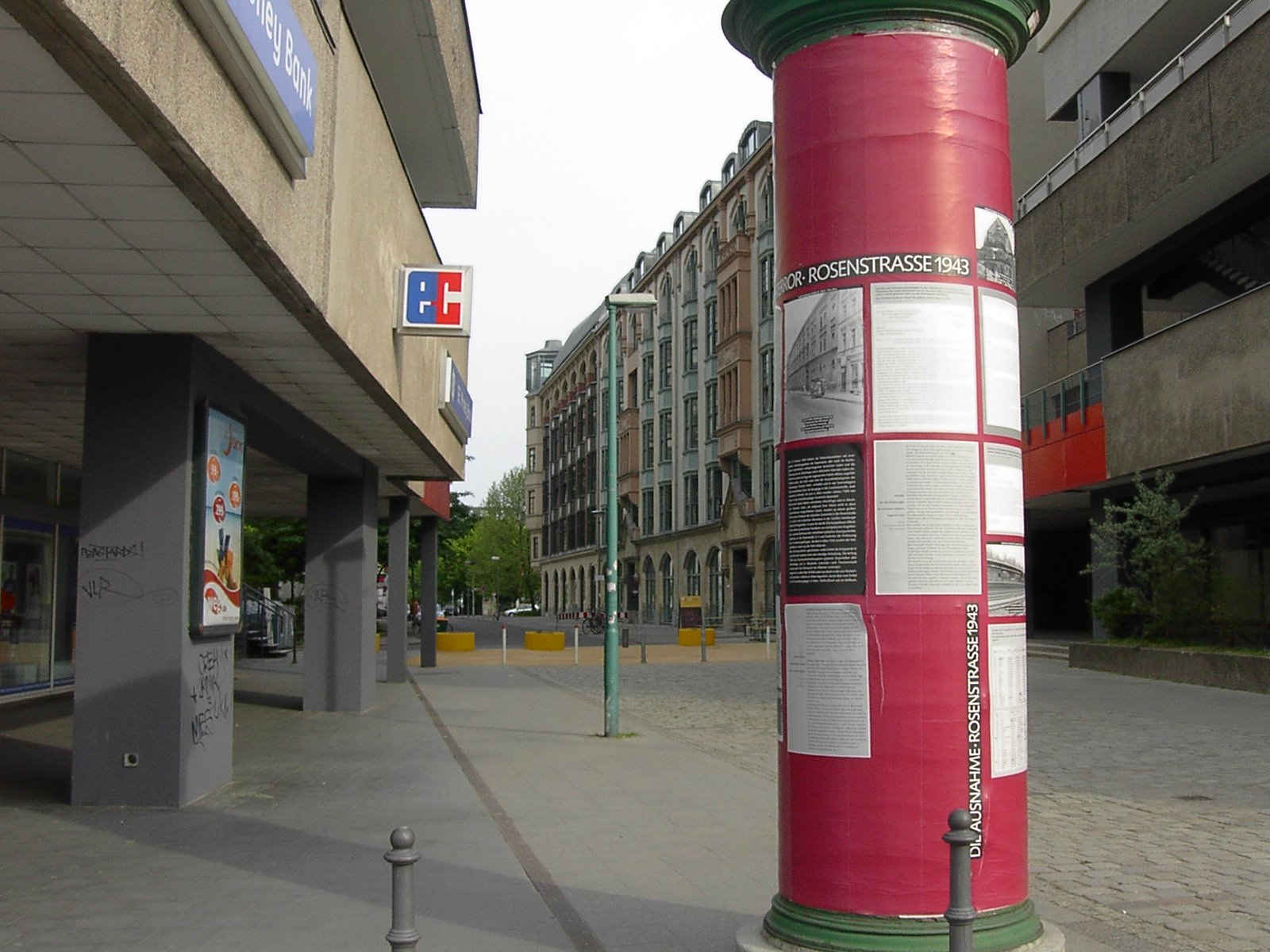
The building in which the detainees were held no longer exists. A rose-colored Litfaß column commemorates the event.

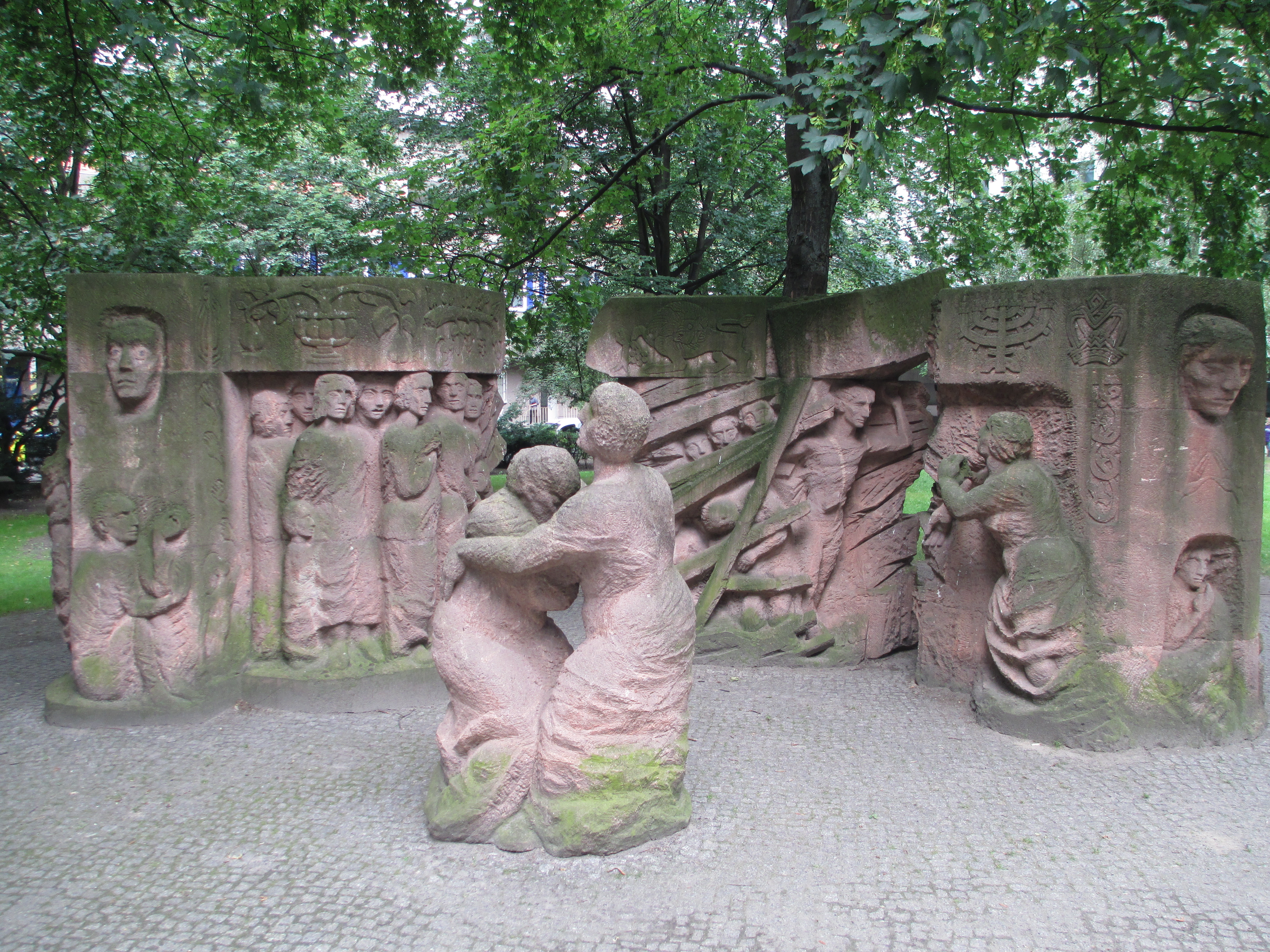
Rosenstrasse protest memorial

The building on Rosenstraße, near Alexanderplatz, in which the men were held, was destroyed during an Allied bombing of Berlin at the end of the war. The original Rosenstraße location is now marked by a rose-colored Litfaß column that is 2–3 meters high, dedicated to the demonstration. Information about this event is posted on the Litfaß column.

In the mid-1980s, Ingeborg Hunzinger, an East German sculptor, created a memorial to those women who took part in the Rosenstraße Protest. The memorial, named "Block der Frauen" (Block of Women), was erected in 1995 in a park not far from the site of the protest. The sculpture shows protesting and mourning women, and an inscription on the back reads: "The strength of civil disobedience, the vigour of love overcomes the violence of dictatorship; Give us our men back; Women were standing here, defeating death; Jewish men were free". The Israeli historian Omer Bartov observed that the memorial does not actually explain what the Rosenstrasse protests were or achieved, as if many Germans would prefer to forget about the protests, presumably because the protesters achieved their demands.

The events of the Rosenstraße protests were made into a film in 2003 by Margarethe von Trotta under the title Rosenstraße.

The 75th anniversary of the protest occurred in 2018. The German consulate in New York, United States commemorated the anniversary on February 24, 2018. German politician Petra Pau, vice president of parliament and member of Germany's socialist party Die Linke, gave a speech in the Bundestag marking the anniversary. An opinion piece in the Jerusalem Post on the 75th anniversary of the Rosenstraße protests compared those events to the grievances expressed during the 2017–2018 Iranian protests.

On 29 August 2024, the memorial was defaced with graffiti "Jews are committing genocide".
