= Ingeborg Hunzinger =

German sculptor

- Born: Ingeborg Franck; 3 February 1915; Berlin, Germany
- Died: 19 July 2009 (aged 94); Berlin, Germany
- Known for: Sculpture
- Spouse(s): Adolf Hunzinger (1949–? (div); Robert Riehl (1960s–1976, his death)
- Partner: Helmut Ruhmer (1939–1945)

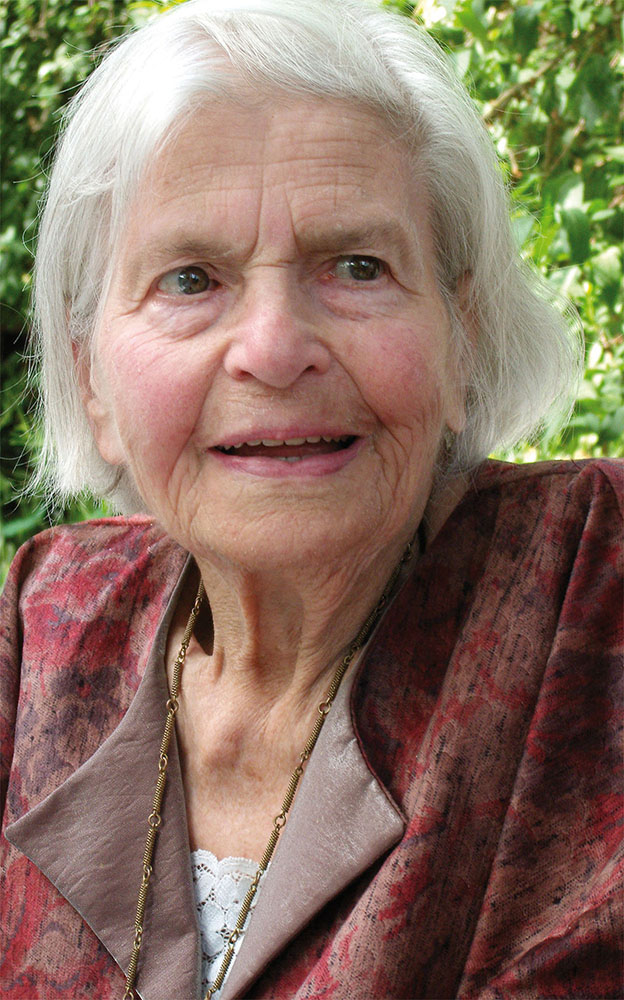
Ingeborg Hunzinger (2008)

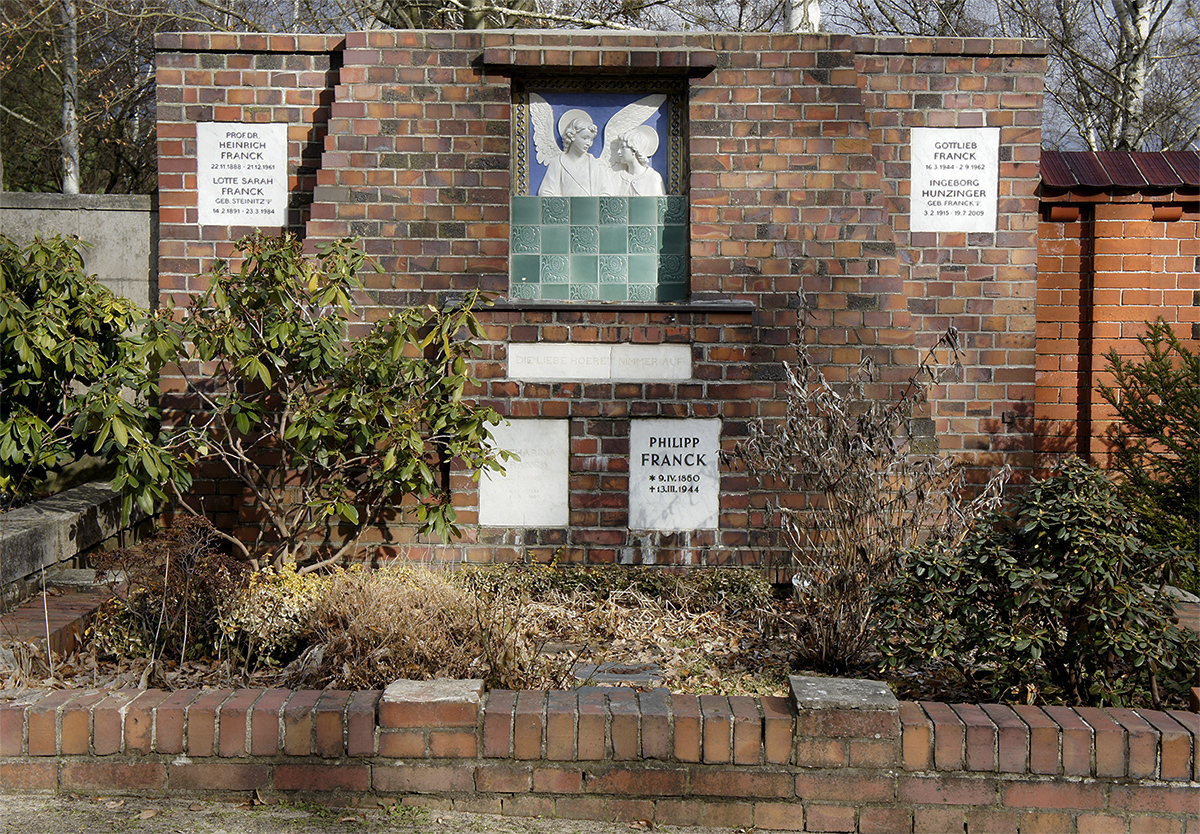
Tomb of the sculptor Ingeborg Hunzinger in the family grave Franck, Alter Friedhof Wannsee, Berlin

Ingeborg Hunzinger (3 February 1915, in Berlin – 19 July 2009, in Berlin) was a German sculptor.

== Life and career ==
Hunzinger was born Ingeborg Franck to a Jewish mother. In 1932 Ingeborg joined the Communist Party. She was an apprentice stone mason in Würzburg from 1936 until 1938. She was then pupil of Ludwig Kasper for the duration of 1938/39. When the Nazis prevented her continued education and teaching in 1939, she emigrated to Italy. There, she met the German painter Helmut Ruhmer. In 1942, they returned to the Black Forest, Germany, and had two children. However, because of Ingeborg's part-Jewish ancestry, they were not allowed to marry within the country.

Ruhmer was killed in the last year of World War II and Ingeborg married Adolf Hunzinger in the mid-fifties, with whom she had her third child. After a divorce from Hunzinger, she married the sculptor Robert Riehl in the mid-sixties.

Hunzinger resumed her art studies in East Berlin in the early fifties; she was a master pupil of Fritz Cremer and Gustav Seitz. She taught at the Academy of Art Berlin-Weißensee and worked from 1953 as a free-lance artist. She joined later the Party of Democratic Socialism.

In 1995, Hunzinger created Block der Frauen (Block of Women) on the site of the Old Synagogue where the Rosenstrasse protests took place. She created this to honour the courage of the women who fought to protect their families.

Hunzinger was the grandmother of the writer Julia Franck.

== Selected works ==
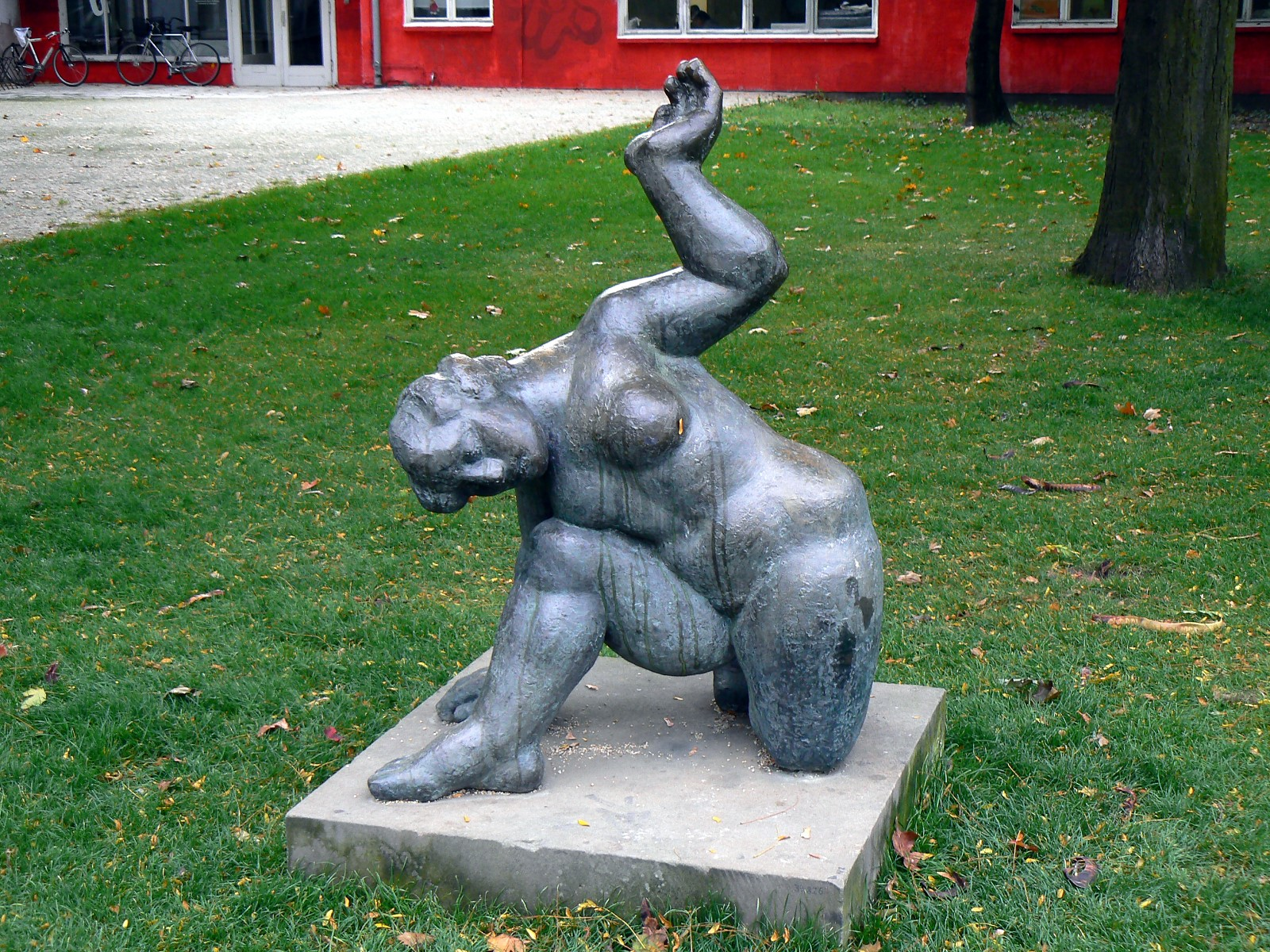
Die Erde, 1974

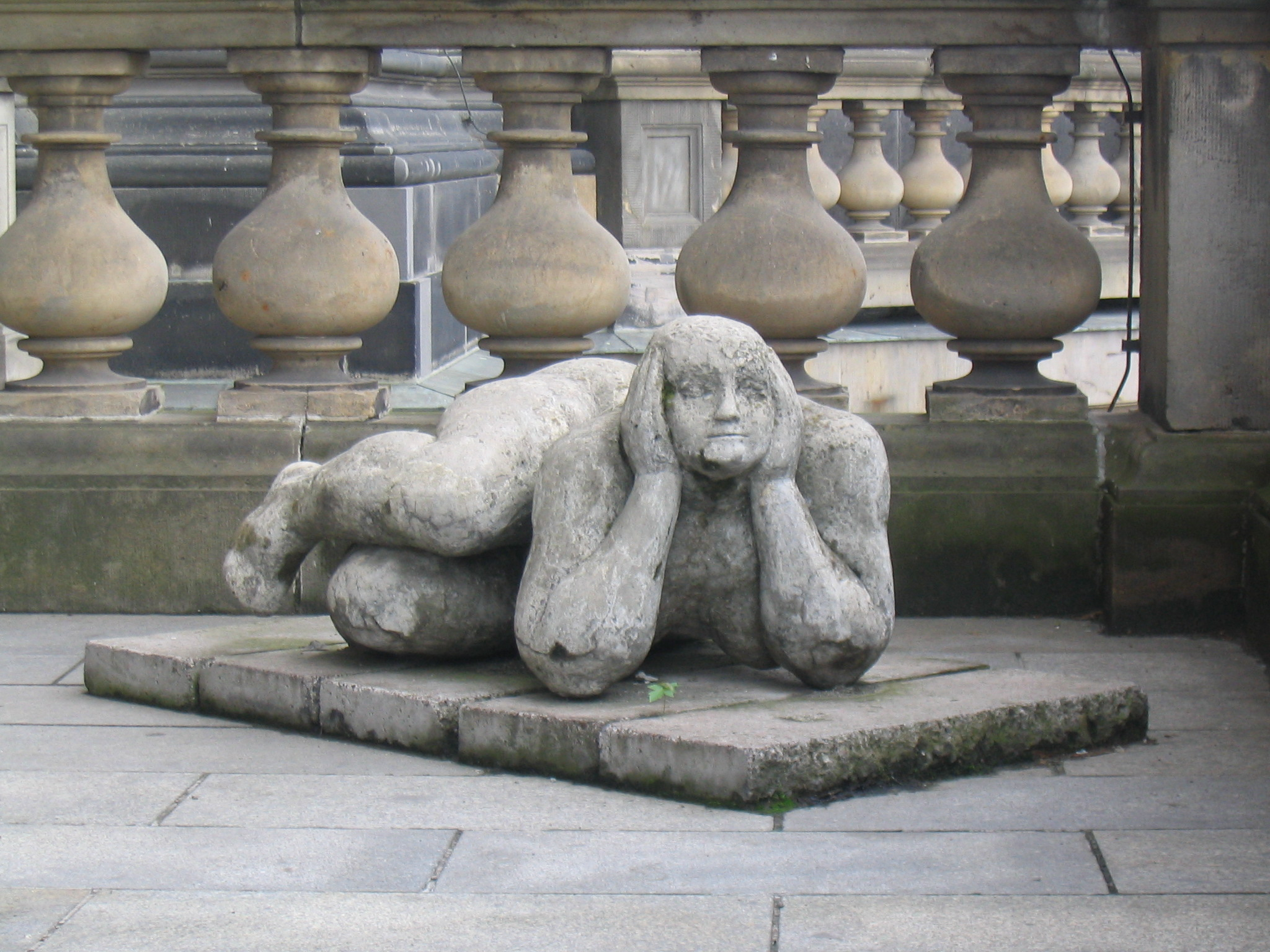
The Sphinx, 1975

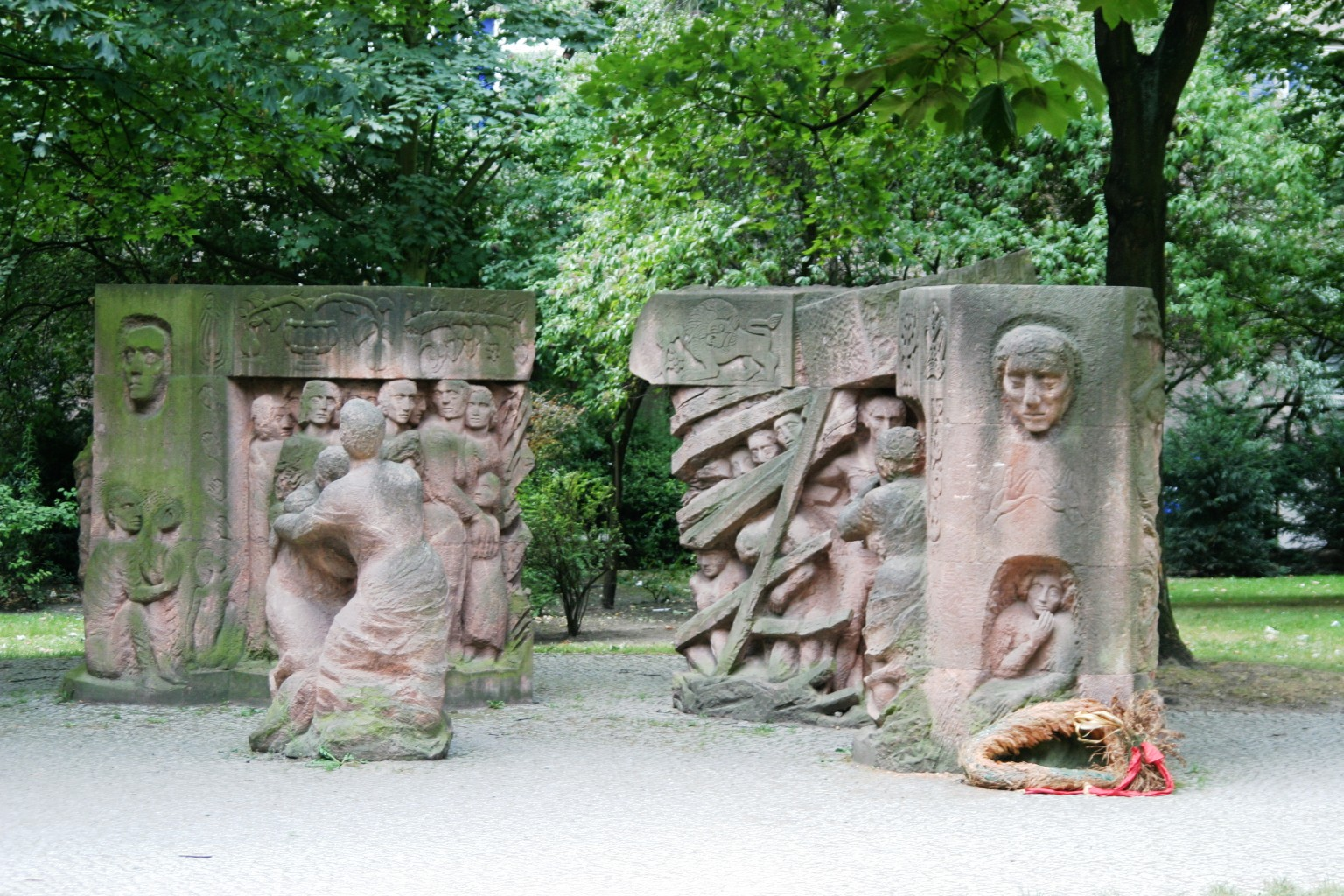
Block der Frauen, 1995

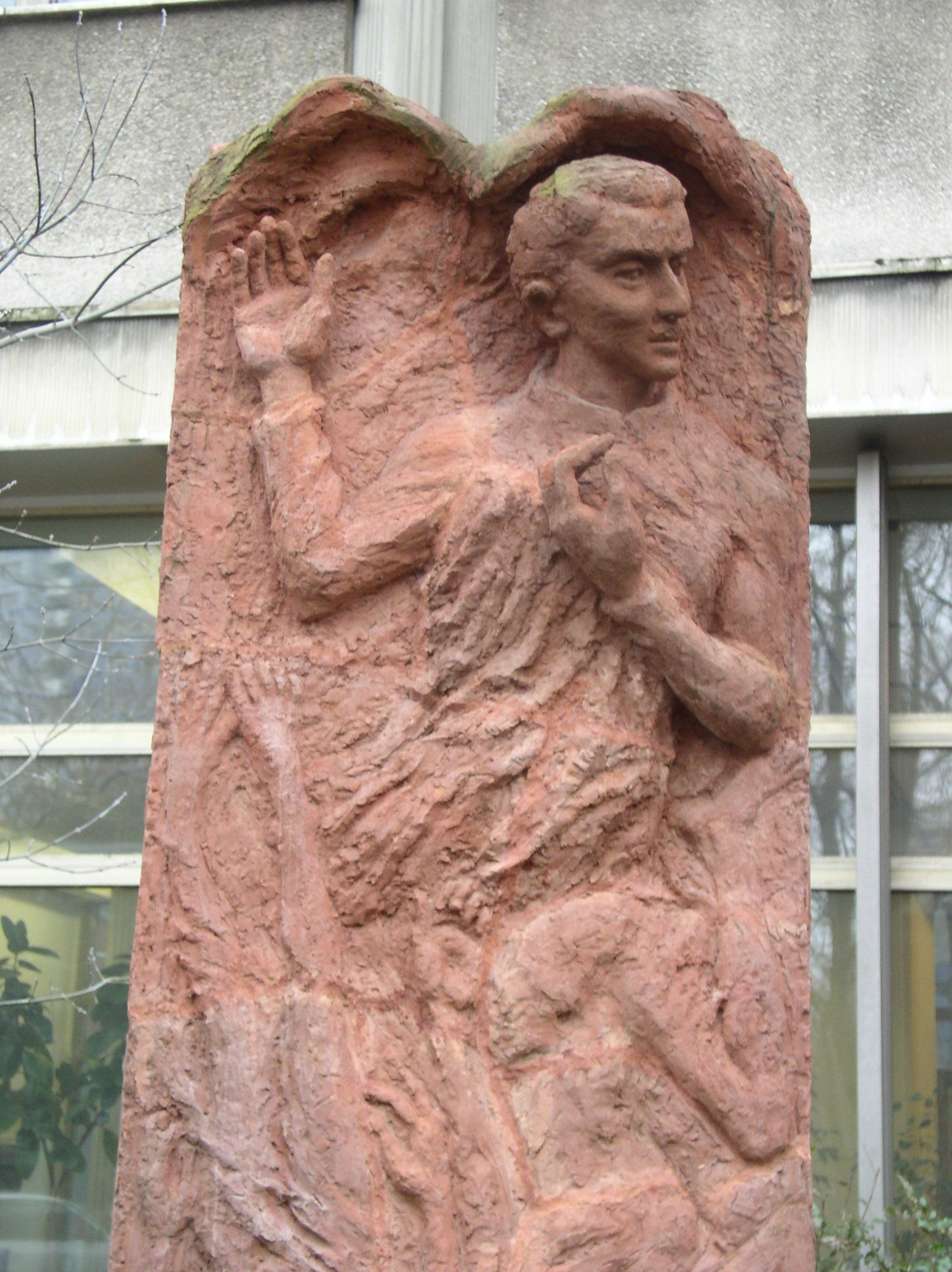
Karl Liebknecht, 1998

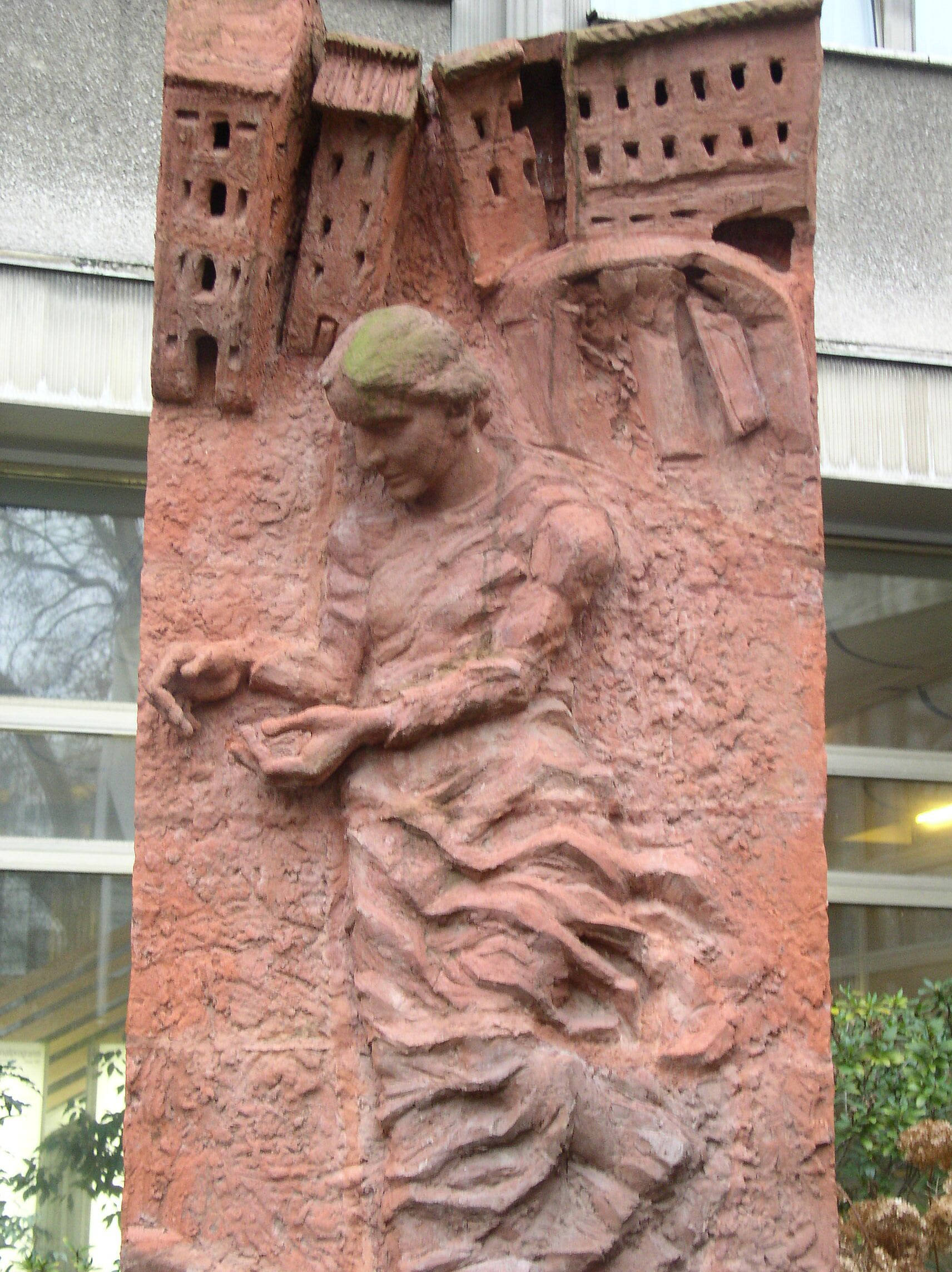
Mathilde Jacob, 1998

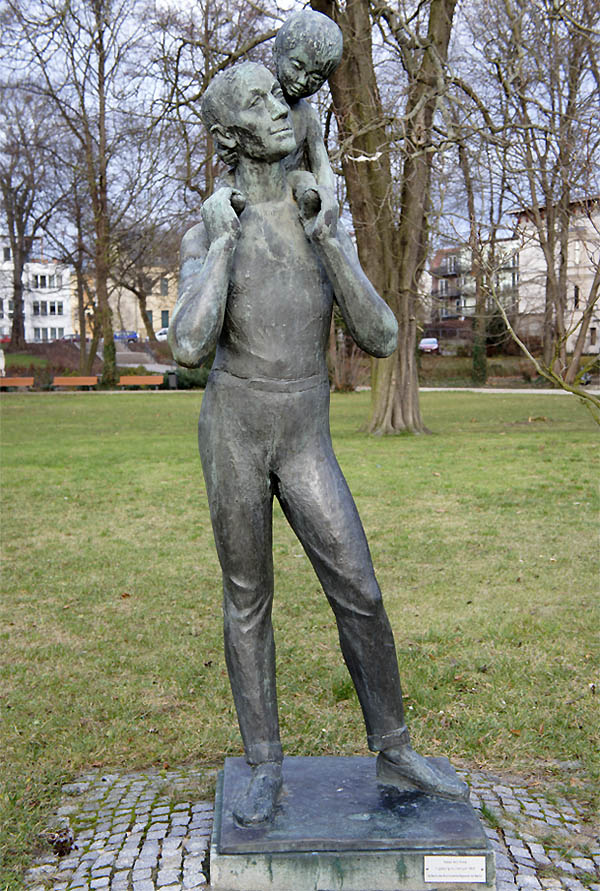
Vater und Kind, 1958, Müggelpark
Berlin-Friedrichshagen

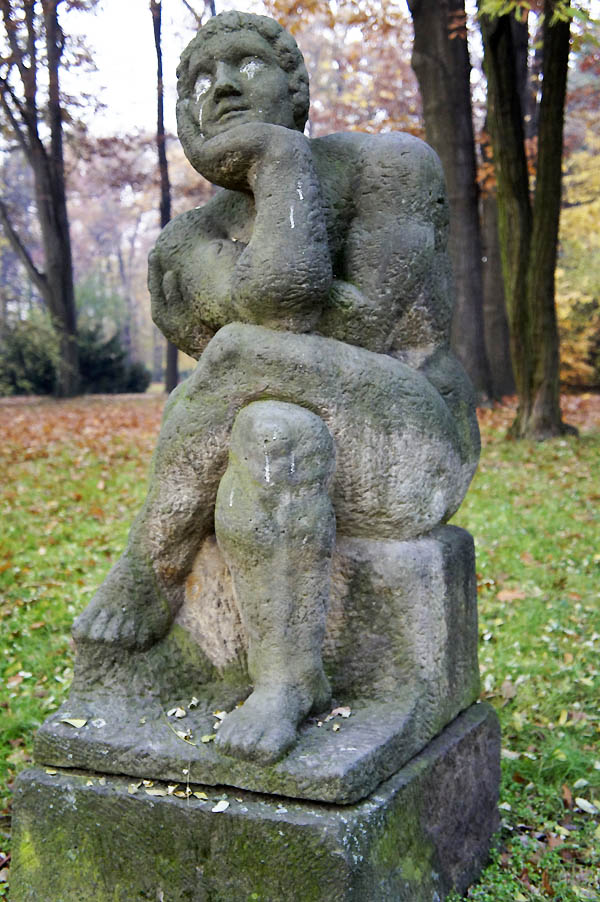
Die Sinnende, 1980, Schlosspark Biesdorf
Berlin-Marzahn

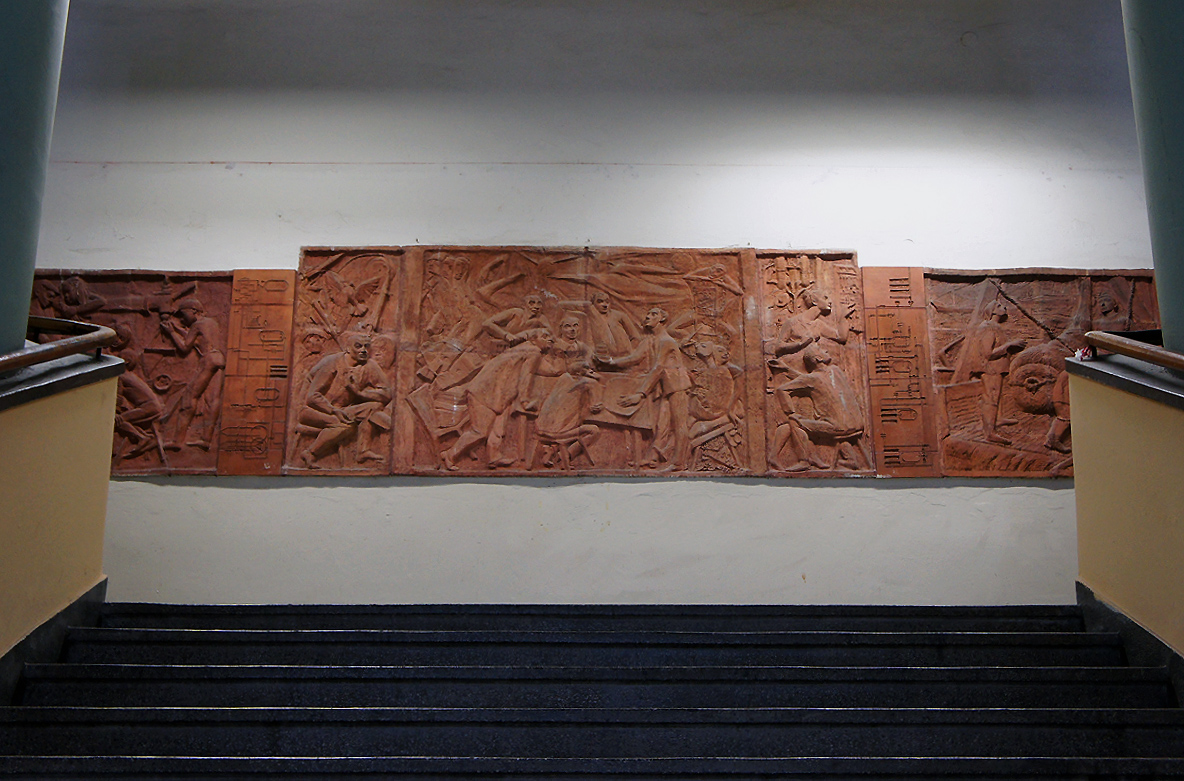
Tugenden und Laster des Sozialismus, 1966, Funkwerk
Berlin-Köpenick

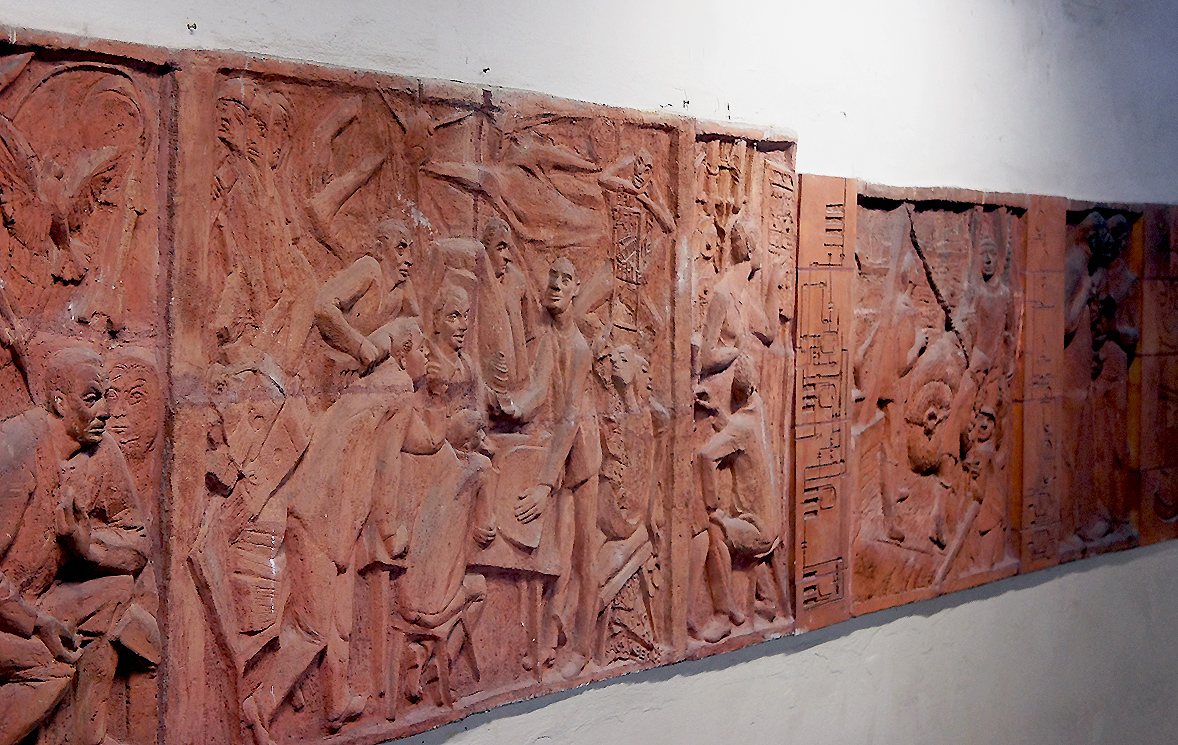
Tugenden und Laster des Sozialismus, 1966, Funkwerk
Berlin-Köpenick

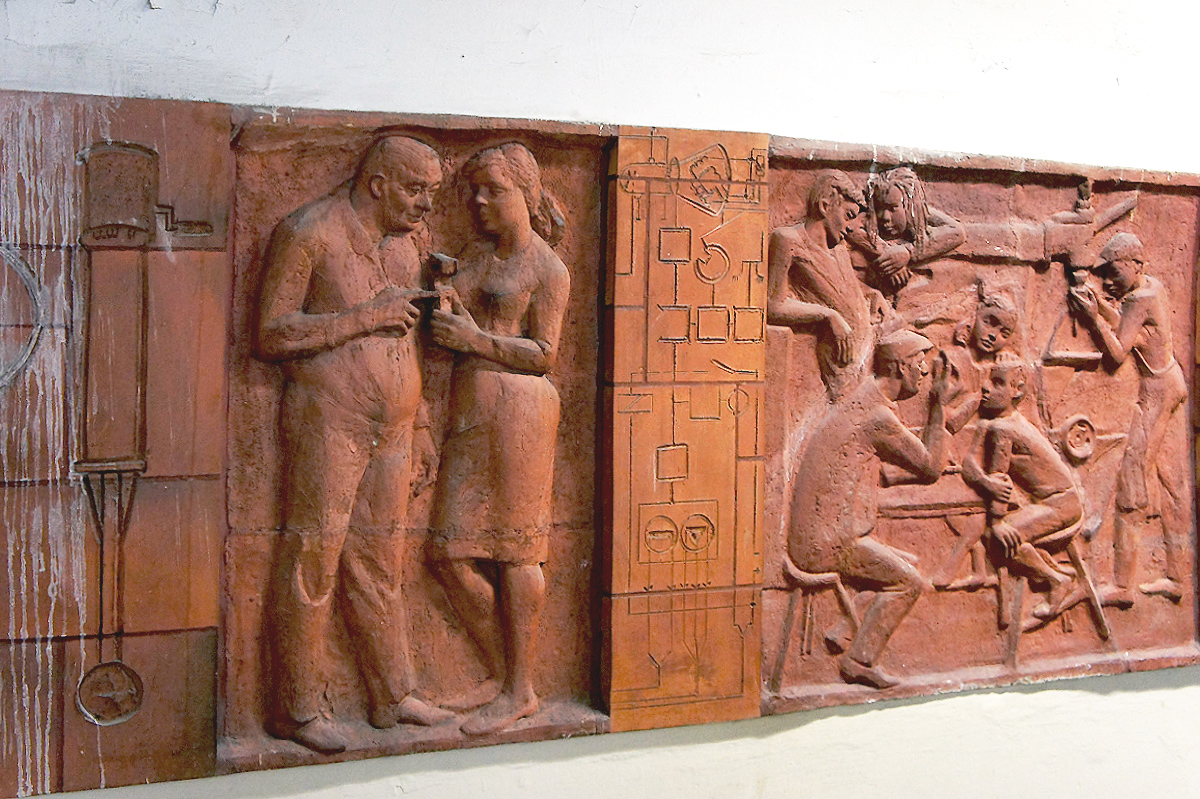
Tugenden und Laster des Sozialismus, 1966, Funkwerk
Berlin-Köpenick

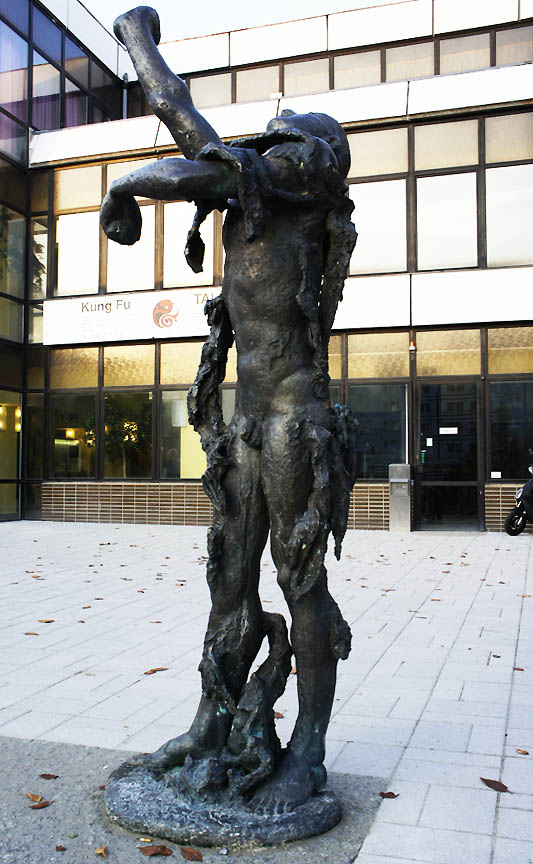
Sich Befreiender, 1991, Marzahner Promenade
Berlin-Marzahn

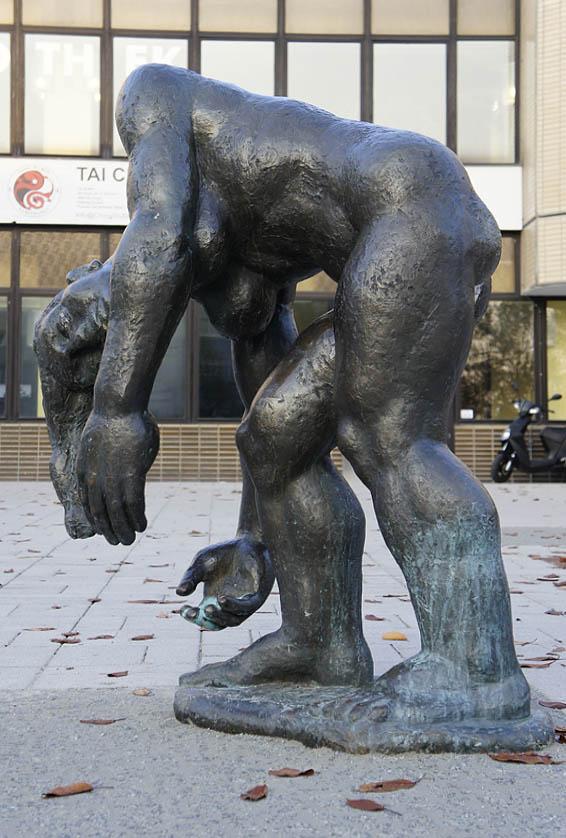
Sich Aufrichtende, 1987, Marzahner Promenade
Berlin-Marzahn

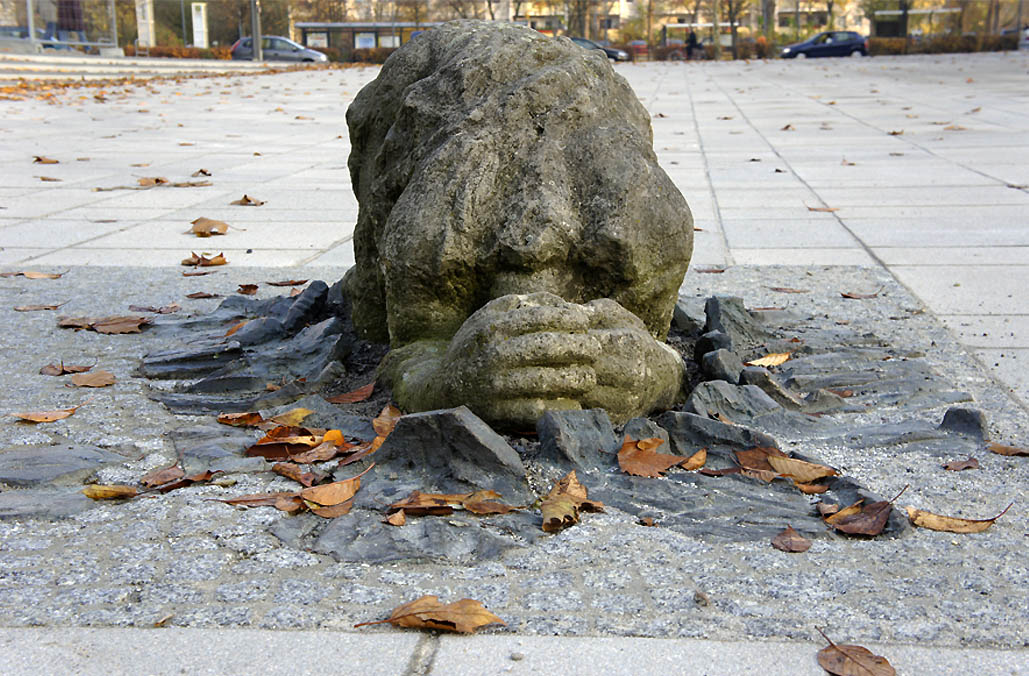
Die Geschlagene, 1985, Marzahner Promenade
Berlin-Marzahn

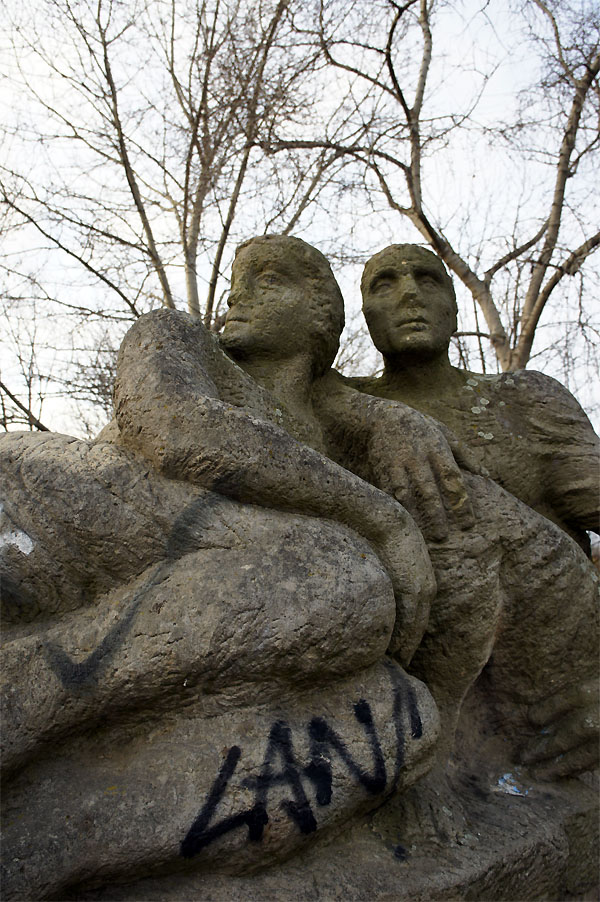
Paar-Alter (Detail), 1987, Schragenfeldstraße
Berlin-Marzahn

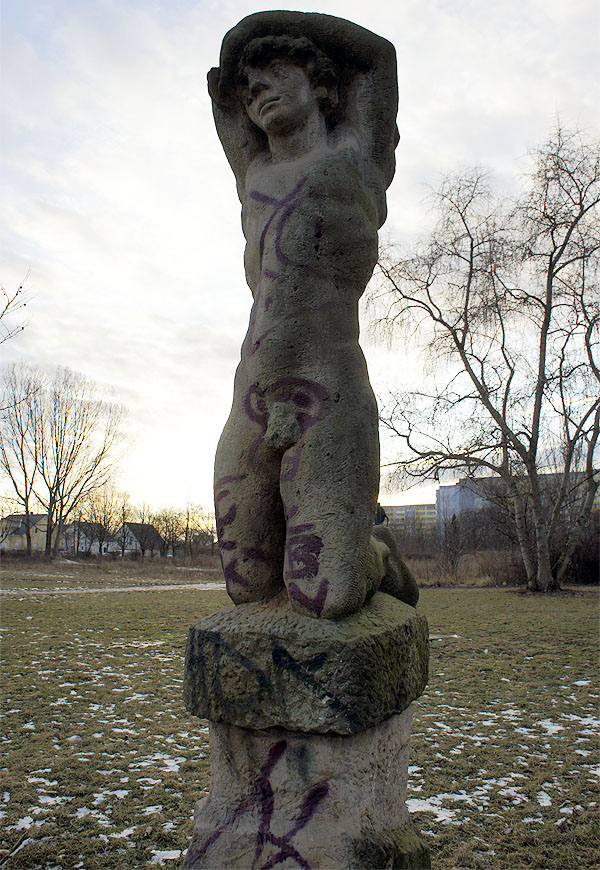
Der Jüngling, 1987, Schragenfeldstraße
Berlin-Marzahn

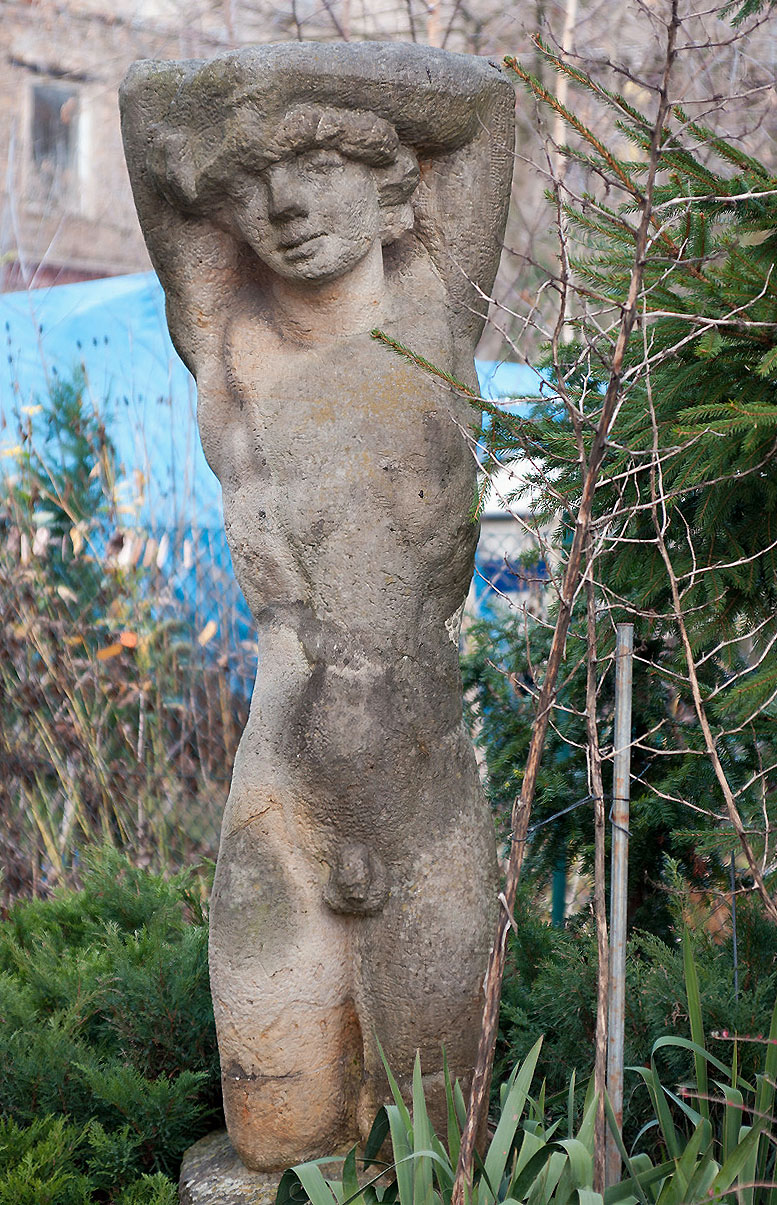
Der Knabe, 1986, Gartencenter Fürstenwalder Allee
Berlin-Rahnsdorf

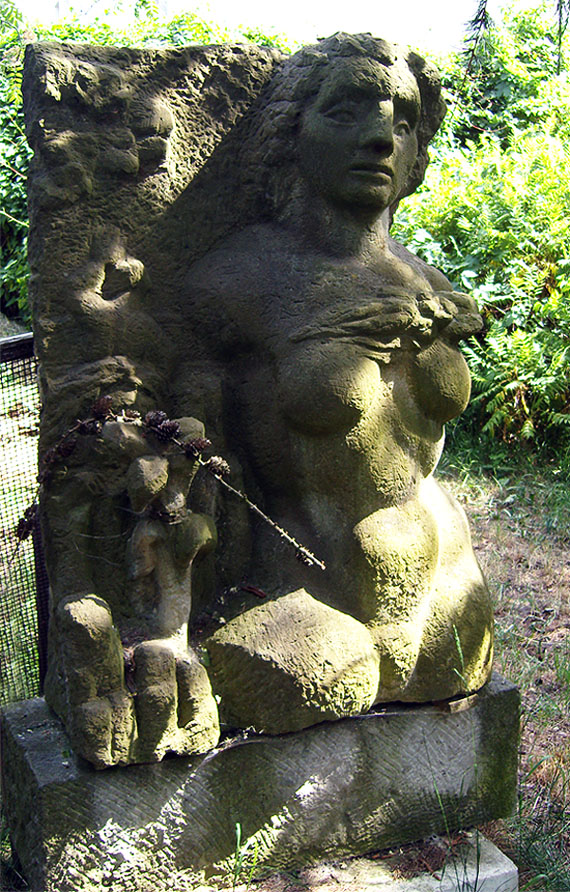
Werden, 1987, Garten der Künstlerin
Berlin-Rahnsdorf

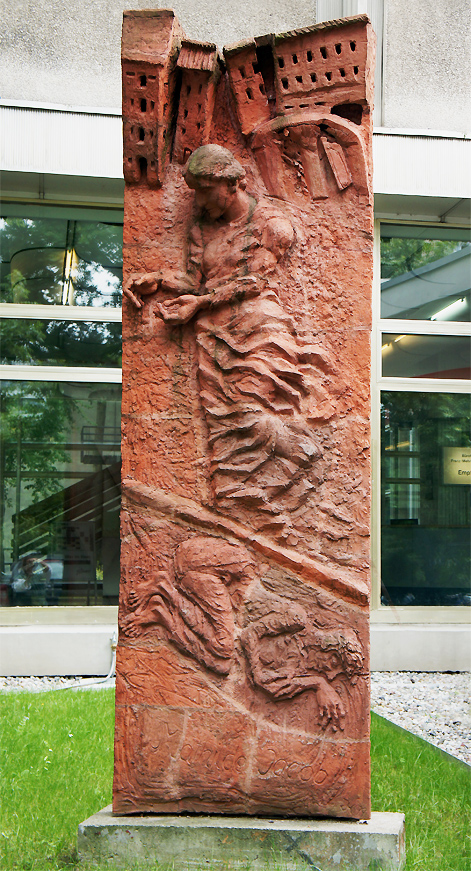
Gedenken an Mathilde Jakob, 1998, Franz-Mehring-Platz
Berlin-Friedrichshain

== Literature ==
- Christel Wollmann-Fiedler: Ingeborg Hunzinger. Die Bildhauerin. Wuppertal: HP Nacke Verlag, 2005. ISBN 3-9808059-6-4
- Rengha Rodewill: Einblicke – Künstlerische - Literarische - Politische. The sculptor Ingeborg Hunzinger. With letters from Rosa Luxemburg. Karin Kramer Verlag, Berlin 2012, ISBN 3-87956-368-3
