= Sozusagen grundlos vergnügt =

Poem by Mascha Kaléko

- Poem, song
- English: "Call it Causelessly Merry"
- Text: by Mascha Kaléko
- Language: German
- Published: 1977

"Sozusagen grundlos vergnügt" ("Call it Causelessly Merry") is a poem by Mascha Kaléko. It begins with the line "Ich freu mich, daß am Himmel Wolken ziehen" (I enjoy that clouds travel in the sky). It was published in 1977, after her death, and was set to music by Herbert Baumann.

== History ==
The author had moved with her family from Galicia to Berlin, where she had contact with writers such as Erich Kästner, Else Lasker-Schüler and Kurt Tucholsky. Hermann Hesse compared her to Heinrich Heine; she had a similar sense of irony, preventing sentimentality. Her poems were published in the newspapers Vossische Zeitung and Berliner Tageblatt.

The poem was published by Deutscher Taschenbuch Verlag in 1977 in the collection In meinen Träumen läutet es Sturm (In my dreams, a storm is brewing). The collection of poems and epigrams was edited by Gisela Zoch-Westphal, to whom Kaléko had entrusted her unpublished writings. "Sozusagen grundlos vergnügt" was among 42 of her poems set to music for voice and guitar by Herbert Baumann and is the title of a CD recorded in 2011 by singer Alix Dudel and Sebastian Albert.

== Content ==
The poem is structured in three stanzas, the first two with eight lines, the last one with ten. It begins with the incipit "Ich freu mich, daß am Himmel Wolken ziehen" (I enjoy that clouds travel in the sky). The first-person speaker lists images for reasons to be happy, some of which are not necessarily reasons to be happy at first sight, such as rain, hail, frost and snow, mentioned in the second line. In the third stanza, the poet turns to herself, saying "In mir ist alles aufgeräumt und heiter" (Everything in me is cleaned-up and cheerful). It ends with the conclusion "Ich freu mich, dass ich mich freu" (I enjoy that I enjoy).
