= Martha Mosse =

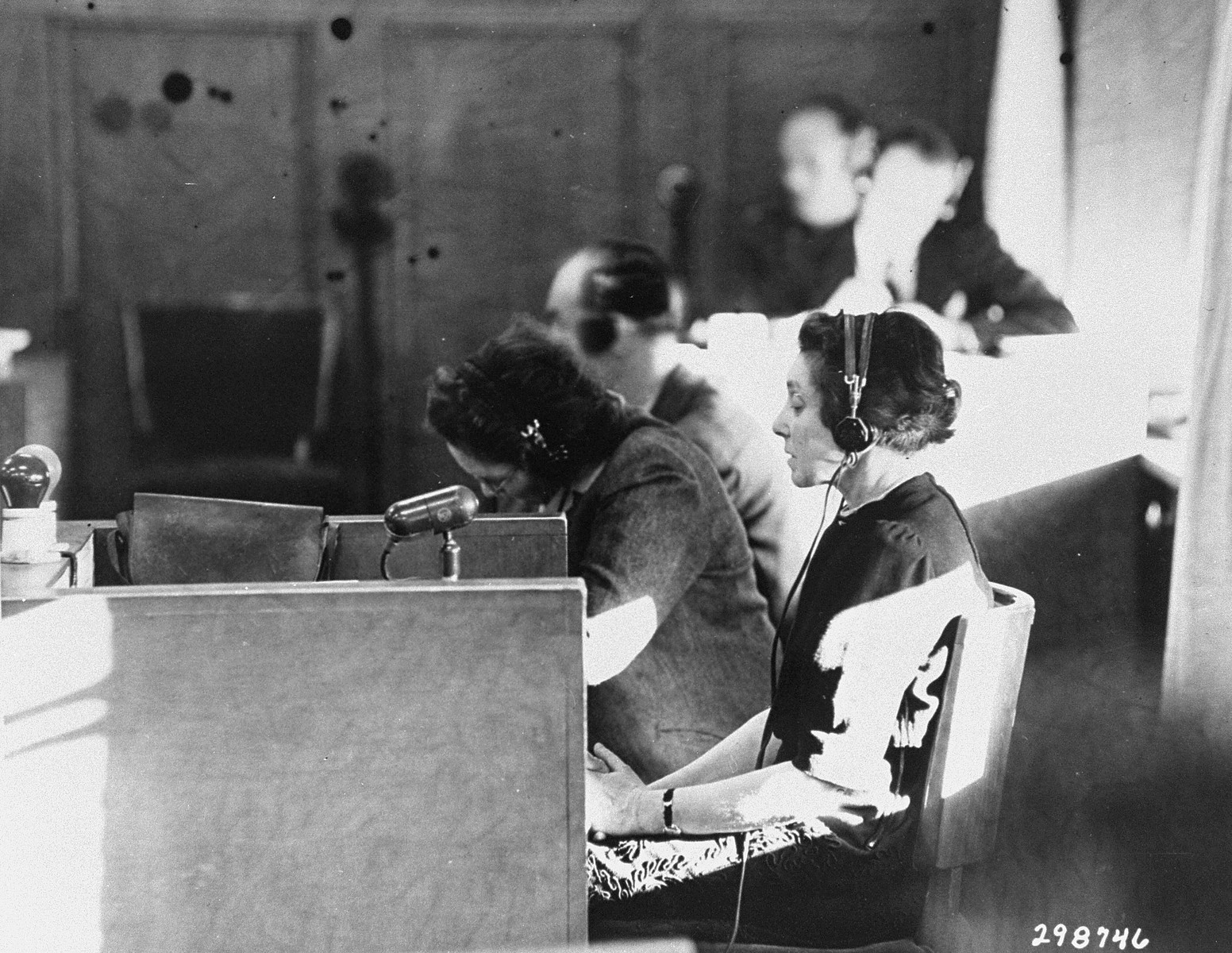
Mosse testifies for the prosecution at the Ministries Trial

Martha Mosse (29 May 1884 in Berlin — 2 September 1977 in Berlin) was a German lawyer who was Prussia's first female teacher at the Berlin Police Headquarters. Because of her Jewish origin, she was given a professional ban during Germany's period under Nazi government and deported in 1943 to the ghetto Theresienstadt, a concentration camp in the Protectorate of Bohemia and Moravia (now Terezín in the Czech Republic). Mosse survived the Holocaust and was a witness in the Nuremberg trials.

She left the "German Center for Youth Welfare" in 1916 and initially attended law lectures in Heidelberg and Berlin as a guest student. However, since she had not taken the Abitur, she was unable to obtain a regular degree. Nevertheless, she was allowed to obtain a doctorate in law in Heidelberg in August 1920 with her dissertation Erziehungsanspruch des Kindes. Subsequently, with special permission, she was able to intern at the Berlin-Schöneberg District Court in the capacity of a legal clerk for six months and was then employed as a legal assistant at the Prussian Ministry of Welfare.

She worked for the Berlin Criminal Police and the Traffic Department at police headquarters from August 1948 until her retirement in 1953. After that, she was still involved with the Berlin Women's Association until the 1970s, and was deputy chairwoman for a time. There she devoted herself in particular to the Women's Movement's Committee on Aid to the Aged. Her "Memoirs," appendix: The Jewish Community of Berlin 1934-1943, was published in July 1958.
