= List of writers by name: R =

The following is a List of writers by name whose last names begin with R:

Abbreviations: ch = children's; d = drama, screenwriting; f = fiction; nf = non-fiction; p = poetry, song lyrics

== Ra ==
- Wilhelm Raabe (1831–1910, Germany, f)
- Rodolfo Rabanal (1940–2020, Argentina, f/nf/ch)
- Rabanus Maurus (c. 780–856, Germany, p/nf)
- Jean-Joseph Rabearivelo (1901 or 1903–1937, Madagascar, p)
- François Rabelais (1494–1553, France, nf/p)
- Gottlieb Rabener (1714–1771, Germany, nf)
- Pierre Rabhi (1938–2021, Algeria/France, nf/f)
- Mubarak Rabi (born 1938, Morocco, f/nf)
- Jan Rabie (1920–2001, S Africa, f/nf/ch)
- Roger de Rabutin, Comte de Bussy (1618–1693, France, nf)
- Ćirjak Račanin (c. 1660–1731, Ottoman E/Hungary, nf)
- Hristifor Račanin (c. 1595–1770, Ottoman E/Hungary, nf)
- Jerotej Račanin (c. 1650–1727, Ottoman E/Hungary, nf)
- Kiprijan Račanin (c. 1650–1730, Ottoman E/Hungary, nf)
- Prohor Račanin (c. 1617–1678, Ottoman E/Hungary, nf)
- Simeon Račanin (fl. 1676–1700, Ottoman E, nf)
- Teodor Račanin (c. 1500–1560, Ottoman E, nf)
- Kočo Racin (1908–1943, Ottoman E/Albania, p/nf)
- Jean Racine (1639–1699, France, d/p)
- Henrikas Radauskas (1910–1970, Poland/US, p)
- Ann Radcliffe (1764–1823, England, f)
- Timothy Radcliffe (born 1945, England, nf)
- Thomas Head Raddall (1903–1994, England/Canada, nf/f)
- Thérèse Radic (born 1935, Australia, nf/d)
- William Radice (born 1951, England, p/nf)
- Branko Radičević (1824–1853, Serbia, p)
- Yordan Radichkov (1929–2004, Bulgaria, f/d)
- Raymond Radiguet (1903–1923, France, f/p)
- Leetile Disang Raditladi (1910–1971, Botswana, d/p)
- Miklós Radnóti (1909–1944, Hungary, p)
- Amfilohije Radović (1938–2020, Yugoslavia/Montenegro, nf)
- Duško Radović (1922–1984, Yugoslavia, ch/p/nf)
- Ion Heliade Rădulescu (1802–1872, Wallachia/Romania, p/nf/f)
- Constantin Rădulescu-Motru (1868–1957, Romania, nf/d)
- Andrija Radulović (born 1970, Yugoslavia/Serbia, p)
- Jovan Radulović (1951–2018, Yugoslavia/Serbia, f/d/nf)
- Walery Eljasz Radzikowski (1841–1905, Poland, nf)
- Gwynedd Rae (1892–1977,
- Hugh C. Rae (1935–2014, Scotland, f), pseudonym Jessica Stirling
- Janet Milne Rae (1844–1933, Scotland, f)
- Charlotte-Arrisoa Rafenomanjato (1936–2008, Madagascar, p/f/d)
- Elizabeth Raffald (1733–1781, England, nf)
- Raffi (1835–1888, Iran/Russian E, f)
- Sam Ragan (1915–1996, US, nf/p)
- Anne B. Ragde (born 1957, Norway, f)
- Baldur Ragnarsson (1930–2018, Iceland, p/nf)
- Jean-Luc Raharimanana (born 1967, Mozambique, f/p/d)
- Tushar Raheja (born 1984, India, f/nf)
- Gely Abdel Rahman (1931–1990, Sudan/Egypt, p)
- Mohammad Lutfur Rahman (1889–1936, India, nf)
- Rizia Rahman (1939–2019, India/Bangladesh, f)
- Shamsur Rahman (1929–2006, India/Bangladesh, p/nf)
- Indra Bahadur Rai (1927–2018, India, f)
- Lala Lajpat Rai (1865–1928, India, nf)
- Stevan Raičković (1928–2007, Yugoslavia/Serbia, p/nf)
- Zahir Raihan (1935–1972, India/Bangladesh, f/d)
- Ferdinand Raimund (1790–1836, Austria, d)
- Allen Raine (1836–1908, Wales, f), pseudonym of Anne Adalisa Beynon Puddicombe
- Craig Raine (born 1944, England, p)
- Kathleen Raine (1908–2003, England, p/nf)
- Hason Raja (1854–1922, India, p)
- Samina Raja (1961–2012, Pakistan, p/nf)
- Hossein Rajabian (born 1984, Iran, d)
- Elie Rajaonarison (1951–2010, Mozambique, p/d)
- Rajashree (living, India, f/d)
- Monisha Rajesh (born 1982, England/India, nf)
- Remi Raji (born 1961, Nigeria, p)
- Jovan Rajić (1726–1801, Serbia, nf/p)
- Velimir Rajić (1879–1915, Serbia, p)
- Đorđe Rajković (1825–1886, Austrian E/Serbia, p/nf)
- Milan Rakić (1876–1938, Serbia/Yugoslavia, p)
- Mita Rakić (1846–1890, Serbia, nf)
- Vićentije Rakić (1750–1818, Serbia, nf/p)
- Slobodan Rakitić (1940–2013, Yugoslavia/Serbia, p)
- Carl Rakosi (1903–2004, Germany/US, p)
- Michèle Rakotoson (born 1948, Mozambique, f/d)
- Martin Rakovský (c. 1535–1579, Hungary, p/nf)
- Zsuzsa Rakovszky (born 1950, Hungary, p)
- Maraea Rakuraku (living, N Zealand, p/f)
- Walter Raleigh (c. 1552–1618, England, p/nf)
- Radoy Ralin (1922–2004, Bulgaria, p/nf)
- Janette Rallison (born 1966, f/ch)
- Tenali Rama (1480–1528, Vijayanagara E, p/nf)
- Ayyalaraju Ramabhadrudu (16thc. CE, Vijayanagara E, p)
- Somaya Ramadan (born 1951, Egypt, f/nf)
- Ramarajabhushanudu (mid-16th c. CE, Vijayanagara E, p)
- Eugène Rambert (1830–1886, Switzerland, nf/p)
- Nabila Ramdani (living, France, nf)
- Povel Ramel (1922–2007, Sweden, p)
- Sergio Ramírez (born 1942, Nicaragua, f/nf)
- Magali García Ramis (born 1946, Puerto Rico, f/nf)
- Karl Wilhelm Ramler (1725–1798, Germany, p)
- Eva Ramm (1925–2026, Norway, nf/f/ch)
- Graciliano Ramos (1892–1953, Brazil, f/ch/nf)
- María Cristina Ramos (born 1952, Argentina, ch)
- Wanda Ramos (1948–1998, Angola/Portugal, f/p)
- Arnold Rampersad (born 1941, Trinidad and Tobago/US, nf)
- Allan Ramsay (1686–1758, Scotland, p/d)
- Andrew Michael Ramsay (1686–1743, Scotland/France, nf)
- John Ramsay of Ochtertyre (1736–1814, Scotland, nf)
- Frank Ramsey (1903–1930, England, nf)
- Katherine Ramsland (born 1953, US, nf)
- Charles Ferdinand Ramuz (1878–1947, Switzerland, p/d)
- Flavien Ranaivo (1914–1999, Madagascar, p/nf)
- John Ranby (1703–1773, England, nf)
- John Ranby (1743–1822, England, nf)
- Ayn Rand (1905–1982, Russia/US, f/nf)
- Charlotte Randall (living, N Zealand, f)
- Derek Randall (born 1951, England, nf)
- Dudley Randall (1914–2000, US, p)
- Beverley Randell (born 1931, N Zealand, ch)
- Jo Randerson (born 1973, N Zealand, f)
- Thomas Randolph (1605–1635, England, p/d)
- Björn Ranelid (born 1949, Sweden, f/nf)
- Anita Rani (born 1977, England, nf)
- Ian Rankin (born 1960, Scotland, f)
- Jennifer Rankin (1941–1979, Australia, p/d)
- Edogawa Ranpo (江戸川乱歩, 1894–1965, Japan, f/nf), pseudonym of Tarō Hirai (平井太郎)
- Christoph Ransmayr (born 1954, Austria, nf/f)
- John Crowe Ransom (1888–1974, US, nf/p)
- Arthur Ransome (1884–1967, England, ch/nf)
- James Allen Ransome (1806–1875, England, nf)
- Rao Xueman (born 1972, China, f/ch)
- A. N. Prahlada Rao (born 1953, India, nf)
- Addepalli Ramamohana Rao (1936–2016, India, p/nf)
- Raja Rao (1908–2006, India, f/nf)
- Ágnes Rapai (born 1952, Hungary, p/nf)
- Frederic Raphael (born 1931, US/England, d/f/nf)
- Nicolas Rapin (1535–1608, France, p/nf)
- Arius Raposas (born 1996, Philippines, f/nf/p)
- Eva Ras (born 1941, Yugoslavia/Serbia, p)
- Noon Meem Rashid (1910–1975, India/England, p)
- Hamid Rashidi (1961–2020, Iran, nf)
- Old Rashko (c. 1770–1822, Ottoman E)
- Ellen Raskin (1928–1984, US, ch)
- Egil Rasmussen (1903–1964, Norway, f/nf)
- Rudolf Erich Raspe (1736–1794, Germany/England, f/nf)
- Stephen Ratcliffe (born 1948, US, p/nf)
- Wilhelm Rath (1897–1973, Germany/Austria, nf)
- Julian Rathbone (1935–2008, England, f)
- Lutz Rathenow (born 1952, Germany, nf/p)
- Wolfgang Ratke (1571–1635, Germany, nf)
- Terence Rattigan (1911–1977, England/Bermuda, d)
- Patricia Ratto (born 1962, Argentina, f)
- Lizzie Frost Rattray (1855–1931, N Zealand, nf)
- John Raven (1914–1980, England, nf)
- Angèle Rawiri (1954–2010, Gabon, f)
- Marjorie Kinnan Rawlings (1896–1953, US, f/ch)
- Gloria Rawlinson (1918–1995, N Zealand, pf)
- Anne Warfield Rawls (born 1950, US, nf)
- John Rawls (1921–2002, US, nf)
- Wilson Rawls (1913–1984, US, ch)
- Tom Raworth (1938–2017, England, p/nf)
- Eduardo Belgrano Rawson (born 1943, Argentina, f)
- Dahlia Ravikovitch (1936–2005, Palestine/Israel, p)
- Francis Ray (1944–2013, US, f)
- Satyajit Ray (1921–1992, India, d/nf)
- Sukumar Ray (1887–1923, India, ch)
- Chet Raymo (born 1936, US, f/nf)
- Derek Raymond (1931–1994, England, f), pseudonym of Robert William Arthur Cook
- Claire Rayner (1931–2010, England, f/nf)
- Yusuf Abu Rayya (1955–2009, Egypt, f/ch)
- Esther Razanadrasoa (1892–1931, Madagascar, f/d/p)
- Ibn Razqa (died 1731, Mauritania, p/nf)
- Martin Rázus (1888–1937, Hungary/Czechoslovakia, p/d/nf)

== Rc–Rh ==
- Guram Rcheulishvili (1934–1960, USSR, f)
- Herbert Read (1893–1968, England, nf/p)
- Mark "Chopper" Read (1954–2013, Australia, f/ch)
- Miss Read (1913–2012, England, f/ch)
- Piers Paul Read (born 1941, England, f/nf)
- Charles Reade (1814–1884, England, f/d)
- Peter Reading (1946–2011, England, p)
- Angela Readman (born 1973, England, p/nf)
- Grisélidis Réal (1929–2005, Switzerland, nf/p)
- Tom Reamy (1935–1977, US, f)
- James Reaney (1926–2008, Canada, p/d/f)
- Kate Reardon (born 1968, US/England, nf)
- Charlotte Reather (living, England, nf)
- Anica Savić Rebac (1892–1953, Serbia/Yugoslavia, nf)
- Liviu Rebreanu (1885–1944, Austria-Hungary/Romania, f/d)
- Alojz Rebula (1924–2018, Italy/Slovenia, d/nf)
- Malliya Rechana (fl. 940 CE, Telangana, nf)
- James Redpath (1833–1891, England/US, nf)
- Peter Redgrove (1932–2003, England, p/f/d)
- Alves Redol (1911–1969, Portugal, f/d/ch)
- Beatrice Redpath (1886–1937, Canada, p/f)
- Henry Reed (1914–1986, p/d/nf)
- Ishmael Reed (born 1938, US, p/f/nf)
- John Reed (born 1969, US, f)
- Talbot Baines Reed (1852–1893, England, ch)
- William Maxwell Reed (1871–1962, US, ch)
- Kerry Reed-Gilbert (1956–2019, Australia, p/nf)
- Douglas Reeman (1924–2017, England, f)
- Märta Helena Reenstierna (1753–1841, Sweden, nf)
- Rosemary Rees (c. 1875–1963, N Zealand, d/f)
- Annie Lee Rees (1864–1949, N Zealand, nf)
- Celia Rees (born 1949, England, f/ch)
- Coralie Clarke Rees (1908–1972, Australia, p/nf/ch)
- David Rees (1936–1993, England, f/ch)
- Ennis Rees (1925–2009, US, p)
- Evan Rees (1850–1923, Wales)
- Gwyneth Rees (born 1968, England/Scotland, ch)
- Ioan Bowen Rees (1929–1999, Wales, p/nf)
- Libby Rees (born 1995, England, nf/ch)
- Sarah Jane Rees (1839–1916, Wales, p/nf), Bardic name Cranogwen
- T. Ifor Rees (1890–1977, Wales, nf)
- Thomas Rees (1815–1885, Wales, nf)
- William Rees (Gwilym Hiraethog) (1802–1883, Wales, p/nf/f)
- Deryn Rees-Jones (born 1968, England, p/nf)
- Clara Reeve (1729–1807, England, f/nf)
- Philip Reeve (born 1966, England, ch)
- Simon Reeve (born 1972, England, nf)
- James Reeves (1909–1978, England, p/d/ch)
- William Pember Reeves (1857–1932, N Zealand, p/nf)
- Steinunn Refsdóttir (fl. late 10th c., Iceland, p)
- Abraham Regelson (1896–1981, Russian E/Israel, p/ch)
- Sven Regener (born 1961, Germany, f/d)
- José Régio (1901–1969, Portugal, f/d/p), pseudonym of José Maria dos Reis Pereira
- Henri de Régnier (1864–1936, France, p)
- José Lins do Rego (1901–1957, Brazil, f)
- Ruth Rehmann (1922–2016, Germany, f/d)
- Marcel Reich-Ranicki (1920–2013, Poland/Germany, nf)
- Christopher Reid (born 1949, Hong Kong/England, p/nf)
- David Boswell Reid (1805–1863, Scotland/US, nf)
- Elizabeth Julia Reid (1915–1971, Australia, nf)
- Meta Mayne Reid (1905–1991, Ireland/England, ch/f/p)
- Rachel Reid (living, Canada, f)
- Thomas Mayne Reid (1818–1883, Ireland/US, f)
- Victor Stafford Reid (1913–1987, Jamaica, f/d/ch)
- Sue Reidy (living, N Zealand, f)
- Matthew Reilly (born 1974, Australia, f)
- Hermann Samuel Reimarus (1694–1768, Germany, nf)
- Uwe Reimer (1948–2004, Germany, nf)
- Jonas Rein (1760–1821, Norway, p)
- Mercedes Rein (1930–2006, Uruguay, nf/d)
- Silvina Reinaudi (born 1942, Argentina, ch)
- Carl Christian Reindorf (1834–1917, Gold Coast, nf)
- Herbert Reinecker (1914–2007, Germany, f/d/nf)
- Reinmar von Hagenau (fl. late 12th c., Germany, p)
- Reinmar von Zweter (c. 1200 – post-1248, Germany, p)
- Haru M. Reischauer (ハル・松方・ライシャワー, 1915–1998, Japan/US, nf)
- Kathryn Reiss (born 1957, US, ch)
- James Reiss (1941–2016, US, p/f)
- Gunnar Reiss-Andersen (1896–1964, Norway, p/nf)
- Julio Herrera y Reissig (1875–1910, Uruguay, p/d/nf)
- Mikołaj Rej (1505–1569, Poland, nf/p)
- Alfonso Reyes (1889–1959, Mexico, nf/f/p)
- Jenő Rejtő (1905–1943, Hungary/Soviet Union, f/nf/d)
- Ludwig Rellstab (1799–1860, Germany, p/nf)
- Erich Maria Remarque (1898–1970, Germany/Switzerland, f)
- Miha Remec (1928–2020, Yugoslavia/Slovenia, f)
- Joscha Remus (born 1958, Germany, nf)
- Ren Rongrong (任溶溶, 1923–2022, China, ch)
- Jules Renard (1864–1910, France, f/d/nf)
- Mary Renault (1905–1983, England/S Africa, f/nf)
- Tore Renberg (born 1972, Norway, f/ch/d)
- Robert Rendall (1898–1967, Scotland, p/nf)
- Ruth Rendell (1930–2015, England, f)
- Víctor Manuel Rendón (1859–1940, Ecuador, p/f/p)
- Lothar Rendulic (1887–1971, Austria, nf)
- Mikihiko Renjō (連城三紀彦, 1948–2013, Japan, f)
- Sophie de Renneville (1772–1822, France, ch/nf), pseudonym of Sophie de Senneterre
- Þorleifur Repp (1794–1857, Iceland/Denmark, nf)
- André de Resende (1498–1573, Portugal, nf)
- Garcia de Resende (1470–1536, Portugal, p)
- Milan Rešetar (1860–1942, Austrian E/Italy, nf)
- Mike Resnick (1942–2020, US, f)
- Laura Restrepo (born 1950, Colombia, f/nf)
- Nicolas-Edme Rétif (1734–1806, France, f)
- Johann Reuchlin (1455–1522, Germany, nf)
- Neidhart von Reuental (c. 1190 – post–1236 or 1237, Germany/Austria, p)
- Fritz Reuter (1810–1874, Germany, f)
- Gerard Reve (1923–2006, Netherlands, f)
- Karel van het Reve (1921–1999, Netherlands, nf)
- Pierre Reverdy (1889–1960, France, p)
- Alma Reville (1899–1982, England/US, d)
- Jacobus Revius (1586–1658, Netherlands, p/nf)
- José Revueltas (1914–1976, Mexico, nf)
- Guy Rewenig (born 1947, Luxembourg, f)
- Adam Rex (born 1973, US, ch)
- H. A. Rey (1898–1977, Germany/US, ch), born Hans Augusto Reyersbach
- Sydor Rey (1908–1979, Poland, p/f)
- Edgardo M. Reyes (1936–2012, Philippines, f/d)
- Władysław Reymont (1867–1925, Russian E/Poland, f)
- Helene Reynard (1875–1947, Austrian E/England, nf)
- Alastair Reynolds (born 1966, Wales/England, f)
- George W. M. Reynolds (1814–1879, England, f/p)
- John Hamilton Reynolds (1794–1852, England, p/nf/d)
- Mack Reynolds (1917–1983, US, f)
- Kenneth Rexroth (1905–1982, US, p/nf)
- Charles Reznikoff (1894–1976, US, p)
- Ludwig Rhesa (1776–1840, E Prussia, nf)
- Fouzia Rhissassi (born 1950, Morocco, nf)
- Dan Rhodes (born 1972, England, f)
- Lou Rhodes (born 1978, England, p)
- Pam Rhodes (born 1950, England, nf)
- William Barnes Rhodes (1772–1826, England, d)
- Najima Rhozali (born 1960, Morocco, nf)
- Edward Prosser Rhys (1901–1945, Wales, p)
- Jean Rhys (1890–1979, Dominica/England, f)
- Morgan Rhys (1716–1779, Wales, p)
- Siôn Dafydd Rhys (1534 – c. 1609, Wales, nf)

== Ri ==
- Kamel Riahi (born 1974, Tunisia/Algeria, f/nf)
- Begum Akhtar Riazuddin (1928–2023, India/Pakistan, nf)
- Francisco Granizo Ribadeneira (1925–2009, Ecuador, p)
- Óscar Ribas (1909–2004, Angola, f/nf)
- Aquilino Ribeiro (1885–1963, Portugal, f)
- Bernardim Ribeiro (1482–1552, Portugal, p/f)
- João Ubaldo Ribeiro (1941–2014, Brazil, f/ch/d)
- Orlando Ribeiro (1911–1997, Portugal, nf)
- Julio Ramón Ribeyro (1929–1994, Peru, f/nf/d)
- Josip Ribičič (1886–1969, Austrian E/Yugoslavia, ch)
- Cassiano Ricardo (1895–1974, Brazil, nf/p)
- Michelangelo Ricci (1619–1682, Italy, nf)
- Marie Jeanne Riccoboni (1713–1792, France, f)
- Anne Rice (1941–2021, US, f/nf)
- Stan Rice (1942–2002, US, p)
- Suzy Rice (living, US, d/f)
- Adrienne Rich (1929–2012, US, p/nf)
- Mary Rich, Countess of Warwick (1625–1678, England, nf)
- David Richards (Dafydd Ionawr) (1751–1827, Wales, p)
- David Adams Richards (born 1950, Canada, f/p/nf)
- Emilie Richards (living, US, f)
- Justin Richards (born 1961, England, f)
- Laura E. Richards (1850–1943, US, nf/p/ch)
- Thomas Richards (1878–1962, Wales, nf)
- Dorothy Richardson (1873–1957, England, f/nf)
- Henry Handel Richardson (1870–1946, Australia, f), pseudonym of Ethel Florence Lindesay Richardson
- John Richardson (1817–1886, England, p/nf)
- Paddy Richardson (living, N Zealand, f)
- Robert Richardson (1850–1901, Australia, ch/p)
- Samuel Richardson (1689–1761, England, f/nf)
- Mordecai Richler (1931–2001, Canada, f/nf/ch)
- E. J. Richmond (1825–1918, US, f)
- Legh Richmond (1772–1827, England, nf/ch)
- Mary Richmond (1853–1949, N Zealand, nf)
- Hans Peter Richter (1925–1993, Germany, f/ch)
- Hans Werner Richter (1908–1993, Germany, f/nf)
- Thomas 'Clio' Rickman (1760–1834, England, nf)
- Edgell Rickword (1898–1982, England, p/nf)
- Charlotte Riddell (1832–1906, Ireland/England, f)
- Chris Riddell (born 1962, S Africa/England, ch)
- Elizabeth Riddell (1910–1998, Australia, p/nf)
- James Riddell (1823–1866, England, nf)
- Lola Ridge (1873–1941, Ireland/US, p/nf)
- William Pett Ridge (1859–1930, England, f)
- Christie Ridgway (living, US, f)
- Laura Riding (1901–1991, US, p/nf/f)
- Anne Ridler (1912–2001, England, p
- Betty Ridley (1909–2005, England, nf)
- James Ridley (1736–1765, England, f)
- Brigitte Riebe (born 1953, Germany, f)
- E. V. Rieu (1887–1972, England, nf/p/ch)
- Alifa Rifaat (1930–1996, Egypt, f)
- Karl Riha (1935–2026, Germany, p/f/nf)
- Rainer Maria Rilke (1875–1926, Austrian E/Switzerland, p/f)
- Anna Rankin Riggs (1835–1908, US, nf)
- Ransom Riggs (born 1979, US, f)
- James Riley (born 1977, US, f)
- James Whitcomb Riley (1849–1916, US, p/ch)
- Joan Riley (born 1958, Jamaica/England, f)
- John Riley (1937–1978, England, p)
- Lawrence Riley (1896–1974, US, d)
- Willie Riley (1866–1961, England, f)
- Rainer Maria Rilke (1875–1926, Austria-Hungary/Switzerland, p/f)
- Gopal Prasad Rimal (1917–1973, Nepal, p)
- Arthur Rimbaud (1854–1891, France p/nf)
- Penny Rimbaud (born 1943, England, nf)
- Øyvind Rimbereid (born 1966, Norway, p/f/nf)
- Joachim Ringelnatz (1883–1934, Germany, p), pseudonym of Hans Bötticher
- Luise Rinser (1911–2002, Germany, f)
- João do Rio (1881–1921, Brazil, f/d)
- Miguel Riofrío (1822–1879, Ecuador, f)
- Rick Riordan (born 1964, US, f)
- Alberto Ríos (born 1952, US, p/nf/f)
- Dorothy Ripley (1767–1931, England/US, nf)
- Francis Ripley (1912–1998, England, nf)
- Gina Rippon (born 1950, England, nf)
- Johann Rist (1607–1667, Germany, p/d)
- Jovan Ristić (1831–1899, Serbia, nf)
- Marko Ristić (1902–1984, Serbia/Yugoslavia, p/nf)
- Karl Ristikivi (1912–1977, Estonia/Sweden, f/nf)
- Blaže Ristovski (1931–2018, Yugoslavia/N Macedonia, nf)
- Anne Isabella Thackeray Ritchie (1837–1919, England, f/nf)
- Frances Ritchie (born 1942, England, nf)
- James Ewing Ritchie (1820–1898, England, nf)
- William Ritter (1867–1955, Switzerland, f/nf)
- Alice Rivaz (1901–1998, Switzerland, f/p/nf)
- Richard Rive (1931–1989, S Africa, f/nf)
- Alejandro Tapia y Rivera (1826–1882, Puerto Rico, p/d/nf)
- Andrés Rivera (1928–2016, Argentina, f)
- Jorge B. Rivera (1935–2004, Argentina, p/nf)
- José Eustasio Rivera (1888–1928, Colombia, f)
- Jamie Rix (born 1958, England, ch/d)
- Joan Riviere (1883–1962, England, nf)
- José Rizal (1861–1896, Philippines, f/p/nf)
- Khawar Rizvi (1938–1981, India/Pakistan, p/nf), pseudonym of Syed Sibte Hassan Rizvi
- Steve Rizzo (living, US, nf)

== Ro ==
- Grigol Robakidze (1880–1962, Russian E/Switzerland, f/nf)
- Karen Robards (born 1954, US, f)
- Candace Robb (born 1950, US, f)
- Alain Robbe-Grillet (1922–2008, France, f/nf)
- Tom Robbins (1932—2025, US, f)
- Antoinette Henriette Clémence Robert (1797–1872, France, f/p/d)
- Gruffydd Robert (1572–1598, Wales/Italy, nf)
- Shaaban bin Robert (1909–1962, Tanzania, nf/p)
- Robert Roberthin (1600–1648, Germany, p), pseudonym Berrintho
- Adam Roberts (born 1940, England, nf)
- Adam Roberts (born 1965, Scotland/England, f/p/nf)
- Alice Roberts (born 1973, England, nf)
- Brynley F. Roberts (1931–2023, Wales, nf)
- Cecil Roberts (1892–1976, England, p/d/f)
- Eigra Lewis Roberts (1939–2026, Wales, d/f/ch)
- Eleazar Roberts (1825–1912, Wales/England, nf)
- Emma Roberts (1794–1840, England, nf/p)
- Emrys Roberts (1929–2012, Wales, p), bardic name Emrys Deudraeth
- Jason Roberts (living, US, f/nf)
- Kate Roberts (1891–1985, Wales, f)
- Keith Roberts (1935–2000, England, f/nf)
- Les Roberts (born 1937, US, d/f)
- Michael Roberts (1902–1948, England, p/nf), born William Edward Roberts
- Nora Roberts (born 1950, US, f)
- Paul Craig Roberts (born 1939, US, nf)
- Samuel Roberts (1800–1885, Wales, nf)
- William Owen Roberts (born 1960, Wales, f/d)
- E. Arnot Robertson (1903–1961, England, f/nf)
- T. W. Robertson (1829–1871, England, d)
- Gilles de Roberval (1602–1675, France, nf)
- Andrea di Robilant (born 1957, Italy, nf)
- Denise Robins (1897–1985, England, f/nf)
- Gertrude Minnie Robins (1861–1939, England, f)
- Patricia Robins (1921–2016, England, f), pseudonym Claire Lorrimer
- Bill Robinson (1918–2007, US, nf)
- Bruce Robinson (born 1946, England, d/f)
- Edwin Arlington Robinson (1869–1935, US, p)
- Emma Robinson (1814–1890, England, f/d)
- Frederick William Robinson (1830–1901, England, f/nf)
- Henry Crabb Robinson (1775–1867, England, nf)
- Hilary Robinson (born 1962, England/Isle of Man, ch)
- Jancis Robinson (born 1950, England, nf)
- Hilary Robinson (born 1952, England, ch/nf)
- Joan G. Robinson (1910–1988, England, ch)
- John Robinson (1919–1983, England, nf)
- Keith Robertson (1914–1991, US, ch/f)
- Kim Stanley Robinson (born 1952, US, f)
- Lynda Suzanne Robinson (born 1951, US, f)
- Mary Robinson (1757–1800, England, p/d/f)
- Peter Robinson (born 1950, England/Canada, f)
- Peter Robinson (born 1953, England, p)
- Ray Robinson (born 1971, England, f/d)
- Roland Robinson (1912–1992, Ireland/Australia, p)
- Spider Robinson (born 1948, US/Canada, f)
- W. Andrew Robinson (born 1957, England, nf)
- Emmanuel Roblès (1914–1995, Algeria/France, f/nf)
- Gary D. Robson (born 1958, US, ch)
- Lucia St. Clair Robson (born 1942, US, f)
- Benedita Barata da Rocha (1949–2021, Portugal/France, nf)
- Luiz Duarte da Rocha (born 1956, Brazil, f/d/ch)
- Radoslav Rochallyi (born 1980, Czechoslovakia, p/f/nf)
- Charlotte Roche (born 1978, England/Germany, f)
- Lauren Kim Roche (born 1961, N Zealand, nf)
- Regina Maria Roche (1764–1845, England, f)
- Sophie von La Roche (1730–1807, Germany, f)
- Violet Augusta Roche (1885–1967, N Zealand, nf)
- Ross Rocklynne (1913–1988, US, f)
- Alexander Roda Roda (1872–1945, Austrian E/US, f/nf)
- Gianni Rodari (1920–1980, Italy, ch)
- Gene Roddenberry (1921–1991, US, d)
- Georges Rodenbach (1855–1898, Belgium/France, p/f)
- Tsoncho Rodev (1926–2011, Bulgaria, f/nf)
- W. R. Rodgers (1909–1969, Ireland/N Ireland, p/nf)
- Maxime Rodinson (1915–2004, France, nf)
- José Enrique Rodó (1871–1917, Uruguay, nf)
- Mercè Rodoreda (1908–1983, Spain, f/d)
- Nelson Rodrigues (1912–1980, Brazil, d/nf/f)
- Urbano Tavares Rodrigues (1923–2013, Portugal, nf/f)
- Judith Rodriguez (1936–2018, Australia, p)
- Manuel Díaz Rodríguez (1871–1927, Venezuela/US, nf)
- Sheila Rodwell (1947–2009,
- Maria Rodziewiczówna (1863–1944, Russian E/Poland, f/nf)
- Jill Roe (1940–2017, Australia, nf)
- Mark Roeder (born 1957, England/Australia, nf)
- Theodore Roethke (1908–1963, US, p)
- Don Roff (born 1966, US, f/d)
- Monique Roffey (born 1965, Trinidad/England, f/nf)
- Noëlle Roger (1874–1953, Switzerland, nf/f/ch), pseudonym of Hélène Pittard
- Bruce Holland Rogers (born 1958, US, f)
- Effie Hoffman Rogers (1853/55–1918, US, nf)
- Rosemary Rogers (1932–2019, Ceylon/US, f)
- Samuel Rogers (1763–1855, England, p/nf)
- Thomas Rogers (died 1616, England, nf)
- Rögnvald Kali Kolsson (c. 1100–1158, Norway, p), known as St Ronald of Orkney
- Eiríkur Rögnvaldsson (born 1955, Iceland, nf)
- Anker Rogstad (1925–1994, Norway, f)
- David Rohl (born 1950, England, nf)
- Sax Rohmer (1883–1959, England, f), pseudonym of Arthur Henry "Sarsfield" Ward
- Richard Rohr (born 1943, US, nf)
- Matthew Rohrer (born 1970, US, p)
- Géza Röhrig (born 1967, Hungary, p)
- Arturo Andrés Roig (1922–2012, Argentina, nf)
- Ángel Felicísimo Rojas (1909–2003, Ecuador, f/nf)
- Gonzalo Rojas (1916–2011, Chile, p)
- Manuel Rojas (1896–1973, Chile, p/f/nf)
- Ricardo Rojas (1882–1957, Argentina, nf)
- Begum Rokeya (1880–1932, India, nf/f)
- Betty Roland (1903–1996, Australia, d/f/ch)
- Frederick Rolfe (1860–1913, England/Italy, f/nf), pseudonym Baron Corvo
- Nordahl Rolfsen (1848–1928, Norway, p/d/ch)
- Romain Rolland (1866–1944, France, d/f/nf)
- Hilda Rollett (1873–1970, N Zealand, nf)
- Alice Rollins-Crane (1856–1929, US, nf)
- Adelaide Day Rollston (1854–1941, US, p/f)
- Jules Romains (1885–1972, France, p/d/f)
- Isabella Frances Romer (1898–1952, England, f/nf)
- George A. Romero (1940–2017, US/Canada, d)
- David Romtvedt (living, US, p)
- Santiago Roncagliolo (born 1975, Peru, f/nf)
- Pierre de Ronsard (1524–1585, France, p)
- Nathalie Ronvaux (born 1977, Luxembourg, p/d)
- Elena de Roo (living, N Zealand, ch/p)
- Dan Roodt (born 1957, S Africa, f/nf)
- Daphne Rooke (1914–2009, S Africa, f/nf/ch)
- Ginny Rorby (born 1944, US, f/ch)
- Amanda McKittrick Ros (1860–1939, Ireland/N Ireland, f/p)
- João Guimarães Rosa (1908–1967, Brazil, f)
- Ninotchka Rosca (born 1950, Philippines, f/nf)
- Heather Rose (born 1964, Australia, f/ch)
- Kenneth Rose (1924–2014, England, nf)
- Malcolm Rose (born 1953, England, ch)
- Peter Rose (born 1955, Australia, p/nf/f)
- Simon Rose (born 1961, Canada, ch)
- Peter Rosegger (1843–1918, Austria, p/nf)
- Peter Rosei (born 1946, Austria, f/nf/ch)
- Henrietta Rose-Innes (born 1971, S Africa, f)
- Raymond Roseliep (1917–1983, US, p)
- Franklin Rosemont (1943–2009, US, p/nf)
- Penelope Rosemont (born 1942, US, nf/f)
- Michael Rosen (born 1946, England, ch)
- Isaac Rosenberg (1890–1918, England/France, p)
- Joel Rosenberg (1954–2011, Canada/US, f)
- Nancy Taylor Rosenberg (1946–2017, US, f)
- Sasha Roseneil (born 1966, England, nf)
- Gabriel Rosenstock (1949–2026, Ireland, p/nf/f)
- Amy Krouse Rosenthal (1965–2017, US, nf/ch)
- Eric Rosenthal (1905–1983, S Africa, nf)
- Mordecai Roshwald (1921–2015, Poland/US, f/nf)
- Barbara Rosiek (1959–2020, Poland, nf/p)
- Joan Rosier-Jones (born 1940, N Zealand, f/d/nf)
- Alice Grant Rosman (1882–1961, Australia, f)
- Ann Rosman (born 1973, Sweden, f)
- Meg Rosoff (born 1956, US/England, f/ch)
- Alan Ross (1922–2001, India/England, nf/p/ch)
- Alexander Ross (c. 1590–1654, Scotland/England, nf)
- Alexander Ross (1699–1784, Scotland, p)
- Diana Ross (1910–2000, Malta/England, ch)
- Leone Ross (born 1969, England, f/nf/p)
- Tomas Ross (born 1944, Netherlands, f), pseudonym of Willem Pieter Hogendoorn
- Rossana Rossanda (1924–2020, Italy, nf)
- Maria Rosseels (1916–2005, Belgium, f/nf)
- Maarten van Rossem (born 1943, Netherlands, nf)
- Christina Rossetti (1830–1894, England, p/f/ch)
- Dante Gabriel Rossetti (1828–1882, England, p)
- Johann Leonhard Rost (1688–1727, Germany, nf), pseudonym Meletaon
- Edmond Rostand (1868–1918, France, p/d)
- Renee Roszel (living, US, f)
- Eugen Roth (1895–1976, Germany, p)
- Friederike Roth (born 1948, Germany, d)
- Gerhard Roth (1942–2022, Austria, f)
- Joseph Roth (1894–1939, Austrian E/France, f/nf)
- Miriam Roth (1910–2005, Hungary/Israel, ch)
- Patrick Roth (born 1953, Germany, f/nf)
- Philip Roth (1933–2018, US, f)
- Stephan Ludwig Roth (1796–1849, Austrian E/Hungary, nf)
- Veronica Roth (born 1988, US, f)
- Yechezkel Roth (1936–2021, US, nf)
- Patrick Rothfuss (born 1973, US, f)
- Tony Rothman (born 1953, US, nf)
- Maria Elizabeth Rothmann (1875–1975, S Africa, nf), pseudonym M.E.R.
- Toni Rothmund (1877–1956, Germany, f/nf)
- Ola Rotimi (1938–2000, Nigeria, d)
- Gustave Roud (1897–1976, Switzerland, p)
- Denis de Rougemont (1906–1986, Switzerland, nf)
- Andrus Rõuk (born 1957, USSR/Estonia, f)
- Jacques Roumain (1907–1944, Haiti, f/nf)
- Jean-Jacques Rousseau (1712–1778, France, nf)
- Raymond Roussel (1877–1933, France, p/f/d)
- André Roussin (1911–1987, France, d)
- Pavla Rovan (1908–1999, Austrian E/Slovenia, p/f)
- David Rowbotham (1924–2010, Australia, p/nf)
- Jennifer Rowe (born 1948, Australia, f/ch)
- Nicholas Rowe (1674–1718, England, p/d)
- Noel Rowe (1951–2007, Australia, p)
- Rainbow Rowell (born 1973, US, f/ch)
- Dafydd Rowlands (1931–2001, Wales, nf/d)
- Graham Rowlands (born 1947, Australia, p)
- Jane Helen Rowlands (1891–1955, Wales/India, nf)
- John Rowlands (1938–2015, Wales, f/nf)
- Samuel Rowlands (c. 1573–1630, England, nf/p)
- William Rowlands (1802–1865, Wales, nf)
- Christopher Rowley (born 1948, US, f)
- J. K. Rowling (born 1965, England/Scotland, ch/f)
- Martin Rowson (born 1959, England, f)
- Tania Roxborogh (born 1965, N Zealand, nf)
- Susanna Roxman (1946–2015, Sweden, p/nf)
- Ron Roy (born 1940, US, ch)
- Arundhati Roy (born 1961, India, f/nf)
- Gabrielle Roy (1909–1983, Canada, f/nf)
- Hemendra Kumar Roy (1888–1963, India, ch)
- Ram Mohan Roy (1772–1833, India/England, nf)
- Ron Roy (born 1940, US, ch)
- Maude Royden (1876–1956, England, nf)
- Kristína Royová (1860–1936, Hungary/Czechoslovakia, f/nf/p)
- S. J. Rozan (born 1950, US, f/p/nf)
- Marjan Rožanc (1930–1990, Yugoslavia, nf)
- Istvan Rozanich (1912–1984, Hungary/Venezuela, p)
- Tadeusz Różewicz (1921–2014, Poland, p/d)
- Endre Rózsa (1941–1995, Hungary, p)

== Rs–Rz ==
- Ljubivoje Ršumović (born 1939, Yugoslavia/Serbia, p/ch)
- Ru Zhijuan (茹志鵑, 1925–1998, China, f)
- David Rubadiri (1930–2018, Nyasaland/Malawi, p/d/f)
- Bernice Rubens (1923–2004, Wales/England, f)
- Murilo Rubião (1916–1991, Brazil, f)
- Gillian Rubinstein (born 1942, England/Australia, ch)
- Renate Rubinstein (1929–1990, Netherlands, nf)
- Berta Ruck (1878–1978, India/Wales, f/nf)
- Rudy Rucker (born 1946, US, f/nf)
- Friedrich Rückert (1788–1866, Germany, p)
- Nils Johan Rud (1908–1993, Norway, f/ch)
- George Rudé (1910–1993, Norway/Australia, nf)
- Jaufre Rudel (died 1147 or after, Anatolia, p)
- Anne Rudloe (1947–2012, US, nf)
- Adolf Rudnicki (1912–1990, Poland, f/nf)
- Rudolf von Ems (c. 1200–1254, Austria, p)
- Franček Rudolf (born 1944, Yugoslavia/Slovenia, p/d)
- Kathy Rudy (born 1956, US, nf)
- Emily Ruete (1844–1924, Zanzibar, nf), birth name Salama bint Said
- Alan Rufus (c. 1040–1093, France/England, nf)
- John Ruganda (1941–2007, Uganda, d)
- Andrew Rugasira (living, Uganda, nf)
- Mwangi Ruheni (born 1934, Kenya, f/nf/ch)
- Gabriel Ruhumbika (born 1938, Tanzania, f)
- Manuel Rui (born 1941, Angola, p/f/d)
- Muriel Rukeyser (1913–1980, US, p)
- Ann Rule (1931–2015, US, nf)
- Juan Rulfo (1917–1986, Mexico, f)
- Zygmunt Rumel (1915–1943, Poland, p)
- Rumi (1207–1273, Persia, p/nf)
- Paul-Eerik Rummo (born 1942, USSR/Estonia, p/d/nf)
- Rúnar Rúnarsson (born 1977, Iceland, d)
- James Runcie (born 1959, England, f/d)
- Katherine Rundell (born 1987, England, ch/f)
- Johan Ludvig Runeberg (1804–1877, Finland, p)
- Kristina Rungano (born 1963, S Rhodesia/Zimbabwe, p/f)
- Dimitrij Rupel (born 1946, Yugoslavia/Slovenia, nf)
- Layla Sarahat Rushani (c. 1952/1954–2004, Afghanistan/Netherlands, p)
- Mohammed ibn Rushayd (1259–1321, Ceuta, nf)
- Abu Rushd (1919–2010, India/Bangladesh, f)
- Salman Rushdie (born 1947, India/US, f/nf)
- John Ruskin (1819–1900, England, nf)
- Milen Ruskov (born 1966, Bulgaria, f)
- Joanna Russ (1937–2011, US, f/nf/ch)
- Eric Frank Russell (1905–1978, England, f)
- Mary Doria Russell (born 1950, US, f)
- Nipsey Russell (1918–2005, US, p)
- Rachel Renée Russell (born 1959, US, ch)
- William Clark Russell (1844–1911, England, f/nf)
- Tim Russert (1950–2008, US, nf)
- Alecu Russo (1819–1859, Moldavia/Romania, p)
- Richard Paul Russo (born 1954, US, f)
- Cyprian Thomas Rust (1808–1895, England, nf)
- Shota Rustaveli (c. 1160 – post-1220, Georgia, p)
- Doina Ruști (born 1957, Romania, f)
- Rutebeuf (fl. 1245–1285, France, p)
- Samuel Rutherford (c. 1600–1661, Scotland/England, nf)
- Thomas Rutherford (1712–1771, England, nf)
- Edward Rutherfurd (born 1948, England, f), pseudonym of Francis Edward Wintle
- Grey Gowrie (1939–2021, Ireland/Wales, f)
- Frank Rutter (1876–1937, England, nf)
- Mary Ruwart (born 1949, US, nf)
- Field Ruwe (born 1955, Zambia/US, f/nf)
- Rose Rwakasisi (born 1945, Uganda, f/nf)
- William Bolitho Ryall (1891–1930, S Africa/England, nf)
- Brendan Ryan (born 1963, Australia, p)
- Chris Ryan (born 1961, England, f/nf)
- Gig Ryan (born 1956, England/Australia, p), pseudonym of Elizabeth Anne Martina Ryan
- Pam Muñoz Ryan (born 1951, US, ch)
- Nan Ryan (1936–2017, US, f)
- Perry T. Ryan (born 1962, US, nf)
- Viktor Rydberg (1828–1895, Sweden, f/p)
- Lucjan Rydel (1870–1918, Poland, d/p)
- Caroline Ryder (born 1980, England/US, nf)
- Cynthia Rylant (born 1954, US, ch/nf/p)
- Geoff Ryman (born 1951, Canada/US, f)
- Thomas Rymer (c. 1643–1713, England, p/nf)
- Jarosław Marek Rymkiewicz (1935–2022, Poland, p/d/nf)
- Ryo Mizuno (水野良, born 1963, Japan, nf)
- Ryōgo Narita (成田良悟, born 1980, Japan, f)
- Ryōkan (良寛大愚, 1758–1831, Japan, p)
- Youssef Rzouga (born 1956, Tunisia, p/nf)
