= Račanin =

Račanin (Serbian Cyrillic: Рачанин) is a demonym of people of Rača, Bajina Bašta, or more often, an epithet of members of the brotherhood of the Rača monastery. It may refer to:

- Čirjak Račanin (1660–1731), Serbian Orthodox monk and writer
- Kiprijan Račanin (1650–1730), Serbian Orthodox monk and writer
- Jerotej Račanin (1650–1727), Serbian Orthodox monk and writer
- Teodor Račanin (1500–1560), Serbian Orthodox monk and writer
- Simeon Račanin (fl. 1676–1700), Serbian Orthodox monk and writer
- Hristifor Račanin (1595–1670), Serbian Orthodox monk and writer
