= Grigorije Račanin =

Serbian monk and writer (1668-1739)

Grigorije Račanin (Serbian Cyrillic: Григорије Рачанин; Bajina Bašta, Serbia, after 1668 - Szentendre, Habsburg monarchy, after 1739) was a Serbian monk and writer. He is best remembered for his travelogue on rafting in the Balkans in 1739. He was a contemporary of Gavrilo Stefanović Venclović, also a member of the Rača monastery and its literary School of Rača.

A copy of his major work -- Dravom i Dunavom od Osijeka do Krajove u Rumuniji—is archived in the Narodna biblioteka Srbije (National Library of Serbia) in Belgrade. The original manuscript is now lost, though a copy testifies to the existence of a travelogue manuscript written by him after taking a trip along the "Drava and Danube from Osijek to Krajova in Romania" and back in 1739 as the title suggests.

Monk Grigorije Račanin lived and worked in the scriptorium of the old Rača monastery in Bajina Bašta before settling in Szentendre.

== Works ==
- Dravom I Dunavom od Osijeka to Krajove u Ruminiji, 1739
- Panonijom s krstom račanskim, vol.I-III
- Religious and secular texts.

== See also ==
- Jerotej Račanin
- Kiprijan Račanin
- Ćirjak Račanin
- Simeon Račanin
- Teodor Račanin
- Hristifor Račanin
- Prohor Račanin
- Gavrilo Stefanović Venclović
- Jefrem Janković Tetovac

== Sources ==
- Skerlić, Jovan (1921). Istorija srpske književnosti. Beograd.
