= Scriptorium =

Room in medieval European monasteries for writing

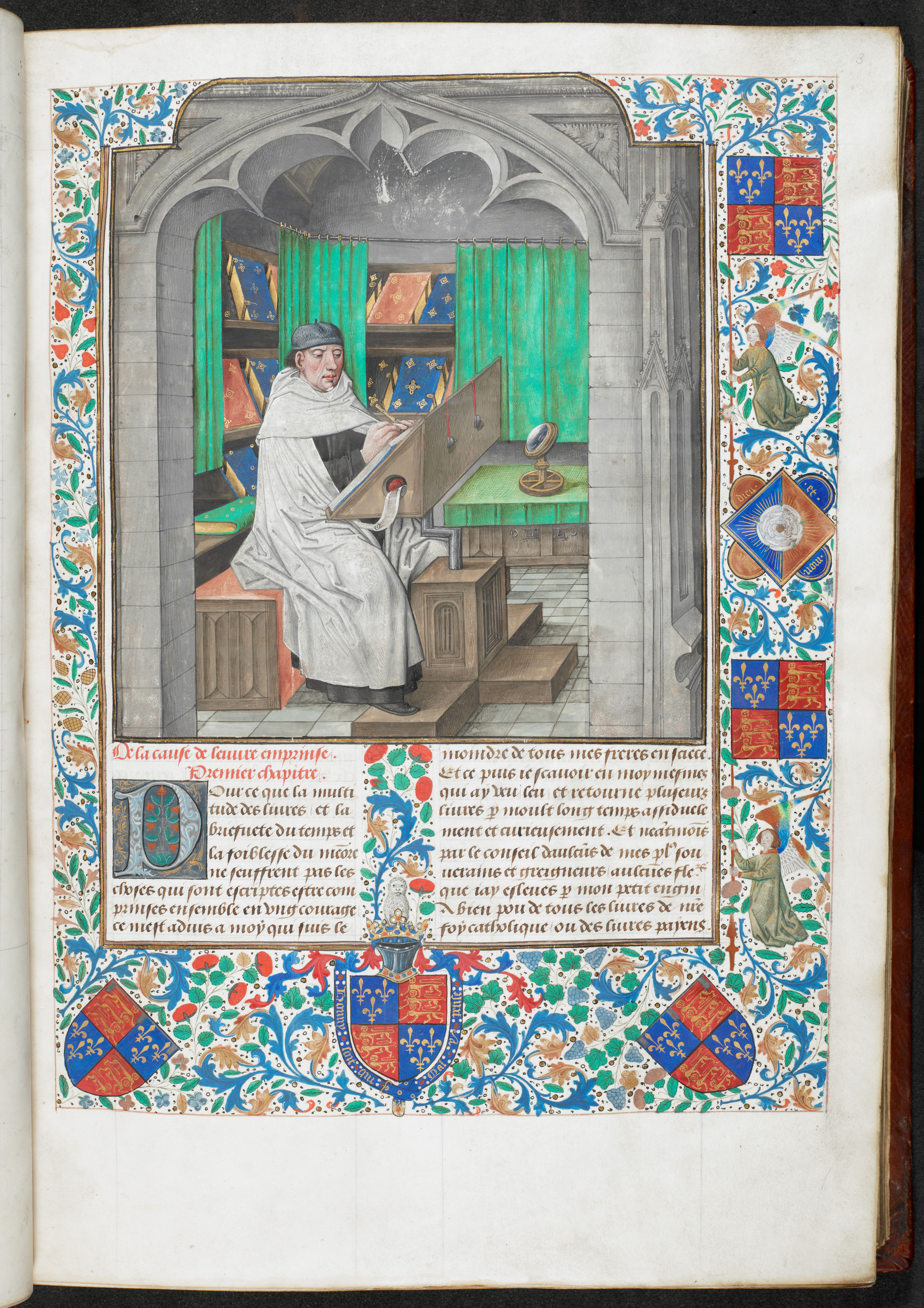
Miniature of Vincent of Beauvais writing in a manuscript of the Speculum Historiale in French, Bruges, c. 1478–1480, British Library Royal 14 E. i, vol. 1, f. 3, probably representing the library of the Dukes of Burgundy.

A scriptorium (/skrɪpˈtɔːriəm/) was a writing room in medieval European monasteries for the copying and illuminating of manuscripts by scribes.

The term has perhaps been over-used—only some monasteries had special rooms set aside for scribes. Often they worked in the monastery library or in their own rooms. Most medieval images of scribing show single figures in well-appointed studies, although these are generally author portraits of well-known authors or translators. Increasingly, lay scribes and illuminators from outside the monastery also assisted the clerical scribes. By the later Middle Ages secular manuscript workshops were common, and many monasteries bought more books than they produced themselves.

== The functional outset ==
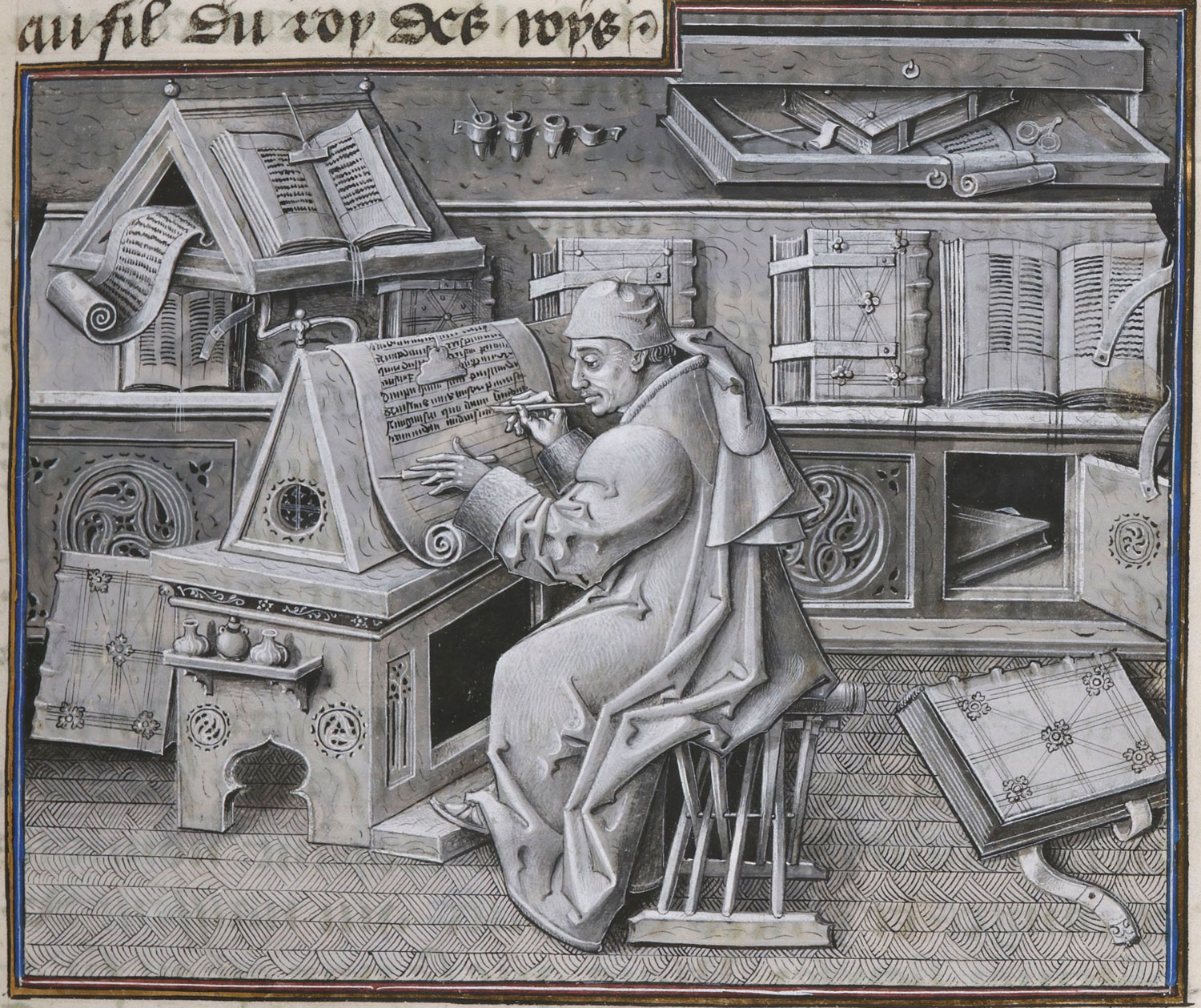
Late 15th-century miniature of the author and translator Jean Miélot (died 1472) depicts him writing his compilation of the Miracles of Our Lady, one of his many popular works.

When monastic institutions arose in the early sixth century (the first European monastic writing dates from 517), they defined European literary culture and selectively preserved the literary history of the West. Monks copied Jerome's Latin Vulgate Bible and the commentaries and letters of early Church Fathers for missionary purposes as well as for use within the monastery.

In the copying process, there was typically a division of labor among the monks who readied the parchment for copying by smoothing and chalking the surface, those who ruled the parchment and copied the text, and those who illuminated the text. Sometimes a single monk would engage in all of these stages to prepare a manuscript. The illuminators of manuscripts worked in collaboration with scribes in intricate varieties of interaction that preclude any simple understanding of monastic manuscript production.

The products of the monasteries provided a valuable medium of exchange. Comparisons of characteristic regional, periodic as well as contextual styles of handwriting do reveal social and cultural connections among them, as new hands developed and were disseminated by travelling individuals, respectively what these individuals represented, and by the examples of manuscripts that passed from one cloister to another. Recent studies follow the approach, that scriptoria developed in relative isolation, to the extent that paleographers are sometimes able to identify the product of each writing centre and to date it accordingly.

By the start of the 13th century, secular workshops developed, where professional scribes stood at writing-desks to work the orders of customers, and during the Late Middle Ages the praxis of writing was becoming not only confined to being generally a monastic or regal activity. However, the practical consequences of private workshops, and as well the invention of the printing press vis-a-vis monastic scriptoria is a complex theme.

There is also evidence that women scribes, in religious or secular contexts, produced texts in the medieval period. Archaeologists identified lapis lazuli, a pigment used in the decoration of medieval illuminated manuscripts, embedded in the dental calculus of remains found in a religious women's community in Germany, which dated to the 11th-12th centuries. Chelles Abbey, established in France during the early medieval period, was also well known for its scriptorium, where nuns produced manuscripts and religious texts. There is also evidence of Jewish women working as scribes of Hebrew texts from the 13th to 16th centuries, though these women primarily worked out of their homes rather than religious institutions, as daughters and wives of scribes. Women were not only the producers of these texts, but could also be the consumers or commissioners of them. There were also women who worked as professional, secular scribes, including Clara Hätzlerin in 15th century Augsburg, who has at least nine surviving manuscripts signed by or attributed to her.

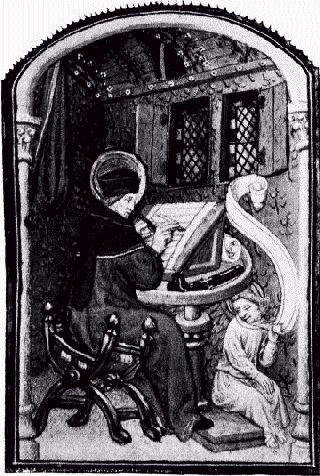
Saint Matthew in a mediæval scriptorium (Book of Prayers, 15th century (British Library, Sloane MS 2468)

== The physical scriptorium ==
Much as medieval libraries do not correspond to the exalted sketches from Umberto Eco's The Name of the Rose, it seems that ancient written accounts, as well as surviving buildings, and archaeological excavations do not invariably attest to the evidence of scriptoria. Scriptoria, in the physical sense of a room set aside for the purpose, perhaps mostly existed in response to specific scribal projects; for example, when a monastic (and) or regal institution wished a large number of texts copied.

References in modern scholarly writings to 'scriptoria' typically refer to the collective written output of a monastery, somewhat like the chancery in the early regal times is taken to refer to a specific fashion of modelling formulars, but especially traditional is the view that scriptoria was a necessary adjunct to a library, as per the entry in du Cange, 1678 'scriptorium'.

=== San Giovanni Evangelista, Rimini ===
At this church whose patron was Galla Placidia (died 450), paired rectangular chambers flanking the apse, accessible only from each aisle, have been interpreted as paired (Latin and Greek) libraries and perhaps scriptoria. The well-lit niches half a meter deep, provisions for hypocausts beneath the floors to keep the spaces dry, have prototypes in the architecture of Roman libraries.

=== Cassiodorus and the Vivarium ===
The monastery built in the second quarter of the 6th century under the supervision of Cassiodorus at the Vivarium near Squillace in southern Italy contained a scriptorium, for the purpose of collecting, copying, and preserving texts.

Cassiodorus' description of his monastery contained a purpose-built scriptorium, with a sundial, a water-clock, and a "perpetual lamp," that is, one that supplied itself with oil from a reservoir. The scriptorium would also have contained desks where the monks could sit and copy texts, as well as the necessary ink wells, penknives, and quills. Cassiodorus also established a library where, at the end of the Roman Empire, he attempted to bring Greek learning to Latin readers and to preserve texts both sacred and secular for future generations. As its unofficial librarian, Cassiodorus collected as many manuscripts as he could, he also wrote treatises aimed at instructing his monks in the proper uses of texts. In the end, however, the library at the Vivarium was dispersed and lost, though it was still active around 630.

=== Cistercians ===
The scriptoria of the Cistercian order seem to have been similar to those of the Benedictines. The mother house at Cîteaux, one of the best-documented high-medieval scriptoria, developed a severe "house style" in the first half of the 12th century. The 12th-century scriptorium of Cîteaux and its products, in the context of Cistercian scriptoria, have been studied by Yolanta Załuska, L'enluminure et le scriptorium de Cîteaux au XIIe siècle (Brecht:Cîteaux) 1989.

== Institutions ==
In Byzantium or Eastern Roman Empire learning maintained importance and numerous monastic 'scriptoria' were known for producing Bible/Gospel illuminations, along with workshops that copied numerous classical and Hellenistic works. Records show that one such monastic community was that of Mount Athos, which maintained a variety of illuminated manuscripts and ultimately accumulated over 10,000 books.

=== Benedictines ===
Cassiodorus' contemporary, Benedict of Nursia, allowed his monks to read the great works of the pagans in the monastery he founded at Monte Cassino in 529. The creation of a library here initiated the tradition of Benedictine scriptoria, where the copying of texts not only provided materials needed in the routines of the community and served as work for hands and minds otherwise idle, but also produced a marketable end-product. Saint Jerome stated that the products of the scriptorium could be a source of revenue for the monastic community, but Benedict cautioned, "If there be skilled workmen in the monastery, let them work at their art in all humility".

In the earliest Benedictine monasteries, the writing room was actually a corridor open to the central quadrangle of the cloister. The space could accommodate about twelve monks, who were protected from the elements only by the wall behind them and the vaulting above. Monasteries built later in the Middle Ages placed the scriptorium inside, near the heat of the kitchen or next to the calefactory. The warmth of the later scriptoria served as an incentive for unwilling monks to work on the transcription of texts (since the charter house was rarely heated).

==== St. Gall ====
The Benedictine Plan of St. Gall is a sketch of an idealised monastery dating from 819 to 826, which shows the scriptorium and library attached to the northeast corner of the main body of the church; this is not reflected by the evidence of surviving monasteries. Although the purpose of the plan is unknown, it clearly shows the desirability of scriptoria within a wider body of monastic structures at the beginning of the 9th century.

=== Cistercians ===
There is evidence that in the late 13th century, the Cistercians would allow certain monks to perform their writing in a small cell "which could not... contain more than one person". These cells were called scriptoria because of the copying done there, even though their primary function was not as a writing room.

=== Carthusians ===
The Carthusians viewed copying religious texts as their missionary work to the greater Church; the strict solitude of the Carthusian order necessitated that the manual labor of the monks be practiced within their individual cells, thus many monks engaged in the transcription of texts. In fact, each cell was equipped as a copy room, with parchment, quill, inkwell, and ruler. Guigues du Pin, or Guigo, the architect of the order, cautioned, "Let the brethren take care the books they receive from the cupboard do not get soiled with smoke or dirt; books are as it were the everlasting food of our souls; we wish them to be most carefully kept and most zealously made."

=== The Orthodox church ===
==== The Resava ====
After the establishment of Manasija Monastery by Stefan Lazarević in the early 15th century, many educated monks have gathered there. They fostered copying and literary work that by its excellence and production changed the history of the South Slavic literature and languages spreading its influence all over the Orthodox Balkans. One of the most famous scholars of the so-called School of Resava was Constantine the Philosopher /Konstantin Filozof/, an influential writer and biographer of the founder of the school (Stefan Lazarević).

==== Rača ====
During the Turkish invasions of the Serbian lands (which lasted from the end of the 14th to the beginning of the 19th centuries) the monastery was an important centre of culture. The scriptorium of each monastery was a bastion of learning where illuminated manuscripts were being produced by monk-scribes, mostly Serbian liturgical books and Old Serbian Vita. hagiographies of kings and archbishops.

Numerous scribes of the Serbian Orthodox Church books—at the term of the 16th and the beginning of the 18th centuries—who worked in the Rača monastery are named in Serbian literature – "The Račans". Among the monk-scribes the most renown are the illuminator Hieromonk Hristifor Račanin, Kiprijan Račanin, Jerotej Račanin, Teodor Račanin and Gavril Stefanović Venclović. These are well-known Serbian monks and writers that are the link between literary men and women of the late medieval (Late Middle Ages) and Baroque periods in art, architecture and literature in particular.

== Monastic rules ==
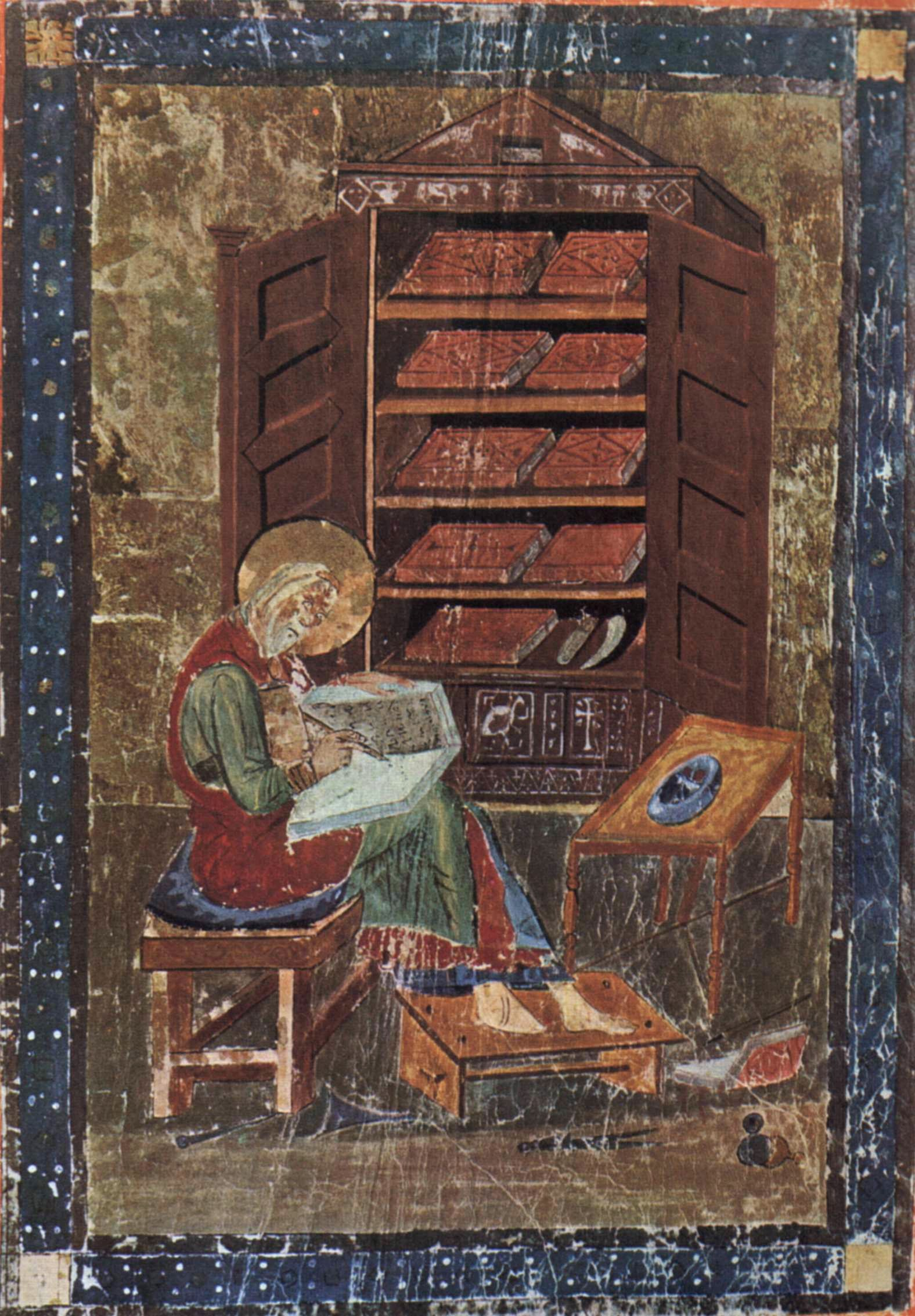
Ezra in the Codex Amiatinus, believed to be based on a portrait of Cassiodorus in his library. Monkwearmouth-Jarrow Abbey, before 716

=== Cassiodorus' Institutes ===
Although it is not a monastic rule as such, Cassiodorus did write his Institutes as a teaching guide for the monks at Vivarium, the monastery he founded on his family's land in southern Italy. A classically educated Roman convert, Cassiodorus wrote extensively on scribal practices. He cautions over-zealous scribes to check their copies against ancient, trustworthy exemplars and to take care not to change the inspired words of scripture because of grammatical or stylistic concerns. He declared "every work of the Lord written by the scribe is a wound inflicted on Satan", for "by reading the Divine Scripture he wholesomely instructs his own mind and by copying the precepts of the Lord he spreads them far and wide". Cassiodorus did include the classical texts of ancient Rome and Greece in the monastic library. This was probably because of his upbringing, but was, nonetheless, unusual for a monastery of the time. When his monks copied these texts, Cassiodorus encouraged them to amend texts for both grammar and style.

=== Saint Benedict ===
The more famous monastic treatise of the 7th century, Saint Benedict of Nursia's Rule, fails to mention the labor of transcription by name, though his institution, the monastery of Montecassino, developed one of the most influential scriptoria, at its acme in the 11th century, which made the abbey "the greatest center of book production in South Italy in the High Middle Ages". Here was developed and perfected the characteristic "Cassinese" Beneventan script under Abbot Desiderius.

The Rule of Saint Benedict does explicitly call for monks to have ready access to books during two hours of compulsory daily reading and during Lent, when each monk is to read a book in its entirety. Thus each monastery was to have its own extensive collection of books, to be housed either in armarium (book chests) or a more traditional library. However, because the only way to obtain a large quantity of books in the Middle Ages was to copy them, in practice this meant that the monastery had to have a way to transcribe texts in other collections. An alternative translation of Benedict's strict guidelines for the oratory as a place for silent, reverent prayer actually hints at the existence of a scriptorium. In Chapter 52 of his Rule, Benedict's warns: "Let the oratory be what it is called, and let nothing else be done or stored there". But condatur translates both as stored and to compose or write, thus leaving the question of Benedict's intentions for manuscript production ambiguous. The earliest commentaries on the Rule of Saint Benedict describe the labor of transcription as the common occupation of the community, so it is also possible that Benedict failed to mention the scriptorium by name because of the integral role it played within the monastery.

==== Saint Ferréol ====
Monastic life in the Middle Ages was strictly centered around prayer and manual labor. In the early Middle Ages, there were many attempts to set out an organization and routine for monastic life. Montalembert cites one such sixth-century document, the Rule of Saint Ferréol, as prescribing that "He who does not turn up the earth with the plough ought to write the parchment with his fingers." As this implies, the labor required of a scribe was comparable to the exertion of agriculture and other outdoor work. Another of Montalembert's examples is of a scribal note along these lines: "He who does not know how to write imagines it to be no labour, but although these fingers only hold the pen, the whole body grows weary."

=== Cistercians ===
An undated Cistercian ordinance, ranging in date from 1119 to 1152 (Załuska 1989) prescribed literae unius coloris et non depictae ("letters of one color and not ornamented"), that spread with varying degrees of literalness in parallel with the Cistercian order itself, through the priories of Burgundy and beyond.

In 1134, the Cistercian order declared that the monks were to keep silent in the scriptorium as they should in the cloister.

== Books and transcription in monastic life ==
Manuscript-writing was a laborious process in an ill-lit environment that could damage one's health. One prior complained in the tenth century:

"Only try to do it yourself and you will learn how arduous is the writer's task. It dims your eyes, makes your back ache, and knits your chest and belly together. It is a terrible ordeal for the whole body".

The director of a monastic scriptorium would be the armarius ("provisioner"), who provided the scribes with their materials and supervised the copying process. However, the armarius had other duties as well. At the beginning of Lent, the armarius was responsible for making sure that all of the monks received books to read, but he also had the ability to deny access to a particular book. By the 10th century the armarius had specific liturgical duties as well, including singing the eighth responsory, holding the lantern aloft when the abbot read, and approving all material to be read aloud in church, chapter, and refectory.

While at Vivarium c. 540–548, Cassiodorus wrote a commentary on the Psalms entitled Expositio Psalmorum as an introduction to the Psalms for individuals seeking to enter the monastic community. The work had a broad appeal outside of Cassiodorus' monastery as the subject of monastic study and reflection.

Abbot Johannes Trithemius of Sponheim wrote a letter, De Laude Scriptorum (In Praise of Scribes), to Gerlach, Abbot of Deutz in 1492 to describe for monks the merits of copying texts. Trithemius contends that the copying of texts is central to the model of monastic education, arguing that transcription enables the monk to more deeply contemplate and come to a more full understanding of the text. He then continues to praise scribes by saying "The dedicated scribe, the object of our treatise, will never fail to praise God, give pleasure to angels, strengthen the just, convert sinners, commend the humble, confirm the good, confound the proud and rebuke the stubborn". Among the reasons he gives for continuing to copy manuscripts by hand, are the historical precedent of the ancient scribes and the supremacy of transcription to all other manual labor. This description of monastic writing is especially important because it was written after the first printing presses came into popular use. Trithemius addresses the competing technology when he writes, "The printed book is made of paper and, like paper, will quickly disappear. But the scribe working with parchment ensures lasting remembrance for himself and for his text". Trithemius also believes that there are works that are not being printed but are worth being copied.

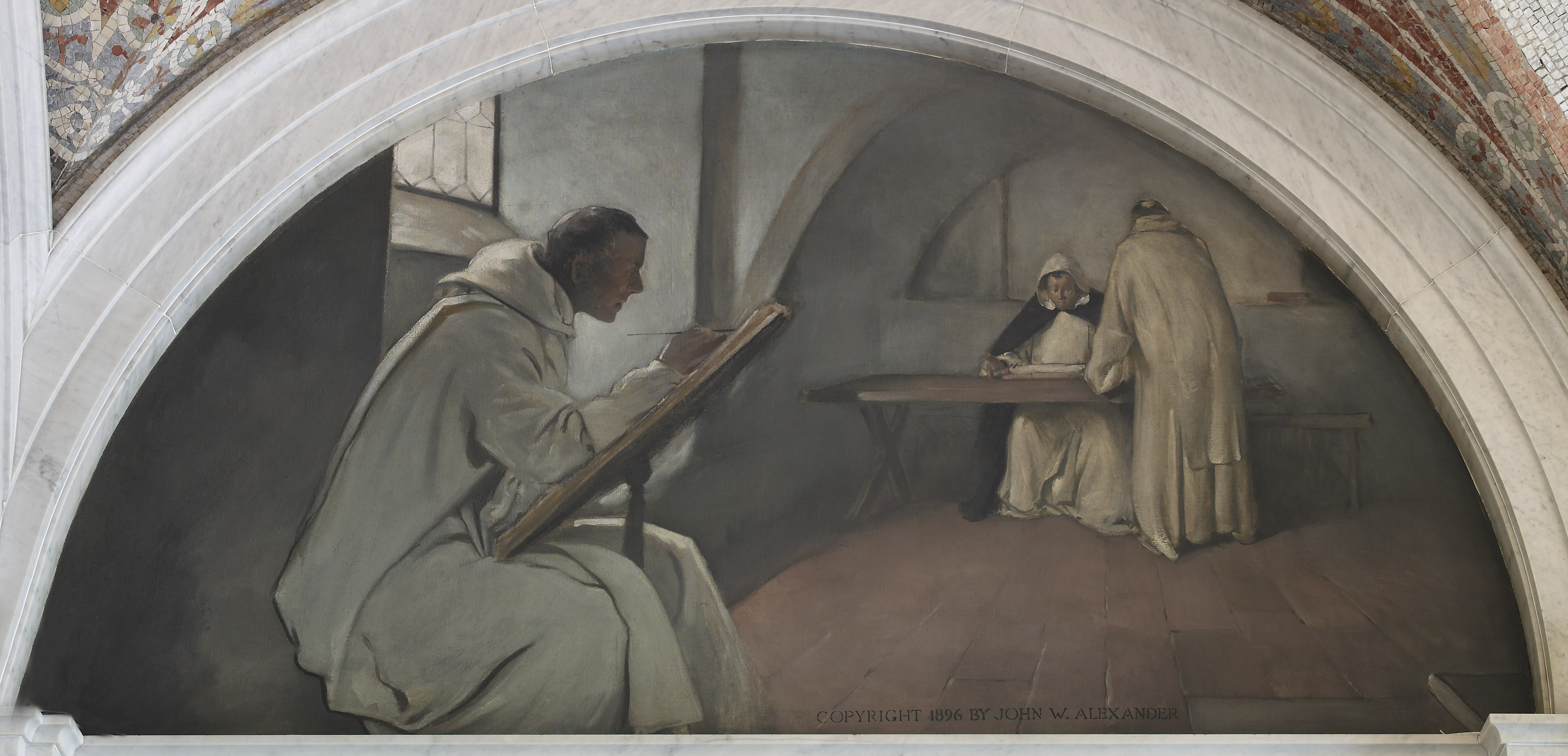
John White Alexander, Manuscript Book mural (1896), Library of Congress Thomas Jefferson Building, Washington, D.C.

In his comparison of modern and medieval scholarship, James J. O'Donnell describes monastic study in this way:

"[E]ach Psalm would have to be recited at least once a week all through the period of study. In turn, each Psalm studied separately would have to be read slowly and prayerfully, then gone through with the text in one hand (or preferably committed to memory) and the commentary in the other; the process of study would have to continue until virtually everything in the commentary has been absorbed by the student and mnemonically keyed to the individual verses of scripture, so that when the verses are recited again the whole phalanx of Cassiodorian erudition springs up in support of the content of the sacred text".

In this way, the monks of the Middle Ages came to intimately know and experience the texts that they copied. The act of transcription became an act of meditation and prayer, not a simple replication of letters.

== See also ==
Phenomena

- Manuscript
- Codex
- Manuscript culture
- Plan of Saint Gall
- Rule of Saint Benedict

Names

- Cassiodorus
- Johannes Gutenberg
- James Murray (lexicographer)

Category

- Books by century

== Sources ==
- De Hamel, Christopher (1992). Scribes and illuminators (Repr. ed.). Univ. of Toronto Press. ISBN 0-8020-7707-2.
