= William Ritter =

William Ritter may refer to:

- William Ritter (writer) (1867–1955), Swiss writer
- William Emerson Ritter (1856–1944), American biologist

== See also ==
- Bill Ritter (born 1956), American politician
- Bill Ritter (journalist) (born 1950), American television news anchor
