= Jorge Rivera =

Jorge Rivera may refer to:

- Jorge Rivera López (1930–2024), Argentine television and film actor
- Jorge Rivera Nieves (born 1951), Puerto Rican television news anchorman
- Jorge Rivera Vicuña (1907–1963), Chilean lawyer and politician
- Jorge Rivera (basketball) (born 1973), basketball player from San Juan, Puerto Rico
- Jorge Rivera (wrestler), Mexican professional wrestler known as Skayde
- Jorge Rivera (fighter) (born 1972), American mixed martial artist
- Jorge Rivera (footballer, born 1978), Colombian football goalkeeper
- Jorge Rivera (footballer, born 1996), Puerto Rican football midfielder
- Jorge B. Rivera (1935–2004), Argentine writer
- Jorge Rivera-Herrans, Puerto Rican actor and singer-songwriter, Epic: The Musical
