= Perry Ryan =

Perry Ryan may refer to

- Perry T. Ryan, author and Assistant Attorney-General of Kentucky
- Sylvester Perry Ryan, former MP in the Canadian House of Commons
- Perry Ryan (footballer), footballer who currently plays for Bognor Regis Town, on loan from Portsmouth
