= Simeon Račanin =

Serbian Orthodox monk and translator (1676-1700)

Simeon Račanin (Serbian Cyrillic: Симеон Рачанин; fl. 1676–1700) was a Serbian Orthodox monk and translator. He is mentioned in 1700 along with several other monks at the Rača monastery, all wearing the epithet Račanin: Kiprijan Račanin, Jerotej Račanin, Hristifor Račanin, Ćirjak Račanin, Teodor Račanin, and Gavrilo Stefanović Venclović-Račanin. One of Simeon's works, dated to 1676, is held at the National Museum (Prague).

He was one of an elite group of educated and anonymous monks (addressed only by their monastic name) of the Monastery of Rača in Bajina Bašta, near the Drina River, to make his mark in the eighteenth-century Serbian literature. All the members of the School of Rača spoke and wrote little about their past; giving precedent to the work at hand. We do know, however, that Simeon was orphaned early, and brought up by his relations. He was sent to the Rača Monastery where he received an excellent education for the period. He learned Greek, Latin, Old Church Slavonic and most of the Slavic dialects and languages, including Russian and Polish.

== Works ==
The Museum of the Serbian Orthodox Church is in possession of a small number of ornately decorated manuscripts by unknown scribes, though a few have been identified, namely Simeon Račanin.

== See also ==
- Gavrilo Stefanović Venclović
- Čirjak Račanin (1660–1731), Serbian Orthodox monk and writer
- Kiprijan Račanin (1650–1730), Serbian Orthodox monk and writer
- Jerotej Račanin (1650–1727), Serbian Orthodox monk and writer
- Teodor Račanin (1500–1560), Serbian Orthodox monk and writer
- Hristifor Račanin (1595–1670), Serbian Orthodox monk and writer
- Prohor Račanin, Serbian Orthodox monk
- Grigorije Račanin (fl. 1739), Serbian writer
- Jefrem Janković Tetovac

== Sources ==
- Skerlić, Jovan (1953). Istorija nove srpske književnosti. Prosveta. pp. 26–28.
