= Gregory II of Ras =

Grigorije II of Ras
- Bishop of Ras
- Church: Serbian Orthodox Church

Personal details
- Born: c. 1250
- Died: 1321
- Occupation: Monk-scribe

Sainthood
- Feast day: 12 September (Gregorian); 30 August (Julian)

Grigorije II of Ras (c. 1250 – 1321), was a Serbian medieval monk-scribe whose writing flourished from 1282 to 1321. He is now venerated as a saint.

The Serbian Orthodox Church celebrates Grigorije as a saint during the holiday of the Assembly of the Holy Serbian Enlighteners and Teachers on 30 August (Julian Calendar) or 12 September (Gregorian Calendar). Monk of the Hilandar monastery and eventually bishop of Ras, he bore a name already made famous by earlier scribes in that institution's century-long history as a center of Serbian book production. He died in 1321, leaving behind a legacy of elegant, illuminated volumes whose survivor spanned almost four decades (1282 to 1321).

He completed transcribing the Church Law Code (Nomocanon) known as the "Raška krmčija" at Ras in 1305. The manuscript, though preserved in its entirety, is divided physically and is kept in Moscow today, in the State Historical Museum and in the Russian State Library. Grigorije of Ras is also known for the verses he composed on a silver cross which he made together with King Stefan Milutin.

== See also ==
- List of Serbian saints
- Medieval Serbian literature
