= Alice Rollins-Crane =

American ethnologist, author, business owner, and miner

Alice Rollins-Crane Moraczewski (also Morajeski/Morajeska; 1856 – April 4, 1929) was an American ethnologist, writer, business owner, and miner well known for her work with the Apache and her time in Alaska and the Yukon. She is the compiler of Smiles and Tears from the Klondyke, and the author of Our Klondyke Success and various other short pieces.

== Early life ==
Alice Rollins was born in Indiana in 1856, the oldest of five children born to J.J. and Hannah Rollins and then moved to Ohio. In the late 1870s, Rollins's widowed mother relocated the family to Iowa, where she would remarry in 1893. In 1877, Rollins married Frank Higbee, a traveling salesman, and they had a son, R. Fred Higbee. Frank and Alice would divorce in 1880, only to remarry on Christmas Eve of that year. They divorced a second time in 1890, and Alice travelled west.

In 1894, Rollins married Lorin P. Crane, apparently a retired army officer in Los Angeles. Eventually, they too, divorced.

== Time in Arizona ==
Rollins-Crane spent nine years living with the Apache in Arizona, becoming acquainted with Thomas Jeffords. [the first is an unsubstantiated claim by Rollins herself; there is no proof she ever lived among Native Americans for any amount of time]. Rollins-Crane wrote an essay refuting the idea that no sites in the United States deserved the serious attention of archaeologists, saying that La Casa Grande (today the Montezuma Castle National Monument) in Arizona did deserve this attention, and that even in the 16th century, the local native peoples had no tradition as to its builders.

It was also during this time that Rollins-Crane became a devotee of Chinese herbal medicine as an alternative to surgical procedures.

== Time in Alaska and the Yukon ==
Rollins-Crane arrived in the Yukon sometime in 1898, likely as a stampeder during the Klondike Gold Rush but also, she claimed, "armed with a government commission from the Smithsonian Bureau of Ethnology" as well as "credentials from several newspapers and journals, which were duly honoured by the Canadian officials." She climbed the White Pass Trail and then ran the Whitehorse Rapids, claiming to be the first Euro-American woman to do so.

In Dawson City, Rollins-Crane worked as a writer, and miner while still continuing to perform some ethnological work. In 1900, she was employed as a prison inspector, and was sent by the bureau of ethnology of the Smithsonian Institution to study and report on the prison life. She also studied the traditions of the indigenous peoples in the Yukon and Alaska, and sent some photos to the Smithson Institution. Though none of her notes have survived, she is known to have performed interviews with Yukon Tagish First Nations on death row about their religious beliefs, and concluded that they may have been sun-worshippers.

Rollins-Crane became the domestic partner of William Galpin, a writer and miner living in Dawson City. In 1903, however, she launched a lawsuit against him for assault and threatening to kill her. According to her testimony, she and Galpin had become estranged when they disputed over the authorship of The Widow of Dawson, both claiming to be the writer. She sent the manuscript to publishers, and he ordered it sent back. The assault charges against Galpin were dismissed on May 13, 1903. However, Galpin would later charge Alice with perjury.

It was during this period that Rollins-Crane met her third husband, miner Witold Moraczewski, later Victor Morajeski, who was born in Warsaw, Russian Empire. He claimed to be a count. According to newspaper reports of the time, William Galpin had been pursuing Rollins-Crane with propositions of marriage. She sought shelter in a roadhouse kept by Moraczewski, where he allegedly protected her from assault by Galpin. In 1904, both Rollins-Crane and Moraczewski were jailed for several months in Nome, Alaska on charges of theft after being unable to pay a bail of $5,000 (~$136,095 in 2024). Prior to this, Rollins-Crane had been fined for contempt of court three times. In 1905, Victor Moraczewski told newspapers that he would sue the American government on the grounds that his wife had been the victim of mistreatment and personal violence at the hands of government officials.

During this time she also wrote for National Geographic Magazine and the Dawson Daily News.

== Mining activities ==
In 1898, Rollins-Crane organized and became the manager of the Los Angeles Woman's Mining Syndicate, a group of about fifty women who advanced $2500 (~$80,230 in 2024) for the development of Yukon mining properties. According to the contract, the property would be owned by Alice Rollins-Crane, but a certain percentage would be paid back to the syndicate. The syndicate was never officially incorporated, but in 1900, the same women organized the Los Angeles and Yukon Mining Company, and acquired an interest in Rollins-Crane's mining properties, including 36 below discovery on Hunker Creek for the Los Angeles and Yukon Mining Company. William Galpin, Rollins-Crane's erstwhile domestic partner, wrote to stockholders in 1903 to tell them that Rollins-Crane "was no lady" and "was not working in the interests of other stockholders." Alice was forced to step down from the management of the company, although she retained her interests in it.

== Later life ==
After she left the North, Alice Moraczewski opened the Alaska Glacier Ice Cream Parlor in Rhyolite, Nevada. She and her husband, Victor Moraczewski, owned the Owls Head Silver Mine North East of Tucson, and handled the estate of Tom Jeffords, the 'blood brother' of the Apache Chief Cochise.

== Death ==
Rollins-Crane is buried in Los Angeles, in an unmarked grave.

== Legacy ==
Some of Rollins-Crane's photograph collections of the Yukon are held by the Smithsonian Institution.
