= Ćirjak Račanin =

Serbian writer and monk (1660-1731)

Ćirjak Račanin (Serbian Cyrillic: Ћирјак Рачанин; probably the area of Bajina Bašta, Serbia c. 1660 – Szentendre, Hungary 1731) was a Serbian writer and monk.

There was as much of the moralist as of the wit in Ćirjak Račanin, and that side found its purest expression in devotional texts, which he is said to have not only ornately decorated and illuminated but composed during long nights of guard duty in the tower of the fortified Rača monastery. The Turks several times carried out reprisals against the monks for engaging in educational activities and promoting Serbian culture (copying ancient church manuscripts and writing books and disseminating them). Eventually, the monks were forced to take their archive with them and with their spiritual leader, Arsenije III Čarnojević, went to join the Christian forces in the Battle of Zenta in northern Serbia. At the time Serbia, with the help of Austria, harbored hope to rid itself of the Ottoman yoke. Two of Serbia's greatest sons, Đorđe Branković, Count of Podgorica, and Jovan Monasterlija were gathering volunteers for the ultimate confrontation. Ćirjak Račanin, like his fellow monks, joined the insurgents, led by Monasterlija, who was under the supreme commander of the Austrian crown.

After the defeat of the Ottoman army, Ćirjak Račanin left the Austrian army to give his full attention to Serbian politics and his writing career.

== Work ==
An Anthology (Zbornik) of the Rača monastery from 1649, now located at the Belgrade University Library in Belgrade, contains a short history of the Serbian people from the time of King Stefan Milutin, mid-13th century until the middle of the 17th century when it was written. The writer of this book was attributed to Ćirjak Račanin.

== See also ==
- Račanin, disambiguation page
- Gavrilo Stefanović Venclović
- Kiprijan Račanin (1650–1730), Serbian Orthodox monk and writer
- Jerotej Račanin (1650–1727), Serbian Orthodox monk and writer
- Teodor Račanin (1500–1560), Serbian Orthodox monk and writer
- Simeon Račanin (fl. 1676–1700), Serbian Orthodox monk and writer
- Hristifor Račanin (1595–1670), Serbian Orthodox monk and writer
- Prohor Račanin, Serbian Orthodox monk
- Grigorije Račanin (fl. 1739), Serbian writer
- Jefrem Janković Tetovac

== Sources ==
- Stanoje Stanojević (1928). Narodna enciklopedija srpsko-hrvatsko-slovenacka. Izdavac̆: Bibliografski zavod d.d. "Ćirjak Raćanin"
- Jovan Skerlić, Istorija nove srpske književnosti (Belgrade, 1914, 1921) pages 26–28.
