= Hristifor Račanin =

Serbian scribe (1595-1670)

Hristifor Račanin (Serbian Cyrillic: Христофор Рачанин; c. 1595 – 1670) was a Serbian scribe working on ornately decorated manuscripts. He is best known for the "Psalter with Additions" (Psaltir s posledovanjem), written (c. 1490s) much before its last foreign printing by Marco Ginammi and his son Bartolo in Venice in 1638. He was the abbot of the Rača monastery on the Drina River when he completed the Psalter in 1645.

The Museum of the Serbian Orthodox Church has a small number of ornately decorated (illuminated) manuscripts by unknown scribes, though a few have been identified, namely Priest-Monk Hristifor Račanin. His name has been preserved in the manuscripts in the Museum collection.

Born in the 1670s, Hristifor would soon enter the monastery seeking knowledge. A Serbian monastery in the eighteenth century was considered the bastion of learning. In fact, the Eastern Orthodox Church was a manifestation of knowledge and learning at a time when a torrent of Turkish invaders swept the Balkans.

Hristifor nowadays scarcely earns a mention in the historiography of Serbian literature. In his day, however, he was much read in Serbia and Imperial Russia. In 1688, during the Austro-Turkish wars, when the ousted Turks were recovering and advancing toward Rača Monastery, near the Drina River, the abbot called for a general evacuation. Hristifor and other monks packed up and left to join their compatriots in northern Serbia. Maximilian II Emanuel, Elector of Bavaria, led the capture of Belgrade in 1688 from the Ottoman Turks, with the full support of Serbian insurgents under the command of Jovan Monasterlija.

Literary critic Jovan Skerlić gives credit to Kiprijan Račanin, Jerotej Račanin, Ćirjak Račanin, Grigorije Račanin, Simeon Račanin, Teodor Račanin, Gavril Stefanović Venclović (also called Račanin), and Hristifor Račanin for keeping Serbian literature alive after Serbia's occupation by the Turks. In 1668, he transcribed Teodosije's Service to St. Petar of Koriša now preserved in its entirety in the Collection of Baltazar Bogišić at Cavtat. All this led up to the Great Turkish War, where Serbian volunteers joined the Austrian army in the thousands to defeat the Turks from invading Europe. Yet, both the Ottoman and Austrian empires lorded over Serbian lands until 1912, when the Turks were finally removed from the Balkan Peninsula, and with the end of the Great War came the belated disintegration of the Austro-Hungarian Empire, freeing more than a dozen lands to unite as a whole, namely the Kingdom of Serbs, Croats and Slovenes.

== See also ==
- Čirjak Račanin (1660–1731), Serbian Orthodox monk and writer
- Kiprijan Račanin (1650–1730), Serbian Orthodox monk and writer
- Jerotej Račanin (1650–1727), Serbian Orthodox monk and writer
- Teodor Račanin (1500–1560), Serbian Orthodox monk and writer
- Simeon Račanin (fl. 1676–1700), Serbian Orthodox monk and writer
- Gavrilo Stefanović Venclović, Kiprijan's student.
- Grigorije Račanin
- Jefrem Janković Tetovac
- Prohor Račanin

== Sources ==
- Skerlić, Jovan (1921). Istorija srpske književnosti. Beograd.
