= Hilary Robinson (author) =

British children's author, broadcaster, radio producer and feature writer

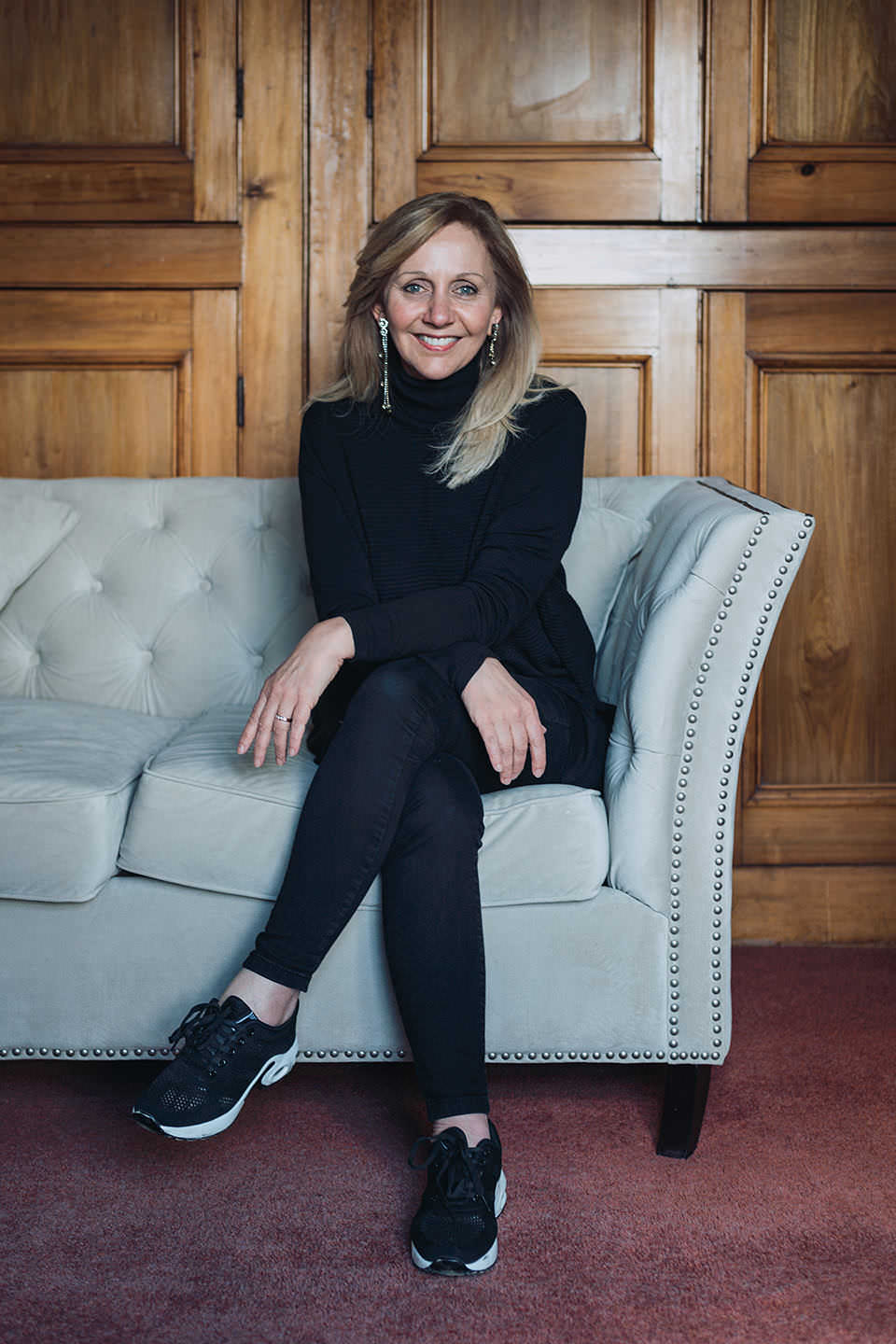
- Born: Paignton, Devon, England
- Occupations: Radio producer, children's author, feature writer, script writer
- Writing career
- Notable works: Mixed Up Fairy Tales, Where The Poppies Now Grow
- Website: hilaryrobinson.co.uk

Hilary Robinson is a British children's author of over 80 books, broadcaster, radio producer and feature writer.

== Background ==
The daughter of lecturers, Robinson grew up in Zaria, Nigeria during the Nigerian Civil War, and later in Dorset and Yorkshire. Her father, P. H. Turner, was an economist and a biographer of David Livingstone who established an educational trust and spearheaded the building of a non-profit independent school in Zaria, Nigeria. Robinson attended this school with other local and overseas children, including theatre director Rufus Norris. Later, she attended a mixed state comprehensive, Hemsworth High School, in West Yorkshire. Her mother was a lecturer in mathematics and statistics with the Open University.

== Career ==
=== Radio producer ===
Robinson worked at Radio Aire, TV-am and Yorkshire Television and the BBC's Faith and Ethics Department. She is now an independent radio producer.

== Selected Radio Producer Credits ==
- Good Morning Sunday (BBC Radio 2) Live, weekly music and faith based show (2005–2024)
- Private Peaceful, radio drama narrated by Robson Green (2008)
- Hang A Thousand Trees with Ribbons, radio drama narrated by Sophie Okondeo (2007)
- In His Hands, presented by Candi Staton (2007)
- Lenny Bruce Is Dead, presented by Simon Amstell (2008)
- Behind Enemy Lines, presented by John McCarthy (2009)
- The Robeson Files, presented by Dotun Adebayo (2011)
- Barry Humphries' Forgotten Musical Masterpieces, executive producer Hilary Robinson (6 series 2016–2023)
- Radio 2 Remembers Barry Humphries, presented by Steve Wright, executive producer Hilary Robinson (2023)
- At The Foot of the Cross, presented by Revd Kate Bottley (2024)
- Christmas Carols with the Revd Kate Bottley (2024)

== Book awards ==
=== Flo Of The Somme ===
- Historical Association – Young Quillss Award 2016

=== A Song For Will and The Lost Gardeners of Heligan ===
- Ann Trevenen Jenkin Cup, Holyer an Gof Awards 2018
- Books of Primary School age, Holyer an Gof Awards 2018

== Personal ==
Robinson lives and works in London and Yorkshire. She is a Fellow of the Royal Society of Arts and a member of the Society of Authors.

== Freedom of the City of London ==
On 2 April 2024, at an official ceremony at the Guildhall, Robinson received the Freedom of the City of London.

== Books ==
- 1995 Sarah the Spider
- 1995 Sarah the Spider Prima Spiderina
- Learning English With Ozmo
- 1999 E-mail: Jesus@Bethlehem
- 1999 Sarah the Spider and the Barn Dancers
- 1999 Sarah the Spider's Christmas Surprise
- 2000 Mr. Spotty's Potty
- 2000 Spells and Smells
- 2002 Freddie's Fears
- 2002 Pick it Up (The Green Gang)
- 2002 The Green Gang - Raffy's Party
- 2002 Scrapman Stan And The Magical Mixer Fixer
- 2003 E-mail: Jesus@Anytime
- 2003 Flynn Flies High
- 2003 Pippin's Big Jump
- 2004 Batty Betty's Spells
- 2004 How to Teach a Dragon Manners
- 2004 Mixed Up Fairy Tales
- 2005 Cinder Wellie
- 2005 Croc by the Rock (also Big Book edition)
- 2005 Pet to School Day
- 2005 Rapunzel
- 2005 The Frog Prince
- 2005 The Princess's Secret Letters
- 2006 Aladdin and the Lamp
- 2006 Over the Moon!
- 2006 The Little Match Girl
- 2006 The Royal Jumble Sale
- 2007 Pocahontas the Peacemaker
- 2007 The Princess's Secret Sleepover
- 2008 Goldilocks and the Wolf
- 2008 Snow White and the Enormous Turnip (also Big Book edition)
- 2008 The Elves and the Emperor
- 2009 Ted's Party Bus
- 2009 Three Pigs and a Gingerbread Man
- 2010 The Big Book of Magical Mix-Ups
- 2012 Hooray! It's Book Day - Franklin Watts
- 2012 The Copper Tree -
- 2012 The Copper Tree Class Christmas Surprise
- 2013 The Copper Tree Class Help A Hamster
- 2013 Mixed Up Nursery Rhymes
- 2013 Beauty, The Beast and The Pea
- 2013 Hansel and Gretel and the Ugly Duckling
- 2013 Rapunzel and the Billy Goats Gruff
- 2013 Cinderella and the Beanstalk
- 2014 Where The Poppies Now Grow
- 2014 The Christmas Truce
- 2014 Rapunzel (Must Know Stories), Franklin Watts
- 2015 Aladdin (Must Know Stories), Franklin Watts
- 2015 Tom's Sunflower
- 2015 Flo Of The Somme
- 2016 Sid's Red Card, Franklin Watts
- 2016 The Frog Prince (Must Know Series), Franklin Watts
- 2016 Favourite Mixed Up Fairy Tales
- 2016 A Song For Will – Strauss House Productions
- 2017 Christmas Fairy Tales Mix-Up - Hodder
- 2018 Peace Lilly – Strauss House Productions
- 2018 Spooky Fairy Tale Mix Up - Hodder
- 2019 Jasper Space Dog - Strauss House Productions
- 2019 Gregory Goose Is On The Loose in Space (November) - New Frontier
- 2019 Gregory Goose Is On The Loose in the Jungle (December) - New Frontier
- 2020 Jasper Viking Dog (February) - Strauss House Productions
- 2020 Gregory Goose Is On The Loose Up the Mountain (March) - New Frontier
- 2020 Gregory Goose Is On The Loose at the Fair (March) - New Frontier
- 2021 The Christmas Star - SPCK
- 2021 Ten Little Yoga Frogs - New Frontier
- 2021 Twelve Little Festive Frogs - New Frontier
- 2021 Old Tabby Brontë, The Servant's Tale - Strauss House Productions
- 2022 God's Love In A Nut Shell - SPCK
- 2022 Tatty Mouse, Rockstar - New Frontier
- 2022 Tatty Mouse - Super Racer - New Frontier
- 2023 Tatty Mouse - Christmas - New Frontier
- 2024 Paw Together For God - SPCK
- 2024 Tatty Mouse - Birthday Surprise - New Frontier
- 2025 The Murder of PC Austwick (1855–1886) - Strauss House Productions
- 2025 The Hare and the Tortoise (Franklin Watts)
- 2025 The Helpful Pisky - Franklin Watts
- 2026 Mo and the Snow - Franklin Watts
- 2026 Ted's Band - Franklin Watts
- 2027 The Dragon Mask - Franklin Watts
- 2027 The New Chick - Franklin Watts
