= Prohor Račanin =

Prohor Račanin (Serbian Cyrillic: Прохор Рачанин; c. 1617 – 1678) was a monk-scribe and member of the School of Rača, a scriptorium in Bajina Bašta that was ransacked by the Turks. Most of the monks eventually moved from Serbia to Szentendre in Hungary under the leadership of Arsenije III Crnojević. Monk Prohor, however, left Rača monastery in Bajna Bašta long before the Great Serbian Migration and settled in Belgrade where he taught at a monastery there until he died in 1678. He left several unpublished manuscripts, now held in the archive of the Museum of the Serbian Orthodox Church.

== See also ==
- Jerotej Račanin
- Kiprijan Račanin
- Ćirjak Račanin
- Simeon Račanin
- Teodor Račanin
- Hristifor Račanin
- Grigorije Račanin
- Gavrilo Stefanović Venclović
