= Simon Rose (author) =

Canadian author

Simon Rose (born 1961) is a Canadian author of books for children and young adults, best known for his science fiction and fantasy novels.

== Biography ==
Rose, who was born February 23, 1961, in Chesterfield, Derbyshire, England), immigrated to Canada in 1990. He currently lives in Calgary, Alberta.

Rose works as an editor and writing coach and is a teacher of writing workshops. He teaches creative writing classes at Mount Royal University and the University of Calgary.

== Writing ==
Simon Rose's first novel for young readers, The Alchemist's Portrait, published in 2003, was nominated for the Golden Eagle Award. The Sorcerer's Letterbox, published in 2004, was also nominated for the Golden Eagle Award, along with the Silver Birch Award (Ontario Library Association) and Diamond Willow Award (Saskatchewan Young Readers' Choice Awards). His other novels are The Clone Conspiracy (2005), The Emerald Curse (2006), The Heretic's Tomb (2007), The Doomsday Mask (2009), The Time Camera (2011), The Sphere of Septimus (2014), Future Imperfect (2016), and An Untimely Death (2024). The three volume Flashback series includes Flashback (2015), Twisted Fate (2017), and Parallel Destiny (2018). He is also a contributing author to The Complete Guide to Writing Science Fiction, Volume One, (2007).

The three-volume series, Shadowzone, Into the Web and Black Dawn was published in 2017. The three volume series The Stone of the Seer, Royal Blood, and Revenge of the Witchfinder was published in 2022. The Order of Excalibur - The Ring of Fate, and The Order of Excalibur - Reich Britannia were published in 2025. The Memory Bank - All in the Mind, and The Memory Bank - Prisoners of the Prism were published in 2026.

Rose has written several guides for writers, including The Children's Writer's Guide and The Time Traveler's Guide. He has also written about 130 non-fiction books for educational publishers such as Weigl, Crabtree, Capstone, and Compass Point Books.

Rose has said that "I write for the boy I was at eight or nine and tend to lean toward subjects that interested me then -- science fiction, time travel, ancient mysteries, the unexplained, fantasy, history and comic books." He is known as a "prolific" author of books of "science fiction, fantasy, ancient mysteries and anything mysterious and unexplained" for children and young adults.
