= Teodor Račanin =

Serbian writer and Serbian Orthodox monk (1500-1560)

Teodor Račanin (Serbian Cyrillic: Теодор Рачанин; 1500 – 1560) was a writer and Serbian Orthodox monk of the Račan Scriptorium School mentioned in Ottoman sources of 16th century literature.

== Biography ==
Monk-scribe Teodor Račanin was given a mention in 1516 in Rača monastery and references to the place can be found in Turkish sources from 1528 to 1530. Before 1516 he was tonsured and began to study seriously his craft at the Rača monastery in Bajina Bašta where a renowned library and Scriptorium dating from the Middle Ages was still active. In the year 1560, seven monks lived in the monastery. Written records kept testifying to the existence of the holy place near Bajina Bašta throughout the 16th and 17th centuries, all until 1688 when the monastic church was "burnt in flames" by the invading Turks.

The Museum of the Serbian Orthodox Church is in possession of a small number of ornately decorated manuscripts by unknown scribes, though a few have been identified, namely Teodor Račanin (c. 1500-past 1560), Kiprijan Račanin, Grigorije Račanin, Maksim Račanin, Jerotej Račanin, Simeon Račanin, Hristifor Račanin, Ćirjak Račanin, Gavril Stefanović Venclović and others.

== See also ==
- Gavrilo Stefanović Venclović
- Ćirjak Račanin (1660–1731), Serbian Orthodox monk and writer
- Kiprijan Račanin (1650–1730), Serbian Orthodox monk and writer
- Jerotej Račanin (1650–1727), Serbian Orthodox monk and writer
- Simeon Račanin (fl. 1676–1700), Serbian Orthodox monk and writer
- Hristifor Račanin (1595–1670), Serbian Orthodox monk and writer
- Prohor Račanin, Serbian Orthodox monk
- Grigorije Račanin (fl. 1739), Serbian writer
- Jefrem Janković Tetovac

== Sources ==
- Skerlić, Jovan (1921). Istorija srpske književnosti. Beograd.
