= Jefrem Janković Tetovac =

Serbian-Russian bishop

Jefrem Janković (Serbian: Јефрем Јанковић, Russian: Ефрем Янкович; ca. 1640 – 18 March 1718), known as Jefrem Tetovac (Јефрем Тетовац; "of Tetovo"), was a Serbian and Russian Orthodox bishop, writer and bibliophile.

== Biography ==
Jefrem Janković was born in around 1640. His tombstone epitaph tells of him as being "a Serb [...] from the Serbian city of Skopje". As an archdeacon, he served at the Patriarchate of Peć under Patriarch Maksim I (s. 1655–1674). During the office of Patriarch Arsenije III (s. 1674–1690), Jefrem was ordained a priest. Janković was appointed the bishop of the Eparchy of Polog (otherwise known as Eparchy of Tetovo, hence his byname), an eparchy under jurisdiction of the Serbian Patriarchate of Peć.

During the Great Turkish War (1683–99), in the event known as the Great Serbian Migration, Janković and his countrymen feared Ottoman reprisal so they joined the Serbian Patriarch Arsenije III Crnojević and fled northwards into the Kingdom of Hungary, all the way to Szentendre, which the Patriarch made his new home. There, Jefrem was appointed in 1694 as the Orthodox bishop of Mohacs and Sziget, an important post because of the need to fight off aggressive Catholic propaganda. His seat was in the Orthodox monastery of Branjina.

Due to the pressure of the state to adopt union with Rome, Jefrem left for Russia in early 1703 as the Patriarch's envoy with an assignment to plead for help. His departure was much to the joy of the Viennese court that forbade him to come back. Since he could not return home from Russia, in 1708 he was ordained as the bishop of Suzdal and Yuryevo.

Jefrem was a man of many interests, most notably a bibliophile. He had a brother, Dimitrije, probably a monk, who visited him in 1709/1710 in Russia, bringing an Evangelion printed in the Kyiv Pecherska Lavra back to the Orahovica Monastery. He died in Russia, on 18 March 1718, and was buried at the church dedicated to the Birth of the Mother of God in Suzdal.

== See also ==
His contemporaries:

- Gavrilo Stefanović Venclović
- Ćirjak Račanin (1660–1731), Serbian Orthodox monk and writer
- Kiprijan Račanin (1650–1730), Serbian Orthodox monk and writer
- Prohor Račanin (c. 1617–1678)
- Grigorije Račanin (1668-after 1739)

== Sources ==
- Русский Провинциальный Некрополь. Moscow: I. N. Kushnerev. 1914. p. 294. ISBN 978-5-9989-7126-6.
- Grujić, Radoslav (1993). Азбучник Српске православне цркве. Belgrade. p. 96.
- Sava, Bishop of Šumadija (1996). Srpski jerarsi: od devetog do dvadesetog veka. Evro.
- Recueil de Vardar. Vol. 3. Belgrade: SANU. 2004. pp. 181, 422.
- Ефрем (Янкович) // Православная энциклопедия. — М., 2008. — Т. XIX : «Ефесянам послание — Зверев». — С. 67–69.
