= Perry T. Ryan =

American lawyer (born 1962)

Perry T. Ryan (born November 26, 1962) is an American lawyer who writes books on American history. Ryan has authored eight books. These include The Last Public Execution in America (1992), the story of Rainey Bethea, who was legally hanged in Owensboro, Kentucky in 1936. This book was featured on ABC's World News Tonight (Peter Jennings), on ABC's 20/20 (short note by Barbara Walters), on National Public Radio, and on the History Channel. In 1989, Ryan published Legal Lynching: The Plight of Sam Jennings, which chronicled a 1932 Kentucky hanging of a black man accused of the rape of a white woman. Ryan also wrote A Biography of Maurice F. O'Connell: The Story of An American Hero (1996), which celebrated the life of an American soldier of the 29th Infantry Division, who died during the liberation of France in World War II. This book was translated into French in 1998 and it has been used in the public schools of France to teach youngsters about the American contribution to the liberation of their country during the war. Ryan's other books include four genealogies and a church history. He utilizes an expository writing style designed for clarity.
