= Kiprijan Račanin =

Serbian writer and monk (1650-1730)

Kiprijan Račanin (Serbian Cyrillic: Кипријан Рачанин, Cyprian of Rača; c. 1650–1730) was a Serbian writer and monk who founded a copyist school (Scriptorium) in Szentendre, just like the one he left behind in Serbia -- School of Rača -- at the commencement of the Great Turkish War in 1689. He is remembered as an academically-trained Serbian-born writer and enlightener who laid the foundation for the development of modern Serbian literature, according to literary critic Jovan Skerlić.

It was, incidentally, in the small wooden church, dedicated to the Evangelist Luke, that the Szentenedre Scriptorium and printing office came into being; among the monk-scribes Kiprijan Račanin, Gavrilo Trojičanin, Jerotej Račanin, Čirjak Račanin, Hristifor Račanin, Teodor Račanin, and others.

Little is known about him. It is known, however, that he took orders at the Rača monastery and became a monk-scribe. During the Great Turkish War of 1689-1699 he left central Serbia for Serbian territories up north, bordering Hungary. In Zenta he remained for a while, joining the Christian fray against the Turks in the Battle of Zenta. With Arsenije III Čarnojević he came to settle in Szentendre, where he began to make a name for himself as the dean of a scriptorium, a diligent copyist of manuscripts and books, and writer of one of the early Serbian primers called Bukvar in 1717, an adaptation of a Primer by Russian writer Fedor Polikarpov-Orlov (1660-1731).

== Work ==
He compiled the Буквар словенских писмена ("Primer of Slavic Writings"; 1717), in which he gave the first rules of modern Serbian versification. Among the original works, the most significant is his inspired Стихира светом кнезу Лазару ("Stihira to the Holy Prince Lazarus"; 1692)

- Stichologion
- Liturgical writings

== See also ==
- Čirjak Račanin (1660–1731), Serbian Orthodox monk and writer
- Jerotej Račanin (1650–1727), Serbian Orthodox monk and writer
- Teodor Račanin (1500–1560), Serbian Orthodox monk and writer
- Simeon Račanin (fl. 1676–1700), Serbian Orthodox monk and writer
- Hristifor Račanin (1595–1670), Serbian Orthodox monk and writer
- Prohor Račanin, Serbian Orthodox monk
- Gavrilo Stefanović Venclović
- Grigorije Račanin (fl. 1739), Serbian writer
- Jefrem Janković Tetovac

== Sources ==
- Skerlić, Jovan (1921). Istorija srpske književnosti. Beograd.
- Translated and adapted from Serbian Wikipedia:https://sr.wikipedia.org/wiki/%D0%9A%D0%B8%D0%BF%D1%80%D0%B8%D1%98%D0%B0%D0%BD_%D0%A0%D0%B0%D1%87%D0%B0%D0%BD%D0%B8%D0%BD
