= Jerotej Račanin =

Serbian writer (1625-1727)

Jerotej Račanin (Serbian Cyrillic: Јеротеј Рачанин; c. 1650 – after 1727) was a Serbian writer and transcriber of church manuscripts and books. After visiting Jerusalem in 1704, he wrote a book about his travel experiences from Hungary to the Holy Land and back.

== Biography ==
At the time of the Great Turkish War in the last quarter of the seventeenth century, the Rača monastery was devastated. The Turks several times carried out reprisals against the monks of Rača for engaging in educational activities and promoting Serbian culture, copying church manuscripts and books. Eventually, the monks were forced to take their manuscripts and books with them and, with Arsenije III Čarnojević, join in the Christian forces in northern Serbia at Zenta, and settle in the uninhabited regions bordering Hungary and deeper inland. They moved to the new regions and resumed their work at Szentendre, near Budapest, and assumed as their surname the name of their former monastery. Among the several who distinguished themselves as monk-scribes and illuminators of old manuscripts were Jerotej Račanin, Hristifor Račanin, Kiprijan Račanin, Gavril Stefanović Venclović, Simeon Račanin, Čirjak Račanin, Teodor Račanin, Prohor Račanin, Grigorije Račanin, Jefrem Janković Tetovac, and many others.

From Szentendre, Jerotej Račanin settled at Velika Remeta, a cultural center of the Serbs in the 16th and the 17th centuries, and the home of a manuscript and book copying and illuminating school. Here, Jerotej, who lived in this monastery in 1721, wrote "A Journey to Jerusalem", the first travel book in modern Serbian literature.

During the last years of the seventeenth century, Jerotej Račanin first settled in Dunaföldvár, a town in Tolna County, Hungary, with a mixed population of Hungarians and Serbs at the time. From Dunaföldvár, situated on the right bank of the Danube, Jerotej moved to Srem, at the start of the eighteenth century. From then on, he began his literary activity by working as a scribe. It was there that he became motivated by his transcript of a travelogue from 1698 written by Lavrentije, an abbot of the Serbian Hilandar Monastery, who travelled to Jerusalem in the third decade of the seventeenth century. Perhaps he was also influenced by the numerous pilgrimage works and records belonging to the genre of proskynetaria, and the work of the 'sinful priest Toma' from 1642-1643. On 7 July 1704, Jerotej set out on a pilgrimage to the Holy Land like many Serbian, Russian, and Bulgarian monks and secular people had done before him. Jerotej arrived in Jerusalem on 8 January 1705. After four months visiting the Holy places, he left Jerusalem on 17 April 1705. It took him another four months to return home to Belgrade on 23 July 1705.

In the Middle Ages, no European dynasty had such a strong connection with Jerusalem and the Holy Land as the Nemanjići and Saint Sava. The number of pilgrimage works and records composed during the 10 centuries continues to increase. Some of these works are lavishly decorated, like the travelogue of Gavrilo Tadić, who visited the Holy Places in 1661, containing 34 colour miniatures depicting the most important temples.

== See also ==
- Gavrilo Stefanović Venclović
- Čirjak Račanin (1660–1731), Serbian Orthodox monk and writer
- Kiprijan Račanin (1650–1730), Serbian Orthodox monk and writer
- Teodor Račanin (1500–1560), Serbian Orthodox monk and writer
- Simeon Račanin (fl. 1676–1700), Serbian Orthodox monk and writer
- Hristifor Račanin (1595–1670), Serbian Orthodox monk and writer
- Prohor Račanin, Serbian Orthodox monk
- Grigorije Račanin (fl. 1739), Serbian writer
- Maksim Račanin
- Lavrentije Račanin
- Jefrem Janković Tetovac

== Sources ==
- Translated and adapted from Jovan Skerlić's Istorija nove srpske književnosti (Belgrade, 1914, 1921), pages 27–28
