= Jorge B. Rivera =

Jorge B. Rivera (1935–2004) was an Argentine poet, essayist, critic, journalist and researcher on issues of history and popular culture. He was born in Buenos Aires in 1935 and died on August 27, 2004. He is considered a pioneer in research in mass communication in Argentina.

== Career ==
B. Rivera's work contains more than twenty books and countless articles and forewords and spans the fields of literature, journalism, theatre and tango. He was one of the first Argentine academians to systematically examine what were considered minor genres, such as melodrama, comic strip, police and gaucho literatures. He created the professorship in the History of media and communication systems at the Faculty of Social Sciences at the University of Buenos Aires and was director of the Communication Sciences course at the same institution.

== Works ==
- Beneficio de inventario (1963) - Benefits of inventory.
- La primitiva literatura gauchesca (1968) - The primitive gaucho literature.
- El folletín y la novela popular (1968) - Melodrama and the popular novel.
- Los bohemios (1971) - The Bohemians.
- El general Juan Facundo Quiroga (1974) - General Juan Facundo Quiroga.
- Madí y la vanguardia argentina (1976) - Madi and the Argentine vanguard.
- La historia del tango: sus orígenes (with José Gobello and Blas Matamoro, 1976) - The history of tango: its origins.
- Poesía gauchesca (1977) - Gaucho Poetry.
- Asesinos de papel. Ensayos sobre narrativa policial (with Jorge Lafforgue, 1977) - Murderers on paper. Essays on police Fiction.
- Medios de comunicación y cultura popular (with Eduardo Romano and Aníbal Ford, 1985) - The media and popular culture.
- Roberto Arlt: los siete locos (1986) - Roberto Arlt: The Seven Crazy Ones.
- El relato policial en la Argentina: Antología crítica (1986) - The detective story in Argentina: Critical Anthology.
- La investigación en comunicación social en la Argentina (1986) - Social communication research in Argentina.
- Claves del periodismo argentino actual (with Eduardo Romano, 1987) - Keys to current Argentine journalism.
- El cuento popular (1987) - The folk tale.
- Panorama de la historieta en la Argentina (1992) - Overview of the cartoon in Argentina.
- Postales electrónicas: ensayos sobre medios, cultura y sociedad (1994) - Electronic postcards: essays on media, culture and society.
- El periodismo cultural (1995) - Cultural journalism.
- Comunicación, medios y cultura : líneas de investigación en la Argentina: 1986-1996 (1997) - Communication, media and culture: lines of research in Argentina.
- El escritor y la industria cultural (1998) - The writer and the culture industry.
- Territorio Borges y otros ensayos breves (2000) - Borges Territory and other short essays.

=== Articles ===
- Interview with Fermín Chávez (1975). Published in the Crisis newspaper in May 1975
- La bohemia literaria. La inserción en el periodismo (Initiation into journalism) (1981)
- Denis Diderot (1982)
- Las claves del sistema solar (1985) (Keys to the solar system)
- La máquina de capturar fantasmas (1985) (The machine for capturing ghosts)
- El lunfardo rioplatense (1992) (The Rioplatense slang)
- Roberto Arlt: el problema de la corrección (1992) (Roberto Arlt: The Problem of Correction)
- La Patafísica en el Plata (1999) (Pataphysics, the science of imaginary solutions)
