= Rača Monastery =

13th-century monastery in Serbia

Coordinates: 43°55′53″N 19°32′26″E

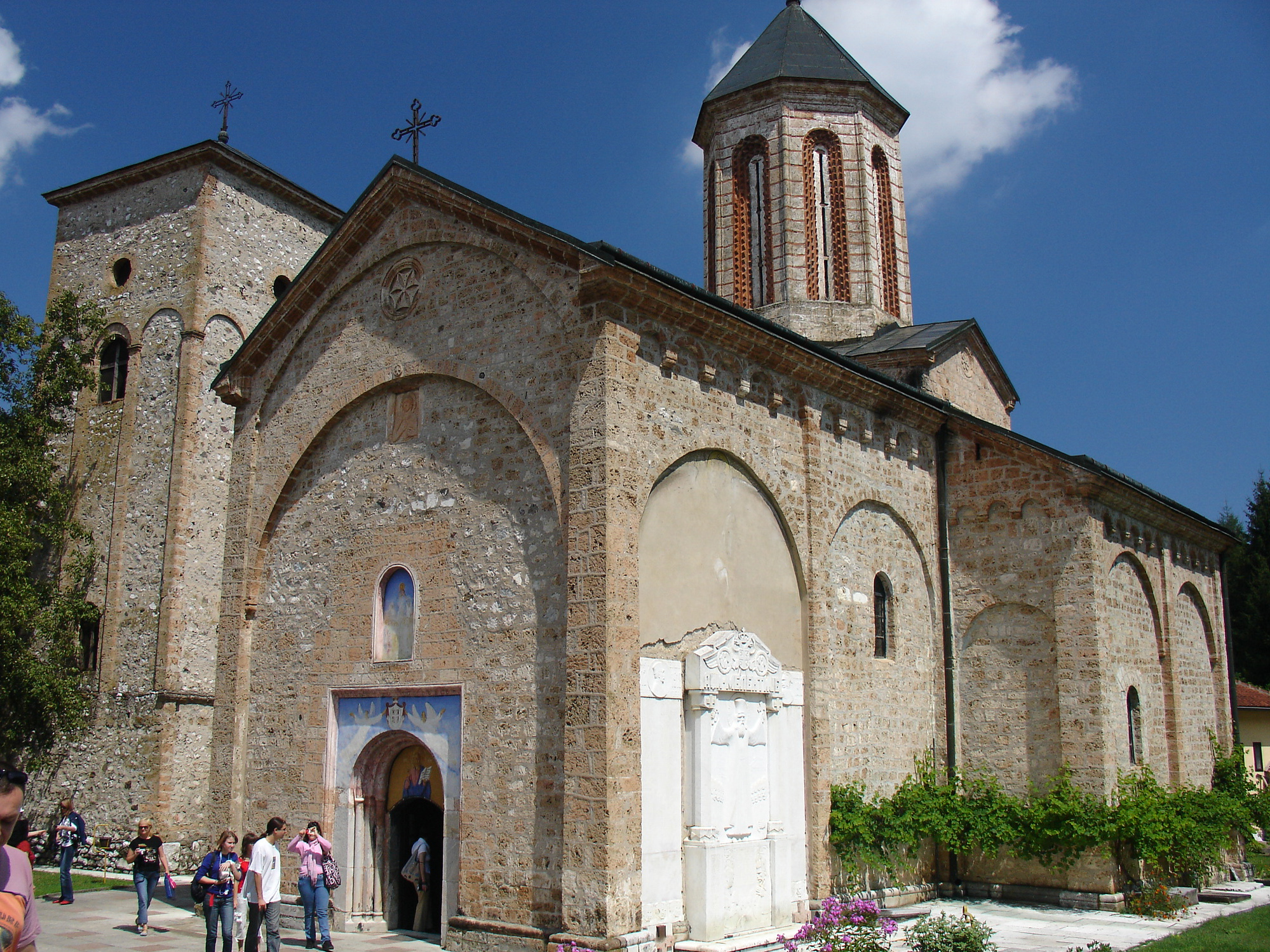
- The Monastery
- Interactive map of Rača Monastery

Monastery information
- Full name: Манастир Рача; Manastir Rača
- Order: Serbian Orthodox
- Established: 1276–1282
- Diocese: Eparchy of Žiča

People
- Founder: Stefan Dragutin

Site
- Location: Bajina Bašta

The Rača Monastery (Serbian: манастир Рача / manastir Rača) is a Serbian Orthodox monastery 7 km south of Bajina Bašta, Serbia. The monastery was built by Stefan Dragutin (1276–1282). The monastery became a place where Serbian rulers, nobles, and church dignitaries were buried. The monks translated texts from Ancient Greek, wrote histories, and copied manuscripts (the most famous scriptorium was in Rača, known as the Rača School (Serbian: Рачанска школа / Račanska škola), which flourished from the sixteenth to the eighteenth century); they translated and copied not only liturgical but scientific and literary works of the period.

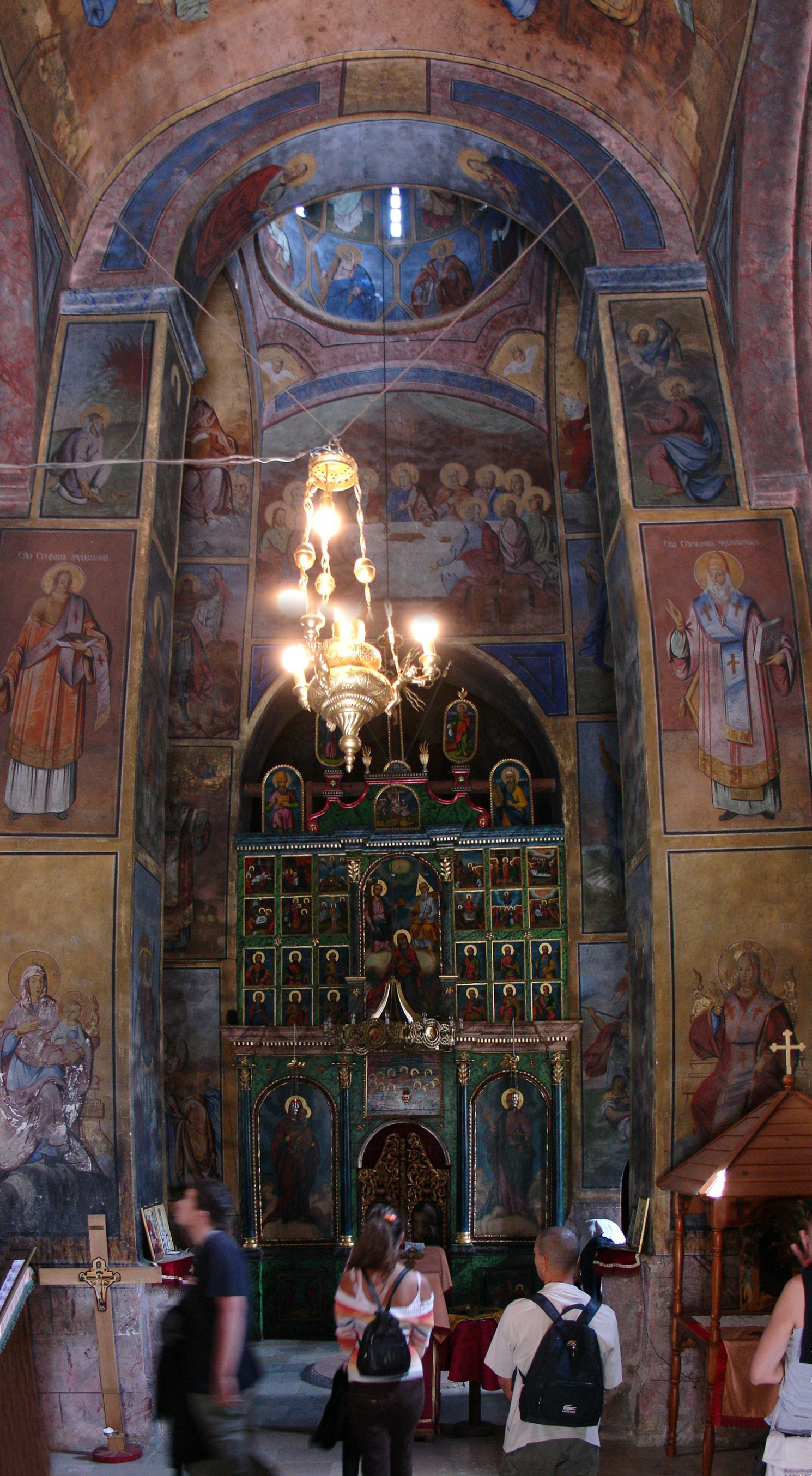
Interior

History of Serbian literature owes most of its creativity to the Rača School and its alumni, Kiprijan, Jerotej, Čirjak, Simeon, Teodor, Hristifor, Gavrilo Stefanović Venclović, etc. As with the monks of Rača, it is not uncommon for anonymous writers to be referred to by their first name and the name of the place associated with their life or work.

Turkish travel writer dervish Zulih, also known as Evliya Çelebi, noted in his travelogue of 1630 that in Rača Monastery there were 300 monk-scribes, who were served by 400 shepherds, blacksmiths, and other staff. The security guard detail included 200 armed men.

During the Great Turkish War in 1689, the monastery was partially destroyed by the invading Turks. In 1826, it was reconstructed after being burned down several times while Serbia was under the rule of the Ottoman Empire.
