= Gavrilo Stefanović Venclović =

Serbian theologian and writer (1680–1749)

- Born: c. 1680; Srem, Habsburg monarchy
- Died: c. 1749; Szentendre, Habsburg Monarchy
- Occupations: Writer, poet, philosopher, theologian
- Writing career
- Literary movement: Baroque

Gavrilo "Gavril" Stefanović Venclović (Serbian Cyrillic: Гаврилo Стефановић Венцловић; fl. 1680–1749) was a priest, writer, poet, orator, philosopher, neologist, polyglot, and illuminator. He was one of the first and most notable representatives of Serbian Baroque literature.

Venclović's most important contributions as a scholar was in the development of the vernacular in what would a century later become the Serbian literary language. He is also remembered as one of the first Serbian enlighteners, student of Kiprijan Račanin.

== Biography ==
Venclović was born to a Serbian family in Srem province, then part of the Hungarian kingdom. Little information about him is known. From the evidence he gave in his writings in 1735 it is known that he was then a senior citizen. He adopted the town of Szentendre as his home. He became a disciple of Kiprijan Račanin.

The first Rača School in Srem was in the Monastery of St. Lucas. Venclović had acquired skills as a poet and icon painter. He also wrote and collected songs, and wrote Hagiography of Serbian saints. Archival records show that Venclović attended the Kyiv Mohyla Academy (now National University of Kyiv-Mohyla Academy) from 1711 to 1715. He then went to Győr, a city in northwest Hungary, where he became a parish priest at the Serbian Orthodox Church of St. Nicholas.

He preached to the Orthodox Šajkaši and the Slavonian Military Frontier troops in 1746. He was loyal to the Habsburg monarch, and demanded others be loyal to the ruling family, and that they show respect for the military code (as inseparable from dynastic patriotism). Venclović appealed to the Šajkaši and soldiers alike to be devoted to the emperor, to refrain from abusing the weak, stealing, and betraying their comrades and fellow men-at-arms.

== Literary work ==
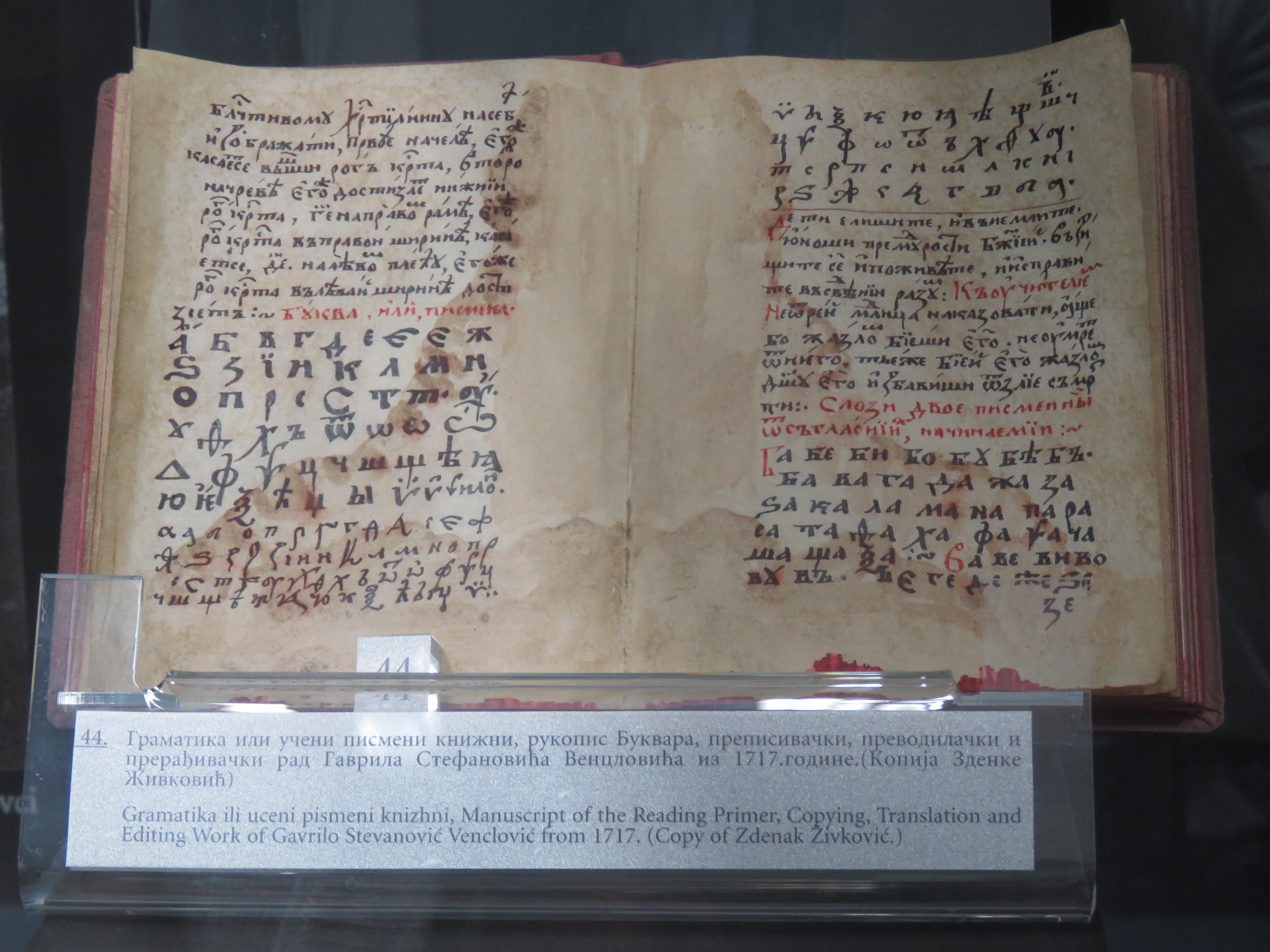
Venclović's grammar from 1717

At the beginning of the 18th century, Venclović translated some 20,000 pages of old biblical literature into vernacular Serbian.

Venclović's opus was vast, consisting of orations, biographies, church songs, poems, illuminations and illustrations of church books. His language was full of vernacular vitality yet able to express the inner, the subtle, and the transcendent. He was familiar with the works of contemporary Russian and Polish theologians. From Russian, he translated archbishop Lazar Baranovych's Mech Dukhovny (The Spiritual Sword), and from Polish, he translated Istorija Barona Cezara, kardinala rimskago.

Gavrilo Stefanović Venclović was among the first to use Serbian vernacular as a standard language for the purpose of writing sermons.

The sway of Old Church Slavonic as the medieval literary language of all the Eastern Orthodox Slavs lasted many centuries. In Russia, it was obtained until the time of Peter the Great (1672–1725), and among the Serbs until the time of Venclović. He translated the bible from Old Slavonic to Old Serbian. Thus the Old Slavonic was relegated only to liturgical purposes. From then on, theology and church oratory and administration were carried on in Slavoserbian, a mixture of Old Slavic (Old Church Slavonic) in its Russian form with a popular Serbian rendering, until Vuk Karadžić, who was the first reformer to shake off the remnants of this ancient speech and to institute a phonetic orthography.

== Selected works ==
- Slova izbrana
- Udvorenje arhanđela Gavrila Devici Mariji
- Šajkaši orations
- The Spiritual Sword
- Prayers Against Bloody Waters

== See also ==
- Čirjak Račanin (1660–1731), Serbian Orthodox monk and writer
- Kiprijan Račanin (1650–1730), Serbian Orthodox monk and writer
- Jerotej Račanin (1650–1727), Serbian Orthodox monk and writer
- Teodor Račanin (1500–1560), Serbian Orthodox monk and writer
- Simeon Račanin (fl. 1676–1700), Serbian Orthodox monk and writer
- Hristifor Račanin (1595–1670), Serbian Orthodox monk and writer
- Prohor Račanin (c. 1617-1678), Serbian Orthodox monk and writer
- Grigorije Račanin (1668-after 1739), Serbian Orthodox monk and writer
