= List of German-language authors =

This list contains the names of persons (of any ethnicity or nationality) who wrote fiction, essays, or plays in the German language. It includes both living and deceased writers.

Most of the medieval authors are alphabetized by their first name, not by their sobriquet.

Abbreviations: children's (ch), drama (d), fiction (f), non-fiction (nf), poetry (p)

== A ==
- Thomas Abbt (1738–1766, nf)
- Johann Christoph Adelung (1732–1806, nf)
- Konrad Adenauer (1876–1967, nf)
- Mario Adorf (1930–2026, f/nf)
- Theodor W. Adorno (1903–1969, nf)
- Rudolf Agricola (1494–1566, nf)
- Ilse Aichinger (1921–2016, p/f/d)
- Hermann Allmers (1821–1902, p)
- Peter Altenberg (1859–1919, nf/p)
- Gerhard Amendt (born 1939, nf)
- Carl Amery (1922–2005, f/nf)
- Jean Améry (1912–1978, nf/f)
- Günther Anders (1902–1992, nf/f/p)
- Alfred Andersch (1914–1980, f/nf)
- Lou Andreas-Salomé (1861–1937, nf)
- Stefan Andres (1906–1970, f)
- Ernst Angel (1895–1986, p/nf/d)
- Angelus Silesius, pseudonym of Johann Scheffler (1624–1677, p)
- Ludwig Anzengruber (1839–1889, d/f/p)
- Johann August Apel (1771–1816, f)
- Ernst Moritz Arndt (1769–1860, nf/p)
- Achim von Arnim (1781–1831, p/f)
- Bettina von Arnim (1785–1859, nf/f)
- Gottfried Arnold (1666–1714, nf)
- Jean Arp (1887–1966, p)
- Hans Carl Artmann (1921–2000, f/nf/p)
- Raoul Auernheimer (1876–1948, nf)
- Rose Ausländer (1901–1988, p)

== B ==
- Ottilie Bach (1836–1905, f)
- Ingeborg Bachmann (1926–1973, p/d)
- Lothar Baier (1942–2004, f/nf)
- Amalie Baisch (1859–1904)
- Hugo Ball (1886–1927, p)
- Zsuzsa Bánk (born 1965, f)
- Janos Bardi (1923–1990, f/nf)
- Ernst Barlach (1870–1938, nf)
- Adolf Bartels (1862–1945, nf/p/d)
- Johann Bernhard Basedow (1723–1790, nf/ch)
- Wilhelm Bauberger (1809–1883, f)
- Wolfgang Bauer (1941–2005, d/p/f/nf)
- Vicki Baum (1888–1960, f)
- Konrad Bayer (1932–1964, d/f/p)
- Johannes R. Becher (1891–1958, f/p)
- Jurek Becker (1937–1997, f)
- Jürgen Becker (1932–2024, p/f)
- Michael Beheim (1416 – c. 1474, p)
- Albrecht Behmel (born 1971, f/nf/d)
- Maria Beig (1920–2018, f)
- Hans Bender (1907–1991, nf)
- Walter Benjamin (1892–1940, nf)
- Gottfried Benn (1886–1956, p/nf)
- Sibylle Berg (born 1962, f/d/nf/p)
- Werner Bergengruen (1892–1964, f/p)
- Ulla Berkéwicz (born 1948, f/nf/d)
- Thomas Bernhard (1931–1989, f/d/p)
- August Ferdinand Bernhardi (1769–1820, nf)
- Stefan Beuse (born 1967, nf)
- Marcel Beyer (born 1965, p/f/nf)
- Peter Bichsel (1935–2025, nf/p)
- Jakob Bidermann (1578–1639, d/nf)
- Horst Bienek (1930–1990, f/nf/p)
- Wolf Biermann (born 1936, p)
- Maxim Biller (born 1960, f/nf/d/ch)
- Silvio Blatter (born 1946, f/nf)
- Ernst Bloch (1885–1977, nf)
- Johannes Bobrowski (1917–1965, p/f)
- Manfred Böckl (1948–2026, f/nf)
- Johann Jakob Bodmer (1698–1783, nf)
- Jakob Böhme (1575–1624, nf)
- Margarete Böhme (1867–1939, f)
- Heinrich Böll (1917–1985, f)
- Wolfgang Borchert (1921–1947, d/p/f)
- Nicolai Borger (born 1974, d/p)
- Nicolas Born (1937–1979, p/f)
- Ludwig Börne (1786–1837, nf)
- Nora Bossong (born 1982, p/f/nf)
- Bas Böttcher (born 1974, p)
- Adolf Brand (1874–1945, nf)
- Mark Brandis (1931–2000, f)
- Alois Brandstetter (born 1938, f/nf)
- Matthias Brandt (born 1961, f/nf)
- Willy Brandt (1913–1992, nf)
- Sebastian Brant (1457–1521, nf)
- Axel Brauns (born 1963, nf/f)
- Bertolt Brecht (1898–1956, d/p)
- Willi Bredel (1901–1964, f/nf)
- Joseph Breitbach (1903–1980, f/d/nf)
- Bernard von Brentano (1901–1964, p/d/f/nf)
- Clemens Brentano (1778–1842, p/f)
- Franz Brentano (1838–1917, nf)
- Rolf Dieter Brinkmann (1940–1975, p/f/nf)
- Hermann Broch (1886–1951, f/nf/p)
- Barthold Heinrich Brockes (1680–1747, p)
- Max Brod (1884–1968, f/nf)
- Henryk M. Broder (born 1946, nf/f)
- Alina Bronsky (born 1978, f/ch)
- Günter de Bruyn (1926–2020, f/nf)
- Martin Buber (1878–1965, nf)
- Georg Büchner (1813–1837, d/p/nf)
- Frieda von Bülow (1857–1909, f/nf)
- Margarethe von Bülow (1860–1884, f)
- Hermann Burger (1942–1989, p/f/nf)
- Gottfried August Bürger (1747–1794, p)
- Christine Busta, pseudonym of Christine Dimt (1915–1987, p)

== C ==
- Joachim Heinrich Campe (1746–1818, nf)
- Elias Canetti (1905–1994, f/d/nf)
- Erwin Carlé (1876–1923, nf)
- Hans Carossa (1878–1956, f/p)
- Ignaz Franz Castelli, pseudonym Bruder Fatalis (1781–1862, d/p)
- Elisabeth Castonier (1894–1975, nf/ch)
- Paul Celan, pseudonym of Paul Antschel (1920–1970, p)
- Conrad Celtis (1459–1508, nf/p)
- C. W. Ceram, pseudonym of Kurt W. Marek (1915–1972, nf)
- Adelbert von Chamisso (1781–1838, p/nf)
- Peter O. Chotjewitz (1934–2010, f/nf/p)
- Lena Christ (1881–1920, f/nf)
- Helene Christaller (1872–1953, f/ch)
- Hanns Cibulka (1920–2004, p/nf)
- Oscar Walter Cisek (1897–1966, f/p/nf)
- Matthias Claudius (1740–1815, p/nf)
- Heinrich Joseph von Collin (1772–1811, d)
- Alexandra Cordes (1935–1986, f)
- Hedwig Courths-Mahler (1867–1950, f)
- Wolf-Ulrich Cropp (born 1941, nf/f)
- Alfons von Czibulka (1888–1969, f/nf)
- Max Czollek (born 1987, p/nf)

== D ==
- Simon Dach (1605–1659, p)
- Felix Dahn (1834–1912, nf/p)
- Erich von Däniken (1935–2026, nf)
- Jason Dark (born 1945, f)
- Clark Darlton (1920–2005, f), pseudonym of Walter Ernsting
- Dietmar Dath (born 1970, p/d/f/nf)
- Max Dauthendey (1867–1918, nf)
- Henriette Davidis (1801–1876, nf)
- Franz Josef Degenhardt (1931–2011, p/f)
- Richard Dehmel (1863–1920, p/nf)
- F. C. Delius (1943–2022, p/f/nf)
- Michael Denis (1729–1800, p/nf)
- Lorenz Diefenbach (1806–1883, nf)
- Dietmar von Aist (1140–1171, p)
- Wilhelm Dilthey (1833–1911, nf)
- Franz von Dingelstedt (1814–1881, p/d)
- Artur Dinter (1876–1948, nf)
- Hugo Dittberner (born 1944, p/f/nf)
- Alfred Döblin (1878–1957, f/nf)
- Heimito von Doderer (1896–1966, p/f)
- Hilde Domin, pseudonym of Hilde Palm (1909–2006, p/nf)
- Hans Dominik (1872–1945, f/nf)
- Thea Dorn (born 1970, d/f)
- Marion Dönhoff (1909–2002, nf)
- Doris Dörrie (born 1955, f)
- Tankred Dorst (1925–2017, d)
- Albert Drach (1902–1995, f/d)
- Ulrike Draesner (born 1962, p/f)
- Annette von Droste-Hülshoff (1797–1848, p/f)
- Wiglaf Droste (1961–2019, p/f/nf)
- Slatan Dudow (1903–1963, d)
- Friedrich Dürrenmatt (1921–1990, d/f/nf)
- Karen Duve (born 1961, f/nf)

== E ==
- Johann Eberlin von Günzburg (c. 1470–1533, nf)
- Georg Ebers (1837–1898, nf/f)
- Karl Egon Ebert (1801–1882, p)
- Marie von Ebner-Eschenbach (1830–1916, f)
- Dietrich Eckart (1868–1923, p/d/nf)
- Johann Peter Eckermann (1792–1854, p/nf)
- Meister Eckhart (c. 1260 – c. 1328, nf)
- Ernst Eckstein (1845–1900, f/nf/p)
- Wiebke Eden (born 1968, nf/f)
- Werner Eggerath (1900–1977, nf)
- Werner Egk (1901–1983, d/nf)
- Albert Ehrenstein (1886–1950, p/nf)
- Günter Eich (1907–1972, p/d)
- Joseph Freiherr von Eichendorff (1788–1857, p/f/d)
- Ludwig Eichrodt (1827–1892, p/d)
- Carl Einstein (1885–1940, nf)
- Siegfried Einstein (1919–1983, p/f/nf)
- Dorothee Elmiger (born 1985, f/nf)
- Carolin Emcke (born 1967, nf)
- Michael Ende (1929–1995, f/ch)
- Johann Jakob Engel (1741–1802, d/nf)
- Friedrich Engels (1820–1895, nf)
- Hans Magnus Enzensberger (1929–2022, p/nf)
- Mutlu Ergün (born 1978, nf)
- Gustav Ernst (born 1944, d/f)
- Paul Ernst (1866–1933, f/d/nf)
- Andreas Eschbach (born 1959, f)
- Ernst Wilhelm Eschmann (1904–1987, nf/d)
- Richard Euringer (1891–1953, f/nf)
- Hanns Heinz Ewers (1871–1943, p/nf/f)

== F ==
- Ludwig Fahrenkrog (1867–1952, nf)
- Johannes Daniel Falk (1768–1826, p)
- Hans Fallada, pseudonym of Rudolf Ditzen (1893–1947, f/nf)
- Rainer Werner Fassbinder (1945–1982, d/nf)
- Sherko Fatah (born 1964, f)
- Jörg Fauser (1944–1987, f/nf/p)
- Gustav Theodor Fechner, pseudonym Dr. Mises (1801–1887, nf)
- Hans-Jorg Fecht (born 1957, nf)
- Else Feldmann (1884–1942, f/d/poet), Holocaust victim
- Kurt Feltz, pseudonym Johnny Bartels (1910–1982, p)
- Lion Feuchtwanger (1884–1958, f/d)
- Ludwig Feuerbach (1804–1872, nf)
- Renate Feyl (born 1944, f/nf)
- Johannes Fiebag (1956–1999, nf)
- Johann Fischart (1546–1590, nf)
- Sebastian Fitzek (born 1971, f/nf)
- Konrad Fleck (13th c., p)
- Marieluise Fleißer, pseudonym of Marieluise Haindl (1901–1974, d/f/nf)
- Paul Fleming (1609–1640, p)
- Walter Flex (1887–1917, f/nf)
- Gorch Fock, pseudonyms Jakob Holst and Giorgio Focco (1880–1916, f/d/p)
- Hans Folz (c. 1437–1513, nf/f)
- Theodor Fontane (1819–1898, nf/f)
- Friedrich de la Motte Fouqué (1777–1843, f/d)
- Hans Franck, pseudonym of Hans Lützelburger (1879–1964, f)
- Julia Franck (born 1970, f/nf)
- Sebastian Franck (1499 – c. 1543, nf)
- Bruno Frank (1887–1945, p/d)
- Leonhard Frank (1882–1961, f/d)
- Ludwig August Frankl von Hochwart (1810–1894, p)
- Franzobel, pseudonym of Franz Stefan Griebl (born 1967, f)
- Karl Emil Franzos (1848–1904, f)
- Frauenlob, pseudonym of Heinrich von Meißen (1250/1260–1318, p)
- Ferdinand Freiligrath (1810–1876, p/nf)
- Gustav Frenssen (1863–1945, f)
- Sigmund Freud (1856–1939, nf)
- Gustav Freytag (1816–1895, f/d)
- Alfred Hermann Fried (1864–1921, nf)
- Erich Fried (1921–1988, p/d/f)
- Johannes Fried (1942–2026, nf)
- Egon Friedell, pseudonym of Egon Friedmann (1878–1938, nf/d/f)
- Max Frisch (1911–1991, d/f/nf)
- Abraham Emanuel Fröhlich (1796–1865, p/nf)
- Erich Fromm (1900–1980, nf)
- Ludwig Fulda, pseudonym of Ludwig Anton Salomon (1862–1939, d/f/ch)
- Cornelia Funke (born 1958, ch)

== G ==
- Hans-Georg Gadamer (1900–2002, nf)
- Philipp Galen, pseudonym of Philipp Lange (1813–1899, f)
- Ludwig Ganghofer (1855–1920, f)
- Peter Gast (1854–1918, nf)
- Emanuel Geibel (1815–1884, p/d)
- Arno Geiger (born 1968, f)
- Heike Geißler (born 1977, f)
- Christian Fürchtegott Gellert (1715–1769, p)
- Wilhelm Genazino (1943–2018, f/d)
- Stefan George (1868–1933, p)
- Paul Gerhardt (1602–1676, nf/p)
- Robert Gernhardt (1937–2006, nf/p)
- Friedrich Gerstäcker (1816–1872, f/nf)
- Heinrich Wilhelm von Gerstenberg (1737–1823, p/nf)
- Kerstin Gier (born 1966, f/ch)
- Johannes Gilhoff (1861–1930, nf)
- Franz Karl Ginzkey (1871–1963, p/ch)
- Johann Rudolph Glauber (1604–1670, nf)
- Friedrich Glauser (1896–1938, f)
- Johann Wilhelm Ludwig Gleim (1719–1803, p)
- Albrecht Goes (1908–2000, p/nf)
- Johann Wolfgang von Goethe (1749–1832, p/d/f)
- Rainald Goetz (born 1954, f/d/nf)
- Melchior Goldast (1578–1635, nf)
- Georges-Arthur Goldschmidt (born 1928, f/nf)
- Claire Goll (1891–1977, p/f)
- Yvan Goll (1891–1950, p)
- Bogumil Goltz (1801–1870, nf)
- Friedrich Wilhelm Gotter (1746–1797, p/d)
- Gottfried von Straßburg (died c. 1210, p/d)
- Jeremias Gotthelf, pseudonym of Albert Bitzius (1797–1854, f)
- Johann Christoph Gottsched (1700–1766, nf)
- Johann Nikolaus Götz (1721–1781, p)
- Christian Dietrich Grabbe (1801–1836, d)
- Oskar Maria Graf (1894–1967, nf)
- Günter Grass (1927–2015, f/p/d)
- Ferdinand Gregorovius (1821–1891, nf)
- Felix Paul Greve (1879–1948, f)
- Friedrich Griese (1890–1975, f/nf)
- Franz Grillparzer (1791–1872, d/p)
- Jacob Grimm (1785–1863, nf/ch)
- Wilhelm Grimm (1786–1859, nf/ch)
- Matthias T. J. Grimme (born 1953, nf)
- Hans Jakob Christoffel von Grimmelshausen (1621–1676, f)
- Georg Groddeck (1866–1934, nf/f)
- Hans Gross (1893–1981, nf)
- Alfred Grosser (1925–2024, nf)
- Klaus Groth (1819–1899, p/f)
- Anastasius Grün, pseudonym of Anton Alexander Graf von Auersperg (1806–1876, p)
- Max von der Grün (1926–2005, f/nf/p/d/ch)
- Durs Grünbein (born 1962, p/nf)
- Andreas Gryphius (1616–1664, p/d)
- Martin Grzimek (born 1950, f)
- Anton-Andreas Guha (1937–2010, nf)
- Martin Gumpert (1897–1955, nf)
- Friedrich Gundolf (1880–1931, nf/p)
- Johann Christian Günther (1659–1723, p)
- Albert Paris Gütersloh, pseudonym of Albert Conrad Kiehtreiber (1887–1973, nf)
- Karl Gutzkow (1811–1878, nf/f/d)

== H ==
- Jürgen Habermas (1929–2026, nf)
- Erich Hackl (born 1954, f)
- Friedrich Wilhelm Hackländer (1816–1877, f)
- Peter Hacks (1928–2003, d/nf)
- Gabriele Haefs (born 1953, nf)
- Gisbert Haefs (born 1950, f)
- Ernst Haffner (20th century, f)
- Sebastian Haffner (1907–1999, nf)
- Volker Hage (1949–2026, f/nf)
- Friedrich von Hagedorn (1708–1754, p)
- Albrecht von Haller (1708–1777, nf/p)
- Friedrich Halm, pseudonym of Eligius von Münch-Bellinghausen (1806–1871, d/p/f)
- Johann Georg Hamann (1730–1788, nf)
- Joseph von Hammer-Purgstall (1774–1856, nf)
- Peter Handke (born 1942, f/d/p)
- Ferdinand Hanusch (1866–1923, f/nf)
- Eberhard Werner Happel (1647–1690, nf/f)
- Thea von Harbou (1888–1954, d/f)
- Ernst Hardt, pseudonym of Ernst Stöckhardt (1876–1947, d/p/f)
- Georg Philipp Harsdörffer (1607–1658, p)
- Otto Erich Hartleben (1864–1905, p/d)
- Peter Härtling (1933–2017, p/f/nf)
- Moritz Hartmann (1821–1872, p/f)
- Petra Hartmann (born 1970, f/nf)
- Hartmann von Aue (c. 1170 – c. 1220, p)
- Walter Hasenclever (1890–1940, p/d)
- Wilhelm Hasenclever (1837–1889, nf/f/p)
- Wilhelm Hauff (1802–1827, p/f)
- Gerhart Hauptmann (1862–1946, d/f)
- Otto Hauser (1876–1944, nf)
- Albrecht Haushofer (1903–1945, p/d/nf)
- Marlen Haushofer (1920–1970, f/ch)
- Raoul Hausmann (1886–1971, p)
- Adolf Hausrath, pseudonym George Taylor (1837–1909, nf/f)
- Gyula Háy (1900–1975, nf/d)
- Friedrich Hebbel (1813–1863, p/d)
- Johann Peter Hebel (1760–1826, f/p/nf)
- Friedrich Heer (1916–1983, nf)
- Georg Wilhelm Friedrich Hegel (1770–1831, nf)
- Martin Heidegger (1889–1976, nf)
- Heinrich Heine (1797–1856, p/nf)
- Helme Heine (1941–2025, ch)
- Willi Heinrich (1920–2005, f)
- Heinrich von Morungen (c. 1200–1222, p)
- Heinrich von Veldeke (c. 1150–1190/1200, p)
- Helmut Heißenbüttel (1921–1996, f/p)
- Kurt Held, pseudonym of Kurt Kläber (1897–1959, f/ch)
- Ulrike Henschke (1830–1897, nf)
- Luise Hensel (1798–1876, p/nf)
- Wilhelm Herchenbach (1818–1889, ch)
- Karoline Herder (1750–1809, nf)
- Johann Gottfried Herder (1744–1803, p/nf)
- Judith Hermann (born 1970, f)
- Stephan Hermlin (1915–1997, f/nf/p)
- Franz Herre (1926–2026, nf)
- Wolfgang Herrndorf (1965–2013, f/nf)
- Georg Herwegh (1817–1875, p)
- Theodor Herzl (1860–1904, d/nf)
- Wilhelm Herzog (1884–1960, nf/d)
- Hermann Hesse (1877–1962, p/f)
- Helius Eobanus Hessus, pseudonym of Eoban Koch (1488–1540, p)
- Georg Heym (1887–1912, p/nf/d)
- Stefan Heym, pseudonym of Hellmuth Flieg (1913–2001, f/nf/ch)
- Paul Heyse (1830–1914, f/d)
- Charlotte von Hezel (1755–1817, nf)
- Wolfgang Hilbig (1941–2007, p/nf)
- Wolfgang Hildesheimer (1916–1991, f/d)
- Kurt Hiller (1885–1972, nf/p)
- Edgar Hilsenrath (1926–2018, f/nf)
- Theodor Gottlieb von Hippel (1741–1796, nf)
- Rolf Hochhuth (1931–2020, d/f)
- Fritz Hochwälder (1911–1986, d)
- Jakob van Hoddis, pseudonym of Hans Davidsohn (1887–1942, p)
- E. T. A. Hoffmann (1776–1822, f)
- Heinrich Hoffmann (1809–1894, nf/ch)
- August Heinrich Hoffmann von Fallersleben (1798–1874, p/ch)
- Gert Hofmann (1931–1993, d/f/nf)
- Hugo von Hofmannsthal (1874–1929, f/p/d)
- Robert Hohlbaum (1886–1955, f/d)
- Franz Hohler (born 1943, f/nf/p/d/ch)
- Friedrich Hölderlin (1770–1843, p/nf)
- Walter Höllerer (1922–2003, nf/p/d/f)
- Karl von Holtei (1798–1880, p)
- Hans Egon Holthusen (1913–1997, p/nf)
- Ludwig Heinrich Christoph Hölty (1748–1776, p)
- Arno Holz (1863–1929, p/d)
- Barbara Honigmann (born 1949, f/nf/d)
- Axel Honneth (born 1949, nf)
- Hans von Hopfen, pseudonym of Hans Mayer (1835–1904, p/f)
- Felicitas Hoppe (born 1960, f/nf/ch)
- Kim de l'Horizon (born 1992, f/d/p)
- Max Horkheimer (1895–1973, nf)
- Ödön von Horvath (1901–1938, d/f)
- Hrabanus Maurus (c. 780–856, p/nf)
- Ricarda Huch (1864–1947, nf/f/p)
- Peter Huchel (1903–1981, p)
- Norbert Hummelt (born 1962, p/nf)
- Wilhelm Hünermann (1900–1975, nf)
- Christian Friedrich Hunold (1681–1721, f/p)
- Thomas Hürlimann (born 1950, d/f)
- Hanns Dieter Hüsch (1925–2005, nf)
- Edmund Husserl (1859–1938, nf)
- Ulrich von Hutten (1488–1523, nf/p)

== I ==
- August Wilhelm Iffland (1759–1814, d)
- Karl Immermann (1796–1840, p/d/f)

== J ==
- Heinrich Eduard Jacob (1889–1967, nf/f/d)
- Friedrich Heinrich Jacobi (1743–1819, nf)
- Johann Georg Jacobi (1740–1814, p/nf)
- Hans Henny Jahnn (1894–1959, f/d)
- Ernst Jandl (1925–2000, p)
- Jans der Enikel (fl. late 13th c., p/nf)
- Tommy Jaud (born 1970, d/nf)
- Jean Paul (Johann Paul Friedrich Richter) (1763–1825, f)
- Elfriede Jelinek (born 1946, d/f)
- Walter Jens (1923–2013, nf)
- Wilhelm Jensen (1837–1911, f/p)
- Johannes von Tepl (c. 1350 – c. 1415, p)
- Albrecht von Johansdorf (c. 1185 – c. 1209, p)
- Uwe Johnson (1934–1984, f/nf)
- Hanns Johst (1890–1978, f/d/nf)
- Ernst Jünger (1895–1998, f/nf)
- Peter Stephan Jungk (born 1952, f)
- Robert Jungk (1913–1994, nf)
- Antonie Jüngst (1843–1918, p/f/nf)
- Johann Heinrich Jung-Stilling, pseudonym of Johann Heinrich Jung (1740–1817, nf)

== K ==
- Franz Kafka (1883–1924, f)
- Friedrich Kaiser (1814–1874, d/f)
- Georg Kaiser (1878–1945, d)
- Max Kalbeck (1850–1921, nf)
- Mascha Kaléko (1907–1975, p)
- David Kalisch (1820–1872, d/nf)
- Wladimir Kaminer (born 1967, f/nf)
- Anja Kampmann (born 1983, p/f)
- Hermann Kant (1926–2016, f/d)
- Immanuel Kant (1724–1804, nf)
- Franz Xaver Kappus (1883–1966, p/f/d)
- Hellmuth Karasek (1934–2015, nf/f)
- Ulrich Karger (born 1957, nf/ch)
- Marie Luise Kaschnitz (1901–1974, f/nf/p)
- Abraham Gotthelf Kästner (1719–1800, nf)
- Erich Kästner (1899–1974, ch/p/nf)
- Walter Kaufmann (1924–2021, f)
- Helmut Käutner (1908–1980, d)
- Daniel Kehlmann (born 1975, f/d)
- Jürgen Kehrer (born 1956, f)
- Ernst Keil (1816–1878, nf)
- Gottfried Keller (1819–1890, p/f/nf)
- Hans Peter Keller (1915–1988, p)
- Werner Keller (1909–1980, nf)
- Friedrich Kellner (1885–1970, nf)
- Walter Kempowski (1929–2007, f/nf)
- Johannes Kepler (1571–1630, nf)
- Navid Kermani (born 1967, f/nf/ch)
- Justinus Kerner (1786–1862, p/nf)
- Alfred Kerr, pseudonym of Alfred Kempner (1867–1948, nf)
- Judith Kerr (1923–2019, ch)
- Irmgard Keun (1905–1982, f)
- Eduard von Keyserling (1855–1918, f/d/nf)
- Abbas Khadir (born 1973, p/f/nf)
- Johann Gottfried Kinkel (1815–1882, p/d/nf)
- Bodo Kirchhoff (born 1948, d/f)
- Sarah Kirsch (1935–2013, p/nf)
- Hans Hellmut Kirst (1914–1989, f)
- Egon Erwin Kisch (1885–1948, f/nf)
- Karin Kiwus (born 1942, p)
- Klabund (1890–1928, d/f/nf/p)
- Johann Klaj (1616–1656, p/d)
- Michael Kleeberg (born 1959, f/nf/d)
- Ewald Christian von Kleist (1715–1759, p)
- Heinrich von Kleist (1777–1811, p/d/f)
- Jochen Klepper (1903–1942, p/nf)
- Ernst August Friedrich Klingemann (1777–1831, f/d)
- Friedrich Maximilian Klinger (1752–1831, d/f)
- Friedrich Gottlieb Klopstock (1724–1803, p/nf)
- Alexander Kluge (1932–2026, d/f/nf)
- Ruth Klüger (1931–2020, nf)
- Hildegard Knef (1925–2002, nf)
- Werner Koch (1926–1992, nf)
- Dayan Kodua (born 1980, nf), born in Ghana
- Matthias Koeppel (1937–2026, p/nf)
- Wolfgang Koeppen (1906–1996, f/nf)
- Gerhard Kofler (1949–2005, p/nf)
- Michael Köhlmeier (born 1949, p/f/nf)
- Oskar Kokoschka (1886–1980, p/d/nf)
- Gertrud Kolmar (1894–1943, p/nf), Holocaust victim
- Leopold Kompert (1822–1886, f/nf)
- Konrad von Würzburg (c. 1220–1287, p)
- Heinz G. Konsalik, pseudonym of Heinz Günther (1921–1999, f)
- August Kopisch (1799–1853, p)
- Paul Kornfeld (1889–1942, d/nf)
- August von Kotzebue (1761–1819, f/d)
- Siegfried Kracauer (1889–1966, nf/f)
- Christian Kracht (born 1966, f/nf)
- Robert Kraft (1869–1916, f)
- Karl Kraus (1874–1936, nf/d/p)
- Helmut Krausser (born 1964, f/p/d)
- Ursula Krechel (born 1947, f/p/d/nf)
- Georg Kreisler (1922–2011, p/f/nf)
- Franz Xaver Kroetz (born 1946, d)
- Horst Krüger (1919–1999, f/nf)
- Michael Krüger (born 1943, f/nf/p)
- Friedrich Adolf Krummacher (1767–1845, nf/p)
- Max Kruse (1921–2015, ch)
- James Krüss (1926–1997, ch/p/f)
- Alfred Kubin (1877–1959, f)
- Nadja Küchenmeister (born 1981, p/nf)
- Adam Kuckhoff (1887–1943, f/nf)
- Johannes Kuen (1606–1675, p)
- Franz Theodor Kugler (1808–1858, nf)
- Johann Kuhnau (1660–1722, f/nf)
- Michael Kumpfmüller (born 1961, nf/f)
- Johann Kunckel (1630–1703, nf)
- Günter Kunert (1929–2019, p/f/nf)
- Thor Kunkel (born 1963, f)
- Reiner Kunze (born 1933, p/nf)
- Elisar von Kupffer (1872–1942, p/nf/d)
- Dirk Kurbjuweit (born 1962, f/nf)
- Hermann Kurz (1813–1873, p/f)
- Isolde Kurz (1853–1944, p/f)
- Kurt Kusenberg (1904–1983, f)

== L ==
- Gustav Landauer (1870–1919, nf)
- Karl Heinrich Lang (1764–1835, nf)
- Katja Lange-Müller (born 1951, f/d)
- Elisabeth Langgässer, pseudonym of E. L. Hoffmann (1899–1950, p/f)
- Sophie von La Roche (1730–1807, f)
- Else Lasker-Schüler (1869–1945, p/f/d)
- Kurd Laßwitz (1848–1910, f/nf)
- Heinrich Laube (1806–1884, d/f)
- Josef Lauff (1855–1933, p/d)
- Christine Lavant (1915–1973, p)
- Johann Kaspar Lavater (1741–1801, p/nf)
- Richard Leander, pseudonym of Richard von Volkmann (1830–1889, p/f)
- Benjamin Lebert (born 1982, f/nf)
- Gertrud von Le Fort (1876–1971, f/p/nf)
- Nikolaus Lenau (1802–1850, p)
- Ellen Lenneck, pseudonym for Helene Weichardt (1851–1880, f)
- Michael Lentz (born 1964, p)
- Jakob Michael Reinhold Lenz (1751–1792, p/d/nf)
- Siegfried Lenz (1926–2014, f/nf/d)
- Paul Leppin (1879–1945, f)
- Alexander Lernet-Holenia (1897–1976, p/f/d)
- Gotthold Ephraim Lessing (1729–1781, nf/d)
- Theodor Lessing (1872–1933, nf)
- Reinhard Lettau (1929–1996, p/f/nf)
- Gertrud Leutenegger (1948–2025, p/f/d)
- Rahel Levin (1771–1833, nf)
- Fanny Lewald (1811–1889, f/nf)
- Sibylle Lewitscharoff (1954–2023, f/nf/d)
- Georg Christoph Lichtenberg (1742–1799, nf)
- Herbert Lichtenfeld (1927–2001, d)
- Alfred Lichtenstein (1889–1914, p/f)
- Heinz Liepmann (1905–1966, f/nf)
- Detlev von Liliencron (1844–1909, p/f)
- Kurt Linck (born 1889, nf)
- Paul Lindau (1839–1919, d/f)
- Mira Lobe (1913–1995, ch)
- Erich Loest (1926–2013, f/d)
- Friedrich von Logau (1604–1655, p)
- Daniel Casper von Lohenstein (1635–1683, d/nf/p)
- Hermann Löns (1866–1914, f/nf/p)
- Jakob Lorber (1800–1864, nf)
- Rudolf Lorenzen (1922–2013, f)
- Hieronymus Lorm, pseudonym of Heinrich Landesmann (1821–1902, p/nf)
- Ernst Lothar, pseudonym of Ernst Lothar Müller (1890–1974, f)
- Rudolf Lothar (1865–1933, d/f)
- Michael Lüders (born 1959, nf/f)
- Emil Ludwig, pseudonym of Emil Cohn (1881–1948, nf)
- Otto Ludwig (1813–1865, d/f/nf)
- Jonas Lüscher (born 1976, f/nf)
- Martin Luther (1483–1546, nf)
- J. J. Lynx (c. 1900 – unknown date of death, nf)

== M ==
- Paul Maar (born 1937, ch)
- John Henry Mackay (1864–1933, nf)
- Andreas Mand (born 1959, f/nf/d)
- Erika Mann (1905–1969, nf)
- Golo Mann (1909–1994, nf)
- Heinrich Mann (1871–1950, f/nf)
- Klaus Mann (1906–1949, f/nf)
- Michael Mann (1919–1977, nf)
- Thomas Mann (1875–1955, f/nf)
- Hans Marchwitza (1890–1965, p/nf)
- Herbert Marcuse (1898–1979, nf)
- Ludwig Marcuse (1894–1971, nf)
- Giwi Margwelaschwili (1927–2020, f/nf)
- Karl von Marinelli (1745–1803, d)
- Monika Maron (born 1941, f/nf)
- Harald Martenstein (born 1953, f/nf)
- Karl Marx (1818–1883, nf)
- Friedrich von Matthisson (1761–1831, p)
- Fritz Mauthner (1849–1923, f/nf)
- Karl May (1842–1912, f/nf/ch)
- Marius von Mayenburg (born 1972, d)
- Hans Mayer (1907–2001, nf)
- Friederike Mayröcker (1924–2021, f/p/d)
- Mechthild of Magdeburg (1210 – c. 1285, nf)
- Christoph Meckel (1935–2020, p/f/nf)
- Miriam Meckel (born 1967, nf)
- Selma Meerbaum-Eisinger (1924–1942, p), Holocaust victim
- Walter Mehring (1896–1981, nf)
- Ulrike Meinhof (1934–1976, nf)
- Wilhelm Meinhold (1797–1851, p/d/f)
- Paul Melissus, pseudonym of Schede (1539–1602, nf/p)
- Eva Menasse (born 1970, f/nf)
- Robert Menasse (born 1954, f/nf)
- Meron Mendel (born 1976, nf)
- Moses Mendelssohn (1729–1786, nf)
- Wolfgang Menzel (1798–1873, p/nf)
- Pascal Mercier, pseudonym of Peter Bieri (1944–2023, nf)
- Johann Heinrich Merck (1741–1791, nf)
- Sophie Mereau (1770–1806, f/p)
- Conrad Ferdinand Meyer (1825–1898, p/f)
- Melchior Meyr (1810–1872, p/f/nf)
- Gustav Meyrink, pseudonym of Gustav Meyer (1868–1932, f/d)
- Agnes Miegel (1879–1964, f/nf/p)
- Jo Mihaly (1902–1989, f)
- Waltraud Anna Mitgutsch (born 1948, f/nf)
- Alexander Mitscherlich (1908–1982, nf)
- Margarete Mitscherlich-Nielsen (1917–2012, nf)
- Klaus Modick (born 1951, f/nf)
- Georg Mohr (1870–1928, nf)
- Paul Möhring (1890–1976, nf)
- Walter von Molo (1880–1958, f/d/nf)
- Terézia Mora (born 1971, f/nf/d)
- Christian Morgenstern (1871–1914, p)
- Irmtraud Morgner (1933–1990, f/nf)
- Daniel Georg Morhof (1639–1691, nf)
- Eduard Mörike (1804–1875, p/f)
- Karl Philipp Moritz (1756–1793, nf/f)
- Petra Morsbach (born 1956, f)
- Johann Michael Moscherosch (1601–1669, nf)
- Julius Mosen, pseudonym of Julius Moses (1803–1867, p/d/f)
- Johann Joseph Most (1846–1906, nf)
- Hans Much (1880–1932, nf)
- Erich Mühsam (1878–1934, nf/p/d)
- Adam Heinrich Müller (1779–1829, nf)
- Friedrich Müller (called Maler Müller) (1749–1825, p/d)
- Heiner Müller (1929–1995, p/nf)
- Herta Müller (born 1953, f/p/nf)
- Inge Müller (1925–1966, nf)
- Wilhelm Müller (called Griechen-Müller) (1794–1827, p)
- Wolfgang Müller von Königswinter (1816–1873, f/p/nf)
- Theodor Mundt (1808–1861, nf/f)
- Thomas Murner (1475–1536, nf/p)
- Johann Karl August Musäus (1735–1787, f)
- Adolf Muschg (born 1934, f/nf)
- Robert Musil (1880–1942, nf/f)

== N ==
- Herbert Nachbar (1930–1980, f/d)
- Neidhart von Reuenthal (c. 1190 – c. 1245, p)
- Johann Nestroy (1802–1862, p/d)
- Alfred Neumann (1895–1952, f/p/d)
- Natias Neutert (born 1941, f/p)
- Eckhart Nickel (born 1966, nf)
- Friedrich Nicolai (1733–1811, nf)
- Ernst Niebergall (1815–1843, f/d)
- Friedrich Nietzsche (1844–1900, nf/p)
- Dieter Noll (1927–2008, f/p)
- Ingrid Noll (born 1935, f)
- Hans Erich Nossack (1901–1977, f/nf/p/d)
- Christine Nöstlinger (1936–2018, ch)
- Helene von Nostitz (1878–1944, f), (de:Helene von Nostitz)
- Helga M. Novak (1935–2013, p/f)
- Novalis, pseudonym of Friedrich von Hardenberg (1772–1801, p/nf)

== O ==
- Martin Opitz (1597–1639, p)
- Hanns-Josef Ortheil (born 1951, f/nf)
- Ernst Ortlepp (1800–1864, p)
- Andreas Osiander (1496–1552, nf)
- Carl von Ossietzky (1889–1938, nf)
- Oswald von Wolkenstein (1377–1445, p)
- Otfrid von Weißenburg (c. 800 – post-870, p)
- Emine Sevgi Özdamar (born 1946, f/nf)

== P ==
- Oskar Panizza (1853–1921, d/f/p)
- Franz von Papen (1879–1969, nf)
- Harald Parigger (born 1953, nf/p/ch)
- Peggy Parnass (1927–2025, nf/f)
- Oskar Pastior (1927–2006, p/nf)
- Jean Paul, pseudonym of Johann Paul Friedrich Richter (1763–1825, f)
- Erica Pedretti (1930–2022, nf)
- Annette Pehnt (born 1967, nf)
- Ulrich Peltzer (born 1956, f)
- Ernst Penzoldt (1892–1955, f)
- Leo Perutz (1882–1957, f/nf)
- Johann Heinrich Pestalozzi (1746–1827, f/nf)
- Julius Petri (1868–1894, nf)
- Ludwig Pfau (1821–1894, p/nf)
- Anita Pichler (1948–1997, f/nf)
- Karoline Pichler (1769–1843, f)
- Theodor Piderit (1826–1912, d/nf)
- Heinz Piontek (1925–2003, p/nf)
- Willibald Pirckheimer (1470–1530, nf)
- Hermann Peter Piwitt (1935–2026, f/nf)
- August von Platen-Hallermünde, pseudonym August Graf von Platen (1796–1835, p/d)
- Ulrich Plenzdorf (1934–2007, d/f)
- Luise von Ploennies (1803–1872, p/d)
- Johannes Praetorius, pseudonym of Hans Schultze (1630–1680, nf)
- Paula von Preradović (1887–1951, p/f/nf)
- Otfried Preußler (1923–2013, ch)
- Robert Prutz (1816–1872, p/nf/d)
- Stanisław Przybyszewski (1868–1927, f/d/p)
- Hermann von Pückler-Muskau (1785–1871, nf)

== Q ==
- Helmut Qualtinger (1928–1986, d/nf)

== R ==
- Wilhelm Raabe (1831–1910, f)
- Rabanus Maurus (c. 780–856, nf/p), also Rhabanus or Hrabanus
- Gottlieb Wilhelm Rabener (1714–1771, nf)
- Ferdinand Raimund (1790–1836, d)
- Ilma Rakusa (born 1946, f/nf/p)
- Karl Wilhelm Ramler (1725–1798, p)
- Christoph Ransmayr (born 1954, nf/f)
- Wilhelm Rath (1897–1973, nf)
- Lutz Rathenow (born 1952, f/p/d/ch)
- Wolfgang Ratke (1571–1635, nf)
- Jan Philipp Reemtsma (born 1952, nf/ch)
- Sven Regener (born 1961, p/f)
- Ruth Rehmann (1922–2016, f/d)
- Wilhelm Reich (1897–1957, nf)
- Marcel Reich-Ranicki (1920–2013, nf)
- Ilse Reicke (1893–1989, f/nf)
- Brigitte Reimann (1933–1973, f/nf)
- Uwe Reimer (1948–2004, nf)
- Herbert Reinecker (1914–2007, f/d)
- Reinmar von Hagenau (c. 1160/1170 – pre-1210, p)
- Reinmar von Zweter (c. 1225 – c. 1250, p)
- Ludwig Rellstab (1799–1860, p/nf)
- Erich Maria Remarque, pseudonym of Erich Paul Remark (1898–1970, f/d/nf)
- Joscha Remus (born 1958, nf/ch)
- Lothar Rendulic (1897–1971, nf)
- Sir John Retcliffe, pseudonym of Hermann Goedsche (1815–1878, nf)
- Johannes Reuchlin (1455–1522, nf)
- Fritz Reuter (1810–1874, f/p)
- Felix Rexhausen (1932–1992, f/nf/p/d)
- Hans Peter Richter (1926–1993, ch/nf)
- Hans Werner Richter (1908–1993, f/nf)
- Horst-Eberhard Richter (1923–2011, nf)
- Frieda von Richthofen (1879–1956, nf), later Frieda Lawrence
- Brigitte Riebe (born 1953, f)
- Karl Riha (1935–2026, p/f/nf)
- Rainer Maria Rilke (1875–1926, p/f)
- Joachim Ringelnatz (1883–1934, p/nf)
- Luise Rinser (1911–2002, f/nf/ch)
- Johann Rist (1607–1667, p/d)
- Robert Roberthin (1600–1648, p)
- Charlotte Roche (born 1978, f)
- Alexander Roda Roda, pseudonym of Šandor Friedrich Rosenfeld (1872–1945, nf)
- Sophie Rogge-Börner (1878–1955, nf)
- Peter Rosegger, pseudonym of Roßegger (1843–1918, f/nf/p)
- Peter Rosei (born 1946, f/nf/ch)
- Ernst Rosmer, pseudonym of Elsa Bernstein (1866–1949, d/f/nf)
- Johann Leonhard Rost (1688–1727, nf)
- Eugen Roth (1895–1976, p)
- Friederike Roth (born 1948, d)
- Gerhard Roth (1942–2022, f/d/nf)
- Joseph Roth (1894–1939, f/nf)
- Patrick Roth (born 1953, f/nf)
- Stephan Ludwig Roth (1796–1849, nf)
- Ralf Rothmann (born 1953, f/nf/p/d)
- Toni Rothmund (1877–1956, f/nf)
- Friedrich Rückert (1788–1866, p/nf)
- Rudolf von Ems (c. 1200 – c. 1253, p)

== S ==
- Ferdinand von Saar (1833–1906, f/d/p)
- Leopold von Sacher-Masoch (1836–1895, f/nf)
- Hans Sachs (1494–1576, p/d)
- Nelly Sachs (1891–1970, p/d)
- Ernst von Salomon (1902–1972, nf)
- Felix Salten, pseudonym of Siegmund Salzmann (1869–1945, d/f/nf)
- Christian Gotthilf Salzmann (1744–1811, nf)
- Marianna Salzmann (born 1985, d/f/nf)
- Mithu Sanyal (born 1971, f/nf)
- Adolf Friedrich von Schack (1815–1894, p/nf)
- Jakob Schaffner (1875–1944, f)
- Judith Schalansky (born 1980, f/nf)
- Rafik Schami (born 1946, f/nf)
- Paul Scheerbart (1863–1915, f/nf/p)
- Leopold Schefer (1784–1862, p/f)
- Joseph Victor von Scheffel (1826–1886, p/f)
- Johann Hermann Schein (1586–1630, p)
- Ronald M. Schernikau (1960–1991, f/nf/d/p)
- Johannes Scherr (1817–1886, f/nf)
- Norbert Scheuer (born 1951, f/p)
- Emanuel Schikaneder (1751–1812, d/p/f)
- Friedrich Schiller (1759–1805, d/p/nf)
- Roland Schimmelpfennig (born 1967, d/f)
- Baldur von Schirach (1907–1974, nf)
- Ferdinand von Schirach (born 1964, f/nf/d/ch)
- Johannes Schlaf (1862–1941, d/p)
- August Wilhelm Schlegel (1767–1845, p/nf)
- Friedrich Schlegel (1772–1829, p/nf)
- Johann Elias Schlegel (1719–1749, nf/p)
- Bernhard Schlink (born 1944, f/nf)
- Arno Schmidt (1914–1979, f/nf)
- Jochen Schmidt (born 1970, f/nf)
- Michael Schmidt-Salomon (born 1967, nf/ch)
- Elke Schmitter (born 1961, f/p)
- Max Schneckenburger (1819–1849, p)
- Louis Schneider (1805–1878, d/nf)
- Peter Schneider (1940–2026, f/nf)
- Reinhold Schneider (1903–1958, p/f)
- Arthur Schnitzler (1862–1931, d/f/nf)
- Wolfdietrich Schnurre (1920–1989, f/nf/ch)
- Peter Scholl-Latour (1924–2014, nf)
- Johanna Schopenhauer (1766–1838, nf/f)
- Friedrich Ludwig Schröder (1744–1816, d)
- Rainer M. Schröder (born 1951, f/ch)
- Christian Friedrich Daniel Schubart (1739–1791, p/nf)
- Helga Schubert (born 1940, f/nf/ch)
- Levin Schücking (1814–1883, f/nf)
- Franz Schuh (born 1947, f/nf)
- Tony Schumacher (1848–1931, ch/nf)
- Gustav Schwab (1792–1850, p/nf)
- Werner Schwab (1958–1994, d)
- Dietrich Schwanitz (1940–2004, f/nf)
- Achim Schwarze (born 1958, nf)
- Alice Schwarzer (born 1942, nf)
- Kurt Schwitters (1887–1948, p/nf)
- Charles Sealsfield, pseudonym of Karl Anton Postl (1793–1864, f/nf)
- W. G. Sebald (1944–2001, f/nf)
- Robert Seethaler (born 1966, f/d)
- Anna Seghers, pseudonym of Netty Radvanyi (1900–1983, f/nf)
- Ina Seidel (1885–1974, f/p)
- Lutz Seiler (born 1963, p/f)
- Franz Seldte (1882–1947, nf)
- Edgar Selge (born 1948, nf)
- Walter Serner (1889–1942, f/nf)
- Clemens J. Setz (born 1982, f/nf/d/p)
- Wolfram Setz (1941–2023, nf)
- Johann Gottfried Seume (1763–1810, nf/d/p)
- Heinrich Seuse (c. 1300–1366, nf)
- Dalal Khario (born c. 1997, nf)
- Friedrich Sieburg (1893–1964, nf)
- Johannes Mario Simmel (1924–2009, d/f)
- Karl Simrock (1802–1876, nf)
- Curt Siodmak (1902–2000, f/d)
- Johann Sithmann (1602–1666, nf)
- Peter Sloterdijk (born 1947, nf)
- Angela Sommer-Bodenburg (born 1948, ch)
- Joseph von Sonnenfels (1733–1817, nf/f)
- Jura Soyfer (1912–1939, nf), Holocaust victim
- Manès Sperber (1905–1984, f/nf)
- Hilde Spiel (1911–1990, f/nf)
- Friedrich Spielhagen (1829–1911, f/nf)
- Carl Spitteler (1845–1924, p)
- Johanna Spyri (1827–1901, ch)
- Reiner Stach (born 1951, nf)
- Arnold Stadler (born 1954, f/nf/p)
- Saša Stanišić (born 1978, f/ch/nf)
- Albert Steffen (1884–1963, p/d/nf)
- Andreas Steinhöfel (born 1962, f/ch)
- Angela Steinmüller (born 1941, nf/f)
- Karlheinz Steinmüller (born 1950, nf/f)
- Ginka Steinwachs, pseudonym of Gisela Steinwachs (born 1942, d/f/nf)
- Adolf Stern, pseudonym of Adolf Ernst (1835–1907, nf/p)
- Fritz Steuben, pseudonym of Erhard Wittek (1898–1981, f)
- Adalbert Stifter (1805–1868, f)
- Julius Stinde (1841–1905, d/f/nf)
- Max Stirner (1806–1856, nf)
- Helene Stöcker (1869–1943, nf)
- Christian zu Stolberg-Stolberg (1748–1821, p)
- Theodor Storm (1817–1888, f/p)
- August Stramm (1874–1915, p/d)
- Botho Strauß (born 1944, d/f/nf)
- Lulu von Strauss und Torney (1873–1956, d/f)
- Erwin Strittmatter (1912–1994, nf)
- Eva Strittmatter (1930–2011, p/nf/ch)
- Antje Rávic Strubel (born 1974, f/nf)
- Julius Sturm (1816–1896, p)
- Hermann Sudermann (1857–1928, d/f/nf)
- Dana von Suffrin (born 1985, f)
- Patrick Süskind (born 1949, f/d)
- Wilhelm Emanuel Süskind (1901–1970, nf)
- Süßkind von Trimberg (1230–1300, p)
- Rita Süssmuth (1937–2026, nf)
- Martin Suter (born 1948, f/d)
- Bertha von Suttner (1843–1914, f/nf)
- Leonie Swann (born 1975, f)
- Carmen Sylva, pseudonym of Elisabeth Queen of Romania (1843–1916, p/d/f)
- Péter Szondi (1929–1971, nf)

== T ==
- George Tabori (1914–2007, d/f)
- Rudolf Tarnow (1867–1933, p/nf/ch)
- Johannes Tauler (c. 1300–1361, nf)
- Gabriele Tergit (1894–1982, f/nf)
- Gerhard Tersteegen (1697–1769, nf/p)
- Jürgen Theobaldy (born 1944, p/f/nf)
- Klaus Theweleit (born 1942, nf)
- Ludwig Thoma (1867–1921, f/nf/d)
- Moritz August von Thummel (1738–1817, f/nf)
- Harry Thürk (1927–2005, f/nf/ch)
- Ludwig Tieck (1773–1853, p/f/nf)
- Uwe Timm (born 1940, f)
- Ernst Toller (1893–1939, d)
- Friedrich Torberg, pseudonym of Friedrich Kantor-Berg (1908–1979, f/nf)
- Georg Trakl (1887–1914, p)
- B. Traven (1882–1969, f)
- Ilija Trojanow (born 1965, nf)
- Kurt Tucholsky (1890–1935, nf/p/f)

== U ==
- Ludwig Uhland (1787–1862, p/nf)
- Regina Ullmann (1884–1961, p/nf)
- Ulrich von Liechtenstein (c. 1198 – c. 1276, p)
- Ulrich von Zatzikhofen (13th c., p)
- Hermann Ungar (1893–1929, d/f)
- Fritz von Unruh (1885–1970, d/p/f)
- Johann Peter Uz (1720–1796, p)

== V ==
- Joachim Vadianus, pseudonym of Joachim von Watt (1484–1551, nf)
- Karl Valentin, pseudonym of Valentin Ludwig Fey (1882–1948, d/nf)
- Jan Valtin (1905–1951, f)
- Birgit Vanderbeke (1956–2021, f/nf)
- Karl August Varnhagen von Ense (1785–1858, nf)
- Rahel Varnhagen (1771–1833, nf)
- Berthold Viertel (1885–1953, d)
- Friedrich Theodor Vischer (1807–1887, f/p/d)
- Johann Heinrich Voss (1751–1826, p/nf)
- Richard Voss (1851–1918, d/f)
- Christian August Vulpius (1762–1827, f/d)

== W ==
- Wilhelm Heinrich Wackenroder (1773–1798, nf)
- Heinrich Leopold Wagner (1747–1779, d)
- Jan Wagner (born 1971, p/nf)
- Jan Costin Wagner (born 1972, f)
- Richard Wagner (1952–2023, p/f/nf)
- Siegfried Wagner (1869–1930, d)
- Wilhelm Waiblinger (1804–1830, p/f)
- Walahfrid Strabo (c. 810–849, nf/p)
- Max Waldau (1821 or 1825–1855, p/f)
- Herwarth Walden, pseudonym of Georg Lewin (1878–1941, nf)
- Günter Wallraff (born 1942, nf)
- Martin Walser (1927–2023, nf/f)
- Robert Walser (1878–1956, f/nf)
- Walther von der Vogelweide (c. 1170 – c. 1230, p)
- Maxie Wander (1933–1977, f)
- Gustav von Wangenheim (1895–1975, d)
- Jakob Wassermann (1873–1934, f/p/nf)
- Marianne Weber (1870–1954, nf)
- Hermann von Wedderkop (1875–1956, nf/f)
- Frank Wedekind (1864–1918, d/p/f)
- Armin T. Wegner (1886–1978, nf)
- Josef Magnus Wehner (1891–1973, d)
- Wilhelm Weigand (1862–1949, p/f/nf)
- Grete Weil (1906–1999, f/nf/d)
- Anna Elisabet Weirauch (1887–1970, d/f)
- Ernst Weiss (1884–1940, f/d/nf)
- Peter Weiss (1916–1982, d/f)
- Ruth Weiss (1924–2025, f/nf/ch)
- Wilhelm Weitling (1808–1871, nf)
- Ehm Welk (1884–1966, d/nf/f)
- Harald Welzer (born 1958, nf)
- Franz Werfel (1890–1945, f/d/p)
- Benedikt Maria Leonhard von Werkmeister (1745–1823, nf)
- Markus Werner (1944–2016, f)
- Zacharias Werner (1768–1823, p/d/nf)
- Christian Wernicke (1661–1725, p/d/nf)
- Ignaz Heinrich von Wessenberg (1774–1860, nf/p)
- Ruth Westheimer (1928–2024, nf)
- Ulrich Wickert (born 1942, nf/f)
- Ernst Wiechert (1887–1950, f/p/nf)
- Carsten Wieland (born 1971, nf)
- Christoph Martin Wieland (1733–1813, p/f)
- Adolf Wilbrandt (1837–1911, f/d)
- Ernst von Wildenbruch (1845–1901, p/d)
- Ottilie Wildermuth (1817–1877, ch/f/nf)
- Bruno Wille (1860–1928, nf)
- Roger Willemsen (1955–2016, nf)
- Johann Joachim Winckelmann (1717–1768, nf)
- Eugen Gottlob Winkler (1912–1936, nf)
- Josef Winkler (born 1953, f/nf)
- Heinrich Wittenwiler (c. 1370–1420, p)
- Karl August Wittfogel (1896–1988, d/nf)
- Gabriele Wohmann (1932–2015, f/p/d)
- Christa Wolf (1929–2011, f/nf)
- Friedrich Wolf (1888–1953, d/f/ch)
- Julius Wolff (1834–1910, p/f)
- Wolfram von Eschenbach (1170–1220, p)
- Karl Wolfskehl (1869–1948, p/nf/d)
- Hans Wollschläger (1935–2007, f/nf)
- Ernst von Wolzogen (1855–1934, nf/f)
- Caroline von Wolzogen (1763–1847, f/nf)
- Wolf Wondratschek (born 1943, p/f/nf)
- Paul Wühr (1927–2016, f/p/d)
- Christine Wunnicke (born 1966, f/nf)
- Takis Würger (born 1985, f/nf)
- Mathilde Wurm (1874–1935, nf)
- Ignaz Wurz (1731–1784, nf)

== Y ==
- Bahar Yilmaz (born 1984, nf)
- Barbara Yelin (born 1977, nf/f)

== Z ==
- Peter-Paul Zahl (1944–2011, p/f/d)
- Feridun Zaimoğlu (born 1964, f/nf)
- Joseph Christian von Zedlitz (1790–1862, d/p/nf)
- Juli Zeh (born 1974, f)
- Eva Zeller (1923–2022, p/f)
- Alexander Ziegler (German writer) (1822–1887, nf)
- Alexander Ziegler (Swiss writer) (1944–1987, f/nf/d)
- Nikolaus Ludwig von Zinzendorf (1700–1760, nf/p)
- Kathinka Zitz-Halein (1801–1877, p/f)
- Johann Heinrich Daniel Zschokke (1771–1848, nf/f)
- Karl Zuchardt (1887–1968, f)
- Carl Zuckmayer (1896–1977, d)
- Unica Zürn (1916–1970, p/f)
- Arnold Zweig (1887–1968, f/d/nf/p)
- Stefan Zweig (1881–1942, f/d/nf)
- Stefanie Zweig (1932–2014, f/ch/nf)
- Gerhard Zwerenz (1925–2015, f/nf)
- Jan Zweyer, pseudonym of Rüdiger Richartz (born 1953, nf)
- Hans von Zwiedineck-Südenhorst (1845–1906, nf)

== See also ==
- List of Germans
- List of German-language philosophers
- List of German-language playwrights
- List of German-language poets
- List of German journalists
- List of German women writers
- List of Austrian women writers
- List of Swiss women writers
- Lists of writers
