= Kofler =

Kofler is a surname. Notable people with the name include:

- Adelheid Kofler (1889–1985), Austrian chemist, mineralogist, and inventor
- Andreas Kofler (1984-), Austrian skijumper
- Bärbel Kofler (born 1967), German politician
- Edward Kofler (1911 − 2007), Polish-Swiss mathematician
- Fuzzy Kofler (born 1948), Italian rally driver
- Gerhard Kofler (1949 - 2005), South Tyrolian writer
- Helmut Kofler, U.S. soccer player
- Leo Kofler (1907 - 1995), German social philosopher
- Matt Kofler (1959–2008), American football player
- Maximilian Kofler (born 2000), Austrian motorcycle rider
- Thomas Kofler (born 1998), Austrian footballer
