= Leah Carola Czollek =

German mediator (born 1954)

Leah Carola Czollek (born 3 June 1954 in East Berlin) is a German author, mediator and trainer.

== Life ==
Czollek grew up in East Berlin as the daughter of the publisher Walter Czollek. She studied law at Humboldt-Universität zu Berlin from 1974 to 1980. In 2008 she completed a degree in social work (BA) at the Potsdam University of Applied Sciences. Since 1994 she has worked as a freelance trainer in the field of adult education, since 1999 as a lecturer at the Alice Salomon University, since 2002 as a mediator. Since 2005, she has been head of the "Social Justice and Diversity" institute as well as a trainer and instructor.

In 1999, Czollek founded the private institute "Czollek Consult. Institute for Mediation, Diversity and Dialogue". Inspired by the "Diversity and Social Justice Education" model developed at the University of Massachusetts, she designed an education and training concept called "Social Justice and Diversity" for German-speaking countries together with Heike Weinbach and Gudrun Perko in 2001.

In 2005, together with Perko and Weinbach, she founded the "Social Justice and Diversity Institute". The social justice and diversity training programme is an educational concept for inclusion, participation and involvement that is critical of discrimination. In addition to Czollek and Perko, the institute's team consists of Max Czollek and Corinne Kaszner. The institute cooperates with the DGB-Bildungswerk, the Alice Salomon University of Applied Sciences Berlin and, since 2012, with the University of Applied Sciences Potsdam's Centre for Continuing Education. The training has been scientifically evaluated. Czollek also organises workshops and training sessions on the individual focal points of the training (such as the basics of social justice and anti-discriminatory diversity as well as classism, racism, anti-Semitism, ableism, East/West, ageism/adultism, sexism, shifting perspectives and empowerment strategies). In 2019, the Institute for Social Justice and Diversity was renamed the Institute for Social Justice and Radical Diversity.

== Work ==
From 2000 to 2012, Czollek was co-editor of the journal Quer. Thinking – Reading – Writing on behalf of the Women's Representative of the Alice Salomon University of Applied Sciences. She has written numerous articles on gender/queer as well as social justice and diversity, the concept of being an ally and the Mahloquet dialogue method (dialogue-constructive debate) and presented their significance for individual areas of social work practice. Together with Perko, she developed two diversity concepts: "Radical Diversity" and "Discrimination-critical Diversity". Diversity is seen as a response to structural discrimination, which is understood as the interaction of individual, institutional and cultural practices that are interwoven and characterised by exploitation, violence, exclusion and marginalisation. Czollek has published various textbooks and manuals in the field of education and social professions.

== Publications ==
- Frauen in Gewaltverhältnissen, Dokumentation zur Tagung „Gewalt gegen Frauen". Alice-Salomon-Hochschule, Berlin 2002.
- Leah Carola Czollek, Gudrun Perko: Verständigung in finsteren Zeiten. Interkulturelle Dialoge statt „Clash of Civilizations". PapyRossa, Köln 2003, ISBN 3-89438-275-9.
- Leah Carola Czollek, Heike Weinbach: Was Sie schon immer über Gender wissen wollten... und über Sex nicht gefragt haben. Alice-Salomon-Hochschule, Berlin 2003, ISBN 3-930523-16-7.
- Leah Carola Czollek, Gudrun Perko: Lust am Denken. Queeres jenseits kultureller Verortungen. PapyRossa, Köln 2004, ISBN 3-89438-294-5.
- Leah Carola Czollek, Gudrun Perko, Heike Weinbach: Lehrbuch Gender und queer. Grundlagen, Methoden und Praxisfelder. Beltz Juventa, Weinheim 2009, ISBN 978-3-7799-2205-6.
- Leah Carola Czollek, Gudrun Perko, Heike Weinbach: Praxishandbuch Social Justice und Diversity. Theorien, Training, Methoden, Übungen. Beltz Juventa, Weinheim 2012, ISBN 978-3-7799-2822-5.
- Leah Carola Czollek, Gudrun Perko: Social Justice und Diversity Training: Intersektionalität als Diversitymodell und Strukturanalyse von Diskriminierung und Exklusion. Bergische Universität, Wuppertal 2012. (portal-intersektionalitaet.de)
- Leah Carola Czollek, Gudrun Perko, Corinne Kaszner, Max Czollek: Praxishandbuch Social Justice und Diversity: Theorien, Training, Methoden, Übungen. Überarbeitete und erweiterte Auflage. Beltz Juventa, Weinheim 2019, ISBN 978-3-7799-3845-3
