= Robert Kraft (disambiguation) =

Robert Kraft (born 1941) is an American business magnate.

Robert Kraft is also the name of:

- Robert Kraft (writer) (1869–1916), German detective and adventure novelist
- Robert Kraft (astronomer) (1927–2015), American astronomer
- Robert A. Kraft (1934–2023), American historian of religion
- Robert Kraft (composer), American songwriter, film composer, recording artist and record producer

== See also ==
- Robert Craft (1923–2015), American conductor
- The Raven (runner), an American runner born Robert Kraft
