= Marianna Salzmann =

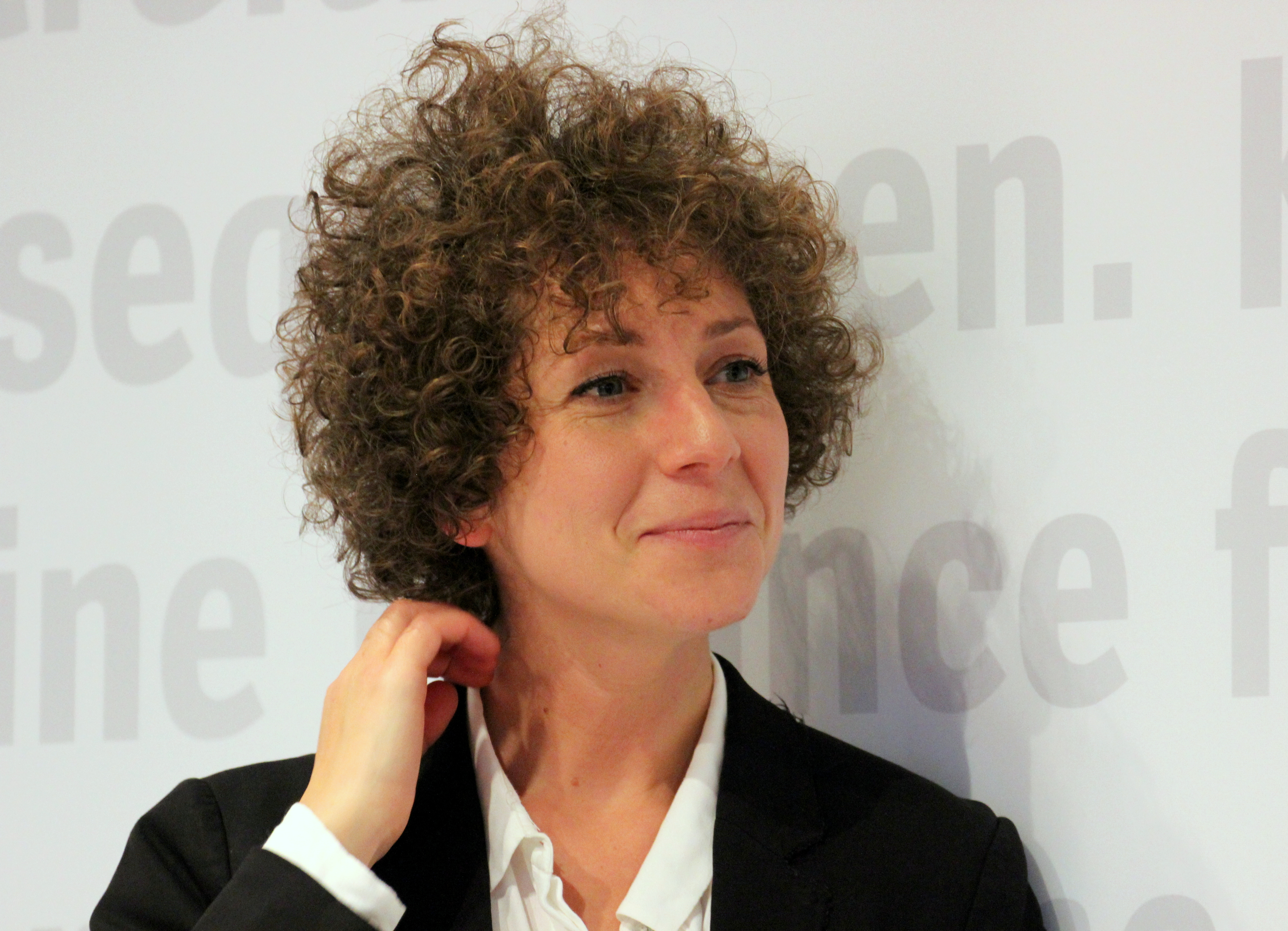
- "Саша"/"Sasha" Marianna Salzmann Heike Huslage-Koch, 2017
- Born: 21 August 1985 (age 41); Volgograd (Southern Russia), Soviet Union
- Education: University of Hildesheim; Berlin University of the Arts
- Occupations: dramatist essayist novelist
- Website: sashamariannasalzmann.com

Sasha Marianna Salzmann (born in Volgograd, Soviet Union on 21 August 1985) is a German playwright, essayist, theatre curator and novelist. They are a writer in residence at the Maxim Gorki Theatre in Berlin where they were artistic director of the studio theatre, Studio Я, from 2013 to 2015.

== Life ==
Salzmann grew up in Moscow until 1995, when they emigrated with their family to Germany as Jewish "Quota refugees" ("Kontingentflüchtlinge"). They studied literature, drama and media studies at the University of Hildesheim and creative writing for the stage at the Berlin University of the Arts.

== Theatre career ==
Throughout their studies in Hildesheim, they had poems and short stories published in various magazines, and, together with Deniz Ultu, Mutlu Ergün, Marcela Knapp and Mike Klesse, they founded the cultural and social magazine freitext, where they worked as editor from 2002 to 2013. Alongside their studies, they also staged two plays with Wera Mahne: Ein Attentat auf Godot ('An Attempt on Godot'), a loose adaptation of Beckett's classic, and Rot Werden ('Turning Red'), a sarcastic romantic monologue to Vladimir Putin. In collaboration with the music theatre collective forte blau, Salzmann developed projects for the deaf, hard of hearing and hearing. With Grenzkollektiv, they created a parody of the Joan of Arc story—Jeanne ist tot und kommt heute nicht mehr vorbei ('Joan's Dead and Won't be Coming Round Today').

During their studies in Berlin, Salzmann's first full-length play Weißbrotmusik (Engl.: "white bread music") won the Wiener Wortstaettenpreis 2009 and the IKARUS Prize for Best Youth Play 2012. In 2012, they were also awarded the Kleist Prize for Young Dramatists for their play Muttermale Fenster blau, and in 2013, their graduation play Muttersprache Mameloschn (Engl.: "mother tongue Mameloschn") won the Mülheim Audience Award for Play of the Year and was voted Best Play by theatre critics. In 2018, they were awarded the Nestroy Theatre Prize for best off production for that same play.

In 2014, they collaborated with Maxi Obexer in co-founding the NIDS, Neues Institut für Dramatisches Schreiben (Engl.: "New Institute for Writing for the Stage"), an institute whose purpose is to raise public awareness of the societal importance of the art of drama, and to strengthen a kind of art whose original function was to encourage a type of culture that encourages critical debates and discussions.

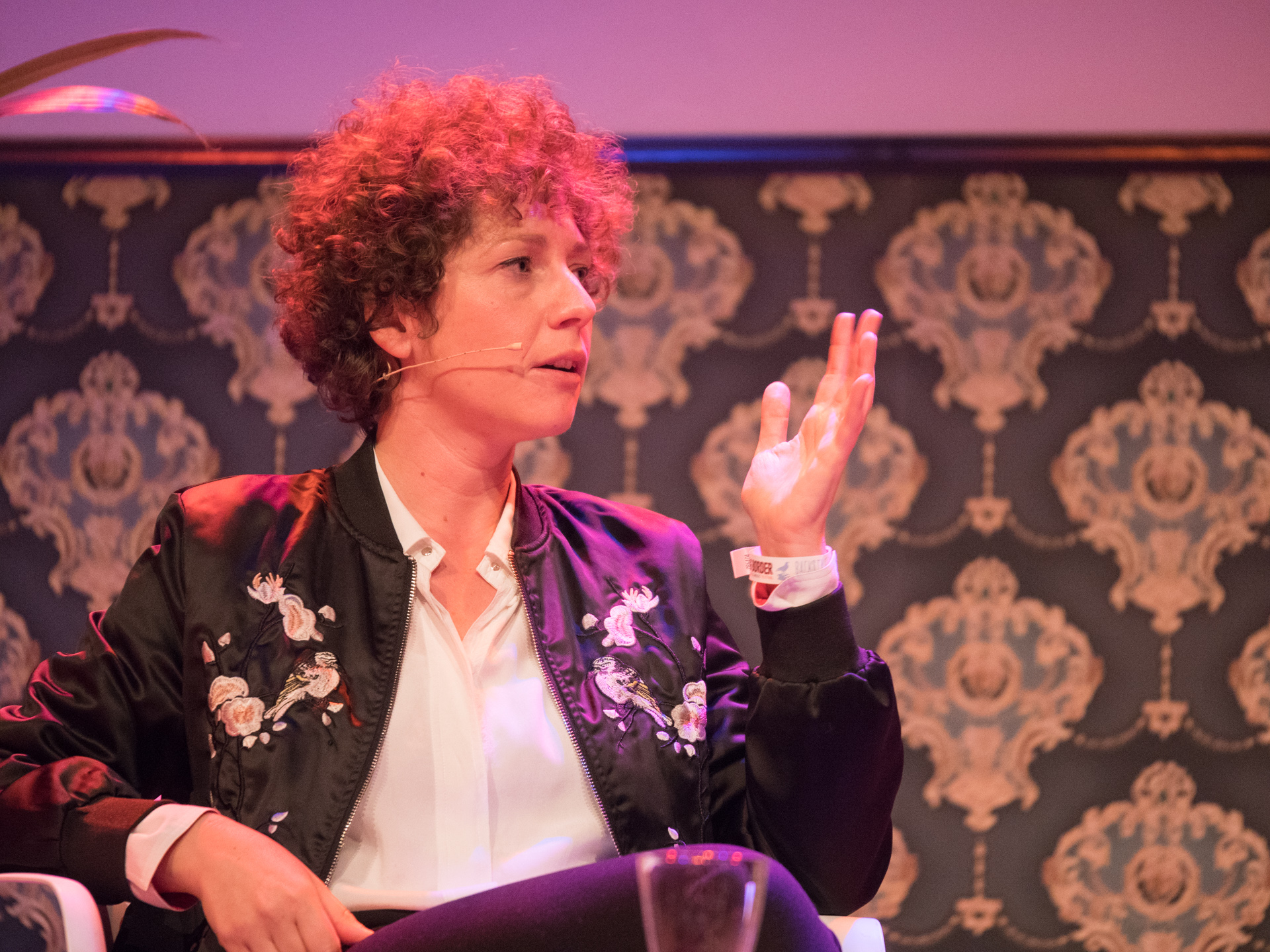
Sasha Marianna Salzmann at the Crossing Border Festival in Den Haag, 2018

Since 2013, Salzmann has been writer in residence at the Maxim Gorki Theatre Berlin, where they previously headed the Conflict Zone Arts Asylum collective at Studio Я, an "undernational network of artists, activists, authors, performers and curators who believe that aesthetics is the better ethics, art the better politics, language the most powerful force."

'The Maxim Gorki Theatre is the "Theatre of the Year",' Welt journalist Stefan Grund wrote. 'One reason is Sasha Marianna Salzmann who is director of the most exciting experimental theatre in Germany—Studio Я.' In 2016, the verdict of German theatre magazine Die Deutsche Bühne was equally enthusiastic: 'Salzmann, with their sensitive eye for the brutality of the present age and their biographical glimpses into the past, is perhaps the German-language dramatist of the moment' (Detlev Baur).

Together with Max Czollek, Salzmann curated the 'Disintegration Congress' (2016) and the 'Radical Jewish Culture Days' (2017), two social sculptures where international figures addressed questions of contemporary Jewish identity. 'The Maxim Gorki Theatre used to be a post-migrant theatre,' Dirk Pilz wrote in the Berliner Zeitung. 'Now it's a disintegration theatre. Disintegration means: I'm not joining in. The one thing it doesn't mean is: I'm keeping out of this.' As part of the Radical Jewish Culture Days, Salzmann directed Die Geschichte vom Leben und Sterben des neuen Juppi Ja Jey Juden ('The Life and Death of the New Yippee Yeah Yeah Jew'), a theatre monologue by Sivan Ben Yishai.

== Prose ==
During a residency at the Tarabaya Arts Academy in Istanbul in 2012/13, Salzmann began work on their debut novel, Beside Myself, which they finished writing on subsequent visits to Turkey. The novel was published by Suhrkamp in September 2017. It is about twins who grow up first in a small flat in post-Soviet Moscow and then in an asylum home in provincial West Germany and, at the same time, it is the story of a Jewish family over four generations. Salzmann was awarded the Jürgen Ponto Foundation Prize for Literature for their debut. The jury described Beside Myself as a 'daring and accomplished balancing act between cultural and gender identity' and 'a multifaceted panorama of generations from the Soviet Union of the twentieth century to present-day Europe.' The novel was also on the 2017 German Book Prize shortlist and in 2018 Salzmann won the Mara Cassens Prize for their 'deeply provocative debut novel'. Beside Myself has been translated into fifteen languages.

== Works (selection) ==
- Salzmann, Marianna (2021). Im Menschen muss alles herrlich sein. Roman (in German). Berlin: Suhrkamp Verlag. ISBN 978-3-518-43010-1. OCLC 1266337635.
- —— (2017). Außer sich. Roman (in German). Berlin: Suhrkamp Verlag. ISBN 978-3-518-42762-0. OCLC 984748672.

=== English translations ===
- Salzmann, Marianna; Taylor, Imogen (2019). Beside myself. New York: Other Press. ISBN 978-1-892746-44-3. OCLC 1110145818.

=== French translations ===
- Salzmann, Marianna; De Oliveira, Claire (2019). Hors de soi : roman (in French). Paris: Grasset. ISBN 978-2-246-81534-1. OCLC 1089433603.

=== Spanish translations ===
- Salzmann, Sasha Marianna (2020). Fuera de si (in Spanish). Barcelona: Seix Barral. ISBN 978-84-322-3611-2. OCLC 1158415493.
