= Horst Krüger =

German novelist

Horst Krüger (September 17, 1919 Magdeburg – October 21, 1999 Frankfurt am Main) was a German writer best known for his autobiography, The Broken House: Growing Up Under Hitler (original title Das Zerbrochene Haus. Eine Jugend in Deutschland or A Crack in the Wall: A Youth in Germany).

== Biography ==
Horst Krüger was born in Magdeburg, and grew up in Berlin. He studied philosophy and literature at the Humboldt University of Berlin and the University of Freiburg. From 1952 to 1967 he ran a literature program on a Baden-Baden radio-station. After 1967 he lived in Frankfurt am Main working as a freelance writer. He wrote travel stories, which often took an ethnographic-perspective and dispensed with the style current in feuilletons. Running themes in Krüger's work were Germany's Nazi past and its aftermath, the partition of Germany and his own youth in Berlin-Eichkamp.

Krüger was a member of the German Academy for Language and Poetry and PEN.
