= Walter Czollek =

- Born: 8 April 1907; Charlottenburg, Berlin, Germany
- Died: 23 April 1972 (aged 65); East Germany
- Occupations: Publisher, Communist activist
- Years active: 1950–1972
- Employer: Verlag Volk und Welt
- Known for: Head of Verlag Volk und Welt (1954–1972)
- Political party: Communist Party of Germany (KPD)
- Relatives: Max Czollek (grandson)

Walter Czollek (8 April 1907 – 23 April 1972) was the head of the East German publishing house Verlag Volk und Welt between 1954 and 1972.

In 1929, as a young man, he joined the Communist Party. He was detained in a succession of prisons and concentration camps between 1933 and 1939, at which point he was deprived of his citizenship. By 1939 it was no longer so easy as it had been earlier in the decade for Germany's political refugees to find refuge elsewhere in Europe, but he was able to emigrate to China where he supported himself with journalistic and translation work between 1939 and 1947.

== Life ==
Walter Czollek was born in the Charlottenburg quarter of Berlin into a German-Jewish family. His father was a businessman. He had a conventional schooling, attending a Gymnasium (secondary school) locally and successfully completing his School final exams ("Abitur"). However, instead of progressing directly to university, in 1924 he embarked on a commercial apprenticeship, mastering the production and processing of artificial silk fabrics. He continued to work in the business till 1933.

Between 1928 and 1930 he also undertook a study course in Applied Economics ("Volkswirtschaft") at the German Academy of Politics in Berlin-Schöneberg. It was during this time, in 1929, that he joined the Communist Party. He worked secretly in the party's quasi-military "M-Apparat" ("Militärpolitischen Apparat" / "Military-political structure") between 1929 and 1933.

Régime change in January 1933, followed by the Reichstag fire in February 1933, signalled a rapid transition to one-party dictatorship. Those who were or had been active Communist Party members found themselves at the top of the government's target list, and many escaped arrest only by fleeing abroad, mostly (in the early years) to Prague, Paris and Moscow. During 1933/34 Walter Czollek was arrested twice. In 1934 he was sentenced to two years in prison. He served his sentence at the penitentiaries in Berlin's Prince Albrecht Street and Luckau, before being transferred, in 1936, to Lichtenburg concentration camp. He was moved to Dachau concentration camp in 1937, and in 1938 to Buchenwald concentration camp where he was held, mostly, in isolation and subjected to serious mistreatment.

He was eventually released and expelled from Germany in May 1939. He arrived in Shanghai on 17 July 1939, and met by Max Lewinsohn and Alfred Dreifuss. Czollek was found a room in an apartment in Ward Road. Through Dreifuss he was introduced to Richard Paulick who operated what amounted to a "political salon" at the heart of a small but committed community of exiled German communists. Between 1939 and 1941 he headed up an illegal radio station on behalf of the Chinese Communist Party, also carrying out tasks for a Soviet news and information service, while also supporting himself by working in various chemicals companies. Up till 1945 he was passing military information to various news agencies. Between 1939 and 1947 he also worked as a translator and radio presenter for the German language TASS station "Voice of the Soviet Union in Shanghai" ("Stimme der Sowjetunion in Shanghai"). Czollek was a co-founder and later a leader of the Communist Party of Germany exile group in China, and after the war in Europe ended, in November 1945 he was a co-founder of the "Residents Association of Democratic Germans" in Shanghai.

In August 1947 Walter Czollek returned from Shanghai to the part of Germany which, since May 1945, had been administered as the Soviet occupation zone of what had previously been Germany. He took a job with the "Treuhandverwaltung", responsible for administering confiscated and sequestered property in the Soviet (eastern) part of Berlin. In 1948/49 he took a senior position with the personnel office of the Berlin Chamber of Industry and Commerce. During this time, in October 1949, the Soviet occupation zone was relaunched as the German Democratic Republic, a new kind of German one-party dictatorship, sponsored by the Soviet Union, and with its defining social and political structures modelled on those of the Soviet Union itself. Between 1950 and 1952 he was employed by the Verlag Volk und Welt (publishing house) as a reader on the then crucially important subject of contemporary history.

During 1952 he attended a course at the party's "Walter Ulbricht" Academy for National Administration ("... Akademie für Staats- und Rechtswissenschaft"), after which he became deputy head of the "Verlag Volk und Welt". In 1954 he succeeded Bruno Peterson as head ("Verlagsleiter") of the operation, a position he retained for eighteen years till his death in 1972.

== Family ==
Walter Czollek's grandson, Max Czollek, has achieved a certain notability as a lyricist and stage performer.

== Honour ==
- 1967 Patriotic Order of Merit in silver
