= Margareth Obexer =

German-Italian writer

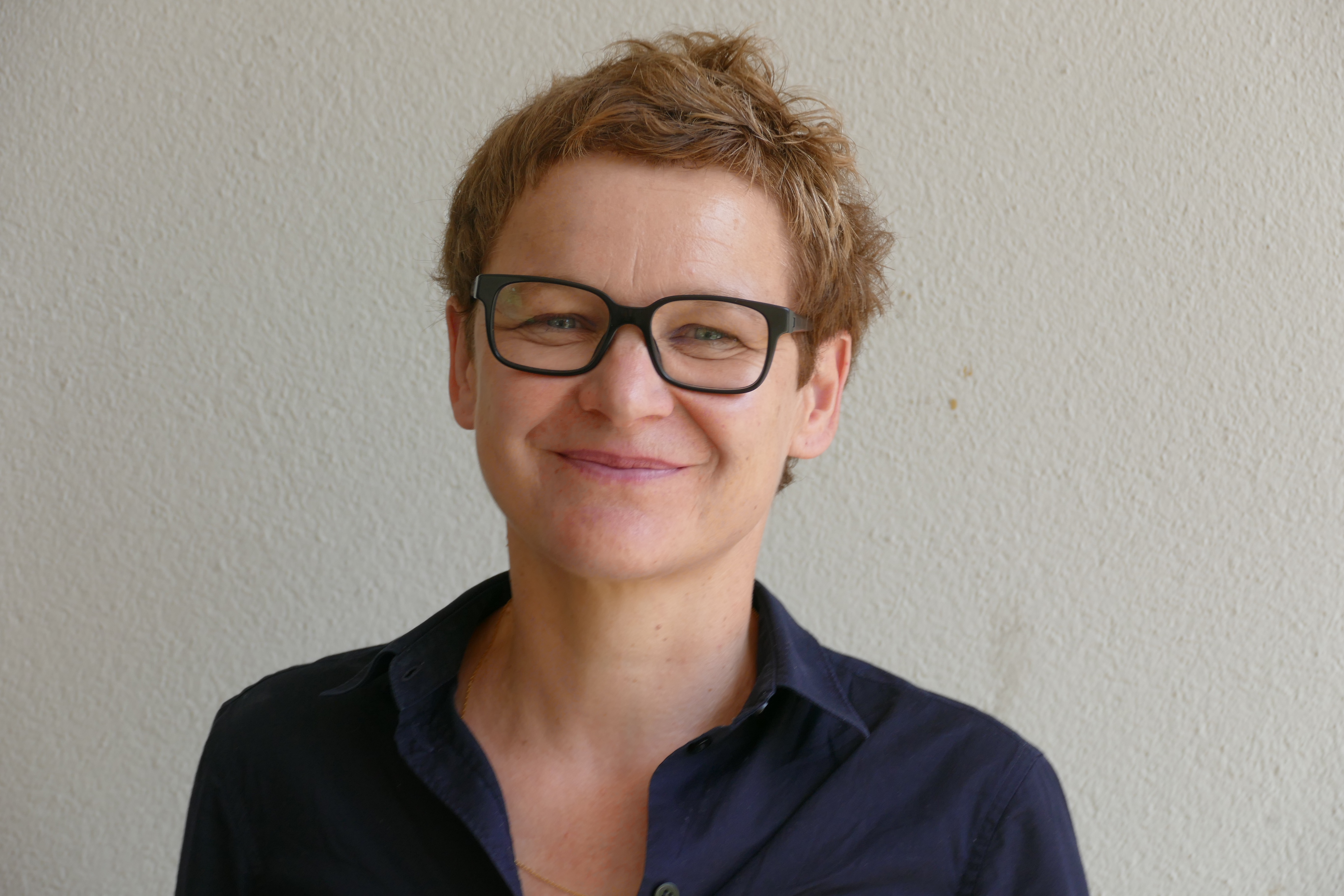
Obexer in 2017

Margareth "Maxi" Obexer is a German-Italian writer, originally from South Tyrol in northern Italy. She is a freelance author, focusing on theatre works, novels, radio dramas, essays, and other narrative pieces.

== Life ==
Margareth Obexer was born in Brixen, South Tyrol. She was born into a German-speaking family. She attended school in Bolzano, a short distance to the south of Brixen, where she also mastered Italian. She has subsequently relocated to Berlin and, more recently, taken German citizenship. She has come to prominence increasingly on account of the political nature of her plays, audio plays, and essays.

She studied general and comparative literature, philosophy, and theatre studies in Vienna and Berlin. While she was still a student, her prose works, stage plays, and radio dramas attracted commendation. One consequence of that was stipendiums received from both the Literary Colloquium in Berlin and the city's Academy of Arts. Later, in 2004, and again in 2007, she spent time as a stipendiate at the Akademie Schloss Solitude in Stuttgart. In 1994, she became a fellow of the Literary Colloquium. In 2009, she took a guest professorship at Dartmouth College in New Hampshire, followed between 2009 and 2011 by a similar appointment at the Berlin University of the Arts.

In 2014, Obexer teamed up with Marianna Salzmann to establish the "New Institute for Stage Writing" ("Neue Institut für Dramatisches Schreiben"), with the objective of bringing the social significance of dramatic art back more strongly into public consciousness, and "to strengthen an art-form that exists, in the first instance, to develop a culture of debate". Her 2015 radio and stage plays "Illegale Helfer" won the "Eurodrama" and Robert Geisendörfer prizes in 2016.

== Works (selection) ==
- Die Kämpfe der Frauen, stage drama, schaefersphilippen 2012
- Wenn gefährliche Hunde lachen, novel. Folio 2011
- Von der Notwendigkeit der Kunst, Essays. Akademie Solitude, Stuttgart 2010
- Das Geisterschiff, stage drama, UA Jena 2007, München 2009, Theater Basel 2010, WDR 2006
- Gletscher, Wien 2006, Stuttgart 2008, Innsbruck 2010
- Lotzer. Eine Revolution, stage drama. Landestheater Schwaben 2009
- Defending Europe, Manifesta 2008
- Der Zwilling, Staatstheater Dresden 2006
- Von Kopf bis Fuß, stage drama, Städtische Bühnen Osnabrück 2004
- Liberté Toujours, Sophiensäle Berlin, Stuttgart 2004, NDR 2009
- Das Herz eines Bastards, Erzählungen, Athesia 2002
- Gelbsucht, stage drama, Berlin 2000
- Die Liebenden, stage drama, LTT Tübingen/Stuttgart 04
- Illegale Helfer, stage drama und Hörspiel, 2016
- Gehen und Bleiben, stage drama, 2017
- Europas längster Sommer. essay-novella. Verbrecher, Berlin 2017. ISBN 978-3-95732-271-5.

== Radio dramas ==
- 1999 Die Liebenden, director: Claudia Johanna Leist (WDR)
- 2005 Hidden See, director: the author (WDR)
- 2006 Das Geisterschiff, director: Martin Zylka (WDR)
- 2006 Liberté toujours, director: Anouschka Trocker
- 2008 F.O.B. – Free on Board, director: Anouschka Trocker
- 2011 Gletscher, director: Barbara Plensat
- 2018 Europas längster Sommer, director: Gerrit Booms, ca. 30 min., (WDR)
