= Theodor Piderit =

German writer (1826–1912)

- Born: September 15, 1826; Detmold
- Died: January 24, 1912 (aged 85); Detmold

Theodor Piderit (15 September 1826 – 24 January 1912) was a German writer and doctor from Detmold. His work on physiognomy was frequently cited by Charles Darwin.

== Life ==
Piderit studied medicine in Göttingen, Heidelberg and Berlin from 1846. Since 1847, he was a member of the student fraternity, Corps Saxonia Göttingen. Driven out by the political situation during the Vormärz period, Piderit went to Valparaíso in the autumn of 1850, where he practiced medicine for 14 years. During his time in Chile, Piderit carries preconceptions about the cultural superiority of Germanness. He holds disdain for his brother, who settles in New Orleans and prefers to speak English over German. His letters to his father from Valparaíso, transcribed from Sütterlin script, complete his portrait of the young doctor abroad in the period after the March Revolution. These letters also clarify why he returned to his hometown of Detmold with his wife and children in 1863. On 11 March 1856, he became an honorary member of the Naturwissenschaftlichen Vereins für das Fürstentum Lippe (transl. Natural Science Society for the Principality of Lippe) in Detmold. After moving back to Detmold, and then Bielefeld, he worked as a writer.

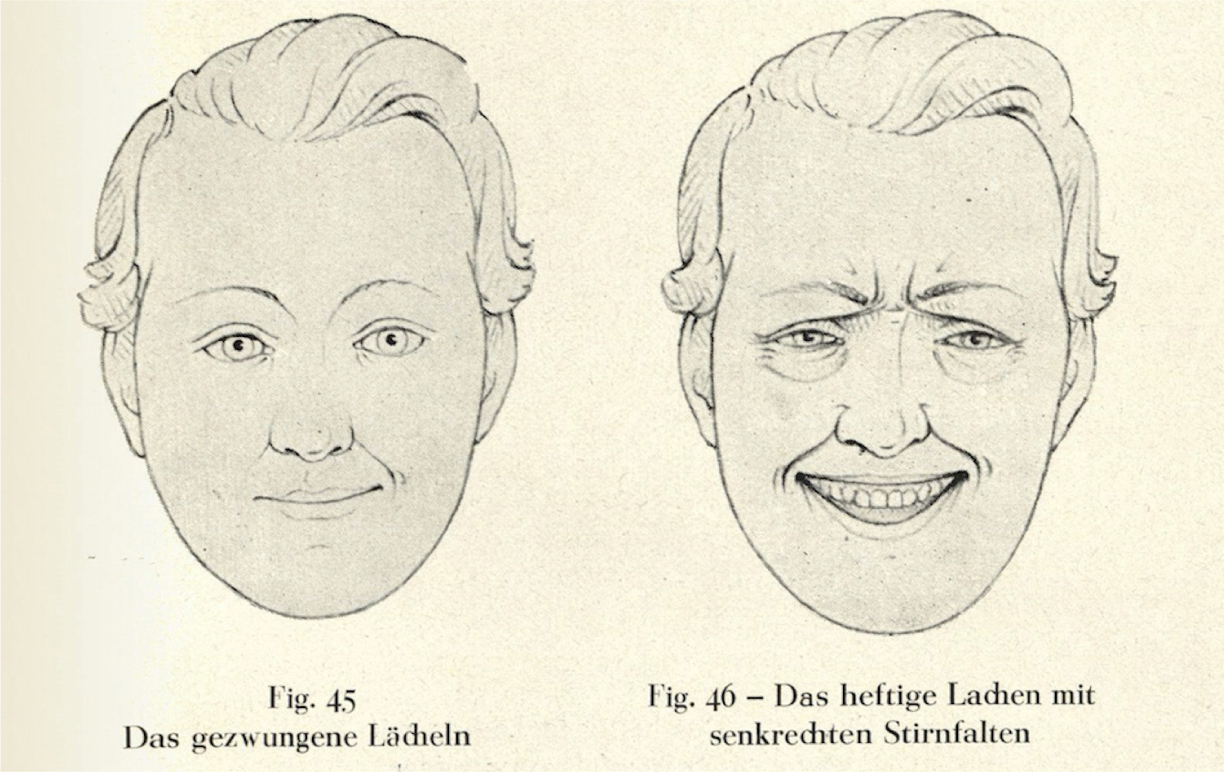
Illustrations from Theodor Piderit’s Mimik und Physiognomik (1886)

His work on physiognomy, in particular Wissenschaftliches System der Mimik und Physiognomik (transl. Scientific system of facial expressions and physiognomy, 1867), was frequently cited by Charles Darwin. They corresponded in 1871.

Piederit wrote several accounts of his journey and time as a practicing physician in Valparaíso, including his diary-style books: Von Bremerhafen nach Valparaiso. 21. September 1850 – 15. Januar 1851 (transl. From Bremerhaven to Valparaíso. September 21, 1850 – January 15, 1851) and Erlebtes und Erdachtes aus alter und neuer Zeit (transl. Experiences and Thoughts from Old and New Times). In the latter, he recounts his journey via Panama, New Orleans, Baltimore, and Boston, culminating in a stopover in his hometown of Detmold (later Bielefeld), where he married Anna Rose in 1860. The painter Theodor Mintrop captured this relationship in his drawings, Das Album für Minna.

== Personal life ==
Theodor Piderit met Anna Rose (1839–1886) in July 1860. They married later that year on 1 September. Their youngest daughter was Anna Piderit (1874–1956).
