= Stefan Beuse =

German writer

Stefan Beuse (born 31 January 1967 in Münster) is a German writer and journalist. After completing his Abitur, he worked for several major publications, including Die Zeit and Die Welt. He has published numerous works of fiction and non-fiction since 1997—including novels such as Kometen (2000), Die Nacht der Könige (2002), and Meeres Stille (2003), as well as the literary portrait Gebrauchsanweisung für Hamburg (2001)—and has received several literary awards, notably the Literaturförderpreis der Stadt Hamburg.

== Biography ==
After Abitur, he worked for several publications like Die Zeit or Die Welt. He has won several literature prices like Literaturförderpreis der Stadt Hamburg.

He lives with his family in Hamburg.

== Works ==
- Wir schießen Gummibänder zu den Sternen, Leipzig: Reclam 1997
- Kometen, Köln: Kiepenheuer und Witsch 2000
- Gebrauchsanweisung für Hamburg, München: Piper 2001
- Die Nacht der Könige, München: Piper 2002
- Meeres Stille, München: Piper 2003
- Lautlos – sein letzter Auftrag, Frankfurt am Main: Fischer-Taschenbuch-Verlag 2004
- Alles was du siehst, München: Beck 2009
