= Hans von Zwiedineck-Südenhorst =

German historian

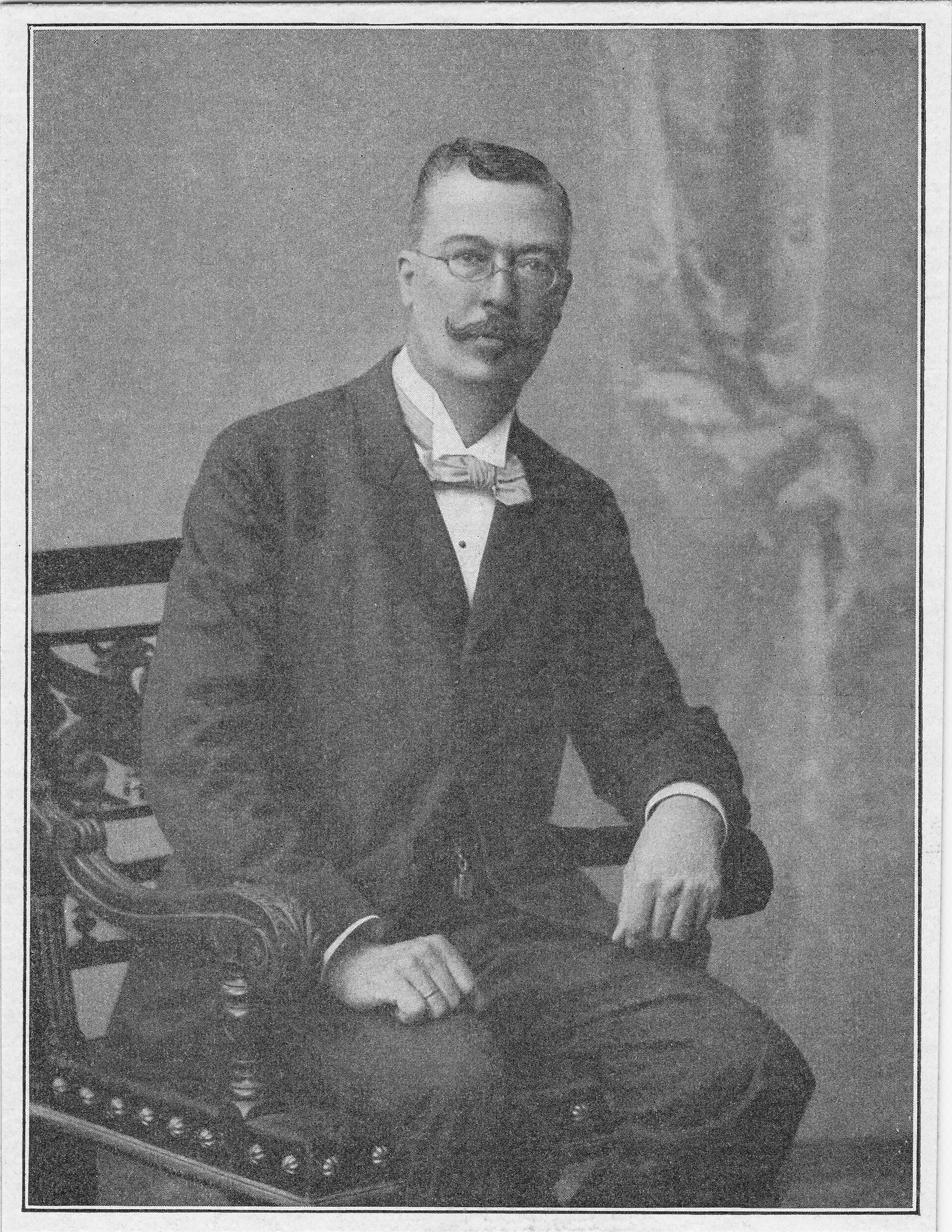
Hans von Zwiedineck-Südenhorst

Hans von Zwiedineck-Südenhorst (German pronunciation: [ˈt͜sviːdinɛk ˈzyːdn̩hɔʁst]; 14 April 1845 – 22 November 1906) was a German historian.

He was born in Frankfurt am Main and studied at the University of Graz, where he became a professor in 1885. He died in Graz.

Südenhorst's principal writings are:

- Dorfleben im 18. Jahrhundert [Village Life in the eighteenth century] (Vienna, 1877);
- Hans Ulrich, Fürst van Eggenberg [Hans Ulrich, Prince of Eggenberg](Vienna, 1880);
- Die Politik der Republic Venedig während des dreissigjährigen Krieges [The policy of the Venetian Republic during the Thirty Years' War](Stuttgart, 1882–85);
- Venedig als Weltmacht und Weltstadt (Bielefeld, 1899 and 1906);
- Kriegsbilder aus der Zeit der Landsknechte (Stuttgart, 1883);
- Die öffentliche Meinung in Deutschland im Zeitalter Ludwigs XIV. 1650-1700 (Stuttgart, 1888);
- Erzherzog Johann im Feldzuge von 1809 (Gratz, 1892);
- Maria Theresia (Bielefeld, 1905).

He also edited the Bibliothek deutscher Geschichte, writing for this series, Deutsche Geschichte im Zeitalter der Gründung des preussischen Königtums (Stuttgart, 1887–94); and Deutsche Geschichte von der Auflösung des alten bis zur Gründung des neuen Reiches (Stuttgart, 1897-1905). He completed A. Wolf's Oesterreich unter Maria Theresia, Josef II. und Leopold, II. (Berlin, 1882–84), and edited the Zeitschrift für allgemeine Geschichte (Stuttgart, 1884–88).
