= Wilhelm Bauberger =

German physician, novelist and poet

Wilhelm Bauberger (March 3, 1809 – February 8, 1883) was a German medical doctor, novelist and poet, author of Die Beatushöhle.

Bauberger was born at Thannhausen in Swabian Bavaria. As a physician he was greatly esteemed for his skill, but more so for his kindliness of manner. His fame rests chiefly, however, on his tales. The earliest of these, "Die Beatushöhle", written at the age of nineteen, while the author was still a medical student, met with such extraordinary success among all classes of readers that Bauberger published all his subsequent tales as by the author of "Die Beatushohle". He drew his most successful themes from history and legend. His recognized model for the spirit and tone of his stories was Christoph Schmid.

Bauberger also essayed lyrical and dramatic compositions, but with indifferent success, for, along with much that is strong and beautiful, his verse contains more that is feeble and commonplace. His fame as a writer suffered no permanent eclipse from the inferiority of his poetry, for new tales, exhibiting all the charm of his early work, constantly appeared to redeem his dramatic failures or half-successes. Bauberger's literary activity continued unabated until his death. A list of his works printed during his lifetime is found in Kehrein's "Lexicon der kath. Dichter, Volks- und Jugendschriftsteller im 19ten Jahrhundert" (1872), I, 13, and a complete list of his posthumous works in the "Allgemeine deutsche Biographie", XLVI, 232 sqq. He died at Thannhausen February 8, 1883.
