= Gerhard Amendt =

German sociologist, and was Professor

Gerhard Amendt (born June 8, 1939, in Frankfurt am Main) is a German sociologist, and was Professor at Bremen University, in the Research Institute for Gender and Generation until his retirement in 2003.

== Career ==
Amendt studied sociology in Frankfurt am Main and in London. During his studies he was involved in the Socialist German Student League. Amendt published books and essays on the welfare of children and abortion. In an article in Die Welt, he argued that domestic violence is initiated equally often by both members of the couple, and proposed that specialized counseling centers for families with unresolved violent conflicts should replace "women's shelter". He is regarded as a key figure and intellectual leader in the Men's rights movement.

Gerhard Amendt is the twin brother of Günter Amendt.

== Selected bibliography ==
- 2008 "I did not divorce my kids!" How Fathers Deal with Family Break-Ups, ISBN 978-3-593-38546-4.
- 1994 How mothers see their sons
- 1992 The life of unwanted children
