= Charlotte von Hezel =

German journalist, editor

Charlotte von Hezel, also known as Charlotte Henriette Hezel (née Schwabe; 8 January 1755, in Ilmenau, Saxe-Weimar – 3 April 1817, in Dorpat) was a German writer, editor and journalist. She was the first woman to publish a magazine under her own name, the Wochenblatt für's Schöne Geschlecht (English: "The Weekly Newspaper for the Fair Sex"). It was the first women's magazine to address topics like diets and popular science. It also covered art, artists and new writing. Its demise was blamed on unreliable postal delivery. She also founded a women's reading society where "... where no hint of a male nation should touch the room ...."

== Life and work ==
Charlotte von Hezel was the only daughter of four children of the pastor and assistant superintendent of schools, Johann Wilhelm Schwabe and his wife Dorothea Crusius, a "talented Gelegenheitsdichterin (occasional poet)".

She received a literary and musical education at home. Her three brothers were university-educated and worked as ministers, lawyers and doctors. Charlotte was mainly taught by her brother Heinrich Elias.

On 14 June 1778, she married the private tutor and linguistic scholar Johann Wilhelm Friedrich von Hezel. The couple initially lived near Ilmenau where Johann, who had been appointed imperial palatine, completed seven volumes of his Bible treatise with the help of his wife. Their sons had two sons and two daughters. Son Johann Karl Wilhelm Friedrich von Hezel (1786–1831) completed a degree in philosophy and worked as a lawyer; the names and resumes of the other children are not known.

In 1779, Charlotte published her periodical, Wochenblatt für's Schöne Geschlecht, in Ilmenau. She was the first woman to publish a magazine under her own name – four years before Sophie von La Roche with her Pomona: Für Teutschlands Töchter (English: Pomona: For Germany's Daughters). With the publication of this weekly, Charlotte made a name for herself with the literary public and was considered a literary and politically ambitious writer and editor.

In 1786, her husband accepted an appointment as a "professor of exegesis and oriental literature" in Giessen, where the Hezel family lived until 1801. During this period, Charlotte and other wives of University of Giessen lecturers founded the Women's Reading Society. In 1801 the von Hezel family moved to Dorpat after Johann accepted a job there.

== Weekly Paper for the Fair Sex ==
Women's magazines gradually became popular at the beginning of the 18th century (The world's first women's magazine "The Ladies' Mercury" appeared in 1693). Initially, they were published by men, until in 1779 a Hamburg woman, Ernestine Hofmann – anonymously – was the first woman to put out a publication for Hamburg's females, but hid "behind the fictitious authority of a wise old ... counselor and woman's friend".

Wochenblatt für's Schöne Geschlecht followed Hofmann that same year, also anonymously, but was open that Charlotte was a woman, and gave clear indications about her identity. She not only dealt with topics such as fashion and housekeeping, but also, contributing to the education of women, published content on art, history, literature, medicine and other scientific topics.

The magazine was published on Wednesdays and Saturdays, with an eight-page folio. The issues were mainly devoted to art and artist stories, and also explored new ideas. Charlotte sought to convey weekly newspaper-style information that went beyond the area of family life as well as contemporary women's activity, which was then largely limited to home and family.

The title page often featured a gloss or a poem. In the first edition, Charlotte published one of her own poems. For the first time a weekly offered a series of articles dealing with women's diet (Frauenzimmer-Diätetik) from a popular medical point of view. According to the editor, these were written by a doctor, who did remain unnamed. It was speculated that it was Charlotte's brother, Ernst Schwabe, a medical professor in Giessen.

Another section contained popular scientific treatises, for example: About the Age of Sealing Wax or Spanish Waxes or History of the Engraving Art. The magazine did not publish fiction.

The weekly lasted for only eight months, and, according to Charlotte, did not close due to a lack of subscribers, but because the then unreliable postal distribution channels caused too many difficulties. In her last editorial, she made known her displeasure with the Nuremberg post office Oberpostdirektion and the difficulties and delays in public postal delivery.

Wochenblatt für's Schöne Geschlecht had 163 subscribers, both men and women.

== Women's Reading Society ==
In 1786, Charlotte von Hezel and other wives of Giessen university professors founded a women's reading society, using her friendship with the scholar Christoph Gottlieb von Murr in which men were denied access by rule ("... where no hint of a male nation should touch the room ...."). The founders cooperated with the bookseller Friedrich Justus Krieger who created the organizational structure, including physical premises and the book and journal collection. Only the participants decided on the membership and composition of their library – a novelty at that time.

With Charlotte's departure, Christiane Crome, the sister of August Wilhelm Crome, professor of photography science in Giessen, continued the reading circle, whose fate is unknown.
