= J. J. Lynx =

Joachim Joe Lynx (27 September 1898 - 1969) was a German journalist and author of several books on disparate subjects. In the 1920s he worked as a correspondent in Vienna, where he gathered material that he would later expand into books, The Prince of Thieves: A Biography of George Manolesco and The Great Hohenzollern Scandal. Of Jewish descent, he moved to England sometime in the 1930s, and stayed there for the rest of his life.

In 1943 he began work on a collection of essays, The Future of the Jews, planned for the first part of 1944. When it was finally published in mid-1945, it included an introduction by Thomas Mann, "A Message" from Edvard Beneš, and a dozen essays by contributors both Jewish and Gentile.

Lynx solicited an essay from Dorothy L. Sayers, the detective novelist and Christian apologist. Her work (actually, the second version she wrote) was accepted and got as far as galley proofs, but was then removed by demand of other contributors, under circumstances that are debatable. It has never been published.

After the Second World War Lynx published The Pen Is Mightier, a collection of cartoons from the war. At least one of the cartoons shows a great affection for the English and their endurance in the war.

His last work appears to have been The Great Hohenzollern Scandal (1965).

== Sources ==
Almost nothing is known of Lynx's life or family; the main source of information is booksellers' listings and the covers of his books.

== Bibliography ==
- The Future of the Jews: A Symposium, Lindsay Drummond, London, 1945.
- The Pen Is Mightier Than the Sword: The Story of the War in Cartoons, Lindsay Drummond, London, 1946. (Also a Dutch edition)
- The Film Fan's Bedside Book, Co-Ordination Press, London, 1948.
- The Film Fan's Bedside Book No. 2, Co-Ordination Press, London, 1949.
- Patent Applied For: A Century of Fantastic Inventions, Co-Ordination Press, London, 1949.
- Die Historische "Ente", Hannover Fackelträger-Verlag 1960.
- The Prince of Thieves: A Biography of George Manolesco, Cassell, London, 1963. (Also in German)
- The Great Hohenzollern Scandal: A Biography of Alexander Zubrov, Oldbourne, London, 1965. (Also in Dutch)
