= Johannes Fiebag =

German writer

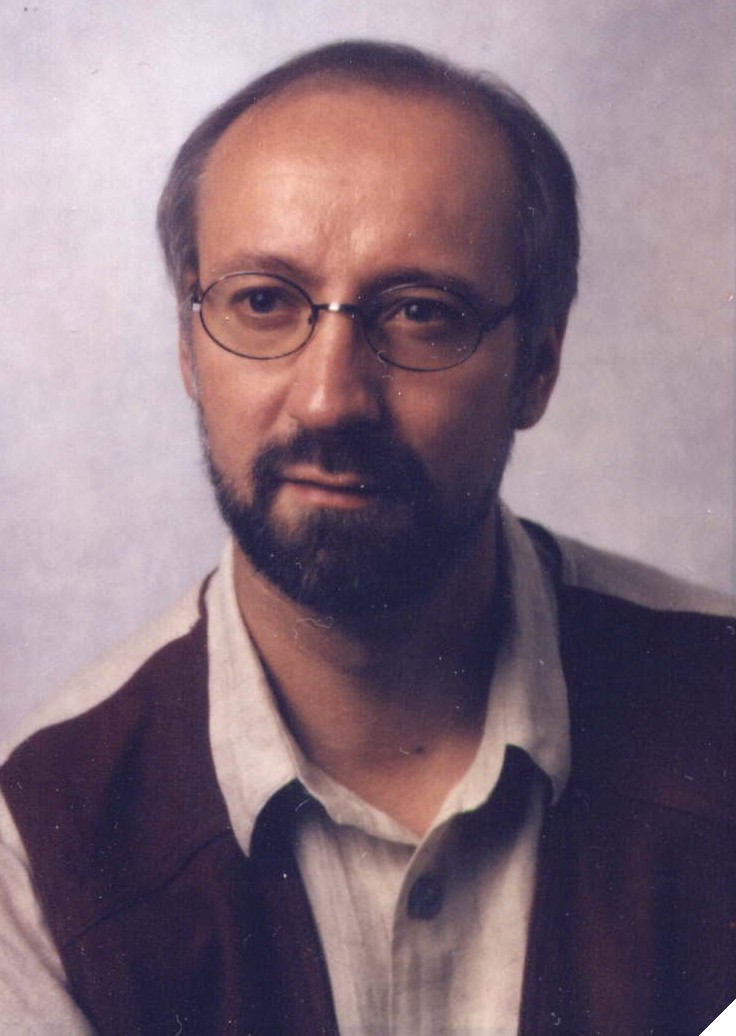
Johannes Fiebag

Johannes Fiebag (1956–1999) was a German writer.
