= Amalie Baisch =

German writer (born 1859)

Amalie Baisch (born Amalie Marggraff)
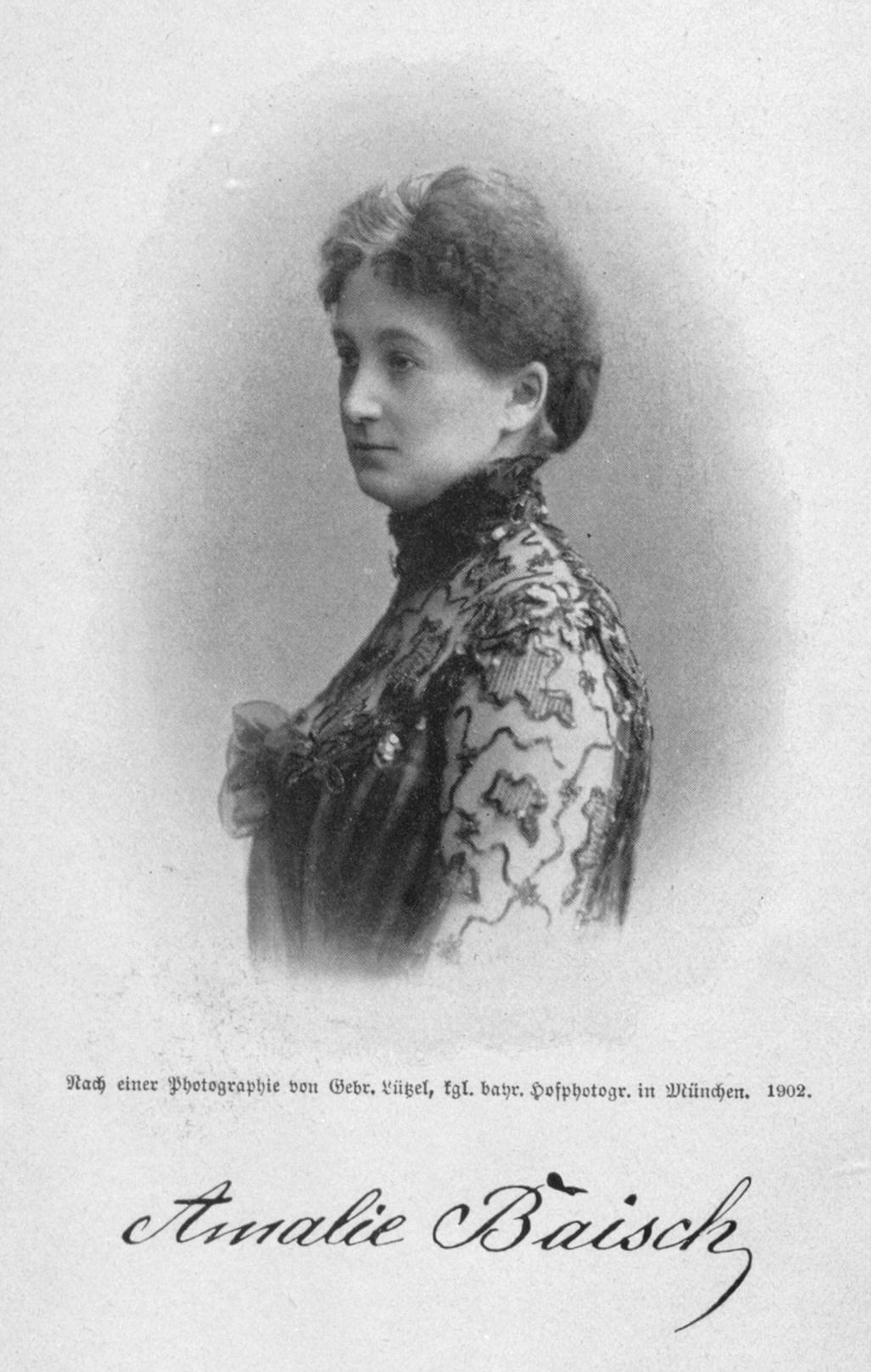
- Photo of Baisch from 1890
- Born: 8 October 1859; Munich
- Died: after 1904
- Occupation: Writer

Amalie Baisch (née Marggraff; 8 October 1859 in Munich – after 1904) was a German writer, best known for her Victorian era guide books on young women's etiquette. She wrote under the pseudonym Ernesta.

== Life ==
Amalie Baisch was born in Munich, Kingdom of Bavaria, on 8 October 1859. Her father was Rudolf Marggraff, a professor of Art History and Fine Art at the Academy of Fine Arts, Munich. Her mother was called Elisabeth Marggraff. Amalie Basch attended the Gymnasium Max-Josef-Stift and subsequently took a job as a teacher in Paris. She was a guest in the Parisian salons and travelled extensively. She documented her experiences in a series of literary sketches.

In 1885, Baisch married the author Otto Baisch (1840–1892). Otto had known Rudolf Marggraff since the 1870s. Before his death, Marggraff had been working on a biography of Johann Christian Reinhart, which Otto completed as published in 1882 under the title Johann Christian Reinhart und seine Kreise.

One year before their marriage, Otto took up the position of editor-in-chief of the illustrated magazine Über Land und Meer in Stuttgart, and thus the pair relocated there. Amalie found a stimulating cultural atmosphere in Stuttgart. In 1886, Baisch gave birth to a son, Hermann Baisch.

From 1886 the family lived in a rented flat at 123 Neckarstraße, in the building of the Deutsche Verlags-Anstalt, the publishers of Über Land und Meer. After the death of Otto Baisch in 1892, Amalie and her son moved to 31 Kernerstraße for a year, before moving back to Munich, were they lived in 14 Barerstraße. Amalie Baisch later remarried to a Major Florian Gassner.

== Work ==
Amalie Baisch's books had a target audience of young women and were predominantly advice books. Below is a selection of her works:

- Aus der Töchterschule ins Leben. Ein allseitiger Berater für Deutschlands Jungfrauen, 1889
- Die kleiner Feuerwehr, 1892
- Der Mutter Tagebuch. Aufzeichnungen über die ersten Lebensjahre ihres Kindes, 1893
- Das junge Mädchen auf eigenen Füßen. Ein Führer durch das weibliche Berufsleben, 1902
- Hilde Stirner. Eine Jungmädchenerzählung, 1909
