= Renate Feyl =

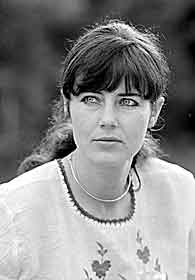
Renate Feyl in 1975 (photograph, Guenter Prust)

Renate Feyl (born 30 July 1944) is a Prague-born writer living in Germany.

Born in Prague (at that time Protectorate of Bohemia and Moravia), she grew up in Jena and went on to study philosophy at Humboldt University. Since 1970, Feyl has lived in Berlin working as a freelance writer.

== Selected works ==
Sources:

- Bau mir eine Brücke, novel (1972)
- Der lautlose Aufbruch, essays (1981)
- Idylle mit Professor, novel (1986)
- Sein ist das Weib, Denken der Mann, essay (1991)
- Ausharren im Paradies, novel (1992)
- Die profanen Stunden des Glücks (1996)
- Das sanfte Joch der Vortrefflichkeit (1999)
- Aussicht auf bleibende Helle (2006)
