= Uwe Reimer =

German writer (1948–2004)

Uwe Reimer (16 February 1948 – 23 February 2004) was a German writer who wrote numerous books about history and social studies.

== Biography ==
Reimer was born in 1948 in Hamburg. He visited the "Gymnasium Altona" which he finished in 1967. He studied history and philosophy at LMU Munich, where he first met his later co-author Lutz Tornow, with whom he was connected in friendship till the end of his life. Uwe Reimer received a doctor's degree in 1978.

His first book publication in two volumes, Alltag unterm Hakenkreuz (1980), was criticised of being too uncritical. His following works earned little attention, until he had a big success with Die USA (1992) in collaboration with Lutz Tornow.

For health-related reasons he backed off into family life with his wife and his two children and kept only little writing activity. Uwe Reimer died in 2004 in Göttingen.

== Literature ==
(selection)

- Alltag unterm Hakenkreuz and
- Alltag unterm Hakenkreuz II. Alltag der Entrechteten., Rowohlt, 1980, ISBN 3-499-14625-8
- Die USA (with Lutz Tornow), Diesterweg, 1992, ISBN 3-425-03258-5
