= Ottilie Bach =

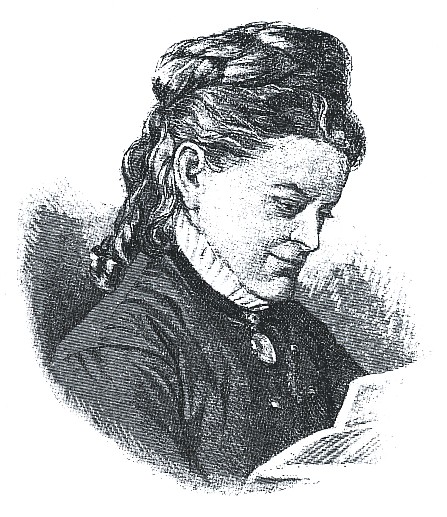
- Born: 6 July 1836; Hirschberg, Silesia, Kingdom of Prussia
- Died: 27 May 1905 (aged 68); Berlin, German Empire
- Occupation: Writer
- Writing career
- Pen name: O. Bach, Otto Ulrichs
- Language: German
- Years active: 1872–1905
- Notable work: Ein Ehejoch

Ottilie Bach (6 July 1836 – 27 May 1905) was a German writer. She also wrote under the pseudonym O. Bach and Otto Ulrichs.

== Life ==
Ottilie Bach was born in Hirschberg, Kingdom of Prussia (now Jelenia Góra, Poland), and moved to Berlin at the age of 5. She worked near Berlin, in Prague and in Hungary, where she wrote her first novel, Ein Ehejoch, in 1872. She then wrote several other stories.

== Works ==
- Ein Ehejoch (1872)
- Eine Klosterkabale. (1872)
- In der letzten Stunde (1874)
- Gegen den Strom (1874)
- Nationale Gegensätze. Roman aus der jüngsten Vergangenheit. 2 Bände. Costenoble, Jena 1875.
- Ein verfehltes Leben (1877)
- Der Dämon des Hauses (1877)
- Der Pflegesohn (1879)
- Aus neuer Zeit (1880)
- Des Vaters Schuld. Roman. LeCoutre, Berlin 1881.
- Elfriede. Roman aus der vollen Gegenwart. Le Courtre, Berlin 1881.
- Zerrissene Fäden. Roman. Schottländer, Breslau 1881.
- Im Hause des Senators. Roman. 2 Bände. Bensheimer, Mannheim 1898.
- Schwere Tage. Novelle. Weichert, Berlin 1900.
- Rosa Herbst. Roman. Mitteldeutsche Verlagsanstalt, Dresden 1917.
