= Harald Parigger =

German writer

Harald Parigger, born 9 September 1953 in Flensburg, is a German historian and novelist. He studied history and Germanic in Würzburg. He became a secondary school teacher and later worked at the House of Bavarian History in Munich. He has written a number of academic essays, poems, plays, short stories and historical novels, mainly for children and young people. His novels include Im Schatten des schwarzen Todes (English- In the shadow of the black death), Der schwarze Mönch and Der Rubin des Königs.
