= Max Czollek =

German writer, lyric-poet, stage performer and curator

Max Czollek (2026)

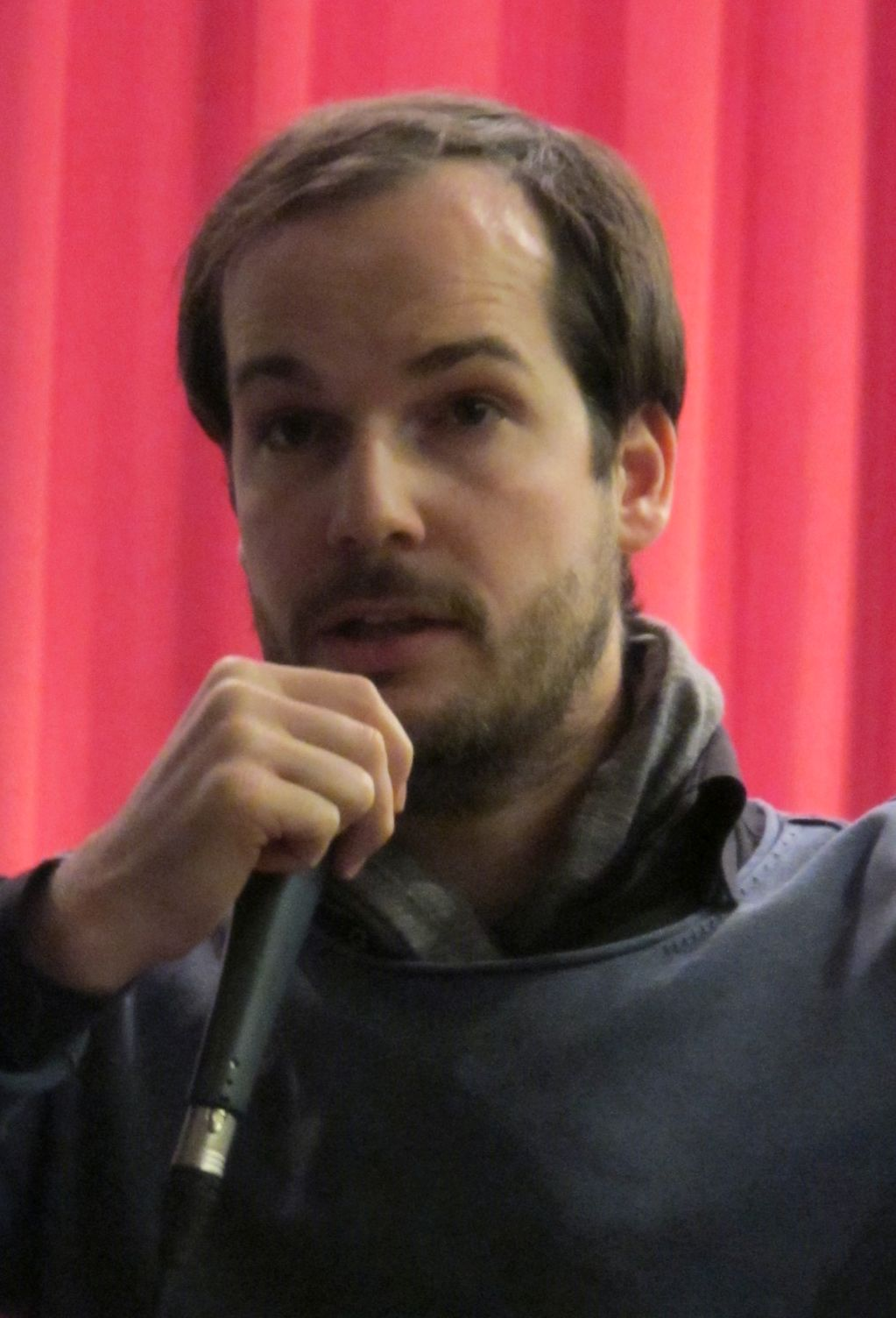
Max Czollek (2016)

Max Czollek (born 6 May 1987 in East Berlin) is a German writer, lyric-poet, stage performer and curator. He is a member of the "G13" authors' collective.

== Life ==
Czollek was born in Berlin in 1987. His paternal grandfather was a German Jew who survived several concentration camps, lived in exile in China for several years, and then returned to East Germany in the late 1940s. His only surviving Jewish relative is his paternal aunt. Max Czollek attended the Jewish Upper School Jüdisches Gymnasium Moses Mendelssohn (JGMM) in Berlin, passing his school finals (Abitur) in 2006. During his time at school he took a year abroad in Texas. Between 2007 and 2012 he studied political sciences at Berlin. Then, from 2012 to 2016 he worked on his doctorate at the Center for Research on Antisemitism (TU Berlin) and at Birkbeck, University of London. He was supported with a stipend from the Ernst Ludwig Ehrlich Scholarship Fund. Since 2016 he has been a member of the producers' collective "Jalta – Positionen zur jüdischen Gegenwart" ("Yalta - Positions on the Jewish Present").

Czollek has been part of the lyric-poetry collective G13 since 2009. In 2013 he initiated the international "Babelsprech" lyric-poetry project, in order to network a young German language "lyric scene".

Since 2014 he has teamed up with the novelist Deniz Utlu to organize the literature series "Gegenwartsbewältigung" (Note: a wordplay with Vergangenheitsbewältigung, loosely "struggle to overcome the [negatives of the] present" (instead of past)) at the Maxim Gorki Theater (Studio Я). Together with Sasha Marianna Salzmann he was co-instigator of the "Disintegration Congress" (2016) on contemporary Jewish thinking and of the "Radical Jewish Arts Days" ("Radikale Jüdische Kulturtage" 2017). During 2016/2017 he was co-leader with Esra Küçük of the Maxim Gorki Theater's "Young Berlin Council" project.

== Controversy about Jewish identity ==
Czollek self-identifies as Jewish. In 2021, Jewish writer Maxim Biller accused Czollek of appropriating a Jewish identity, as, according to traditional halakha, Czollek is not a Jew, having only one Jewish grandfather. In his column in the newspaper Die Zeit, Biller compared Czollek to Benjamin Wilkomirski, a Swiss writer who had confabulated his alleged Jewish origins. In reaction, the author Sasha Marianna Salzmann defended Czollek in the FAZ highlighting that questions of patrilinearity have long been a part of an inner-jewish plurality. Likewise, the journalist Ofer Waldman defended Czollek in Deutschlandfunk Kultur and called the attacks a religiously veiled political confrontation. In an open letter of support 278 Jewish and non-Jewish writers and other individuals mostly from the cultural sector supported Czollek and dismissed the attacks as politically motivated aiming to delegitimize Czolleks political work.

== Works ==
=== Poetry ===
- Druckkammern. Gedichte. Verlagshaus Berlin, Berlin 2012, ISBN 978-3-940249-52-4.
- Jubeljahre. Gedichte. Verlagshaus Berlin, Berlin 2015, ISBN 978-3-945832-00-4.
- A.H.A.S.V.E.R. Verlagshaus Berlin, Berlin 2016, ISBN 978-3-945832-16-5.
- Grenzwerte. Gedichte. Verlagshaus Berlin, Berlin 2019, ISBN 978-3-945832-34-9.
- Gute Enden. Gedichte. Verlagshaus Berlin, Berlin 2024, ISBN 978-3-910320-24-6.

With the Poetry Collective G13

- 40% Paradies. Gedichte des Lyrikkollektivs G13. Luxbooks, Wiesbaden 2013, ISBN 978-3-939557-70-8.
- Das war Absicht. SuKuLTuR, Berlin 2013, ISBN 978-3-95566-018-5.

=== Essays ===
- Desintegriert Euch! Carl Hanser Verlag, München 2018, ISBN 978-3-446-26027-6.
  - De-Integrate! A Jewish Survival Guide for the 21st Century. Restless Books, Brooklyn 2023, ISBN 978-1-63206-318-2.
- Gegenwartsbewältigung. Carl Hanser Verlag, München 2020, ISBN 978-3-446-26772-5.
- »Sog nit kejn mol, as du gejsst dem leztn weg.«: Zu einem Archiv wehrhafter Poesie bei Hirsch Glik. Series Zwiesprachen of the Stiftung Lyrik Kabinett. Das Wunderhorn, Heidelberg 2020, ISBN 978-3-88423-634-5.
- Empires Of Memory. Berliner Korrespondenzen (Deutsch-Englisch). Nicolai Verlag, 2020, ISBN 978-3-96476-309-9.
- Versöhnungstheater. Carl Hanser Verlag, München 2023, ISBN 978-3-446-27609-3.

=== Edited volumes ===
- with Michael Fehr, Robert Prosser (editor): Lyrik von Jetzt 3 / Babelsprech. Wallstein Verlag, Göttingen 2015, ISBN 978-3-8353-1739-0.
- with Sasha Marianna Salzmann (editor): Desintegration. Ein Kongress zeitgenössischer jüdischer Positionen. Kerber Verlag, Berlin 2017, ISBN 978-3-7356-0340-1
- with Micha Brumlik, Marina Chernivsky, Hannah Peaceman, Anna Schapiro, Lea Wohl von Haselberg: Jalta. Positionen zur jüdischen Gegenwart. Half-yearly publication, since 2017 ISSN 2510-3725
- Leah Carola Czollek, Gudrun Perko, Corinne Kaszner, Max Czollek: Praxishandbuch Social Justice und Diversity: Theorien, Training, Methoden, Übungen. Completely revised and expanded 2nd edition. Beltz Juventa, 2019, ISBN 978-3-7799-3845-3.
- with Erik Riedel, Mirjam Wenzel (editor): Rache. Geschichte und Fantasie. (German edition): Accompanying volume to the exhibition at the Jüdisches Museum Frankfurt. Carl Hanser Verlag, München 2022, ISBN 978-3-446-27245-3.
  - Revenge. History and Fantasie. (English edition): Accompanying volume to the exhibition at the Jüdisches Museum Frankfurt. Carl Hanser Verlag, München 2022, ISBN 978-3-446-27245-3.
- Co-editor: Nachhalle. (= Jalta. Positionen zur jüdischen Gegenwart. Vol. 8). Neofelis Verlag, Berlin 2023, ISBN 978-3-95808-354-7.

=== Podcast ===
- with Hadija Haruna-Oelker: Trauer und Turnschuh (since 2023).
