= Gerhard Kofler =

Austrian-Italian writer (1949–2005)

Gerhard Kofler (11 February 1949 in Bolzano – 2 November 2005 in Vienna) was an Austrian-Italian writer. He wrote poetry and essays in both Italian and German.

Kofler studied Germanistics and Romance studies in Innsbruck and Salzburg and was a poet and literature critic, as well as general secretary of the Grazer Autorenversammlung literary association in Vienna.

Kofler translated poetry including poems from H. C. Artmann, Gerald Bisinger, Ernst Jandl, Friederike Mayröcker, and Gerhard Rühm into Italian. He also translated works from Italian into German, including those of Umberto Saba.

His poems were translated into many other languages, including Greek, Hungarian, Russian and Spanish.
