= Mutlu Ergün-Hamaz =

German author (born 1978)

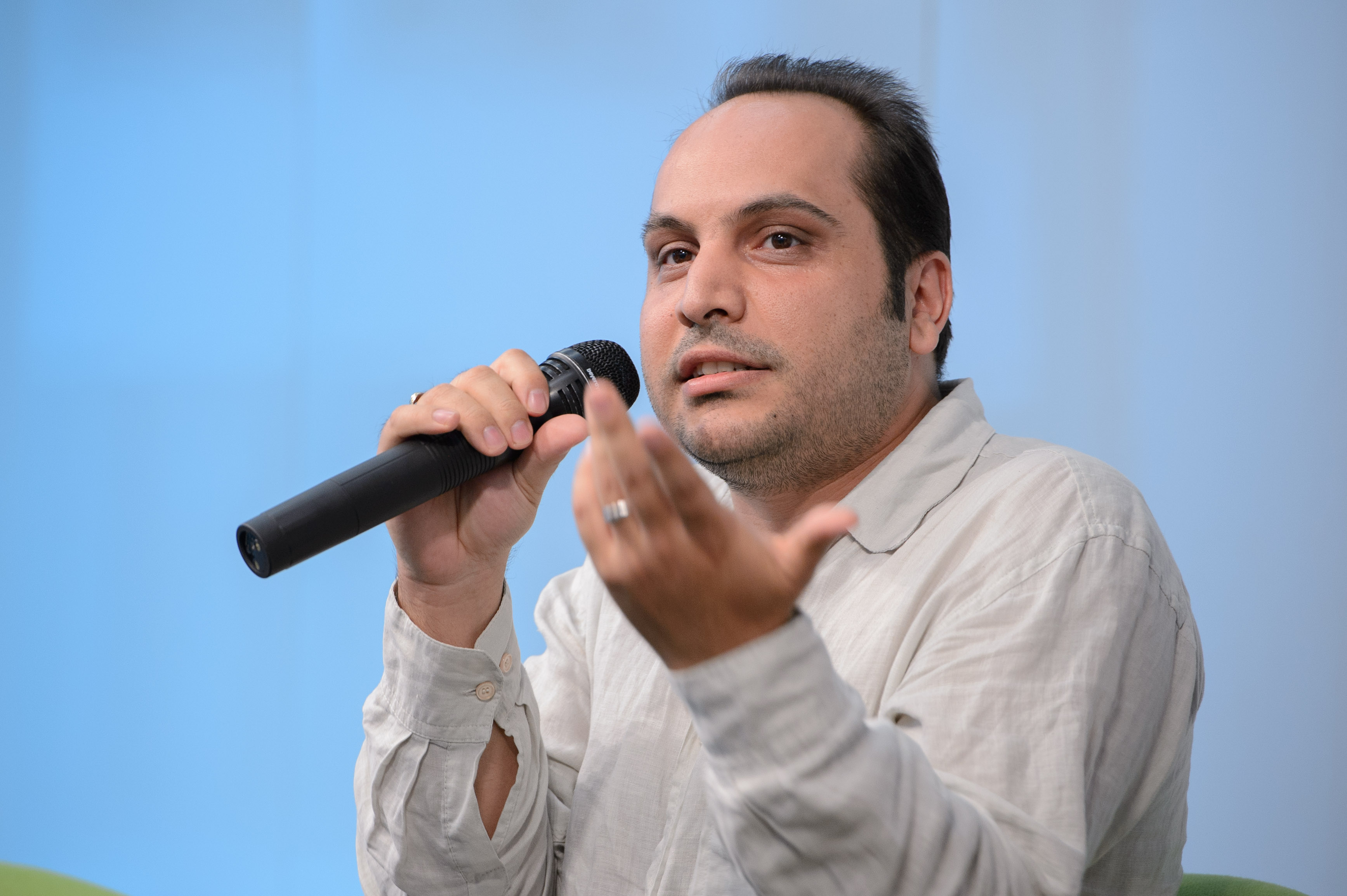
- Mutlu Ergün-Hamaz in 2013
- Born: 2 June 1978 (age 48); Berlin, West Germany
- Occupations: Author, Editor, Trainer, Social Researcher, Performer
- Spouse: Sofia Hamaz
- Children: 1
- Writing career
- Notable work: Kara Günlük: Die Geheimen Tagebücher des Sesperado

Mutlu Ergün-Hamaz is a German author, social researcher, anti-racism trainer and performer. He was born on 2 June 1978 in Berlin, West Germany (now Germany). Ergün-Hamaz is best known for his debut novel Kara Günlük: Die Geheimen Tagebücher des Sesperado, published in Germany in 2010. He currently lives in Berlin, Germany.

== Life ==
=== Early life ===
Mutlu Ergün-Hamaz was born as Mutlu Ergün in 1978 in Berlin, Germany to Perihan and Muharrem Ergün. He has one older brother, Merih Ergün, who was born in 1972 in Berlin as well. Their father emigrated from West Anatolia in Turkey to Berlin in the 1960s as a gastarbeiter. He was interested in experiencing life in Germany but also in creating a better future for himself and his family. A few years later he brought his wife to Germany. He initially worked on construction sites, later as an interpreter and translator in public service. His wife worked as a cleaner, factory worker and finally as a kitchen help in a kindergarten. By moving to Germany they worked hard to build a new life, hoping for a better future for their children and supporting the extended family in Turkey.

Initially they lived in Wedding (Berlin), which still is predominantly a working class and ethnically diverse area. Ergün-Hamaz states about his early years: "I don't remember much of that time there, but I think I felt comfortable in kindergarten."

His father had worked for a few years in public service, when in the early 1980s the house they lived in burnt down (who or what started the fire remained inconclusive). They were then moved into a housing cooperative for people working in public service in Westend (Berlin). Their family was the only Turkish-German family in the area. Merih Ergün, his brother, was a good student in Wedding, but after the move to Westend he struggled a lot in primary school which shaped his experience of the German education system significantly

. Ergün-Hamaz notes that he himself "was also singled out because of [his] Turkishness in kindergarten in Charlottenburg and some of the children would refuse to engage with [him]. [He] remember[s] from a very early age feeling out of place in Charlottenburg, even asking [his] mother if [he] was German or Turkish [...] which [he] didn't really understand as a child because [he] just felt or wanted to feel like everyone else around [him] and not different."

=== Academic background ===
In primary school, Ergün-Hamaz was considered a mediocre student. He was not an angel in school, but mainly the students of color were branded as trouble-makers. During his secondary school years, Ergün-Hamaz felt alienated and could tell that something was wrong in his country.

As a child, Ergün-Hamaz wanted to be a lawyer, but when he grew up he was more interested in writing and literature. For him educational sciences was a good combination of psychology and sociology, that is why he decided to study Education and Contemporary German Literature at the Free University Berlin. After finishing his studies, Ergün-Hamaz moved to Great Britain in 2006. On the one hand to live with his partner Sofia Hamaz and on the other hand to start a master program in Race and Ethnic Relations at Birkbeck College, University of London. He finished his master studies in 2008 and began doing his PhD at the London School of Economics and Political Science (LSE) in the Sociology Department a year later. Recently, he has been doing qualitative research on German anti-racism practitioners for his dissertation.

=== Main ideas and influences ===
Ergün-Hamaz argues racism is still unconsciously prevalent in Western society. The society is based on White privilege to the disadvantage of People of Color. In order to undo racism, white people have to become aware of their racist attitude towards People of Color. Ergün-Hamaz is i. a. influenced by Whiteness studies, Postcolonialism, Orientalism, Black feminism and Black Panther Party. He applies their concepts to the situation of non-white German population. Also, contemporaries as Sybil Phoenix and Noah Sow (de) had a crucial impact on Ergün-Hamaz. Ergün-Hamaz gives an example for how children are inclined to develop an unconscious racism, describing how the TV news series for children Logo! explains terrorism to its young viewers. For this purpose, it shows pictures of non-white Arabic terrorists. The children learn to associate People of Color with terrorism. Logo could have used a picture of a RAF terrorist as well. To end this practice, Ergün-Hamaz proposes to introduce an organization as the Ofcom in Germany.

=== Personal life ===
Ergün-Hamaz is married to Sofia Hamaz. She is an editor and social researcher. They lived in London for four years, until they moved back to Berlin in 2011. Their son, Jibril Yeshaya, was born in 2013.

== Anti-racism work ==
=== Novel ===
Ergün-Hamaz has been active in the anti-racism community in Germany. This has been most reflected in his studies and in the writing of his only novel Kara Günlük. Die geheimen Tagebücher des Sesperado. The novel was written primarily for People of Color with the purpose of making social theories on racism and empowerment available to non-academics and people with less formal education. The novel is fictional, however much of it is based on the personal experiences of Ergün-Hamaz, his family and his friends, while also being supplemented by realistic invented experiences. The book was well received by audiences of color, while white audiences had more mixed responses, feeling rather offended by it

. Ergün-Hamaz refers to his novel as a bildungsroman. The book is written in the form of a diary. The protagonist, a university student who goes by the name Sesperado, describes and reflects on his experiences as an anti-racist activist and on those of his friends living in a society shaped by everyday racism.

=== Other engagements ===
In 2001, Ergün-Hamaz joined Phoenix e.V. one of the oldest and largest anti-racism NGOs in Germany with over 500 members in more than 30 countries. Initially starting out as a trainee, it took him some seven years to truly understand the purpose of the company and what he was doing there. Ergün-Hamaz now sits on the extended board of the organization and facilitates regional groups in the Frankfurt area. He is also part of the Phoenix Train the Trainers meetings, which take place twice a year, where trainers and trainees have the opportunity to develop and learn.

In 2004, together with Deniz Utlu, Ergün-Hamaz began monthly "a thousand words deep" readings at Cafe VorWien to provide to writers and musicians of color with a platform to present their work. At the end of each session, Ergün-Hamaz or Utlu would then present their own readings. It was during this time that much of Ergün-Hamaz's novel was written, incorporating much of the live audience feedback. During this process the main character of the novel was also born. These performances were pivotal as they helped Ergün-Hamaz realize his love of making people laugh. He believes that laughter and humor help people to loosen and open up to ideas that challenge their worldview.

From 2008 to 2012, along with friend Noah Sow, Ergün-Hamaz led a show called Edutainment Attacke! It was inspired by Ergün-Hamaz's novel, and Sow's novel Deutschland Schwarz Weiss. Der alltägliche Rassismus. The purpose was to create an entertaining and educational show in order to educate White people and People of Color about everyday racism in Germany. The show's success resulted in Ergün-Hamaz being approached by Unrast Verlag (de) in order to publish his novel.

== Works ==
=== Novels ===
- Kara Günlük. Die geheimen Tagebücher des Sesperado, Unrast Verlag, Münster. 2010. ISBN 978-3-89771-608-7

=== Selected articles ===
- Doing Race. Wie werden Menschen zu „Anderen“ gemacht?' In: Karim Fereidooni, Antonietta P. Zeoli (Ed.): Managing Diversity, Springer Verlag, Cham, Schweiz 2016.
- Empowerment bedeutet Lebensmöglichkeiten entdecken und verwirklichen – für alle. Zülfukar Çetin im Gespräch mit Mutlu Ergün-Hamaz. In: Zülfukar Çetin, Savaş Taş (Ed.): Gespräche über Rassismus. Perspektiven & Widerstände, Verlag Yilmaz-Günay, Berlin 2015.
- Von den Bildern in unseren Köpfen. In: Berliner Entwicklungspolitischer Ratschlag (Ed.): Wer anderen einen Brunnen gräbt – Rassismuskritik, Empowerment, Globaler Kontext, Berlin 2012.
- Die (un-)sichtbaren Zusammenhänge des Weiß-Seins in der Kulturproduktion. In: Migrationsrat Berlin Brandenburg (Ed.): Institutioneller Rassismus – Ein Plädoyer für deutschlandweite Aktionspläne gegen Rassismus und ethnische Diskriminierung, 2011, 38–40.

=== Co-editor ===
- Dossier Empowerment für die Migration, Integration, Diversity Webseite der Heinrich-Böll-Stiftung, 2013.
