= Robert Kraft (writer) =

German writer (1869–1916)

Emil Robert Kraft (3 October 1869 in Leipzig – 10 May 1916 in Haffkrug) was a German writer of detective and adventure novels. He has been compared to Karl May.

== Biography ==
Robert Kraft was born in Leipzig as the son of a wine merchant. His parents were divorced early. In high school he was expelled due to his absenteeism. On the orders of his father, Kraft trained as a locksmith and in 1887 attended the Königliche Höhere Gewerbeschule (Royal Higher Vocational School) in Chemnitz.

In 1889, he stole a sum of money from his father and was arrested a short time later. In Hamburg he hired on the ship Shakespeare, and near Greenland it capsized. After the rescue, he worked on other ships around the world, and in 1890 ended up in Egypt, where he eked out a living doing odd jobs and lived with an Egyptian woman in the desert. He went as a stowaway on a ship to Constantinople and became ill with cholera.

The German Consulate in Constantinople asked Kraft to complete his military service as soon as possible, so he went to Wilhelmshaven and served three years in the Imperial Navy. By his own account, he spent most of his time in the camp with discarded books from ships' libraries and found plenty of time for reading. Subsequently, he returned to Egypt to be with desert hunters. In the Libyan desert he met with Rifa'i - dervishes, during which he worked intensively with supernatural phenomena. At the same time he had to admit that he was not cut out for an adventurous life far from European amenities.

As reconciliation with his father in Germany failed, he moved to London and in 1895 married Johanna Rehbein. The couple had two daughters. Kraft made contacts with Münchmeyer Publishing House in Dresden, which would publish his Kolportage novels. The commitment of the publishing house led him to return home to Germany in 1896. When his father later died, Kraft inherited his considerable fortune. In 1902 he traveled with his family to Monte Carlo, then to London where within a year he lost all his assets. Penniless, he moved again to Germany to write popular fiction, lived in Kleinzschachwitz in Dresden, Friedrich Hagen, Bad Schandau, Dresden and Hamburg.

== Filmography ==
- Die Gespenster von Garden Hall (1919)
- Nobody (1921, serial)
