= List of German women writers =

This is a list of women writers who were born in Germany or whose writings are closely associated with it.

== A ==
- Maximiliane Ackers (1896–1982), lesbian actress, novelist, scriptwriter
- Martha Albrand (1914–1981), novelist
- Helene Adler (1849–1923), German Jewish poet and educator
- Hannah Arendt (1906–1975), German Jewish political theorist
- Bettina von Arnim (1785–1859), writer, novelist
- Ludmilla Assing (1785–1859), short story writer, biographer
- Anita Augspurg (1857–1943), feminist, lawyer, actress
- Elisabeth Augustin (1903–2001), poet, short story writer, novelist, wrote in German and Dutch
- Frau Ava (c.1060–1127), first woman writer in German

== B ==
- Ingrid Bachér (born 1930), playwright, screenwriter
- Bertha Badt-Strauss (1885–1970), journalist, biographer, translator
- Amalie Baisch (1859–1904), writer of etiquette guide books
- Zsuzsa Bánk (born 1965), novelist
- Gertrud Bäumer (1873–1954), writer, feminist
- Sybille Bedford (1873–1954), German born English-language novelist, non-fiction writer, memoirist
- Maria Beig (1920–2018), novelist
- Hedwig von Beit (1896–1973), folklorist
- Margot Benary-Isbert (1889–1979), children's writer in German and English
- Augusta Bender (1846–1924), writer, poet, folklorist, activist
- Josefa Berens-Totenohl (1891–1969), novelist
- Sibylle Berg (born 1962), successful novelist, essayist, short story writer, playwright
- Dörthe Binkert (born 1949), novelist, non-fiction writer
- Charlotte Birch-Pfeiffer (c. 1800–1868), playwright, actress
- Anne Birk (1942–2009), novelist
- Ilse Blumenthal-Weiss (1899–1987), poet
- Helene Böhlau (1859–1940), novelist
- Margarete Böhme (1867–1939), novelist, author of Tagebuch einer Verlorenen
- Emily Bold (born 1980), novelist
- Nora Bossong (born 1982), poet, novelist and non-fiction writer
- Vera Botterbusch (born 1942), journalist, film producer
- Johanna Braun (1929–2008), German writer
- Angelika Brandt (born 1961), deep-sea biologist, non-fiction writer
- Lily Braun (1865–1916), feminist writer
- Ilse Gräfin von Bredow (1922–2014), novelist and non-fiction writer
- Alina Bronsky (born 1978), novelist and children's writer
- Christine Brückner (1921–1996), novelist, short story writer, children's writer
- Tissy Bruns (1951–2013), journalist
- Traude Bührmann (born 1942), novelist, journalist, translator
- Frieda von Bülow (1857–1909), writer
- Margarethe von Bülow (1860–1884), novelist

== C ==
- Marie Calm (1832–1887), instructional book writer, novelist, poet
- Elisabeth Castonier (1894–1975), children's writer, journalist, writing in German and English
- Helmina von Chézy (1783–1856), poet, playwright, librettist
- Helene Christaller (1872–1953), children's novelist
- Zehra Çırak (born 1960), Turkish-born German poet, short story writer
- Alexandra Cordes (1935–1986), novelist, mainly romantic fiction
- Hedwig Courths-Mahler (1867–1950), novelist

== D ==
- Utta Danella (1920–2015), novelist
- Gertrud David (1872–1936), journalist, filmmaker
- Henriette Davidis (1801–1876), cookbook writer
- Auguste von der Decken (1827-1908), de:Auguste von der Decken, German author and writer
- Clara von Dincklage-Campe (1829-1919), de:Clara von Dincklage-Campe, German writer
- Emmy von Dincklage (1825-1891), de:Emmy von Dincklage, German writer
- Hilde Domin (1909–2006), poet
- Marion Dönhoff (1909–2002), acclaimed journalist, non-fiction writer
- Doris Dörrie (born 1955), novelist, film director
- Ingeborg Drewitz (1923–1986), playwright, novelist
- Annette von Droste-Hülshoff (1797–1848), poet
- Anne Duden (born 1942), prose writer and poet
- Karen Duve (born 1961), novelist and short story writer

== E ==
- Elizabeth Charlotte, Princess Palatine (in German: Liselotte von der Pfalz) (1652–1722), letter writer
- Margareta Ebner, (1291–1351), diarist, mystic
- Susanna Eger (1640–1713), cook and cookbook writer, author of Leipziger Kochbuch (1706)
- Gisela Elsner (1937–1992), novelist
- Helene von Engelhardt (1850–1910), Baltic German poet, writer, translator
- Aslı Erdoğan (born 1967), human rights activist, novelist, columnist, one novel translated into English
- Jenny Erpenbeck (born 1967), novelist
- Nataly von Eschstruth (1860–1939), novelist

== F ==
- Helene von Falkenhausen (1873-1945), de: Helene von Falkenhausen, German novelist
- Eva Figes (1932–2012), German-born English novelist, critic, memoirist
- Caroline Auguste Fischer (1764–1842), writer and women's rights activist
- Marieluise Fleißer (1901–1974), playwright
- Meta Forkel-Liebeskind (1765–1853), writer, translator
- Julia Franck (born 1970), novelist
- Louise von François (1817–1893), novelist
- Friederike Fless (born 1964), classical archaeologist
- Bella Fromm (1901–1974), journalist, diarist
- Cornelia Funke (born 1958), children's writer, author of The Thief Lord, Inkheart series

== G ==
- Miriam Gebhardt (born 1962), historian, non-fiction writer
- Heike Geißler (born 1977), novelist and essayist
- Adine Gemberg (1858–1902) feminist novelist
- Doris Gercke (1937–2025), pen name Mary-Jo Morell, crime thriller novelist
- Karen Gershon (1923–1993), German-born English poet, novelist, non-fiction writer
- Rosa Gilissen-Vanmarcke (1969–2021), historian
- Glückel of Hameln (1646–1724), Yiddish-language diarist
- Helga Goetze (1922–2008), poet and artist
- Claire Goll (1890–1977), German-born poet, novelist, writing in German and French
- Natalie Grams (born 1978), German physician, writer, scientific skeptic, former homeopath
- Argula von Grumbach (1492–1554), poet, letter writer, first Protestant woman writer
- Karoline von Günderrode (1780–1806), poet

== H ==
- Ida, Countess of Hahn-Hahn (1805–1880), German novelist
- Thea von Harbou (1888–1954), novelist, screenwriter
- Petra Hartmann (born 1970), journalist, novelist, children's writer
- Elke Hartmann-Puls (1969–2021), historian
- Heidi Hassenmüller (1941–2020), journalist and writer of young adult literature
- Uta-Maria Heim (born 1963), playwright, novelist, poet
- Emmy Hennings (1885–1948), poet, performer
- Ulrike Henschke (1830–1897), novelist and writer on educational theory
- Luise Hensel (1798–1876), religious writer, poet
- Clara Hepner (1860–1939), children's stories
- Judith Hermann (born 1970), short story writer
- Elisabeth von Heyking (1861–1925), novelist, travel writer, diarist
- Hildegard of Bingen (1098–1179), mystic, playwright, poet writing in Latin
- Wilhelmine von Hillern (1836–1916), actress, novelist, short story writer
- Karla Höcker (1901–1992), novelist, biographer
- Barbara Honigmann (born 1949), novelist
- Hrotsvith von Gandersheim (c.935–c.1002), dramatist, poet, writing in Latin
- Therese Huber (1764–1829), novelist, short story writer, essayist, translator
- Ricarda Huch (1864–1947), historian, novelist, poet

== J ==
- Margarethe Jodl (1859–1937), writer and women's rights activist
- Antonie Jüngst (1843-1918), writer and poet

== K ==
- Anja Kampmann (born 1983), poet, novelist
- Yadé Kara (born 1965), Turkish-German novelist
- Anna Louisa Karsch (1722–1791), poet, letter writer
- Marie Luise Kaschnitz (1901–1974), leading post-war poet, short story writer, essayist
- Judith Kerr (1923–2019), German-born children's writer in English
- Hedwig Kettler (1851–1937), short story writer, activist, education reformer
- Irmgard Keun (1905–1982), novelist
- Johanna Kinkel (1810–1858), novelist, non-fiction works on music, autobiographer
- Sarah Kirsch (1935–2013), poet, translator
- Karin Kiwus (born 1942), poet
- Ines Köhler-Zülch (1941–2019), folklorist
- Annette Kolb (1870–1967), novelist, pacifist, non-fiction writer
- Gertrud Kolmar (1894–1943), poet
- Clementine Krämer (1873–1942), short story writer, poet, social worker, activist
- Ursula Krechel (born 1947), poet, novelist, playwright, critic
- Brigitte Kronauer (1940–2019), novelist
- Isolde Kurz (1853–1944), acclaimed poet, short story writer

== L ==
- Vera Lachmann (1904–1985), poet, classicist, educator
- Hedwig Lachmann (1865–1918), author, translator and poet
- Nuray Lale (born 1962), Turkish-German writer, translator
- Ruth Landshoff (1904–1966), German-American actress, novelist, poet, columnist, wrote in German and English
- Katja Lange-Müller (born 1951), novelist
- Elisabeth Langgässer (1899–1950), poet, novelist
- Sophie von La Roche (1730–1807), novelist
- Else Lasker-Schüler (1869–1945), poet, playwright
- Gertrud von Le Fort (1876–1971), novelist, poet, essayist
- Katerina Lemmel (1466–1533), letter-writer, nun
- Ellen Lenneck (1851–1880), novelist, short story writer
- Fanny Lewald (1811–1889), novelist, feminist
- Sonia Levitin (born 1934), German-born English-language children's and young adults' writer, essayist
- Sibylle Lewitscharoff (1954–2023), novelist
- Mechtilde Lichnowsky (1879–1958), poet, playwright, essayist
- Adda von Liliencron (1844–1913), de:Adda von Liliencron, writer
- Angela Litschev (born 1978), Bulgarian-born German poet
- Cornelia Lüdecke (born 1954), polar researcher, historian

== M ==
- Heidrun E. Mader (born 1977), German theologian
- Erika Mann (1905–1969), anti-Nazi writer, performer, daughter of Thomas Mann
- E. Marlitt (Eugenie John, 1825–1877), novelist
- Monika Maron (born 1941), essayist, political writer
- Petra Mathers (1945–2024), German-born American children's writer, illustrator
- Mechthild of Magdeburg (c.1207–c.1282/94), mystic, writing in Low German
- Mechthild of Hackeborn (1240/41–1298), religious writer in Latin
- Sophie Mereau (1770–1806), novelist, poet
- Malwida von Meysenbug (1816–1903), political writer, memoirist
- Agnes Miegel (1879–1964), journalist, writer, poet
- Jo Mihaly (1902–1989), diarist, novelist, dancer
- Irmtraud Morgner (1933–1990), novelist
- Petra Morsbach (born 1956), novelist
- Lisel Mueller (1924–2020), German-born American poet
- Luise Mühlbach (1814–1873), historical novelist, many works translated into English
- Inge Müller (1925–1966), poet, playwright, children's writer
- Herta Müller (born 1953), Romanian-born German novelist, poet, and essayist, Nobel Prize winner

== N ==
- Benedikte Naubert (1752–1819), historical novelist
- Friederike Caroline Neuber (1697–1760), playwright, actress
- Hildegard Maria Nickel (born 1948), sociologist specializing in gender studies
- Charlotte Niese (1854–1935), non-fiction writer, poet
- Ingrid Noll (born 1935), novelist
- Helene von Nostitz (1878–1944), writer (de:Helene von Nostitz)
- Helga M. Novak (1935–2013), poet, political writer

== O ==
- Katja Oskamp (born 1970), novelist and short story writer
- Louise Otto-Peters (1819–1895), poet, journalist, feminist
- Angelika Overath (born 1957), author, journalist
- Emine Sevgi Özdamar (born 1946), Turkish-born German novelist, playwright

== P ==
- Henriette Paalzow (1788–1847), historical novelist
- Peggy Parnass (1927–2025), actress, columnist, court reporter, short story writer, memoirist
- Annette Pehnt (born 1967), literary critic
- Marie Petersen (1816–1859), story writer, author of the fairy tale Princess Ilse
- Luise von Ploennies (1803–1872), poet, translator
- Karla Poewe (born 1941), anthropologist, non-fiction writer
- Luise F. Pusch (born 1944), linguist, feminist, essayist

== R ==
- Elisa von der Recke (Elisabeth Recke) (1754–1833), writer, poet from Courland
- Eva Gabriele Reichmann (1897–1998), historian, works on anti-Semitism
- Ilse Reicke (1893–1989), jounrlaist, novelist and writer
- Brigitte Reimann (1933–1973), novelist
- Annemarie Reinhard (1921–1976), novelist, children's writer
- Christa Reinig (1926–2008), poet, novelist, non-fiction writer, playwright
- Gabriele Reuter (1859–1941), novelist, essayist, children's writer
- Jutta Richter (born 1955), children's writer
- Brigitte Riebe (also Laura Stern) (born 1953), novelist
- Luise Rinser (1911–2002), novelist, autobiographer, children's writer
- Ruth Margarete Roellig (1878–1969), novelist, travel writer, journalist
- Anna Rosmus (born 1960), non-fiction writer, works on Nazi treatment of Jews
- Friederike Roth (born 1948), playwright
- Alice Rühle-Gerstel (1894–1943), journalist, psychologist, feminist
- Anna Rüling, pen name of Theo Anna Sprüngli (1880–1953), journalist, LGBT activist

== S ==
- Lessie Sachs (1897–1942), poet and artist
- Nelly Sachs (1891–1970), poet, playwright
- Mithu Sanyal (born 1971), non-fiction writer, novelist and essayist
- Rahel Sanzara (1894–1936), novelist
- Oda Schaefer (1900–1988), poet, journalist
- Maria Sophia Schellhammer (bapt. 1647–1719), cookbook writer
- Caroline Schelling (1763–1809), essayist, critic, correspondent
- Dorothea von Schlegel (1764–1839), novelist, translator
- Elke Schmitter (born 1961), novelist
- Elizabeth of Schönau (1129–1165), visionary writing in Latin
- Amalie Schoppe (1791–1858), children's writer
- Claudia Schoppmann (born 1958), historian, nonfiction writer
- Martina Schradi (born 1972), writer, cartoonist
- Adele Schreiber-Krieger (1872–1957), journalist, screenwriter, politician
- Angelika Schrobsdorff (1927–2016), best selling novelist, actress
- Helga Schubert (born 1940), fiction, non-fiction, and children's writer, psychologist
- Sibylla Schwarz (1621–1638), Baroque poet
- Anna Seghers (1900–1983), novelist, author of The Seventh Cross
- Ina Seidel (1885–1974), novelist, poet and writer
- Marie Simon (1824–1877), nurse and writer
- Angela Sommer-Bodenburg (born 1948), children's writer, author of The Little Vampire
- Gesine Spieß (1945–2016), educationalist specializing in gender studies
- Ilse von Stach (1879–1941), playwright, novelist, poet
- Charlotte von Stein, (1742–1827), dramatist, friend of Goethe
- Gisela Steineckert (born 1931), poet, songwriter
- Ginka Steinwachs (born 1942), novelist, playwright, nonfiction writer
- Lulu von Strauss und Torney (1873–1956), poet and writer
- Eva Strittmatter (1930–2011), poet, children's writer
- Antje Rávic Strubel (born 1974), novelist
- Karin Struck (1947–2006), short story writer, novelist
- Herma Studeny (1886–1973), poet, nonfiction writer
- Rita Süssmuth (1937–2026), nonfiction writer

== T ==
- Fanny Tarnow (1779–1862), short story writer, playwright
- Renata Thiele (born c.1960), Polish-born German novelist, short story writer, editor
- Adrienne Thomas, pen name of Hertha A. Deutsch (1897–1980), autobiographical novelist
- Dorothea Tieck (1799–1841), translator of Shakespeare
- Canan Topçu (born 1965), Turkish-German writer, works on Turkish immigration in German

== V ==
- Rahel Varnhagen (1771–1833), essayist, correspondent
- Clara Viebig (1862–1952), novelist, playwright
- Hermine Villinger (1849–1917), novelist and short story writer
- Helene Voigt-Diederichs (1875–1961), travel writer, novelist, short story writer

== W ==
- Marianne Weber (1870–1954), women's rights activist, nonfiction writer
- Ruth Weiss (1928–2020), German-born American poet, performer, playwright
- Ruth Weiss (1924–2025), German-born South African writer, novels, young adult books, memoirs
- Anna Elisabet Weirauch (1887–1970), playwright, novelist
- Ruth Westheimer (born Karola Siegel, 1928–2024), German-American sex therapist, talk show host, author, professor, Holocaust survivor, and former Haganah sniper.
- Ottilie Wildermuth (1817–1877), children's writer, novelist, biographer
- Gabriele Wohmann (1932–2015), novelist, short story writer
- Christa Wolf (1929–2011), novelist, critic, essayist
- Caroline von Wolzogen (1763–1847), novelist, biographer
- Christine Wunnicke (born 1966), novelist and translator
- Mathilde Wurm (1874–1935), politician, journalist

== Y ==
- Barbara Yelin (born 1977), cartoonist

== Z ==
- Sidonia Hedwig Zäunemann (1711–1740), poet
- Susanna Elizabeth Zeidler (1657–c.1706), poet
- Juli Zeh (born 1974), novelist, author of Eagles and Angels
- Eva Zeller (1923–2022), poet, novelist
- Hedda Zinner (also Elisabeth Frank, 1905–1994), political writer
- Kathinka Zitz-Halein (1801–1877), poet, biographer
- Unica Zürn (1916–1970), poet, artist

== See also ==
- List of women writers
- List of Austrian women writers
- List of Swiss women writers
- List of Luxembourg women writers
- List of German-language authors
