= Alfred Döblin Prize =

German literary award

The Alfred Döblin Prize (German: Alfred-Döblin-Preis) is a German literary award. Named after Alfred Döblin, it was endowed by Günter Grass in 1979. The prize is awarded every two years jointly by the Academy of Arts, Berlin and the Literary Colloquium Berlin for substantial unpublished literary works in progress.

The current prize level on offer is 15,000 Euros. It is a requirement of the award that finalists take part in a reading competition: nominees are invited to the Literary Colloquium Berlin where they read out their texts and open them to discussion. Since 2007, selected authors' presentations have been recorded and made available on the German literary portal Literaturport.

The prize winner is nominated by the jury directly after the reading; the awards ceremony then takes place traditionally the following day at the Academy of Arts, Berlin.

== Winners ==
- 1979: Gerold Späth
- 1980: Klaus Hoffer
- 1981: Gert Hofmann
- 1983: Gerhard Roth
- 1985: Stefan Schütz
- 1987: Libuše Moníková
- 1989: Einar Schleef, Edgar Hilsenrath
- 1991: Peter Kurzeck, Förderpreis: Norbert Bleisch
- 1993: Reinhard Jirgl, Förderpreis: Andreas Neumeister
- 1995: Katja Lange-Müller, Förderpreis: Ingo Schulze
- 1997: Ingomar von Kieseritzky, Michael Wildenhain
- 1999: Norbert Gstrein
- 2001: Josef Winkler, Förderpreis: Heike Geißler
- 2003: Kathrin Groß-Striffler
- 2005: Jan Faktor
- 2007: Michael Kumpfmüller
- 2009: Eugen Ruge
- 2011: Jan Peter Bremer
- 2013: Saša Stanišić
- 2015: Natascha Wodin
- 2017: María Cecilia Barbetta
- 2019: Ulrich Woelk
- 2021: Deniz Utlu
- 2023: Jan Kuhlbrodt
- 2025: Sophia Merwald
