= Paul List (publisher) =

German publisher

Paul List (21 August 1869 – 30 April 1929) was a German publisher.

== Life ==
Born in Berlin the son of Kommerzienrat Friedrich Jacob Alfred List (1829-1882), banker and co-founder of Allgemeine Deutsche Credit-Anstalt, and his wife Christine Marie Louise, née Simon, started out in Göttingen But then he started the career of his grandfather, the Berlin publisher Jacob Alfred List (1778-1848), who studied agriculture and became a bookseller at the publishing house Schall & Grund, Berlin.

On April 1, 1894 List founded the Paul List Verlag in Berlin, in the tradition of his grandfather's List-Verlag, which was founded in 1814. In 1896 he moved to Leipzig, Carolinenstraße 22, where he concentrated on light fiction and non-fiction. Among its most successful authors was Nataly von Eschstruth.

Together with Felix von Bressensdorf (1876-1955) he founded in 1907 a publishing house for schoolbooks, whose "geographical section" he established by buying the corresponding parts of the Brunswick publishing house Helmut Wollermann. This was the beginning of an important production in the field of textbooks, which is still going on today and puts the publishing house into the ranks of the well-known textbook publishers. The main author was Heinrich Harms, under whose direction wall maps, atlases, geographical textbooks and educational books were produced. List took over Abel & Müller Verlag in 1919, from which it separated again in 1925.

Paul List was married to Margarete Gottfried (1873-1944), daughter of Emil Gustav Gottfried, a councillor of commerce and owner of the sugar factory Sachsenröder & Gottfried in Leipzig, and his wife Melitta, née Zangenberg. His brother-in-law was the painter Oswald Gottfried.

His son Paul Walter List (1899-1989) joined the business in 1919, took over the management in 1929 and ran the publishing house, which he continued in Munich after 1945, until 1972. List was awarded the Bavarian Order of Merit in 1964.

The Leipzig-based List publishing house was taken over in 1945 under fiduciary administration and in 1977 was incorporated into the Verlagsgruppe Kiepenheuer Leipzig, which operated until 1990. In 1947 the former Carolinenstraße in Leipzig was renamed Paul-List-Straße.

Paul List Verlag published the complete works of Knut Hamsun. Since 2004 the publishing house is an imprint of Ullstein Buchverlage.

Paul List died in Leipzig at the age of 59.

== Literature ==
- Joachim Burckas (1985). "List, Paul". Neue Deutsche Biographie (in German). Vol. 14. Berlin: Duncker & Humblot. pp. 692–693. (.html full text online).
- Hans Altenhein: Familiengeschichten. Zur Kritik einer buchhandelshistorischen Methode. Paul-List-Verlag München. Buchhandel, Geschichte. Paul-List-Verlag Leipzig. Buchhandel, Geschichte. Paul W. List. Buchhandel. Geschichte. Buchkulturen, 2005, Literature by and about Paul List (publisher) in the German National Library catalogue.
- Mikhail Kalinin, Thomas E. Lawrence: Bücher aus dem Paul List Verlag. Exilliteratur. Paul List Verlag, Leipzig 1937, Literature by and about Paul List (publisher) in the German National Library catalogue.
- Almanach des Paul-List-Verlages. (3.1928 – [6.]1931; 1959–). Paul List Verlag, Leipzig 1928 ff., Literature by and about Paul List (publisher) in the German National Library catalogue.
