= Jakob-Wassermann-Literaturpreis =

German literary award

The Jakob-Wassermann-Literaturpreis (lit. 'Jakob Wassermann Literature Prize') is a Bavarian literary prize. It is granted in honour to the famous Jewish German writer Jakob Wassermann by the city of Fürth (near Nuremberg) and comes with a donation of 10,000 euros. The prize was established in 1995.

== Recipients ==
- 1996: Edgar Hilsenrath
- 1999: Hilde Domin
- 2002: Dagmar Nick
- 2004: Sten Nadolny
- 2006: Uwe Timm
- 2007: Robert Schindel
- 2008: Roberto Schopflocher
- 2010: Feridun Zaimoglu
- 2012: Gerhard Roth
- 2014: Urs Widmer
- 2016: Gila Lustiger
- 2018: Barbara Honigmann
- 2020: Clemens J. Setz
- 2023: Eva Menasse
