= Gerhard Roth =

Austrian writer (1942–2022)

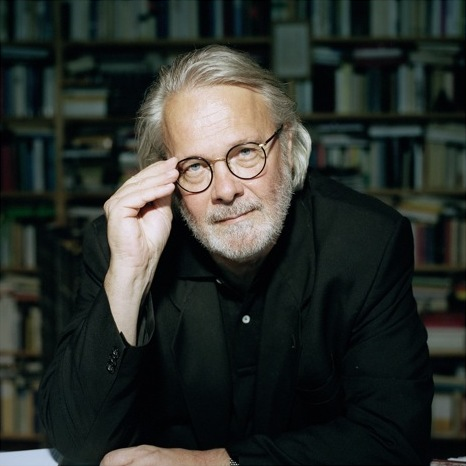
- Roth in 2012
- Born: 24 June 1942; Graz, Austria, Germany
- Died: 8 February 2022 (aged 79); Graz, Austria
- Occupation: Writer

Gerhard Roth (24 June 1942 – 8 February 2022) was an Austrian writer.

== Life ==
Roth was born in Graz. The son of a medical practitioner, Roth, too, originally wanted to study medicine himself, but soon turned his attention to literature. Initially, he earned his living as a computer programmer.

He was a freelance writer from 1976. From 1973 to 1978, he was member of the Grazer Autorenversammlung before he moved to Hamburg in 1979. Since 1986, he divided his time between Vienna and Styria.

He won many literature prizes, among which are the literature prize of Styria (1976), the Alfred Döblin Prize (1983), and the Bruno-Kreisky-Prize (2002). In 1995, he was awarded the Golden Romy for his screenplay of Schnellschuss. He was also the recipient of the 2012 Jakob-Wassermann-Literaturpreis.

Roth died on 8 February 2022, at the age of 79.

== Work ==
Roth referred to himself as "someone obsessed with writing in the best sense." In the focus is the hero, struggling in vain, to whom the world appears to be a torturous, intolerable state. Often Roth externally couched his writings in the form of a crime novel, in which he emphasised the unravelling of the hidden, in a figurative sense.

The focus of his main opus, Die Archive des Schweigens, is the re-appraisal of Austrian history in today's political and social systems.

== Writings ==
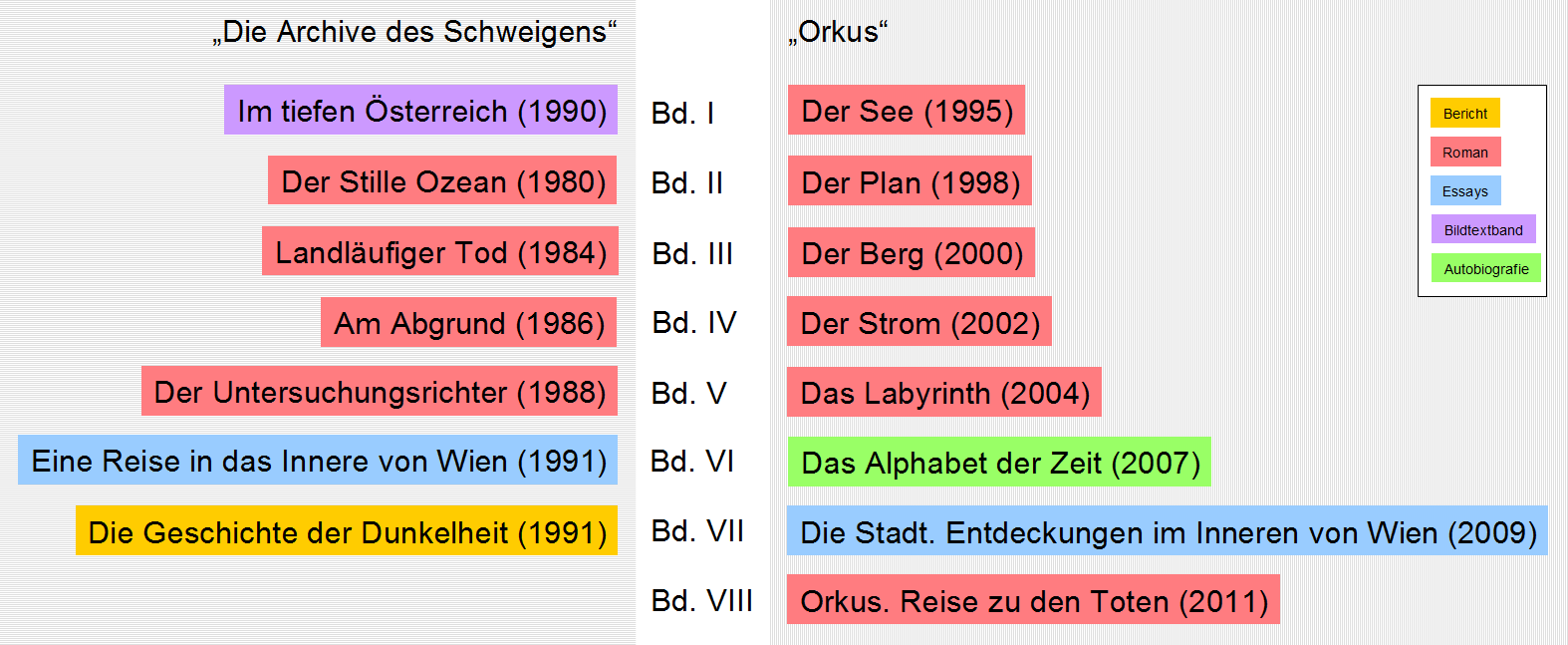
Two cycles of Gerhard Roth novels

- Die Archive des Schweigens. Cycle of novels with the following parts:
  - Der Stille Ozean, 1980
  - Landläufiger Tod, 1984
  - Am Abgrund, 1986
  - Der Untersuchungsrichter, 1988
  - Im tiefen Österreich, 1990
  - Die Geschichte der Dunkelheit, 1991
  - Eine Reise in das Innere von Wien, 1991
- Novels:
  - die autobiographie des albert einstein, 1972
  - Der Wille zur Krankheit, 1973
  - Der große Horizont, 1974
  - Ein neuer Morgen, 1976
  - Winterreise, 1978
  - Die schönen Bilder beim Trabrennen, 1982
  - Der See, 1995
  - Der Plan, 1998
  - Der Berg, 2000
  - Der Strom, 2002
  - Das Labyrinth, 2004
  - Das Alphabet der Zeit, 2007
- Narrations
  - Der Ausbruch des Weltkriegs, 1972
  - Circus Saluti, 1981
  - Das Töten des Bussards, 1982
- Dramas
  - Lichtenberg, 1973
  - Sehnsucht, 1977
  - Dämmerung, 1978
  - Erinnerungen an die Menschheit, 1985
  - Franz Lindner und er selber, 1987
  - Fremd in Wien, 1993
- Autobiography
  - Das Alphabet der Zeit, August 2007
- Essays
  - Über Bienen. (German/Japanese; with photos by Franz Killmeyer). Folio, Wien und Bozen 1996.
  - Das doppelköpfige Österreich, 1995
  - Gsellmanns Weltmaschine (with Franz Killmeyer)
- several radio dramas and screenplays (in some cases of his own novels)
- Translations
  - Between Heaven and Hell [excerpt from Landläufiger Tod)], in Black Letters Unleashed, trans. Malcolm green, Atlas Press, London, 1989
  - the autobiography of albert einstein, trans. malcolm green, Atlas Press, London, 1992
  - On the Brink [Am Abgrund], with illustrations by Günter Brus, trans. malcolm green, Atlas Press, 2006

== Bibliography ==
All references are in German.

- P. Ensberg und H. Schreckenberger: G. Roth, 1994;
- M. Baltl (Ed.): G. Roth, 1995;
- U. Schütte: Auf der Spur der Vergessenen. G. Roth und seine Archive des Schweigens, 1997.
