= Erwin Walter Palm =

German historian (1910–1988

Erwin Walter Palm (28 August 1910 – 7 July 1988) was a German Latin American scholar, historian, and writer.

== Early years ==
Palm was born 28 August 1910 in Frankfurt am Main, in a house that was located near today's Suhrkamp house. He is the only survivor of the Holocaust from his family, his relatives having been murdered by the Nazi regime. Palm studied archaeology at the University of Heidelberg, where he met a fellow student who would become his wife, Hilde Löwenstein (later known as Hilde Palm, and since 1959 as Hilde Domin).

== Exile ==
Particularly receptive to the malicious developments taking place in Nazi Germany, the couple fled to Italy in 1932 to escape the growing anti-Semitism. They married in 1936, and lived first in Florence and then in Rome. Because of the rapprochement between Adolf Hitler and Benito Mussolini, Hitler's visit to Rome, and the acrimonious atmosphere of fascist Italy, the pair once again emigrated in 1939, this time to England.

== Santo Domingo ==
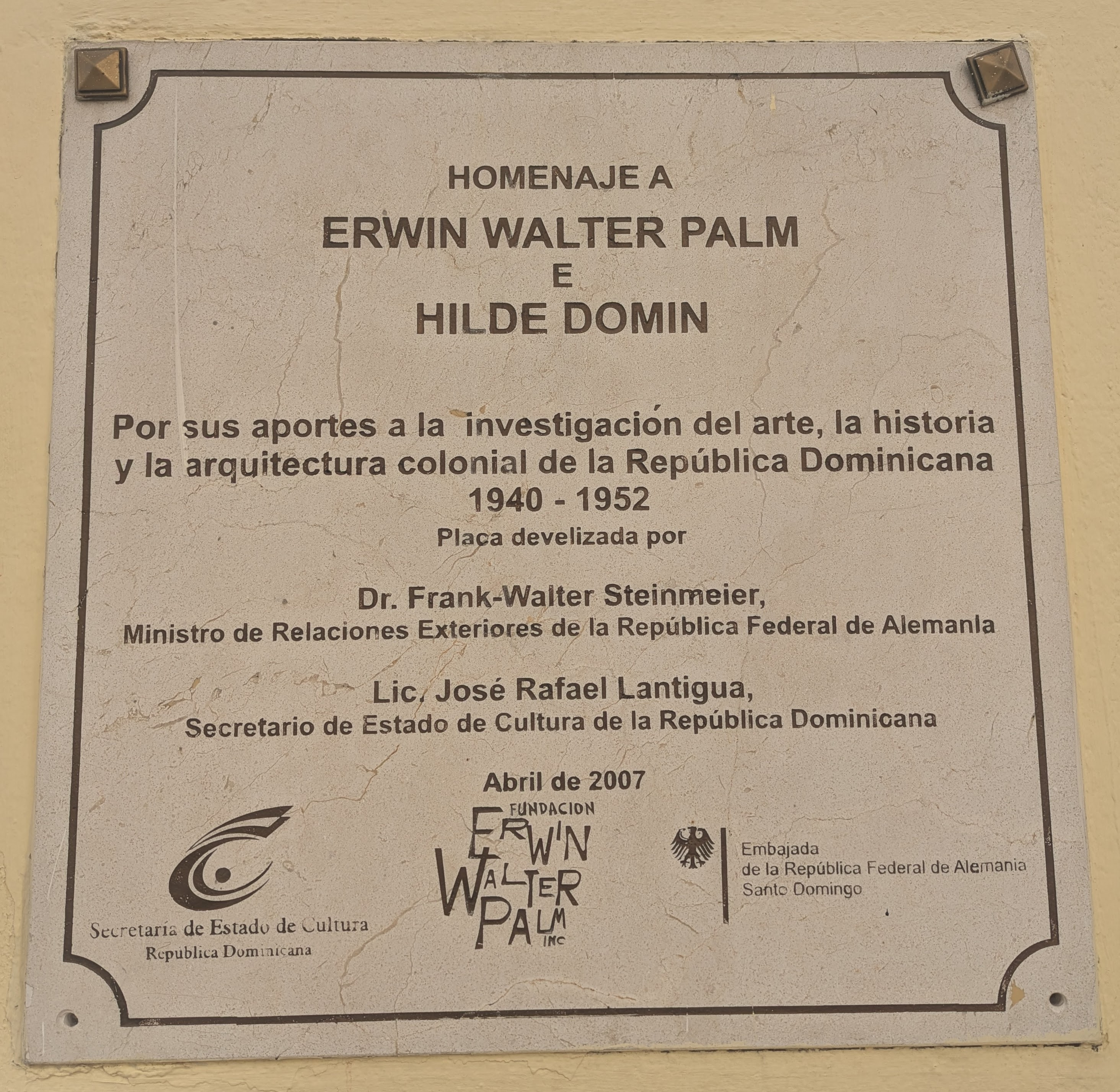
Commemorative Plaque for Erwin Walter Palm and Hilde Domin

However, their fears of the Nazi menace did not wane, and the couple tried frenetically to emigrate across the Atlantic. None of their preferred choices—the United States, Mexico, Argentina and Brazil—granted them a visa, while some charged them exorbitant sums of money which they didn't have. The only country to unconditionally welcome them was the Dominican Republic. There, they arrived in the port of San Pedro de Macorís in the summer of 1940.

In Santo Domingo—where they lived for 14 years—Palm worked as a historian and lecturer at the University of Santo Domingo, while his wife Hilde became a photographer of architecture. (She would later on become a writer, adopting the name Hilde Domin in 1959, in honor of the city which gave her refuge.) He quickly became established as one of the leading experts in his field, and elevated the population's pride in their history to an academic standard.

In 1950, he masterminded and curated a pivotal exhibit of Colonial Art that for the first time gathered and interpreted the limited artifacts still remaining from the period when Santo Domingo was the capital of the New World. He properly catalogued the treasures of America's oldest cathedral (Catedral de Santa María la Menor, est 1536), as well as many artifacts from private collections. This exhibit was influential in developing a collective consciousness among Dominicans in regards to their Spanish past. It helped spark a hitherto unseen interest in colonial architecture that among other things, led to the revalorization and subsequent restoration of the old city district.

Palm's research on the Ciudad Colonial (Colonial City) of Santo Domingo— Europe's oldest American city, established in 1502—culminated in his work "Los monumentos arquitectónicos de la Española, con una introducción a América" (The Architectural Monuments of Hispaniola, with an Introduction to America, University of Santo Domingo Press, 1955) an in-depth analysis of the art and architecture of this historical city. His wife Hilde took the accompanying photographs. Their work was instrumental in securing the Government's bid before UNESCO which granted World Heritage Site status to the entire Old City of Santo Domingo in 1990.

== Return to Germany ==
The Palms returned to Germany in 1954, first settling in Frankfurt/Main, then in Heidelberg, where he was appointed lecturer of Spanish American Art and Culture at the University of Heidelberg in 1960. He remained there until his retirement.

Palm excelled as a professor in his chosen area of Pre-Columbian, Portuguese and Spanish colonial art. He continued his special bond with Santo Domingo, publishing "Arquitectura y Arte Colonial en Santo Domingo (Architecture and Colonial Art in Santo Domingo, Universidad Autónoma de Santo Domingo) in 1978. He was among other things a member of the Academia Mexicana de las Artes. In 1988 he was distinguished by the University of Augsburg with the university price for Spain and Latin American studies.

As a writer, Palm wrote poetry and also edited and translated Spanish American poetry into German. His anthology "Rose aus Asche. Spanische und Spanisch-Amerikanische Lyrik seit 1900" (Rose from Ashes. Spanish and Spanish American Poetry since 1900) ranks among its most well known books. His lifelong predilection for his years in Santo Domingo are evident in his choice of poets: out of 12 poets form Latin America, including famous ones like Gabriela Mistral (Chile), César Vallejo (Peru), and José Lezama Lima (Cuba), Palm included two Dominican poets: Moreno Jiménes (Dominican Republic) and Héctor Incháustegui Cabral.

Erwin Walter palm died on 7 July 1988 in Heidelberg. He is celebrated in the Dominican Republic for his achievements in advancing scholarly research of the history and architecture of the early colonial period. In Santo Domingo, the Fundación Palm—whose mission is to study and promote Dominican patrimony, especially architecture, urbanism, and literature—was established in his honor. In Germany, he served as a bridge, introducing Germans to Iberian American and Spanish art, architecture, and literature.

== See also ==
Hilde Domin
