= Michael Kumpfmüller =

German writer and former journalist

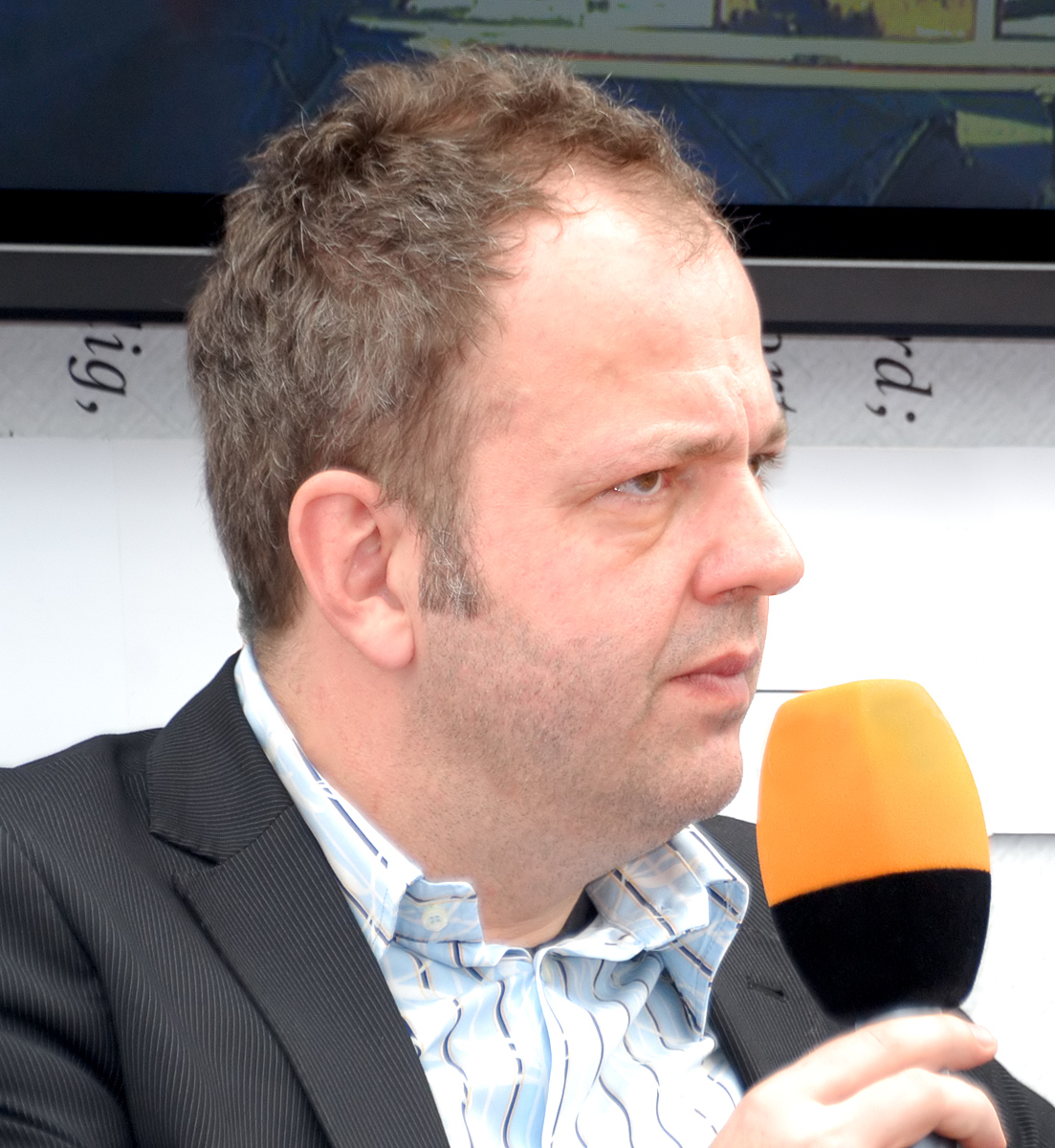
- Born: 21 July 1961 (age 65); Munich, Germany
- Occupation: Novelist
- Writing career
- Period: 2000–present

Michael Kumpfmüller (born 21 July 1961) is a German writer and former journalist.

== Biography ==
Kumpfmüller, born in Munich, was raised in Unterschleißheim near Munich. After graduating from high school in Garching in 1980, he moved to Tübingen. He attended the Leibniz Kolleg for a one-year course in General studies. He studied history and German literature at the University of Tübingen from 1981 to 1984, at the University of Vienna from 1984 to 1986, and at the Free University of Berlin from 1987 to 1990. From 1990 to 1994 he was a Ph.D. student. His dissertation with the title Die Schlacht von Stalingrad (English: The Battle of Stalingrad) studied the treatment of the battle of Stalingrad in literary and non-literary texts since 1942. From 1996 to 1998 he worked as a research fellow at the Free University of Berlin in a project on literary intellectuality and media.

Since 1985, he has worked as a freelance journalist, writing mostly about labor, war and religion. He started as an intern for the public broadcaster Bayerischer Rundfunk and worked mostly for the radio. Since 1990 he has mostly written for newspapers and magazines, as for example Die Zeit, Neue Zürcher Zeitung, Frankfurter Allgemeine Zeitung, Süddeutsche Zeitung and the Frankfurter Rundschau. Since 2000 he has been a freelance writer.

During the 2005 German federal election, Kumpfmüller became a member of an informal civic initiative founded by Günter Grass which supported the incumbent coalition of Social Democrats and The Greens. Shortly after the election Kumpfmüller became a member of the literary association "Lübecker Literaturtreffen" (also known as "Lübeck 05", "Gruppe 06" or "Gruppe Lübeck 05"), an informal group of German authors and writers.

From April to November 2006, Kumpfmüller was a literary fellow in six cities in Lower Saxony, writing and commenting on current events. In 2007 he was awarded the Alfred Döblin Prize for his not yet published novel Nachricht an alle (English: "Message to all").

Kumpfmüller was married to Eva Menasse and has lived in Berlin since 1986.

== Work ==
His first novel Hampels Fluchten was published in advance by the Frankfurter Allgemeine Zeitung in 2000 and later translated into Dutch, English, Finnish and French. The English version The Adventures of a Bed Salesman was translated by Anthea Bell. Hampels Fluchten tells the story of thirty-year-old womanizer and bed salesman Heinrich Hampel who flees from West Germany to East Germany to avoid high debts. Far from beginning a new life, he continues his old lavish and promiscuous lifestyle, working as police informer for the Stasi and dealing on the black market. The book's protagonist Heinrich Hampel serves as a symbol for the complexities of inner-German relations in times of the Cold War.

In 2003 Kumpfmüller published the novel Durst (English: Thirst) about a woman who abandons her two children in the midsummer with only a small juice carton left in the apartment. The novel was inspired by a real case of negligent homicide that happened in 1999 in Frankfurt (Oder).

== Bibliography ==
- Durst. Kiepenheuer & Witsch, Cologne, August 2003. ISBN 978-3-462-03316-8
- Hampels Fluchten. Kiepenheuer & Witsch, Cologne, August 2000. ISBN 978-3-462-02927-7
- "Die Schlacht von Stalingrad: Metamorphosen eines deutschen Mythos. Wilhelm Fink Verlag, Munich, 1995. ISBN 978-3-7705-3078-6
- Editor of "Der wunderbare Hund". Friedenauer Presse, Berlin, November 2000. ISBN 978-3-921592-78-6
