= Heinrich-Böll-Preis =

Literary prize of Germany, awarded by the City of Cologne

Heinrich Böll Prize for Literature German: Heinrich-Böll-Preis
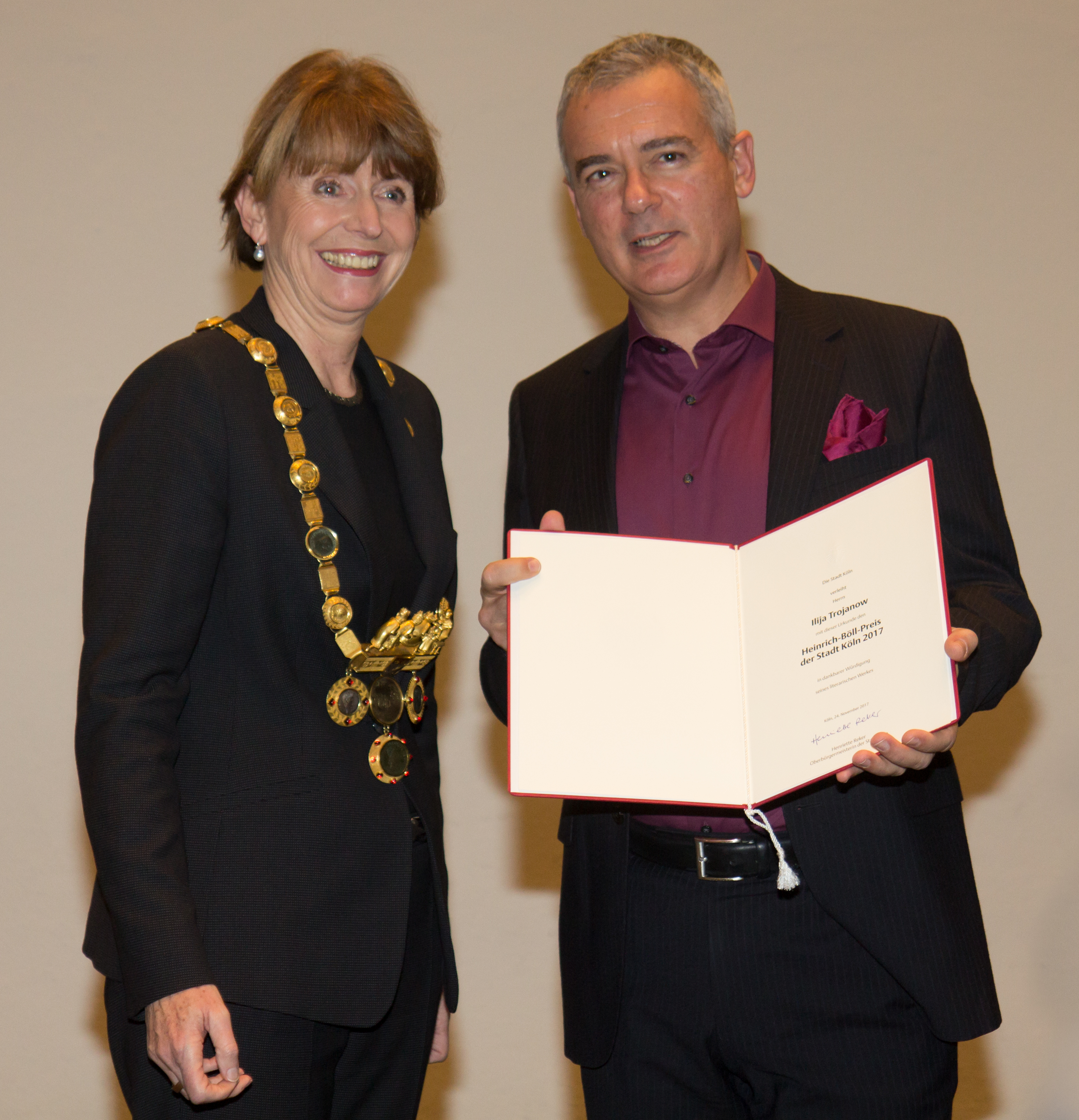
- Award ceremony in 2017, Ilija Trojanow
- Awarded for: outstanding achievements in the field of German literature
- Country: Germany
- Presented by: City of Cologne
- Reward: €30,000
- First award: 1980
- Website: www.friedenspreis-des-deutschen-buchhandels.de (in German and English)

The Heinrich-Böll-Preis (Heinrich Böll Prize for Literature) is a literary prize of Germany, awarded by the City of Cologne in memory of Nobel Prize winner Heinrich Böll. The prize money is €30,000. The prize is awarded "for outstanding achievements – even by still unknown authors – in the field of German-language literature".

== Recipients ==
- 1980: Hans Mayer
- 1981: Peter Weiss
- 1982: Wolfdietrich Schnurre
- 1983: Uwe Johnson
- 1984: Helmut Heißenbüttel
- 1985: Hans Magnus Enzensberger
- 1986: Elfriede Jelinek
- 1987: Ludwig Harig
- 1988: Dieter Wellershoff
- 1989: Brigitte Kronauer
- 1990: Günter de Bruyn
- 1991: Rainald Goetz
- 1992: Hans Joachim Schädlich
- 1993: Alexander Kluge
- 1995: Jürgen Becker
- 1997: W. G. Sebald
- 1999: Gerhard Meier
- 2001: Marcel Beyer
- 2003: Anne Duden
- 2005: Ralf Rothmann
- 2007: Christoph Ransmayr
- 2009: Uwe Timm
- 2011: Ulrich Peltzer
- 2013: Eva Menasse
- 2015: Herta Müller
- 2017: Ilija Trojanow
- 2019: Juli Zeh
- 2021: José F. A. Oliver
- 2023: Kathrin Röggla
- 2025: Heike Geißler
