= Eva Menasse =

Austrian author and journalist

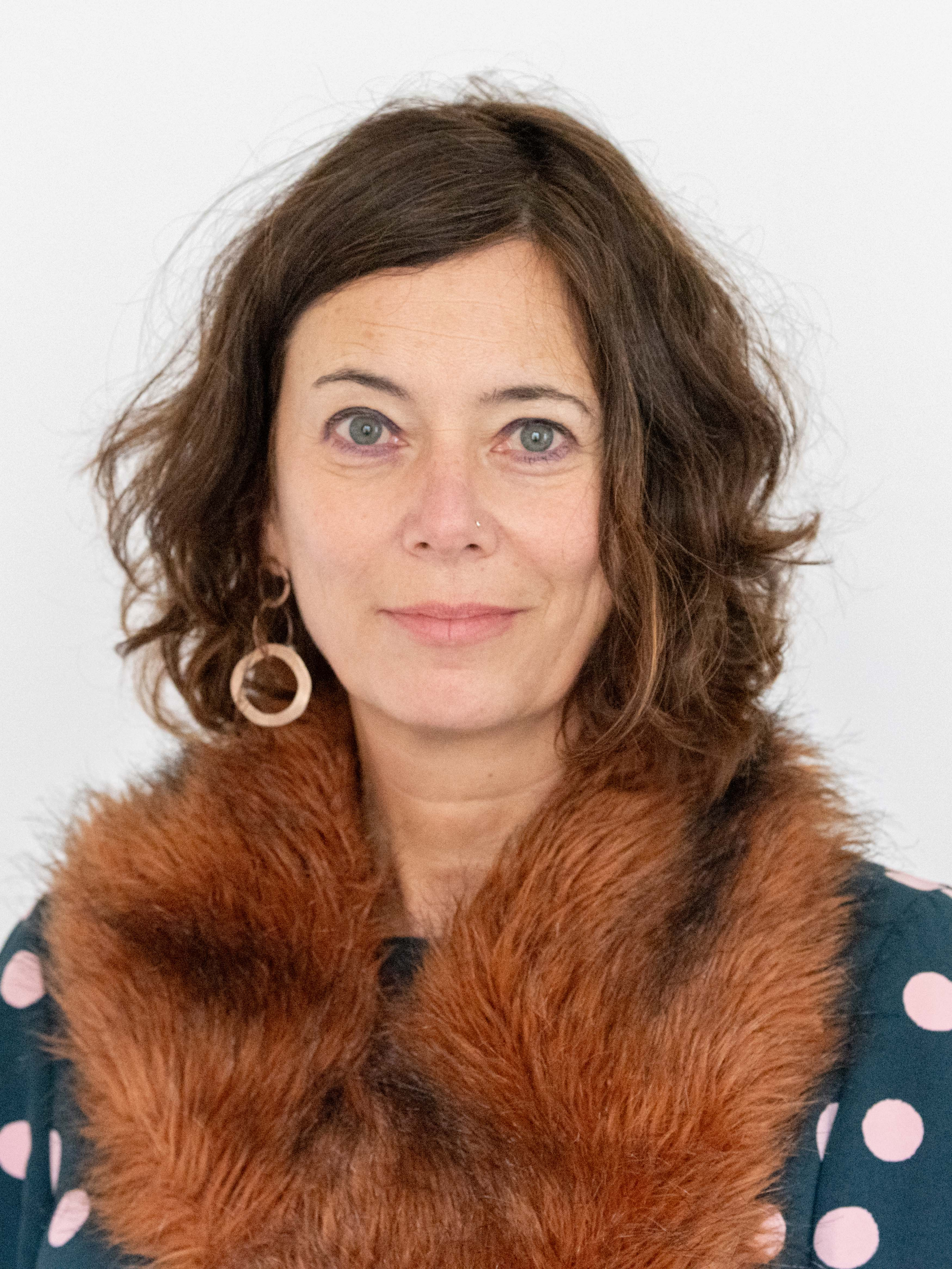
- Born: 11 May 1970; Vienna
- Alma mater: University of Vienna
- Occupation: Writer, journalist
- Spouse(s): Michael Kumpfmüller
- Parent(s): Hans Menasse
- Relatives: Robert Menasse
- Awards: Heinrich-Böll-Preis (2013); Austrian book prize (2017); Alpha literary award (2014); Mainzer Stadtschreiber (2019); Ludwig Börne Prize (2019); Friedrich-Hölderlin-Preis (2017); Jonathan Swift Award (2015); Jakob-Wassermann-Literaturpreis (2023); Rome Prize of the German Academy Villa Massimo (2015–2016); Ehrenpreis des österreichischen Buchhandels für Toleranz in Denken und Handeln (2025)

Eva Menasse (born 11 May 1970 in Vienna) is an Austrian author and journalist. She has studied history and German literature. Menasse had a successful career as a journalist, writing for the Frankfurter Allgemeine Zeitung in Frankfurt and as a correspondent from Prague and Berlin. She left the paper to write her first novel, Vienna, and now lives and works in Berlin as a freelance author.

In 2005, she received the Corine Literature Prize. The English translation of her novel Vienna was shortlisted for the 2007 Independent Foreign Fiction Prize in the UK.

Menasse was married to the German author Michael Kumpfmüller from 2004 to 2017. She is the half-sibling of writer Robert Menasse.

== Awards ==
- 2013 Heinrich-Böll-Preis
- 2015 Villa Massimo Scholarship in Rome
- 2015 Jonathan-Swift-Preis
- 2017 Friedrich-Hölderlin-Preis
- 2017 Austrian Book Prize
- 2019 Ludwig Börne Prize
- 2019 Mainzer Stadtschreiber
- 2023 Jakob-Wassermann-Literaturpreis

== Works ==
- Die letzte Märchenprinzessin, (with Elisabeth and Robert Menasse), 1997
- Klein Menasses der mächtigste Mann, (with Elisabeth and Robert Menasse), 1998
- Der Holocaust vor Gericht. Der Prozess um David Irving, 2000
- Vienna, novel, 2005 (English: Vienna, translated by Anthea Bell, 2006)
- Lässliche Todsünden, short stories, 2009
- Quasikristalle, novel, 2013
- Lieber aufgeregt als abgeklärt, essays, 2015
- Tiere für Fortgeschrittene, short stories, 2017
- Gedankenspiele über den Kompromiss, essay, 2020
- Geborgen am Busen der Musen. Früher oder später bekommt das Museum uns alle, essay, 2020
- Dunkelblum, novel, 2021 (English, Darkenbloom, translated by Charlotte Collins, 2025)
