= Libuše Moníková =

Czech writer (1945–1998)

Libuše Moníková (30 August 1945 in Prague – 12 January 1998 in Berlin) was a Czech writer, publishing in German language. In 1968, following the Warsaw Pact invasion of Czechoslovakia, she left to West Germany.

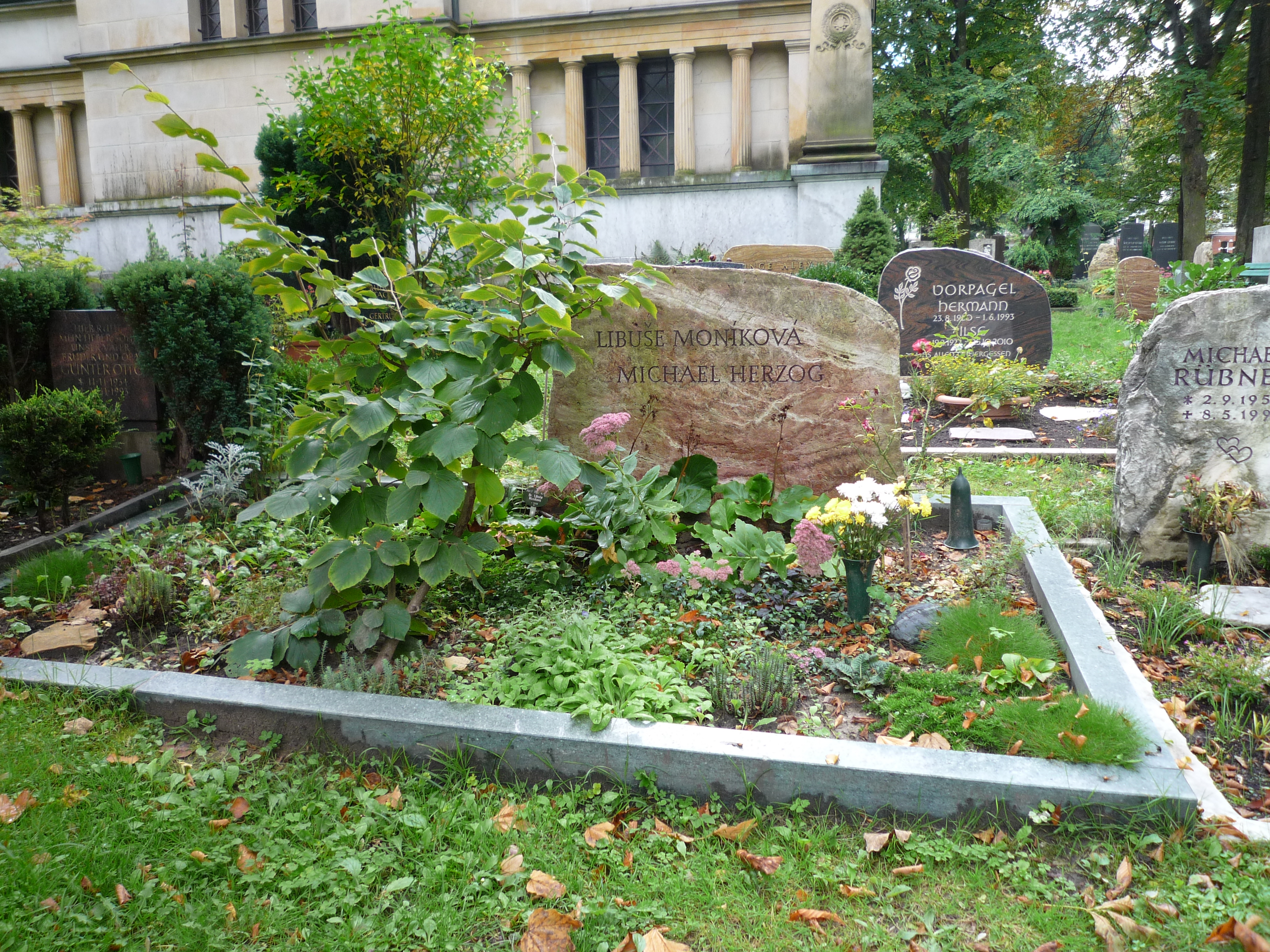
Grave of Libuše Moníková at Alter St.-Matthäus-Kirchhof, Berlin

== Awards ==
- 1987: Alfred Döblin Prize for Die Fassade.
- 1989: Franz Kafka Prize (Klosterneuberg)
- 1991, Adelbert von Chamisso Prize.
- 1993: Vilenica Literature Prize
- 1994: Mainzer Stadtschreiber
- 1995: Roswitha Prize
- 1997: Medal of Merit (Czech Republic)
- 1997: Cross of Merit (Germany)

== Works ==
=== Novels ===
- Eine Schädigung. Rotbuch, Berlin 1981, ISBN 3-88022-246-0; Hanser, München 2003, ISBN 3-446-19527-0.
- Pavane für eine verstorbene Infantin. Rotbuch, Berlin 1983, dtv, München 1988, ISBN 3-423-10960-2.
- Die Fassade. Hanser, München 1987 ISBN 3-446-14884-1
- Schloß, Aleph, Wunschtorte. Hanser, München 1990, ISBN 3-446-15399-3.
- Treibeis. Hanser, München 1992, ISBN 3-446-17254-8 (s. Ludwig Wittgenstein: Literarische Rezeption).
- Prager Fenster. Hanser, München 1994, ISBN 3-446-17846-5.
- Verklärte Nacht. Hanser, München Wien 1996, ISBN 3-446-18762-6.
- Der Taumel. Fragment. Mit einem Nachwort von Michael Krüger. Hanser, München Wien, 2000. - Teilw. Vorabdruck: Jakub Brandl. in: Akzente 1997, H. 6., S. 512–536.

=== Plays ===
- Tetom und Tuba. Frankfurt am Main 1987.
- Unter Menschenfressern. Dramatisches Menue in vier Gängen. Verlag der Autoren, Frankfurt am Main 1990, ISBN 978-3-88661-104-1
