= Elke Hartmann-Puls =

German ancient historian

Elke Hartmann-Puls (March 24, 1969 Munich - July 21, 2021 Berlin) was a German ancient historian.

== Life and work ==
Hartmann studied ancient history, modern history and classical archaeology at the Free University of Berlin from 1988 to 1995, where she then worked as a research assistant for ancient history at the Friedrich Meinecke Institute (part of the Free University of Berlin) from 1996 to 2002. In the summer of 2000, she received her doctorate with a thesis supervised by Peter Spahn on Marriage, Hetärentum und Konkubinat im klassischen Athen.

From 2002 to February 2010, she taught at the Humboldt University of Berlin as a junior academic in ancient history with a special focus on gender history. She gave her inaugural lecture in February 2004 on the history of the matriarchy. In Berlin, she was also a member of the Center for Transdisciplinary Gender Studies. In the winter semester 2008/09 and in the summer semester 2009 she substituted for Wilfried Nippel at Humboldt University; in the summer semester of 2010 she substituted at the FU Berlin and in the summer semester 2011 at the University of Heidelberg. In October 2011, she was appointed Professor of Ancient History at the Technical University of Darmstadt.

Hartmann died in July 2021 after a serious illness at the age of 52. She was succeeded by Susanne Froehlich in 2023.

Her research focused on the cultural and gender history of antiquity, couple relationships in classical Athens, women in antiquity and the social history of the Roman imperial period. She published an overview of women in antiquity in 2007, the second edition of which appeared in 2021.

== Writings (selection) ==
=== Monographs ===
- Heirat, Hetärentum und Konkubinat im klassischen Athen (= Campus historische Studien. Vol. 30). Campus, Frankfurt am Main 2002, ISBN 3-593-37007-7.
- Zur Geschichte der Matriarchatsidee (= Öffentliche Vorlesungen. Vol. 133). Humboldt University, Berlin 2004, ISBN 3-86004-178-9 (Digitalisat).
- Frauen in der Antike. Weibliche Lebenswelten von Sappho bis Theodora. 2nd, revised and updated edition. Beck, Munich 2021, ISBN 978-3-406-76657-2.
- Ordnung in Unordnung. Kommunikation, Konsum und Konkurrenz in der stadtrömischen Gesellschaft der frühen Kaiserzeit. Steiner, Stuttgart 2016, ISBN 978-3-515-11362-5.

=== Editorships ===
- with Udo Hartmann, Katrin Pietzner: Geschlechterdefinitionen und Geschlechtergrenzen in der Antike. Steiner, Stuttgart 2007, ISBN 3-515-08996-9.
- with Sven Page, Anabelle Thurn: Moral als Kapital im antiken Athen und Rom. Steiner, Stuttgart 2018, ISBN 978-3-515-12077-7.
