= Helene Adler =

German author (1849–1923)

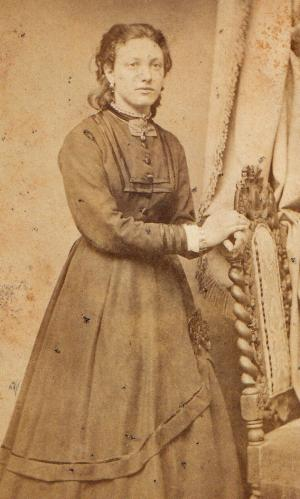
- Born: 5 December 1849; Frankfurt am Main, German Confederation
- Died: 2 December 1923 (aged 73); Frankfurt am Main, German Republic
- Occupations: Educator, writer, poet
- Writing career
- Language: German (Hessian dialect)

Helene Adler was a German Jewish educator, writer, and poet.

== Biography ==
Helene Adler was born in Frankfurt in 1849, in the same house in which Ludwig Börne was born, and which was the property of her father, a minor officer of the Frankfurt Jewish community. She attended the Philanthropin until 1865, and graduated from the Wiesbaden Women's College in 1867. For fifteen years she was a teacher in the school of the Waisenschule des israelitischen Frauenvereins in her native city.

Adler gave up teaching in 1882 due to her declining health, and thereafter devoted herself entirely to literature. She published that year her first collection of poetry, Beim Kuckuck. In the following years she published poems and pedagogical essays in various newspapers and journals.

She was a proponent of pacifism during the First World War.

== Selected works ==
- Beim Kuckuck. Launige zoopoetische Waldgesänge. Frankfurt am Main: Erras. 1882.
- Religion und Moral. Ein Beitrag zur Erziehungsfrage vom Standpunkte der Schopenhauerschen Ethik. Gotha: Stollberg. 1882.
- Über Waisenerziehung. Frankfurt am Main: Erras. 1885.
- Vorreden und Bruchstücke. Eine poetische Musterkarte. Frankfurt am Main: Staudt. 1897.
- "Fridde uff Erde!" Gardinepreddigt von Settchen Hampelmann, Borgesfrää in Frankfort am Mää an die sechs Großmächt in ochsidendalisch-ohrjendalische Aagelegenheite. 1897.
- Poetische Schatten, den Manen Arthur Schopenhauers geweiht. Buch 1: Anakreon. Leipzig: Cavael. 1912.
- Studentenlieder und akademische Gesänge. Leipzig: Xenien-Verlag. 1914.
