= Ilse Blumenthal-Weiss =

German poet

- Born: Ilse Weiss; 14 October 1899; Berlin, Germany
- Died: 10 August 1987 (aged 87); Greenwich, Connecticut, U.S.
- Occupation: Poet
- Writing career
- Period: 1929–1984

Ilse Blumenthal-Weiss (14 October 1899 – 10 August 1987) was a German poet. A survivor of Westerbork and Theresienstadt concentration camps, she wrote largely about the Holocaust.

== Biography ==
Ilse Weiss was born on 14 October 1899 in Berlin to Gottlieb Weiss, a clothing store owner, and Hedwig Weiss-Brock. She married Herbert Blumenthal, a dentist, in 1929. She trained to become a teacher in physical education and worked as an orthopedic specialist, although she had also written poetry from a young age. She published her first volume of poems, Gesicht und Maske ("Face and Mask"), in 1929. She corresponded with the Austrian poet Rainer Maria Rilke, and their letters were published in Briefe aus Muzot in 1935.

In 1937, being Jewish, Blumenthal-Weiss fled Nazi Germany. She moved to the Netherlands, but she and her daughter, Miriam, were eventually deported to Westerbork and then Theresienstadt concentration camp in 1944. Her husband and son, Peter, were killed in the Auschwitz and Mauthausen concentration camps respectively. In 1947, after the war, Blumenthal-Weiss and her daughter emigrated to the United States, settling in New York City.

While living in New York, she published three more collections of poetry: Das Schlüsselwunder (1954; "The Key Miracle"), Mahnmal (1957; "Memorial"), and Ohnesarg (1984; "Coffinless"). Most of the poems contained therein focused on the Holocaust and its victims. She also worked as a librarian at the Leo Baeck Institute, New York. She died on 10 August 1987 in Greenwich, Connecticut.

== Works ==
- Gesicht und Maske, 1929
- Das Schlüsselwunder, 1954
- Mahnmal. Gedichte aus dem KZ, Hamburg 1956
- Ohnesarg. Gedichte und ein dokumentarischer Bericht, Hannover 1984
