= Ilse Gräfin von Bredow =

German author (1922–2014)

Ilse Gräfin von Bredow (July 5, 1922, in Teichenau, Silesia – April 20, 2014, in Hamburg) was a German writer.

== Biography ==
She was the third and youngest child of Sigismund Count von Bredow (1890–1970) and his wife Ursula, née von Lieres and Wilkau (1881–1966). Her older siblings were Wilkin Count von Bredow (1918–1988) and Josepha Countess von Bredow, later married Freifrau von Zedlitz and Leipe (1919–2011). The family lived in the forester's lodge in Lochow, today part of the municipality of Stechow-Ferchesar, in Havelland.

As a teenager Ilse Gräfin von Bredow attended a boarding school. During the World War II she was in the Reich Labor Service. Shortly before the end of the war, her family fled from Brandenburg to Lower Saxony. She lived in Hamburg from the early 1950s. Countess von Bredow worked for newspapers and magazines as a freelancer and wrote reportages and short stories. Many of her works reflect her origins.

Her first book Kartoffeln mit Stippe was published by Scherz Verlag in 1979, went through several editions and was filmed as a three-part series by ZDF in 1990.

== Works ==
Fiction

- Ein Bernhardiner namens Möpschen und andere Erinnerungen an eine glückliche Kindheit in der Mark Brandenburg. Neuaufl. Weltbild-Verlag, Augsburg 2010. ISBN 978-3-86800-622-3.
- Kartoffeln mit Stippe. Eine Kindheit in der Märkischen Heide. Piper, München 2002. ISBN 978-3-492-22915-9. Als Goldmann Taschenbuch 1982, ISBN 3-442-06393-0. (Platz 1 der Spiegel-Bestsellerliste vom 2. April bis zum 26. August 1979)
- Deine Keile kriegste doch. Mädchenerinnerungen an eine verlorene Heimat. Scherz Verlag, München 1981. ISBN 978-3-5021-1069-9.
- Ein Fräulein von und zu. Geschichten aus ganz normalen Kreisen. Scherz Verlag, München 1992. ISBN 978-3-5021-1070-5.
- Glückskinder. Roman einer märkischen Adelsfamilie. Scherz Verlag, München 1990, ISBN 978-3-5021-1071-2.
- Der Spatz in der Hand. Roman. Piper, München 2004, ISBN 3-492-22917-4.
- Willst du glücklich sein im Leben … Geschichten von gestern, Geschichten von heute. Piper, München 2007. ISBN 978-3-492-24982-9.
- Denn Engel wohnen nebenan. Rückkehr in die märkische Heide; Roman. Scherz Verlag, München 1995. ISBN 3-502-11076-X.
- Ich und meine Oma und die Liebe. Weihnachtsgeschichten. Piper, München 2006. ISBN 978-3-492-24815-0.
- Der Glückspilz und andere Überlebensgeschichten. Piper, München 2004. ISBN 3-492-24087-9.
- Denn im Herbst, da fall’n die Blätter – Donnerwetter! Geschichten vom Lande. Piper, München 2006. ISBN 978-3-492-24483-1.
- Adel vom Feinsten. Amüsante Geschichten aus vornehmen Kreisen. Piper, München 2007. ISBN 978-3-492-24484-8.
- Was dem Herzen gefällt. Scherz Verlag, Frankfurt/M. 2007. ISBN 978-3-502-11041-5.
- Das Hörgerät im Azaleentopf. Piper, München 2011. ISBN 978-3-492-25950-7.
- Mein Körper ist so unsozial. Piper, München 2015. ISBN 978-3-492-30582-2.

Non-fiction

- „Gieß Wasser in die Suppe, heiß alle willkommen". Die Küche meiner Kindheit im Sommer. Scherz Verlag, München 2001. ISBN 3-502-11083-2.
- Die Küche meiner Kindheit. Geschichten und Rezepte. Piper, München 2004, ISBN 3-492-24017-8.

== Film adaptations ==
- Gabriele Unterberg (director): Ein Bernhardiner namens Möpschen. 1996 (based on the novel of the same name)
- Franz Josef Gottlieb (director): Kartoffeln mit Stippe. 1990 (three-part television movie based on the novel of the same name)

== Literature ==
- Alexandra zu Knyphausen: Die Alten werden sich noch wundern. She came by bike from the Mark Brandenburg, landed in Hamburg – and wrote bestsellers. In: Hamburger Abendblatt Vol. 50 (1997), No. 297 from December 20/21.
