= Herma Studeny =

German violin virtuoso and composer

Herma Studeny (4 January 1886 - 28 June 1973) was a German violin virtuoso, composer, and author who is best remembered today for writing the Book of the Violin.

Studeny was born in Munich to Hermine Niemeczek and medical doctor Alfred S. Studeny. She married the painter Julius Nitsche in 1921.

Studeny made her debut as a violinist in 1903. She attended the Prague Conservatory, where she studied with Antonin Dvorak and Otakar Sevcik, and later with Richard Schrammel. Studeny’s students included Joseph “Nipso” Brantner, Juan Wolfgang Granat, Herbert Hirschmann, Michael Mann, and Gerhard Seitz.

Studeny said that her “credo” was three bars of the Chaconne from Bach’s Partita No. 2. She performed as a soloist, and also formed the Studeny String Quartet in Munich with Alf Beckmann, Lotte Harburger, and Karl List. Guenter Henle sometimes accompanied her on the piano. Her performing career slowed after World War II when she was accused of belonging to the Third Reich’s Chamber of Music, but she eventually resumed performing.

Studeny’s violin book was published by Gustav Bosse. Her publications include:

== Books ==
- Book of the Violin
- Glass Mountain: From My Life
- Mintrels’ Ways: Poems

== Music ==
- Four Suites for Violin
