= Sebastian Bleisch =

German writer and historian

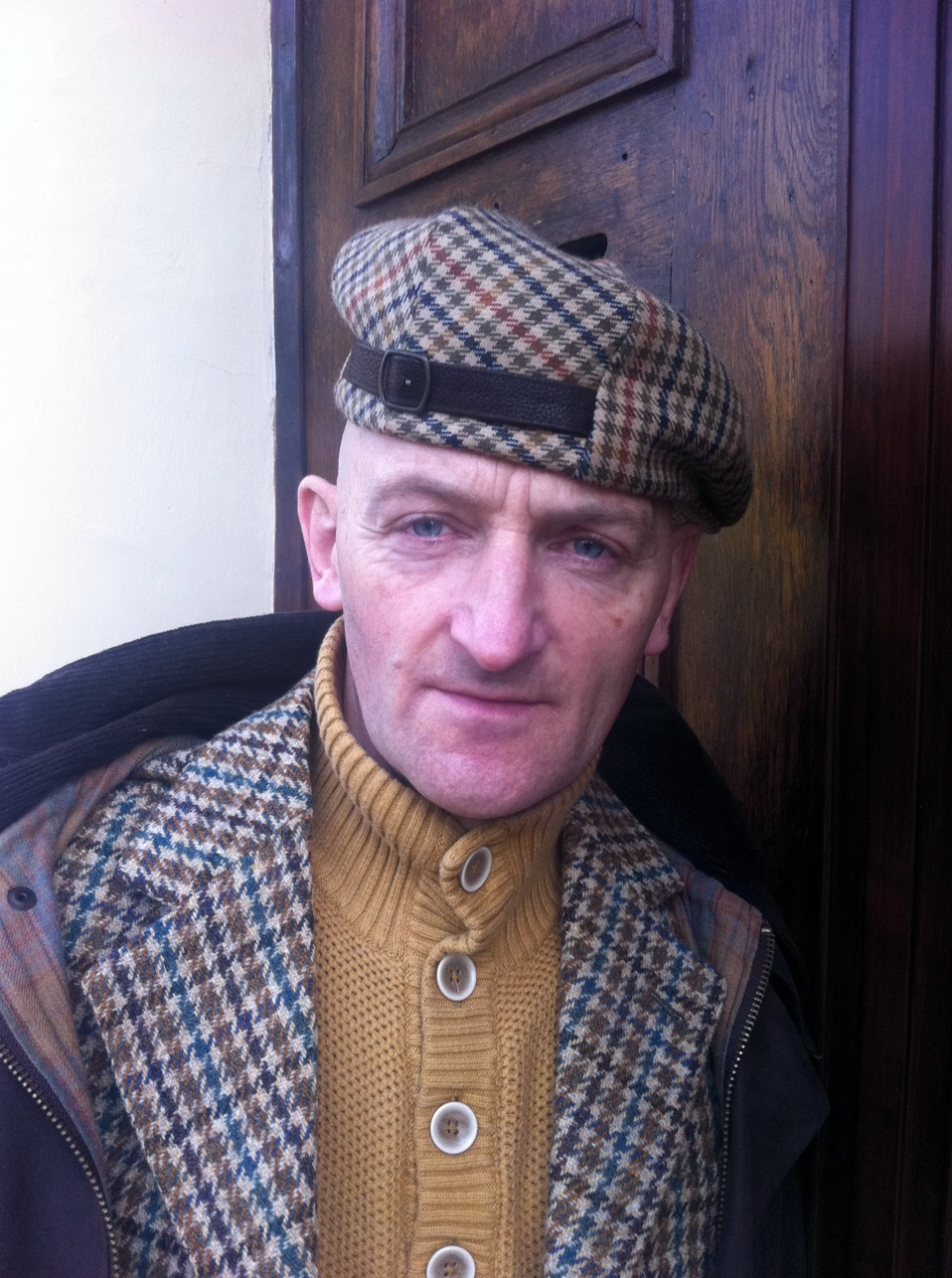
- Bleisch in 2013
- Born: 10 June 1957 (age 69); Schwerin, East Germany (now Germany)
- Occupations: Writer, film director

Sebastian Bleisch (born 10 June 1957), real name Norbert Bleisch, is a German writer and film director of gay pornographic movies which feature in part underage actors.

== Life ==
Born in Schwerin in the former East Germany, Norbert Bleisch was the second child of the Bleisch family. His father was a local official and his mother was a homemaker. Bleisch was raised Catholic by his mother, attending religious school twice a week for ten years as well as Sunday mass. He spent his childhood mostly in his own company, and when he came into puberty at an early age he knew nothing about sexual matters. He secretly enjoyed watching his friends when they went skinny-dipping; however, the shy boy did not participate. At 19 he often participated in competitive cycling, and at that time he had a heavy crush on a 14-year-old boy who was among his fellow cyclists.

Bleisch was a skilled plasterwork professional and worked as musician, theatrical stagehand, nurse and lifeguard. He became known in East Germany with his first book, Kontrollverlust. In April 1991 he was awarded the Alfred Döblin Achievement Award for Viertes Deutschland.

In 2004 Bleisch changed his last name to that of his wife and has since been published as Norbert Leithold.

=== Arrest and conviction ===
Bleisch's filming career came to an abrupt halt when he was arrested on 16 September 1996 during the filming of five boys being intimate in a hangar in Ludwigslust. Some of the parents of Bleisch's models had become suspicious about their sons' activities with the director and the police had initiated a criminal investigation. On 20 May 1997 Sebastian Bleisch was sentenced to two-and-a-half years' detention by the regional court in Schwerin for having used adolescents who were still under 16 years old in the 60 or so pornographic films he had directed since 1990. He evaded conviction on more serious charges, however, after the defence showed that the boys had approached Bleisch willingly and no psychological harm had occurred. While Bleisch served his sentence in the Bützow Penal Institution he wrote a trilogy of novels for which a publisher has not yet been found.

== Works ==
=== Books ===
- Kontrollverlust (Loss of Control), Hinstorff Verlag, Rostock 1988, ISBN 3-356-00216-3;
  Paperback: Bertelsmann Vlg., München 1989, ISBN 3-570-09323-9
- Lord Müll (Lord Waste), Hinstorff Verlag, Rostock 1990, ISBN 3-356-00293-7
- Viertes Deutschland (A Fourth Germany), Suhrkamp Verlag, Frankfurt am Main 1992. ISBN 3-518-11719-X
- "Anna". In: Andreas Neumeister, Marcel Hartges (Eds.): Poetry! Slam! Texte der Pop-Fraktion. Rowohlt Verlag, 1996. ISBN 3-499-13736-4

=== Movies ===
- Die Knabenburg ("The Boy Castle")
- Pfadfinderschlacht ("The Battle of the Boy Scouts")
- Das Schloß der geilen Boys ("The Palace of the Horny Boys")
- Der Bücherwurm ("The Book Worm")
- Leiche gesucht ("Missing Corpse")
- Manuel 1,2
- Der Maulheld ("The Big Mouth")
- Der Mörder ist nicht der Gärtner ("The Murderer is not the Gardener")
- Steinzeitbengel ("Stoneage Boys")
- Der Giftzwerg ("The Poison Dwarf")

Bleisch has also directed 9 volumes in the series New Golden Boys.

== Literature ==
- Frank Goyke and Andreas Schmidt: Der Oscar Wilde von Schwerin. Chronik der Pornoaffäre Sebastian Bleisch, Schwarzkopf und Schwarzkopf Verlag, Berlin 1998, ISBN 3-89602-145-1
- Ingo Niermann: Minusvisionen. Unternehmer ohne Geld. Protokolle, Suhrkamp Verlag, Frankfurt am Main 2003. ISBN 3-518-12327-0 (contains discussion minutes with "Norbert B.")
