= Augusta Bender =

German writer (1846-1924)

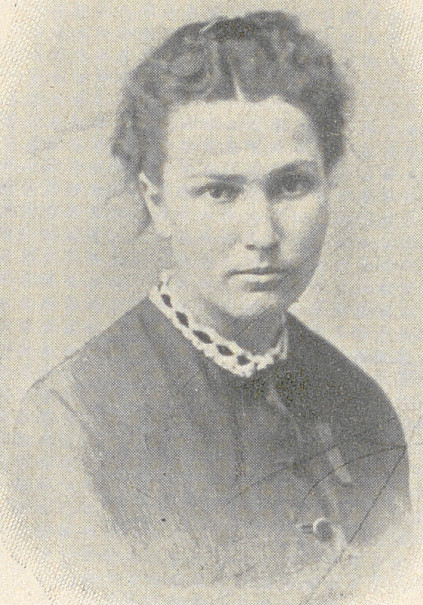
- Born: March 20, 1846; Oberschefflenz
- Died: September 16, 1924 (aged 78); Mosbach
- Occupations: Teacher, poet and writer

Augusta Bender (March 20 1846 – September 16, 1924) was a German teacher, poet, writer, and women's rights activist.

== Early and personal life ==
Bender was born in the small village of Oberschefflenz in south-central Germany to a poor family of farmers. She had five siblings and was the youngest child. Bender showed a keen interest in literature at a very young age and was considered a misfit in school. Her mother supported her passion for education and self-improvement.

Bender later made a decision not to get married and to make a living by her own which was unusual for women at the time. Bender was also a vegetarian and a staunch advocate of animal rights.

== Career and Activities ==
At 16 years of age, Bender left her hometown to further her education. At 17, she first attempted to have her poetry published by submitting it at the local newspaper but got rejected. She then dabbled in acting but quickly realized it was not for her. She lived with a family of educators in Mosbach, not far from her home town, and decided to study education. In 1886 she finished training as a private tutor.

She then moved to Heidelberg and made a living as a teacher and travel companion for foreigners, and soon was able to publish some of her poems. In 1871 she planned to move to the United States but got ill and was therefore unable to follow through. In 1873 she was very active in delivering public lectures around Karlsruhe, Stuttgart, and Mannheim concerning women's rights. She was heavily involved in spreading the feminist movement.

In 1891, Bender obtained a temporary position as an instructor at Smith College in Northampton, Massachusetts. She eventually moved back to Germany to retire and devoted a majority of her time to writing.

Bender conducted noteworthy research on German folk songs. Throughout her life she had written nursery rhymes, proverbs, poems and novels.

== Death ==
Bender died on September 16, 1924, at a retirement home in Mosbach.

== Works ==
- Rasche Entschlüsse (1868)
- Ein Bild aus der Wirklichkeit (1869–70)
- Ein dunkles Verhängnis (1869–70)
- Deutsche Liebe in Amerika (1882)
- Die Frauenfrage in Deutschland (1883)
- Mein Bruder (1883)
- Haideblumen (1887)
- Die Reiterkäthe: Heimatroman aus dem Dreißigjährigen Krieg (1893)
- A German Girl in America/Ein deutsches Mädchen in Amerika. (1893 in English) (1901 in German)
- Hausfreundin 1, 2 & 3 (1900–1903)
- Sorle, die Lumpenfrau (1901)
- Oberschefflenzer Volkslieder (1902)
- Das Spinnrad (1902)
- Der Kampf ums höhere Dasein (1907)
- Kulturbilder (1910)
- Die Macht des Mitleids (1905)
- Auf der Schattenseite des Lebens (1913–14)
