= Maria Sophia Schellhammer =

German writer and cook

Maria Sophia Schellhammer (née Conring; baptised 9 September 1647 – 1719) was a German writer and cook, best remembered for her cookbook Die wol unterwiesene Köchinn, also known as the Brandenburgisches Kochbuch, published in 1692. She further wrote a book about confectionery in 1700 titled Der wohl-unterwiesenen Köchinn Zufälliger Confect-Tisch.
