= Renata Thiele =

Polish-German author

Renata Anna Thiele (born in Zielona Góra) is a German writer.

She was above all known for her soft thriller about the Aachen Pilgrimage and the Salvator relics in Kornelimünster and her favorite student in freshman institute, Khang.

== Life ==
Thiele studied German studies in her hometown of Zielona Góra in Poland and from 1988 in research studies in German studies and Comparative literature at RWTH Aachen. Today she works in her adopted place of residence Aachen as a tour guide, translator and language teacher.

Between 1980 and 1987 she was in the student organization of the UN Friends (SSP ONZ) worked as a co-organizer of scientific seminars on economic, political and social issues - two years as secretary of the Audit Board of the organization and two years as a board member.

In 1988 she was appointed by the District Court in Zielona Góra for sworn translator, which corresponds to a certified translator.

She writes detective novels, short stories, travelogues and articles for magazines and internet portals in German and Polish.

Many of her articles have appeared in the Euregional cultural magazine Polregio that has been available in the region around Aachen in Belgium, Germany and the Netherlands and in which she worked as chief editor between 2005 and 2010.

== Works ==
- Berlin, Waldweg. Kriminalkurzgeschichte in Wedding Connections. Karo Krimi, Berlin 2004, ISBN 3-937-881-02-6 (Selected Mysteries)
- Des Kobolds Glück. Kurzgeschichte in Firio Maonara. (Subtitle „von den Kochfeuern der Elben“). INTRAG Publishing, Los Angeles, USA 2005, ISBN 1-933-14012-7 (Recipe book for salads and dressings and fantastic short stories)
- Eine heilige Sache. Große Sünden – kleine Sünden. Soft thriller. Textera, Aachen 2014, ISBN 978-3-00-045853-8
- Die verschollenen Noten. Kalt berechnet – heiß begehrt. Soft thriller. Ammianus, Aachen 2016, ISBN 978-3945025390
- "Serca w Winnicy - Herzen im Weinberg." a short story within the anthology "Mittelmosel Bittersüß. Eine literarische Auslese von Trier bis Traben-Trarbach" Ammianus, Aachen 2016, ISBN 978-3-945025-40-6
- Das Vermächtnis. Alte Liebe - frische Spur. Ammianus, Aachen 2017, ISBN 978-3-945025-68-0
- Burtscheider Halbwahrheiten - Erforschte und erfundene Geschichten aus über eintausend Jahren. Eifeler Literaturverlag, Aachen 2020, ISBN 978-3-96123-004-4
- Zwischen Wein und Liebe – Solange die Mosel fließt. Rhein-Mosel-Verlag, Zell-Mosel 2024, ISBN 978-3-89801-474-8
