= Heike Geißler =

German author (born 1977)

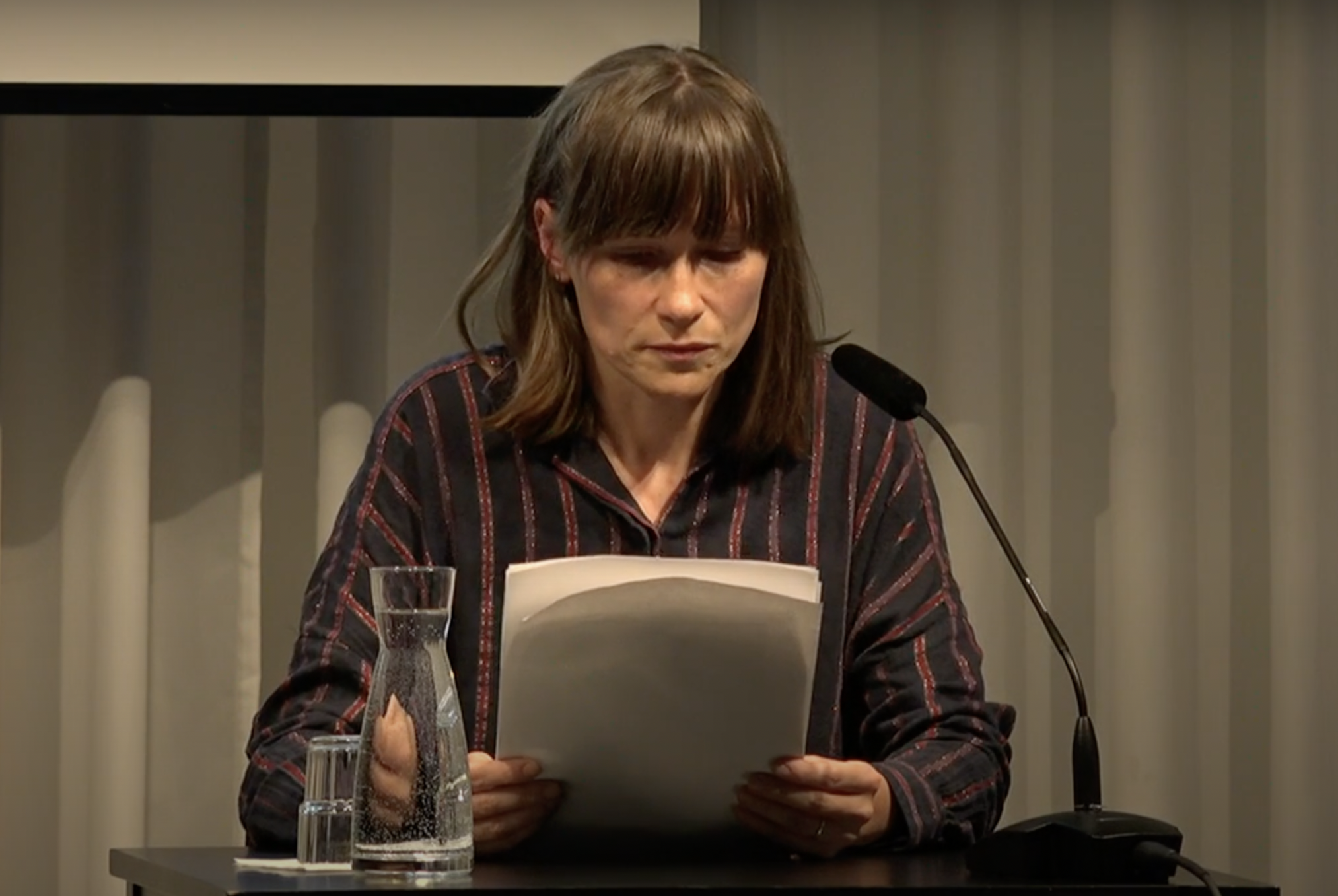
- Heike Geißler, 2018
- Born: 5 April 1977 (age 49); Riesa, East Germany
- Occupation: Author

Heike Geißler (born 5 April 1977) is a German author. She is a recipient of the Alfred Döblin Prize and the Heinrich-Böll-Preis.

== Life ==
Heike Geißler was born in Riesa, Bezirk Dresden, East Germany, on 5 April 1977. She grew up in Riesa and Karl-Marx-Stadt/Chemnitz. In 2001, she received the "Förderpreis" (sponsorship award) of the Alfred Döblin Prize for her novel Rosa, which was published the following year. Her novel Saisonarbeit (2014) was published as Seasonal Associate by Semiotext(e) in English translation by Katy Derbyshire in 2018 to critical acclaim.

She lives in Leipzig.

== Awards (selection) ==
- 2001: Alfred Döblin Prize (Förderpreis)
- 2025: Klopstock-Preis "for her overall literary achievement"
- 2025: Heinrich-Böll-Preis
- 2025: Bayerischer Buchpreis (de), non-fiction category, for her essay Verzweiflungen

== Publications (selection) ==
- Rosa. Roman. Deutsche Verlags-Anstalt, Stuttgart/München 2002, ISBN 3-421-05605-6.
- Nichts, was tragisch wäre. Deutsche Verlags-Anstalt, München 2007, ISBN 978-3-421-04219-4.
- Emma und Pferd Beere. With illustrations by Simone Waßermann, Lubok Verlag, Leipzig 2009, ISBN 978-3-941601-09-3.
- Saisonarbeit. Spector Books, Leipzig 2014, ISBN 978-3-944669-66-3.
  - English-language translation: Seasonal Associate. Translated Katy Derbyshire. Semiotext(e), New York 2018, ISBN 978-1-63590-036-1.
- Die Woche. Roman (in German). Berlin: Suhrkamp Verlag. 2022. ISBN 978-3-518-43053-8. OCLC 1277291138.
- Verzweiflungen. Essay. Suhrkamp, Berlin 2025, ISBN 978-3-518-12873-2.
- Arbeiten. Essay. Hanser, Berlin / München 2025, ISBN 978-3-446-27977-3.
- Michaela Kohlhaas. novel, Suhrkamp, Berlin 2026, ISBN 978-3-518-43280-8.
