= Vera Botterbusch =

German journalist, author and photographer

Vera Botterbusch (born February 10, 1942) is a German journalist, author, photographer and film producer.

== Biography ==
Vera Botterbusch was born in Dortmund and was educated in Romance studies, German studies, elocution and art in Bonn, Münster and Grenoble. She was also the scholarship holder of the Evangelical Study Foundation Villigst at the time. Botterbusch was known for her films on literature, art and music broadcast on Bavarian television and also for her publicity work for Süddeutsche Zeitung through her theater work and exhibitions. She also published poetry and short stories.

Botterbusch is a member of the Bundesverband Bildender Künstler (BBK), the VBK (Association of Visual Artists), the VS (Association of German Writers (ver.di)) and the PEN.

Botterbusch married Klaus Konjetzky in 1976.

== Selected filmography ==
- Strukturen. Gewebte Bilder, Textile Objekte (1978)
- Die Hebriden. Annäherungen an eine Musik von Felix Mendelssohn-Bartholdy (1980)
- Die Jagd nach dem Glück. Hommage à Stendhal (1982)
- Das Kalifornien der Poesie. Hans Christian Andersen in Schweden (1984)
- Musik einer Landschaft. Der Komponist Jean Sibelius (1986)
- Mit dem Esel durch die Cevennen. Eine Reise von Robert Louis Stevenson (1988)
- Jede Straße führt in die Kindheit. Der Schriftsteller Horst Bienek (1989)
- Verloren daheim. Ernst Barlach. Künstler in dunkler Zeit (1994)

== Literature ==
Poetry in both magazines and anthologies

- Aber besoffen bin ich von dir, Liebesgedichte, Hg. Jan Hans, Rowohlt Taschenbuch Verlag, Hamburg 1979
- Seit du weg bist, Liebesgedichte danach, Hg. Jan Hans, Rowohlt Taschenbuch Verlag, Hamburg 1982
- Straßengedichte Hg. Joachim Fuhrmann, Wilhelm Heyne Verlag, München, 1982
- Alles wandelt sich – Echos auf Ovid, Hg. Gabrielle Alioth u. Hans-Christian Oeser, P&L Edition, München, 2016
