= Anne Duden =

German writer

Anne Duden (born 1942) is a German writer who moved with her family to West Germany in 1954. Her poetry and prose cover experiences involving violence, pain and despair. A member of the German Academy for Language and Literature, she has been a guest professor at the University of Hamburg and has lectured on poetry in Paderborn and Zürich. Her many awards include the Heinrich-Böll-Preis in 2003.

== Biography ==
Borb on 1 January 1942, Anna Duden was raised in Berlin and then in Ilsenburg. In 1953, she escaped to West Germany with her mother and two siblings. She graduated from high school in Oldenburg and went off to study German at the Free University of Berlin.

== Career ==
In 1972, Duden was employed by the Verlag Klaus Wagenbach publishing house in Berlin. The following year, together with some of her colleagues, she founded the Rotbuch Verlag where she worked for a number of years. From 1978, she was a freelance writer in London and Berlin. In addition to her poetry books, she published articles and essays in journals and anthologies.

Duden has been a guest professor for literature at the University of Hamburg (1989) and has lectured on poetry at the University of Paderborn (1995) and the University of Zurich (1996).

Her reputation as an innovative writer began with the publication of her collection of stories Übergang (1985) and was followed in 1985 by her novel Das Jadasschaf depicting the anguish aroused by recent German history. She extends her visions of horror and laments in the poetry of Steinschlag (1993) and Hingegend (1999).

Anne Duden is a member of the Deutsche Akademie für Sprache und Dichtung (German Academy for Language and Literature) and a corresponding member of the Akademie der Wissenschaften und der Literatur (Academy of Sciences and Literature) in Mainz.
