= Hilde Domin =

German poet and writer (1909–2006)

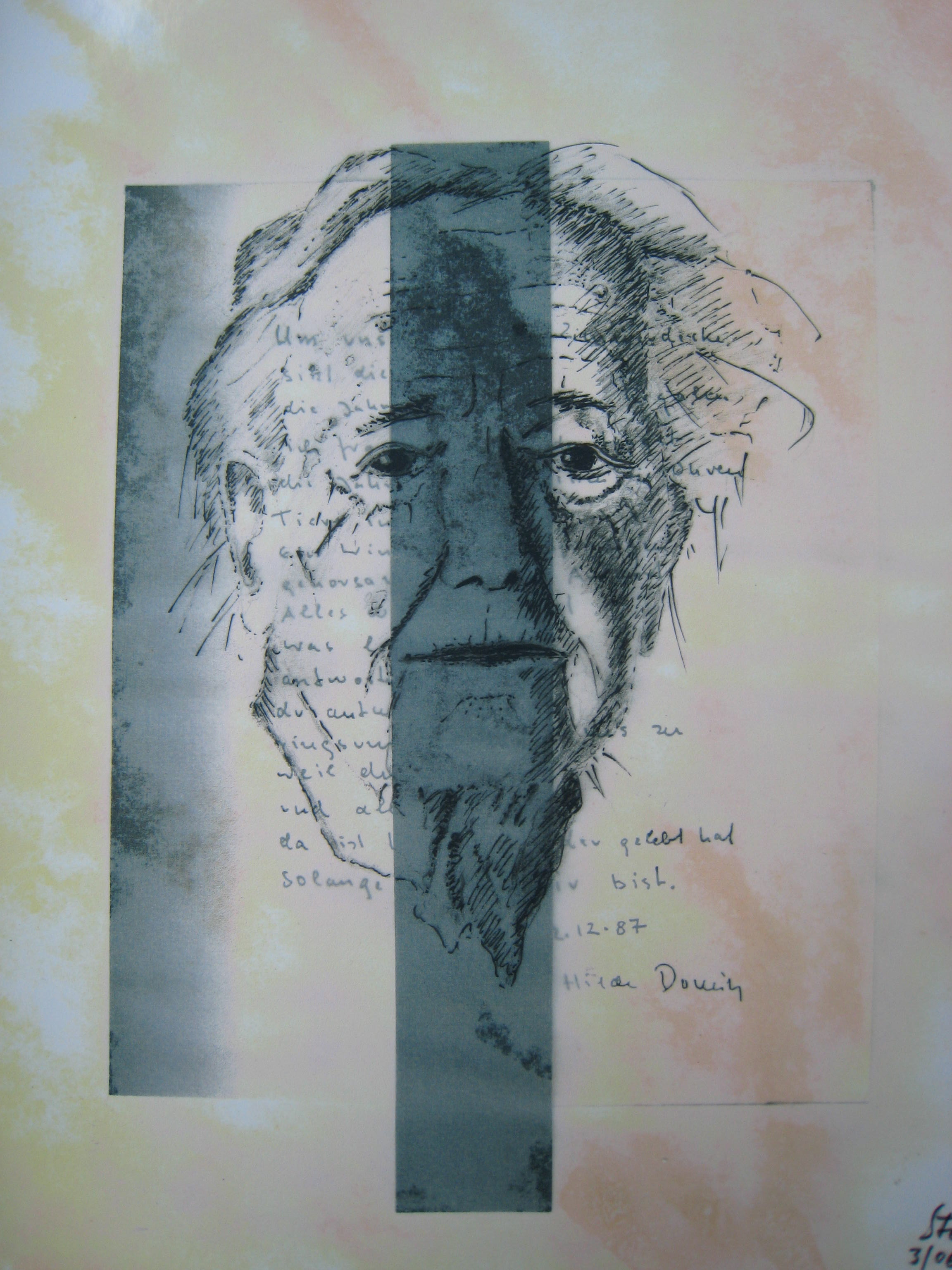
- Born: Hilde Löwenstein; 27 July 1909; Cologne, German Empire
- Died: 22 February 2006 (aged 96); Heidelberg, Germany
- Other name: Hilde Palm
- Occupation: poet
- Spouse: Erwin Walter Palm (m. 1936; died 1988)

Hilde Domin (27 July 1909 – 22 February 2006) is the pseudonym of Hilde Palm (née Löwenstein), a German lyric poet and writer. She was among the most important German-language poets of her time.

== Biography ==
Domin was born in 1909 in Cologne as Hildegard Löwenstein, the daughter of Eugen Löwenstein (d. 1942), a German Jewish lawyer, and Paula (d. 1943). Domin's year of birth has been erroneously reported as 1912.

Between 1929 and 1932 she studied at Heidelberg University, Cologne University, University of Bonn, and the Humboldt University of Berlin. She initially studied law, and later specialized in economics, social sciences and philosophy. Among her teachers were Karl Jaspers and Karl Mannheim.

As a result of the increasingly virulent anti-semitism in Nazi Germany, she emigrated to Italy in 1932 with her friend (and future husband) Erwin Walter Palm who was a writer and student of archaeology. She received a doctorate in political science in Florence in 1935 and worked as a language teacher in Rome from 1935 to 1939. She and Erwin Walter Palm were married in 1936. With Hitler's visit to Rome and the acrimonious atmosphere of fascist Italy under Mussolini the couple was prompted to once again emigrate.

In 1939 the couple went to England where she worked as language teacher at St Aldyn's College. Hilde's fears of the Nazi menace did not wane, and the couple frantically tried to obtain a visa to any American nation. None of their preferred countries (the United States, Mexico, Argentina and Brazil) granted them a visa, while others would have charged them exorbitant sums of money. The only country where they were unconditionally welcomed was the Dominican Republic, where they emigrated in 1940.

In Santo Domingo, where they lived for 12 years, Hilde worked as a translator and lecturer at the University of Santo Domingo, and as a photographer of architecture. Her photographs meticulously documented the Ciudad Colonial (old city) of Santo Domingo, which illustrated Palm's seminal book on the art and architecture of Europe's oldest American city. Their work was referenced by the Dominican government in their successful bid before UNESCO to grant the entire sector of old Santo Domingo World Heritage Site status in 1989. She often worked together with other European exiles, such as Austrian photographer Kurt Schnitzer. In November 2006, Hilde was awarded the Order of Merit of Duarte, Sánchez and Mella in recognition of her efforts to advance Dominican culture.

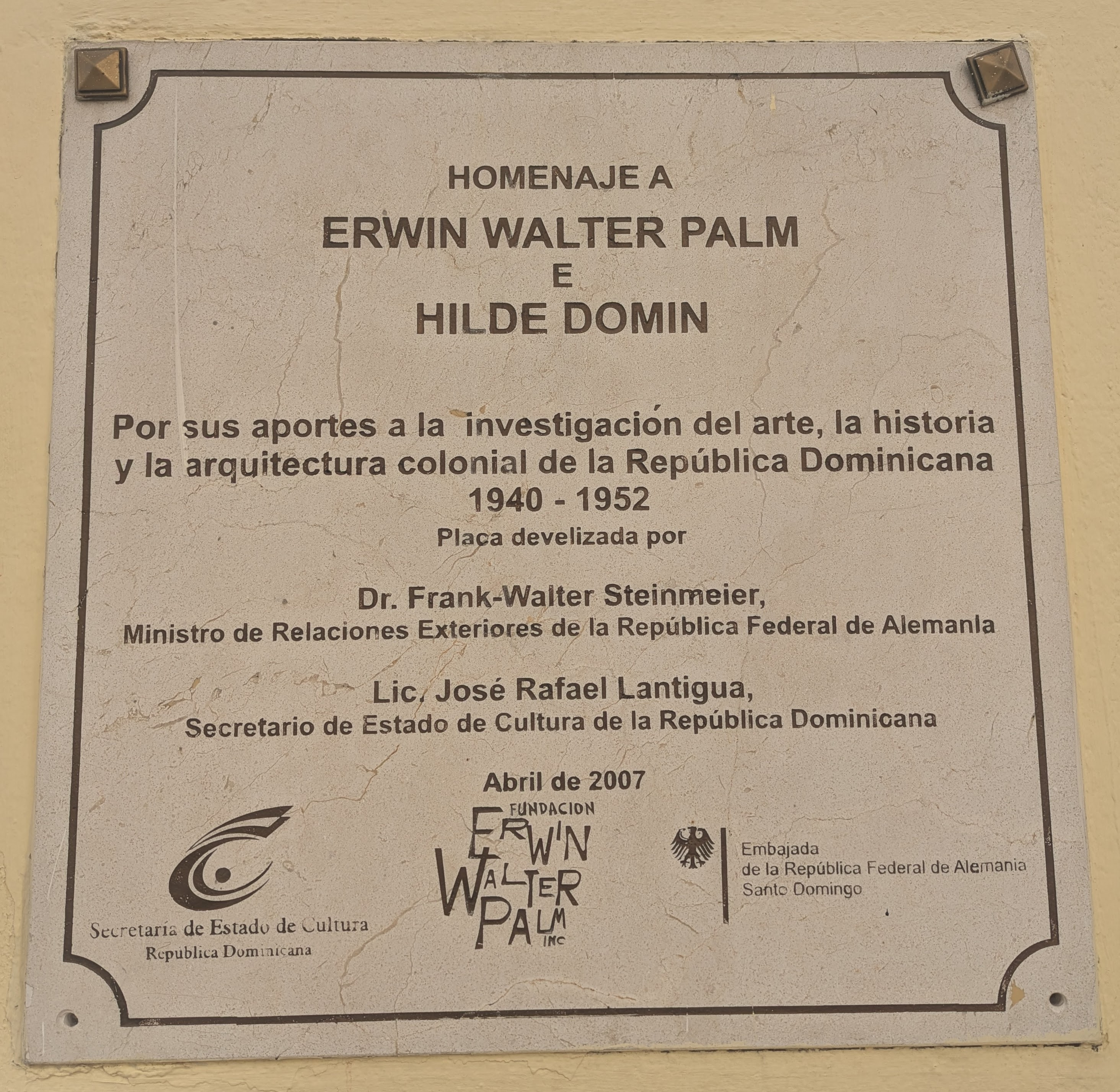
Commemorative Plaque for Erwin Walter Palm and Hilde Domin

Mourning her mother, and a miscarriage, Hilde began to write during her last years in Santo Domingo, choosing a pseudonym, Hilde Domin, that reflected her gratitude to the island which had offered her shelter. Many afternoons were spent by Hilde at the home of Francisco Prats Ramírez, discussing literature and poetry among intellectuals in endless tertulias.

After the end of World War II, in 1954, she and her husband (whose family had been murdered by the Nazis) returned to Germany.

Domin lived as a writer in Heidelberg from 1961 until her death.

She was a close friend of Nelly Sachs, her lyric colleague living in Stockholm, who won the Nobel Prize in Literature in 1966. From 1960 to 1967 they had a correspondence that was almost sisterly in intensity. She was also a friend of Hans-Georg Gadamer.

In 1968, she presented Das zweite Paradies (The Second Paradise), her first volume of prose, and a critical love story dealing with the experience of exile and home.

Her poems are rarely metaphorical, completely unpathetic and of a simple vocabulary that in its simplicity meets magic. Her writings have been recognized as evocative, appealing and easily accessible to a wide range of readers. Her output also included some pieces on literature theory. She was also a translator, bringing selected works by lyric poets including Denise Levertov and Giuseppe Ungaretti to German language readers.

In an interview in 1986 Domin was asked the question how much courage a writer needed:

A writer needs three types of courage. To be himself/herself. The courage not to lie and to misrepresent and skew, to call things by their right names. And thirdly, to believe in the open mindedness and forthrightness of the others.

Erwin Walter Palm, Domin's husband, died in 1988.

The anthology of poetry Der Baum blüht trotzdem (The Tree Blossoms Nevertheless) which was published in 1999, is her personal farewell. In one of her late poems she encourages us not to become tired. We are rather, as she writes,

Not to tire
but to hold out your hand
gently
as if to a bird
to the miracle

Domin continued to read her poems to audiences until 2006.

She died in Heidelberg, a "grande dame" of German verse, aged 96, on February 22, 2006.

Unpublished in English until 2023, there are now two bilingual editions of her work available in America. They are With My Shadow, translated by Sarah Kafatou and The Wandering Radiance, translated by Mark S. Burrows.

== Books ==
- Hilde Domin - Gesammelte Gedichte (Collected poems), Editorial S. Fischer
- Ziehende Landschaft (Poem, 1955)
- Nur eine Rose als Stütze (Poems, 1959). Her first collection of poetry.
- Rückkehr der Schiffe (Poems, 1962)
- Linguistik (Poems, 1963)
- Hier (Poems, 1964)
- Höhlenbilder (Poems, 1968)
- Das zweite Paradies (Prose, 1968)
- Wozu Lyrik heute. Dichtung und Leser in der gesteuerten Gesellschaft (Prose, 1968). In this essay Hilde Domin asks the question: Why lyrics?
- Ich will dich (Poems, 1970)
- Von der Natur nicht vorgesehen (Autobiography, 1974)
- Aber die Hoffnung. Autobiographisches aus und über Deutschland (Autobiography, 1982)
- Unaufhaltsam (Poem, 1962)
- Rufe nicht
- Der Baum blüht trotzdem (Poems, 1999), ISBN 3100153227
- Vielleicht eine Lilie. Water colours by Andreas Felger. Hünfelden: Präsenz Kunst & Buch, (1999)
- Ausgewählte Gedichte (Selected poems), Frankfurt am Main: Fischer Taschenbuch Verlag, (2000)
- Wer es könnte. Watercolors by Andreas Felger. Hünfelden: Präsenz Kunst & Buch, (2000)
- Auf Wolkenbürgschaft. Watercolors by Andreas Felger. Hünfelden: Präsenz Kunst & Buch, (2005)
- The Wandering Radiance: Selected Poems of Hilde Domin, translated by Mark S. Burrow. Green Linden Press, (2023)
- With My Shadow: The Poems of Hilde Domin, A Bilingual Selection, translated by Sarah Kafatou. Paul Dry Books, (2023)

Her work has been translated into more than 21 languages.

== Awards and prizes ==
For her work Hilde Domin has been awarded a wide range of prizes including:

- Bundesverdienstkreuz Erster Klasse and the Großes Bundesverdienstkreuz
- 1974 Roswitha Prize
- 1983 Nelly Sachs Prize
- 1992 Friedrich-Hölderlin-Preis of the city of Bad Homburg
- 1995 Literaturpreis der Konrad-Adenauer-Stiftung
- 1999 Jakob-Wassermann-Literaturpreis
- 1999 State Prize of the Federal state of North Rhine-Westphalia
- 2004 Honorary citizenship (Ehrenbürgerin) City of Heidelberg
- 2005 Order of Merit of Duarte, Sánchez and Mella, which is the highest order of the Dominican Republic.

== Readings and lectures ==
- Guest of Honour at the Villa Massimo, Rome (1985)
- Frankfurter Poetik-Vorlesungen (1987/88)
- May 2005: Reading of selected poems in both German and English, organized by Oxford University German Society.

== See also ==
Erwin Walter Palm
