= Canan Topçu =

Turkish-German writer

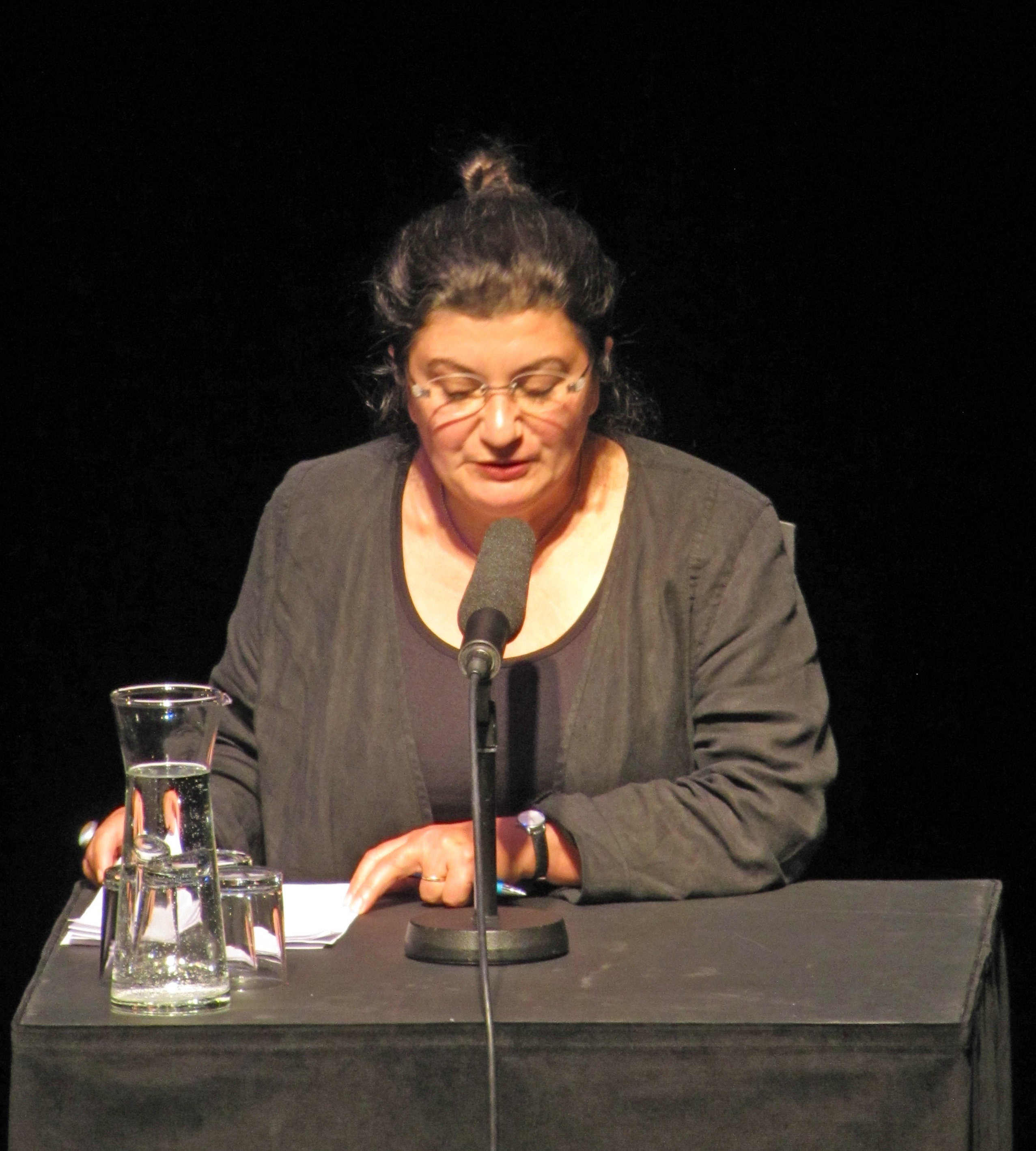
Canan Topçu

Canan Topçu (born 1965, Bursa, Turkey) is a Turkish–German writer.

She arrived in Germany in 1973 and studied literature at Leibniz University Hannover. Her works deal mainly with migration and integration. Since 2003, she has been working as a professor at Hochschule Darmstadt.

== Works ==
- May Ayim, Canan Topçu (Red.): …aus dem Inneren der Sprache. Internat. Kulturwerk, Hildesheim 1995
- Canan Topçu: EinBÜRGERung. Lesebuch über das Deutsch-Werden. Portraits, Interviews, Fakten. 1. Aufl., Brandes & Apsel, Frankfurt am Main 2007
