= Hermine Villinger =

German author

- Born: February 9, 1849; Freiburg im Breisgau
- Died: March 3, 1917 (aged 68); Karlsruhe
- Occupations: Novelist and short-story writer
- Writing career
- Pen name: H. Willfried
- Language: German
- Genre: Dorfgeschichte

Hermine Villinger (February 9, 1849 – March 3, 1917) was a German novelist and short-story writer, who also wrote using the pseudonym H. Willfried. She was known for her stories of village life, in the German literary genre known as Dorfgeschichte.

== Life ==
Hermine Villinger was born on February 9, 1849, in Freiburg. She was a friend of the Austrian writer Marie von Ebner-Eschenbach. She died on March 3, 1917, in Karlsruhe.

== Works ==
- Der lange Hilarius, 1885.
- Sommerfrischen, 1887.
- Schwarzaldgeschichten, 1892.
- Unter Bauern und andere Geschichten. 1894.
- Mutter und Tochter, 1905.
- Die Dachprinzeß, 1908.
