= Hedwig von Beit =

Hedwig Johanna Henriette von Beit (1896–1973) was a self-taught German philologist and folklorist who is remembered for her mammoth work Symbolik des Märchens (Symbolism of Fairy Tales). Published in three volumes in 1952, it was based largely on the contributions of the Swiss Jungian scholar Marie-Louise von Franz although she was not credited for her collaboration. In 2020, the book was republished by the Foundation for Jungian Psychology under the authorship of Marie-Louise von Franz. The English translation by Roy Freeman was titled Archetypal Symbols in Fairytales.

== Biography ==
Born on 17 August 1896 in Frankfurt-am-Main, Hedwig Johanna Henriette Beit was the daughter of the German banker Eduard Beit von Speyer and his wife Lucie Speyer. In 1928, she married the physician Kurt Rüdiger von Roques.

In the mid-1930s, von Beit became interested in interpreting fairy tales and asked the Swiss psychiatrist C.G Jung if he could help. Jung suggested she should contact his colleague Marie-Louise von Franz for assistance. Von Franz devoted herself enthusiastically to the task over the next nine years, researching over 900 tales she received from von Beit. Von Franz was deeply disappointed when she discovered von Beit had published a three-volume work based on her findings without any mention of her collaboration.

Published as Symbolik des Märchens, the work was well received by the scientific community. Most of the tales were drawn from the collections of the Brothers Grimm or from those collected by Friedrich von der Leyen and published as Die Märchen der Weltliteratur. In line with Jung's philosophy, each tale was interpreted symbolically, providing a pictorial view of psychic processes resulting from the interaction of the conscious and subconscious or those stemming directly from the unconscious.

In her later publication Das Märchen. Sein Ort in der geistigen Entwicklung (The Fairytale. Its Place in Spiritual Development, 1965), von Beit dispenses with Jungian interpretations, concentrating on references of European folk tales to the world of the primitive and the world of the child, describing a progression towards a higher level of consciousness. This did not prove nearly as popular as her earlier interpretation of symbolism.

Hedwig von Beit died on 16 October 1973 in Intragna, Switzerland. In 2020, her principal work was republished by the Foundation for Jungian Psychology under the authorship of Marie-Louise von Franz. The English translation by Roy Freeman was titled Archetypal Symbols in Fairytales.
