= Nataly von Eschstruth =

German novelist

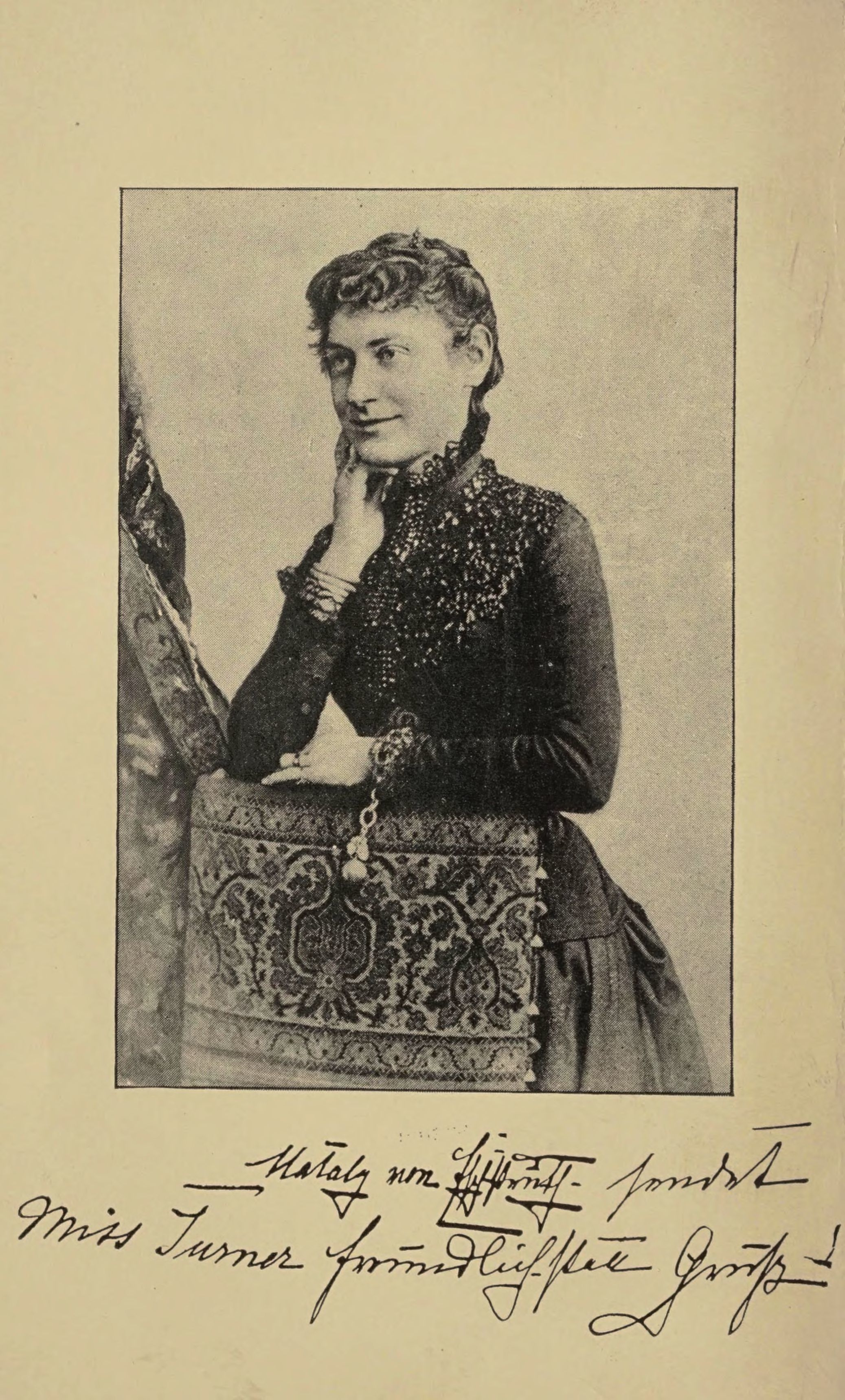
Nataly von Eschstruth (1860–1939)

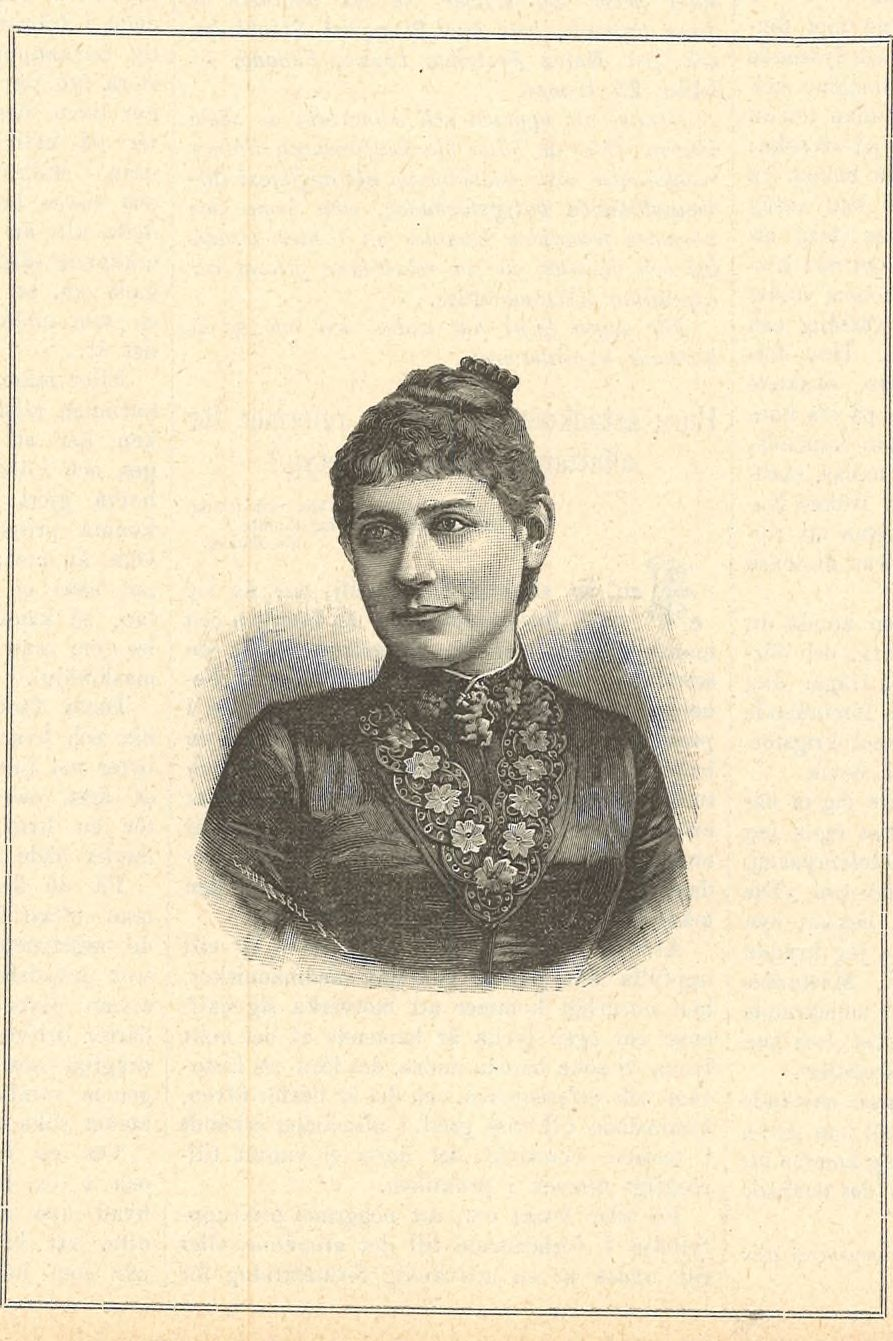
Nataly von Eschstruth. Xylography 1892.

Nataly von Eschstruth (17 May 1860, Hofgeismar, Electorate of Hesse – 1 December 1939, Schwerin) was the pen name of the German novelist Nataly von Knobelsdorff-Brenkenhoff.

== Biography ==
She was daughter of a Hessian officer and was educated in Berlin. In 1880, she married Captain Franz Knobelsdorff-Brenkenhoff, and after some travel lived at Schwerin. She started writing short stories and plays early in her life. Of these plays, Karl Augusts Brautfahrt and Die Sturmnixe, found their way to the stage. Her rapidly sketched novels and stories soon gained popularity and some reached several editions.

== Works ==
- Wolfsburg (Jena, 1884)
- Gänseliesel, eine Hofgeschichte (Berlin, 1886; 5th ed. 1891)
- Katz und Maus (Berlin, 1886)
- Pot-pourri (1886)
- Humoresken (1887)
- Polnisch Blut (1887, 2 vols.; 4th ed. 1894)
- Die Erlkönigin (1887)
- Hazard (1888, 2 vols.)
- Hofluft (1889; 9th ed., 1899)
- Sternschnuppen (1890)
- Im Schellenhemd (1894, 2 vols.)
- Von Gottes Gnaden (1894, 2 vols.)
- Jung gefreit (1897)
- Der Stern des Glucks (1897, 2 vols.)
- Der Majoratsherr (1898, 2 vols.)
- Aus vollem Leben (1900)
- Sonnenfunken (1901)
- Der verlorene Sohn (1902, 2 vols.)
- Die Bären von Hohen-Esp (1902, 2 vols.; 8th ed., 1904)
- Wegekraut (poems; Dresden, 1887)

An illustrated collection of her works was published serially after 1899 in Leipzig.
