= Henri-Joseph Crelier =

Swiss Roman Catholic priest, Hebrew scholar and Biblical exegete

Henri-Joseph Crelier (16 October 1816 – 22 April 1889) was a Swiss Roman Catholic priest, Hebrew scholar and Biblical exegete.

== Life ==
Crelier was born at Bure. From 1845 to 1855 he was professor at the college of Porrentruy (Switzerland); later he became chaplain of the Religious of the Sacred Heart at Besançon, France, and devoted his leisure hours to the study of scripture. He was subsequently appointed pastor of the church of Rebeuvelier, and finally of Bessancourt, France, where he died. Many of his publications attack Ernest Renan's secular interpretations of the Bible.

== Works ==
Among his works are:

- "Les psaumes traduits littéralement sur le texte hébreu avec un commentaire" (Paris, 1858);
- "Le livre de Job vengé des interprétations fausses et impies de M.E. Renan" (Paris, 1860);
- "Le Cantique des cantiques vengé des interprétations fausses et impies de M.E. Renan" (Paris, 1861);
- "M. Renan guerroyant contre le surnaturel" (Paris, 1863);
- "M. E. Renan trahissant le Christ par un roman," etc. (Paris, 1864).

To the "Commentaries on the Bible", published by Lethielleux, he contributed the Acts of the Apostles (1883), Exodus (1886), Leviticus (1886) Genesis (1889).
