= Vellerat =

- Former municipality
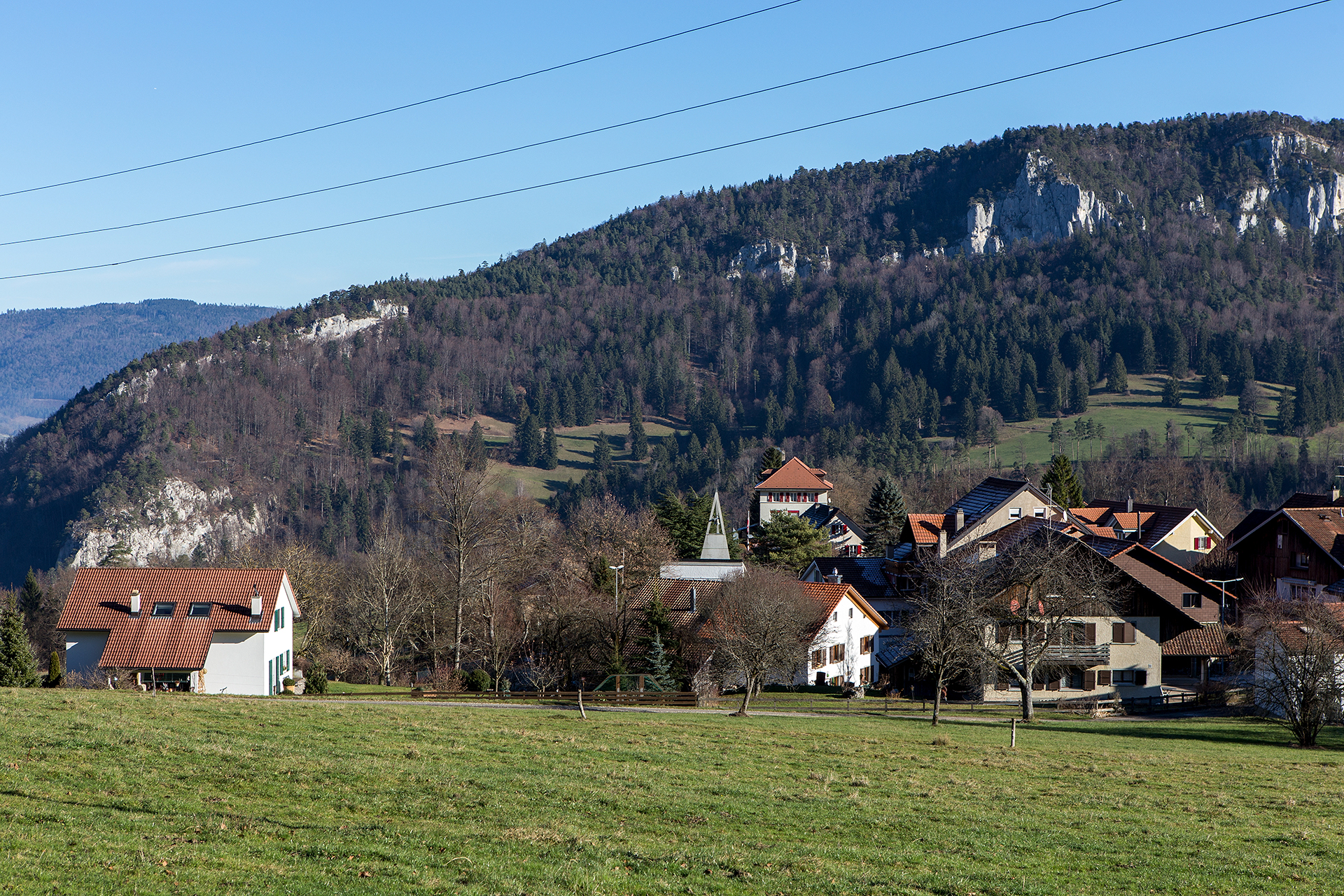
- Vellerat in 2016

- Coat of arms
- Location of Vellerat
- Location within Switzerland Location within Canton of Jura
- Coordinates: 47°19′N 07°22′E
- Country: Switzerland
- Canton: Jura
- District: Delémont

Government
  - Mayor: Maire; Stéphane Rötheli (as of 2008)

Area
  - Total: 2.04 km^{2} (0.79 sq mi)
- Elevation: 666 m (2,185 ft)

Population (2003)
  - Total: 75
  - Density: 37/km^{2} (95/sq mi)
- Time zone: UTC+01:00 (CET)
  - Summer (DST): UTC+02:00 (CEST)
- Postal code: 2830
- SFOS number: 6728
- ISO 3166 code: CH-JU
- Surrounded by: Châtillon, Courrendlin, Roches (BE)
- Twin towns: Voeren/Fourons (Belgium)
- Website: www.vellerat.ch

Vellerat (French pronunciation: [vɛlʁa]) is a former municipality in the district of Delémont in the canton of Jura in Switzerland. On 1 January 2019, the former municipalities of Rebeuvelier and Vellerat merged into the municipality of Courrendlin.

== History ==
Vellerat was first mentioned in 1741 as Vellerat. Vellerat was allowed to leave canton Bern and join canton Jura after a 1996 nationwide referendum (91.6% for, 8.4% against; 31.0% turnout).

== Geography ==
Vellerat has an area of 2.05 km^{2} (0.79 sq mi). Of this area, 0.53 km^{2} (0.20 mi^{2}) or 26.0% is used for agricultural purposes, while 1.44 km^{2} (0.56 mi^{2}) or 70.6% is forested. Of the rest of the land, 0.07 km^{2} (17 acres) or 3.4% is settled (buildings or roads).

Of the built up area, housing and buildings made up 2.5% and transportation infrastructure made up 1.0%. Out of the forested land, 66.7% of the total land area is heavily forested and 3.9% is covered with orchards or small clusters of trees. Of the agricultural land, 3.4% is used for growing crops and 13.7% is pastures and 8.3% is used for alpine pastures.

The municipality is located in the Delemont district.

== Coat of arms ==
The blazon of the municipal coat of arms is Or, a Rooster Gules on Coupeaux Vert.

== Demographics ==
Vellerat has a population (as of December 2020) of 71. As of 2008, 5.8% of the population are resident foreign nationals. Over the last 10 years (2000–2010) the population has changed at a rate of 4.3%. Migration accounted for 10%, while births and deaths accounted for -4.3%.

Most of the population (as of 2000) speaks French (59 or 89.4%) as their first language, German is the second most common (5 or 7.6%) and English is the third (2 or 3.0%).

As of 2008, the population was 52.1% male and 47.9% female. The population was made up of 36 Swiss men (49.3% of the population) and 2 (2.7%) non-Swiss men. There were 32 Swiss women (43.8%) and 3 (4.1%) non-Swiss women. Of the population in the municipality, 26 or about 39.4% were born in Vellerat and lived there in 2000. There were 17 or 25.8% who were born in the same canton, while 12 or 18.2% were born somewhere else in Switzerland, and 9 or 13.6% were born outside of Switzerland.

As of 2000, children and teenagers (0–19 years old) make up 21.2% of the population, while adults (20–64 years old) make up 72.7% and seniors (over 64 years old) make up 6.1%.

As of 2000, there were 32 people who were single and never married in the municipality. There were 28 married individuals, 3 widows or widowers and 3 individuals who are divorced.

As of 2000, there were 27 private households in the municipality, and an average of 2.4 persons per household. There were 8 households that consist of only one person and 3 households with five or more people. In 2000, a total of 26 apartments (54.2% of the total) were permanently occupied, while 16 apartments (33.3%) were seasonally occupied and 6 apartments (12.5%) were empty. The vacancy rate for the municipality, in 2010, was 3.85%.

The historical population is given in the following chart:

== Twin Town ==
Vellerat is twinned with the town of Voeren, Belgium.

== Politics ==
In the 2007 federal election the most popular party was the SPS which received 56.25% of the vote. The next three most popular parties were the CVP (21.88%), the SVP (14.06%) and the FDP (6.25%). In the federal election, a total of 33 votes were cast, and the voter turnout was 58.9%.

== Economy ==
As of 2010, Vellerat had an unemployment rate of 3.5%. As of 2008, there were 4 people employed in the primary economic sector and about 3 businesses involved in this sector. 1 person was employed in the secondary sector and there was 1 business in this sector. 2 people were employed in the tertiary sector, with 1 business in this sector. There were 41 residents of the municipality who were employed in some capacity, of which females made up 34.1% of the workforce.

In 2008 the total number of full-time equivalent jobs was 6. The number of jobs in the primary sector was 3, all of which were in agriculture. The number of jobs in the secondary sector was 1, all of which were in manufacturing. The number of jobs in the tertiary sector was 2. In the tertiary sector; 2 or 100.0% were in the information industry, and .

In 2000, there were 30 workers who commuted away from the municipality. Of the working population, 9.8% used public transportation to get to work, and 73.2% used a private car.

== Religion ==
From the 2000 census, 43 or 65.2% were Roman Catholic, while 8 or 12.1% belonged to the Swiss Reformed Church. Of the rest of the population, there was 1 individual who belongs to another Christian church. 11 (or about 16.67% of the population) belonged to no church, are agnostic or atheist, and 3 individuals (or about 4.55% of the population) did not answer the question.

== Education ==
In Vellerat about 34 or (51.5%) of the population have completed non-mandatory upper secondary education, and 5 or (7.6%) have completed additional higher education (either university or a Fachhochschule). Of the 5 who completed tertiary schooling, 40.0% were Swiss men, 20.0% were Swiss women.

The Canton of Jura school system provides two year of non-obligatory Kindergarten, followed by six years of Primary school. This is followed by three years of obligatory lower Secondary school where the students are separated according to ability and aptitude. Following the lower Secondary students may attend a three or four year optional upper Secondary school followed by some form of Tertiary school or they may enter an apprenticeship.

During the 2009-10 school year, there were no students attending school in Vellerat.

As of 2000, there were 10 students from Vellerat who attended schools outside the municipality.

== Asteroid ==
Asteroid 212374 Vellerat, discovered by amateur astronomer Michel Ory in 2006, was named in honor of the village. The official naming citation was published by the Minor Planet Center on 9 January 2020 (M.P.C. 120069).
