= Grandval railway station =

Railway station in Grandval, Switzerland

Grandval
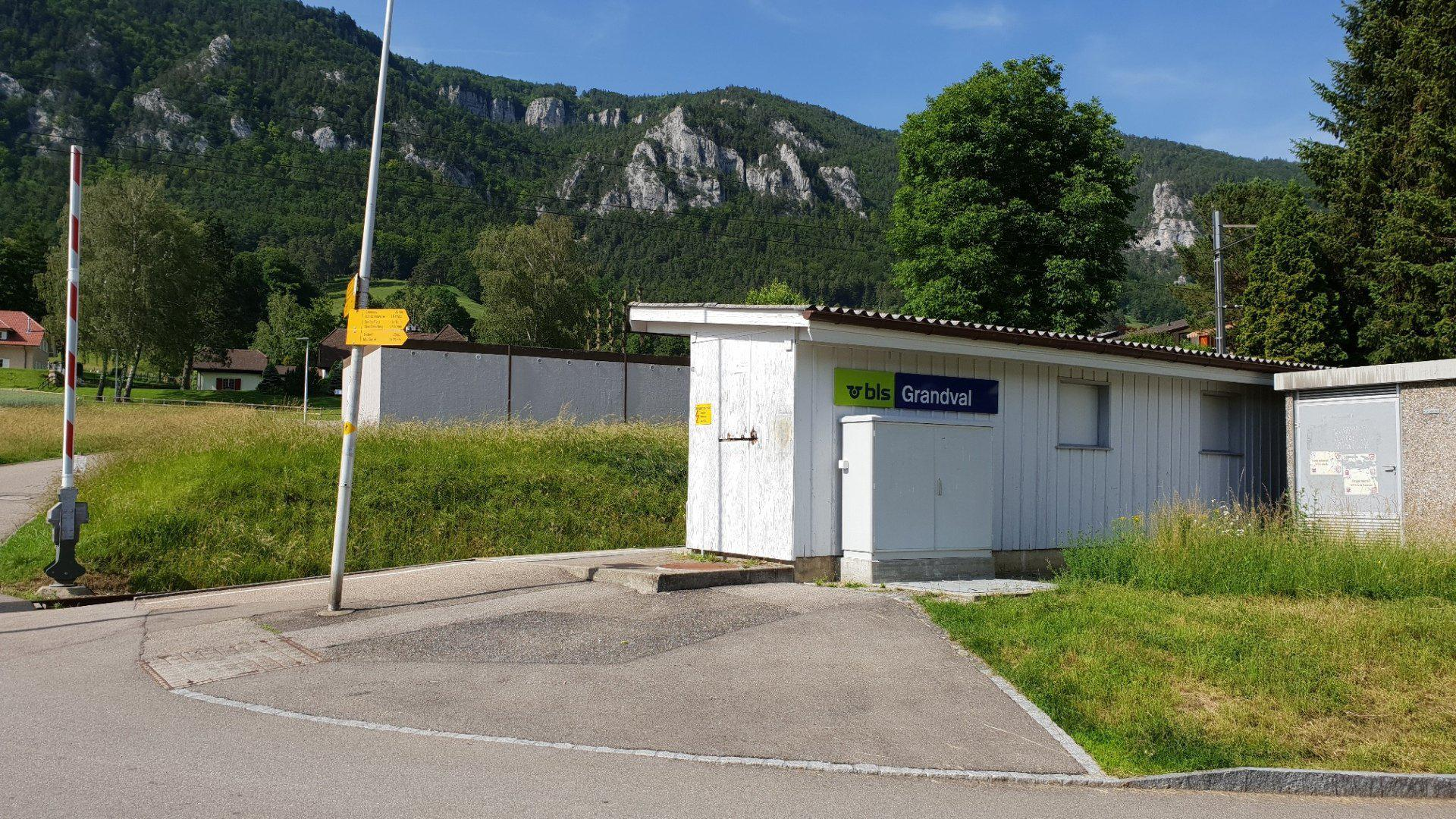
- The station in 2018

General information
- Location: Grandval; Switzerland
- Coordinates: 47°17′02″N 7°25′19″E
- Elevation: 601 m (1,972 ft)
- Owner: BLS AG
- Line: Solothurn–Moutier line
- Distance: 18.8 km (11.7 mi) from Solothurn West
- Platforms: 1
- Tracks: 1
- Train operators: Swiss Federal Railways

Construction
- Accessible: No

Other information
- Station code: 8500268 (GVAL)
- Fare zone: 345 (Libero)

Passengers
- 2023: 50 per weekday (SBB)
Location

Grandval railway station (French: Gare de Grandval) is a railway station in the municipality of Grandval, in the Swiss canton of Bern. It is an intermediate stop on the standard gauge Solothurn–Moutier line of BLS AG and is served by local trains only.

== History ==
Between Spring 2024 and March 2026, the Weissenstein Tunnel is getting a renovation and remains closed. The BLS is using the tunnel closure to renovate the whole of the line. This station will be modernized to permit barrier-free boarding. Replacement buses are running between Gänsbrunnen and Moutier during the construction work.
