= Roches, Switzerland =

Roches
- Municipality
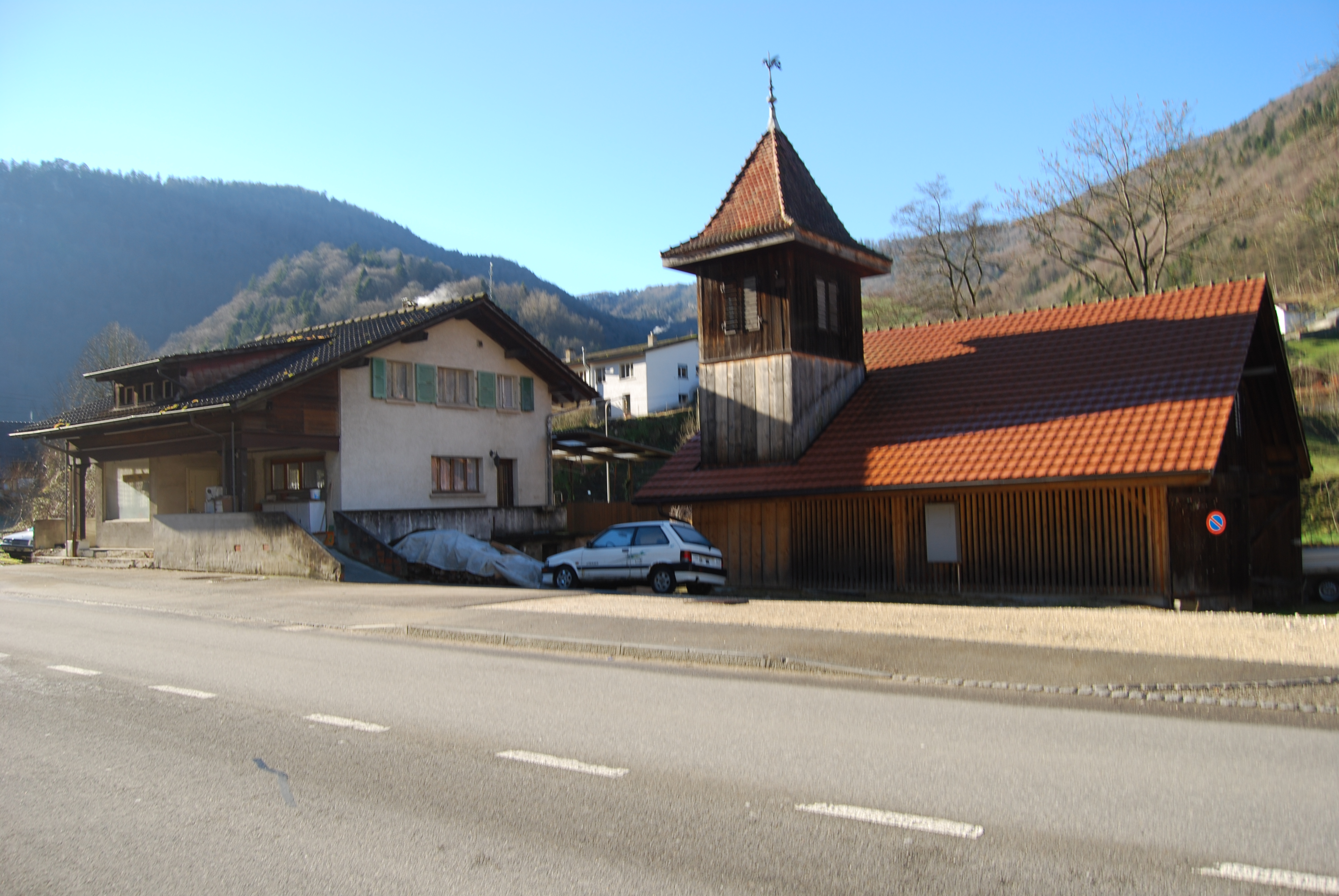
- Roches village

- Flag Coat of arms
- Location of Roches
- Location within Switzerland Location within Canton of Bern
- Coordinates: 47°18′N 7°23′E
- Country: Switzerland
- Canton: Bern
- District: Jura bernois

Government
  - Mayor: Maire; Roger Gerber

Area
  - Total: 8.97 km^{2} (3.46 sq mi)
- Elevation: 491 m (1,611 ft)

Population (Dec 2011)
  - Total: 212
  - Density: 23.6/km^{2} (61.2/sq mi)
- Time zone: UTC+01:00 (CET)
  - Summer (DST): UTC+02:00 (CEST)
- Postal code: 2762
- SFOS number: 704
- ISO 3166 code: CH-BE
- Surrounded by: Moutier (JU), Belprahon, Grandval, Rebeuvelier (JU), Courrendlin (JU), Vellerat (JU), Châtillon (JU)
- Website: https://roches.ch/ SFSO statistics

Roches (French pronunciation: [ʁɔʃ]; Frainc-Comtou: Rœutches) is a municipality in the Jura bernois administrative district in the canton of Bern in Switzerland. It is located in the French-speaking Bernese Jura (Jura Bernois).

== History ==
Roches is first mentioned in 1308 as Roschers.

For most of its history the village was owned by provost of Moutier-Grandval under the Prince-Bishop of Basel. After the 1798 French invasion, Roches became part of the French Département of Mont-Terrible. Three years later, in 1800 it became part of the Département of Haut-Rhin. After Napoleon's defeat and the Congress of Vienna, Roches was assigned to the Canton of Bern in 1815.

In 1791 a glass factory opened was built in the village. In 1817 Célestin Châtelain acquired the factory and operated it until its closure in 1840. Two years later, he opened the Verrerie de Moutier glass factory in nearby Moutier, which grew to become the most important window glass company in Switzerland. Even while the glass factory was in operation, the village remained generally agrarian. In 1876 the Basel-Moutier railroad opened a station in Roches and the village became a local industrial center. However, this industrial growth was short-lived and today only small firms operate in Roches.

== Geography ==
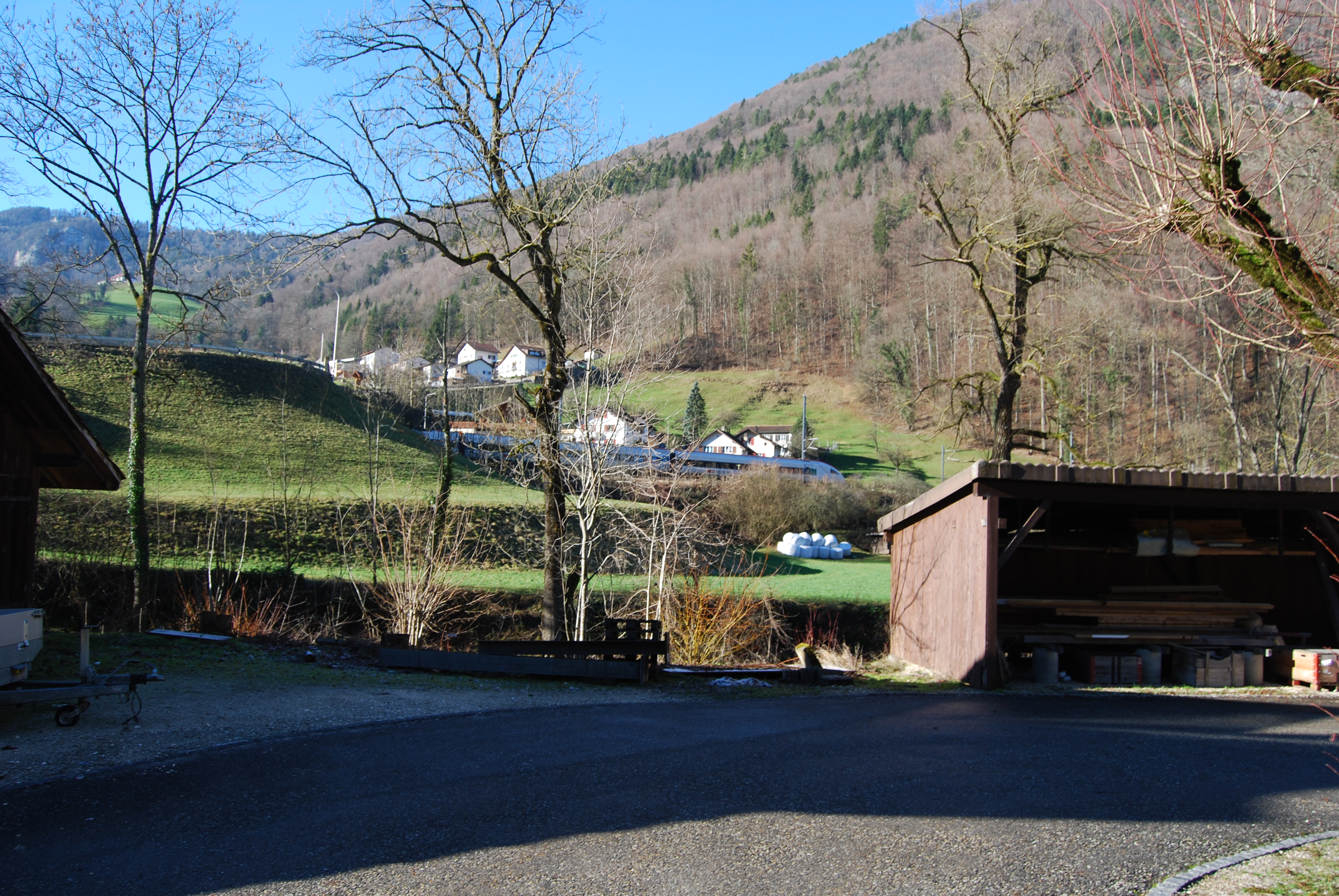
Roches village and surrounding hills

Roches has an area of 9.06 km^{2} (3.50 sq mi). As of 2012, a total of 2.12 km^{2} (0.82 mi^{2}) or 23.4% is used for agricultural purposes, while 6.47 km^{2} (2.50 mi^{2}) or 71.4% is forested. Of the rest of the land, 0.35 km^{2} (0.14 mi^{2}) or 3.9% is settled (buildings or roads), 0.08 km^{2} (20 acres) or 0.9% is either rivers or lakes and 0.03 km^{2} (7.4 acres) or 0.3% is unproductive land.

During the same year, housing and buildings made up 0.9% and transportation infrastructure made up 1.8%. Out of the forested land, 68.5% of the total land area is heavily forested and 2.9% is covered with orchards or small clusters of trees. Of the agricultural land, 10.6% is pastures and 12.6% is used for alpine pastures. All the water in the municipality is flowing water.

The municipality is located along the Birs river in the Moutier Canyon.

On 31 December 2009 District de Moutier, the municipality's former district, was dissolved. On the following day, 1 January 2010, it joined the newly created Arrondissement administratif Jura bernois.

== Coat of arms ==
The blazon of the municipal coat of arms is Per pale Gules and Argent a Monastery Counterchanged.

== Demographics ==
Roches has a population (as of December 2020) of 190. As of 2010, 6.9% of the population are resident foreign nationals. Over the last 10 years (2001-2011) the population has changed at a rate of -2.3%. Migration accounted for -2.3%, while births and deaths accounted for -1.4%.

Most of the population (as of 2000) speaks French (184 or 81.8%) as their first language, German is the second most common (34 or 15.1%) and Italian is the third (3 or 1.3%).

As of 2008, the population was 49.8% male and 50.2% female. The population was made up of 99 Swiss men (45.6% of the population) and 9 (4.1%) non-Swiss men. There were 103 Swiss women (47.5%) and 6 (2.8%) non-Swiss women. Of the population in the municipality, 78 or about 34.7% were born in Roches and lived there in 2000. There were 48 or 21.3% who were born in the same canton, while 67 or 29.8% were born somewhere else in Switzerland, and 22 or 9.8% were born outside of Switzerland.

As of 2011, children and teenagers (0–19 years old) make up 15.6% of the population, while adults (20–64 years old) make up 65.1% and seniors (over 64 years old) make up 19.3%.

As of 2000, there were 96 people who were single and never married in the municipality. There were 98 married individuals, 17 widows or widowers and 14 individuals who are divorced.

As of 2010, there were 20 households that consist of only one person and 9 households with five or more people. In 2000, a total of 90 apartments (76.9% of the total) were permanently occupied, while 18 apartments (15.4%) were seasonally occupied and 9 apartments (7.7%) were empty. In 2011, single family homes made up 47.5% of the total housing in the municipality.

The historical population is given in the following chart:

== Politics ==
In the 2011 federal election the most popular party was the Swiss People's Party (SVP) which received 39.7% of the vote. The next three most popular parties were the Social Democratic Party (SP) (15.4%), another local party (10.5%) and the Christian Democratic People's Party (CVP) (10.4%). In the federal election, a total of 68 votes were cast, and the voter turnout was 39.3%.

== Economy ==
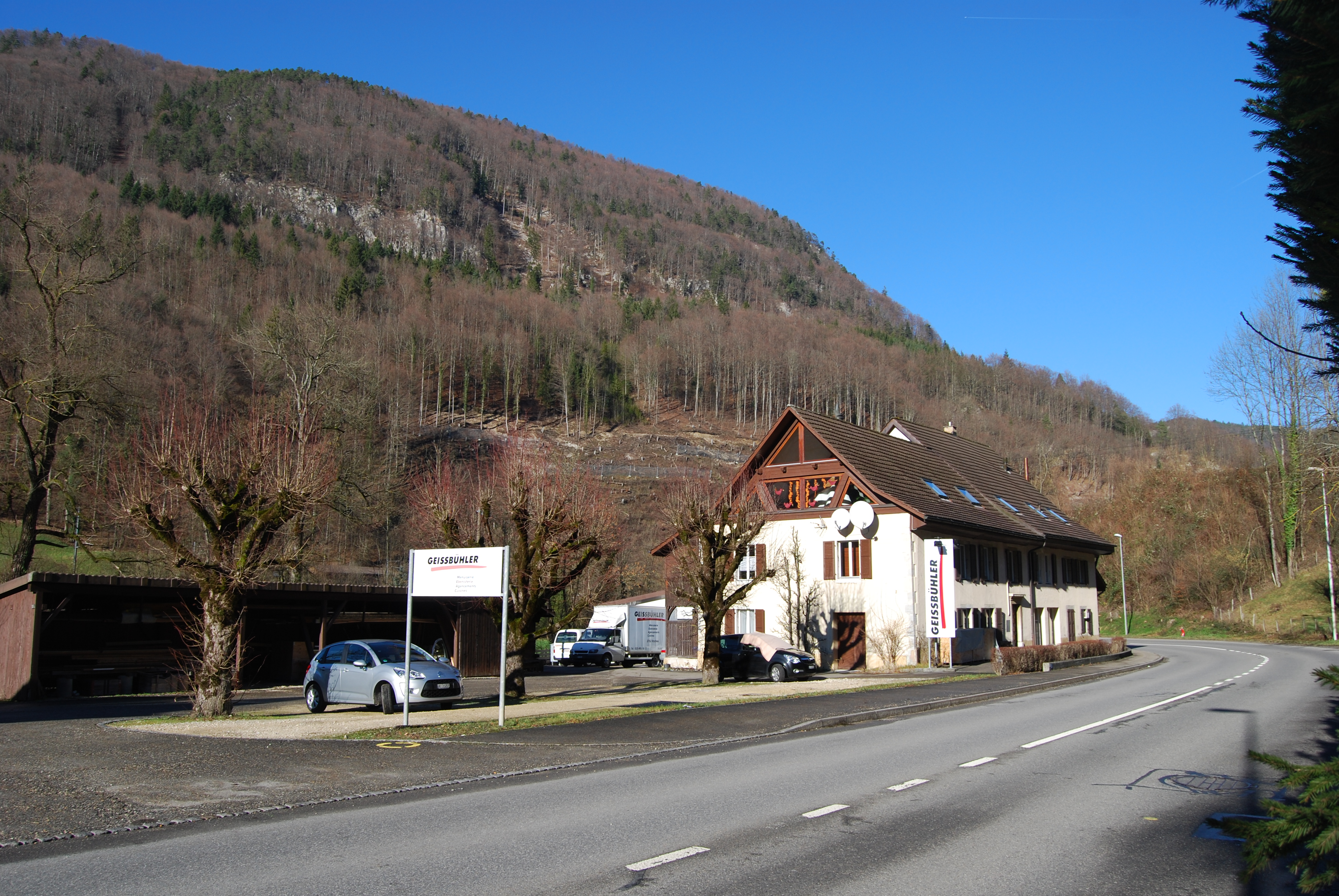
Geissbühler factory, a carpentry company in Roches

As of 2011, Roches had an unemployment rate of 1.29%. As of 2008, there were a total of 45 people employed in the municipality. Of these, there were 20 people employed in the primary economic sector and about 8 businesses involved in this sector. 14 people were employed in the secondary sector and there were 4 businesses in this sector. 11 people were employed in the tertiary sector, with 4 businesses in this sector. There were 122 residents of the municipality who were employed in some capacity, of which females made up 41.0% of the workforce.

In 2008 there were a total of 35 full-time equivalent jobs. The number of jobs in the primary sector was 13, of which 11 were in agriculture and 3 were in forestry or lumber production. The number of jobs in the secondary sector was 13 of which 10 or (76.9%) were in manufacturing and 1 was in construction. The number of jobs in the tertiary sector was 9, of which 8 were in a hotel or restaurant.

In 2000, there were 39 workers who commuted into the municipality and 86 workers who commuted away. The municipality is a net exporter of workers, with about 2.2 workers leaving the municipality for every one entering. A total of 36 workers (50.7% of the 71 total workers in the municipality) both lived and worked in Roches. About 10.3% of the workforce coming into Roches are coming from outside Switzerland. Of the working population, 8.2% used public transportation to get to work, and 69.7% used a private car.

In 2011 the average local and cantonal tax rate on a married resident, with two children, of Roches making 150,000 CHF was 13.2%, while an unmarried resident's rate was 19.4%. For comparison, the rate for the entire canton in the same year, was 14.2% and 22.0%, while the nationwide rate was 12.3% and 21.1% respectively. In 2009 there were a total of 103 tax payers in the municipality. Of that total, 24 made over 75,000 CHF per year. There were 2 people who made between 15,000 and 20,000 per year. The greatest number of workers, 28, made between 50,000 and 75,000 CHF per year. The average income of the over 75,000 CHF group in Roches was 99,979 CHF, while the average across all of Switzerland was 130,478 CHF. In 2011 a total of 3.7% of the population received direct financial assistance from the government.

== Religion ==
From the 2000 census, 95 or 42.2% belonged to the Swiss Reformed Church, while 71 or 31.6% were Roman Catholic. Of the rest of the population, there was 1 individual who belongs to the Christian Catholic Church, and there were 23 individuals (or about 10.22% of the population) who belonged to another Christian church. 12 (or about 5.33% of the population) belonged to no church, are agnostic or atheist, and 23 individuals (or about 10.22% of the population) did not answer the question.

== Education ==
In Roches about 39.2% of the population have completed non-mandatory upper secondary education, and 13.6% have completed additional higher education (either university or a Fachhochschule). Of the 18 who had completed some form of tertiary schooling listed in the census, 55.6% were Swiss men, 22.2% were Swiss women.

The Canton of Bern school system provides one year of non-obligatory Kindergarten, followed by six years of Primary school. This is followed by three years of obligatory lower Secondary school where the students are separated according to ability and aptitude. Following the lower Secondary students may attend additional schooling or they may enter an apprenticeship.

During the 2011-12 school year, there were a total of 11 students attending classes in Roches. There were no kindergarten classes in the municipality. The municipality had one primary class and 11 students.

As of 2000, there were a total of 16 students attending any school in the municipality. All 16 both lived and attended school in the municipality, while 25 students from Roches attended schools outside the municipality.
