= Rossemaison =

- Municipality
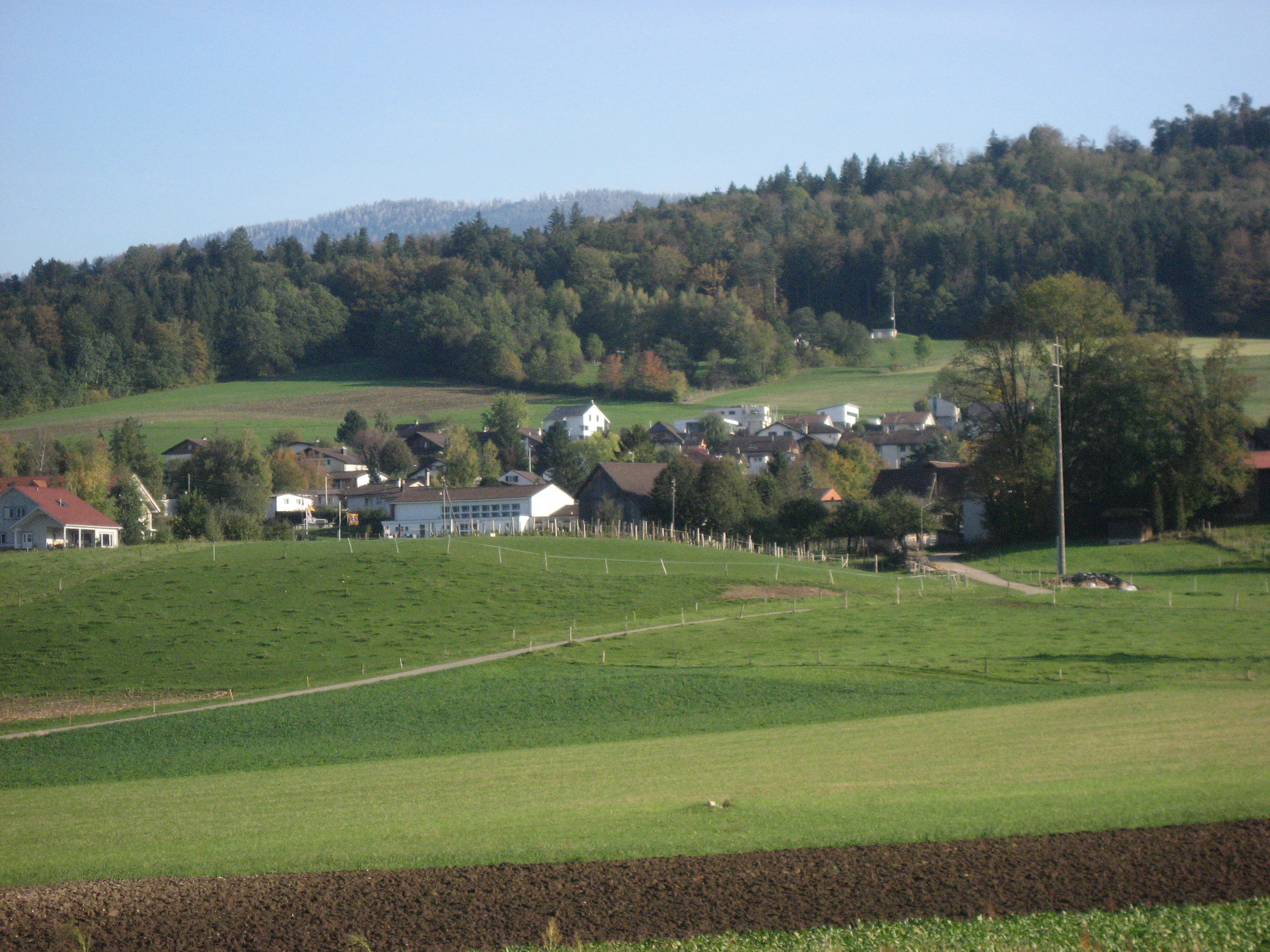
- Rossemaison village

- Coat of arms
- Location of Rossemaison
- Location within Switzerland Location within Canton of Jura
- Coordinates: 47°21′N 07°21′E
- Country: Switzerland
- Canton: Jura
- District: Delémont

Government
  - Executive: Conseil communal with 5 members
  - Mayor: Maire; Yann Rufer (as of 2026)

Area
  - Total: 1.89 km^{2} (0.73 sq mi)
- Elevation: 455 m (1,493 ft)

Population (2020)
  - Total: 687
  - Density: 363/km^{2} (941/sq mi)
- Time zone: UTC+01:00 (CET)
  - Summer (DST): UTC+02:00 (CEST)
- Postal code: 2842
- SFOS number: 6721
- ISO 3166 code: CH-JU
- Surrounded by: Courtételle, Delémont, Courrendlin, Châtillon
- Website: https://www.rossemaison.ch/

Rossemaison (French pronunciation: [ʁɔsmɛzɔ̃]; Frainc-Comtou: Rôsemâjon) is a municipality in the district of Delémont of the canton of Jura in Switzerland.

== History ==
Rossemaison is first mentioned in 1462 as Rosemason. The municipality was formerly known by its German name Rottmund, however, that name is no longer used.

== Geography ==
Rossemaison has an area of 1.89 km^{2} (0.73 sq mi). Of this area, 1.28 km^{2} (0.49 mi^{2}) or 67.7% is used for agricultural purposes, while 0.35 km^{2} (0.14 mi^{2}) or 18.5% is forested. Of the rest of the land, 0.31 km^{2} (0.12 mi^{2}) or 16.4% is settled (buildings or roads).

Of the built up area, housing and buildings made up 13.2% and transportation infrastructure make up 1.1%. Power and water infrastructure as well as other special developed areas make up 1.6% of the area Out of the forested land, 17.5% of the total land area is heavily forested and 1.1% is covered with orchards or small clusters of trees. Of the agricultural land, 46.6% is used for growing crops and 19.6% is pastures, while 1.6% is used for orchards or vine crops.

The municipality is located in the Delémont district.

== Coat of arms ==
The blazon of the municipal coat of arms is Argent, on Coupeaux Vert a Horse rearing Gules.

== Demographics ==
Rossemaison has a population (as of December 2020) of 687. As of 2008, 6.2% of the population are resident foreign nationals. Over the last 10 years (2000–2010) the population has changed at a rate of 8.9%. Migration accounted for 3.7%, while births and deaths accounted for 4.1%.

Most of the population (as of 2000) speaks French (468 or 93.4%) as their first language, German is the second most common (20 or 4.0%) and Italian is the third (11 or 2.2%).

As of 2008, the population was 52.1% male and 47.9% female. The population was made up of 275 Swiss men (49.1% of the population) and 17 (3.0%) non-Swiss men. There were 254 Swiss women (45.4%) and 14 (2.5%) non-Swiss women. Of the population in the municipality, 170 or about 33.9% were born in Rossemaison and lived there in 2000. There were 188 or 37.5% who were born in the same canton, while 79 or 15.8% were born somewhere else in Switzerland, and 52 or 10.4% were born outside of Switzerland.

As of 2000, children and teenagers (0–19 years old) make up 25.7% of the population, while adults (20–64 years old) make up 61.3% and seniors (over 64 years old) make up 13%.

As of 2000, there were 204 people who were single and never married in the municipality. There were 255 married individuals, 27 widows or widowers and 15 individuals who are divorced.

As of 2000, there were 180 private households in the municipality, and an average of 2.8 persons per household. There were 27 households that consist of only one person and 21 households with five or more people. In 2000, a total of 176 apartments (91.2% of the total) were permanently occupied, while 12 apartments (6.2%) were seasonally occupied and 5 apartments (2.6%) were empty. The vacancy rate for the municipality, in 2010, was 0.84%.

The historical population is given in the following chart:

== Politics ==
In the 2007 federal election the most popular party was the SPS which received 43.07% of the vote. The next three most popular parties were the SVP (21.16%), the FDP (18.39%) and the CVP (11.34%). In the federal election, a total of 202 votes were cast, and the voter turnout was 47.9%.

== Economy ==
As of 2010, Rossemaison had an unemployment rate of 3.2%. As of 2008, there were 23 people employed in the primary economic sector and about 8 businesses involved in this sector. 52 people were employed in the secondary sector and there were 6 businesses in this sector. 58 people were employed in the tertiary sector, with 15 businesses in this sector. There were 252 residents of the municipality who were employed in some capacity, of which females made up 40.9% of the workforce.

In 2008 the total number of full-time equivalent jobs was 116. The number of jobs in the primary sector was 18, all of which were in agriculture. The number of jobs in the secondary sector was 48 of which 14 or (29.2%) were in manufacturing and 34 (70.8%) were in construction. The number of jobs in the tertiary sector was 50. In the tertiary sector; 23 or 46.0% were in wholesale or retail sales or the repair of motor vehicles, 2 or 4.0% were in the movement and storage of goods, 1 was in a hotel or restaurant, 17 or 34.0% were technical professionals or scientists, 4 or 8.0% were in education.

In 2000, there were 76 workers who commuted into the municipality and 196 workers who commuted away. The municipality is a net exporter of workers, with about 2.6 workers leaving the municipality for every one entering. About 5.3% of the workforce coming into Rossemaison are coming from outside Switzerland. Of the working population, 9.5% used public transportation to get to work, and 70.2% used a private car.

== Religion ==
From the 2000 census, 387 or 77.2% were Roman Catholic, while 65 or 13.0% belonged to the Swiss Reformed Church. Of the rest of the population, there was 1 individual who belongs to the Christian Catholic Church, and there were 18 individuals (or about 3.59% of the population) who belonged to another Christian church. There were 5 (or about 1.00% of the population) who were Islamic. 19 (or about 3.79% of the population) belonged to no church, are agnostic or atheist, and 15 individuals (or about 2.99% of the population) did not answer the question.

== Education ==
In Rossemaison about 202 or (40.3%) of the population have completed non-mandatory upper secondary education, and 57 or (11.4%) have completed additional higher education (either university or a Fachhochschule). Of the 57 who completed tertiary schooling, 64.9% were Swiss men, 33.3% were Swiss women.

The Canton of Jura school system provides two year of non-obligatory Kindergarten, followed by six years of Primary school. This is followed by three years of obligatory lower Secondary school where the students are separated according to ability and aptitude. Following the lower Secondary students may attend a three or four year optional upper Secondary school followed by some form of Tertiary school or they may enter an apprenticeship.

During the 2009-10 school year, there were a total of 55 students attending 4 classes in Rossemaison. There was one kindergarten class with a total of 14 students in the municipality. The municipality had 3 primary classes and 41 students. There are only nine Secondary schools in the canton, so all the students from Rossemaison attend their secondary school in another municipality.

As of 2000, there were 4 students in Rossemaison who came from another municipality, while 44 residents attended schools outside the municipality.
