= 1996 Swiss referendums =

Nine referendums were held in Switzerland during 1996. The first five were held on 10 March on revising article 116 of the Swiss Federal Constitution regarding language, abolishing the cantons' responsibilities for providing army equipment, abolishing the federal requirement to purchase distilling equipment, abolishing federal financing of parking areas at rail stations, and whether municipality of Vellerat (then part of the canton of Bern) should become part of the canton of Jura. All proposals except the one regarding army equipment were approved.

The next two referendums were held on 9 June on a law on governmental and administrative organisation and a counter-proposal to the popular initiative "peasants and consumers–for a nature-oriented farming". The counter-proposal was approved, whilst the new law was rejected. The final two referendums were held on 1 December on a popular initiative "against illegal immigration" and an amendment to the federal law on labour in trade and industry. Both were rejected by voters.

== Results ==
Month	Question	For		Against		Blank/invalid		Total	Registered voters	Turnout	Cantons for		Cantons against	
Month	Question	Votes	%	Votes	%	Blank	Invalid	Total	Registered voters	Turnout	Full	Half	Full	Half
March	Constitutional amendment on languages	1,052,052	76.2	329,153	23.8	41,583	4,494	1,427,282	4,599,427	31.0	20	6	0	0
March	Moving the municipality of Vellerat from the canton of Bern to the canton of Jura	1,250,728	91.6	114,105	8.4	55,758	4,948	1,425,539	4,599,427	31.0	20	6	0	0
March	Abolishing the cantonal responsibility for army equipment	601,613	43.7	775,087	56.3	45,376	4,492	1,426,568	4,599,427	31.0	2	2	18	4
March	Abolishing the federal requirement on spirits	1,090,783	80.8	259,215	19.2	67,318	4,949	1,422,265	4,599,427	30.9	20	6	0	0
March	Abolishing federal financing of rail station car parks	741,219	53.9	632,792	46.1	46,519	4,519	1,425,049	4,599,427	31.0	11	6	9	0
June	Counter-proposal to popular initiative on farming	1,086,534	77.6	313,874	22.4	41,150	4,408	1,445,966	4,602,577	31.4	20	6	0	0
June	Law on government and administrative organisation	544,630	39.4	837,990	60.6	55,124	4,678	1,442,422	4,602,577	31.3				
December	Popular initiative "against illegal immigration"	982,867	46.3	1138,301	53.7	28,657	6,281	2,156,106	4,612,266	46.7	10	2	10	4
December	Amendment to the labour law	697,874	33.0	1,418,961	67.0	32,146	5,952	2,154,933	4,612,266	46.7				
Source: Nohlen & Stöver
