= Courrendlin =

- Municipality
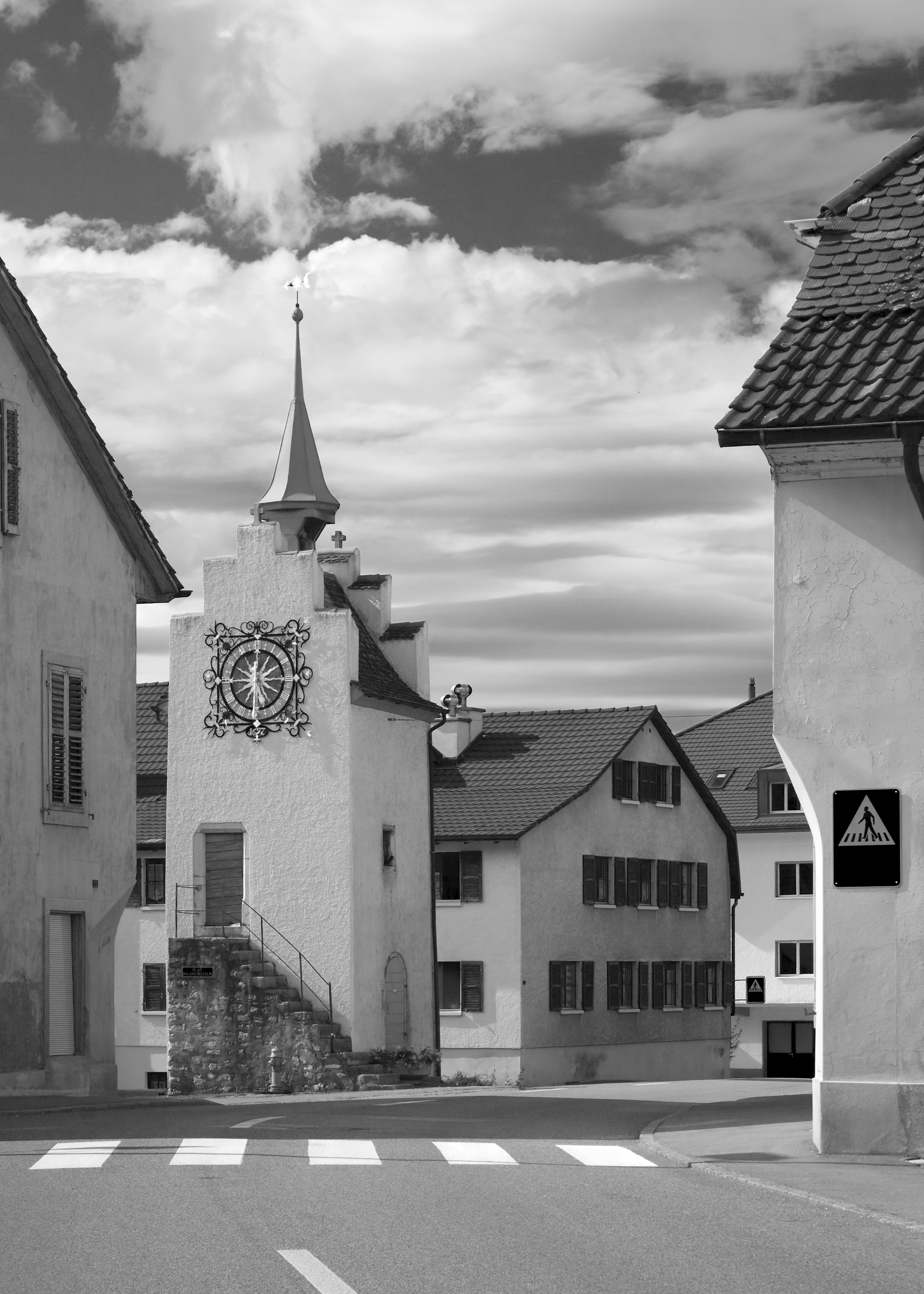
- Courrendlin village

- Coat of arms
- Location of Courrendlin
- Location within Switzerland Location within Canton of Jura
- Coordinates: 47°20′N 07°22′E
- Country: Switzerland
- Canton: Jura
- District: Delémont

Government
  - Executive: Conseil communal with 7 members
  - Mayor: Maire; Joël Burkhalter SPS/PSS (as of 2026)

Area
  - Total: 11.07 km^{2} (4.27 sq mi)
- Elevation: 436 m (1,430 ft)

Population (2003)
  - Total: 2,405
  - Density: 217.3/km^{2} (562.7/sq mi)
- Time zone: UTC+01:00 (CET)
  - Summer (DST): UTC+02:00 (CEST)
- Postal code: 2830
- SFOS number: 6708
- ISO 3166 code: CH-JU
- Localities: Choindez
- Surrounded by: Vellerat, Châtillon, Rossemaison, Delémont, Courroux, Rebeuvelier, Roches (BE)
- Website: www.courrendlin.ch

Courrendlin (French pronunciation: [kuʁɑ̃dlɛ̃]; Franc-Comtois: Coérrendlïn) is a municipality in the district of Delémont in the canton of Jura in Switzerland. On 1 January 2019 the former municipalities of Rebeuvelier and Vellerat merged into the municipality of Courrendlin.

== History ==
Courrendlin is first mentioned in 866 as Rendelana Corte.

== Geography ==
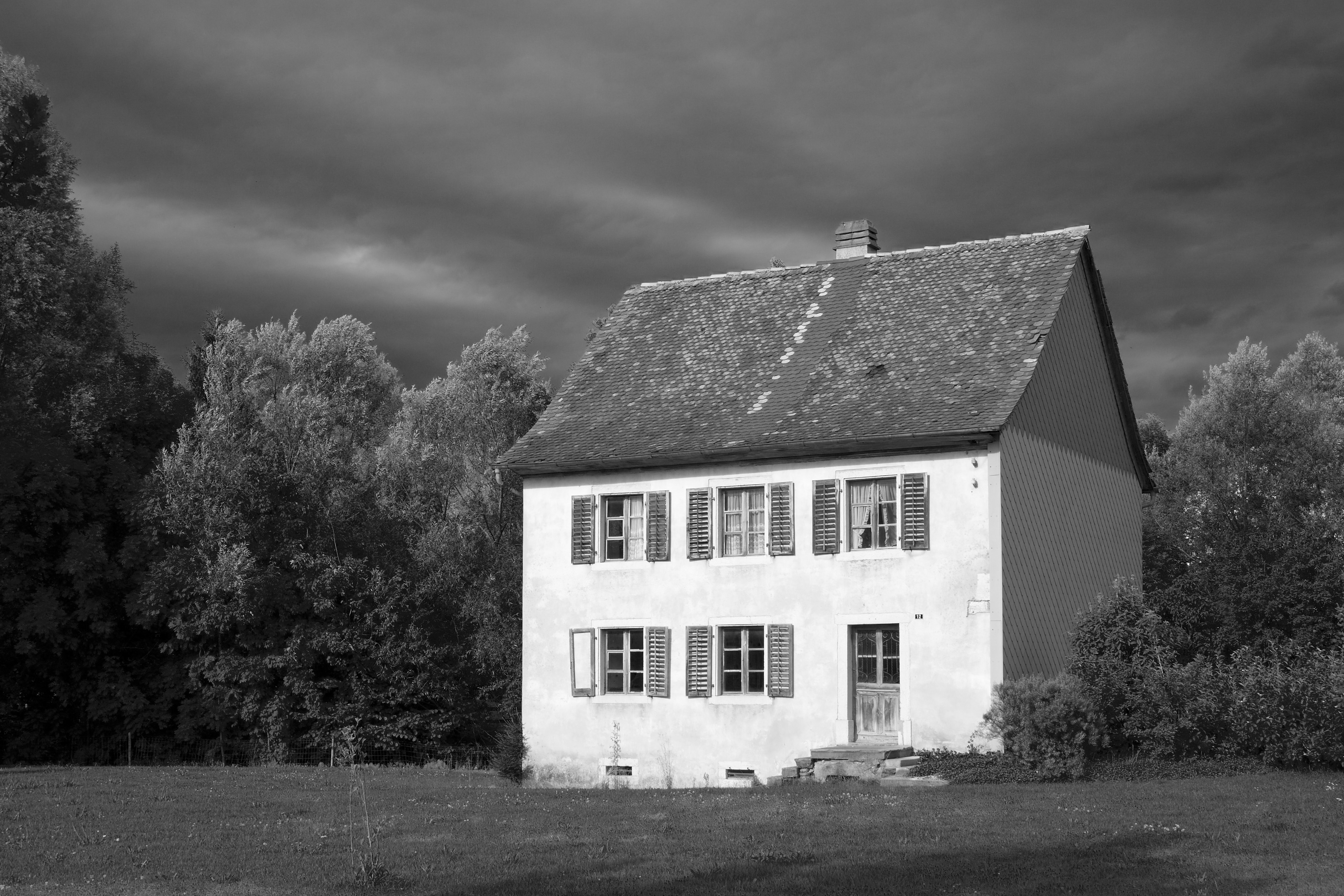
Old home in Courrendlin

Aerial view (1955)

Courrendlin has an area of 11.09 km^{2} (4.28 sq mi). Of this area, 4.79 km^{2} (1.85 mi^{2}) or 43.2% is used for agricultural purposes, while 4.4 km^{2} (1.7 mi^{2}) or 39.7% is forested. Of the rest of the land, 1.67 km^{2} (0.64 mi^{2}) or 15.1% is settled (buildings or roads), 0.1 km^{2} (25 acres) or 0.9% is either rivers or lakes and 0.07 km^{2} (17 acres) or 0.6% is unproductive land.

Of the built up area, industrial buildings made up 2.9% of the total area while housing and buildings made up 5.7% and transportation infrastructure made up 3.6%. Power and water infrastructure as well as other special developed areas made up 2.6% of the area Out of the forested land, all of the forested land area is covered with heavy forests. Of the agricultural land, 25.5% is used for growing crops and 12.1% is pastures and 5.1% is used for alpine pastures. All the water in the municipality is flowing water.

The municipality is located in the Delemont district, on the Birs river as it flows out of Moutier canyon. It consists of the old linear village of Courrendlin on the right side of the river, the train station and newer housing developments on the left bank and the foundry complex of Choindez south of the village.

== Coat of arms ==
The blazon of the municipal coat of arms is Argent, a Falcon Azure langued and belled Gules statant on Coupeaux Vert.

== Demographics ==
Courrendlin has a population (as of December 2020) of 3,631. As of 2016, 21.1% of the population are resident foreign nationals. Over the last 6 years (2010-2016) the population has changed at a rate of 12.40%. The birth rate in the municipality, in 2016, was 12.0, while the death rate was 10.9 per thousand residents.

Most of the population (as of 2000) speaks French (2,152 or 88.4%) as their first language, German is the second most common (127 or 5.2%) and Italian is the third (44 or 1.8%). There is 1 person who speaks Romansh.

As of 2008, the population was 49.8% male and 50.2% female. The population was made up of 1,008 Swiss men (40.7% of the population) and 225 (9.1%) non-Swiss men. There were 1,036 Swiss women (41.8%) and 208 (8.4%) non-Swiss women. Of the population in the municipality, 823 or about 33.8% were born in Courrendlin and lived there in 2000. There were 753 or 30.9% who were born in the same canton, while 437 or 17.9% were born somewhere else in Switzerland, and 361 or 14.8% were born outside of Switzerland.

As of 2016, children and teenagers (0–19 years old) make up 24.0% of the population, while adults (20–64 years old) are 59.1% of the population and seniors (over 64 years old) make up 16.9%. In 2015 there were 1,237 single residents, 1,207 people who were married or in a civil partnership, 139 widows or widowers and 200 divorced residents.

As of 2000, there were 968 private households in the municipality, and an average of 2.5 persons per household. There were 271 households that consist of only one person and 73 households with five or more people. In 2000, a total of 946 apartments (89.9% of the total) were permanently occupied, while 54 apartments (5.1%) were seasonally occupied and 52 apartments (4.9%) were empty. As of 2009, the construction rate of new housing units was 5.7 new units per 1000 residents. The vacancy rate for the municipality, in 2010, was 5.3%.

The historical population is given in the following chart:

== Sights ==
The entire Choindez area is designated as part of the Inventory of Swiss Heritage Sites.

== Politics ==
In the 2015 federal election the most popular party was the SP with 31.2% of the vote. The next three most popular parties were the SVP (22.1%), the CVP (18.7%) and the FDP (10.1%). In the federal election, a total of 794 votes were cast, and the voter turnout was 52.7%.

In the 2007 federal election the most popular party was the SP which received 47.24% of the vote. The next three most popular parties were the SVP (16.81%), the CVP (14.55%) and the FDP (13.46%). In the federal election, a total of 659 votes were cast, and the voter turnout was 41.1%.

== Economy ==
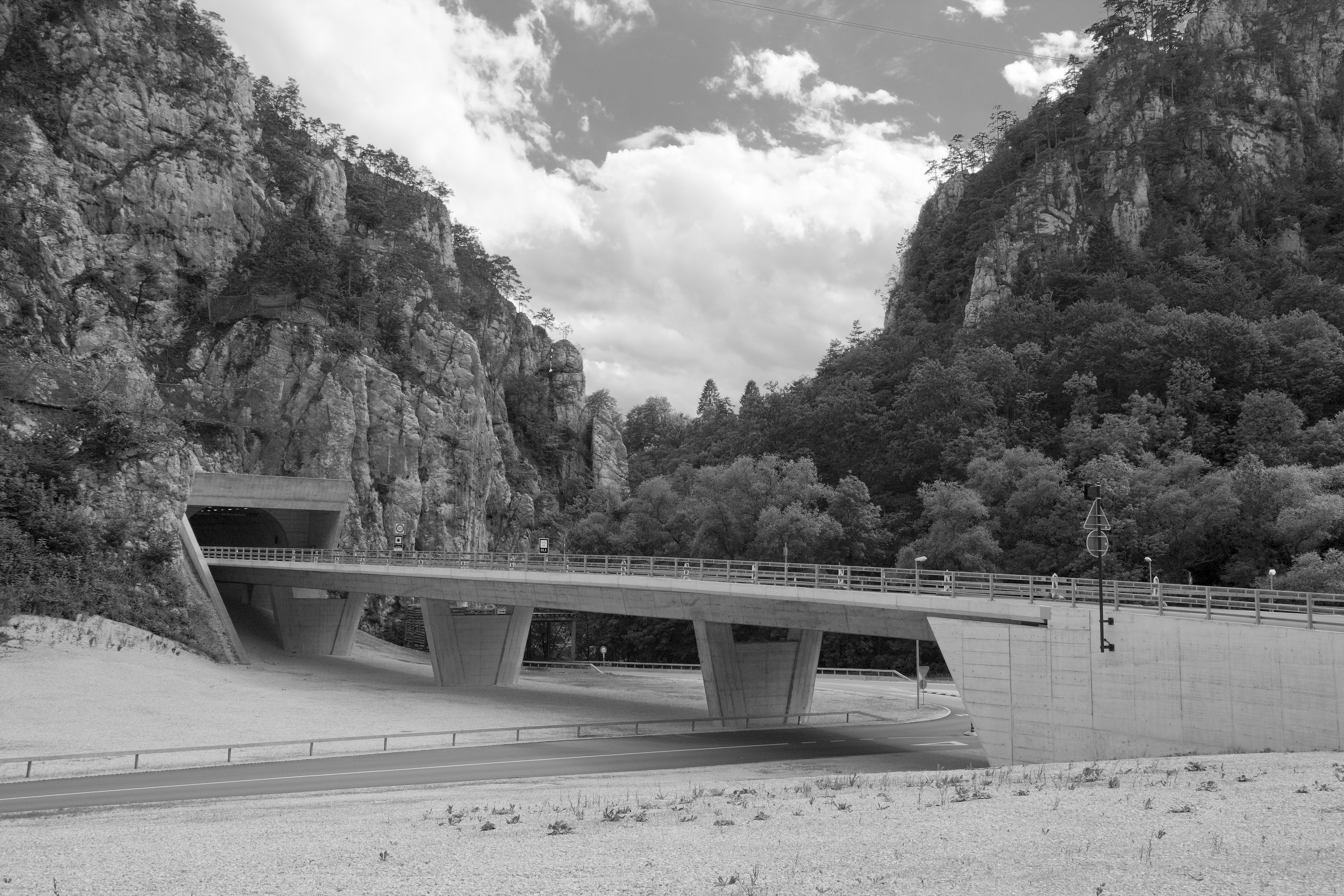
A16 motorway bridge at Choindez

Courrendlin is a periurbane community. The municipality is part of the agglomeration of Delémont. As of 2014, there were a total of 743 people employed in the municipality. Of these, 36 people worked in 18 businesses in the primary economic sector. The secondary sector employed 323 workers in 45 separate businesses, with one business employing 124 workers. Finally, the tertiary sector provided 384 jobs in 105 businesses. In 2016 a total of 12.2% of the population received social assistance.

In 2011 the unemployment rate in the municipality was 5.6%.

In 2015 the average cantonal, municipal and church tax rate in the municipality for a couple with two children making SFr 80,000 was 6% while the rate for a single person making SFr 150,000 was 20%, both of which are close to the average for the canton. The canton has a slightly higher than average tax rate for those making SFr 80,000 and a slightly higher than average rate for those making SFr 150,000. In 2013 the average income in the municipality per tax payer was SFr 65,140 and the per person average was SFr 24,146, which is less than the cantonal average of SFr 66,925 and SFr 26,992 respectively It is also less than the national per tax payer average of SFr 82,682 and the per person average of SFr 35,825.

In 2008 the total number of full-time equivalent jobs was 601. The number of jobs in the primary sector was 27, of which 26 were in agriculture and 1 was in forestry or lumber production. The number of jobs in the secondary sector was 260 of which 193 or (74.2%) were in manufacturing and 65 (25.0%) were in construction. The number of jobs in the tertiary sector was 314. In the tertiary sector; 123 or 39.2% were in wholesale or retail sales or the repair of motor vehicles, 29 or 9.2% were in the movement and storage of goods, 18 or 5.7% were in a hotel or restaurant, 4 or 1.3% were in the information industry, 3 or 1.0% were the insurance or financial industry, 15 or 4.8% were technical professionals or scientists, 33 or 10.5% were in education and 23 or 7.3% were in health care.

In 2000, there were 602 workers who commuted into the municipality and 872 workers who commuted away. The municipality is a net exporter of workers, with about 1.4 workers leaving the municipality for every one entering. About 6.0% of the workforce coming into Courrendlin are coming from outside Switzerland. Of the working population, 15.5% used public transportation to get to work, and 65% used a private car.

== Religion ==
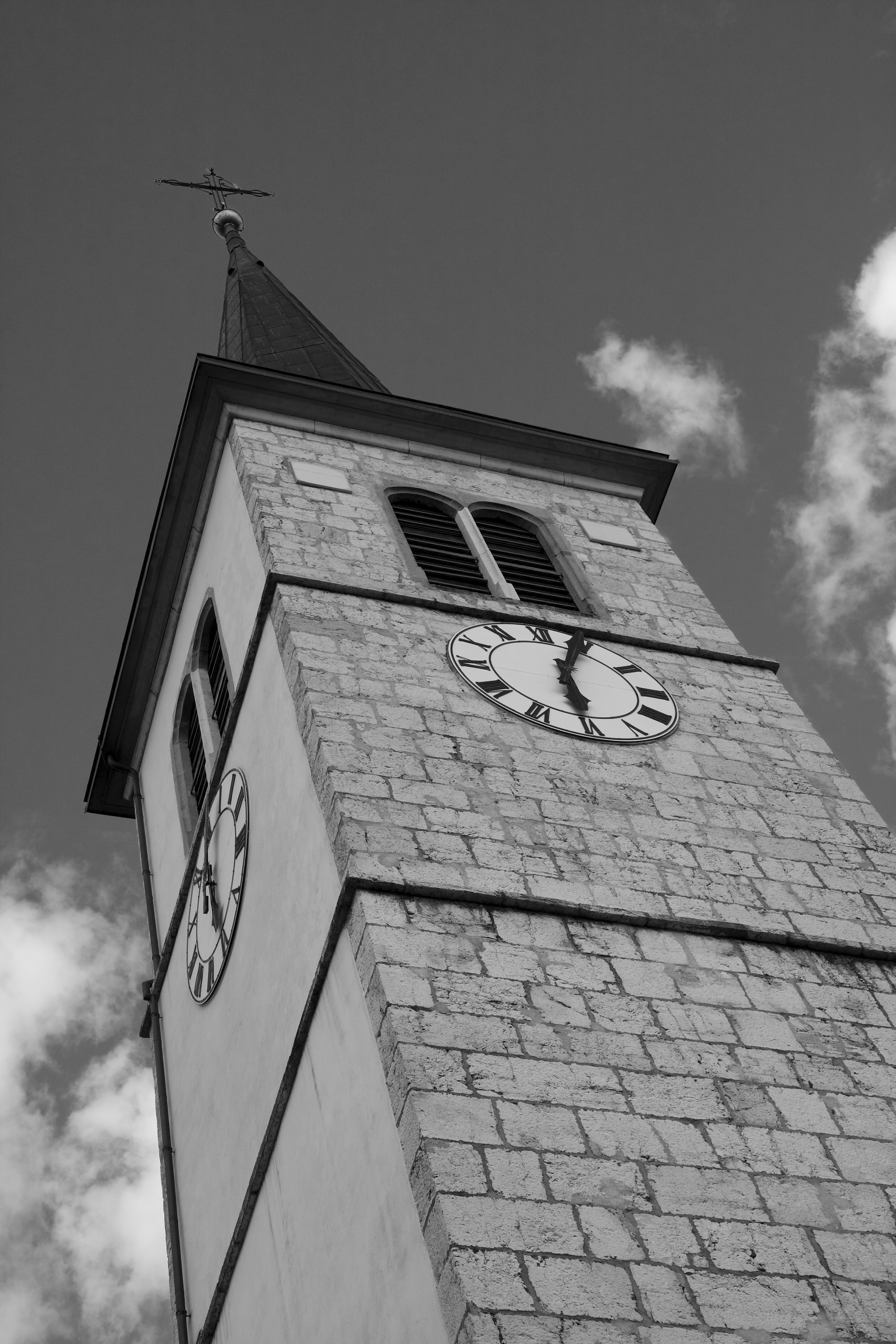
Courrendlin church tower

From the 2000 census, 1,698 or 69.7% were Roman Catholic, while 391 or 16.1% belonged to the Swiss Reformed Church. Of the rest of the population, there was 1 member of an Orthodox church, there were 2 individuals (or about 0.08% of the population) who belonged to the Christian Catholic Church, and there were 103 individuals (or about 4.23% of the population) who belonged to another Christian church. There were 74 (or about 3.04% of the population) who were Islamic. There were 2 individuals who were Buddhist, 1 person who was Hindu and 2 individuals who belonged to another church. 137 (or about 5.63% of the population) belonged to no church, are agnostic or atheist, and 75 individuals (or about 3.08% of the population) did not answer the question.

== Education ==
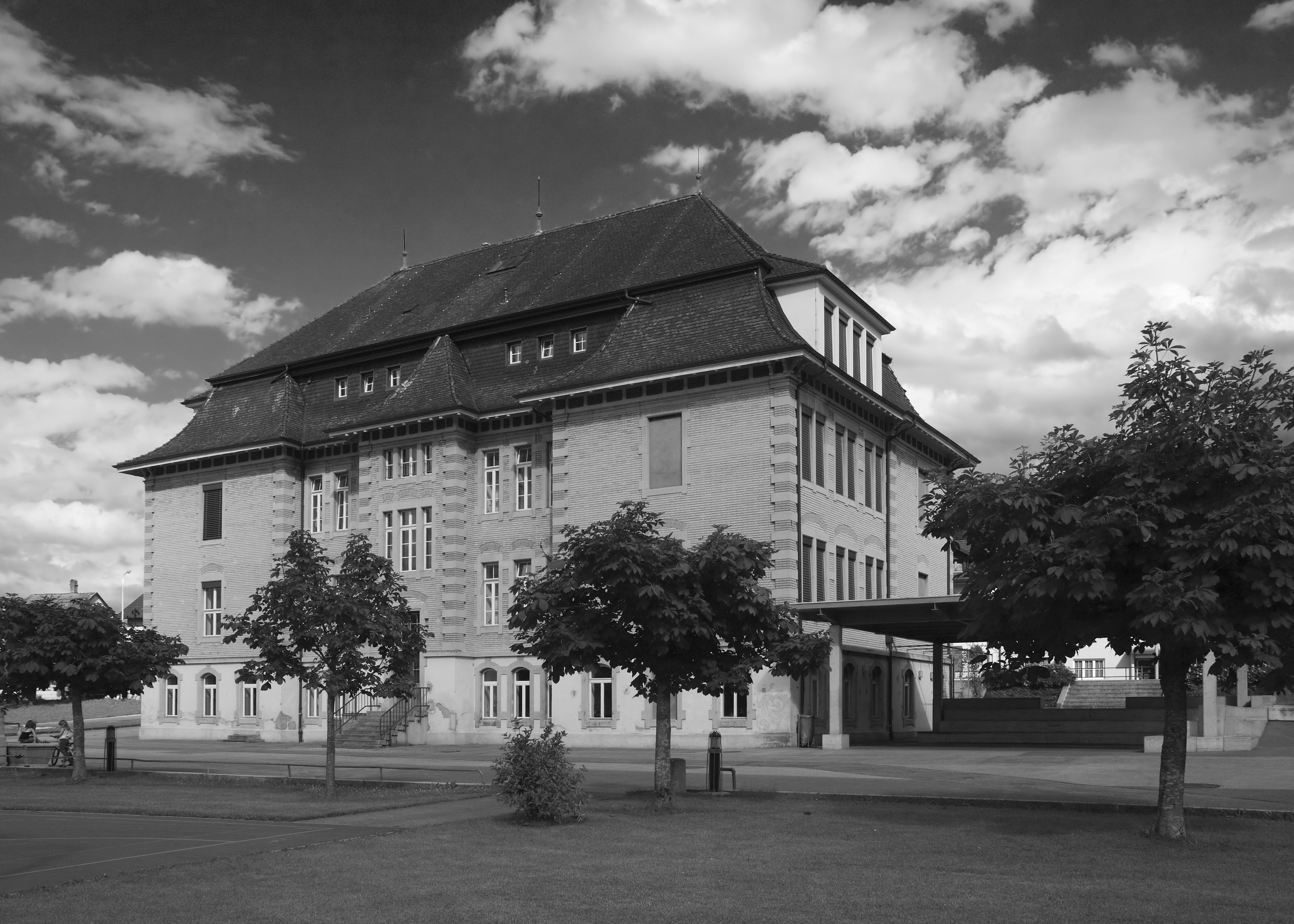
Courrendlin school house

In Courrendlin about 889 or (36.5%) of the population have completed non-mandatory upper secondary education, and 177 or (7.3%) have completed additional higher education (either university or a Fachhochschule). Of the 177 who completed tertiary schooling, 64.4% were Swiss men, 25.4% were Swiss women, 7.9% were non-Swiss men.

The Canton of Jura school system provides two year of non-obligatory Kindergarten, followed by six years of Primary school. This is followed by three years of obligatory lower Secondary school where the students are separated according to ability and aptitude. Following the lower Secondary students may attend a three or four year optional upper Secondary school followed by some form of Tertiary school or they may enter an apprenticeship.

During the 2009-10 school year, there were a total of 127 students attending 7 classes in Courrendlin. There were no kindergarten classes in the municipality. The municipality had no primary school classes, all the students attended school in a neighboring school. During the same year, there were 7 lower secondary classes with a total of 127 students.

As of 2000, there were 46 students in Courrendlin who came from another municipality, while 85 residents attended schools outside the municipality.
