= Grandval, Switzerland =

Grandval
- Municipality
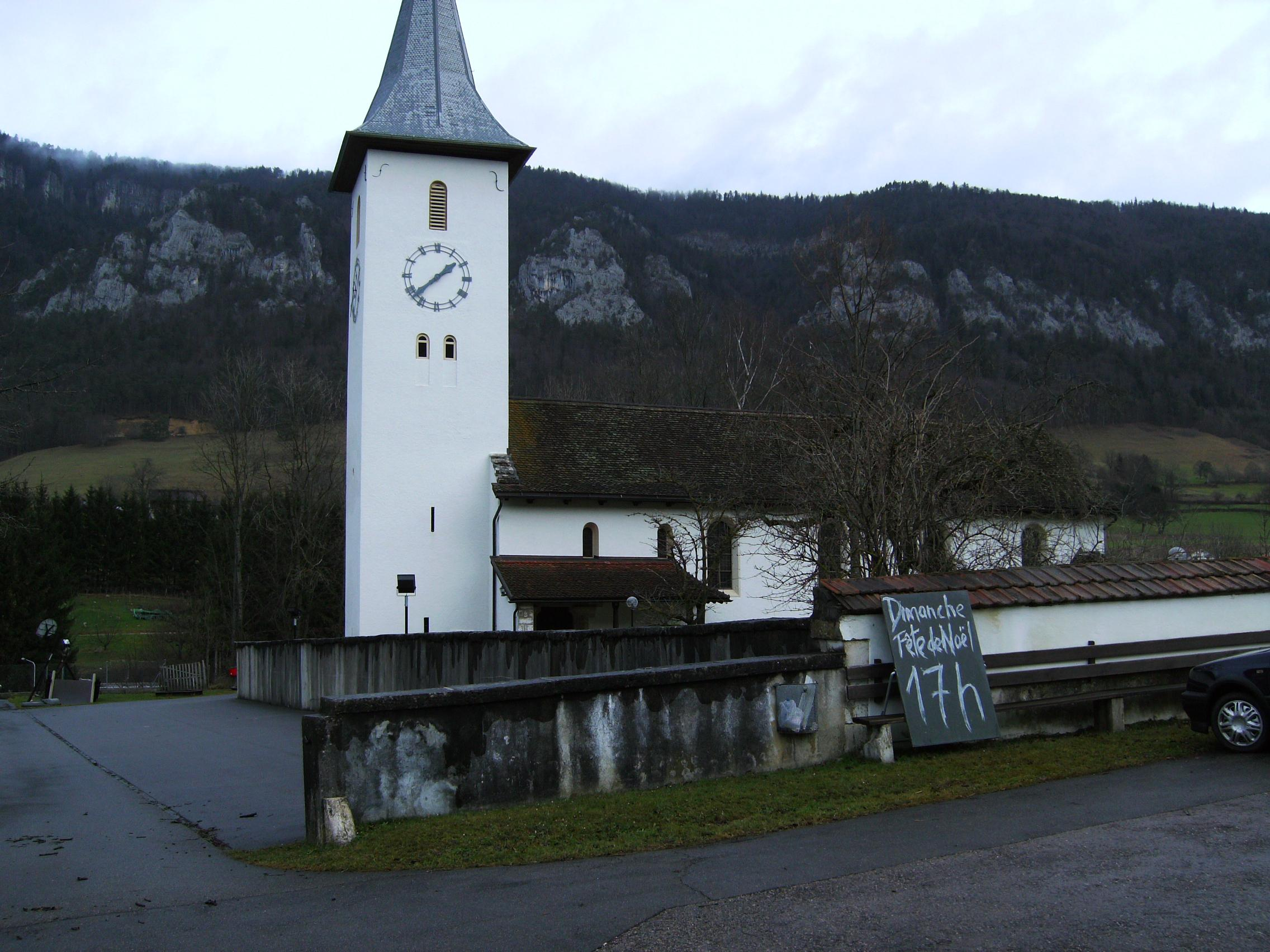
- Village Church of Grandval

- Flag Coat of arms
- Location of Grandval
- Location within Switzerland Location within Canton of Bern
- Coordinates: 47°17′N 7°26′E
- Country: Switzerland
- Canton: Bern
- District: Jura bernois

Government
  - Mayor: Maire; Ian Laubscher

Area
  - Total: 8.21 km^{2} (3.17 sq mi)
- Elevation: 588 m (1,929 ft)

Population (Dec 2011)
  - Total: 340
  - Density: 41/km^{2} (110/sq mi)
- Time zone: UTC+01:00 (CET)
  - Summer (DST): UTC+02:00 (CEST)
- Postal code: 2745
- SFOS number: 694
- ISO 3166 code: CH-BE
- Surrounded by: Eschert, Belprahon, Roches, Crémines, Rebeuvelier (JU), Gänsbrunnen (SO)
- Website: www.grandval.ch

Grandval (French pronunciation: [ɡʁɑ̃val]) is a municipality in the Jura bernois administrative district in the canton of Bern in Switzerland. It is located in the French-speaking Bernese Jura (Jura Bernois). Grandval also used to be known under its German name Granfel or Granfelden, but these forms are no longer commonly used.

== History ==
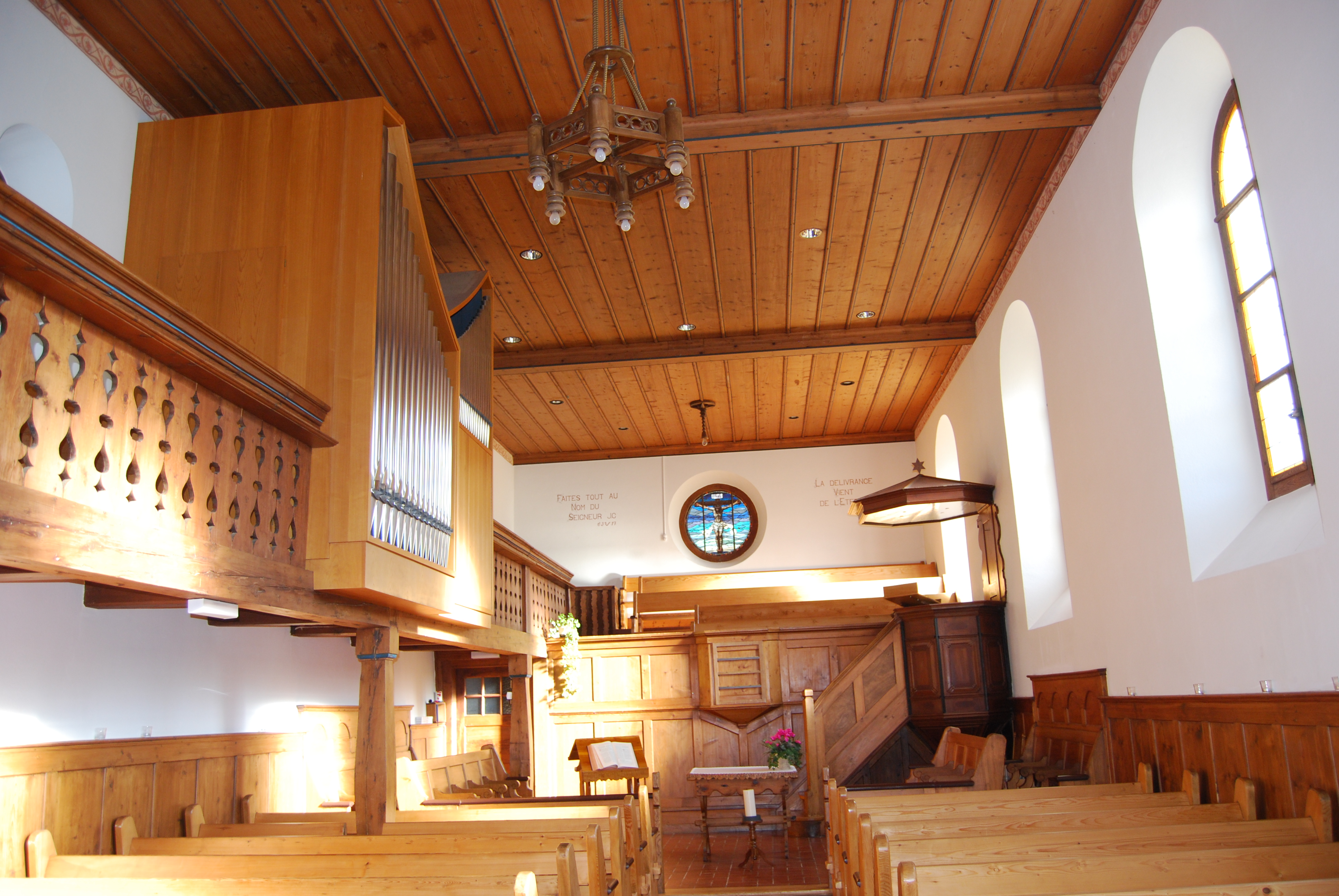
Interior of Grandval parish church

The oldest evidence of a settlement in the area is a reasonable well preserved section of a Roman road. Around 640 what became the Moutier-Grandval Abbey was established outside the village of Grandval. The town of Moutier then developed around the Abbey complex.

Grandval is first mentioned around 900 as Grandemvallem.

The village chapel of St. Martin was first mentioned in 962. By the 14th century it had become the parish church for Grandval parish, which included most of the communities in the Grand Val/Moutier valley. In 1531 the village, its church and the parish converted to the new faith of the Protestant Reformation. Beginning in 1663 the church was almost constantly under construction for several centuries. Major reconstruction projects happened in 1701-06 and 1927.

For most of its history, the village of Grandval was owned by the Abbey. After the 1797 French victory and the Treaty of Campo Formio, Grandval became part of the French Département of Mont-Terrible. Three years later, in 1800 it became part of the Département of Haut-Rhin. After Napoleon's defeat and the Congress of Vienna, Grandval was assigned to the Canton of Bern in 1815.

Until about 1900, the local economy was still dominated by agriculture with a few cottage industries that manufactured pottery, watch parts and arquebuses. This began to change with the growth of the machinery manufacturing industry in nearby Moutier and the construction of the Solothurn-Moutier railroad in 1904-08. A number of industrial factories settled in Crémines and remained. Today over half of the working population is in the industrial sector.

== Geography ==
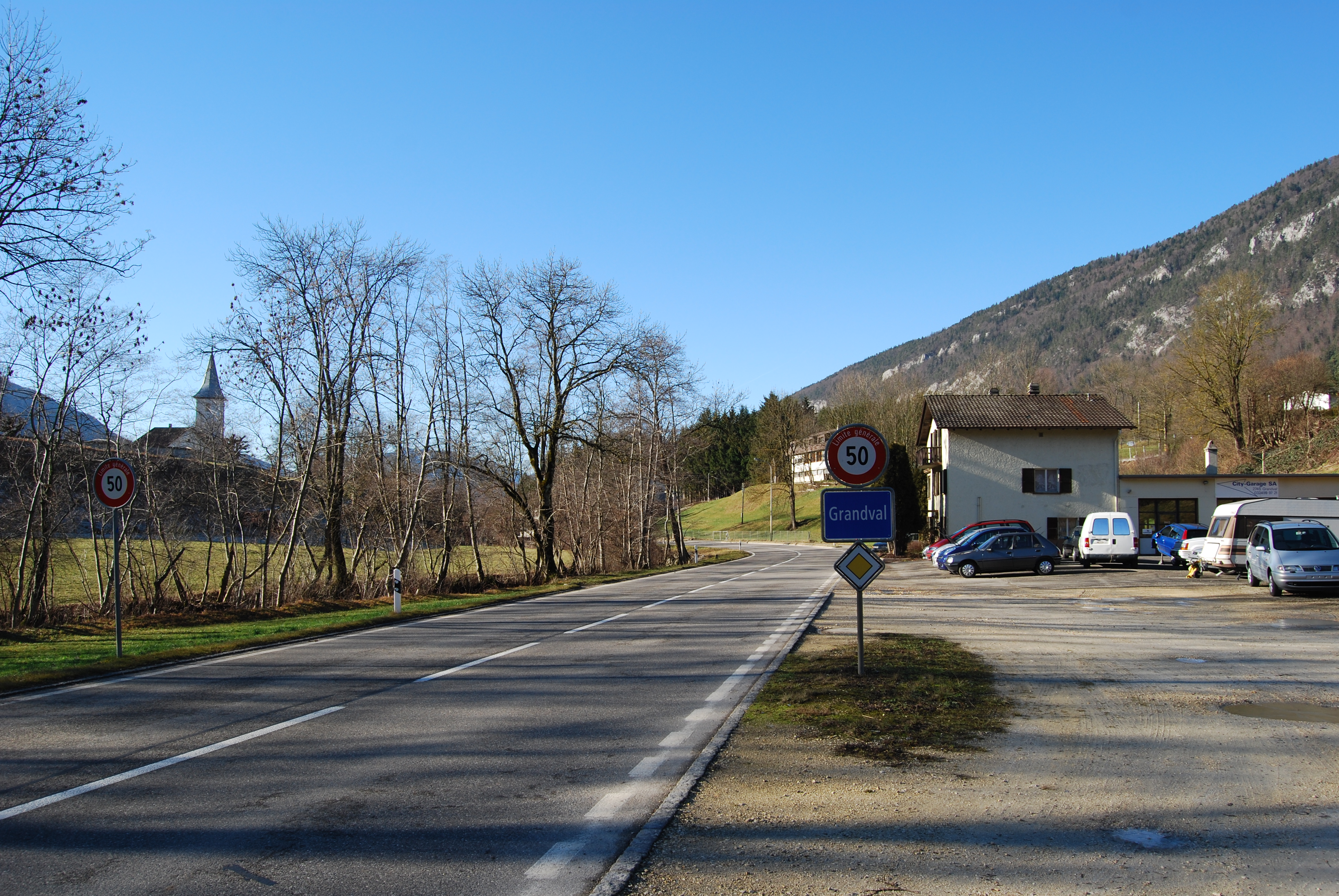
Grandval

Grandval has an area of 8.25 km^{2} (3.19 sq mi). As of 2012, a total of 3.64 km^{2} (1.41 mi^{2}) or 44.2% is used for agricultural purposes, while 4.15 km^{2} (1.60 mi^{2}) or 50.4% is forested. Of the rest of the land, 0.34 km^{2} (0.13 mi^{2}) or 4.1% is settled (buildings or roads), 0.02 km^{2} (4.9 acres) or 0.2% is either rivers or lakes and 0.04 km^{2} (9.9 acres) or 0.5% is unproductive land.

During the same year, housing and buildings made up 2.1% and transportation infrastructure made up 1.3%. Out of the forested land, 44.2% of the total land area is heavily forested and 6.2% is covered with orchards or small clusters of trees. Of the agricultural land, 9.6% is used for growing crops and 13.2% is pastures and 21.0% is used for alpine pastures. All the water in the municipality is flowing water.

The municipality is located in the Grand Val (valley of Moutier), but some scattered houses are located on a part of Mont Raimeux.

On 31 December 2009 District de Moutier, the municipality's former district, was dissolved. On the following day, 1 January 2010, it joined the newly created Arrondissement administratif Jura bernois.

== Coat of arms ==
The blazon of the municipal coat of arms is Per fess Gules and Or a Letter G counterchanged.

== Demographics ==
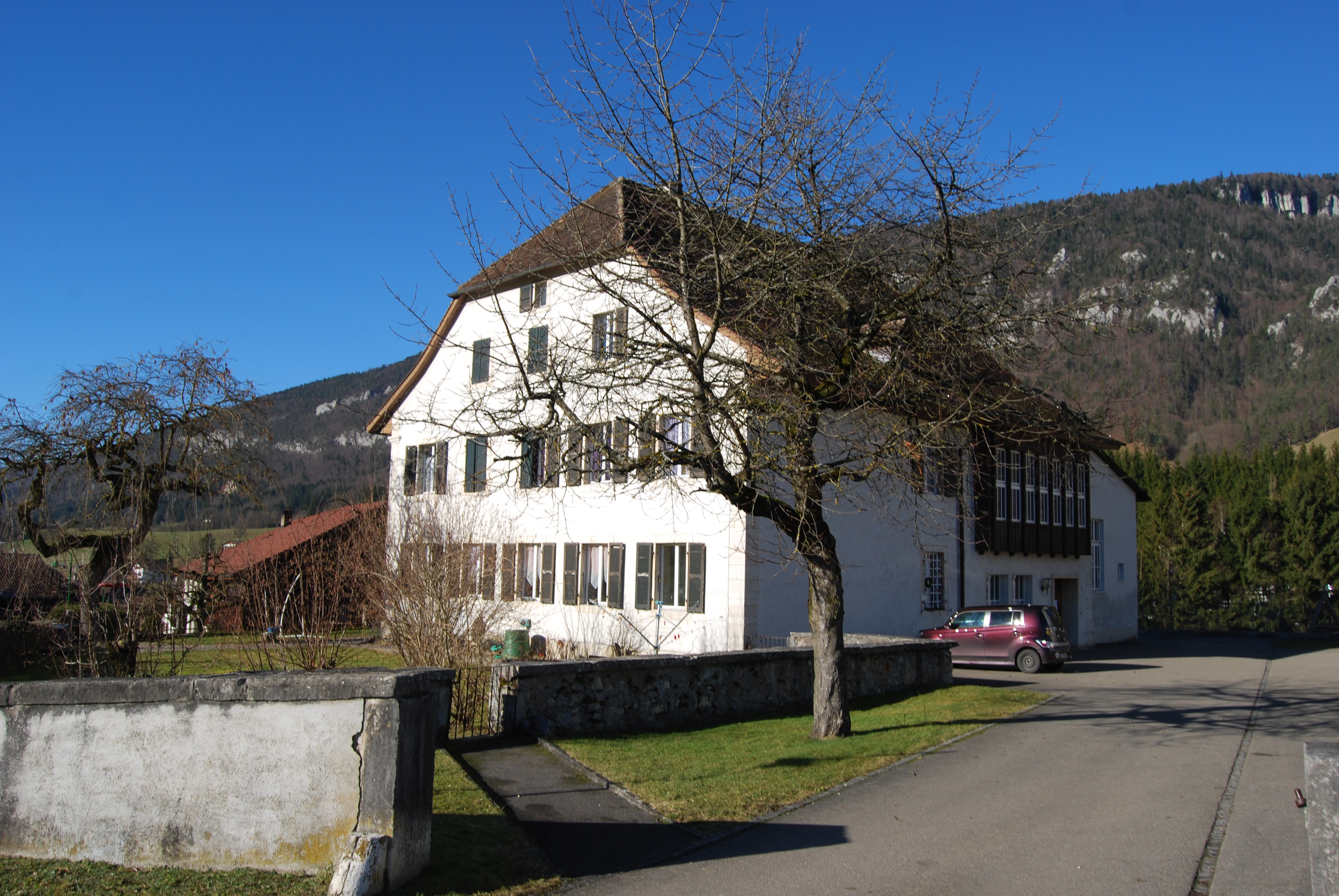
Buildings in Grandval

Grandval has a population (as of December 2020) of 388. As of 2010, 5.7% of the population are resident foreign nationals. Over the last 10 years (2001-2011) the population has changed at a rate of -2.9%. Migration accounted for -2.9%, while births and deaths accounted for -0.3%.

Most of the population (as of 2000) speaks French (315 or 85.6%) as their first language, German is the second most common (44 or 12.0%) and Italian is the third (3 or 0.8%). There is 1 person who speaks Romansh.

As of 2008, the population was 49.1% male and 50.9% female. The population was made up of 158 Swiss men (45.1% of the population) and 14 (4.0%) non-Swiss men. There were 172 Swiss women (49.1%) and 6 (1.7%) non-Swiss women. Of the population in the municipality, 104 or about 28.3% were born in Grandval and lived there in 2000. There were 141 or 38.3% who were born in the same canton, while 76 or 20.7% were born somewhere else in Switzerland, and 33 or 9.0% were born outside of Switzerland.

As of 2011, children and teenagers (0–19 years old) make up 17.9% of the population, while adults (20–64 years old) make up 63.2% and seniors (over 64 years old) make up 18.8%.

As of 2000, there were 158 people who were single and never married in the municipality. There were 166 married individuals, 31 widows or widowers and 13 individuals who are divorced.

As of 2010, there were 42 households that consist of only one person and 11 households with five or more people. In 2000, a total of 136 apartments (84.0% of the total) were permanently occupied, while 20 apartments (12.3%) were seasonally occupied and 6 apartments (3.7%) were empty. As of 2010, the construction rate of new housing units was 2.9 new units per 1000 residents. In 2011, single family homes made up 54.0% of the total housing in the municipality.

The historical population is given in the following chart:

== Heritage sites of national significance ==
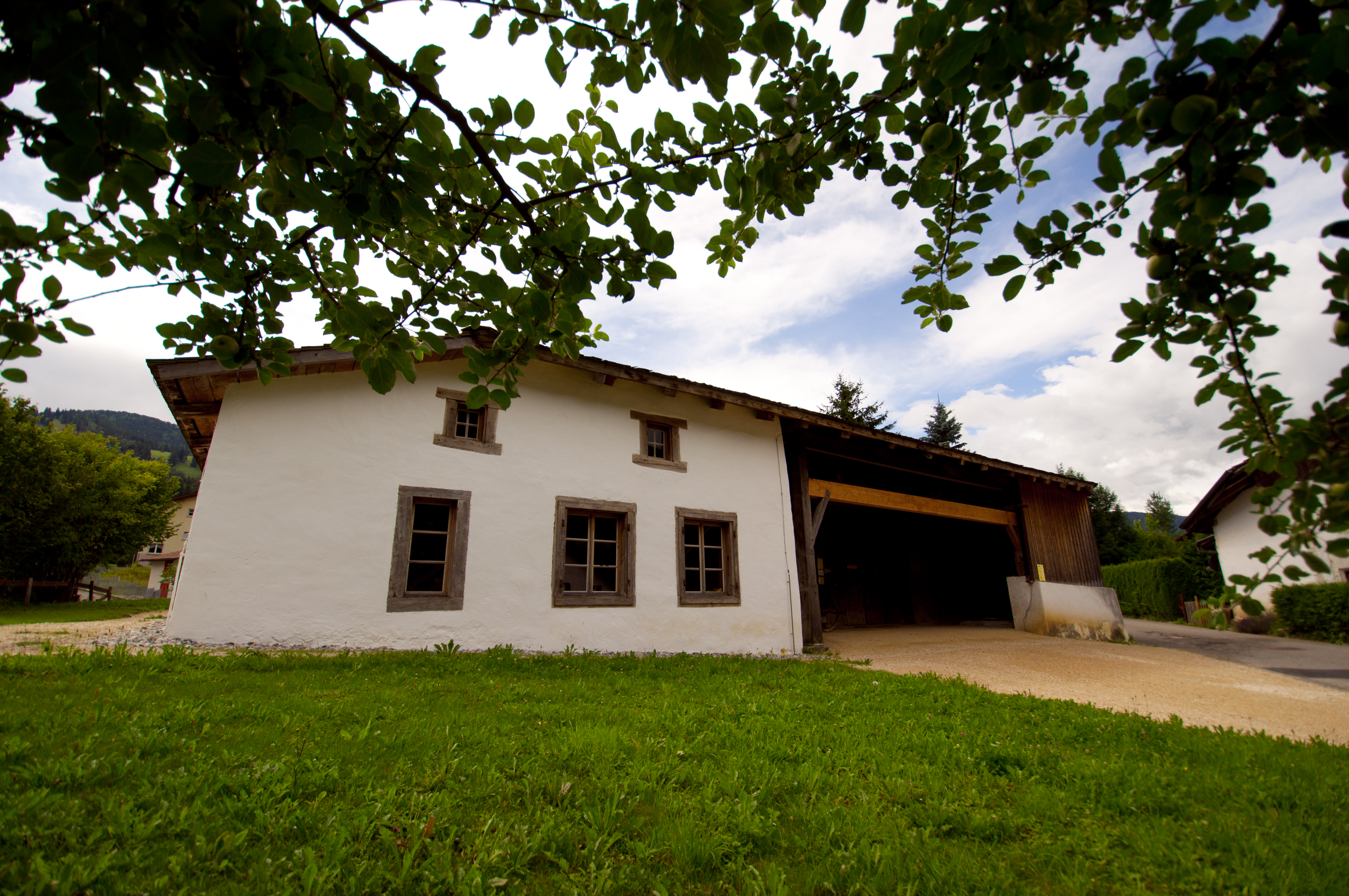
The Maison du Banneret Wisard in Grandval

The Maison De La Dîme and the Maison du Banneret Wisard are listed as Swiss heritage site of national significance.

== Politics ==
In the 2011 federal election the most popular party was the Swiss People's Party (SVP) which received 29.9% of the vote. The next three most popular parties were another local party (18.7%), the Social Democratic Party (SP) (14.9%) and the Green Party (9%). In the federal election, a total of 108 votes were cast, and the voter turnout was 40.3%.

== Economy ==
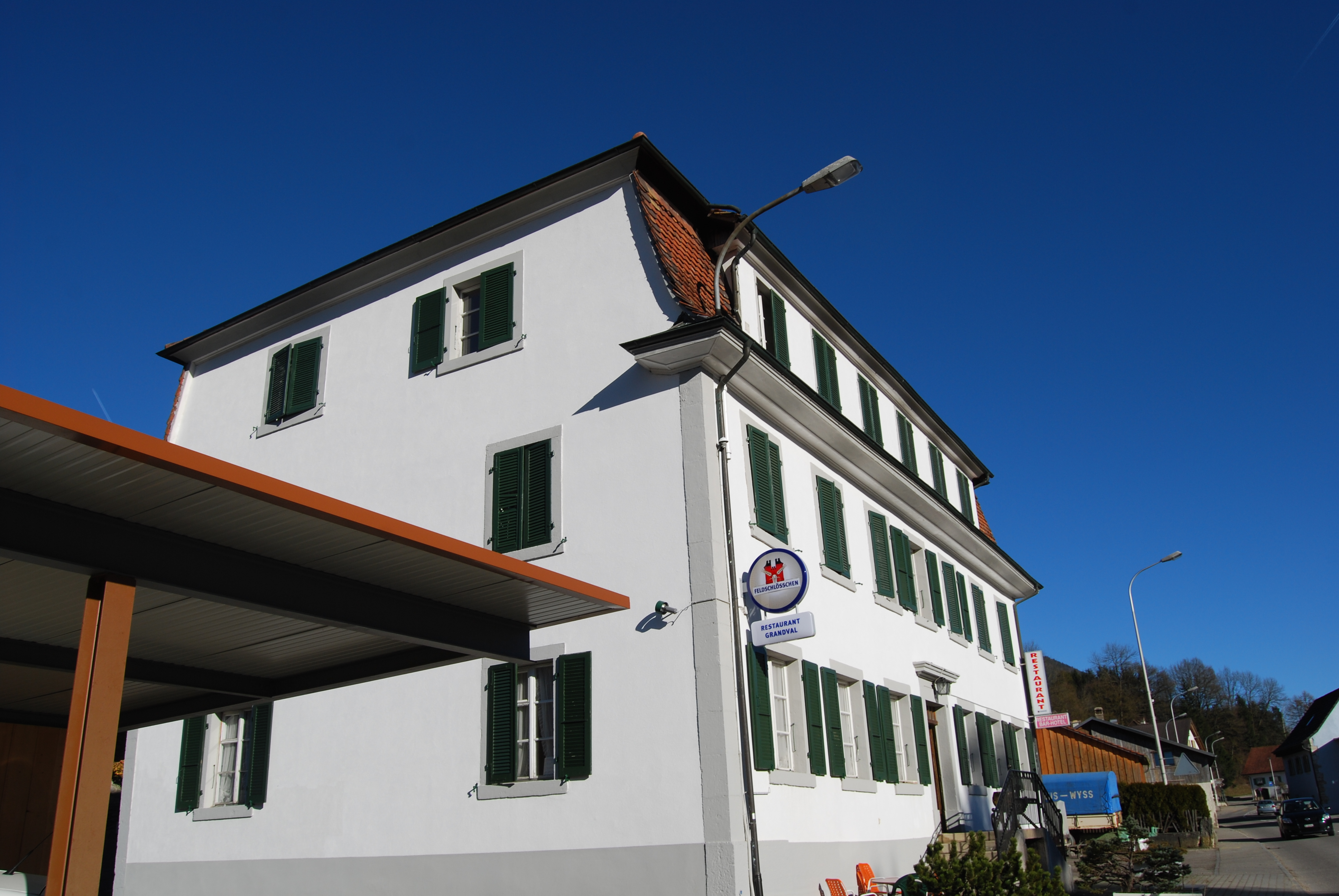
Restaurant Grandval in Grandval village

As of 2011, Grandval had an unemployment rate of 2.23%. As of 2008, there were a total of 92 people employed in the municipality. Of these, there were 22 people employed in the primary economic sector and about 10 businesses involved in this sector. 32 people were employed in the secondary sector and there were 6 businesses in this sector. 38 people were employed in the tertiary sector, with 8 businesses in this sector. There were 188 residents of the municipality who were employed in some capacity, of which females made up 39.9% of the workforce.

In 2008 there were a total of 69 full-time equivalent jobs. The number of jobs in the primary sector was 13, all of which were in agriculture. The number of jobs in the secondary sector was 26 of which 21 or (80.8%) were in manufacturing and 5 (19.2%) were in construction. The number of jobs in the tertiary sector was 30. In the tertiary sector; 8 or 26.7% were in wholesale or retail sales or the repair of motor vehicles, 8 or 26.7% were in a hotel or restaurant, 8 or 26.7% were in education.

In 2000, there were 27 workers who commuted into the municipality and 122 workers who commuted away. The municipality is a net exporter of workers, with about 4.5 workers leaving the municipality for every one entering. A total of 66 workers (71.0% of the 93 total workers in the municipality) both lived and worked in Grandval. Of the working population, 13.8% used public transportation to get to work, and 50.5% used a private car.

In 2011 the average local and cantonal tax rate on a married resident, with two children, of Grandval making 150,000 CHF was 12.7%, while an unmarried resident's rate was 18.7%. For comparison, the rate for the entire canton in the same year, was 14.2% and 22.0%, while the nationwide rate was 12.3% and 21.1% respectively. In 2009 there were a total of 164 tax payers in the municipality. Of that total, 40 made over 75,000 CHF per year. There were 4 people who made between 15,000 and 20,000 per year. The average income of the over 75,000 CHF group in Grandval was 98,070 CHF, while the average across all of Switzerland was 130,478 CHF. In 2011 a total of 0.6% of the population received direct financial assistance from the government.

== Religion ==
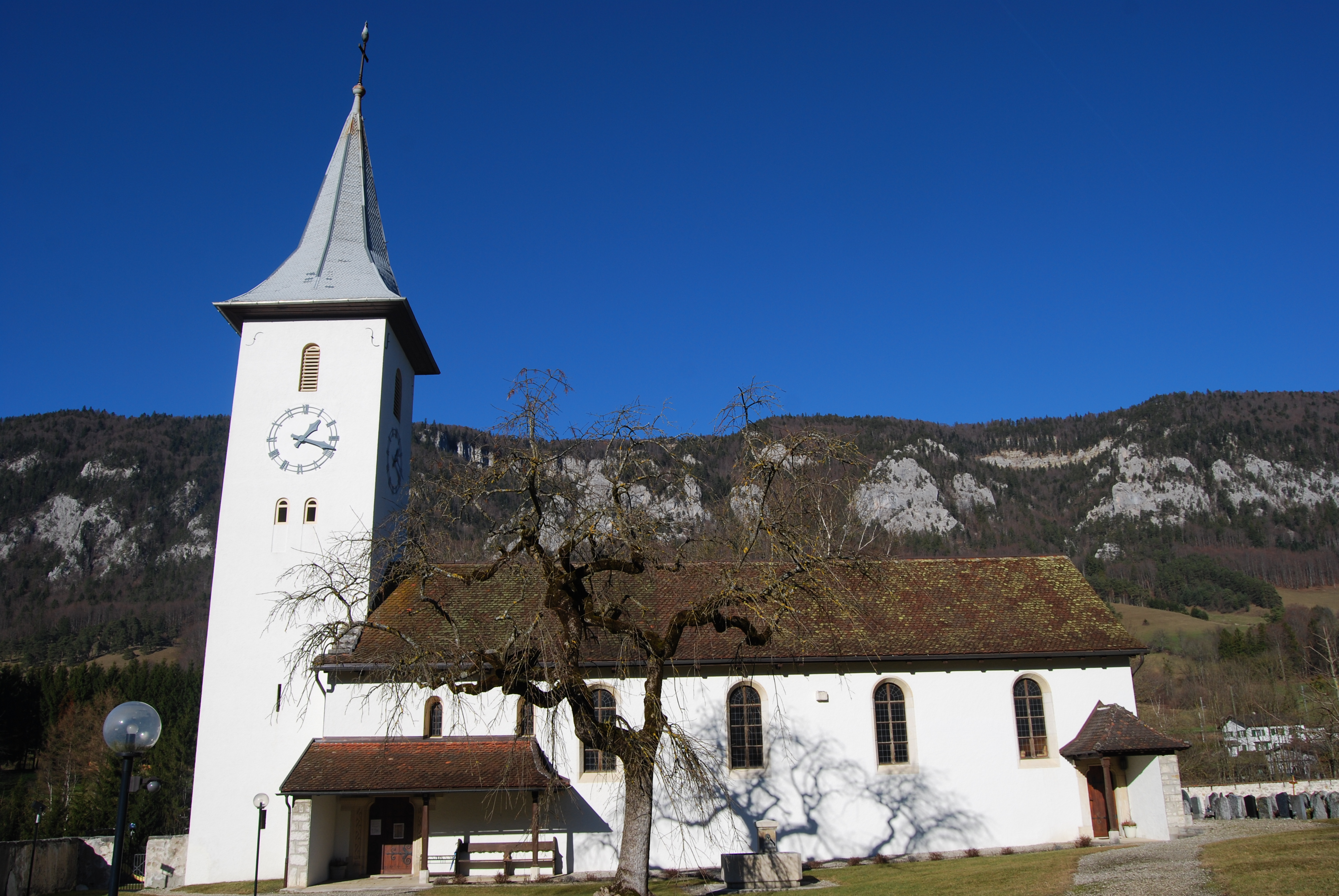
Grandval's Reformed parish church

From the 2000 census, 195 or 53.0% belonged to the Swiss Reformed Church, while 96 or 26.1% were Roman Catholic. Of the rest of the population, there were 28 individuals (or about 7.61% of the population) who belonged to another Christian church. There were 3 (or about 0.82% of the population) who were Islamic. 35 (or about 9.51% of the population) belonged to no church, are agnostic or atheist, and 11 individuals (or about 2.99% of the population) did not answer the question.

== Education ==
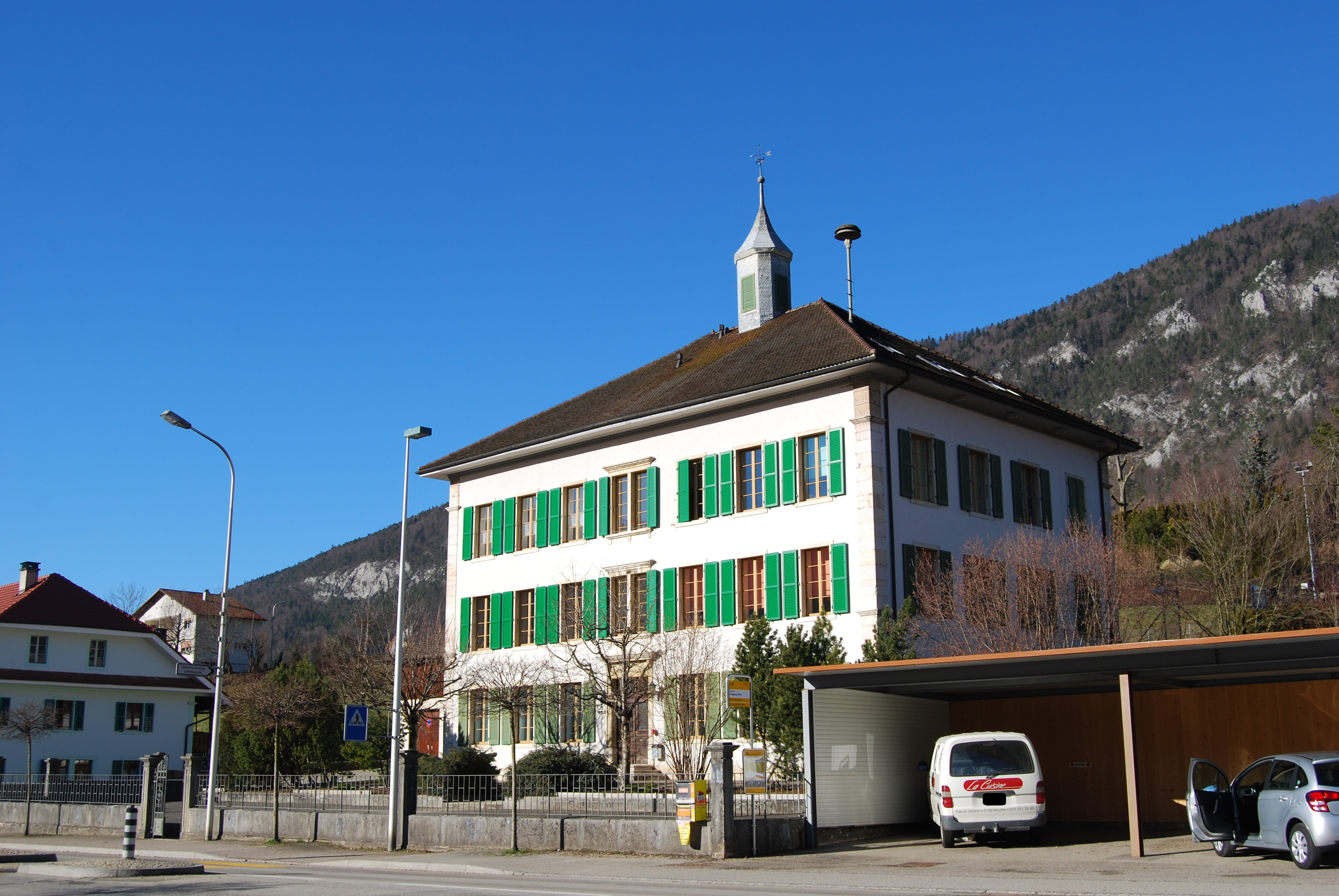
Grandval school house

In Grandval about 51.1% of the population have completed non-mandatory upper secondary education, and 8.1% have completed additional higher education (either university or a Fachhochschule). Of the 16 who had completed some form of tertiary schooling listed in the census, 62.5% were Swiss men, 31.3% were Swiss women.

The Canton of Bern school system provides one year of non-obligatory Kindergarten, followed by six years of Primary school. This is followed by three years of obligatory lower Secondary school where the students are separated according to ability and aptitude. Following the lower Secondary students may attend additional schooling or they may enter an apprenticeship.

During the 2011-12 school year, there were a total of 35 students attending classes in Grandval. There were no kindergarten classes and one primary class with 16 students. Of the primary students, 18.8% were permanent or temporary residents of Switzerland (not citizens) and 12.5% have a different mother language than the classroom language. During the same year, there was one lower secondary class with a total of 19 students. 5.3% have a different mother language than the classroom language.

As of 2000, there were a total of 55 students attending any school in the municipality. Of those, 15 both lived and attended school in the municipality, while 40 students came from another municipality. During the same year, 46 residents attended schools outside the municipality.
