= Châtillon, Canton of Jura =

Châtillon
- Municipality
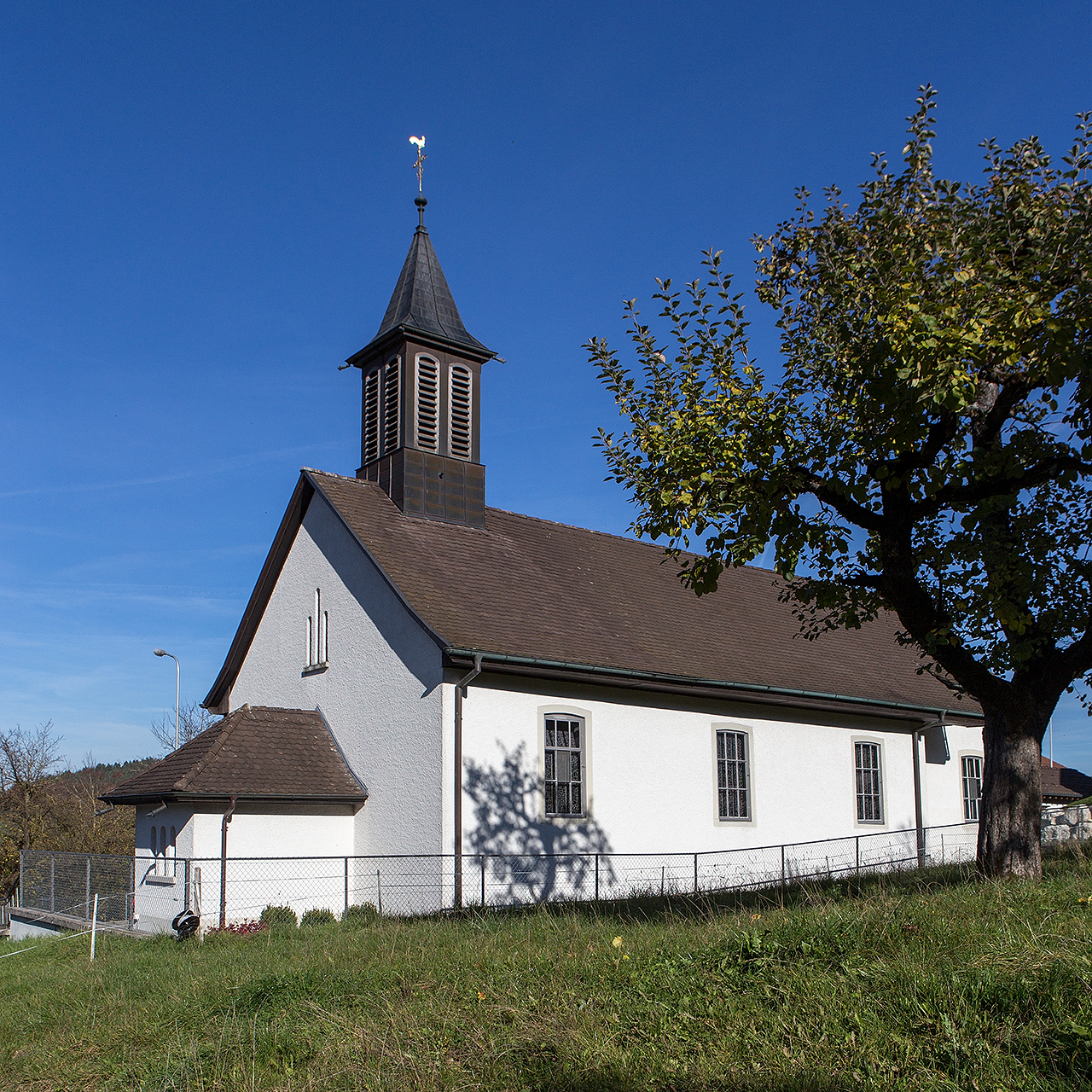

- Coat of arms
- Location of Châtillon
- Location within Switzerland Location within Canton of Jura
- Coordinates: 47°19′N 07°20′E
- Country: Switzerland
- Canton: Jura
- District: Delémont

Government
  - Executive: Conseil communal with 5 members
  - Mayor: Maire; Silvio Mittempergher (as of 2026)

Area
  - Total: 5.33 km^{2} (2.06 sq mi)
- Elevation: 523 m (1,716 ft)

Population (December 2005)
  - Total: 405
  - Density: 76.0/km^{2} (197/sq mi)
- Time zone: UTC+01:00 (CET)
  - Summer (DST): UTC+02:00 (CEST)
- Postal code: 2843
- SFOS number: 6704
- ISO 3166 code: CH-JU
- Surrounded by: Haute-Sorne, Courtételle, Rossemaison, Courrendlin, Roches (BE), Moutier
- Website: www.chatillon.ch

Châtillon (French pronunciation: [ʃatijɔ̃]) is a municipality in the district of Delémont in the canton of Jura in Switzerland.

== History ==
Châtillon was first mentioned in 1148 as Chastellun.

== Geography ==
Châtillon has an area of 5.31 km^{2} (2.05 sq mi). Of this area, 2.24 km^{2} (0.86 mi^{2}) or 42.2% is used for agricultural purposes, while 2.72 km^{2} (1.05 mi^{2}) or 51.2% is forested. Of the rest of the land, 0.28 km^{2} (0.11 mi^{2}) or 5.3% is settled (buildings or roads) and 0.01 km^{2} (2.5 acres) or 0.2% is either rivers or lakes.

Of the settled area, housing and buildings made up 3.2% and transportation infrastructure make up 1.7%. Out of the forested land, 48.6% of the total land area is heavily forested and 2.6% is covered with orchards or small clusters of trees. Of the agricultural land, 19.4% is used for growing crops and 14.9% is pastures, while 1.1% is used for orchards or vine crops and 6.8% is used for alpine pastures. All the water in the municipality is flowing water.

The municipality is located in the Delemont district, south of Delemont in a valley on the northern slope of the Le Mont mountain chain. It consists of the linear village of Châtillon.

== Coat of arms ==
The blazon of the municipal coat of arms is Argent, issuant from a Base Vert a Castle Sable of two stories embattled, with two towers and in sinister a Pine tree of the second.

== Demographics ==
Châtillon has a population (as of December 2020) of 485. As of 2008, 4.7% of the population are resident foreign nationals. Over the last 10 years (2000–2010) the population has changed at a rate of 13.7%. Migration accounted for 8.4%, while births and deaths accounted for 5.3%.

Most of the population (as of 2000) speaks French (364 or 96.3%) as their first language, German is the second most common (10 or 2.6%) and Italian is the third (2 or 0.5%).

As of 2008, the population was 49.7% male and 50.3% female. The population was made up of 198 Swiss men (45.9% of the population) and 16 (3.7%) non-Swiss men. There were 211 Swiss women (49.0%) and 6 (1.4%) non-Swiss women. Of the population in the municipality, 161 or about 42.6% were born in Châtillon and lived there in 2000. There were 133 or 35.2% who were born in the same canton, while 55 or 14.6% were born somewhere else in Switzerland, and 22 or 5.8% were born outside of Switzerland.

As of 2000, children and teenagers (0–19 years old) make up 34.1% of the population, while adults (20–64 years old) make up 50.8% and seniors (over 64 years old) make up 15.1%.

As of 2000, there were 167 people who were single and never married in the municipality. There were 182 married individuals, 18 widows or widowers and 11 individuals who are divorced.

As of 2000, there were 129 private households in the municipality, and an average of 2.9 persons per household. There were 27 households that consist of only one person and 24 households with five or more people. In 2000, a total of 125 apartments (94.0% of the total) were permanently occupied, while 6 apartments (4.5%) were seasonally occupied and 2 apartments (1.5%) were empty. As of 2009, the construction rate of new housing units was 2.3 new units per 1000 residents.

The historical population is given in the following chart:

== Politics ==
In the 2007 federal election the most popular party was the SPS which received 49.06% of the vote. The next three most popular parties were the CVP (32.21%), the FDP (7.12%) and the SVP (5.99%). In the federal election, a total of 137 votes were cast, and the voter turnout was 45.1%.

== Economy ==
As of 2010, Châtillon had an unemployment rate of 4%. As of 2008, there were 33 people employed in the primary economic sector and about 12 businesses involved in this sector. 7 people were employed in the secondary sector and there were 3 businesses in this sector. 19 people were employed in the tertiary sector, with 5 businesses in this sector. There were 155 residents of the municipality who were employed in some capacity, of which females made up 37.4% of the workforce.

In 2008 the total number of full-time equivalent jobs was 41. The number of jobs in the primary sector was 23, of which 19 were in agriculture and 4 were in forestry or lumber production. The number of jobs in the secondary sector was 7 of which 3 or (42.9%) were in manufacturing and 4 (57.1%) were in construction. The number of jobs in the tertiary sector was 11. In the tertiary sector; 2 or 18.2% were in wholesale or retail sales or the repair of motor vehicles, 1 was a technical professional or scientist, 6 or 54.5% were in education and 1 was in health care.

In 2000, there were 15 workers who commuted into the municipality and 120 workers who commuted away. The municipality is a net exporter of workers, with about 8.0 workers leaving the municipality for every one entering. Of the working population, 11% used public transportation to get to work, and 67.1% used a private car.

== Religion ==
From the 2000 census, 304 or 80.4% were Roman Catholic, while 28 or 7.4% belonged to the Swiss Reformed Church. Of the rest of the population, there were 32 individuals (or about 8.47% of the population) who belonged to another Christian church. 25 (or about 6.61% of the population) belonged to no church, are agnostic or atheist, and 5 individuals (or about 1.32% of the population) did not answer the question.

== Education ==
In Châtillon about 138 or (36.5%) of the population have completed non-mandatory upper secondary education, and 26 or (6.9%) have completed additional higher education (either university or a Fachhochschule). Of the 26 who completed tertiary schooling, 69.2% were Swiss men, 19.2% were Swiss women.

The Canton of Jura school system provides two year of non-obligatory Kindergarten, followed by six years of Primary school. This is followed by three years of obligatory lower Secondary school, where the students are separated according to ability and aptitude. Following the lower Secondary, students may attend a three or four year optional upper Secondary school followed by some form of Tertiary school, or they may enter an apprenticeship.

During the 2009-10 school year, there were no students attending school in Châtillon. As of 2000, there were 8 students in Châtillon who came from another municipality, while 44 residents attended schools outside the municipality.
