= Rebeuvelier =

- Former municipality
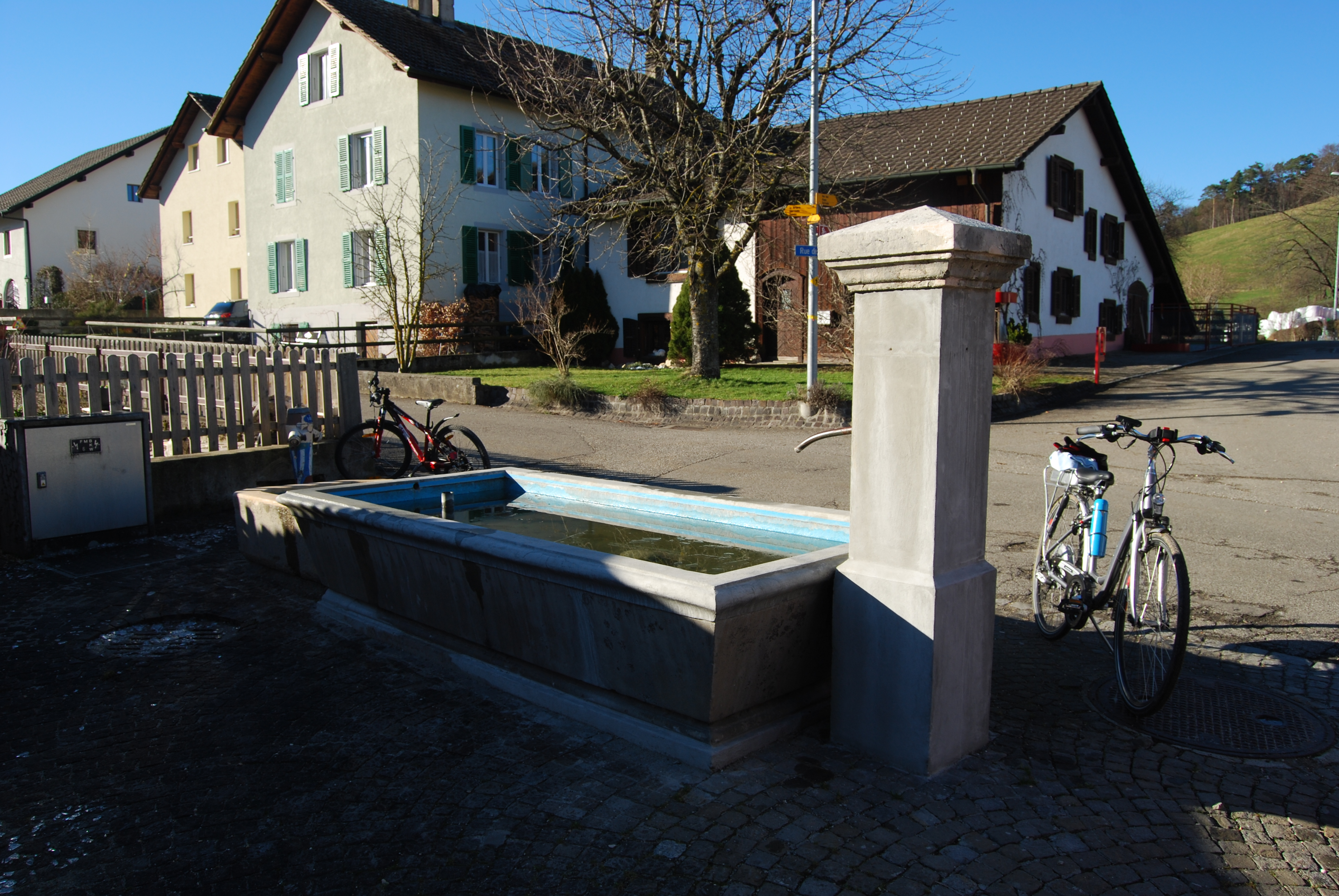
- Fountain in Rebeuvelier village

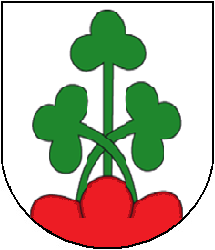
- Coat of arms
- Location of Rebeuvelier
- Location within Switzerland Location within Canton of Jura
- Coordinates: 47°20′N 07°25′E
- Country: Switzerland
- Canton: Jura
- District: Delémont

Government
  - Mayor: Maire

Area
  - Total: 8.42 km^{2} (3.25 sq mi)
- Elevation: 664 m (2,178 ft)

Population (2003)
  - Total: 379
  - Density: 45.0/km^{2} (117/sq mi)
- Time zone: UTC+01:00 (CET)
  - Summer (DST): UTC+02:00 (CEST)
- Postal code: 2832
- SFOS number: 6720
- ISO 3166 code: CH-JU
- Surrounded by: Courrendlin, Courroux, Vicques, Vermes, Grandval (BE), Roches (BE)
- Website: SFSO statistics

Rebeuvelier (French pronunciation: [ʁəbœvəlje]) is a former municipality in the district of Delémont in the canton of Jura in Switzerland. On 1 January 2019 the former municipalities of Rebeuvelier and Vellerat merged into the municipality of Courrendlin.

== History ==
Rebeuvelier is first mentioned in 1148 as Rebonvillier. The municipality was formerly known by its German name Rippertswiler, however, that name is no longer used.

== Geography ==
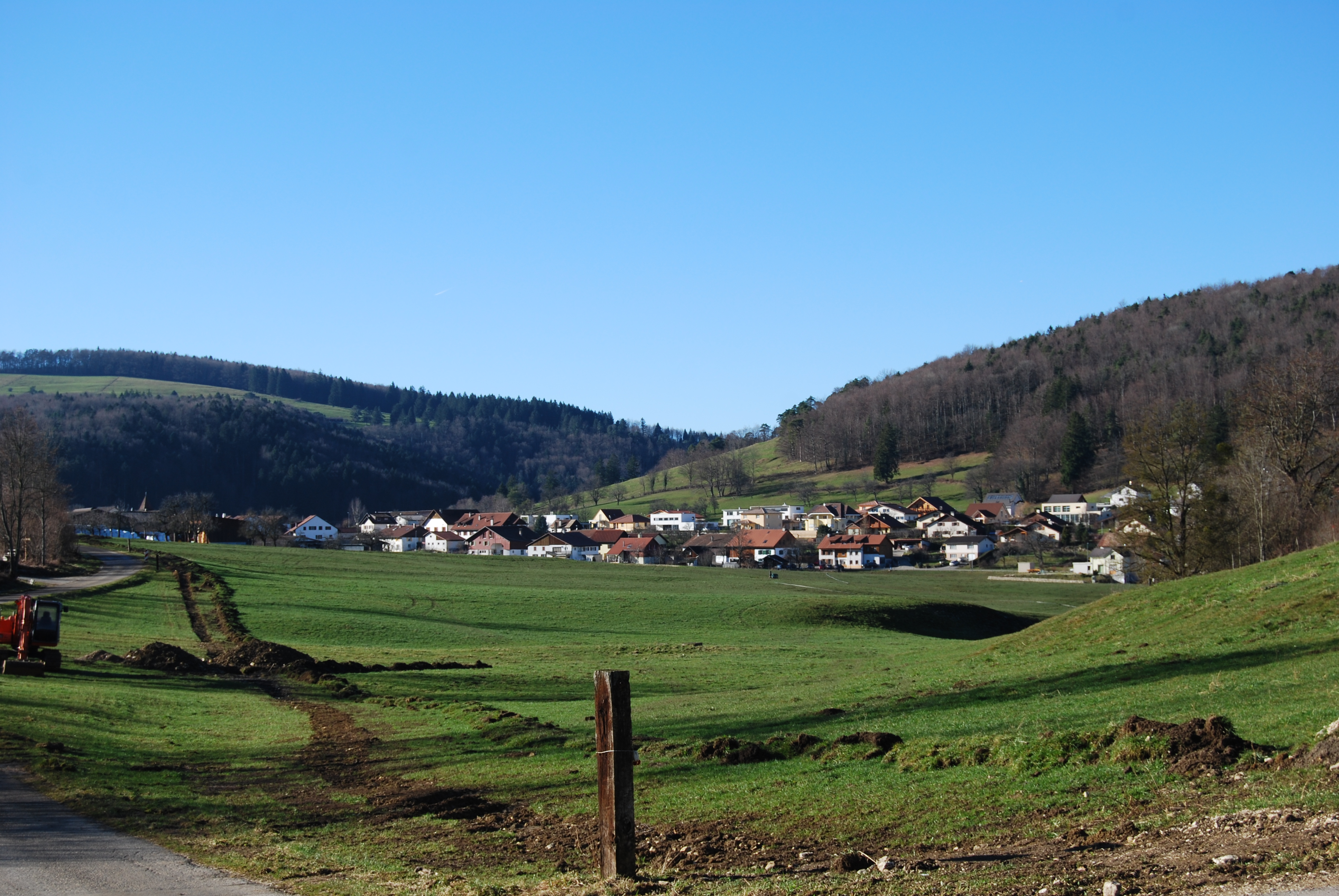
Rebeuvelier

Rebeuvelier has an area of 8.41 km^{2} (3.25 sq mi). Of this area, 4.04 km^{2} (1.56 mi^{2}) or 48.0% is used for agricultural purposes, while 4.13 km^{2} (1.59 mi^{2}) or 49.1% is forested. Of the rest of the land, 0.26 km^{2} (0.10 mi^{2}) or 3.1% is settled (buildings or roads).

Of the built up area, housing and buildings made up 2.0% and transportation infrastructure made up 0.5%. Out of the forested land, 46.0% of the total land area is heavily forested and 3.1% is covered with orchards or small clusters of trees. Of the agricultural land, 11.1% is used for growing crops and 18.3% is pastures and 18.5% is used for alpine pastures.

The municipality is located in the Delemont district, east of the Delémont-Moutier road. The municipal area includes the highest point in the Canton of Jura, the peak of Mont Raimeux (1,303 m [4,275 ft]).

== Coat of arms ==
The blazon of the municipal coat of arms is Argent, issuant from Coupeaux Gules three trefoils, outer two in saltire.

== Demographics ==
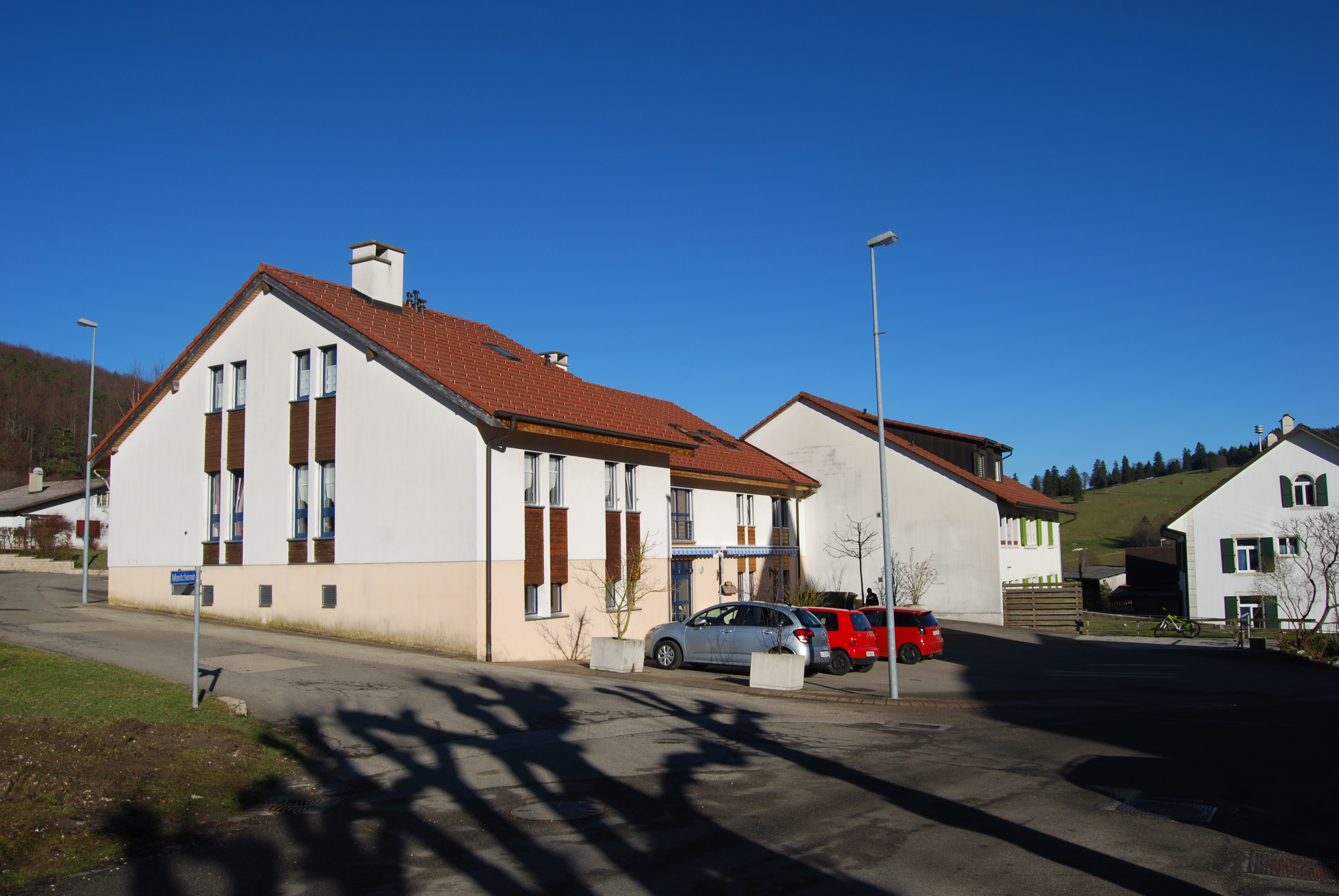
Houses in Rebeuvelier

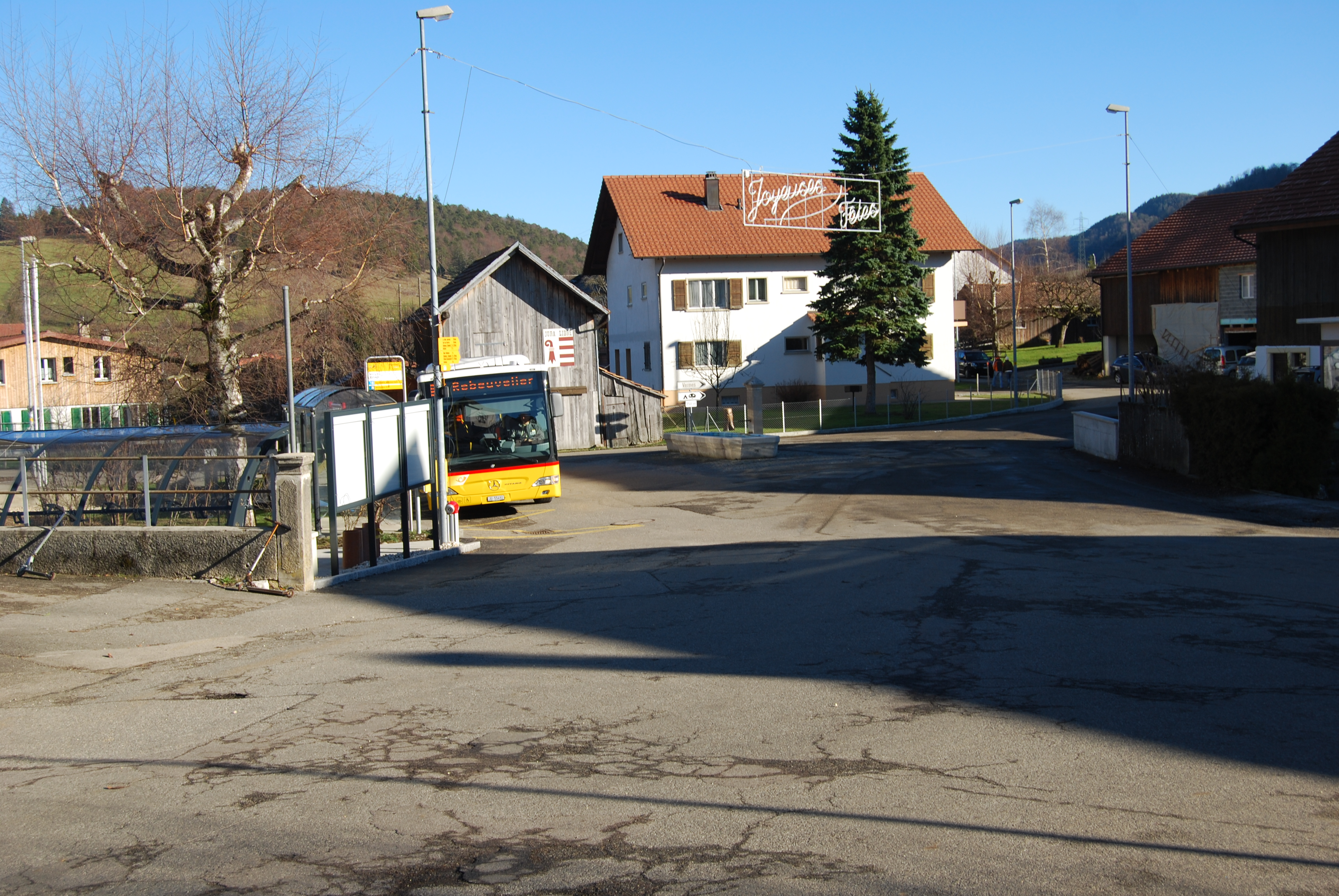
Postauto bus in Rebeuvelier

Rebeuvelier has a population (as of December 2020) of 384. As of 2008, 1.6% of the population are resident foreign nationals. Over the last 10 years (2000–2010) the population has changed at a rate of 15%. Migration accounted for 3.3%, while births and deaths accounted for 7.2%.

Most of the population (as of 2000) speaks French (294 or 93.6%) as their first language, German is the second most common (16 or 5.1%) and Italian is the third (2 or 0.6%).

As of 2008, the population was 52.7% male and 47.3% female. The population was made up of 197 Swiss men (51.4% of the population) and 5 (1.3%) non-Swiss men. There were 179 Swiss women (46.7%) and 2 (0.5%) non-Swiss women. Of the population in the municipality, 121 or about 38.5% were born in Rebeuvelier and lived there in 2000. There were 106 or 33.8% who were born in the same canton, while 60 or 19.1% were born somewhere else in Switzerland, and 18 or 5.7% were born outside of Switzerland.

As of 2000, children and teenagers (0–19 years old) make up 28.7% of the population, while adults (20–64 years old) make up 59.9% and seniors (over 64 years old) make up 11.5%.

As of 2000, there were 133 people who were single and never married in the municipality. There were 165 married individuals, 10 widows or widowers and 6 individuals who are divorced.

As of 2000, there were 112 private households in the municipality, and an average of 2.7 persons per household. There were 23 households that consist of only one person and 13 households with five or more people. In 2000, a total of 107 apartments (83.6% of the total) were permanently occupied, while 16 apartments (12.5%) were seasonally occupied and 5 apartments (3.9%) were empty. As of 2009, the construction rate of new housing units was 2.6 new units per 1000 residents.

The historical population is given in the following chart:

== Politics ==
In the 2007 federal election the most popular party was the SPS which received 49.55% of the vote. The next three most popular parties were the SVP (18.75%), the CVP (14.73%) and the CSP (11.16%). In the federal election, a total of 112 votes were cast, and the voter turnout was 41.3%.

== Economy ==
As of 2010, Rebeuvelier had an unemployment rate of 5.5%. As of 2008, there were 24 people employed in the primary economic sector and about 7 businesses involved in this sector. 44 people were employed in the secondary sector and there were 5 businesses in this sector. 36 people were employed in the tertiary sector, with 9 businesses in this sector. There were 161 residents of the municipality who were employed in some capacity, of which females made up 41.6% of the workforce.

In 2008 the total number of full-time equivalent jobs was 82. The number of jobs in the primary sector was 16, all of which were in agriculture. The number of jobs in the secondary sector was 40 of which 28 or (70.0%) were in manufacturing and 12 (30.0%) were in construction. The number of jobs in the tertiary sector was 26. In the tertiary sector; 1 was in the sale or repair of motor vehicles, 2 or 7.7% were in the movement and storage of goods, 11 or 42.3% were in a hotel or restaurant, 8 or 30.8% were technical professionals or scientists, 5 or 19.2% were in education.

In 2000, there were 23 workers who commuted into the municipality and 117 workers who commuted away. The municipality is a net exporter of workers, with about 5.1 workers leaving the municipality for every one entering. Of the working population, 5.6% used public transportation to get to work, and 72% used a private car.

== Religion ==
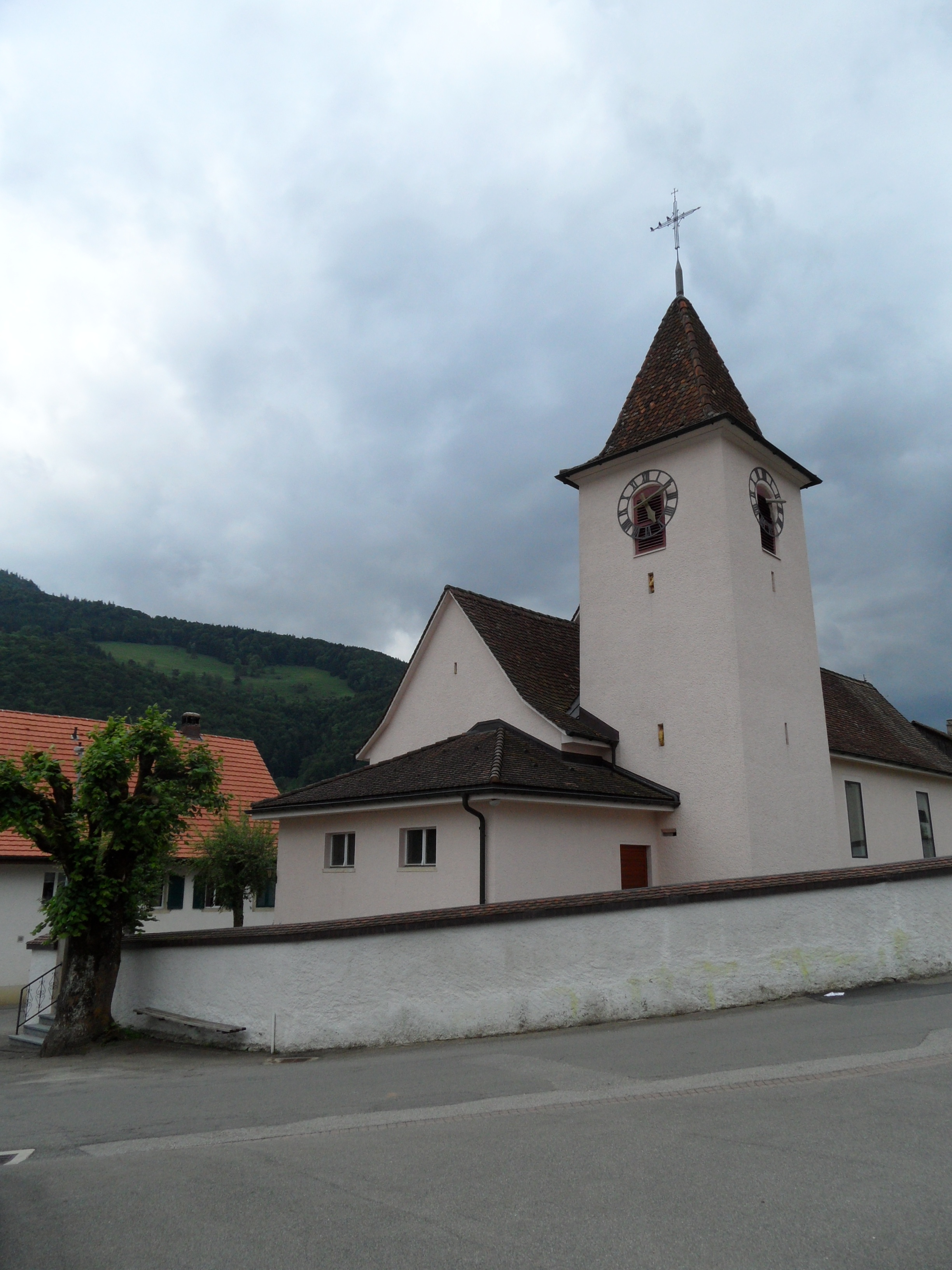
Rebeuvelier village church

From the 2000 census, 217 or 69.1% were Roman Catholic, while 54 or 17.2% belonged to the Swiss Reformed Church. Of the rest of the population, there were 3 members of an Orthodox church (or about 0.96% of the population), and there were 18 individuals (or about 5.73% of the population) who belonged to another Christian church. There was 1 individual who was Islamic. 27 (or about 8.60% of the population) belonged to no church, are agnostic or atheist, and 3 individuals (or about 0.96% of the population) did not answer the question.

== Education ==
In Rebeuvelier about 132 or (42.0%) of the population have completed non-mandatory upper secondary education, and 21 or (6.7%) have completed additional higher education (either university or a Fachhochschule). Of the 21 who completed tertiary schooling, 71.4% were Swiss men, 23.8% were Swiss women.

The Canton of Jura school system provides two year of non-obligatory Kindergarten, followed by six years of Primary school. This is followed by three years of obligatory lower Secondary school where the students are separated according to ability and aptitude. Following the lower Secondary students may attend a three or four year optional upper Secondary school followed by some form of Tertiary school or they may enter an apprenticeship.

During the 2009-10 school year, there were a total of 41 students attending 4 classes in Rebeuvelier. There was one kindergarten class with a total of 13 students in the municipality. The municipality had 2.5 primary classes and 28 students. There are only nine Secondary schools in the canton, so all the students from Rebeuvelier attend their secondary school in another municipality.

As of 2000, there were 24 students from Rebeuvelier who attended schools outside the municipality.
