= Delémont =

- Municipality
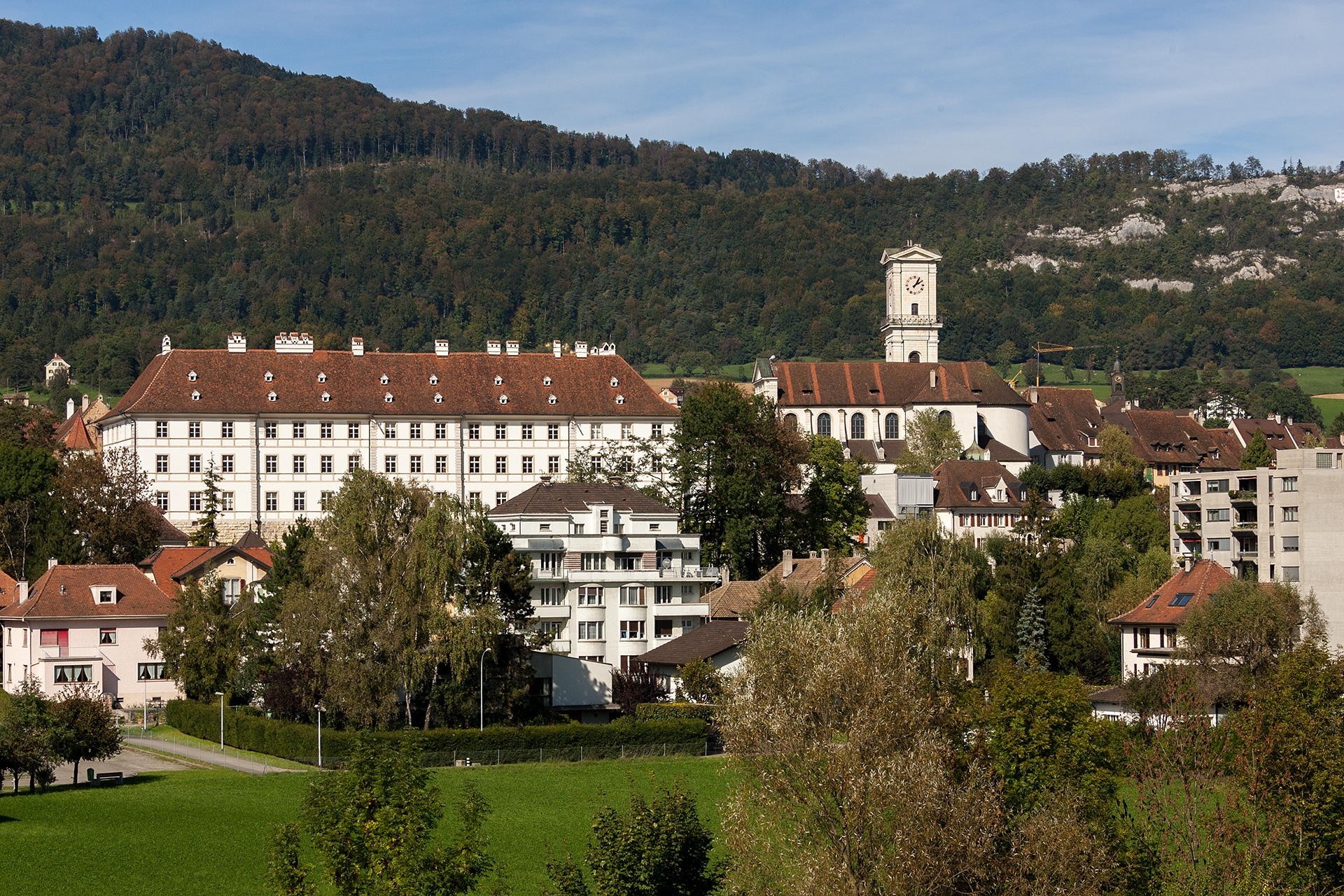
- Delémont Castle (left) and Saint-Marcel Church

- Flag Coat of arms
- Location of Delémont
- Location within Switzerland Location within Canton of Jura
- Coordinates: 47°22′N 7°21′E
- Country: Switzerland
- Canton: Jura
- District: Delémont

Government
  - Executive: Conseil communal with 6 (Note: The Chancellor is also considered to be part of the Conseil communal.) members
  - Mayor: Maire (list); Damien Chappuis PCSI (as of 2026)
  - Parliament: Conseil de Ville with 41 members

Area
  - Total: 22.03 km^{2} (8.51 sq mi)
- Elevation: 435 m (1,427 ft)

Population (December 2007)
  - Total: 11,364
  - Density: 515.8/km^{2} (1,336/sq mi)
- Time zone: UTC+01:00 (CET)
  - Summer (DST): UTC+02:00 (CEST)
- Postal code: 2800
- SFOS number: 6711
- ISO 3166 code: CH-JU
- Surrounded by: Develier, Courtételle, Rossemaison, Courrendlin, Courroux, Soyhières, Mettembert, Bourrignon
- Twin towns: Belfort (France)
- Website: www.delemont.ch

Delémont (French pronunciation: [dəlemɔ̃]; Franc-Comtois: D'lémont; German: Delsberg, [ˈdeːlsˌbɛʁk]) is a municipality, a town and the capital of the Swiss canton of Jura. The town has approximately 12,000 inhabitants as of 2013.

== History ==
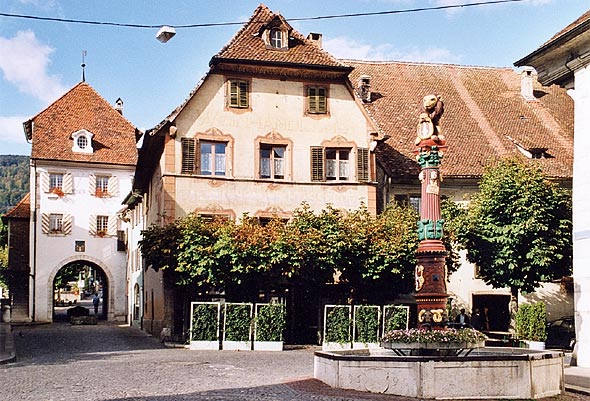
Porte au Loup

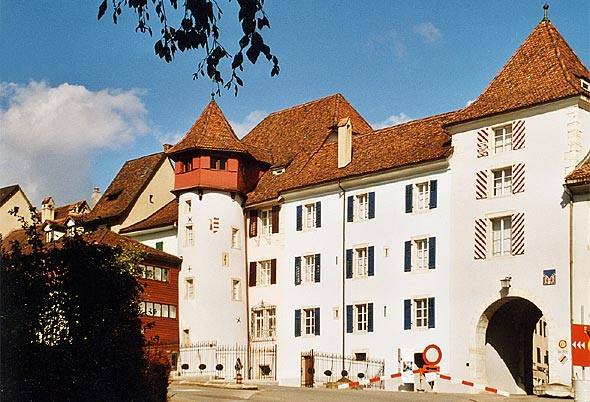
Porte de Porrentruy

Aerial view by Walter Mittelholzer (1919)

The area of the municipality was already settled in the middle Bronze Age. Fifteen urn burials have been discovered in the municipality. There were late Bronze Age settlements south and west of the modern city. Several Iron Age buildings have been discovered south of town. There is also evidence of a Roman settlement, including a Gallo-Roman mausoleum and a small cache of coins. One or possibly several villas in the area may indicate the existence of a vicus near the town.

The first historic mention of the name dates from 736 to 37 as Delemonte. In 1131, the first mention of the German name Telsperg was recorded. It is also mentioned as Laimunt (1181) and Deleymunt (1225). The name is a combination of the Germanic Tello or Dagili with the Latin word mons for mountain.

Since the 7th century, the region belonged to the lands of the counts of Alsace. In 1271, it was sold to the Bishop of Basel. At this time it consisted of a fortified village and two castles, which were probably the homes of the Telsberg family. The city was declared to have municipal rights by Bishop Peter Reich von Reichenstein on 6 January 1289. This charter allowed the city some self-governance and allowed it to distribute land, which created favorable conditions for the growth of the town. In 1338 they received the right to collect a tax on wine and food and in 1461 they were allowed to sell and tax salt in the valleys of Delémont and Moutier. From this income, as well as the money from a brick factory, two mills and eight farms, which were in use between the 15th and 17th centuries the city was able to meet all of its financial obligations. From 1289 to 1793, it was the capital of the estate of Delémont.

The old town was nearly square, with two large longitudinal streets that are intersected by three cross streets. The city was surrounded by city walls, which were strengthened in the southwest, near the Bishop's Castle, during the 14th century. In the north-east corner a large round tower was built in the 13th century. There were four gates into the city: Porte Monsieur (or de Porrentruy), the Porte au Loup, the Porte des Moulins and the Porte des Près (or de Bâle). The latter was bricked up in 1487, when a fire destroyed a large part of the city. One characteristic of Delémont are the monumental fountains in the late Renaissance style. The most important public buildings were rebuilt in the 18th century. The Bishop's Castle, which served as a summer residence, was rebuilt in 1716-21 by Pierre Racine from Tramelan. The Châtelain's building was rebuilt in 1717, followed in 1742-45 the town hall by Johann Caspar Bagnato and in 1753 the private residence of the family of Rinck Baldenstein, the county's administrator. The church of Saint-Marcel was built 1762-67 from plans by Pierre-Francois Paris, and replaced a Gothic style building which stood on the same location. The steeple was completed in 1850–51.

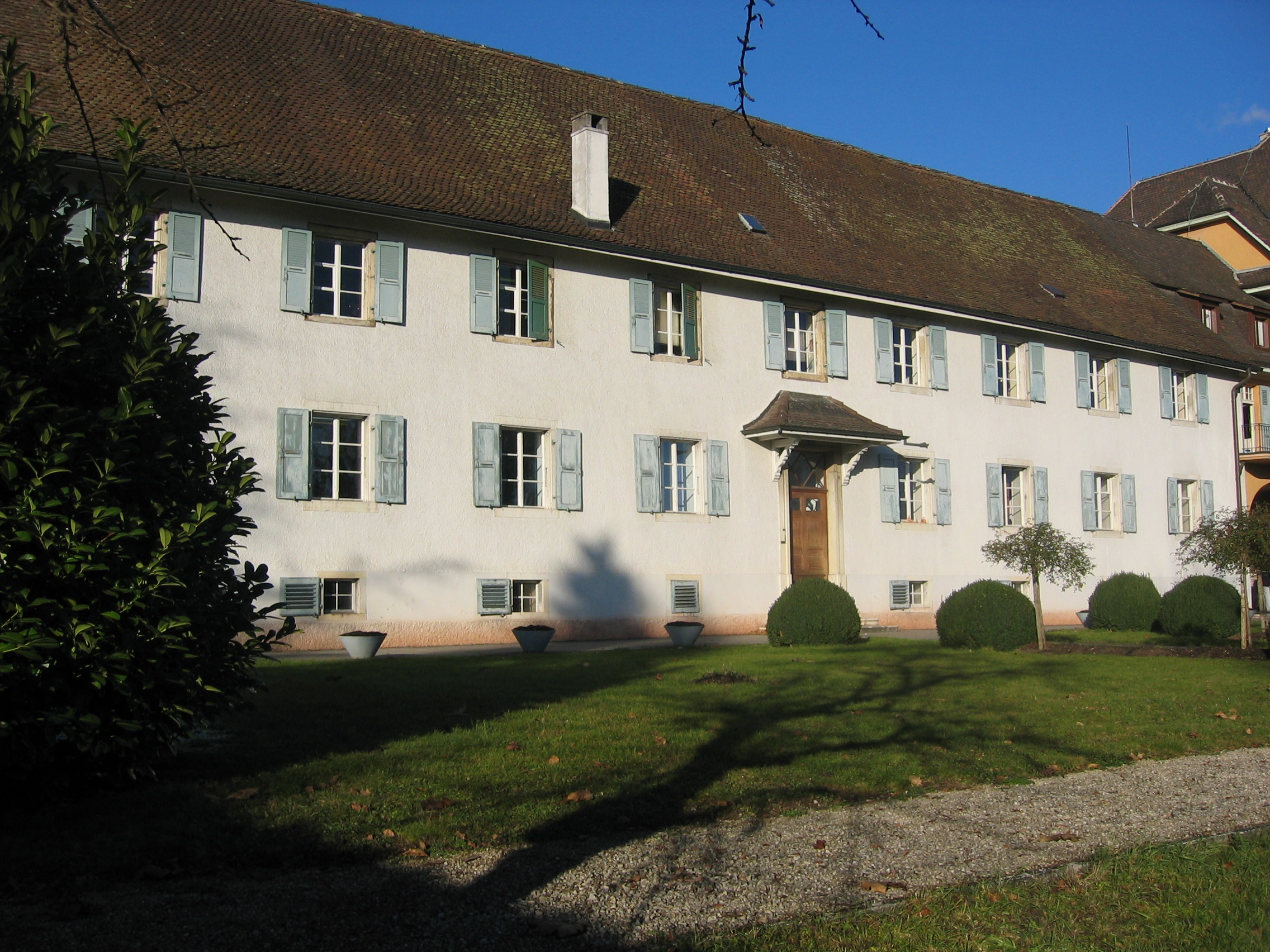
Old Capucin convent

The town's parish was first mentioned in 1255. The parish was administered by either a priest or a rector and seven or four (after 1760) chaplains. The rector of the Church of Saint-Marcel was also the dean of the rural diaconate of Salignon in the diocese of Basel. Between 1534 and 1792 the parish church served as the collegiate church for the collegiate chapter of Moutier-Grandval, who had fled to Delémont during the Protestant Reformation.

During the Counter-Reformation a monastery of the Order of Friars Minor Capuchin and an Ursuline convent were established, which remained until 1793. The Ursulines were established in 1698 to provide an education for young girls, which they did for almost a century.

The chapel of Saint-Imier, the former chapel of Telsberg castle, was rebuilt in 1586 and dedicated to Mary. During the increase in popularity of the Marian cult in the 17th century, the chapel was expanded and rebuilt several times. After the coronation of the statue of Notre-Dame in 1869 the chapel became the most popular pilgrimage place in the Catholic Jura.

In 1793, Delémont was conquered by French Revolutionary troops and became the seat of one of the districts of the Département du Mont Terrible. In 1800, this was incorporated into the Département du Haut-Rhin. After the fall of Napoleon, the region was given to the Canton of Bern in 1815. Under the French, the old power structure in the city was suppressed. The Bürgergemeinde (an association of all full citizens) no longer had authority over most of the city lands and the town council became an advisory only organization. After the city came under Bernese authority, the old power structure rushed back into power. The Bürgergemeinde, which owned all the common lands, accepted only a few dozen new members, until 1820 when it closed itself to new members. This unequal power structure remained in place until the liberal revolution in 1831, known as the Regeneration, granted full citizenship rights to all residents of the town. The distribution of the Bürgergemeinde lands dragged on until 1866, when the Canton of Bern finally pushed through an agreement.

During the 19th century industrialization, the German-speaking population increased greatly, and in 1880 reached nearly 40%. The city was briefly bilingual, but since 1920, the German-speaking minority has continuously decreased.

Since 1947, the city became a center for agitation for separation from the Canton of Bern. In the referendums in 1959 and 1974, a large majority voted for the creation of the Canton of Jura. From 1976 to 1978, Delémont was the meeting place for the drafting of the cantonal constitution for the new canton, which was created 1 January 1979, with Delémont as its capital.

== Geography ==
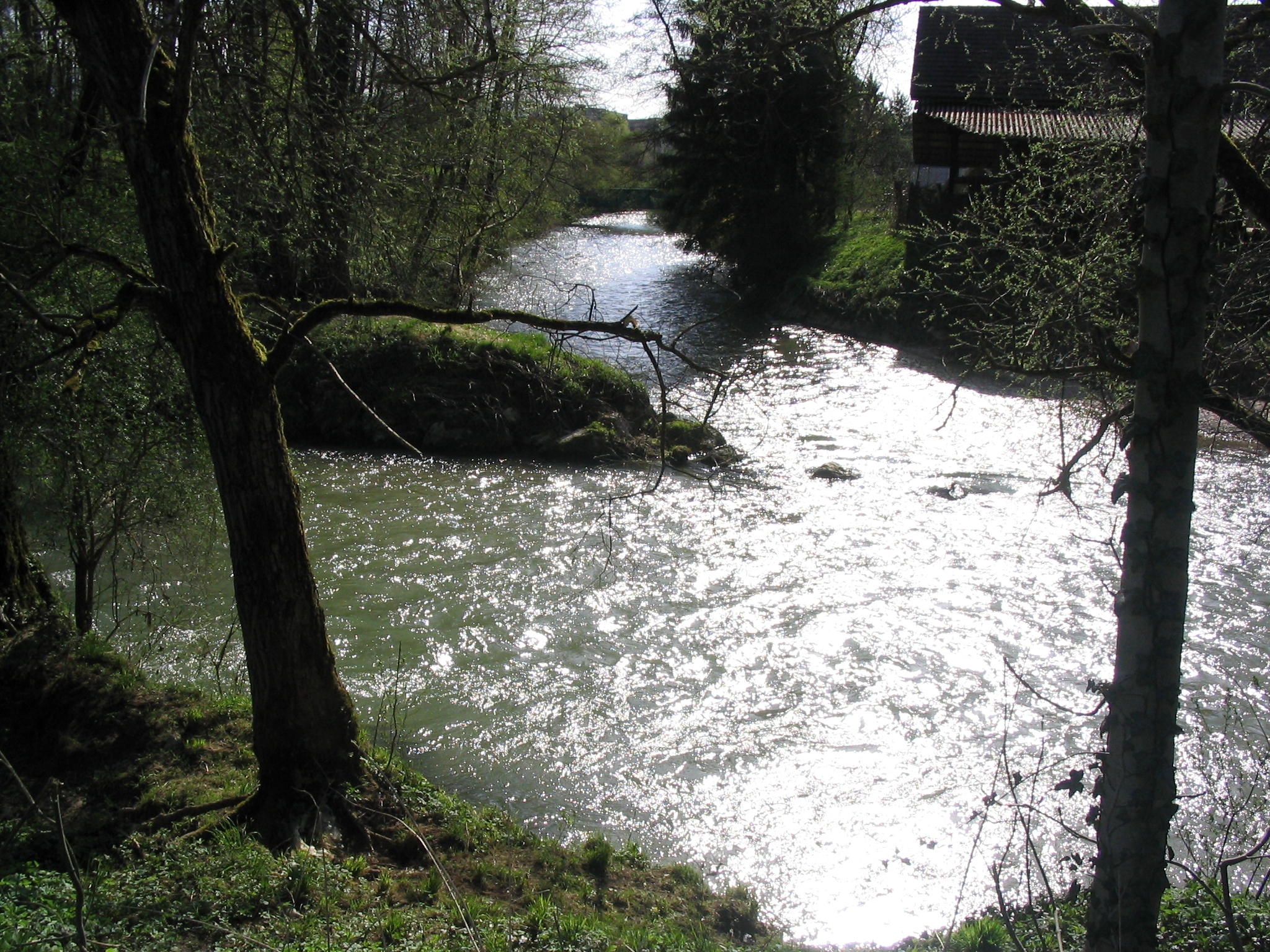
The Birs and the Sorne in Delémont

Delémont has an area of 21.97 km^{2} (8.48 sq mi). Of this area, 8.13 km^{2} (3.14 mi^{2}) or 37.0% is used for agricultural purposes, while 9.24 km^{2} (3.57 mi^{2}) or 42.0% is forested. Of the rest of the land, 4.43 km^{2} (1.71 mi^{2}) or 20.1% is settled (buildings or roads), 0.17 km^{2} (0.066 mi^{2}) or 0.8% is either rivers or lakes and 0.02 km^{2} (4.9 acres) or 0.1% is unproductive land.

Of the built up area, industrial buildings made up 2.8% of the total area while housing and buildings made up 9.8% and transportation infrastructure made up 5.2%. Power and water infrastructure as well as other special developed areas made up 1.2% of the area while parks, green belts and sports fields made up 1.1%. Out of the forested land, 40.2% of the total land area is heavily forested and 1.8% is covered with orchards or small clusters of trees. Of the agricultural land, 17.8% is used for growing crops and 12.2% is pastures and 6.5% is used for alpine pastures. All the water in the municipality is flowing water.

Delémont lies 30 kilometers (18.6 mi) southwest of Basel, about halfway between Basel and Bienne. It stretches along both sides of the Sorne river, shortly before it flows into the Birs on the northern edge of the Delémont valley, a wide depression in the Jura Mountains.

The area of the municipality is largely given to intensive cultivation. At the south end of the valley is the Montchaibeux, an isolated hill. On the north, the valley is bounded by the Les Rangiers range, with la Chaive (930 m (3,050 ft)) as the highest point in the municipality. The eastern boundary is the Birs River.

The towns Les Rondez and Les Vorbourgs are part of the municipality. The surrounding municipalities are Develier, Courtételle, Rossemaison, Courrendlin, Courroux, Soyhières, Mettembert, and Bourrignon.

== Climate ==
Delémont has an oceanic climate (Cfb), according to the Köppen climate classification, bordering a humid continental climate (Dfb). Between 1981 and 2001 Delémont had an average of 134.3 days of rain or snow per year and on average received 908 mm (35.7 in) of precipitation. The wettest month on average is May during which time Delémont received an average of 101 mm (4.0 in) of rain. During this month there was precipitation for an average of 12.9 days. The driest month of the year is February with an average of 52 mm (2.0 in) of precipitation over 9 days.

Climate data for Delémont, elevation 439 m (1,440 ft), (1991–2020)
Month	Jan	Feb	Mar	Apr	May	Jun	Jul	Aug	Sep	Oct	Nov	Dec	Year
Mean daily maximum °C (°F)	4.5 (40.1)	6.7 (44.1)	11.2 (52.2)	15.1 (59.2)	19.0 (66.2)	22.8 (73.0)	24.9 (76.8)	24.6 (76.3)	20.0 (68.0)	15.2 (59.4)	8.8 (47.8)	5.1 (41.2)	14.8 (58.6)
Daily mean °C (°F)	0.9 (33.6)	1.9 (35.4)	5.4 (41.7)	9.1 (48.4)	13.2 (55.8)	16.9 (62.4)	18.7 (65.7)	18.2 (64.8)	14.1 (57.4)	10.0 (50.0)	4.8 (40.6)	1.7 (35.1)	9.6 (49.3)
Mean daily minimum °C (°F)	−2.4 (27.7)	−2.1 (28.2)	0.4 (32.7)	3.2 (37.8)	7.5 (45.5)	11.1 (52.0)	12.6 (54.7)	12.5 (54.5)	9.2 (48.6)	6.0 (42.8)	1.6 (34.9)	−1.5 (29.3)	4.8 (40.6)
Average precipitation mm (inches)	52.5 (2.07)	49.7 (1.96)	52.4 (2.06)	65.4 (2.57)	93.4 (3.68)	91.0 (3.58)	94.2 (3.71)	95.5 (3.76)	71.5 (2.81)	72.9 (2.87)	69.2 (2.72)	68.4 (2.69)	876.1 (34.49)
Average snowfall cm (inches)	7.8 (3.1)	8.7 (3.4)	5.2 (2.0)	0.9 (0.4)	0.0 (0.0)	0.0 (0.0)	0.0 (0.0)	0.0 (0.0)	0.0 (0.0)	0.3 (0.1)	2.3 (0.9)	7.7 (3.0)	32.9 (13.0)
Average precipitation days (≥ 1.0 mm)	10.0	9.3	9.1	9.4	12.4	11.1	10.7	10.4	8.8	10.7	10.4	11.1	123.4
Average snowy days (≥ 1.0 cm)	2.8	2.8	1.3	0.4	0.0	0.0	0.0	0.0	0.0	0.1	0.8	2.5	10.7
Average relative humidity (%)	86	81	75	72	75	74	72	74	79	84	87	87	79
Source 1: NOAA
Source 2: MeteoSwiss

== Coat of arms ==
The blazon of the municipal coat of arms is Gules, a Crosier Argent over Coupeaux of Six of the same.

== Demographics ==
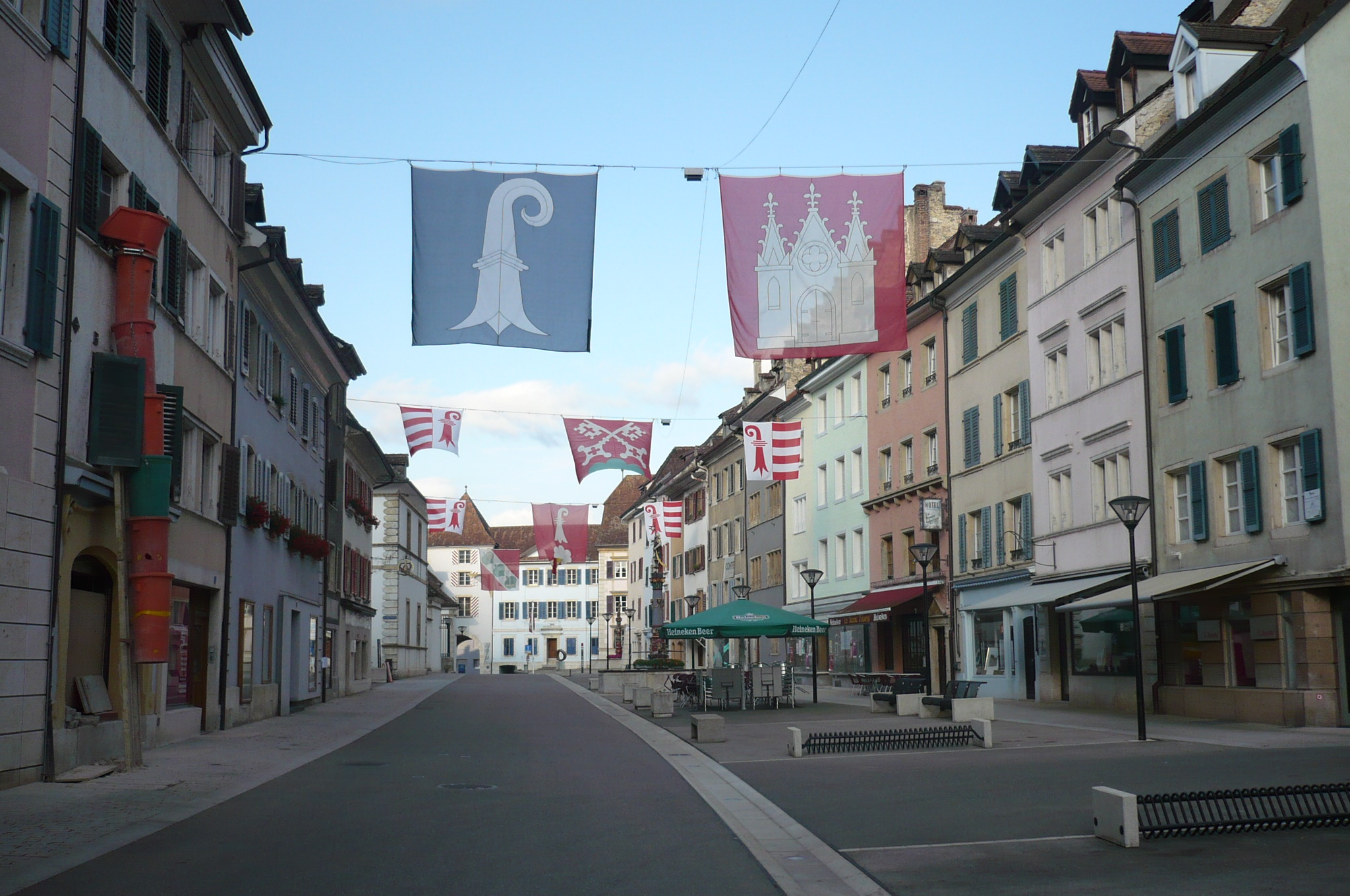
Street in the old city of Delémont

Delémont has a population (as of December 2020) of 12,618. As of 2008, 23.9% of the population are resident foreign nationals. Over the last 10 years (2000–2010) the population has changed at a rate of 1.7%. Migration accounted for 0.5%, while births and deaths accounted for 1.4%.

Most of the population (as of 2000) speaks French (9,574 or 84.3%) as their first language, Italian is the second most common (449 or 4.0%) and German is the third (350 or 3.1%). There are 5 people who speak Romansh.

As of 2008, the population was 48.6% male and 51.4% female. The population was made up of 4,114 Swiss men (35.5% of the population) and 1,512 (13.1%) non-Swiss men. There were 4,669 Swiss women (40.3%) and 1,291 (11.1%) non-Swiss women. Of the population in the municipality, 3,673 or about 32.4% were born in Delémont and lived there in 2000. There were 2,823 or 24.9% who were born in the same canton, while 1,703 or 15.0% were born somewhere else in Switzerland, and 2,720 or 24.0% were born outside of Switzerland.

As of 2000, children and teenagers (0–19 years old) make up 21.9% of the population, while adults (20–64 years old) make up 60.6% and seniors (over 64 years old) make up 17.5%.

As of 2000, there were 4,501 people who were single and never married in the municipality. There were 5,379 married individuals, 832 widows or widowers and 641 individuals who are divorced.

As of 2000, there were 5,039 private households in the municipality, and an average of 2.2 persons per household. There were 1,883 households that consist of only one person and 269 households with five or more people. In 2000, a total of 4,783 apartments (89.0% of the total) were permanently occupied, while 321 apartments (6.0%) were seasonally occupied and 270 apartments (5.0%) were empty. As of 2009, the construction rate of new housing units was 1.6 new units per 1000 residents. The vacancy rate for the municipality, in 2010, was 1.06%.

== Historic population ==
The historical population is given in the following chart:

Historic Population Data
Year	Total population	French speaking	German speaking	Protestant	Catholic	Other	Jewish	Islamic	No religion given	Swiss	Non-Swiss
1850	1,650									1,460	190
1880	2,793	1,754	1,228	714	2,208	4	77			2,657	316
1910	6,161	3,590	2,304	2,182	3,861	8	75			5,284	877
1930	6,393	4,514	1,733	2,383	3,898	9	55			6,032	361
1950	7,504	5,846	1,432	2,350	5,058	13	49			7,114	390
1970	11,797	8,841	1,086	2,468	9,163	472	36			9,431	2,366
1990	11,548	9,442	450	1,688	8,909	1,080	14	178	561	9,112	2,436
2000	11,353	9,574	350	1,440	7,826	980	9	547	917	8,436	2,917

== Government ==
Delémont hosts the parliament and government of the Canton of Jura, but many other governmental functions are housed in Porrentruy, such as the cantonal courts.

== Politics ==
In the 2007 federal election the most popular party was the SPS which received 48.54% of the vote. The next three most popular parties were the CVP (14.95%), the FDP (13.53%) and the SVP (11.96%). In the federal election, a total of 3,090 votes were cast, and the voter turnout was 42.6%.

== Economy ==
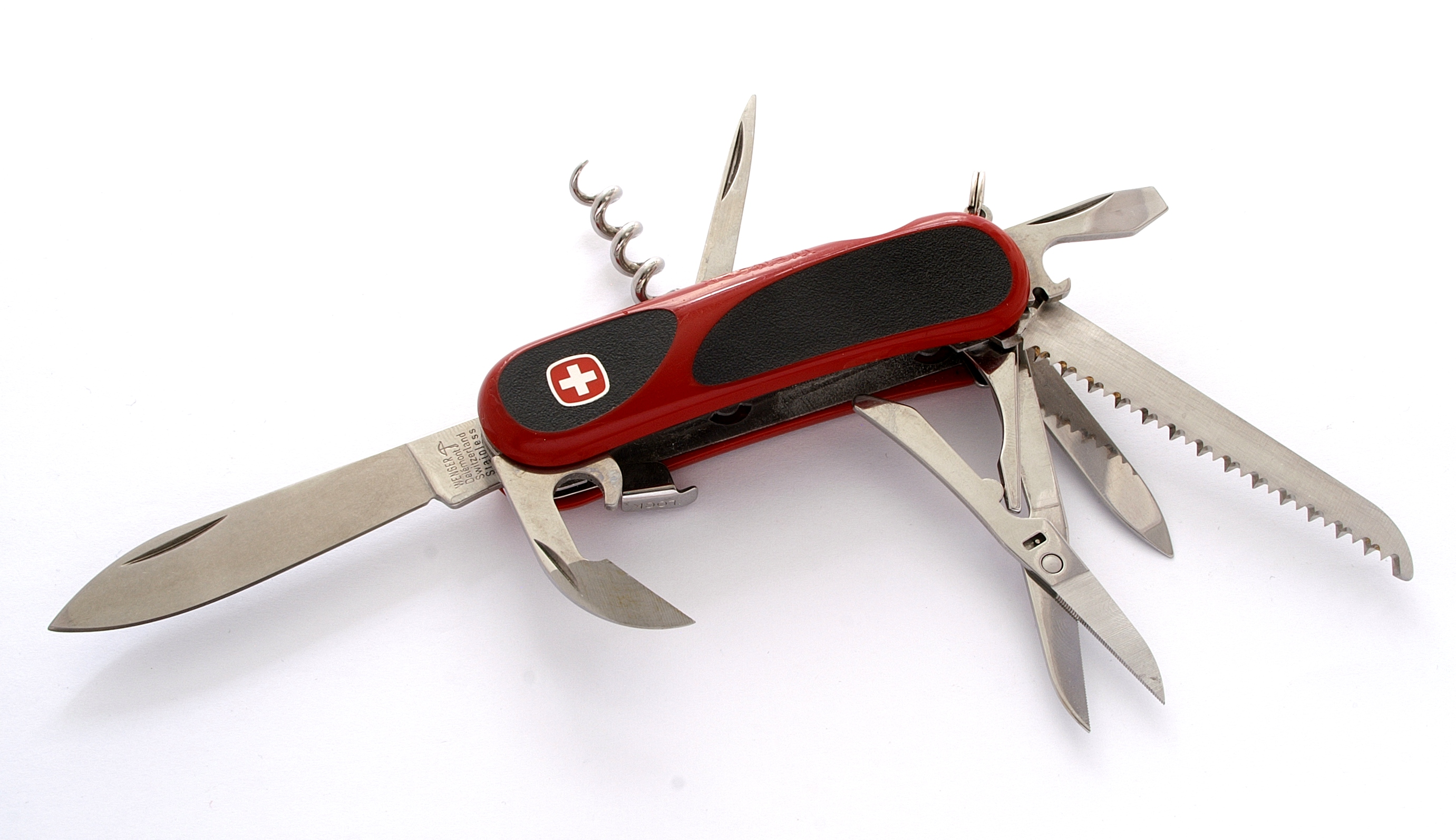
A Wenger Swiss Army knife. The Wenger Swiss army knives are now integrated into Victorinox as the Delémont collection.

By 1770, the city had already begun to develop as a strong trading and manufacturing center. Only about 25% of the population was still engaged in agriculture. In the 19th century, industrialization began, led by steel mills, watchmaking, and machine, cigar, and cement manufacturing.

Perhaps the most well known firm based here is Wenger. Their factory does not have a show room.

Today, Delémont is the economic and governmental hub of the canton, as well as the neighboring Jura region of the Canton of Bern. In addition to its traditional manufacturing core, it has developed much employment in the service sector. Although, it is plagued by a large unemployment rate, forcing its inhabitants to seek for jobs in the larger neighboring cities such as Basel or Biel.

As of 2010, Delémont had an unemployment rate of 7.4%. As of 2008, there were 50 people employed in the primary economic sector and about 19 businesses involved in this sector. 3,094 people were employed in the secondary sector and there were 133 businesses in this sector. 6,946 people were employed in the tertiary sector, with 715 businesses in this sector. There were 5,515 residents of the municipality who were employed in some capacity, of which women made up 44.4% of the workforce.

In 2008 the total number of full-time equivalent jobs was 8,362. The number of jobs in the primary sector was 41, of which 38 were in agriculture and 3 were in forestry or lumber production. The number of jobs in the secondary sector was 2,963 of which 2,236 or (75.5%) were in manufacturing and 607 (20.5%) were in construction. The number of jobs in the tertiary sector was 5,358. In the tertiary sector; 1,165 or 21.7% were in wholesale or retail sales or the repair of motor vehicles, 396 or 7.4% were in the movement and storage of goods, 315 or 5.9% were in a hotel or restaurant, 117 or 2.2% were in the information industry, 374 or 7.0% were the insurance or financial industry, 432 or 8.1% were technical professionals or scientists, 497 or 9.3% were in education and 1,125 or 21.0% were in health care.

In 2000, there were 6,137 workers who commuted into the municipality and 1,711 workers who commuted away. The municipality is a net importer of workers, with about 3.6 workers entering the municipality for every one leaving. About 7.6% of the workforce coming into Delémont are coming from outside Switzerland, while 0.1% of the locals commute out of Switzerland for work. Of the working population, 13.7% used public transportation to get to work, and 55.3% used a private car.

== Religion ==
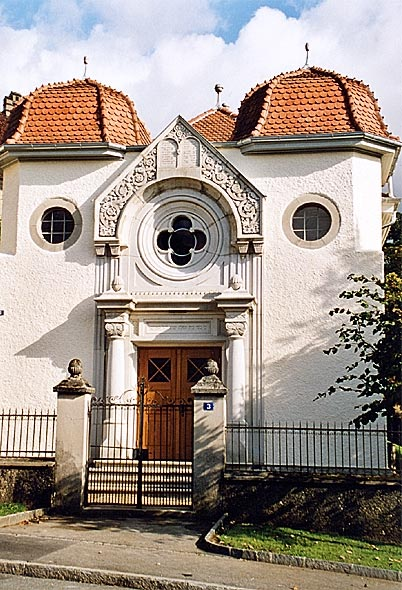
The synagogue of Delémont

From the 2000 census, 7,826 or 68.9% were Roman Catholic, while 1,272 or 11.2% belonged to the Swiss Reformed Church. Of the rest of the population, there were 58 members of an Orthodox church (or about 0.51% of the population), there were 19 individuals (or about 0.17% of the population) who belonged to the Christian Catholic Church, and there were 339 individuals (or about 2.99% of the population) who belonged to another Christian church. There were 9 individuals (or about 0.08% of the population) who were Jewish, and 547 (or about 4.82% of the population) who were Islamic. There were 13 individuals who were Buddhist, 40 individuals who were Hindu and 7 individuals who belonged to another church. 917 (or about 8.08% of the population) belonged to no church, are agnostic or atheist, and 474 individuals (or about 4.18% of the population) did not answer the question.

== Transportation ==
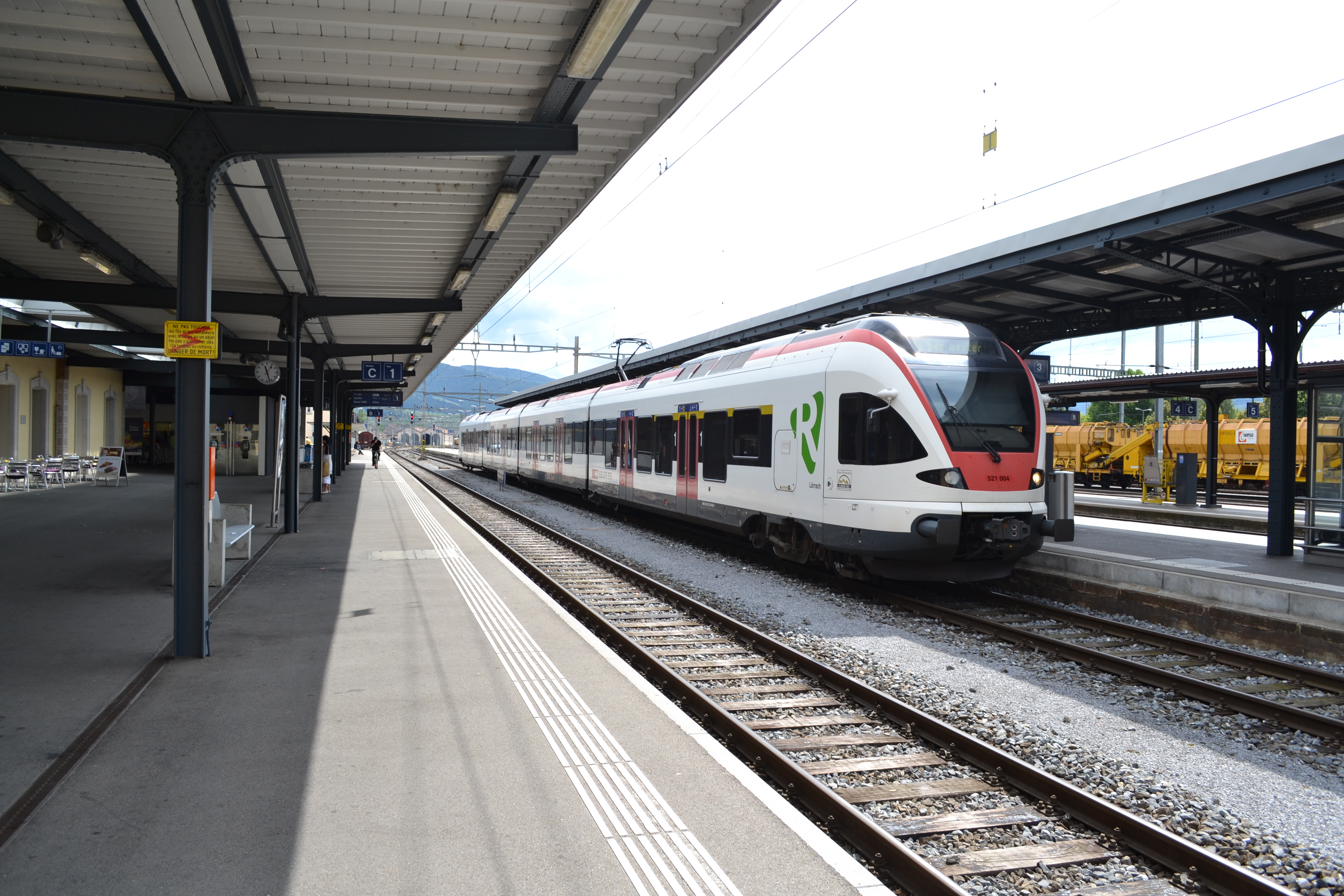
Delémont railway station

At Delémont railway station the railway from Delle, connecting from Paris via Belfort, meets the Bienne to Basel line. The section of line between Belfort and Delle is currently being electrified and an hourly optymo bus service maintains the connection between Delle and Belfort.

Delémont has good road connections to the surrounding cities. It lies on the main road between Basel and Bienne, as well as La Chaux-de-Fonds. In 1998, the first stretch of motorway in the canton of Jura (the A 16) was opened between Delémont and Porrentruy.

The first stretch of rail line reached Delémont from Basel in 1875. The continuation to Moutier was completed in 1876. All trains from Basel to Bienne must reverse in Delémont.

During World War II, the railway station was accidentally bombed on 8 September 1944 by the Allies, injuring a number of railway employees.

A well-developed bus system serves the surrounding countryside.

The nearest airport is EuroAirport Basel Mulhouse Freiburg, located 59 km (37 mi) north east of Delémont. However, Zurich Airport is also at a reasonable distance, located 116 km (72 mi) east of the city.

== Heritage sites of national significance ==
The Vorbourg Chapel, the Prince-Bishops' Castle, St-Marcel's Church, the Museum jurassien d’art et d’histoire and the Tour Rouge, the historic turntable for locomotives and the railway roundhouse are listed as Swiss heritage site of national significance. The entire old town of Delémont is part of the Inventory of Swiss Heritage Sites.

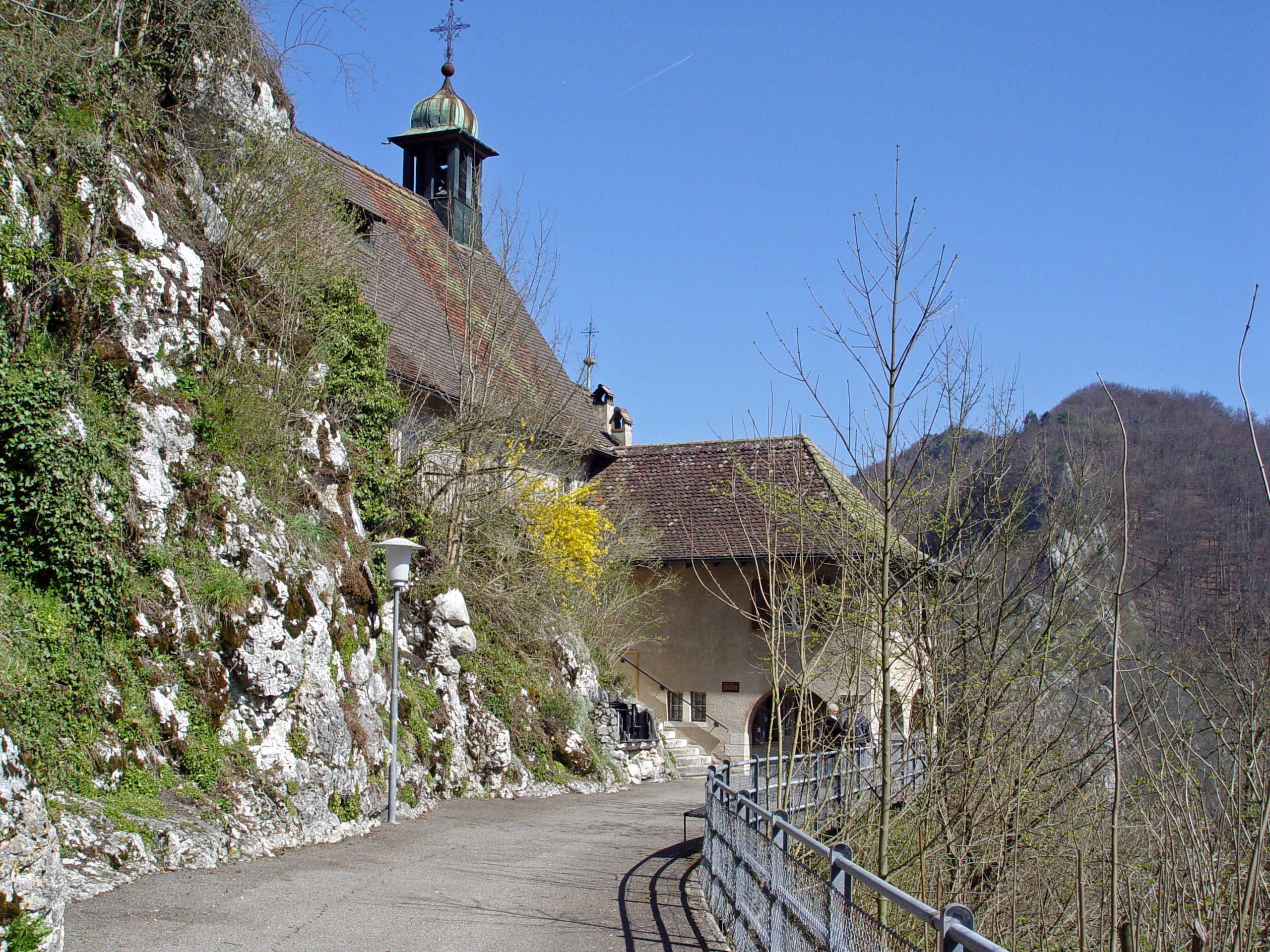
Vorbourg Chapel

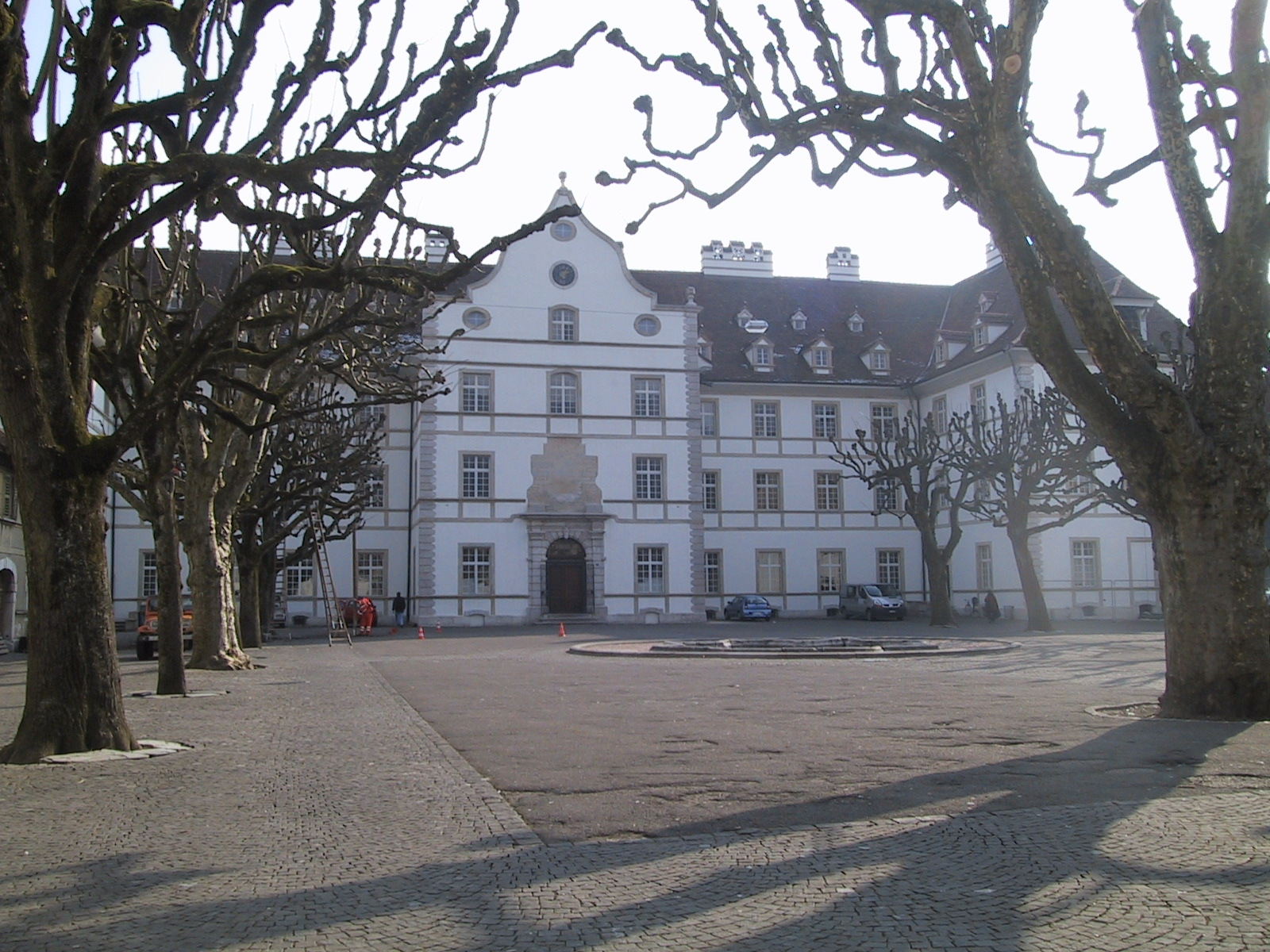
Prince-Bishops' Castle

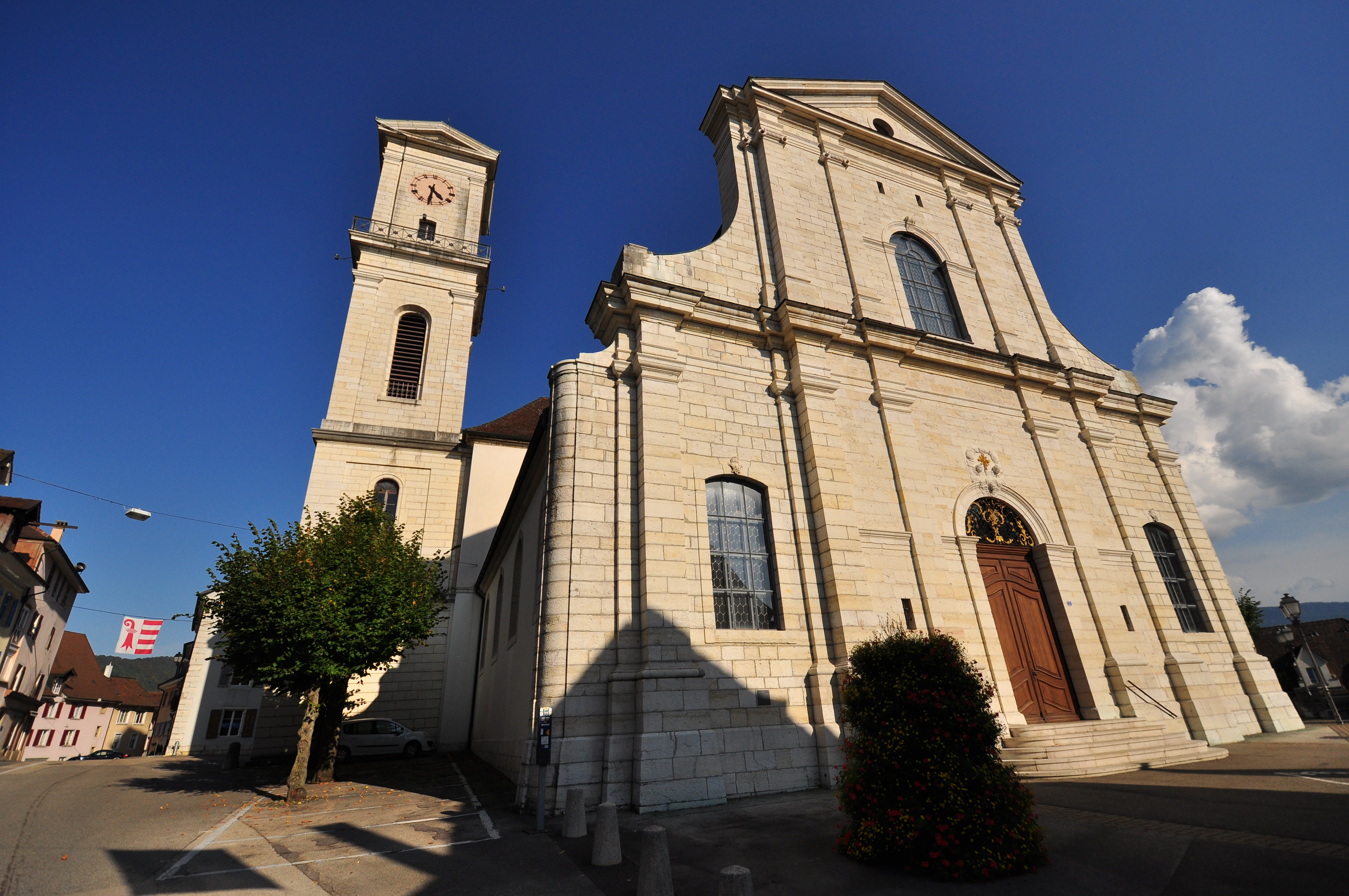
St-Marcel Church

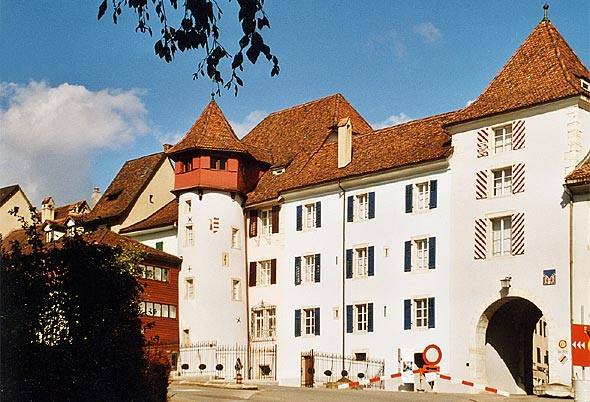
Museum jurassien d’art et d’histoire et Tour Rouge

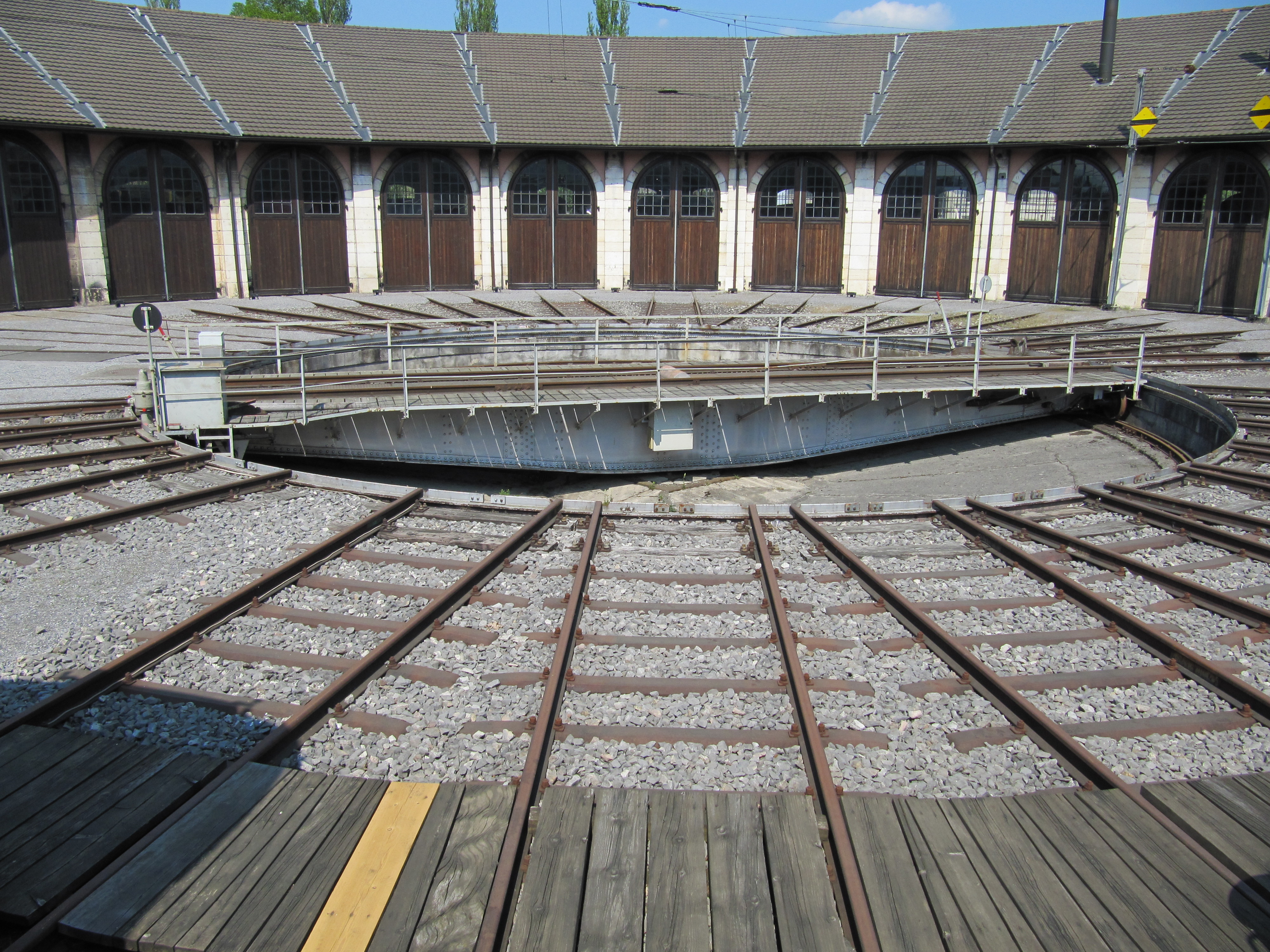
Turntable for locomotives, railway roundhouse

== Tourism ==
The medieval city center still has its original outline. Two of the city gates date from the 18th century: the Porte au Loup (1775) and the Porte de Porrentruy (1756–59). There are also still parts of the city wall, with the Tour des Archives, which was originally built in the 13th century. The city squares are marked by monumental fountains dating from the 16th century, in Renaissance style.

The Catholic church of Saint-Marcel was built from 1762 to 1767 with a mixture of architectural styles from the baroque to the classical. Other important buildings from the time of the Bishops of Basel are the Hôtel de Ville (built from 1742 to 1745), the Châtellenie (now used as the Cantonal Parliament, remodeled in 1717), and the Episcopal Palace (1716–21). The late gothic chapel of Saint-Michel dates from the 17th century.

The synagogue of Delémont is in the western part of the city. The Castle of Domont, built in 1560, is now a restaurant. There are also ruins of an early medieval castle, the Vorbourg, on the west side of the Birs. Next to them stands a chapel, dedicated in 1049 and repeatedly renovated. The main altar with the Madonna dates from the 16th century.

== International relations ==
=== Twin towns – sister cities ===
Delémont is twinned with:

- Belfort, France
- La Trinidad, Nicaragua

== Culture ==
Delémont was awarded the Wakker Prize for preservation of its architectural heritage in 2006.

== Education ==
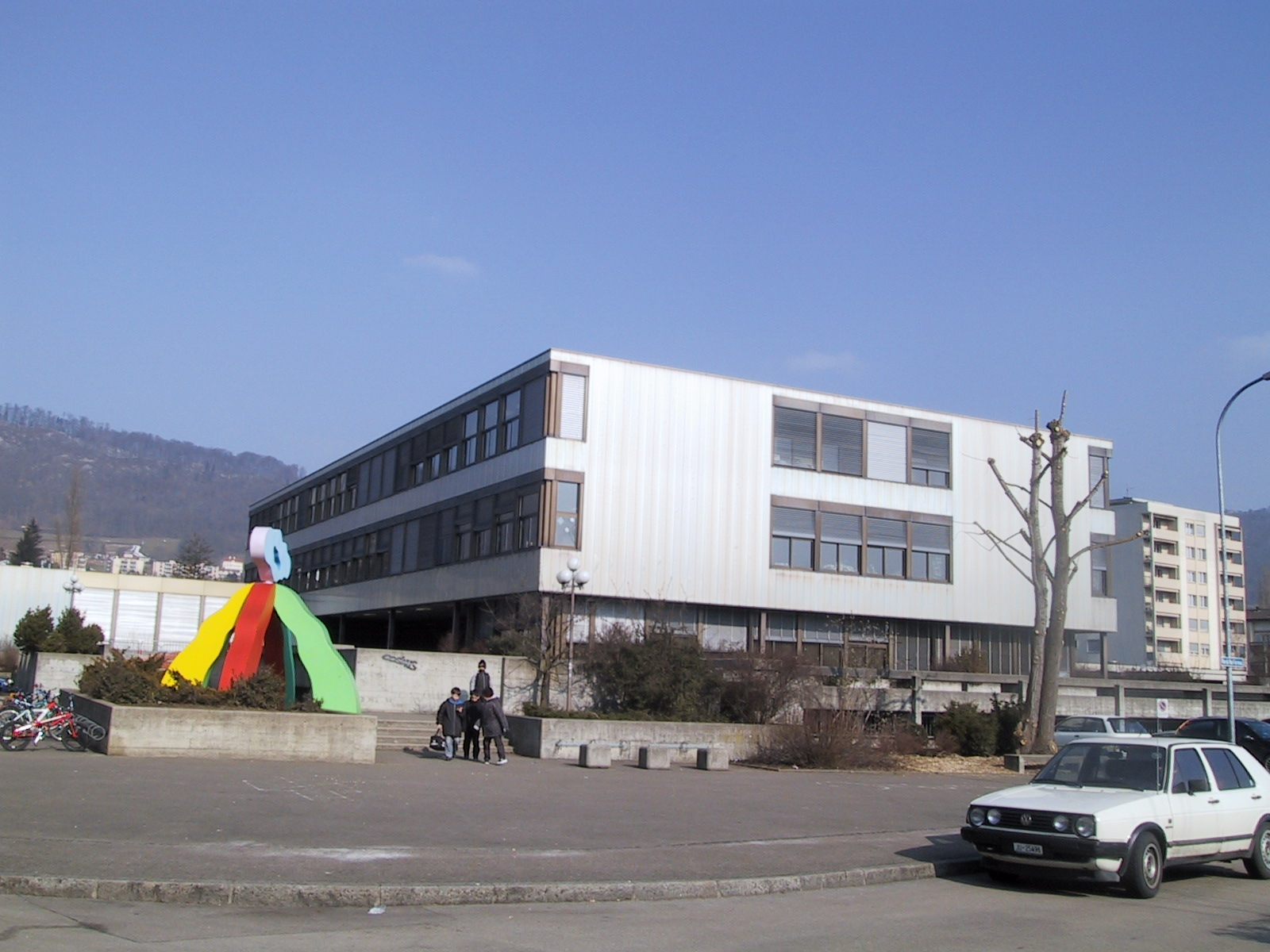
Primary school in Delémont

In Delémont about 3,706 or (32.6%) of the population have completed non-mandatory upper secondary education, and 1,308 or (11.5%) have completed additional higher education (either university or a Fachhochschule). Of the 1,308 who completed tertiary schooling, 54.1% were Swiss men, 28.3% were Swiss women, 10.2% were non-Swiss men and 7.5% were non-Swiss women.

The Canton of Jura school system provides two years of non-obligatory Kindergarten, followed by six years of Primary school. This is followed by three years of obligatory lower Secondary school where the students are separated according to ability and aptitude. Following the lower Secondary students may attend a three- or four-year optional upper Secondary school followed by some form of Tertiary school or they may enter an apprenticeship.

During the 2009–10 school year, there were a total of 1,471 students attending 78 classes in Delémont. There were 13 kindergarten classes with a total of 236 students in the municipality. The municipality had 35 primary classes and 690 students. During the same year, there were 30 lower secondary classes with a total of 545 students.

As of 2000, there were 631 students in Delémont who came from another municipality, while 277 residents attended schools outside the municipality.

Delémont is home to the Bibliothèque municipale de Delémont library. As of 2008, it had 32,698 books or other media, and loaned out 64,610 items in the same year. It was open a total of 289 days with average of 27 hours per week during that year.

== Sport ==
The football club SR Delémont play in the Swiss Challenge League.

== Notable people ==
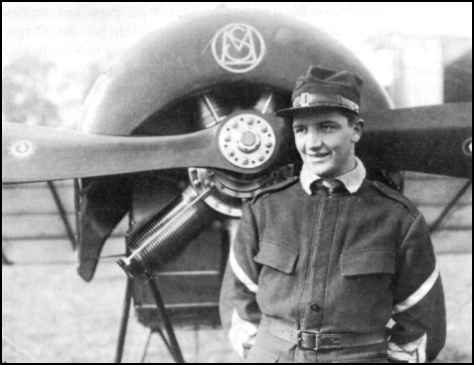
Alfred Comte, 1914

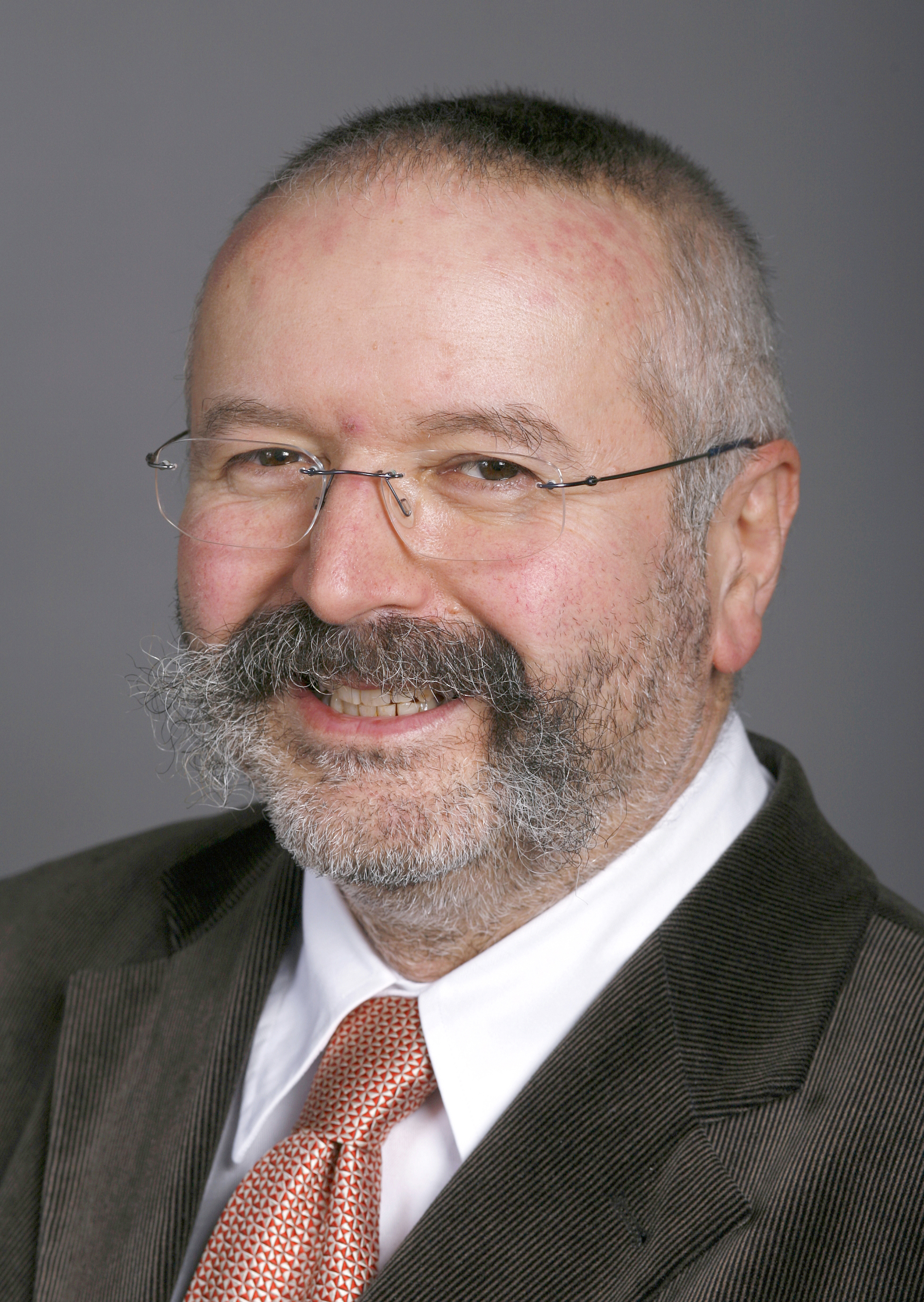
Dominique Baettig, 2008

- Eugène Daumas (1803 in Delémont – 1871), French general and writer
- Marguerite Gobat (1870–1937), Swiss editor, teacher and pacifist
- Alfred Comte (1895 in Delémont – 1965), Swiss aviation pioneer
- Job (born 1927 in Delémont), aka André Jobin, Swiss francophone comics creator.
- Heidi Baader-Nobs (born 1940 in Delémont), Swiss composer
- Gérard Daucourt (born 1941 in Delémont), Catholic bishop of Nanterre 2002–2013
- Pierre Margot (born 1950 in Delémont), Swiss forensic scientist, invented a forensic light source Polilight
- Dominique Baettig (born 1953 in Delémont), psychiatrist and politician
- Maurice Kottelat (born 1957 in Delémont), Swiss ichthyologist specializing in Eurasian freshwater fish

Sport

- Julien Vauclair (born 1979 in Delémont), Swiss former professional ice hockey defenseman
