= Movelier =

- Municipality
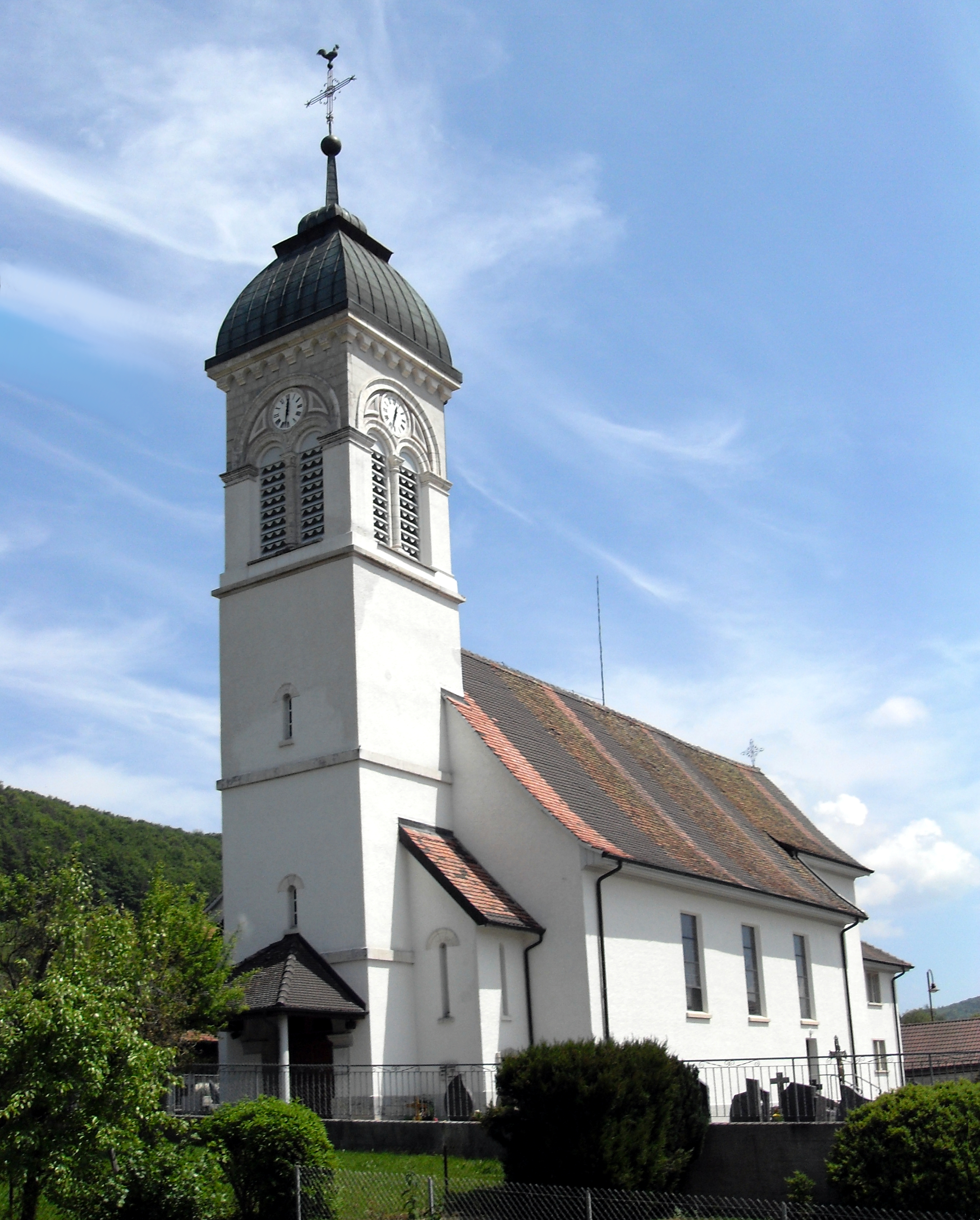

- Coat of arms
- Location of Movelier
- Location within Switzerland Location within Canton of Jura
- Coordinates: 47°25′N 07°18′E
- Country: Switzerland
- Canton: Jura
- District: Delémont

Government
  - Executive: Conseil communal with 5 members
  - Mayor: Maire; Philippe Kunz (as of 2026)

Area
  - Total: 8.01 km^{2} (3.09 sq mi)
- Elevation: 690 m (2,260 ft)

Population (2020)
  - Total: 415
  - Density: 51.8/km^{2} (134/sq mi)
- Time zone: UTC+01:00 (CET)
  - Summer (DST): UTC+02:00 (CEST)
- Postal code: 2812
- SFOS number: 6718
- ISO 3166 code: CH-JU
- Surrounded by: Soyhières, Mettembert, Pleigne, Ederswiler, Roggenburg(BL)
- Website: www.movelier.ch

Movelier (French pronunciation: [mɔvəlje]) is a municipality in the district of Delémont in the canton of Jura in Switzerland.

== History ==
Movelier is first mentioned in 1188 as Moderswilre. The municipality was formerly known by its German name Moderswiler, however, that name is no longer used.

== Geography ==
Movelier has an area of 8.08 km^{2} (3.12 sq mi). Of this area, 3.69 km^{2} (1.42 mi^{2}) or 45.7% is used for agricultural purposes, while 3.98 km^{2} (1.54 mi^{2}) or 49.3% is forested. Of the rest of the land, 0.37 km^{2} (0.14 mi^{2}) or 4.6% is settled (buildings or roads).

Of the built up area, housing and buildings made up 2.6% and transportation infrastructure made up 1.6%. Out of the forested land, 45.8% of the total land area is heavily forested and 3.5% is covered with orchards or small clusters of trees. Of the agricultural land, 15.7% is used for growing crops and 15.7% is pastures and 13.5% is used for alpine pastures.

The municipality is located in the Delemont district, on a plain north of Delemont near the French border.

== Coat of arms ==
The blazon of the municipal coat of arms is Argent, a Mule Gules statant on Coupeaux Vert.

== Demographics ==
Movelier has a population (as of December 2020) of 415. As of 2008, 4.9% of the population are resident foreign nationals. Over the last 10 years (2000–2010) the population has changed at a rate of -0.5%. Migration accounted for -3.1%, while births and deaths accounted for -2.3%.

Most of the population (as of 2000) speaks French (298 or 76.4%) as their first language, German is the second most common (89 or 22.8%) and Italian is the third (1 or 0.3%).

As of 2008, the population was 51.2% male and 48.8% female. The population was made up of 183 Swiss men (47.5% of the population) and 14 (3.6%) non-Swiss men. There were 176 Swiss women (45.7%) and 12 (3.1%) non-Swiss women. Of the population in the municipality, 197 or about 50.5% were born in Movelier and lived there in 2000. There were 74 or 19.0% who were born in the same canton, while 83 or 21.3% were born somewhere else in Switzerland, and 28 or 7.2% were born outside of Switzerland.

As of 2000, children and teenagers (0–19 years old) make up 25.1% of the population, while adults (20–64 years old) make up 59.5% and seniors (over 64 years old) make up 15.4%.

As of 2000, there were 153 people who were single and never married in the municipality. There were 196 married individuals, 26 widows or widowers and 15 individuals who are divorced.

As of 2000, there were 157 private households in the municipality, and an average of 2.4 persons per household. There were 46 households that consist of only one person and 15 households with five or more people. In 2000, a total of 155 apartments (73.8% of the total) were permanently occupied, while 44 apartments (21.0%) were seasonally occupied and 11 apartments (5.2%) were empty. As of 2009, the construction rate of new housing units was 2.6 new units per 1000 residents. The vacancy rate for the municipality, in 2010, was 4.67%.

The historical population is given in the following chart:

== Politics ==
In the 2007 federal election the most popular party was the SPS which received 30.08% of the vote. The next three most popular parties were the SVP (29.66%), the CVP (24.15%) and the FDP (10.59%). In the federal election, a total of 118 votes were cast, and the voter turnout was 36.9%.

== Economy ==
As of 2010, Movelier had an unemployment rate of 5.3%. As of 2008, there were 27 people employed in the primary economic sector and about 8 businesses involved in this sector. 8 people were employed in the secondary sector and there were 6 businesses in this sector. 40 people were employed in the tertiary sector, with 11 businesses in this sector. There were 176 residents of the municipality who were employed in some capacity, of which females made up 36.4% of the workforce.

In 2008 the total number of full-time equivalent jobs was 59. The number of jobs in the primary sector was 20, all of which were in agriculture. The number of jobs in the secondary sector was 8 of which 4 or (50.0%) were in manufacturing and 4 (50.0%) were in construction. The number of jobs in the tertiary sector was 31. In the tertiary sector; 7 or 22.6% were in wholesale or retail sales or the repair of motor vehicles, 16 or 51.6% were in the movement and storage of goods, 2 or 6.5% were in a hotel or restaurant, 2 or 6.5% were technical professionals or scientists, 4 or 12.9% were in education.

In 2000, there were 9 workers who commuted into the municipality and 124 workers who commuted away. The municipality is a net exporter of workers, with about 13.8 workers leaving the municipality for every one entering. Of the working population, 13.6% used public transportation to get to work, and 61.4% used a private car.

== Religion ==
From the 2000 census, 268 or 68.7% were Roman Catholic, while 55 or 14.1% belonged to the Swiss Reformed Church. Of the rest of the population, there were 20 individuals (or about 5.13% of the population) who belonged to another Christian church. There were 3 (or about 0.77% of the population) who were Islamic. There were 4 individuals who belonged to another church. 44 (or about 11.28% of the population) belonged to no church, are agnostic or atheist, and 6 individuals (or about 1.54% of the population) did not answer the question.

== Education ==
In Movelier about 132 or (33.8%) of the population have completed non-mandatory upper secondary education, and 23 or (5.9%) have completed additional higher education (either university or a Fachhochschule). Of the 23 who completed tertiary schooling, 56.5% were Swiss men, 30.4% were Swiss women.

The Canton of Jura school system provides two year of non-obligatory Kindergarten, followed by six years of Primary school. This is followed by three years of obligatory lower Secondary school where the students are separated according to ability and aptitude. Following the lower Secondary students may attend a three or four year optional upper Secondary school followed by some form of Tertiary school or they may enter an apprenticeship.

During the 2009–10 school year, there were no students attending school in Movelier.

As of 2000, there were 11 students in Movelier who came from another municipality, while 33 residents attended schools outside the municipality.
