= Philippe Decourroux =

Philippe Decourroux (born March 18th, 1960) is a Christian Swiss singer-songwriter. Philippe Bieri took the stage name Philipe Decourroux meaning "from Courroux" (his home town). He's a drummer and singer, but he also plays the piano and the guitar. He wrote many songs and released eight albums.

== Discography ==
- Ambassadeurs (1993)
- Entre le rose et le noir (1995)
- Comme avant (1997)
- Pour mieux t'aimer (1998)
- Pour toi (2001)
- Tant qu'il y aura des hommes (2002)
- Pour toi mon Dieu (Jurassic Praise Band) (2003)
- Une autre terre (2005)
- A contre-courant (2007/2008)
