= Marguerite Gobat =

Swiss pacifist

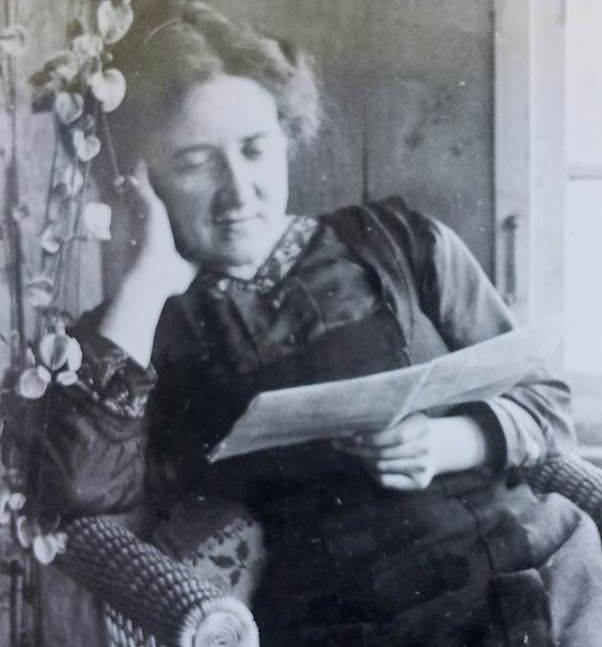
Marguerite Gobat

Marguerite Gobat (23 February 1870 – 19 July 1937) was a Swiss editor, teacher and pacifist.

== Biography ==
Marguerite Gobat was born on 23 February 1870 in Delémont, Switzerland. Her father Albert Gobat (1843–1914) was a well-known pacifist, and jointly won the Nobel Peace Prize in 1902 along with Élie Ducommun.

She was actively involved in global peace and women's welfare. In 1915 she founded World Union of Women for International Concord in Geneva along with Clara Guthrie d'Arcis and 35 women from different countries. She was one of the founders of Women's International League for Peace and Freedom.

She died on 19 July 1937 in Evilard.
