= Prince-Bishops' Castle (Delémont) =

Castle in Delémont, Switzerland

Prince-Bishops' Castle of Delémont
- Delémont
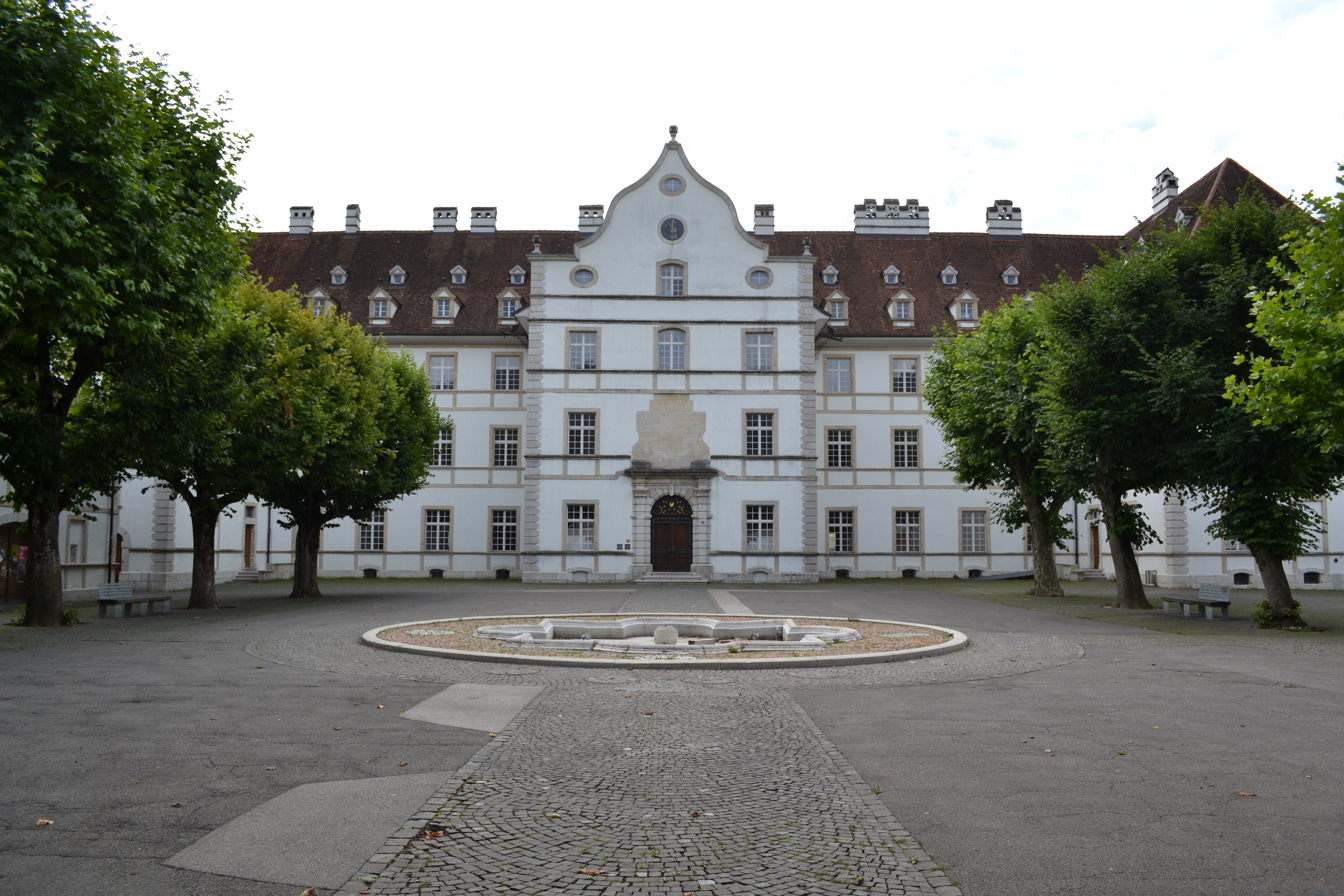
- The Prince-Bishops' Castle

Site information
- Code: CH-JU
- Condition: preserved

Location
- Coordinates: 47°21′50″N 7°20′34″E
- Height: 422 m above the sea

Site history
- Built: 18th century

The Prince-Bishops' Castle is a castle in the municipality of Delémont of the Canton of Jura in Switzerland. It is a Swiss heritage site of national significance. Nowadays, the castle hosts a primary school.

== See also ==
- List of castles in Switzerland
