= List of mayors of Delémont =

This is a list of mayors of Delémont in canton of Jura, Switzerland. The city of Delémont has a five-member executive (conseil communal) chaired by the mayor (maire).

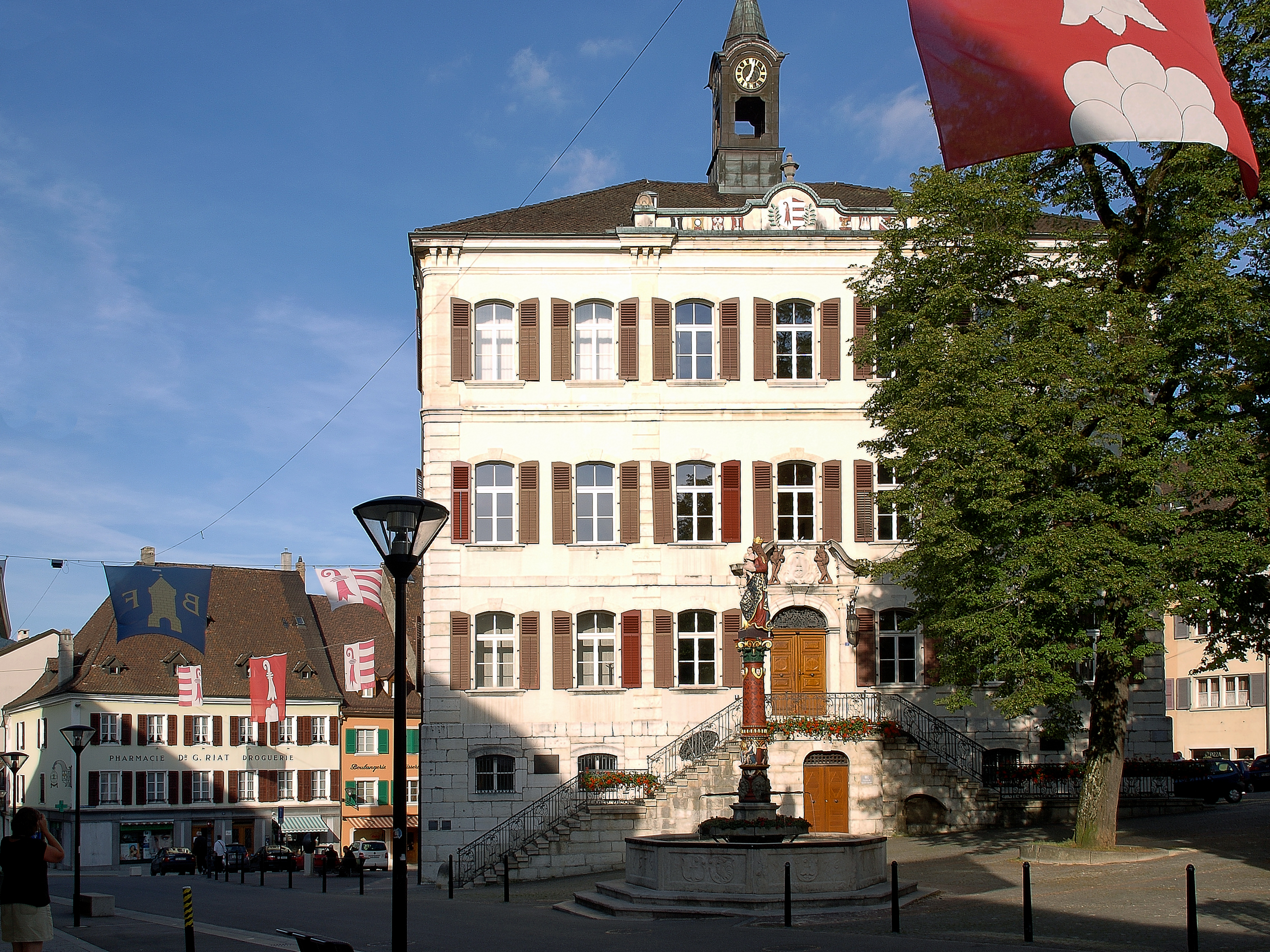
Hôtel-de-Ville, Delémont

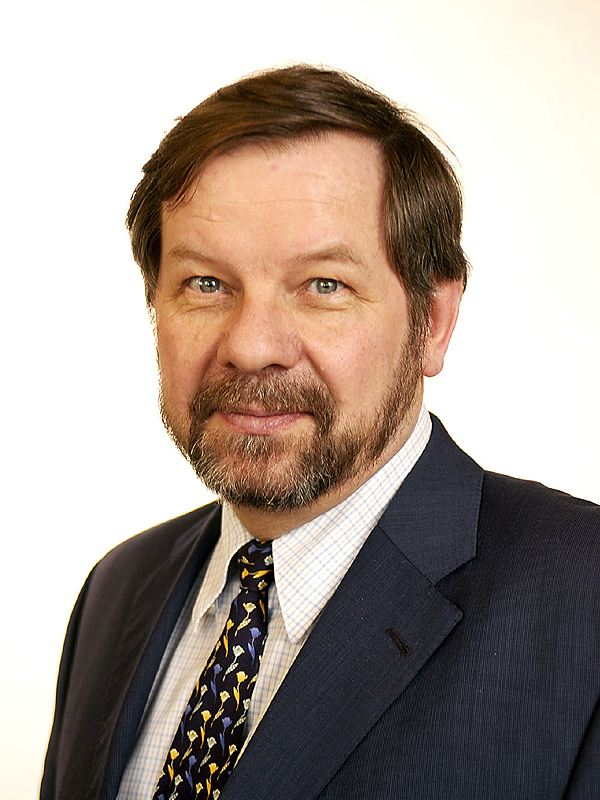
Pierre-Alain Gentil (1952–2008) was mayor from 1994 to 2004

Coat of arms of Delémont

Mayor of Delémont (maire de Delémont)
Term	Mayor	Lifespan	Party	Notes
1895–1904	Victor Helg	(1835–1927)		
1904–1905	Jules Eckert	(1869–1937)		
1905–1909	Oscar Froidevaux	(1877–1953)		
1909–1912	Emile Zurbrügg			
1912–1913	Serge Gobat	(1885–1937)		
1913–1918	Emile Meier			
1918–1919	Joseph Amgwerd	(1884–1942)		
1919–1922	Serge Gobat	(1885–1937)		
1922–1928	Alexandre Hof	(1894–1950)		
1929–1935	Gaston Girod			
1935–1943	Gustave Riat	(1883–1954)		
1943–1952	Louis Lovis	(1913–1982)		
1953–1960	Henri Parrat	(1909–1980)	PSS	
1960–1981	Georges Scherrer	(1924–2005)	PSS	
1981–1993	Jacques Stadelmann	(born 1938)	PSS	
1994–2004	Pierre-Alain Gentil	(1952–2008)	PSS	
2005–2008	Gilles Froidevaux	(born 1971)	PSS	
2009–2015	Pierre Kohler	(born 1964)	PDC	
2015–present	Damien Chappuis		PCSI	
