= Polilight =

The Polilight is a portable, high-intensity, filtered light source used by forensic scientists and others to detect fingerprints, bodily fluids and other evidence from crime scenes and other places.

Similar products to the Polilight Hola include the Foster + Freeman Crime-lite, Ultralite ALS and the Optimax Multilite, all of which use light-emitting diodes to produce high-intensity light of varying wavelengths.

== History ==
The device was invented by Pierre Margot, Ron Warrener, Hilton Kobus, Milutin Stoilovic and Chris Lennard. It was developed from a research project to find an alternative to the laser method of fingerprint detection used in the 1970s. In the 1980s, the project began at the Australian National University. It was funded by the Australian Federal Police. The university's commercial company, Anutech Pty Ltd, sold the concept to Rofin Australia Pty Ltd, who developed it into the Polilight.

Several Polilight models have been released, including the Polilight 6/150W, Polilight 10/300W and the Polilight500, sometimes abbreviated to PL6, PL10 and PL500. The PL500 ('500' refers to the power in watts of the xenon arc lamp) has eleven monochromatic bands, a ‘blank’ position that provides high intensity white light in the range from 380 to 650 nm and an optional infra-red output suitable for document examination.

The Polilight was named by the Powerhouse Museum as one of the top 100 Australian innovations of the 20th century. Its worldwide use was acknowledged by the Australian Export Awards in 2005.
