= Soyhières =

- Municipality
- Coat of arms
- Location of Soyhières
- Location within Switzerland Location within Canton of Jura
- Coordinates: 47°24′N 07°22′E
- Country: Switzerland
- Canton: Jura
- District: Delémont

Government
  - Executive: Conseil communal with 5 members
  - Mayor: Maire; Christian Zuber (as of 2026)

Area
  - Total: 7.55 km^{2} (2.92 sq mi)
- Elevation: 402 m (1,319 ft)

Population (2020)
  - Total: 436
  - Density: 57.7/km^{2} (150/sq mi)
- Time zone: UTC+01:00 (CET)
  - Summer (DST): UTC+02:00 (CEST)
- Postal code: 2805
- SFOS number: 6724
- ISO 3166 code: CH-JU
- Surrounded by: Courroux, Delémont, Mettembert, Movelier, Roggenburg(BL), Liesberg(BL)
- Website: www.soyhieres.ch

Soyhières (French pronunciation: [swajɛʁ]) is a municipality in the district of Delémont in the canton of Jura in Switzerland.

== History ==
Aerial view (1953)

Soyhières is first mentioned in 1102 as Sougere. In 1136 it was mentioned as Sohires and in 1212 as Sogron. The municipality was formerly known by its German name Saugern; however, that name is no longer used.

== Geography ==
Soyhières has an area of 7.51 km^{2} (2.90 sq mi). Of this area, 2.25 km^{2} (0.87 mi^{2}) or 30.0% is used for agricultural purposes, while 4.63 km^{2} (1.79 mi^{2}) or 61.7% is forested. Of the rest of the land, 0.56 km^{2} (0.22 mi^{2}) or 7.5% is settled (buildings or roads), 0.05 km^{2} (12 acres) or 0.7% is either rivers or lakes and 0.03 km^{2} (7.4 acres) or 0.4% is unproductive land.

Of the built up area, housing and buildings made up 2.3% and transportation infrastructure made up 3.6%. Power and water infrastructure as well as other special developed areas made up 1.2% of the area Out of the forested land, 58.1% of the total land area is heavily forested and 3.6% is covered with orchards or small clusters of trees. Of the agricultural land, 10.9% is used for growing crops and 6.1% is pastures and 12.1% is used for alpine pastures. Of the water in the municipality, 0.3% is in lakes and 0.4% is in rivers and streams.

The municipality is located in the Delemont district, on the banks of the Birs river. It consists of the village of Soyhières on the left bank of the Birs and the hamlet of Les Riedes-Dessus on the right.

== Coat of arms ==
The blazon of the municipal coat of arms is Quartered Gules a Hare salient Argent and Azure a Wing sinister of the second.

== Demographics ==
Soyhières has a population (as of December 2020) of 436. As of 2008, 15.3% of the population are resident foreign nationals. Over the last 10 years (2000–2010) the population has changed at a rate of -5.9%. Migration accounted for -4.7%, while births and deaths accounted for 2%.

Most of the population (as of 2000) speaks French (387 or 77.4%) as their first language, German is the second most common (86 or 17.2%) and Italian is the third (11 or 2.2%).

As of 2008, the population was 48.4% male and 51.6% female. The population was made up of 191 Swiss men (39.7% of the population) and 42 (8.7%) non-Swiss men. There were 212 Swiss women (44.1%) and 36 (7.5%) non-Swiss women. Of the population in the municipality, 158 or about 31.6% were born in Soyhières and lived there in 2000. There were 135 or 27.0% who were born in the same canton, while 106 or 21.2% were born somewhere else in Switzerland, and 78 or 15.6% were born outside of Switzerland.

As of 2000, children and teenagers (0–19 years old) make up 31.6% of the population, while adults (20–64 years old) make up 54.4% and seniors (over 64 years old) make up 14%.

As of 2000, there were 225 people who were single and never married in the municipality. There were 219 married individuals, 29 widows or widowers and 27 individuals who are divorced.

As of 2000, there were 183 private households in the municipality, and an average of 2.5 persons per household. There were 56 households that consist of only one person and 26 households with five or more people. In 2000, a total of 178 apartments (90.8% of the total) were permanently occupied, while 9 apartments (4.6%) were seasonally occupied and 9 apartments (4.6%) were empty. As of 2009, the construction rate of new housing units was 2.1 new units per 1000 residents. The vacancy rate for the municipality, in 2010, was 3.21%.

The historical population is given in the following chart:

== Politics ==
In the 2007 federal election the most popular party was the SPS which received 28.1% of the vote. The next three most popular parties were the SPS (28.1%), the CVP (21.49%) and the CSP (14.05%). In the federal election, a total of 124 votes were cast, and the voter turnout was 38.9%.

== Economy ==
As of 2010, Soyhières had an unemployment rate of 5.5%. As of 2008, there were 16 people employed in the primary economic sector and about 5 businesses involved in this sector. 24 people were employed in the secondary sector and there were 4 businesses in this sector. 63 people were employed in the tertiary sector, with 16 businesses in this sector. There were 242 residents of the municipality who were employed in some capacity, of which females made up 48.8% of the workforce.

In 2008 the total number of full-time equivalent jobs was 84. The number of jobs in the primary sector was 12, all of which were in agriculture. The number of jobs in the secondary sector was 23 of which 14 or (60.9%) were in manufacturing and 9 (39.1%) were in construction. The number of jobs in the tertiary sector was 49. In the tertiary sector; 4 or 8.2% were in wholesale or retail sales or the repair of motor vehicles, 4 or 8.2% were in the movement and storage of goods, 24 or 49.0% were in a hotel or restaurant, 4 or 8.2% were technical professionals or scientists, 4 or 8.2% were in education and 3 or 6.1% were in health care.

In 2000, there were 34 workers who commuted into the municipality and 184 workers who commuted away. The municipality is a net exporter of workers, with about 5.4 workers leaving the municipality for every one entering. Of the working population, 11.6% used public transportation to get to work, and 64.5% used a private car.

== Religion ==
From the 2000 census, 332 or 66.4% were Roman Catholic, while 90 or 18.0% belonged to the Swiss Reformed Church. Of the rest of the population, there were 20 individuals (or about 4.00% of the population) who belonged to another Christian church. There were 2 individuals (or about 0.40% of the population) who were Jewish, and 11 (or about 2.20% of the population) who were Islamic. 21 (or about 4.20% of the population) belonged to no church, are agnostic or atheist, and 33 individuals (or about 6.60% of the population) did not answer the question.

== Education ==
In Soyhières about 151 or (30.2%) of the population have completed non-mandatory upper secondary education, and 38 or (7.6%) have completed additional higher education (either university or a Fachhochschule). Of the 38 who completed tertiary schooling, 47.4% were Swiss men, 28.9% were Swiss women, 15.8% were non-Swiss men.

The Canton of Jura school system provides two year of non-obligatory Kindergarten, followed by six years of Primary school. This is followed by three years of obligatory lower Secondary school where the students are separated according to ability and aptitude. Following the lower Secondary students may attend a three or four year optional upper Secondary school followed by some form of Tertiary school or they may enter an apprenticeship.

During the 2009–10 school year, there were no students attending school in Soyhières.

As of 2000, there were 6 students in Soyhières who came from another municipality, while 28 residents attended schools outside the municipality.
