= Pierre Margot =

Swiss forensics scientist (born 1950)

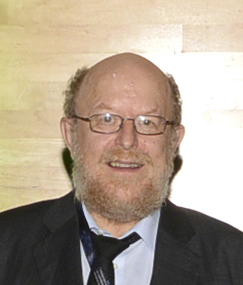
- Born: 25 February 1950 (age 76); Delémont, Switzerland
- Known for: Invention of the polilight for the forensic identification field
- Awards: Doctorate honoris causa Douglas M. Lucas Award; Merentibus Award; John A. Dondero Award
- Scientific career
- Fields: Fingerprint Forensic scientist
- Workplaces: University of Lausanne

Pierre Margot is a Swiss forensics scientist known for his contribution to the invention of the first forensic light source Polilight for the detection of fingerprint, biological fluids and other evidence on the crime scene. This new technology was named by the Powerhouse Museum as one of the top 100 Australian innovations of the 20th century. It was a great revolution in the field of forensic identification since this light could be used at the crime scene, unlike lasers at that time.

== Biography ==
Pierre Margot was born in Delémont (Switzerland) on 25 February 1950. He obtained his degree in forensic science and criminology at the University of Lausanne in 1974. He then obtained his master's degree (1977) and PhD (1980) in forensic science at the University of Strathclyde, Glasgow, Scotland. He then continued his post-doctoral studies in toxicology in Salt Lake City, Utah. In 1986, he became the fourth director of the Institute of Forensic Science and Criminology (IPSC) of the University of Lausanne; he held this position until 2016. During his career, he has contributed to numerous articles in forensic journals, written many books and book chapters, and has also given several lectures worldwide.

== Work ==
Because of his expertise in forensics, Pierre Margot has worked on several international issues. In 1972, in Northern Ireland, he participated in the investigation of Bloody Sunday with Doug Lucas and Peter Forest. He then continued his international involvement in 1985, during his participation in the investigation of the Sinking of the Rainbow Warrior. In 1989, while working at the Australian National University in Canberra, Australia, he participated (with Ron Warrener, Hilton Kobus, Milutin Stoilovic and Chris Lennard) to the invention of the Polilight. He participated, among other during his career, to the investigation of the massacres of the Order of the Solar Temple (1994–1997) in Canada and in Suisse, as well as on the Omagh bombing in Northern Ireland (1998, with Doug Lucas and Peter Forest).

== Distinctions ==
- 2004: Merentibus Award – Krakov (Poland) – higher distinction awarded by the Institute of Forensic Research
- 2010: Recognition Award – Rofin Forensic (Australia) – for the development of the Polilight
- 2011: Douglas M. Lucas Award – American Academy of Forensic Sciences
- 2013: Doctorate honoris causa of the Université du Québec à Trois-Rivières
- 2014: John A. Dondero Memorial Award of the International Association for Identification
- 2014: Nominated to the French Forensic Science Hall of Fame of the Association Québécoise de Criminalistique

== Scientific groups ==
- Switzerland representative and member of the International Association for Identification
- Member of the Swiss Chamber of technical legal experts and scientists
- Honorary member of the Forensic Science Society (UK)
- Fellow of the American Academy of Forensic Sciences
- Member of the Association québécoise de criminalistique (Canada)
- Member of the Jura Institute of Sciences, Letters and Arts

== Books ==
- Kuhn A., Schwarzenegger C., Margot P., Donatsch A., Aebi M.F., Jositsch D. (eds.), Criminology, Criminal Policy and Criminal Law in an International Perspective: essays in honour of Martin Killias on the occasion of his 65th birthday. Stämpfli, Bern, 2013.
- Champod C, Lennard C, Margot P, Stoilovic M, Fingerprints and Other Ridge Skin Impressions. CRC Press, Boca Raton, 2004.
