= Mettembert =

- Municipality
- Flag Coat of arms
- Location of Mettembert
- Location within Switzerland Location within Canton of Jura
- Coordinates: 47°24′N 07°19′E
- Country: Switzerland
- Canton: Jura
- District: Delémont

Government
  - Mayor: Maire

Area
  - Total: 2.41 km^{2} (0.93 sq mi)
- Elevation: 660 m (2,170 ft)

Population (2003)
  - Total: 133
  - Density: 55.2/km^{2} (143/sq mi)
- Time zone: UTC+01:00 (CET)
  - Summer (DST): UTC+02:00 (CEST)
- Postal code: 2806
- SFOS number: 6716
- ISO 3166 code: CH-JU
- Surrounded by: Delémont, Pleigne, Movelier, Soyhières
- Website: website missing SFSO statistics

Mettembert (French pronunciation: [mɛtɑ̃bɛʁ]) is a municipality in the district of Delémont in the canton of Jura in Switzerland.

== History ==
Mettembert is first mentioned in 1170 as Mettenbere. In 1208 it was mentioned as Mettenberg. The municipality was formerly known by its German name Mittemberg, however, that name is no longer used. Until 1 January 1984 it was officially known as Mettemberg.

== Geography ==
Mettembert has an area of 2.34 km^{2} (0.90 sq mi). Of this area, 0.93 km^{2} (0.36 mi^{2}) or 40.1% is used for agricultural purposes, while 1.24 km^{2} (0.48 mi^{2}) or 53.4% is forested. Of the rest of the land, 0.18 km^{2} (0.069 mi^{2}) or 7.8% is settled (buildings or roads) and 0.01 km^{2} (2.5 acres) or 0.4% is unproductive land.

Of the built up area, housing and buildings made up 3.0% and transportation infrastructure made up 4.3%. Out of the forested land, 51.7% of the total land area is heavily forested and 1.7% is covered with orchards or small clusters of trees. Of the agricultural land, 17.2% is used for growing crops and 10.8% is pastures and 11.6% is used for alpine pastures.

The municipality is located in the Delemont district, on the exposed side of a small valley north-west of Delemont.

== Coat of arms ==
The blazon of the municipal coat of arms is Or, a Billy Goat Sable attired, langued and hoofed Gules.

== Demographics ==
Mettembert has a population (as of December 2020) of 108. As of 2008, 9.4% of the population are resident foreign nationals. Over the last 10 years (2000–2010) the population has changed at a rate of -4.7%. Migration accounted for 4.7%, while births and deaths accounted for 0.8%.

Most of the population (as of 2000) speaks French (99 or 85.3%) as their first language, German is the second most common (14 or 12.1%) and Italian is the third (2 or 1.7%).

As of 2008, the population was 47.9% male and 52.1% female. The population was made up of 49 Swiss men (40.5% of the population) and 9 (7.4%) non-Swiss men. There were 60 Swiss women (49.6%) and 3 (2.5%) non-Swiss women. Of the population in the municipality, 45 or about 38.8% were born in Mettembert and lived there in 2000. There were 31 or 26.7% who were born in the same canton, while 24 or 20.7% were born somewhere else in Switzerland, and 15 or 12.9% were born outside of Switzerland.

As of 2000, children and teenagers (0–19 years old) make up 32.8% of the population, while adults (20–64 years old) make up 56% and seniors (over 64 years old) make up 11.2%.

As of 2000, there were 54 people who were single and never married in the municipality. There were 56 married individuals, 5 widows or widowers and 1 individuals who are divorced.

As of 2000, there were 41 private households in the municipality, and an average of 2.8 persons per household. There were 10 households that consist of only one person and 7 households with five or more people. In 2000, a total of 37 apartments (72.5% of the total) were permanently occupied, while 11 apartments (21.6%) were seasonally occupied and 3 apartments (5.9%) were empty. The vacancy rate for the municipality, in 2010, was 1.75%.

The historical population is given in the following chart:

== Politics ==
In the 2007 federal election the most popular party was the SPS which received 45% of the vote. The next three most popular parties were the CVP (32%), the CSP (11%) and the FDP (8%). In the federal election, a total of 54 votes were cast, and the voter turnout was 52.4%.

== Economy ==
As of 2010, Mettembert had an unemployment rate of 3.4%. As of 2008, there were 9 people employed in the primary economic sector and about 3 businesses involved in this sector. No one was employed in the secondary sector. 5 people were employed in the tertiary sector, with 3 businesses in this sector. There were 58 residents of the municipality who were employed in some capacity, of which females made up 39.7% of the workforce.

In 2008 the total number of full-time equivalent jobs was 13. The number of jobs in the primary sector was 8, all of which were in agriculture. There were no jobs in the secondary sector. The number of jobs in the tertiary sector was 5; 1 was in the sale or repair of motor vehicles and 2 were in a hotel or restaurant.

In 2000, there were 2 workers who commuted into the municipality and 40 workers who commuted away. The municipality is a net exporter of workers, with about 20.0 workers leaving the municipality for every one entering. Of the working population, 19% used public transportation to get to work, and 56.9% used a private car.

== Religion ==
From the 2000 census, 83 or 71.6% were Roman Catholic, while 18 or 15.5% belonged to the Swiss Reformed Church. Of the rest of the population, there were 11 individuals (or about 9.48% of the population) who belonged to another Christian church. 8 (or about 6.90% of the population) belonged to no church, are agnostic or atheist, and 1 individuals (or about 0.86% of the population) did not answer the question.

== Education ==
In Mettembert about 36 or (31.0%) of the population have completed non-mandatory upper secondary education, and 15 or (12.9%) have completed additional higher education (either university or a Fachhochschule). Of the 15 who completed tertiary schooling, 60.0% were Swiss men, 20.0% were Swiss women.

The Canton of Jura school system provides two year of non-obligatory Kindergarten, followed by six years of Primary school. This is followed by three years of obligatory lower Secondary school where the students are separated according to ability and aptitude. Following the lower Secondary students may attend a three or four year optional upper Secondary school followed by some form of Tertiary school or they may enter an apprenticeship.

During the 2009–10 school year, there were no students attending school in Mettembert. As of 2000, there were 8 students in Mettembert who came from another municipality, while 28 residents attended schools outside the municipality.
