= Courroux =

- Municipality
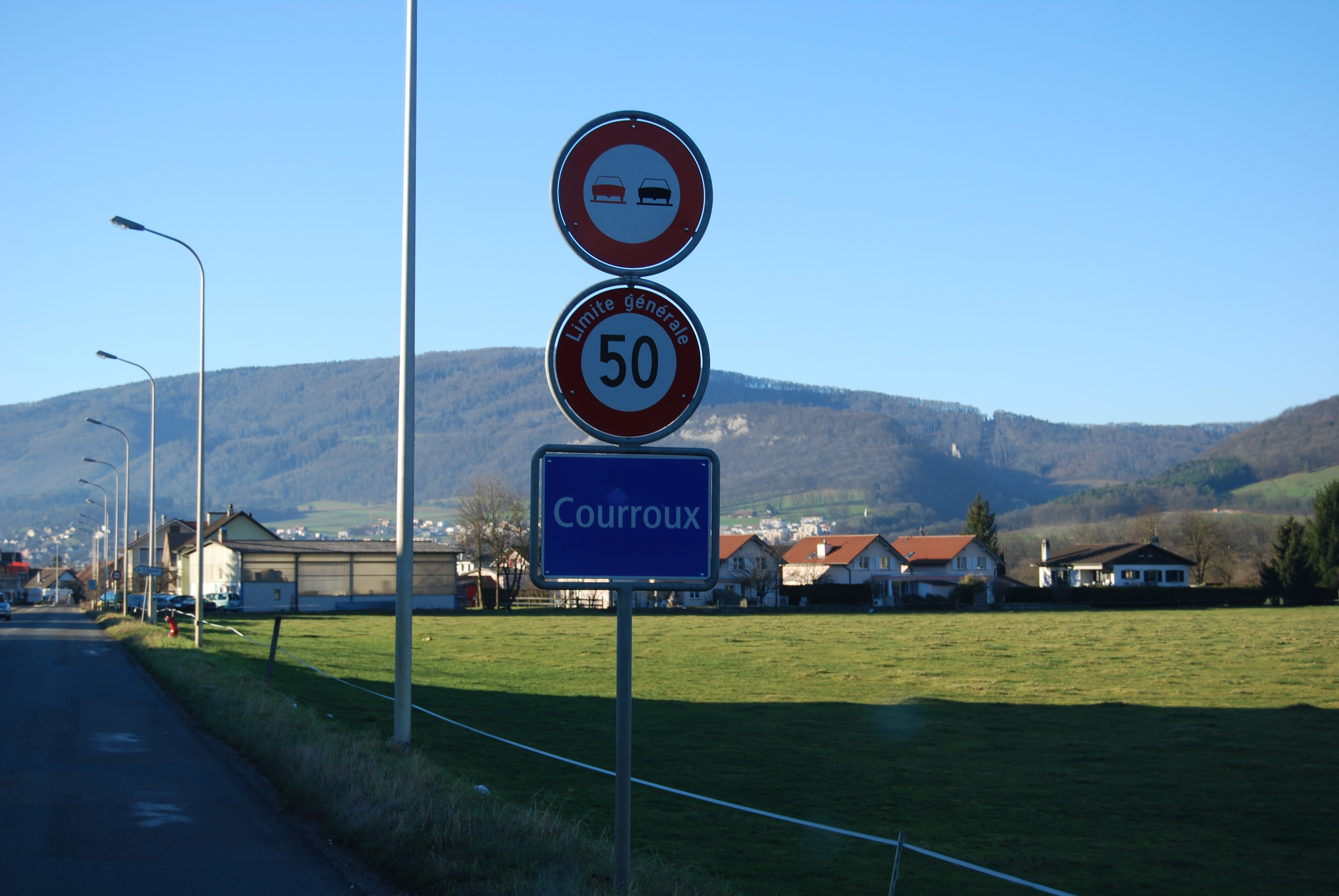
- Courroux village

- Coat of arms
- Location of Courroux
- Location within Switzerland Location within Canton of Jura
- Coordinates: 47°22′N 7°22′E
- Country: Switzerland
- Canton: Jura
- District: Delémont

Government
  - Executive: Conseil communal with 7 members
  - Mayor: Maire; Philippe Membrez FDP/PLR (as of 2026)

Area
  - Total: 19.71 km^{2} (7.61 sq mi)
- Elevation: 418 m (1,371 ft)

Population (December 2004)
  - Total: 2,938
  - Density: 149.1/km^{2} (386.1/sq mi)
- Time zone: UTC+01:00 (CET)
  - Summer (DST): UTC+02:00 (CEST)
- Postal code: 2822
- SFOS number: 6709
- ISO 3166 code: CH-JU
- Surrounded by: Bärschwil (SO), Courrendlin, Delémont, Liesberg (BL), Rebeuvelier, Soyhières, Vicques
- Website: www.courroux.ch

Courroux (French: Courroux, pronounced [kuʁu]; Franc-Comtois: Corrou) is a municipality in the district of Delémont in the canton of Jura in Switzerland.

== History ==
Courroux is first mentioned in 1146 under its German name as Lütoltesdorf. The French name was first mentioned in 1148 as Corolt.

== Geography ==
Aerial view (1947)

Courroux has an area of 19.74 km^{2} (7.62 sq mi). Of this area, 10.52 km^{2} (4.06 mi^{2}) or 53.3% is used for agricultural purposes, while 7.58 km^{2} (2.93 mi^{2}) or 38.4% is forested. Of the rest of the land, 1.48 km^{2} (0.57 mi^{2}) or 7.5% is settled (buildings or roads), 0.11 km^{2} (27 acres) or 0.6% is either rivers or lakes and 0.05 km^{2} (12 acres) or 0.3% is unproductive land.

Of the built up area, housing and buildings made up 4.8% and transportation infrastructure made up 1.7%. Out of the forested land, 36.3% of the total land area is heavily forested and 2.1% is covered with orchards or small clusters of trees. Of the agricultural land, 33.7% is used for growing crops and 10.4% is pastures and 8.6% is used for alpine pastures. All the water in the municipality is flowing water.

The municipality is located in the Delémont district, three kilometers southeast of the city of Delémont and east of the confluence of the Scheulte and Birs rivers. North of the village is the forested Bambois mountain with the peak Roc de Courroux (855 meters [2,805 ft]) named after the village.

In 2011 the municipalities of Corban, Courchapoix, Courroux, Mervelier, Montsevelier, Vermes and Vicques were considering a merger into the new municipality of Val Terbi. However, only the municipalities of Montsevelier, Vermes and Vicques merged on 1 January 2013 into Val Terbi.

== Coat of arms ==
The blazon of the municipal coat of arms is Gules, a Saltire Or, in chief a Mullet of Five of the same.

== Demographics ==
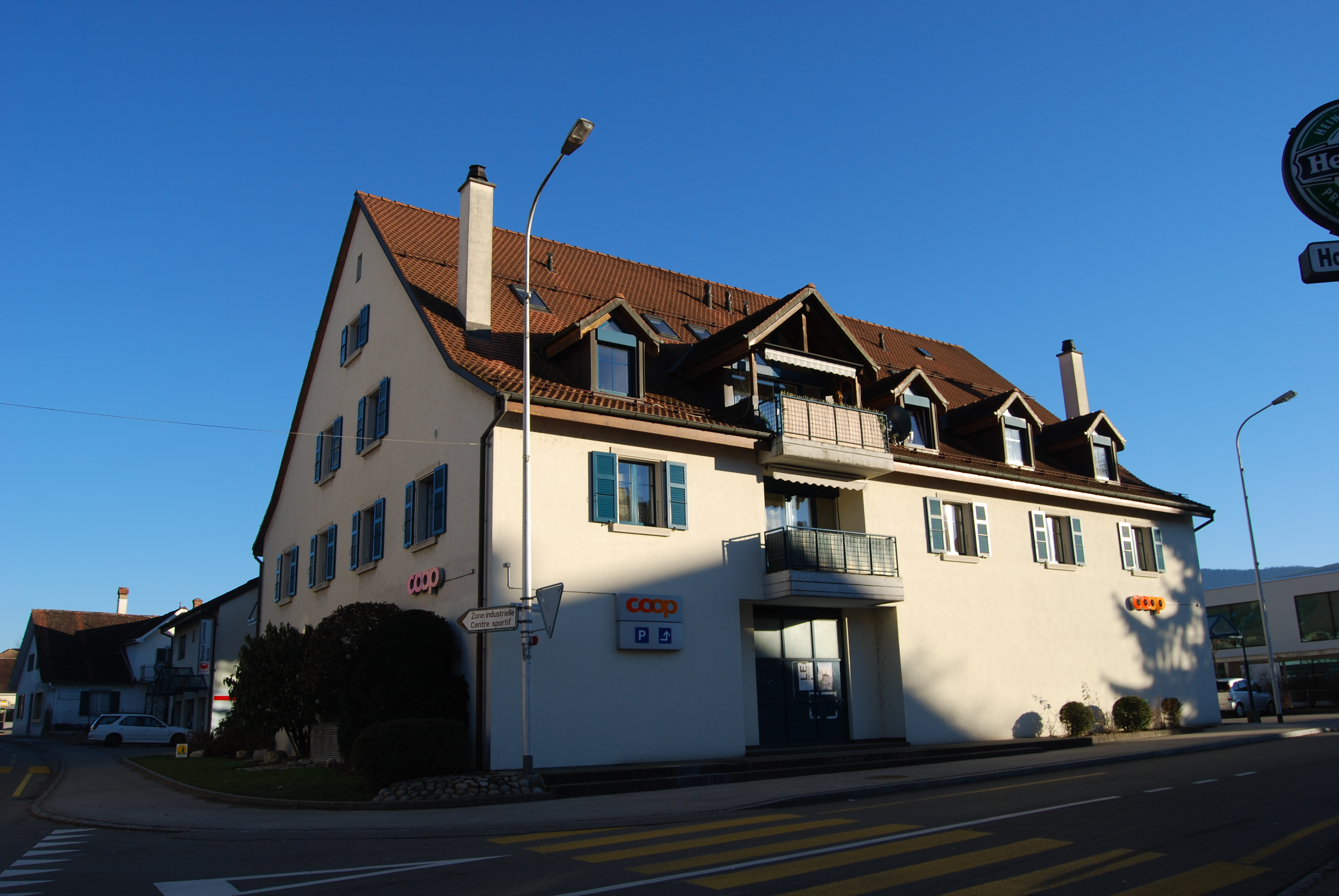
Coop Supermarket in Courroux

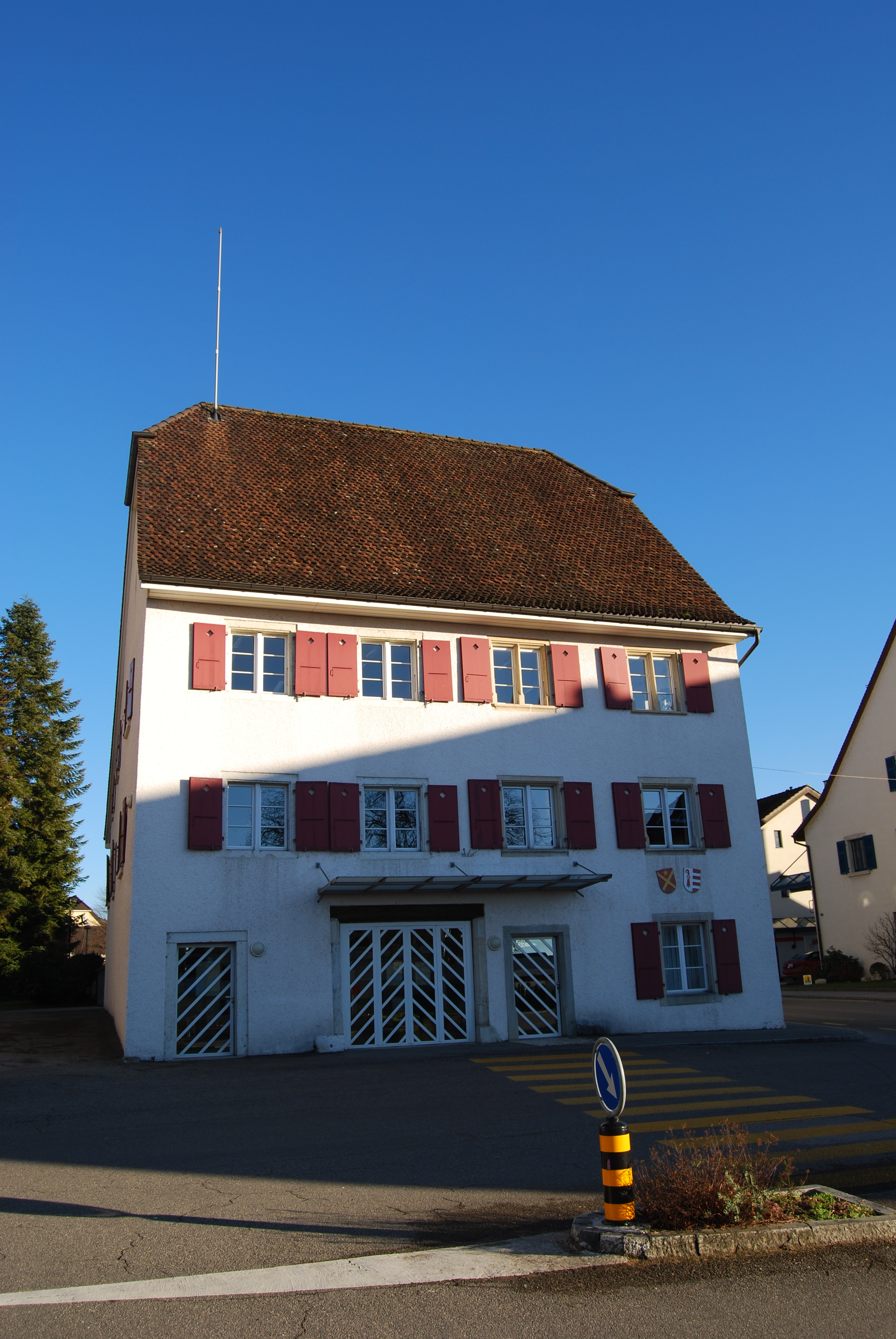
Municipal administration building

Courroux has a population (as of December 2020) of 3,313. As of 2008, 10.0% of the population are resident foreign nationals. Over the last 10 years (2000–2010) the population has changed at a rate of 11.3%. Migration accounted for 5.7%, while births and deaths accounted for 6.1%.

Most of the population (as of 2000) speaks French (2,505 or 91.7%) as their first language, German is the second most common (96 or 3.5%) and Italian is the third (40 or 1.5%). There are 5 people who speak Romansh.

As of 2008, the population was 49.0% male and 51.0% female. The population was made up of 1,343 Swiss men (43.8% of the population) and 161 (5.2%) non-Swiss men. There were 1,414 Swiss women (46.1%) and 151 (4.9%) non-Swiss women. Of the population in the municipality, 1,006 or about 36.8% were born in Courroux and lived there in 2000. There were 962 or 35.2% who were born in the same canton, while 386 or 14.1% were born somewhere else in Switzerland, and 334 or 12.2% were born outside of Switzerland.

As of 2000, children and teenagers (0–19 years old) make up 25.8% of the population, while adults (20–64 years old) make up 62.4% and seniors (over 64 years old) make up 11.8%.

As of 2000, there were 1,095 people who were single and never married in the municipality. There were 1,397 married individuals, 135 widows or widowers and 106 individuals who are divorced.

As of 2000, there were 1,115 private households in the municipality, and an average of 2.4 persons per household. There were 340 households that consist of only one person and 93 households with five or more people. In 2000, a total of 1,069 apartments (90.4% of the total) were permanently occupied, while 12 apartments (1.0%) were seasonally occupied and 102 apartments (8.6%) were empty. As of 2009, the construction rate of new housing units was 2.3 new units per 1000 residents. The vacancy rate for the municipality, in 2010, was 2.25%.

The historical population is given in the following chart:

== Sights ==
The entire hamlet of Courcelon is designated as part of the Inventory of Swiss Heritage Sites.

== Politics ==
In the 2007 federal election the most popular party was the SPS which received 44.06% of the vote. The next three most popular parties were the SVP (17.36%), the CVP (16.15%) and the FDP (11.42%). In the federal election, a total of 887 votes were cast, and the voter turnout was 42.4%.

== Economy ==
As of 2010, Courroux had an unemployment rate of 5.7%. As of 2008, there were 84 people employed in the primary economic sector and about 37 businesses involved in this sector. 319 people were employed in the secondary sector and there were 40 businesses in this sector. 266 people were employed in the tertiary sector, with 58 businesses in this sector. There were 1,394 residents of the municipality who were employed in some capacity, of which females made up 41.7% of the workforce.

In 2008 the total number of full-time equivalent jobs was 574. The number of jobs in the primary sector was 63, all of which were in agriculture. The number of jobs in the secondary sector was 301 of which 148 or (49.2%) were in manufacturing, 46 or (15.3%) were in mining and 87 (28.9%) were in construction. The number of jobs in the tertiary sector was 210. In the tertiary sector; 80 or 38.1% were in wholesale or retail sales or the repair of motor vehicles, 6 or 2.9% were in the movement and storage of goods, 34 or 16.2% were in a hotel or restaurant, 9 or 4.3% were the insurance or financial industry, 13 or 6.2% were technical professionals or scientists, 25 or 11.9% were in education and 23 or 11.0% were in health care.

In 2000, there were 324 workers who commuted into the municipality and 1,035 workers who commuted away. The municipality is a net exporter of workers, with about 3.2 workers leaving the municipality for every one entering. About 4.9% of the workforce coming into Courroux are coming from outside Switzerland. Of the working population, 13.1% used public transportation to get to work, and 65.4% used a private car.

== Religion ==
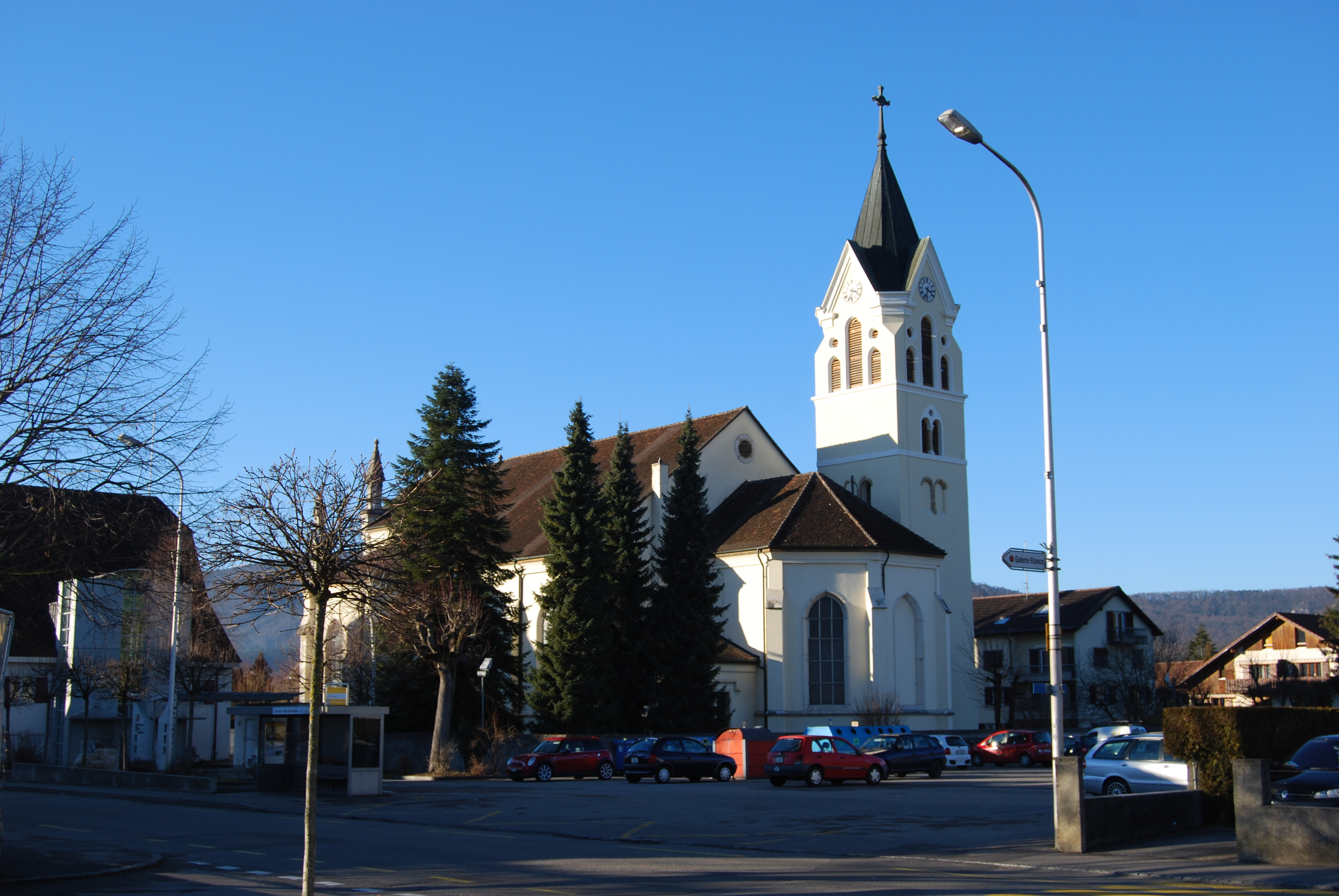
Church of Courroux

From the 2000 census, 2,005 or 73.4% were Roman Catholic, while 379 or 13.9% belonged to the Swiss Reformed Church. Of the rest of the population, there were 6 members of an Orthodox church (or about 0.22% of the population), there were 5 individuals (or about 0.18% of the population) who belonged to the Christian Catholic Church, and there were 95 individuals (or about 3.48% of the population) who belonged to another Christian church. There were 2 individuals (or about 0.07% of the population) who were Jewish, and 59 (or about 2.16% of the population) who were Islamic. There were 3 individuals who were Buddhist and 2 individuals who belonged to another church. 167 (or about 6.11% of the population) belonged to no church, are agnostic or atheist, and 56 individuals (or about 2.05% of the population) did not answer the question.

== Education ==
In Courroux about 1,134 or (41.5%) of the population have completed non-mandatory upper secondary education, and 216 or (7.9%) have completed additional higher education (either university or a Fachhochschule). Of the 216 who completed tertiary schooling, 65.7% were Swiss men, 21.8% were Swiss women, 9.3% were non-Swiss men and 3.2% were non-Swiss women.

The Canton of Jura school system provides two year of non-obligatory Kindergarten, followed by six years of Primary school. This is followed by three years of obligatory lower Secondary school where the students are separated according to ability and aptitude. Following the lower Secondary students may attend a three or four year optional upper Secondary school followed by some form of Tertiary school or they may enter an apprenticeship.

During the 2009-10 school year, there were a total of 327 students attending 17 classes in Courroux. There were 4 kindergarten classes with a total of 86 students in the municipality. The municipality had 13 primary classes and 241 students. There are only nine Secondary schools in the canton, so all the students from Courroux attend their secondary school in another municipality. As of 2000, there were 4 students in Courroux who came from another municipality, while 213 residents attended schools outside the municipality.

== Crime ==
In 2014 the crime rate, of the over 200 crimes listed in the Swiss Criminal Code (running from murder, robbery and assault to accepting bribes and election fraud), in Courroux was 40 per thousand residents. This rate is lower than average, at only 68.7% of the rate in the district and 61.9% of the average rate in the entire country. During the same period, the rate of drug crimes was 0.6 per thousand residents, which is only 19.4% of the rate in the district, 15.8% of the rate in the canton and is only 6.1% of the national rate. The rate of violations of immigration, visa and work permit laws was 1.9 per thousand residents. This rate is lower than average, only 61.3% of the rate in the district, 70.4% of the rate in the canton and only 38.8% of the rate for the entire country.

== Personalities ==
- Philippe Decourroux, singer
