= Crime-lite =

Light source for forensic investigations

The Crime-lite is a handheld, high-intensity alternative light source used primarily by forensic investigators to detect evidence such as fingerprints, bodily fluids and latent evidence from crime scenes.

The Crime-lite was one of the first commercially available alternative light sources to benefit from LED technology. LED light sources offer many advantages over previous technologies including durability and lifespan.

There are several models of Crime-lite currently available including the Crime-lite 2, 82, ML, XL, and 8x4.

Recent advances in the power and spread of light from LED bulbs means that LED light sources are now able to offer a valid alternative to laser and xenon arc products.

Crime-lites are used by police, security and military forces worldwide.
