= History of Bernese Jura =

History of the French-speaking region in the Canton of Bern

The History of Bernese Jura covers the territory of the former Bishopric of Basel since its unification with the Canton of Bern in 1815.

Until the creation of the Canton of Jura in 1978, the term "Bernese Jura" designated the territory of the former Bishopric of Basel united with the canton of Bern in 1815, with the exception of the city of Bienne. Subsequently, the term referred to the three French-speaking districts that remained Bernese—La Neuveville, Moutier, and Courtelary—while Laufen (in the Canton of Basel-Country since 1994) was considered a special entity. Since the reform of the Bernese administration which came into force in 2010, organizing the canton into five administrative regions and ten administrative districts, the districts of Courtelary, La Neuveville, and Moutier form the administrative region of the Bernese Jura and the administrative district of the same name.

The district included 49 communes at its creation, 40 in 2015 following mergers, and 39 from 2026 after the attachment of the commune of Moutier to the canton of Jura. This transfer resulted in the suppression of the district of Moutier, as well as the repeal of the term "district" in the Bernese Constitution (articles 3 and 84).

== From the Act of Union to the creation of the canton of Jura (1815-1978) ==
=== Population ===
The Bernese Jura had approximately 57,700 inhabitants in 1818, 116,000 in 1910, and 140,000 in 1970. Its demographic weight within the canton of Bern reached a maximum of 19% in 1888, then fell back to 14% in 1970. The population movement is characterized by strong emigration of Jurassians, partially compensated by Swiss immigration (mostly Bernese) in the 19th century, and foreign immigration in the 20th century (3% foreigners in 1950, 14% in 1970). The demographic mixing was not the same in the North Jura (66% Jurassians in 1970) as in the South Jura (38%).

In the six French-speaking districts, the proportion of German speakers, which exceeded 20% at the end of the 19th century, regressed to 16% in 1960. On the confessional level, the Protestant minority was reinforced in the 19th century, but the border between the Catholic Jura and the Protestant Jura hardly blurred despite the strengthening of diasporas on both sides (Catholicism, Protestantism). The rate of urbanization remained low: in 1850, only 11 communes exceeded 1,000 inhabitants, 35 in 1910, and 39 out of 145 in 1970, but only five of them counted between 5,000 and 12,000 inhabitants.

=== Institutional framework ===
According to the Actes de réunion (1815), the Jura was in the same state of dependence to the urban patriciate as the Bernese countryside, but it retained the tax system inherited from the French regime: the land tax instituted to replace feudal charges. Under the Restoration, the Jura (German: Leberberg) was divided into five bailiwicks (leberbergische Ämter), called districts from 1831: Porrentruy, Delémont (with Laufen), the Franches-Montagnes, Moutier, and Courtelary. La Neuveville and the Tessenberg were attached to that of Cerlier.

The liberal constitution of 1831, which recognized French as a national language, and the radical constitution of 1846, which maintained Jurassian particularism (land tax, French legislation, public assistance), were widely approved by the Jurassians. But they massively rejected that of 1893 and the law on public assistance and settlement of 1897 which put an end to the special regime of the Jura in legislative, fiscal, and social matters. From 1848 to 1890, the Jura formed a federal electoral district, divided into South Jura (Courtelary, Franches-Montagnes, Moutier, La Neuveville) and North Jura (Delémont, Laufon, Porrentruy) from 1890 to 1918. With the introduction of proportional representation (1919), the canton of Bern formed a single electoral district, but the parties generally presented separate and related lists for the Jura and the old canton.

Divided since 1846 into seven districts, the Jura counted 147 communes (146 in 1882, 145 in 1952). In 1815, the Act of Union abolished the French communal organization and re-established the bourgeoisies. It reintroduced the distinction between burgesses and inhabitants. The Constitution of 1831 and the law on communes of 1833 organized the municipal commune but guaranteed the bourgeois communes the ownership of their property. The classification of communal property in the 1860s shared the public wealth of the communes. In rural regions, the mixed commune was established, with a single council administering the political commune and managing the bourgeoisie property. In 1869, there were 79 mixed communes and 68 municipal communes, as well as 75 bourgeois communes or sections. Apart from some local adjustments, this structure has been maintained until today.

=== Political life ===
In the 19th century, currents of opinion first crystallized around a man and a newspaper before being structured into political parties: Xavier Stockmar and L'Helvétie embodied the liberalism of 1830; Joseph Trouillat with Le Réveil du Jura (1860), then Ernest Daucourt with Le Pays (1873) were the champions of Catholic conservatism; Le Jura bernois (1867) of Saint-Imier and Le Démocrate (1877) of Delémont were the mouthpieces of the Jurassian Popular Association, ancestor of the Liberal-Radical Party. The relations between the Church and the State were at the heart of political struggles between the liberal-radicals ("Reds") and conservatives ("Blacks").

The Catholic Conservative Party, founded in 1877, became the Christian Democratic Party (PDC) of the Jura in 1971 (The Centre from 2021). The Jurassian Federation founded at the time of the First International, then the rise of labor unionism in watchmaking favored the birth of the Jurassian Socialist Party at the beginning of the 20th century. In 1919, the new Party of Peasants, Artisans and Burghers (PAB; since 1971 Swiss People's Party) of Bern rallied a fraction of the Jurassian rural world. With proportional representation, the power relations stabilized: the liberal-radicals, with the most balanced geographical implantation, and the conservatives, thanks to their pre-eminence in the Catholic Jura, each gathered a third of the electorate. These four parties resisted well to the emergence of new formations: independent Christian-socials (PCSI) from 1957, Labor Party (POP) from 1967. But socialists and liberal-radicals were deeply divided by the Jurassian question.

=== Economy ===
In 1815, the Jura was largely agricultural. In a region where medium mountain conditions predominated, the peasantry had turned toward livestock and the dairy industry. The Tête de Moine cheese and the Franches-Montagnes horse became its emblematic products. From the mid-19th century, an agricultural associative movement developed. Vocational training was favored by the opening of the cantonal school of agriculture founded in Porrentruy in 1897 and transferred to Courtemelon (in Courtételle) in 1927. The iron industry, heir to the forges of the prince-bishops of Basel, experienced a flourishing period between 1850 and 1860 (six blast furnaces in activity), then a rapid decline. After the buyout of ruined companies around 1880, the Von Roll company concentrated production in two foundries—Choindez and Les Rondez—and abandoned mining in 1926.

Watchmaking dominated the Jurassian economy from the 19th century. After an extensive development under the établissage regime in the Saint-Imier valley, the Franches-Montagnes, and the Ajoie, under the effect of the industrial revolution, it settled in the valleys served by the train where the new factories settled, attracting labor: peasant watchmakers at home gave way to factory workers. Longines in Saint-Imier (1866) and Tavannes Watch Co. (1891) had an exceptional size in an industrial landscape where small and medium enterprises predominated. In Moutier, watchmaking gave birth in 1880 to the precision machinery industry, flourishing in the 20th century despite some crises: Tornos, Bechler (Tornos-Bechler), Pétermann. In Ajoie, the Burrus tobacco factory in Boncourt, then the hosiery and the manufacture of shoes in Porrentruy and its surroundings found a place next to the dominant watchmaking. The Wenger cutlery of Delémont and the Condor cycle factory of Courfaivre were founded in 1893. Laufen turned toward the paper, cement, and ceramics industries.

=== Transportation and Communications ===
The topography of the country made internal and external links difficult. In 1815, the road network included two main axes: Basel-Bienne, through the Birse valley and Pierre-Pertuis, and Tavannes-Porrentruy, through Les Rangiers. During the construction of railways in Switzerland, the Jura was left aside. Thanks to the commitment of Jurassian notables and local communities and after the annexation of Alsace-Lorraine by Germany, which cut the link between Paris and Switzerland through Basel, the Delle-Porrentruy-Delémont, Bienne-Basel through the Tavannes valley, and Sonceboz-Les Convers lines were built from 1872 to 1877. The rise of watchmaking favored the construction, between 1884 and 1913, of regional lines operated by private companies which merged within the Jurassian Railway Company in 1945. Moutier was linked to Solothurn in 1908; the Moutier-Granges tunnel, on the Paris-Milan axis via the Lötschberg, opened in 1916, lost its importance when Alsace became French again.

With the development of automobile traffic, road links became a major concern. From the 1960s, the construction of a Boncourt-Oensingen highway ("Transjurane"), linking the French and Swiss networks, was claimed by the Jurassian population. Linked to the development of communications, the defense of regional interests was taken over by two associations. In 1903, the foundation of the Jurassian Society of Development, Pro Jura since 1938, marked the desire to attract Swiss and foreign tourism. The Association for the Defense of the Interests of the Jura (ADIJ), constituted in 1925, is concerned with the development of communications as well as economic and social problems.

=== Society and Associative Life ===
Since the end of the 19th century, the agricultural society has gradually given way to a majority salaried population in a very decentralized industry. Relatively dispersed, the working world has never succeeded in challenging the domination of the local and regional small bourgeoisie. Significant in this regard was the social composition of the Jurassian deputation to the Bernese Grand Council (1922–1974): three quarters independent, one quarter salaried. The workers in watchmaking (since 1886) and metallurgy (around 1900) organized themselves in unions grouped in 1915 within the Union of Industry, Construction and Services. It was widely majoritarian within the Jurassian Union Cartel which, since 1930, gathered the regional sections of the federations of the Swiss Trade Union Federation.

From 6,700 in 1917, their numbers exceeded 15,000 members in 1963. Christian unionism remained very minority, even in the Catholic districts. Apart from the large associations—the Société jurassienne d'émulation, founded in 1847, Pro Jura and the ADIJ—associative life developed, especially from the mid-19th century, according to two types of formal sociability: in the villages, it was limited to music, singing, shooting societies, and agricultural associations, while in urbanized localities appeared, alongside them, from the last quarter of the 19th century, provident and philanthropic societies, professional and sports associations.

=== Church and Religious Life ===
The Act of Union guarantees the exercise of the Catholic and Protestant religions in the communes where they were practiced; the cult of the Anabaptists was tolerated. The Protestant parishes dependent on the four Napoleonic consistorial churches were incorporated into the Bernese Church, the pastors of the Jura forming a particular class; the Catholic part, attached to the diocese of Strasbourg under the French regime, was attached again, in 1814, to that of Basel reorganized in 1828. The Constitution of 1831 proclaimed freedom of belief and that of 1846 freedom of worship, but recognized two national Churches. In February 1836, the adoption by the Grand Council of Bern of the Baden Articles intended to regulate the relations between the Church and the State, provoked popular effervescence in the Catholic Jura. But the Grand Council of Bern had to back down under pressure from France.

The antagonism between Catholic circles and the Bernese cantonal power reached its climax during the Kulturkampf. The deposition of the Jurassian bishop Eugène Lachat, the measures of repression against the clergy solidary with the bishop, the law of 1874 on the organization of worship, with the institution of a Christian-Catholic Church, provoked the resistance of the Jurassian Catholic community which appealed to the Confederation. A calming occurred in 1878, but it took half a century to eliminate all the sequels of the Kulturkampf. The law on the organization of worship of 1945 was accepted by a narrow margin thanks to the massive vote of the Jurassians. Since the Second World War, the ecumenical movement brought closer the Protestant Synod of the Jura and the Catholic Church, very active in social aid and cultural and spiritual animation.

=== School and Cultural Institutions ===
The Act of Union gave back to the ecclesiastical authorities the communal primary schools, attended only from November to April, and the two secondary schools (the old college of Porrentruy and that of Delémont founded in 1812). From 1831, the liberal State attached itself to organizing the school system: law on public primary schools of 1835, laws on the organization of public instruction and on secondary schools in 1856, law on primary education of 1894, etc. Partisans of secular education and tenants of the confessional school clashed on legislation, on the status of the normal schools of Porrentruy (1837) and Delémont (1846), of the cantonal school of Porrentruy (1858), and on the question of teaching sisters (1849, 1867/1868).

In the 19th century, some 70 private or communal German schools welcomed the children of German-speaking immigrant families; they were only six in 1968, following the application of the principle of territoriality of languages. In the 20th century, school peace established, a decentralization allowed an autonomous organization of the French-speaking school. From 1847, the literary, scientific, and artistic elite met within the Société jurassienne d'émulation. The Jurassian Institute of Sciences, Letters and Arts (1950) groups writers, artists, and university professors and the Popular University (1957) dispenses many decentralized courses in the perspective of permanent education.

== The Jurassian Question ==
=== Origins to the 1959 Vote ===
From the 19th century, the minority problem born from the union of the former episcopal principality of Basel to the canton of Bern, in which the Jurassian people found themselves in a state of political dependence, was called the "Jurassian question." This paradoxical situation in a federalist Switzerland could only last if the Jurassian minority did not feel bullied, or even threatened in its existence. The annexation to Bern was first accepted as a lesser evil. The separatist claim appeared occasionally in the 19th century, more often with the attempts at Germanization at the beginning of the 20th century. Toward the end of the First World War, the Jurassian question was relaunched by a handful of intellectuals wishing the creation of a canton of Jura. If it aroused a strong anti-separatist reaction, the Separatist Committee of 1917 ran out of steam quickly.

In the interwar period, the demographic decline and the economic difficulties sharpened the feeling that "Jurassian interests" were ignored by Bern, while poets, historians, and writers felt the need to affirm their identity, based on language and history. The Jurassian Society of Emulation, Pro Jura and the ADIJ were representative of a regional bourgeoisie of liberal tendency, formed of professors, magistrates, officials, business leaders, and political leaders, who contributed largely to shaping the Jurassian identity. It was these three large associations that, in June 1943, presented the claims of the Jura (the "Jurassian malaise") to the Bernese government and took the head of the Moutier Committee in 1947, before being overwhelmed by the separatist movement, the driving force of a new generation.

Analysts of the Jurassian question often situate its origin in September 1947 and attribute it to the Moeckli affair, when the Bernese Grand Council refused to entrust the Jurassian state councilor Georges Moeckli with the Department of Public Works under the pretext that he was French-speaking. The Moutier Committee was constituted following this incident and the sharp protests it aroused in the Jura. Its initial objective was to obtain a broad status of autonomy, in the form of a federalist and bicameral system in the canton of Bern. The Bernese State excluding any challenge to cantonal unity, the Committee abandoned its autonomist claim and finally rallied to a compromise solution: the constitutional recognition of the "Jurassian people," adopted in popular vote on October 29, 1950.

This measure was judged insufficient by separatist activists who, by appropriating the doctrinal heritage of the Moutier Committee, organized themselves from November 1947 within the Jurassian Separatist Movement, which transformed into the Rassemblement jurassien (RJ) four years later, under the impetus of its two main leaders, Roland Béguelin and Roger Schaffter. Shortly after the dissolution of the Moutier Committee (November 13, 1952), anti-separatist circles founded the Union des patriotes jurassiens (UPJ). During the 1950s, the conflict between the two rival movements focused essentially on Jurassian history, guarantor in the eyes of the RJ of a multi-secular autonomy lost in 1792, and on the economic dimensions of the Jurassian question which, according to the UPJ, constituted the main obstacle to independence.

In September 1957, the RJ launched a cantonal initiative intended to make known the aspirations of the Jurassian population regarding the creation of a canton of Jura. The vote took place on July 5, 1959. The initiative was rejected very widely by the old canton. In the Jura, a narrow majority of 52% emerged in favor of the status quo. For the RJ, this score constituted a failure, especially because it invalidated its thesis of the unity of the "Jurassian people." Indeed, while the three French-speaking and Catholic districts of North Jura showed themselves very majoritarian in favor of separatism, the three southern districts, Protestant and French-speaking, as well as the district of Laufon, Catholic and German-speaking, showed very comfortable loyalist majorities. This scrutiny led the RJ to gradually reorient its policy, basing it henceforth on an "ethnic" conception no longer considered in its historical sense, but in its linguistic dimension. This operation allowed it to challenge the results of the 1959 vote, distorted according to it by the intervention of German-speaking immigrants in the Jura, and to renounce the German-speaking district of Laufen.

=== The Plebiscites and the Separation ===
In the 1960s, the tone hardened. The RJ reorganized and intensified its presence. Founded in December 1963, the Bélier (youth organization) became the driving force of the fight. A Jurassian Liberation Front then claimed various attacks and, in 1964, the federal councilor Paul Chaudet was heckled at Les Rangiers by several thousand separatist protesters. Despite compromise attempts, the positions remained very entrenched, all the more so since the Bernese government remained firmly attached to the principle of cantonal unity. It backed down however in 1967 and proposed a plan of measures which resulted, on March 1, 1970, in the adoption in popular vote of a constitutional addendum determining the modalities of a procedure of self-determination in the Jura.

In this context, the Bernese Executive Council fixed the date of the first plebiscite to June 23, 1974. Against all expectations, the consultation showed a narrow separatist majority in the whole of the Jura, although the divisions observed in 1959 were globally confirmed (36,802 yes against 34,057 no). The anti-separatist reaction was reinforced by thousands of women of the Female Grouping of Force démocratique and the young people of the Sanglier group. On March 16, 1975, the southern districts maintained their membership in the canton of Bern. The following September 7 and 14, a third vote sanctioned some border adjustments. The city of Moutier narrowly maintained an anti-separatist majority. On September 14, the district of Laufon voted to remain in the canton of Bern but kept the possibility of joining a neighboring canton.

In northern Jura, a Constituent Assembly was elected and proceeded to set up the fundamental institutions of the new canton, whose sovereignty was recognized during the federal vote of September 24, 1978. In southern Jura, tension remained sharp until the beginning of the 1980s, then the political climate tended to normalize. The confrontation shifted to local elections and, in 1982, the city of Moutier overturned the anti-separatist majority. The district of Laufon rejected in 1983 in popular vote its attachment to Basel-Country. But the Bernese State was accused of having financed the anti-separatist camp. Seized of the file, the Federal Court confirmed the plebiscites of South Jura, but quashed the Laufen scrutiny. The district then decided on November 12, 1989, on its attachment to the canton of Basel-Country.

Relaunched by these events, the Jurassian question rebounded with the publication, on March 31, 1993, of the report of the Widmer Commission, which called for dialogue and defined the main lines of a procedure with a view to reunification. This led to a tripartite agreement signed on March 25, 1994, which aimed to settle the conflict through the creation of an Inter-Jurassian Assembly (AIJ). Parallel to the promotion of dialogue regarding their common future, the AIJ had the task of favoring collaboration between the Bernese Jura and the canton of Jura through common institutions. Thanks to this agreement, the Bernese Executive Council admitted the existence of a community of interests between the two parts of the region.

== From Separation to Special Status ==
The Bernese Jura was reduced on January 1, 1979, due to the formation of the canton of Jura, to the districts of Courtelary, Moutier, and La Neuveville. It henceforth only had the right to one state councilor instead of two. It counted 53,768 inhabitants in 2017. The population consisted of 82.3% French speakers and 10.8% German speakers in 2000, respectively 85.8% and 12.8% in 2014–2016. In 1977, the future Bernese Jura adopted a regional structure, the Federation of Communes of the Bernese Jura (FJB). This was to officially exercise the rights of cooperation inscribed in the Bernese cantonal legislation to facilitate the integration of the region. But integration as well as the formation of a regional identity clashed with the persistence of a strong separatist minority.

The anti-separatists, grouped in Force démocratique, in the Swiss People's Party (UDC), the Radical-Democratic Party (PRD) or the Socialist Party (PS) obtained nine seats in the cantonal legislative elections from 1982 to 2002. As for the separatists, they only gathered 21 to 29% of the votes and three seats; they receded slightly with time, except in some communes, like Moutier, where they won the majority. The incapacity of the FJB to reconcile divergent interests called for legislative reforms. The new Bernese Constitution of 1993 guarantees the special status of the Bernese Jura. In 1994, the FJB was dissolved and gave way to a Regional Council of the Bernese Jura and French-speaking Bienne (Bernese Jura Council since 2006), charged with cooperation at the cantonal level, formed of deputies and prefects, and to a Conference of Mayors of the Bernese Jura and Bienne (Conference of Mayors of the Bernese Jura and of the bilingual district of Bienne since 2007), charged with collaboration on the regional level.

The turn of 1993–1994 in the Jurassian question calmed the tension revived since 1984 between separatists and anti-separatists. The attachment of Vellerat to the canton of Jura, very clearly approved by the Swiss people on March 10, 1996, also calmed minds: this commune, separatist since the plebiscites, had been unable to join the new canton for reasons both formal and political. A report commissioned by the Bernese government on the situation of the French-speakers in the canton of Bern, which proposed a progressive autonomy for the Bernese Jura and a relativization of borders, increased the interest of the authorities for an active policy toward minorities. From 1997, the Avenir group, formed of separatists and anti-separatists, campaigned for a greater autonomy of the region within the canton of Bern.

In 2002, the Bernese Executive Council presented a decree defining the special status it intended to give to the Bernese Jura. The law governing this new status was adopted by the Grand Council in 2004. Entering into force on January 1, 2006, the special status of the Bernese Jura provides for a Bernese Jura Council of 24 members, elected for four years by universal suffrage and proportional representation (3 seats for the district of La Neuveville, allocation of other seats to those of Moutier and Courtelary, according to the population figure for the other two districts; in 2006, 11 for Moutier and 10 for Courtelary). The Council, which is primarily the interlocutor of the cantonal government and its administration, possesses certain decision-making powers in the cultural and school domains and the right to give its opinion and issue proposals on subjects directly of interest to the Bernese Jura.

After 1978, the FJB supported the foundation of regional societies (notably for the public economy, tourism, social assistance, local radios) which sought to supplant the old Jurassian associations from the Bernese Jura. The economy suffered for a long time from the effects of the watchmaking crisis of the mid-1970s. Foreign groups bought many local companies. Included in the network of national roads in 1984 and completed in 2017, the Transjurane (A16) links the cantons of Bern (from Bienne) and Jura (to Boncourt), passing through Moutier. The piercing of the Pierre-Pertuis Tunnel (Tavannes-Sonceboz), in 1997, was an important stage of its construction.

The reunification project was submitted to popular vote in 2013 but was rejected by the three districts of the Bernese Jura (71.8% no), while the canton of Jura approved it widely (76.6% yes). In the Bernese Jura, Moutier was an exception by accepting it with 55% yes. Thus, in 2017, Moutier decided to join the canton of Jura. Following appeals, the vote was invalidated then confirmed by a repetition of the vote on March 28, 2021, where the population renewed its choice by 54.9% yes. The Concordat regulating the transfer of Moutier, approved by the cantonal executives in 2023 and the cantonal parliaments in 2024, entered into force in 2026.
