= SBB RABDe 500 =

Swiss high-speed train

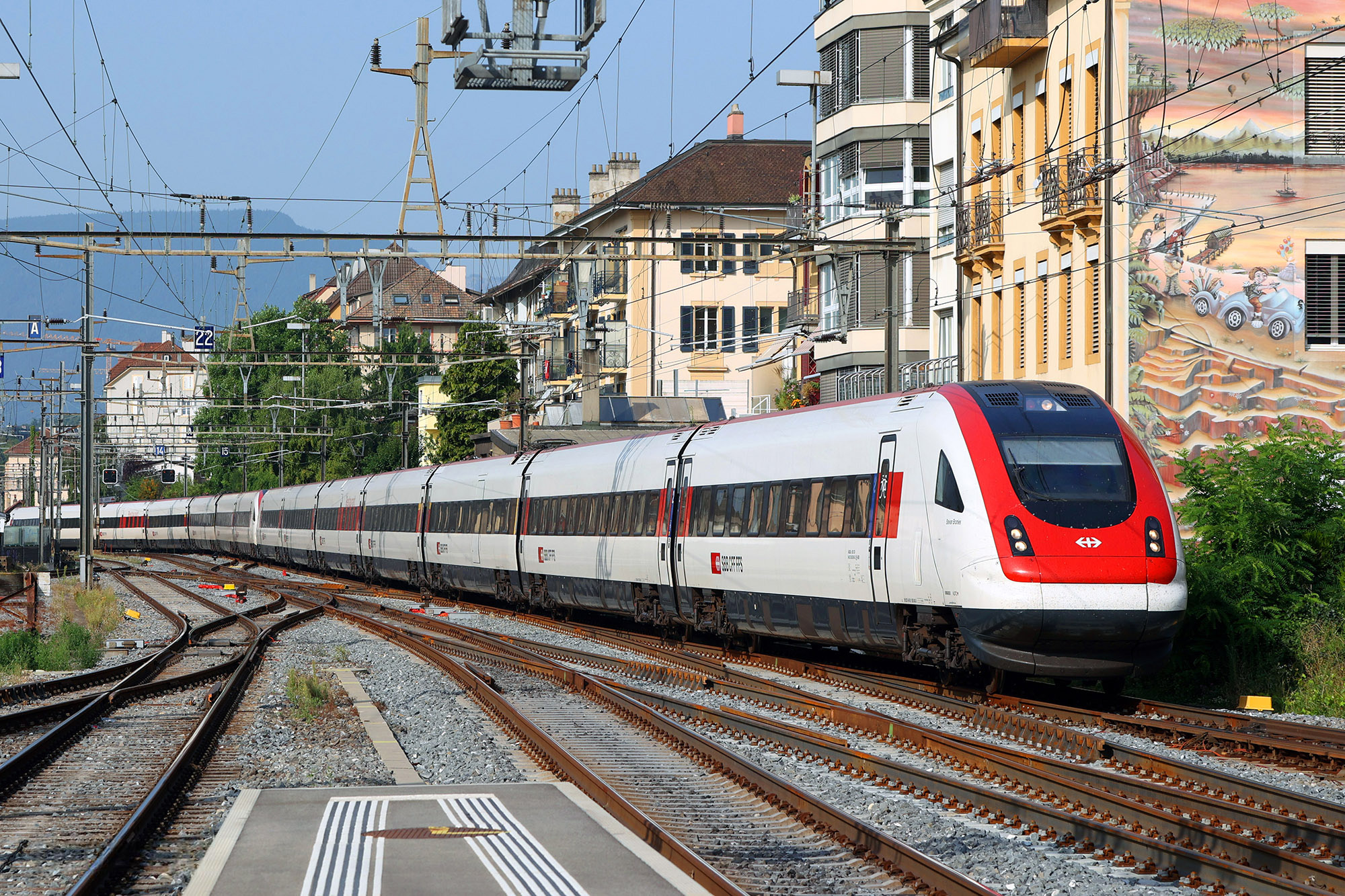
- A RABDe 500 trainset in 2025

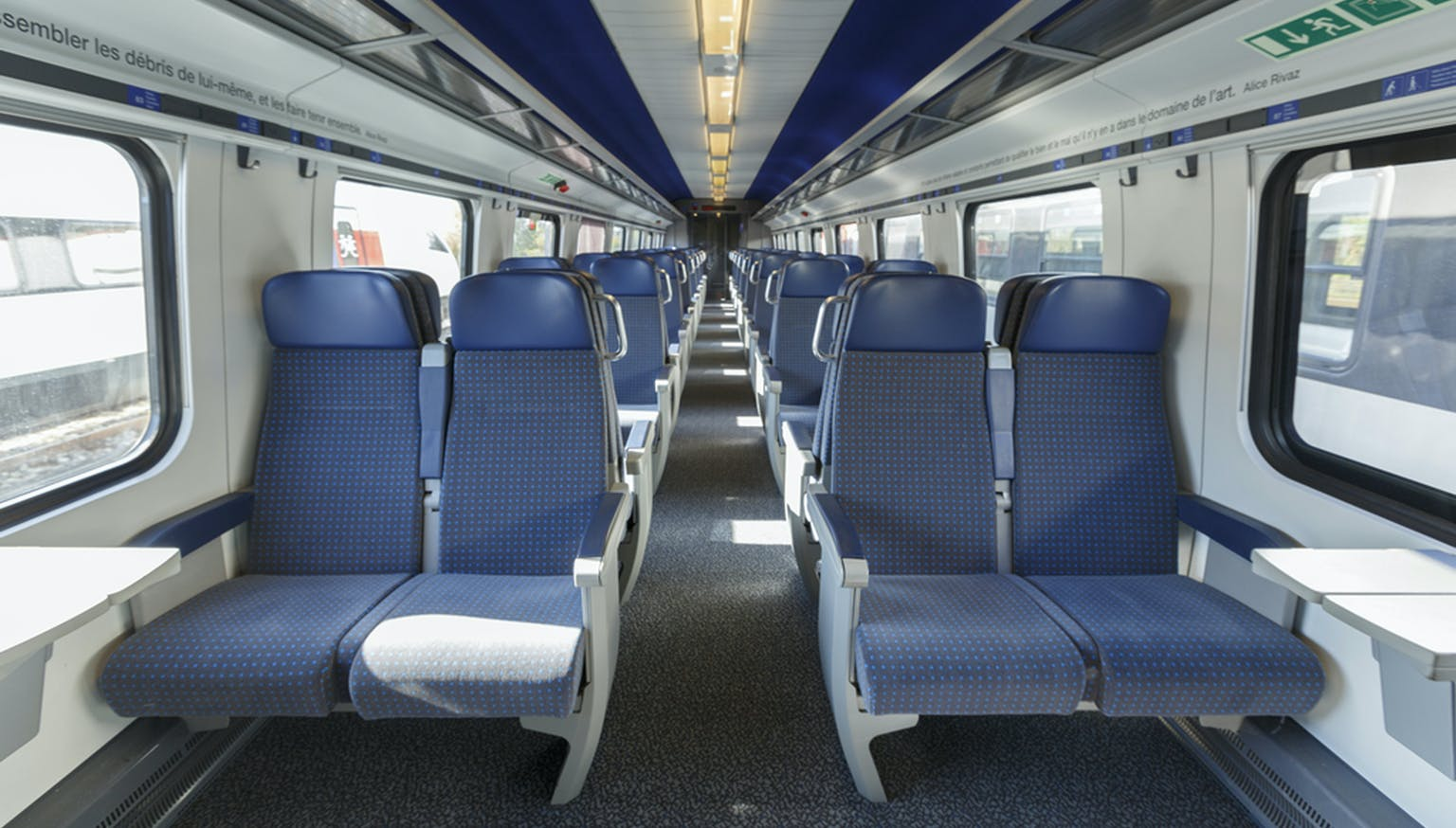
- Inside view of the ICN second class corridor
- In service: 2000–present
- Manufacturer: Adtranz
- Designer: Pininfarina
- Number built: 44
- Number in service: 44
- Formation: 7 cars
- Fleet numbers: 500 000–500 043
- Capacity: 470
- Owners: Swiss Federal Railways

Specifications
- Train length: 188,800 mm (619 ft 5 in)
- Maximum speed: 200 km/h (125 mph)
- Weight: 355 t (349 long tons; 391 short tons)
- Power output: 5,200 kW (7,000 hp)
- Electric system(s): 15 kV 16.7 Hz AC

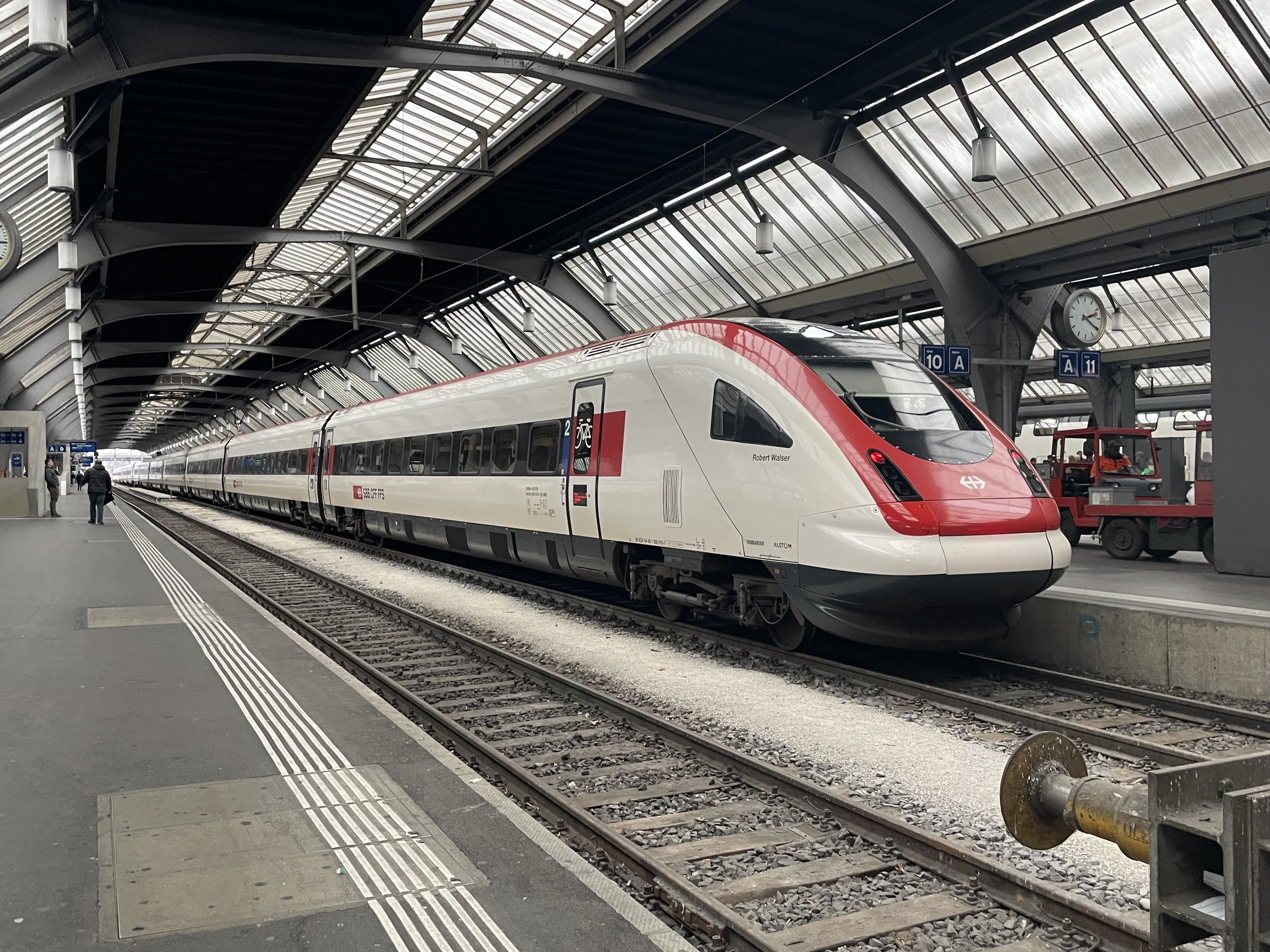
ICN Double Set (Robert Walser facing buffers) stationed at Zurich HB Platform 10

The SBB RABDe 500, also known as the ICN, (Note: German: Intercity-Neigezug, lit. 'intercity tilting train') is a Swiss high speed passenger EMU, which was introduced in 2000, in time for Expo.02 held in western Switzerland in 2002. Its maximum speed is 200 km/h (125 mph), and it employs tilting technology, which allows it to travel through curvy routes faster than non-tilting trains. The train sets were a joint development by Bombardier, Swiss Federal Railways and Alstom, with an aerodynamic body designed by Pininfarina, bogies and tilting mechanism designed by the then SIG, Schweizerische Industrie Gesellschaft.

Forty-four RABDe 500 trains with a total of 308 coaches were delivered to SBB-CFF-FFS between 1999 and 2005. The RABDe 500 often run with two complete compositions, each with seven carriages and a seating capacity of 480, both including a dining car. The outer four of the seven carriages are second class.

== History ==
Swiss Federal Railways ordered an initial 24 7-car trainsets in 1996 at a cost of CHF 500 million. The contract went to a consortium including Adtranz, Schindler Waggon, and Fiat-SIG. Pininfarina designed the vehicle body. The trains were intended for use on the Jura Foot Line; adopting tilting technology allowed SBB to defer track upgrades over the route.

The first trainsets entered service on the 28 May 2000 timetable change, running from St. Gallen via Winterthur, Zürich and Biel/Bienne to Lausanne. All 24 trainsets were in service by the opening of the Expo.02 national exposition in May 2002. The trains all carried the slogan "enable the future" (French: Permettre le futur).

SBB ordered another 10 trainsets, with an option for 10 more, in June 2001. SBB exercised the option that December, for a total of 20 additional transets at CHF 420 million. Delivery was complete by 2005.

Formerly, SBB designated intercity services operated by the SBB RABDe 500 as "ICN", differentiating them from other InterCity (IC) and InterRegio (IR) services. This practice ceased with the December 2017 timetable changes, in which all IC and IR services gained numbers and the ICN category was eliminated. RABDe 500-operated services are indicated on timetables and mobile applications by the "TT" label.

All 44 trainsets were refurbished between 2012 and 2019, an overhaul taking 25 days per train. Another overhaul, taking place between 2021 and 2029, will replace the interiors and improve mobile phone reception.

As of the December 2024 timetable change, the RABDe 500 is primarily used on two InterCity routes and one InterRegio route: the IC 5, running from Lausanne to Rorschach or Zürich HB; the IC 51, running from Basel SBB to Biel/Bienne; and the IR 57 running from Geneva Airport to Neuchâtel.

== Design ==
Each formation is composed of seven cars. The first two and last two cars in the trainset are the second class cars, and have the traction motors and powered axles. The three middle cars carry first class seating; the third car is split between first class and the restaurant car. The formation is 188,800 mm (619 ft 5 in) long and weighs 355 t (349 long tons; 391 short tons). The car body is a monocoque design built out of aluminium.

The RABDe 500 can tilt at a maximum of 8 degrees. Eight 650-kilowatt (870 hp) traction motors produce 5,200 kilowatts (7,000 hp); the train can travel at a maximum speed of 200 kilometres per hour (125 mph). On routes with a significant number of curves, the tilting technology could reduce travel times by 10–20%. For example, on the Lausanne–St. Gallen route, the introduction of the trains shortened travel times by 15 minutes.

In 2015–2016, eighteen trainsets were adapted for operation in the Gotthard Base Tunnel. Changes included improved fire detection equipment, cab signaling upgrades, and improvements to heating and cooling. This was a temporary measure until newer non-tilting trains SBB RABe 501 (Giruno) trains became available.

== Naming ==
All forty-four RABDe 500 trains are named, mostly after famous Swiss scholars, artists, writers, politicians, engineers, and architects. Each train bears the portrait of its namesake, painted by Bernese painter Martin Fivian, in the third car (first class and restaurant).

List of names:

- 500 000 Le Corbusier
- 500 001 Jean Piaget
- 500 002 Annemarie Schwarzenbach
- 500 003 Madame de Staël
- 500 004 Mani Matter
- 500 005 Johann Heinrich Pestalozzi
- 500 006 Johanna Spyri
- 500 007 Albert Einstein
- 500 008 Vincenzo Vela
- 500 009 Friedrich Dürrenmatt
- 500 010 Robert Walser
- 500 011 Blaise Cendrars
- 500 012 Jean Rudolf von Salis
- 500 013 Denis de Rougemont
- 500 014 Max Frisch
- 500 015 Jean-Jacques Rousseau
- 500 016 Alice Rivaz
- 500 017 Willi Ritschard
- 500 018 Adolf Wölfli
- 500 019 Friedrich Glauser
- 500 020 Jeanne Hersch
- 500 021 Jeremias Gotthelf
- 500 022 Expo.02
- 500 023 Charles Ferdinand Ramuz
- 500 024 Ernest von Stockalper
- 500 025 Xavier Stockmar
- 500 026 Alfred Escher
- 500 027 Henry Dunant
- 500 028 Francesco Borromini
- 500 029 Eduard Spelterini
- 500 030 Louis Chevrolet
- 500 031 Louis Favre
- 500 032 Henry Dufaux
- 500 033 Gallus Jacob Baumgartner
- 500 034 Gustav Wenk
- 500 035 Niklaus Riggenbach
- 500 036 Minister Kern
- 500 037 Grock
- 500 038 Arthur Honegger
- 500 039 Auguste Piccard
- 500 040 Graf Zeppelin
- 500 041 William Barbey
- 500 042 Steivan Brunies
- 500 043 Harald Szeemann

== See also ==
- Train categories in Europe
- List of high-speed trains
- Swiss locomotive and railcar classification
