= Théodore Moeckli =

Swiss teacher and politician (1863–1952)

- Born: 4 September 1863; Le Landeron, Switzerland
- Died: 26 August 1952 (aged 88); La Neuveville, Switzerland
- Occupations: Teacher; school inspector; politician
- Spouse: Emma Schwarz (m. 1888)
- Children: Georges Moeckli
- Parents: Joseph Moeckli (father); Christina Käser (mother)

Théodore Moeckli (4 September 1863 – 26 August 1952) was a Swiss teacher and politician from La Neuveville in the Bernese Jura. He taught in La Neuveville until 1923 and was then a primary school inspector in the southern Jura. He was mayor of La Neuveville from 1917 to 1923 and a Free Democratic member of the National Council from 1919 to 1922. He did extensive public work in popular education.

== Biography ==
Théodore Moeckli was born on 4 September 1863 in Le Landeron, the son of Joseph Moeckli, a joiner and carpenter, and Christina Käser. In 1888 he married Emma Schwarz, daughter of Christian Schwarz, a teacher. His son was Georges Moeckli.

Moeckli went to school in La Neuveville and from 1881 to 1883 attended the teacher training college (Lehrerseminar) in Porrentruy. He taught in Le Fuet in 1883–1884 and then in La Neuveville until 1923. From 1923 to 1935 he was a primary school inspector in the southern Jura.

From 1917 to 1923 Moeckli was mayor (Stadtpräsident) of La Neuveville. From 1919 to 1922 he sat in the National Council for the Free Democrats; he resigned for professional reasons.

Moeckli did extensive public work in the field of popular education (Volksbildung). He founded the Foyer jurassien d'éducation in Delémont and presided over the Pedagogical Commission of the Bernese Jura. He worked with the Bernese Teachers' Association (Bernischer Lehrerverein), whose central committee he presided over from 1922 to 1924, and with the Bernese teachers' insurance fund (Bernische Lehrerversicherungskasse). From 1924 to 1939 he was president of the Union des chanteurs jurassiens. He died in La Neuveville on 26 August 1952.

== Bibliography ==
- Berner Schulblatt, 13 September 1952
- E. Gruner, Die schweizerische Bundesversammlung 1848–1920, 1, 1966, 200–201
- P. Scandola et al., Lehrerinnen und Lehrer zwischen Schule, Stand und Staat, 1992, 730
