= Lionel Friedli =

Swiss jazz percussionist

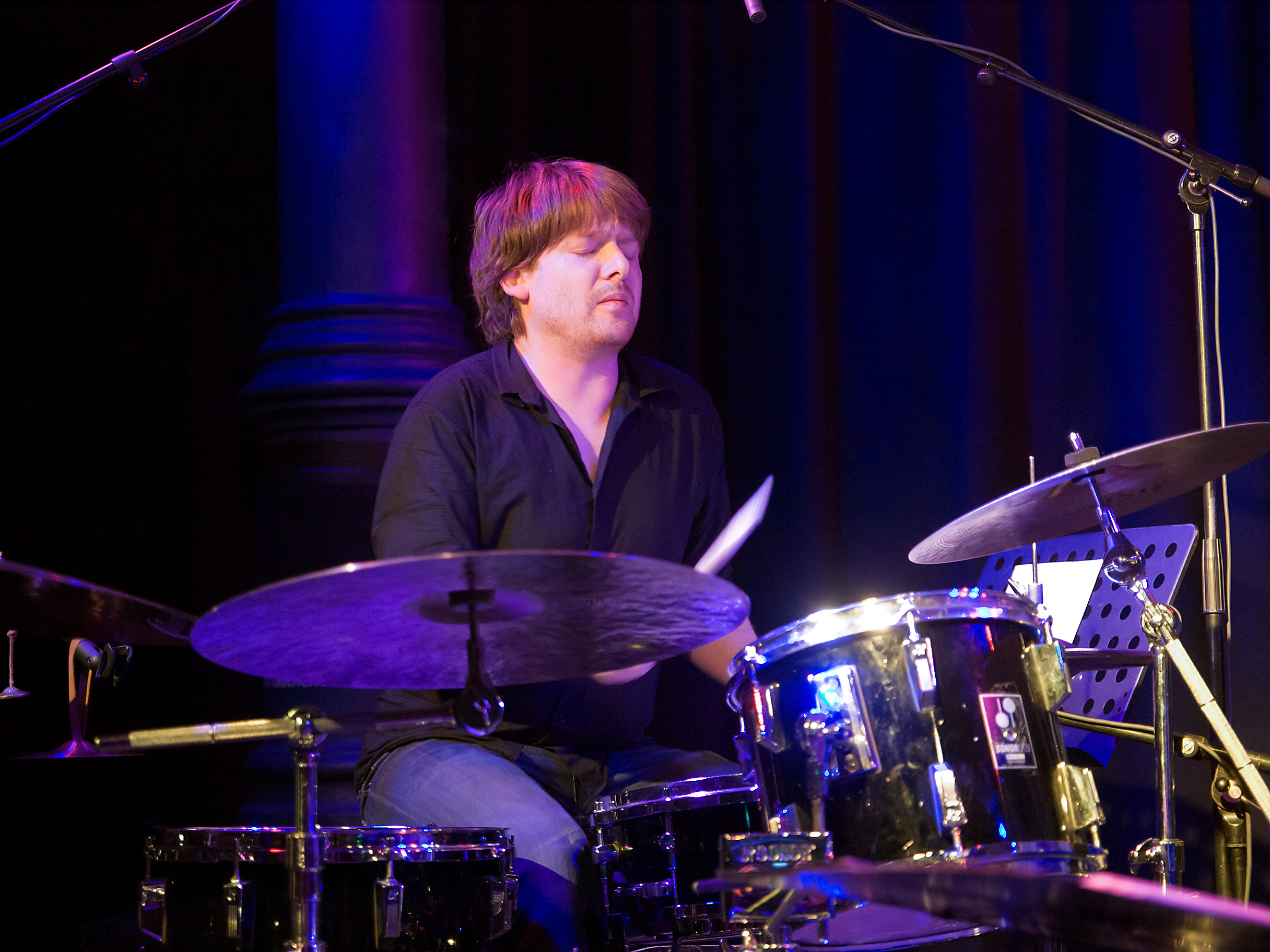
- Lionel Friedli in Jazzclub Unterfahrt in 2011
- Born: 1975 (age 50–51); Moutier, Switzerland
- Occupation: Percussionist
- Style: Jazz

Lionel Friedli (born 1975 in Moutier) is a Swiss jazz percussionist.

== Biography ==
Friedli grew up in Biel, received lessons at the Biel Conservatory, and studied at the Lucerne University of Applied Sciences and Arts with Norbert Pfammatter, graduating in 2005. From 1998 onwards, he worked with various artists, including his fellow student Lucien Dubois, with whom he made his first recordings in Lausanne (Sumo, 2000). He also collaborated with Manuel Mengis (Into the Barn, Hatology, 2004), Nicolas Masson, Vera Kappeler, Christoph Stiefel, and from 2013, Sarah Buechi. Additionally, he performed with Heiri Känzig, Marc Ribot, Colin Vallon, and Luzia von Wyl. Currently, his projects include working with Christy Doran’s New Bag, the group Elgar (with Hans Koch and Flo Stoffner), the Max Frankl Quartet, OZMO (featuring Vincent Membrez and Pedro Lenz), Merz feat. Sartorius Drum Ensemble, Laura Schuler’s quartet, and Whisperings (with Fred Frith). Together with drummers Christoph Steiner and Nicolas Wolf, he released the album Repercussive Cycles.

In the jazz genre, Friedli participated in 46 recording sessions between 2000 and 2021. In 2015, he was awarded the Jazz Prize by Fondation Suisa.
