= Paul-Otto Bessire =

Swiss historian (1880-1958)

Paul-Otto Bessire (21 April 1880 in Moutier – 6 September 1958) was a Swiss historian.

He studied at the Ecole normale in Porrentruy and at the universities of Basel and Bern.

Bessire taught high school in Moutier, and was then a professor at the Ecole cantonale in Porrentruy.

== Works ==
- Histoire du Jura bernois et de l'ancien Évêché de Bâle, Porrentruy, 1935
- Histoire du peuple suisses par le texte et par l'image, Moutier, 1940
- Berne et la Suisse: Histoire de leurs relations depuis les origines jusqu'à nos jours, Berne, 1953
- Le banneret: Pièce historique en 4 actes avec chants et musique, Bienne, 1927
- Le cerisier en fleurs, Lausanne, 1930
- La clairière enchantée: Nouvelles et légendes jurassiennes, Porrentruy, 1944
- Images de la Suisse, Berne, 1936
- Jacob-Henri Meister (1744-1826): Sa vie et ses œuvres, Delémont, 1912
- Léon Froidevaux 1876-1931 : Le musicien et le journaliste, Moutier, 1943
- Les origines de la Suisse et les communautés libres, Berne, 1938
- La question jurassienne, Porrentruy, 1919
- Le rôle des Suisses dans les troubles de l'Évêché de Bâle (1726-1740), Delémont, 1918
- Sous le ciel natal, poèmes, Tavannes, 1933
