= Jean-Claude Wicky =

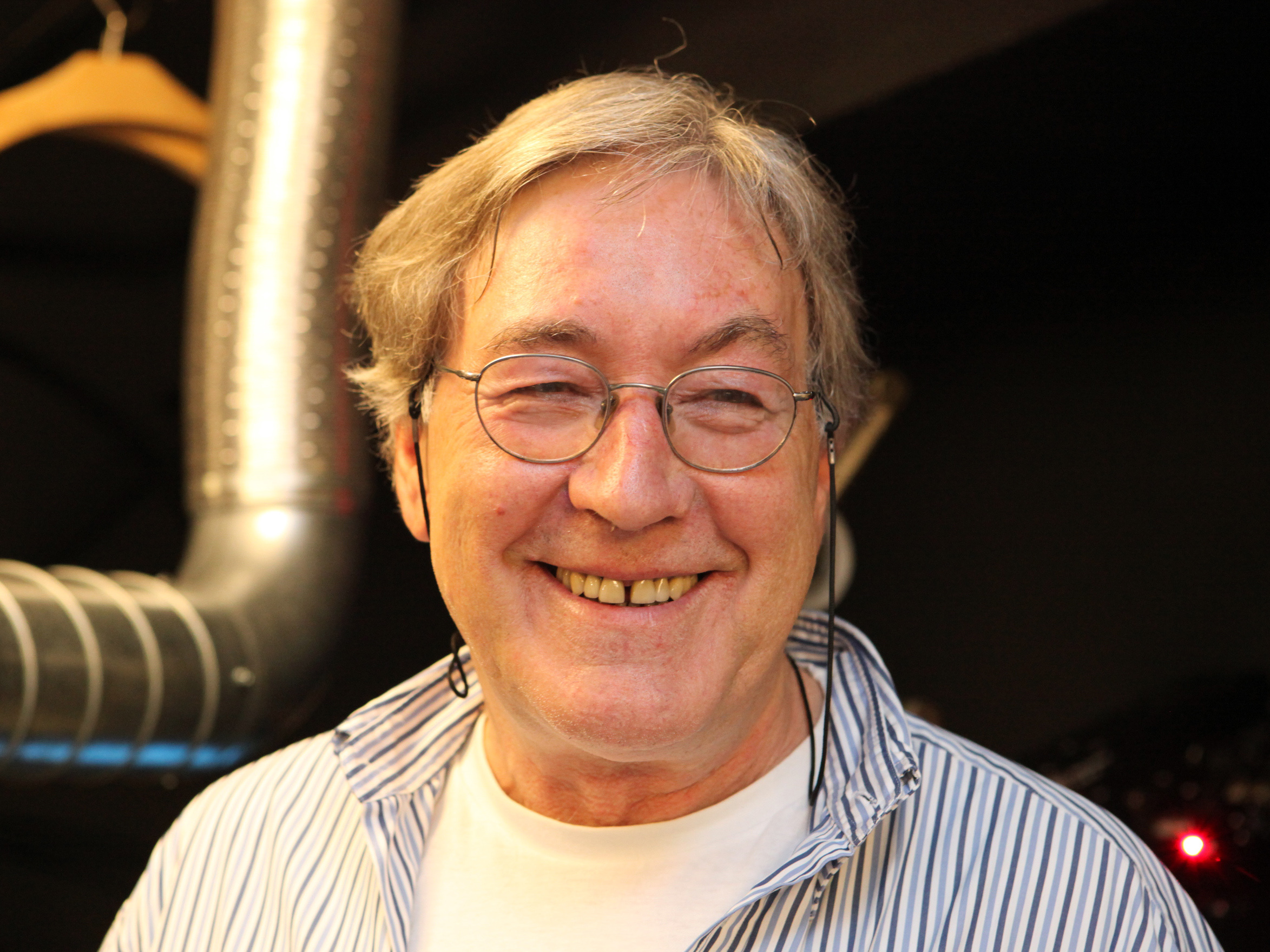
- Born: 28 January 1946 (age 80); Moutier, Switzerland
- Died: 31 July 2016; Biel/Bienne, Switzerland
- Occupation: Photographer

Jean-Claude Wicky (28 January 1946 – 31 July 2016) was a photographer noted for his series on Bolivian miners (1984–2001).

== Biography ==
Wicky was born in 1946 in Moutier, Switzerland. His photos have been exhibited at the Swiss Foundation for Photography, the Musée de l'Élysée in Lausanne, and the Minneapolis Institute of Arts, as well as in magazines including GEO and Smithsonian Magazine.

He died 31 July 2016, in Biel, Switzerland, at age 70.

== Works ==
- Mineros, 2002, ISBN 2-7427-4062-7 (French), ISBN 84-7782-826-1 (Spanish), ISBN 3-926318-53-8 (German).

== Films ==
- Every Day is Night, 2010,
