= Force démocratique =

Pro-Bernese organization in the Jura question

- Predecessor: Union des patriotes jurassiens
- Formation: March 1974
- Type: Political organization
- Region served: Bernese Jura

Force démocratique (FD), formerly known as the Union des patriotes jurassiens (UPJ), was a pro-Bernese organization active in the context of the Jura question in the Bernese Jura.

== History ==
=== Origins and the Union des patriotes jurassiens ===
The organization's origin dates back to the "Manifesto of the 360", written by Roland Stähli and published in November 1952. This text rallied thousands of citizens opposed to the separatism of the Rassemblement jurassien within a few weeks. This led to the founding of the Union des patriotes jurassiens (UPJ), whose first congress, chaired by Marc Houmard, was held in Saint-Imier in April 1953. The UPJ's primary objective was the defense of the interests of the Jura and the French language within the Canton of Bern.

=== Formation of Force démocratique ===
In March 1974, facing the upcoming plebiscite, the UPJ took the name Force démocratique (FD), an umbrella organization bringing together the Sanglier group (youth), founded in 1973, and the Groupement féminin de Force démocratique, founded by Geneviève Aubry in 1974. Following the plebiscite of 23 June 1974, FD called for the continuation of the plebiscitary procedure.

=== Post-1975 activities ===
Since the vote of 16 March 1975, which kept the districts of Moutier, Courtelary and La Neuveville in the Canton of Bern, FD, chaired by Marc-André Houmard since 1977, has actively participated in the reorganization of the Bernese Jura. FD accepted the establishment of the Assemblée interjurassienne in 1994 and approved the draft law on the special status of the Bernese Jura in 2003.

== Publications ==
Le Jurassien was the press organ of the anti-separatists from 1953 to 1979, replaced since then by Le Quinquet.
