= Moeckli Affair =

1947 political crisis in Bern

- Date: September 9, 1947
- Location: Bern, Switzerland
- Also known as: Affaire Moeckli
- Type: Political crisis
- Cause: Refusal to appoint Georges Moeckli to head of Public Works
- Participants: Grand Council of Bern, Georges Moeckli, Samuel Brawand
- Outcome: Creation of the Moutier Committee and the Mouvement séparatiste jurassien

The Moeckli Affair refers to the refusal of the Grand Council of Bern to appoint Jura councillor of state Georges Moeckli to head the Direction of Public Works and Railways in September 1947. By reviving the Jura Question, this affair is considered a distant origin of the creation of the canton of Jura.

== Background ==
Following the death of councillor of state Ernst Reinhard, the socialist Moeckli, who had headed the Social Works and Assistance department since 1938, sought to take over Public Works, which was also claimed by Reinhard's successor, the Oberland socialist Samuel Brawand.

== Events ==
On 9 September 1947, the Grand Council preferred the agrarians' proposal (Brawand) to that of the Executive Council (Moeckli), by ninety-two votes to sixty-two. This decision was confirmed narrowly on 17 September, affirming the council's determination to keep the definition of priorities in regional economic policy and transport policy in Alemannic hands.

On 20 September, a protest demonstration bringing together 2,000 people in Delémont called for the creation of a "committee for the defence of the rights and interests of the Jura, which will establish a programme of demands and action." On 2 October, the Moutier Committee was formed. Its greatest success was the formal recognition of the "Jura people" by the Bernese Constitution in 1950.

== Consequences ==
The day of protest triggered a second dynamic: one of the speakers, industrialist Daniel Charpilloz, called for the creation of a canton of Jura. This demand was soon taken up by the Mouvement séparatiste jurassien (Jura Separatist Movement), created on 30 November 1947.

The Moeckli Affair occurred in a context of unease between the Jura minority and the old canton of Bern, including attempted Germanisation, longstanding grievances over transport and culture, and other issues. While the affair did not create the Jura question, it played a decisive role as a catalyst.
