= Xavier Stockmar =

Swiss politician (1797–1864)

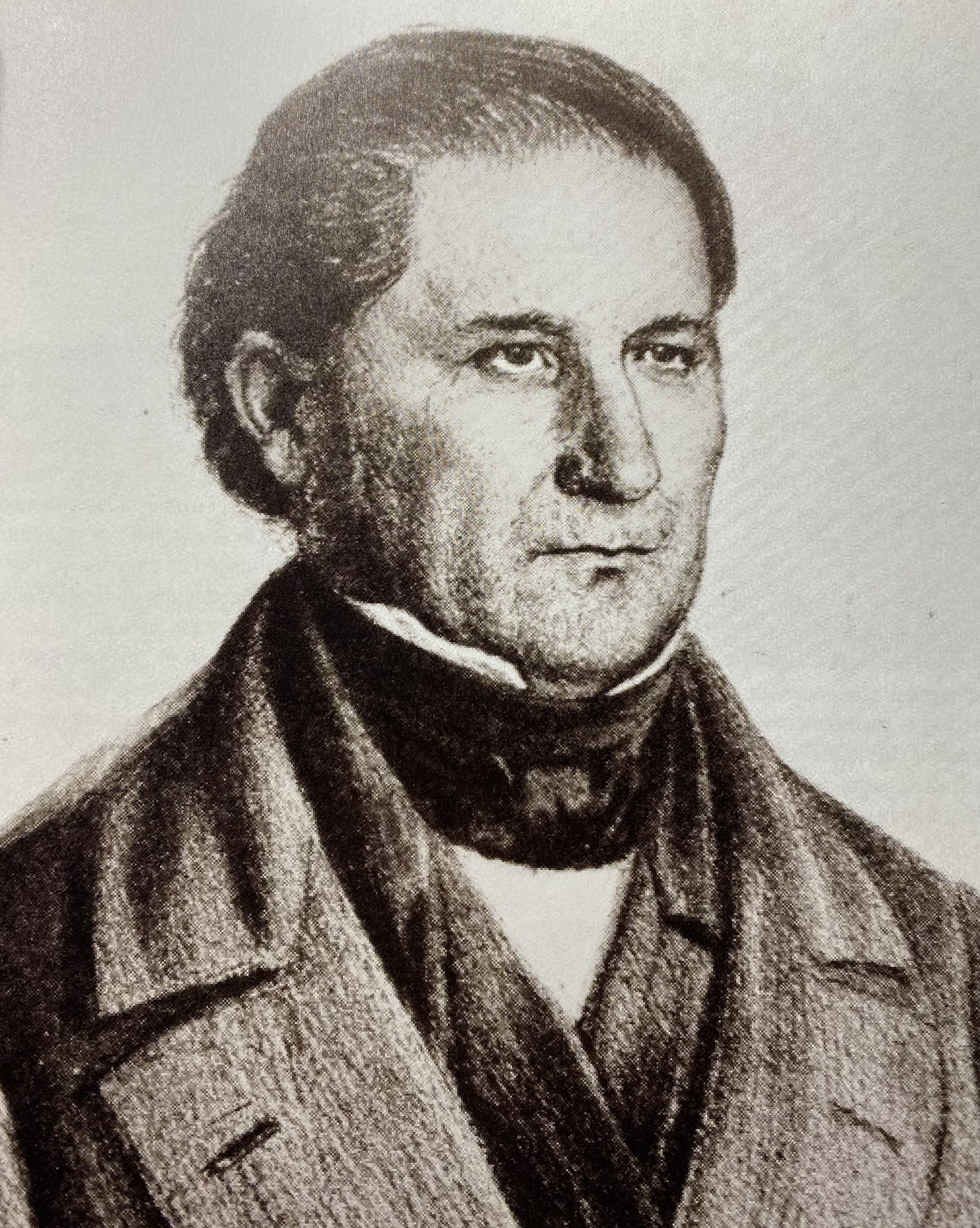

Personal details
- Born: 25 December 1797 Porrentruy, Switzerland
- Died: 21 June 1864 (aged 66) Bern, Switzerland
- Party: Liberal
- Spouse: Rosalie Marquis (m. 1820)
- Occupation: Politician, businessman

Xavier Stockmar (25 December 1797 – 21 June 1864) was a Swiss politician and businessman who played a leading role in the liberal movement in the Canton of Bern and the Jura region. He served as a member of the Bern Cantonal Executive Council, the Grand Council of Bern, and the Swiss National Council.

== Early life and business career ==
Stockmar was born on 25 December 1797 in Porrentruy to François Joseph Wenceslas Stockmar, who served as chief forester and hunting supervisor for the Prince-Bishopric of Basel and later as general forest inspector under the French regime, and Marguerite Brieffer. He was originally from Rastatt in Baden, and acquired citizenship in Montmelon (1817) and Porrentruy (1846). After attending the Collège de Porrentruy, he completed a commercial apprenticeship in Porrentruy and Seloncourt in the Doubs. In 1820, he married Rosalie Marquis, daughter of Jean-Pierre Marquis, a wigmaker.

Stockmar worked as an employee at the arms manufactory of Pont-d'Able in Porrentruy, then served as assistant director of the Lucelle forges from 1822 to 1829. He returned to Porrentruy to establish a wine trade and, with a partner, created a haulage company in Basel. He accumulated wealth through land speculation in Alsace and wine trading in Franche-Comté.

== Political career ==
=== Rise to prominence ===
Attracted to politics from an early age, Stockmar became the Jurassian leader of the liberal movement that overthrew the Bernese patriciate and was one of the influential members of the 1831 Constitutional Assembly. He served as prefect of Porrentruy from 1831 to 1835 and was a deputy in the Bernese Grand Council (1831–1835, 1839, 1846, 1850–1854, 1858–1862). In 1832, he founded the liberal newspaper L'Helvétie.

In 1835, Stockmar was appointed to the Council of State. However, in 1839 he was dismissed by the Grand Council on charges of treason. He was suspected of leading the separatist movement, which had been provoked notably by Bern's intention to abolish French legislation in the Jura. Facing the threat of arrest in 1840, he went into exile in France.

=== Exile and return ===
While in exile, Stockmar conceived a project for a Swiss colony in Algeria, which was rejected by the French government in 1841. After living in Paris from 1841 to 1842, he managed the steel factory in Valentigney, Doubs, from 1843 to 1845, then retired to his property in Rosières, near Blamont in the Doubs.

His return to Switzerland in 1846 occurred in the context of the radical revolution. Stockmar was elected to the Bernese Constitutional Assembly and once again to the government (1846–1850). After the victory of the conservatives in 1850, he resumed management of the Bellefontaine forges in 1852, before returning to the Council of State (1862–1864), where he headed the Department of Public Works.

=== Federal roles ===
During the Sonderbund War, Stockmar served as federal commissioner in Fribourg. He was a member of the Swiss National Council from 1848 to 1851 and again from 1854 to 1864. He was a co-founder of the Société jurassienne d'émulation in 1847 and one of the principal promoters of railway development in the Jura.
