= Tornos AG =

Swiss machine-tool manufacturer

- Formerly: Tornos Holding AG
- Type: Aktiengesellschaft
- Traded as: SIX: TOHN
- ISIN: CH0011607683
- Industry: Machine industry
- Founded: 1880
- Headquarters: Moutier, Switzerland
- Key people: Michael Hauser
- Revenue: CHF 181.44M (2023)
- Number of employees: 681 (2022)
- Parent: Starrag Tornos Group AG
- Website: www.tornos.com

Tornos AG (formerly known as Tornos-Bechler SA), based in Moutier, is a Swiss machine tool manufacturer listed on the SIX Swiss Exchange.

== History ==
=== Prehistory ===
The history of Tornos goes back to 1880, when the first machines for the production of small parts for the watchmaking industry were manufactured in Moutier.

One of the entrepreneurs at the time was Nicolas Junker, a mechanic from Thurgau born in 1851. In 1883, Junker and his business partner Anselme Marchal founded the company Junker et Cie. In the same year, Junker began producing automatic machines and was the first entrepreneur to bring mass-produced lathes onto the market. The lathes were mainly used to produce screws, due to the increasing demand from the watchmaking industry. Junker also further developed the so-called Schweizer Drehbank (Swiss lathe), an invention of Jakob Schweizer from 1880. Following Anselme Marchal's departure, the company was entered in the commercial register in 1886 under the name N. Junker. In 1891, Junker bought the company building from Basel industrialist Emile Abt, whose possession it had been in since 1886.

1895 Junker built the Villa Junker, which has since become a museum for automatic lathes, where visitors can learn about the history of the municipality of Moutier. The company was realigned under Junker's direction in 1896. From this point onwards, the company manufactured clocks and watches as well as their components.

In his watch factory, Junker built a production facility employing a water wheel that he personally designed and constructed. In 1904, Junker sold the business, which had run into financial difficulties, to his son Emile. A year later, the company launched the Mettetal/Junker Fils automatic sliding headstock lathe, equipped with three tools. In the same year, Emile Junker had to file for bankruptcy. As Junker was unable to cope with the company's demise, he committed suicide in 1907.

=== Foundation and beginnings ===
In 1914, from the bankruptcy of Junker et Cie. emerged the new company called Tornos, which manufactured automatic lathes in competition with Joseph Pétermann and André Bechler's company, the latter a former apprentice of Junker. In the same year, Bechler founded his own company, which also produced automatic lathes from 1924.

In the following years, Tornos developed the Lambert (1925) and Walker (1930) automatic sliding head lathes equipped with three tools and a counter drill, as well as the Tornos B1 (1930) automatic lathe, which had five tools and a movable headstock. With the Pétermann n°0 (1935), Tornos launched a pedestal-mounted automatic lathe with three tools and a threading device; the Tornos R7 automatic lathe (1959) with six sliding toolholders was sold by Tornos as a limited product series.

In 1971, Tornos took over Pétermann's factory. The company's first numerically controlled automatic lathe with sliding headstock, the Elector 16, was presented in 1978. The three companies Tornos, Pétermann and Bechler became Tornos-Bechler SA in 1981.

=== Acquisitions and reorganisation ===
In 1989, Tornos-Bechler SA acquired a majority shareholding in the French company Wirth & Gruffat in Annecy. In addition to its own production programme, Wirth & Gruffat also took over part of Tornos-Bechler's production. In 1996, Tornos-Bechler launched the Deco turning machine line on the market. When Tornos-Bechler SA was renamed to Tornos SA in 2001, the three former competitors Tornos, Pétermann and Bechler were united under a single company name. In the same year, the company was listed on the stock exchange. In 2008, Tornos took over the machine manufacturer Almac in La Chaux-de-Fonds, Switzerland. Tornos launched the Multiswiss multispindle machine in 2012.

In 2014, Tornos focussed its product strategy on a more affordable price segment, moving away from its previous focus on selling high-priced machines. As a result, the company opened production facilities in Xi'an, China, and Taichung, Taiwan.

=== Recent developments ===
In 2016, Tornos added three new models to its Multiswiss multispindle turning machine programme. In 2021, the production site in La Chaux-de-Fonds closed, while the following year saw the opening of s production facility in Poland.

On 7 December 2023, Tornos Holding AG merged with Starrag Group Holding AG to form Starrag Tornos Group AG. Tornos Holding AG, a subsidiary of Starrag Tornos Group AG, was renamed Tornos AG.

In March 2024, Tornos opened a further production facility in Taiwan.

In 2024, Tornos collaborated with Paul Horn GmbH of Tübingen to develop a manufacturing process for machining components made of lead-free brass on MultiSwiss multi-spindle lathes. This involved transferring production from single-spindle to multi-spindle machines, thereby reducing the machining time per workpiece.

== Company structure ==
Michael Hauser is the director of Tornos AG. In the 2022 financial year, the company employed 681 people and generated consolidated sales of CHF 181.44 million.

The Group has four production sites: Moutier in Switzerland, Xi'an in China and two in Taichung in Taiwan. Tornos is represented by subsidiaries in Europe, the US, Asia and Australia.

== Products ==
The company manufactures automatic single-spindle lathes, multispindle lathes, peripheral systems, bar mills for microtechnology applications and bar feeders. The machines are controlled by the company's communication and programming software Tisis and are used in the automotive, medical, electronics, watchmaking and subcontracting industries.

The production facilities in Taiwan and China manufacture machines in the entry-level and mid-price segments, while single-spindle sliding headstock automatic lathes and multispindle lathes such as the Multiswiss, Evodeco and Swissnano are produced in Moutier, Switzerland.
