= Burrus family =

Swiss industrial family

Burrus
- Country: Switzerland
- Current region: Boncourt, Jura
- Origin: Dambach-la-Ville, Alsace
- Founded: 1814 (tobacco business)
- Founder: Martin Burrus
- Members: Martin Burrus; François-Joseph Burrus; Joseph Burrus; François Burrus; Henry Burrus; Léon Burrus

Burrus is a Swiss industrial family originally from Dambach-la-Ville in Alsace, naturalized Swiss, of Seleute (1871) and Boncourt (1887). The family established and operated one of Switzerland's major tobacco manufacturing enterprises for six generations from 1814 to 1996.

== History ==
In 1814, Martin Burrus (1775–1830), a winegrower who came from Alsace, established a small tobacco roll factory in Boncourt. Two sons of François-Joseph Burrus, Joseph (1838–1921) and François (1844–1915), succeeded their father in Boncourt, while three others established a second factory in 1872 in Sainte-Croix-aux-Mines, which became the most important tobacco factory in Alsace before 1914 and was nationalized after 1918.

Six generations directed the enterprise, expanding and modernizing the Boncourt factory and holding all the capital. The company became a joint-stock company (SA) in 1979 and was restructured as a holding company in 1984. The family sold the enterprise to the Dutch group Rothmans International in 1996.

The Boncourt factory employed approximately one hundred workers at the end of the 19th century, 350 in 1950, 600 in 1974, and 400 in 1991.

== Paternalism and civic engagement ==
The family distinguished itself through its paternalism toward both personnel and the village of Boncourt. Employee benefits included family allowances (1916), health and accident insurance (1919), pension fund, and real estate loans. Community contributions included support for local associations, a parish house, football stadium, and a home for the elderly. François, Henry, and Léon Burrus (1904–1990) served as mayors of the village.

As patrons, the Burrus family supported the Catholic Church, maintaining privileged relations with the Vatican—Gérard Burrus (1910–1997) was appointed secret chamberlain of cape and sword—as well as various scientific and cultural foundations.
