= Ernest Daucourt =

Swiss journalist and politician

Personal details
- Born: 20 October 1848 Porrentruy, Bern, Switzerland
- Died: 3 January 1941 (aged 92) Porrentruy, Bern, Switzerland
- Party: Conservative Catholic Party
- Relations: Paul Migy (uncle)
- Parent(s): Marie-Ernest Daucourt (father); Amélie Migy (mother)
- Occupation: Lawyer, journalist, politician

Ernest Daucourt (20 October 1848 – 3 January 1941) was a Swiss lawyer, journalist, and politician from Porrentruy in the Canton of Bern. He was a prominent figure in the Catholic conservative movement in the Bernese Jura during the Kulturkampf and served as a member of the National Council from 1902 to 1919.

== Early life and education ==
Ernest Daucourt was born on 20 October 1848 in Porrentruy to Marie-Ernest Daucourt, a physician, and Amélie Migy. He was the nephew of Paul Migy and remained unmarried throughout his life. After attending primary school in Porrentruy, he pursued his studies in Colmar and with the Jesuits in Dole. He obtained his baccalauréat in Dijon in 1868 and studied philosophy and law in Paris and Bern. He was admitted to the bar in 1873.

== Journalism and political career ==
Daucourt worked as a contributor to the Gazette Jurassienne before founding Le Pays in 1873, a new Catholic conservative newspaper. He served as owner and editor-in-chief from 1873 to 1894 and again from 1917 to 1923.

He was elected to the Grand Council of Bern in 1882, serving until 1894. In 1894, he became prefect of Porrentruy, the first to be elected by popular vote, a position he held until 1913. From 1902 to 1919, he served as a member of the National Council. In 1879, he founded the Union des campagnes, a new organization of the Catholic conservative party in the Jura. In 1912, he co-founded the Swiss Conservative People's Party and served on its executive committee. He also served as president of the Catholic commission of the Canton of Bern.

Daucourt was a member of the Bernese section of the Industrial and Commercial Society and the student society Jurassia. He maintained a friendship with National Councillor Xavier Jobin.

== Role in the Kulturkampf ==
During the Kulturkampf, Daucourt, along with Casimir Folletête, embodied the resistance of Catholic Jura against the Bernese government. In Le Pays, he fought for the rights of the Catholic Church in the Jura, basing his arguments on the Act of Reunion of 1815. The French publicist Louis Veuillot, a defender of the dogma of papal infallibility, served as his model.

== Later years ==
After renouncing his political mandates, Daucourt wrote historical pamphlets. His reputation also rests on the various social institutions he created in the Jura region.

Daucourt died on 3 January 1941 in Porrentruy at the age of 92.
