= Georges Moeckli =

Swiss politician (1889–1974)

Member of the Swiss Council of States
- In office 1948–1959

Member of the Executive Council of Bern
- In office 1938–1954

Member of the National Council
- In office 1935–1938

Member of the Grand Council of Bern
- In office 1932–1935

Personal details
- Born: 14 February 1889 La Neuveville, Switzerland
- Died: 9 June 1974 (aged 85) Delémont, Switzerland
- Party: Social Democratic Party
- Spouse: Dina Hortense Joray (m. 1918)
- Occupation: Teacher, politician

Georges Moeckli (14 February 1889 – 9 June 1974) was a Swiss politician and teacher from the Jura region. He was the son of Théodore Moeckli. In 1918, he married Dina Hortense Joray, daughter of Victor-Adolphe, a farmer.

== Education and early career ==
Moeckli attended school in La Neuveville and completed his teacher training at the normal school in Porrentruy. He worked as a primary school teacher from 1907 to 1911. He then studied at the universities of Neuchâtel and Bern, obtaining a secondary teaching certificate. From 1915 to 1938, he taught German at the progymnasium in Delémont.

== Political career ==
Moeckli served as a municipal councillor in Delémont from 1921 to 1936. He was a member of the Grand Council of Bern from 1932 to 1935, and served in the National Council from 1935 to 1938. In 1938, he was elected to the Executive Council of Bern, where he served until 1954, responsible for social welfare and assistance. During his tenure on the Executive Council, he also served as president of the delegation for Jura affairs. From 1948 to 1959, he was a member of the Swiss Council of States.

Influenced by the social misery he witnessed during and after World War I, during which he served as an officer, Moeckli joined the ranks of moderate socialists. He became a member of the Social Democratic Party section in Delémont in 1919 and served as its president from 1926 to 1937. He was president and vice-president of the Jura Socialist Party from 1940 to 1959. In 1925, he participated in the founding of the Association for the Defense of the Interests of the Jura, serving as its secretary until 1935.

As the first socialist elected to the Executive Council alongside Robert Grimm, Moeckli focused primarily on assistance during the war and the introduction of old-age and survivors' insurance. After his government mandate, he worked to improve transportation in the Jura.

== The Moeckli affair ==
In September 1947, a majority of the Grand Council of Bern refused to appoint Moeckli to the Directorate of Public Works and Railways. This decision provoked a wave of protest in the Jura that led to the creation of the Jurassic Separatist Movement (Mouvement séparatiste jurassien). Although Moeckli had always adopted a reserved attitude toward the Jura question, he unwittingly became the catalyst for the crisis.
