= Société jurassienne d'émulation =

Cultural society of the Jura region

- Abbreviation: SJE
- Formation: 1847
- Founder: Xavier Stockmar
- Type: Cultural society
- Purpose: Cultural promotion of the Jura region
- Members: 2,000+ (2010)
- Official language: French

The Société jurassienne d'émulation (SJE) is a cultural society founded in 1847 in Porrentruy, Switzerland, dedicated to the cultural promotion of the Jura region in literary, historical, scientific, and artistic fields. The society publishes annual proceedings (Actes) and operates through seventeen sections across the Canton of Jura and Bernese Jura, as well as in cities of French-speaking Switzerland and German-speaking Switzerland.

== History ==
The Société jurassienne d'émulation was founded in 1847 in Porrentruy on the initiative of Xavier Stockmar. From its inception, the society committed to working toward the cultural influence of the Jura in literary, historical, scientific, and artistic domains, notably through the annual publication of its proceedings (Actes). While prohibiting partisan and religious spirit, the society participated in the 19th century in various debates of general interest, including matters of assistance, reorganization of bourgeoisies, education, and industries.

In 1943, the Société jurassienne d'émulation, together with other Jurassian associations, presented cultural demands to the Bernese authorities. Following the Moeckli Affair in 1947, the society participated in the creation of the Comité de Moutier. After the self-determination plebiscites of 1974-1975, the society redefined its role to maintain the moral, cultural, and identity unity of the historic Jura.

== Organization ==
As of 2010, the Société jurassienne d'émulation had more than 2,000 members and was organized into seventeen sections in the Jura (Canton of Jura and Bernese Jura) and in cities of French-speaking and German-speaking Switzerland. The society has created six specialized circles:

- Circle of Historical Studies (1970)
- Circle of Scientific Studies (1971)
- Circle of Archaeology (1990)
- Circle of Mathematics and Physics (1997)
- Circle of Patois (2000)
- Literary Circle (2005)

== Activities ==
The society organizes colloques and exhibitions, awards prizes, and carries out extensive publishing activities. Notable publications include the Anthologie jurassienne (1964-1965) and the Nouvelle histoire du Jura (1984).
