= Moutier =

- Municipality
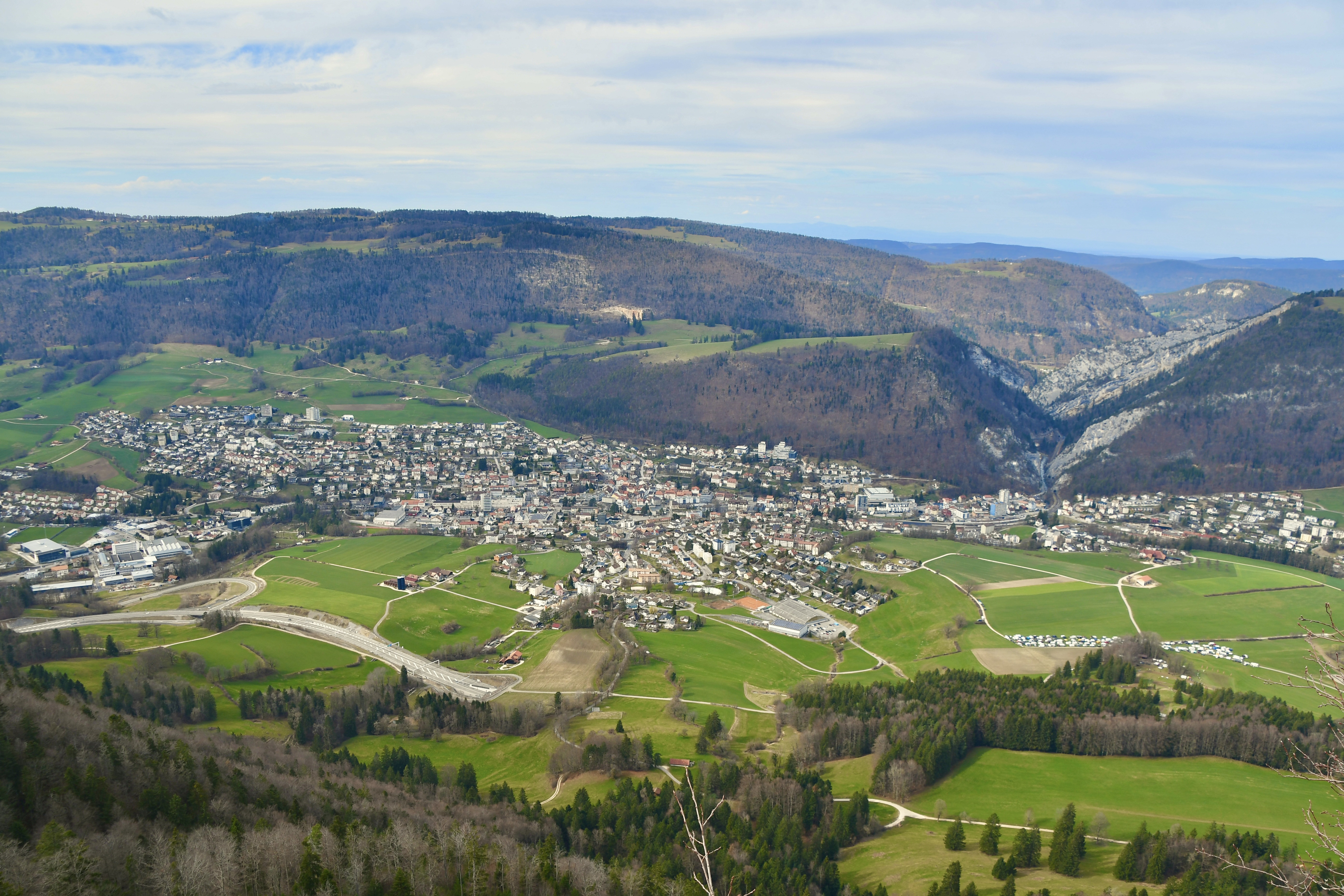

- Flag Coat of arms
- Location of Moutier
- Location within Switzerland Location within Canton of Jura
- Coordinates: 47°16′43″N 07°22′14″E
- Country: Switzerland
- Canton: Jura
- District: Moutier District

Government
  - Executive: Conseil municipal with 9 members
  - Mayor: Maire; Marcel Winistoerfer Centre (as of March 2021)
  - Parliament: Conseil de Ville with 41 members

Area
  - Total: 19.53 km^{2} (7.54 sq mi)
- Elevation: 535 m (1,755 ft)

Population (2020)
  - Total: 7,348
  - Density: 376.2/km^{2} (974.5/sq mi)
- Time zone: UTC+01:00 (CET)
  - Summer (DST): UTC+02:00 (CEST)
- Postal code: 2740
- SFOS number: 6831
- ISO 3166 code: CH-JU
- Surrounded by: Perrefitte, Champoz, Court, Eschert, Belprahon, Roches, Châtillon, Soulce
- Website: moutier.ch

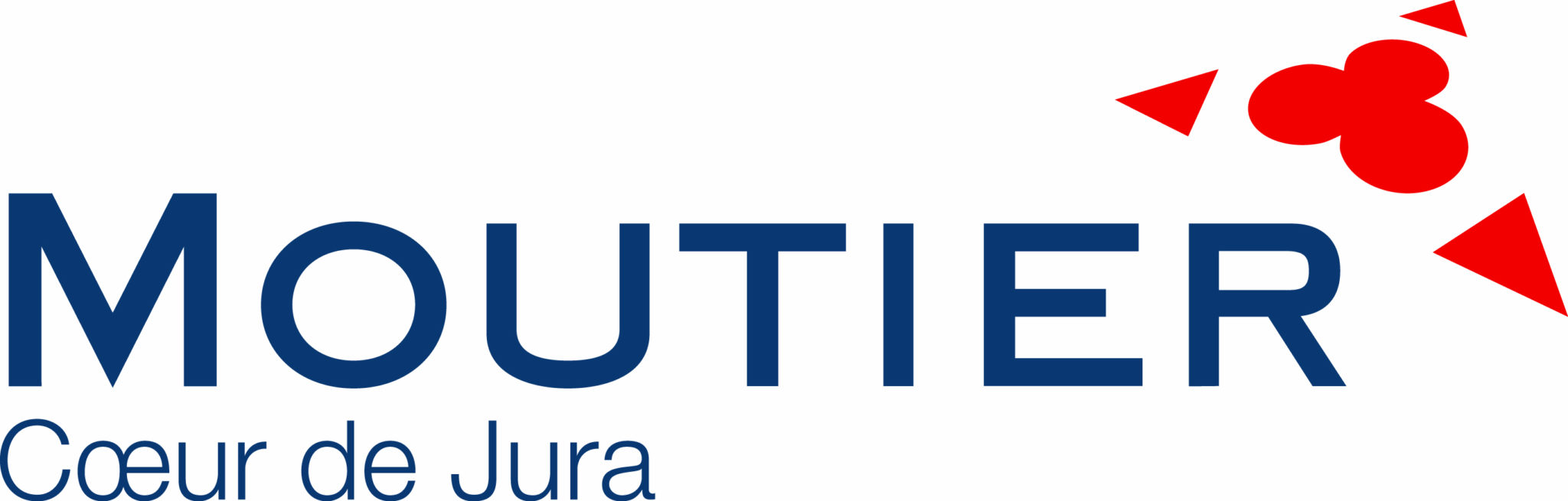
Logo of the municipality of Moutier

Moutier (French pronunciation: [mutje]; Arpitan: Motiér) is a municipality in Switzerland. Until 31 December 2025, the town belonged to the Jura bernois administrative district of the canton of Bern. On 28 March 2021, the population voted to secede and join the Canton of Jura. The decision entailed a lengthy process of transfer of competences between cantonal authorities.

The change to the canton of Jura took effect on 1 January 2026.

Until then, Moutier was the largest town in Bernese Jura.

== History ==
Moutier is first mentioned in 1154 in the phrase datum Monasterii. In 1181, it was mentioned as apud Monasterium ('at the Abbey'). The German name for the town is Münster (BE), but it is not frequently used.

The area was lightly settled even before the founding of Moutier-Grandval Abbey around 640. Much of the early history of the village is closely connected with the Abbey. Between 1049 and 1150, the Abbey was granted a stift or land donation to support the college of canons. The stift allowed the Abbey to grow into a major landholder and a regional power. The village church of Saint-Pierre, which eventually became a parish church, was probably built during the Early Middle Ages. In the 12th century, another monastery was founded in Moutier, but it was destroyed in a fire in 1269. In addition to the Church of Saint-Pierre, the collegiate church of Saint-Germain and Saint-Randoald was built in Moutier during the 12th century. Everything changed in Moutier after the Protestant Reformation was accepted by Bern in 1531. The Abbey closed and the college of canons relocated to Delémont. The church of Saint-Germain and Saint-Randoald was closed while the church of Saint-Pierre converted to the new faith and was expanded. A fire destroyed the church of Saint-Germain and Saint-Randoald in 1571 though in 1860–63 a Reformed church was built on the site. The church of Saint-Pierre was demolished in 1873. Today Moutier has both German and French speaking churches.

After the college of canons of the Abbey moved to Delémont, the Abbey's properties in and around Moutier fell under the Prince-Bishop of Basel. The Bishop appointed a provost to manage the Abbey's estates and around the end of the 16th century, built the Provost's Castle. The provost remained in Moutier until 1797. After the 1797 French victory and the Treaty of Campo Formio, Moutier became part of the French Département of Mont-Terrible. In 1800, it became part of the Département of Haut-Rhin. After Napoleon's defeat and the Congress of Vienna, Moutier was assigned to the Canton of Bern in 1815. In 1817, the Canton of Bern acquired the castle and used it as the seat of the district governor.

During the 19th century and early 20th century, Moutier developed into a transportation hub (→ History of rail transport in Switzerland). In 1876, a railway opened between Basel and Moutier. This first railroad was followed by a route to Biel through the Tavannes valley in 1877 and then to Solothurn in 1908. In 1915, the 8.6 kilometers (5.3 mi) long Grenchenberg tunnel connected Moutier and Grenchen. The extensive road and railroad network encouraged Moutier to industrialize, with three industries, glass-making, watchmaking, and automatic lathes, gaining international recognition for Moutier.

In 1842, Célestin Châtelain founded the Verrerie de Moutier glass factory. They became the most important window glass manufacturer in Switzerland and by the 1970s produced 250 tons of glass per month to meet Swiss domestic demand. The conversion from glass rolling to float glass spelled the end of the old Moutier glass factory, it closed in 1978. However, a subsidiary, Verres Industriels SA, had been created in 1955 and they began producing glass with the new process. Today, Verres Industriels employs about 200 people.

Watchmaking first spread throughout the Jura region as a cottage industry during the 19th century. In the late 19th century, the Grande Fabrique was built in Moutier and by 1880 employed about 500 workers. A number of watchmakers opened factories in the town, of which Léon Lévy & Frères and Louis Schwab were some of the largest. However, many of Moutier's independent watchmakers went bankrupt and were forced to close during the Great Depression. Those that survived this period were generally absorbed by ETA SA in the 1950s.

In 1883, Nicolas Junker founded the Junker & Cie company to manufacture automatic lathes with a moveable headstock. After a bankruptcy and several name changes the company became Usines Tornos, Fabrique de machines Moutier SA in 1918. In 1968, Tornos bought the Pétermann SA company to become Tornos Pétermann. They then merged in 1974 with Bechler SA to become Moutier Machines Holding, which became Tornos-Bechler SA in 1981. It was renamed to Tornos SA in 2001. Over its nearly a century in operation, Usines Tornos built workers' housing, provided jobs and vocational training and helped drive Moutier's growth. At its peak in 1974, the company employed about 3,000 people. Between 1980 and 2000, the company acquired and sold off several companies and reduced its headcount to about 1300 in 2001. In 2010, the company employed 855 people, including 655 in Moutier.

In 1950, Moutier became a city and a number of construction projects followed. A swimming pool opened in that same year. In 1955 a second primary school opened along with a new building for the secondary school. A new train station opened in 1961. In 1962 the old secondary school was converted into a town hall. A primary school in Chantemerle opened in 1973 and a new district hospital was built in 1976. There are two museums in town, the villa Bechler with the Jurassic Museum of Arts and the villa Junker with the Museum of Automatic Lathes.

Politically, the issue of Jura separatism is a major issue in Moutier. In 1974, a plebiscite voted to remain part of Bern by a margin of only 70 votes. This led to acts of vandalism on 16 March 1974 and on 7 September 1975 an armed standoff at the Hôtel de la Gare which was broken up by an elite team of Bernese police on the following day. Two other plebiscites also came down on the side of remaining in the Canton of Bern, including one in 1998 which passed with a thin majority of 41 votes. In 2013, a third plebiscite ended with the majority of residents choosing to remain in Bern, though a majority of residents of Moutier wanted to join Jura. On 18 June 2017, the municipality held a referendum, asking citizens 'Do you want the city of Moutier to belong to the Republic and Canton of Jura?' The result of the referendum was 51.7% of the citizenry voting in favour of Moutier joining the Canton of Jura. The vote has since been declared invalid.

On 28 March 2021, a repeated referendum saw 54.9% of Moutier voters once again vote in favour of seceding from Bern to join Jura. The process was declared valid, and as such, the transfer process began and is expected to take around 5 years. A fourth district for Moutier will be created in the Canton of Jura once the transfer is complete.

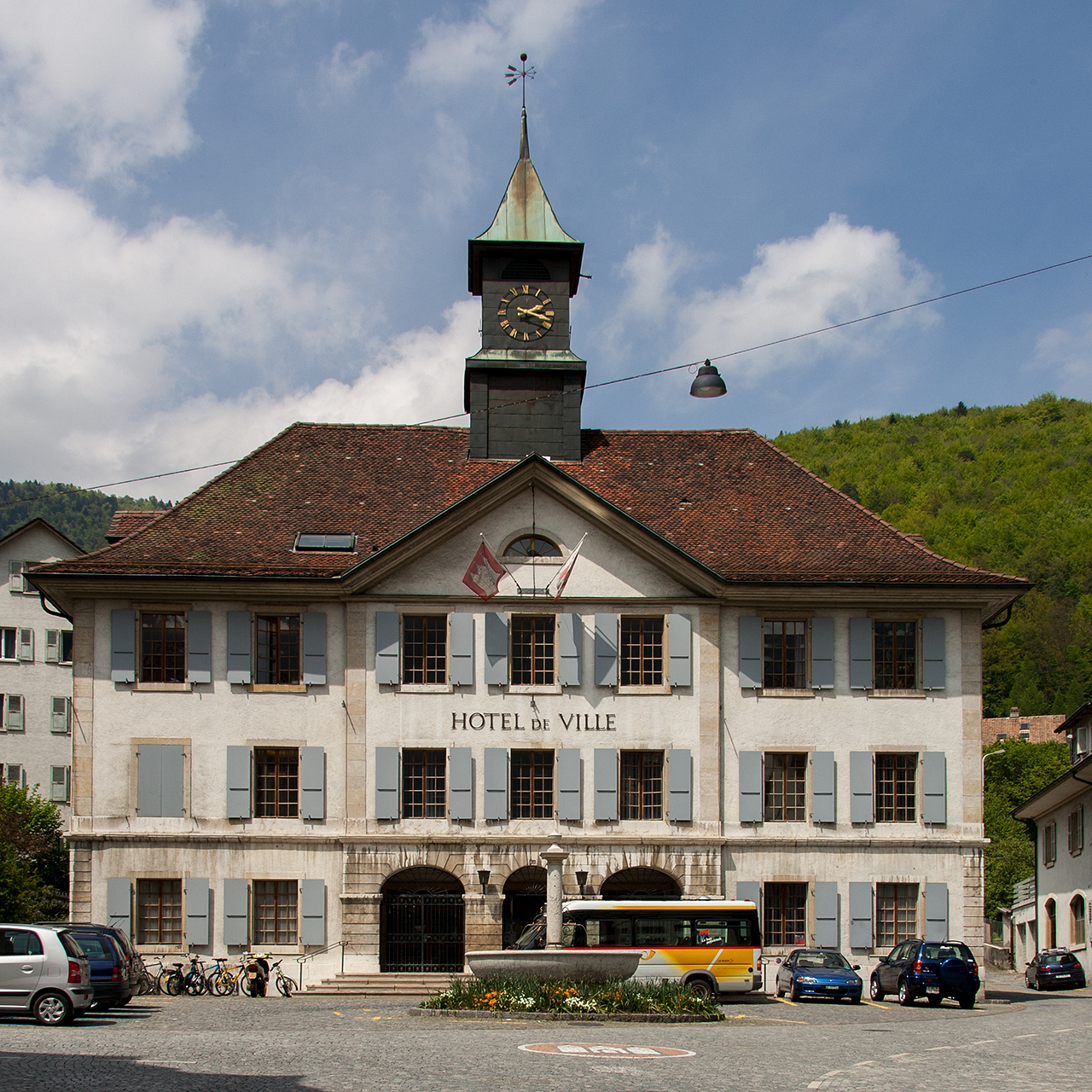
The Hôtel de ville (town hall) of Moutier

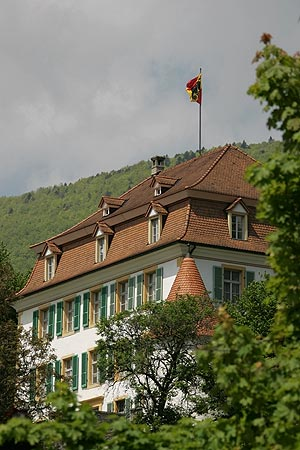
Moutier Provost's Castle

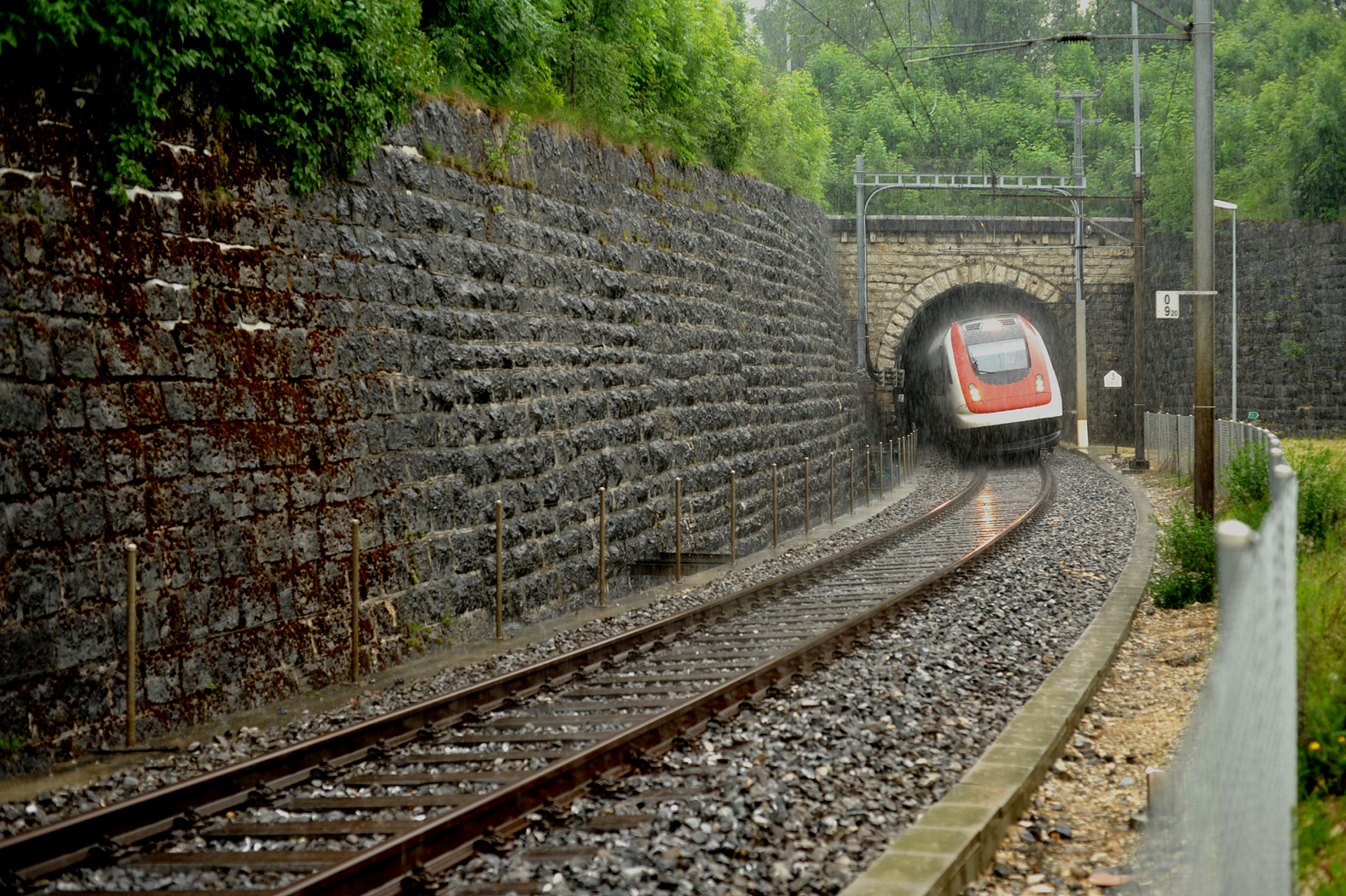
Grenchenberg tunnel

Aerial view from 400 m by Walter Mittelholzer (1931)

== Geography ==
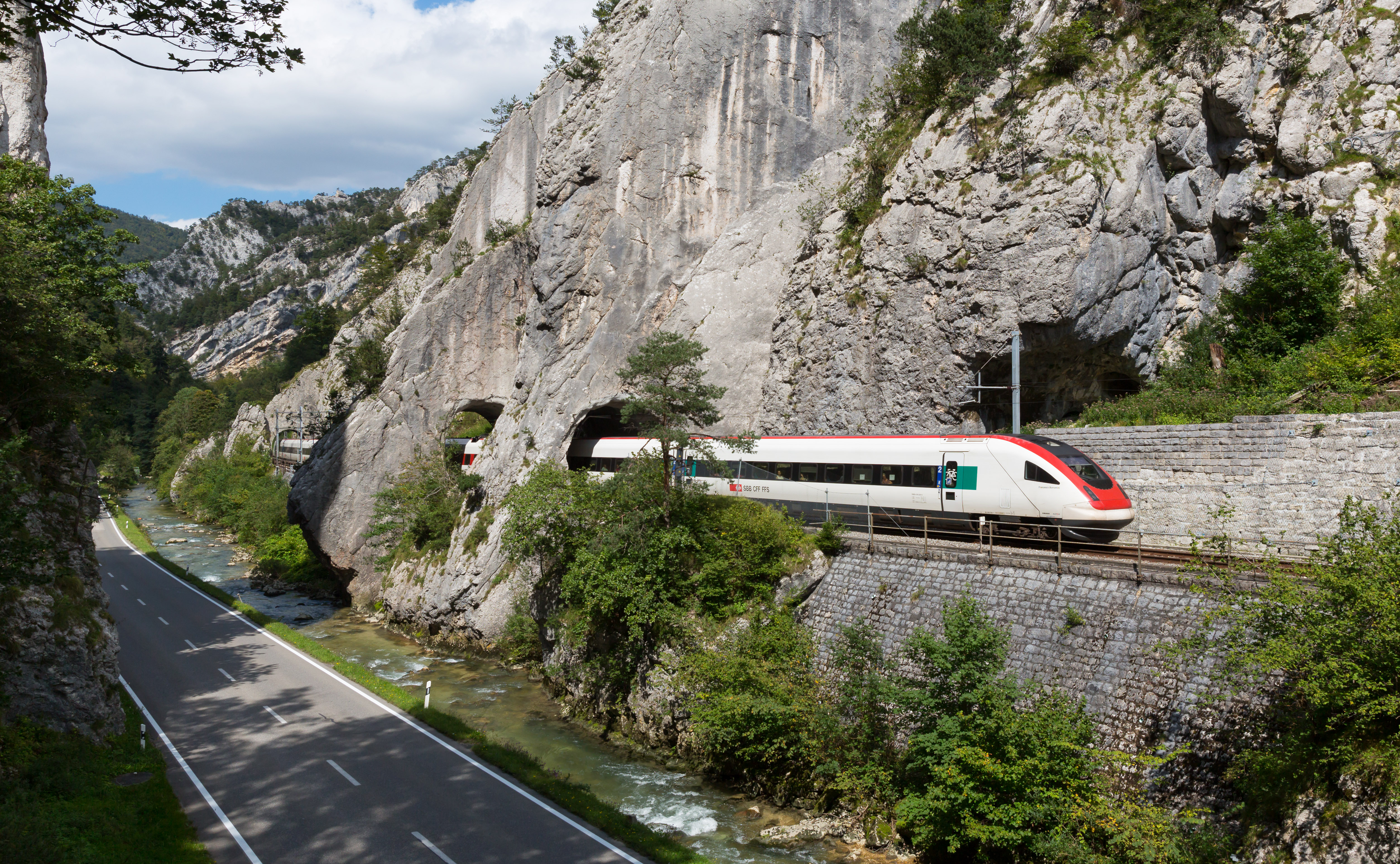
Road, Birs river and railway line in the Moutier Gorge

Moutier has an area of 19.61 km^{2} (7.57 sq mi). As of 2012, a total of 5.84 km^{2} (2.25 mi^{2}) or 29.8% is used for agricultural purposes, while 10.76 km^{2} (4.15 mi^{2}) or 55.0% is forested. Of the rest of the land, 2.73 km^{2} (1.05 mi^{2}) or 13.9% is settled (buildings or roads), 0.18 km^{2} (0.069 mi^{2}) or 0.9% is either rivers or lakes, and 0.11 km^{2} (27 acres) or 0.6% is unproductive land.

During the same year, industrial buildings made up 1.3% of the total area while housing and buildings made up 6.9% and transportation infrastructure made up 3.5%. Power and water infrastructure as well as other special developed areas made up 1.5% of the area. Out of the forested land, 52.4% of the total land area is heavily forested and 2.6% is covered with orchards or small clusters of trees. Of the agricultural land, 3.7% is used for growing crops, 14.1% is used as pastures, and 11.6% is used for alpine pastures. All the water in the municipality is flowing water.

The area around Moutier is called the Prévôté. It is a valley crossed by a river called the Birs. It covers the area from Court Gorge to Moutier Gorge and includes some scattered farm houses on the Montagne de Moutier (Moutier Mountain).

On 31 December 2009, the District de Moutier, of which it was the capital, was dissolved. On the following day, 1 January 2010, it joined the newly created Arrondissement administratif Jura bernois.

== Coat of arms ==
The blazon of the municipal coat of arms is Gules a Monastery Argent.

== Demographics ==
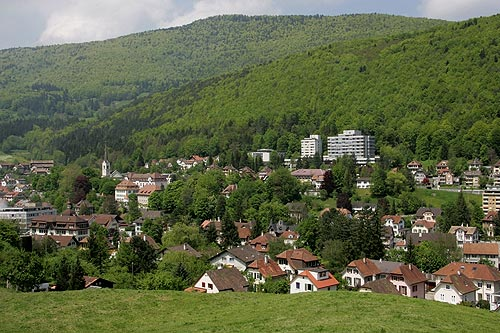
Moutier

Moutier has a population (as of December 2020) of 7,348. As of 2010, 23.4% of the population are resident foreign nationals. Over the last 10 years (2001–2011) the population has changed at a rate of 0.2%. Migration accounted for 0%, while births and deaths accounted for −0.2%.

Most of the population (as of 2000) speaks French (6,658 or 86.5%) as their first language, German is the second most common (303 or 3.9%) and Italian is the third (275 or 3.6%). There are 2 people who speak Romansh.

As of 2008, the population was 49.0% male and 51.0% female. The population was made up of 2,777 Swiss men (37.2% of the population) and 885 (11.9%) non-Swiss men. There were 2,940 Swiss women (39.4%) and 864 (11.6%) non-Swiss women. Of the population in the municipality, 2,793 or about 36.3% were born in Moutier and lived there in 2000. There were 1,252 or 16.3% who were born in the same canton, while 1,808 or 23.5% were born somewhere else in Switzerland, and 1,605 or 20.8% were born outside of Switzerland.

As of 2011, children and teenagers (0–19 years old) make up 20.1% of the population, while adults (20–64 years old) make up 59.3% and seniors (over 64 years old) make up 20.6%.

As of 2000, there were 2,925 people who were single and never married in the municipality. There were 3,800 married individuals, 564 widows or widowers and 412 individuals who are divorced.

As of 2010, there were 1,239 households that consist of only one person and 186 households with five or more people. In 2000, a total of 3,369 apartments (87.4% of the total) were permanently occupied, while 286 apartments (7.4%) were seasonally occupied and 198 apartments (5.1%) were empty. As of 2010, the construction rate of new housing units was 0.9 new units per 1000 residents. The vacancy rate for the municipality, in 2012, was 3.59%. In 2011, single family homes made up 51.4% of the total housing in the municipality.

The historical population is given in the following chart:

== Heritage sites of national significance ==
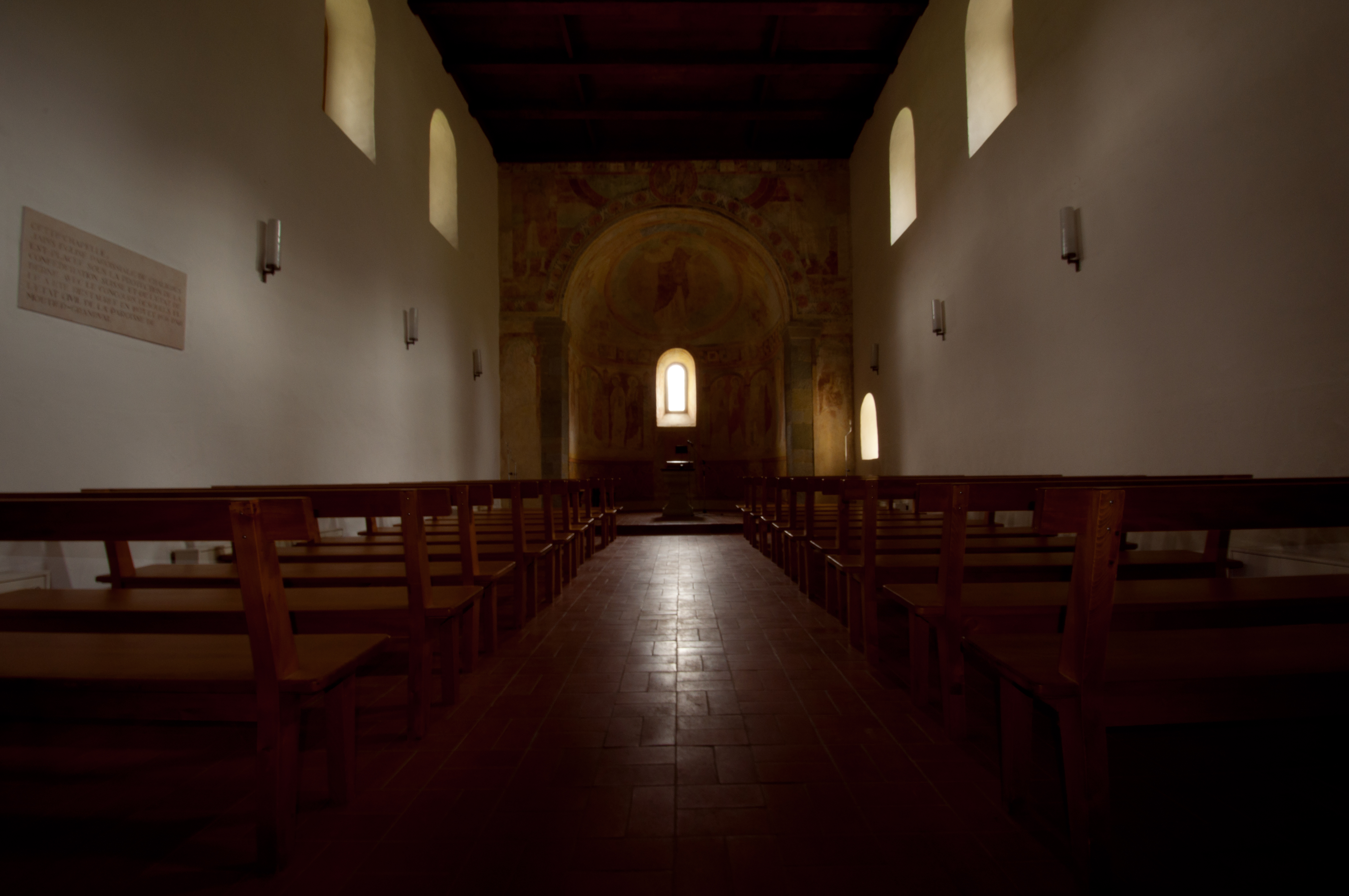
Interior of the Chapelle de Chalière

The chapel and cemetery De Chalière is listed as a Swiss heritage site of national significance. The entire urbanized village of Moutier is part of the Inventory of Swiss Heritage Sites.

== Politics ==
In the 2011 federal election, the most popular party was the Social Democratic Party (SP) which received 23.7% of the vote. The next three most popular parties were the Swiss People's Party (SVP) (22.7%), the Christian Democratic People's Party (CVP) (17.7%) and another local party (15.1%). In the federal election, a total of 1,898 votes were cast, and the voter turnout was 38.2%.

== Economy ==
The area has many factories that produce high-precision machine tools, particularly CNC & CAD/CAM machining centers, including Tornos Bechler SA & Schaublin Machines SA.

As of 2011, Moutier had an unemployment rate of 2.71%. As of 2008, there were a total of 3,916 people employed in the municipality. Of these, there were 46 people employed in the primary economic sector and about 17 businesses involved in this sector. 2,121 people were employed in the secondary sector and there were 114 businesses in this sector. 1,749 people were employed in the tertiary sector, with 262 businesses in this sector. There were 3,845 residents of the municipality who were employed in some capacity, of which females made up 43.4% of the workforce.

In 2008, there were a total of 3,437 full-time equivalent jobs. The number of jobs in the primary sector was 33, of which 31 were in agriculture and 2 were in forestry or lumber production. The number of jobs in the secondary sector was 2,022 of which 1,744 or (86.3%) were in manufacturing and 246 (12.2%) were in construction. The number of jobs in the tertiary sector was 1,382. In the tertiary sector; 306 or 22.1% were in wholesale or retail sales or the repair of motor vehicles, 53 or 3.8% were in the movement and storage of goods, 74 or 5.4% were in a hotel or restaurant, 17 or 1.2% were in the information industry, 56 or 4.1% were the insurance or financial industry, 127 or 9.2% were technical professionals or scientists, 102 or 7.4% were in education and 344 or 24.9% were in health care.

In 2000, there were 2,315 workers who commuted into the municipality and 1,241 workers who commuted away. The municipality is a net importer of workers, with about 1.9 workers entering the municipality for every one leaving. A total of 2,603 workers (53.9% of the 4,825 total workers in the municipality) both lived and worked in Moutier. About 4.0% of the workforce coming into Moutier are coming from outside Switzerland.

Of the working population, 13.2% used public transportation to get to work, and 55.9% used a private car.

In 2011, the average local and cantonal tax rate on a married resident, with two children, of Moutier making 150,000 CHF was 13.2%, while an unmarried resident's rate was 19.4%. For comparison, the rate for the entire canton in the same year, was 14.2% and 22.0%, while the nationwide rate was 12.3% and 21.1% respectively.

In 2009, there were a total of 3,307 tax payers in the municipality. Of that total, 929 made over 75,000 CHF per year. There were 39 people who made between 15,000 and 20,000 per year. The average income of the over 75,000 CHF group in Moutier was 108,914 CHF, while the average across all of Switzerland was 130,478 CHF. In 2011, a total of 7.5% of the population received direct financial assistance from the government.

== Religion ==
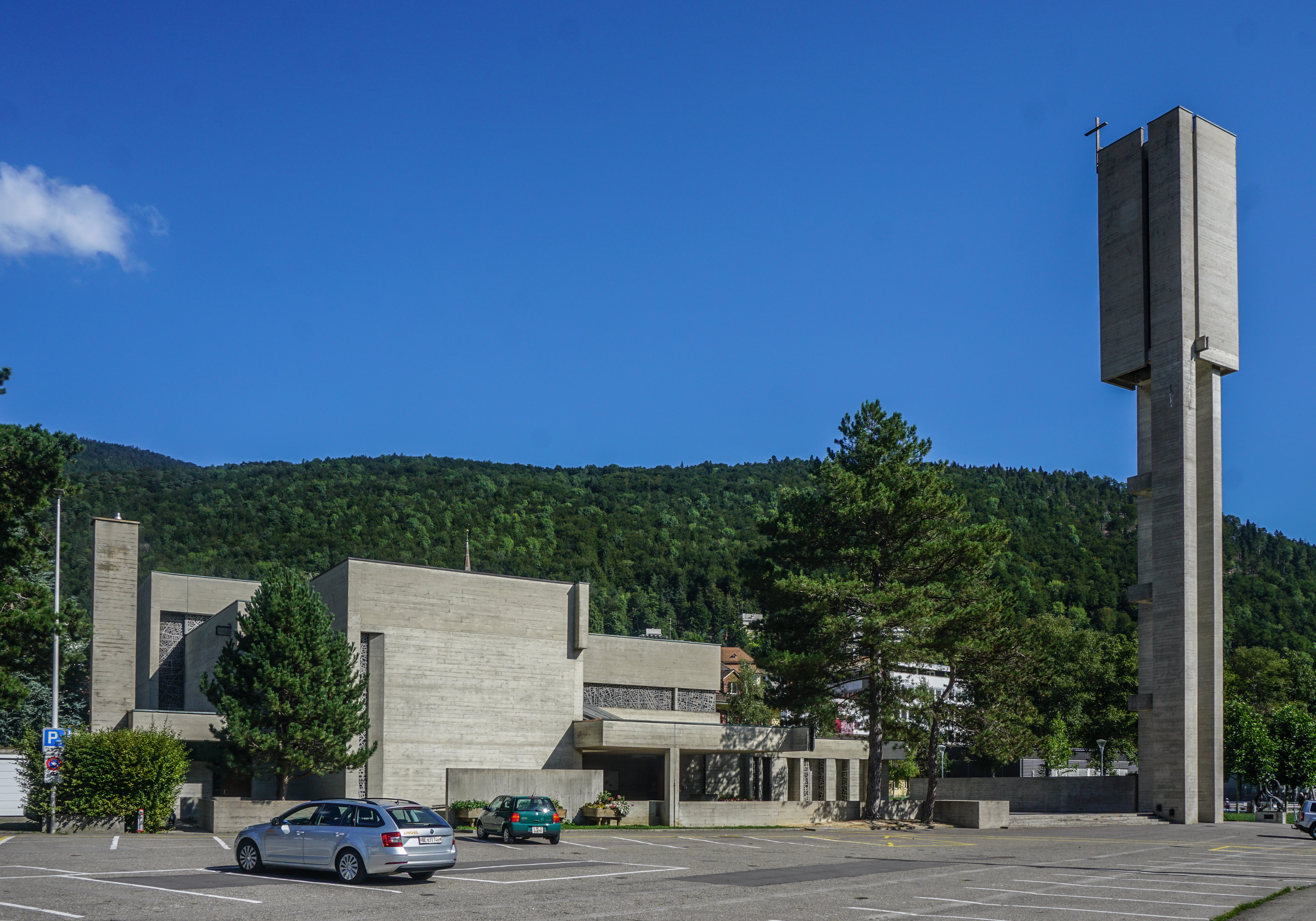
Bell tower of the Notre-Dame de la Prévoté church, built in 1965

From the 2000 census, 3,684 or 47.8% were Roman Catholic, while 2,201 or 28.6% belonged to the Swiss Reformed Church. Of the rest of the population, there were 50 members of an Orthodox church (or about 0.65% of the population), there were 11 individuals (or about 0.14% of the population) who belonged to the Christian Catholic Church, and there were 415 individuals (or about 5.39% of the population) who belonged to another Christian church. There were three individuals (or about 0.04% of the population) who were Jewish, and 266 (or about 3.45% of the population) who were Muslim. There were 15 individuals who were Buddhist, two who were Hindu and three individuals who belonged to another church. A total of 766 (9.95%) residents belonged to no church, were agnostic or atheist. Finally, 285 individuals (3.70%) did not answer the question.

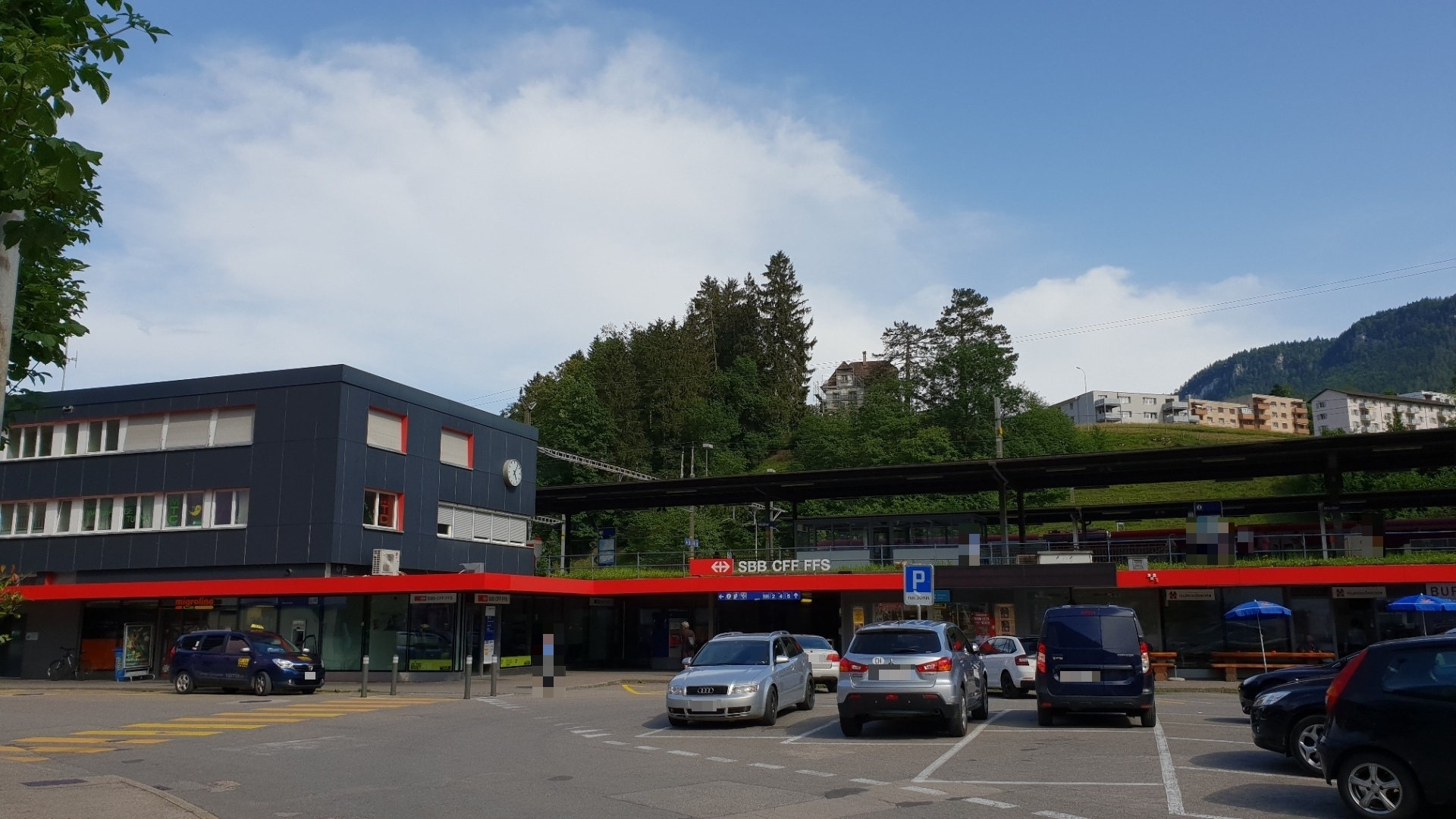
Moutier railway station

== Transport ==
Moutier railway station sits at the junction of three railway lines: Basel–Biel/Bienne, Solothurn–Moutier, and Sonceboz-Sombeval–Moutier. It is served by regional and long-distance trains.

== Climate ==
Between 1981 and 2010 Moutier had an average of 136 days of rain or snow per year and on average received 1,118 mm (44.0 in) of precipitation. The wettest month was May during which time Moutier received an average of 112 mm (4.4 in) of rain or snow. During this month there was precipitation for an average of 13.5 days. The driest month of the year was February with an average of 75 mm (3.0 in) of precipitation over 10.4 days.

== Education ==
In Moutier about 48.6% of the population have completed non-mandatory upper secondary education, and 14.8% have completed additional higher education (either university or a Fachhochschule). Of the 721 who had completed some form of tertiary schooling listed in the census, 61.4% were Swiss men, 22.9% were Swiss women, 8.6% were non-Swiss men and 7.1% were non-Swiss women. The Canton of Bern school system provides one year of non-obligatory Kindergarten, followed by six years of Primary school. This is followed by three years of obligatory lower Secondary school where the students are separated according to ability and aptitude. Following the lower Secondary students may attend additional schooling or they may enter an apprenticeship.

During the 2011–12 school year, there were a total of 918 students attending classes in Moutier. There were 8 kindergarten classes with a total of 144 students in the municipality. Of the kindergarten students, 27.8% were permanent or temporary residents of Switzerland (not citizens) and 22.9% have a different mother language than the classroom language. The municipality had 27 primary classes and 456 students. Of the primary students, 32.9% were permanent or temporary residents of Switzerland (not citizens) and 15.6% have a different mother language than the classroom language. During the same year, there were 17 lower secondary classes with a total of 318 students. There were 29.2% who were permanent or temporary residents of Switzerland (not citizens) and 27.0% have a different mother language than the classroom language.

As of 2000, there were a total of 1,207 students attending any school in the municipality. Of those, 930 both lived and attended school in the municipality, while 277 students came from another municipality. During the same year, 204 residents attended schools outside the municipality.

Moutier is home to the Bibliothèque régionale library.

== Notable people ==
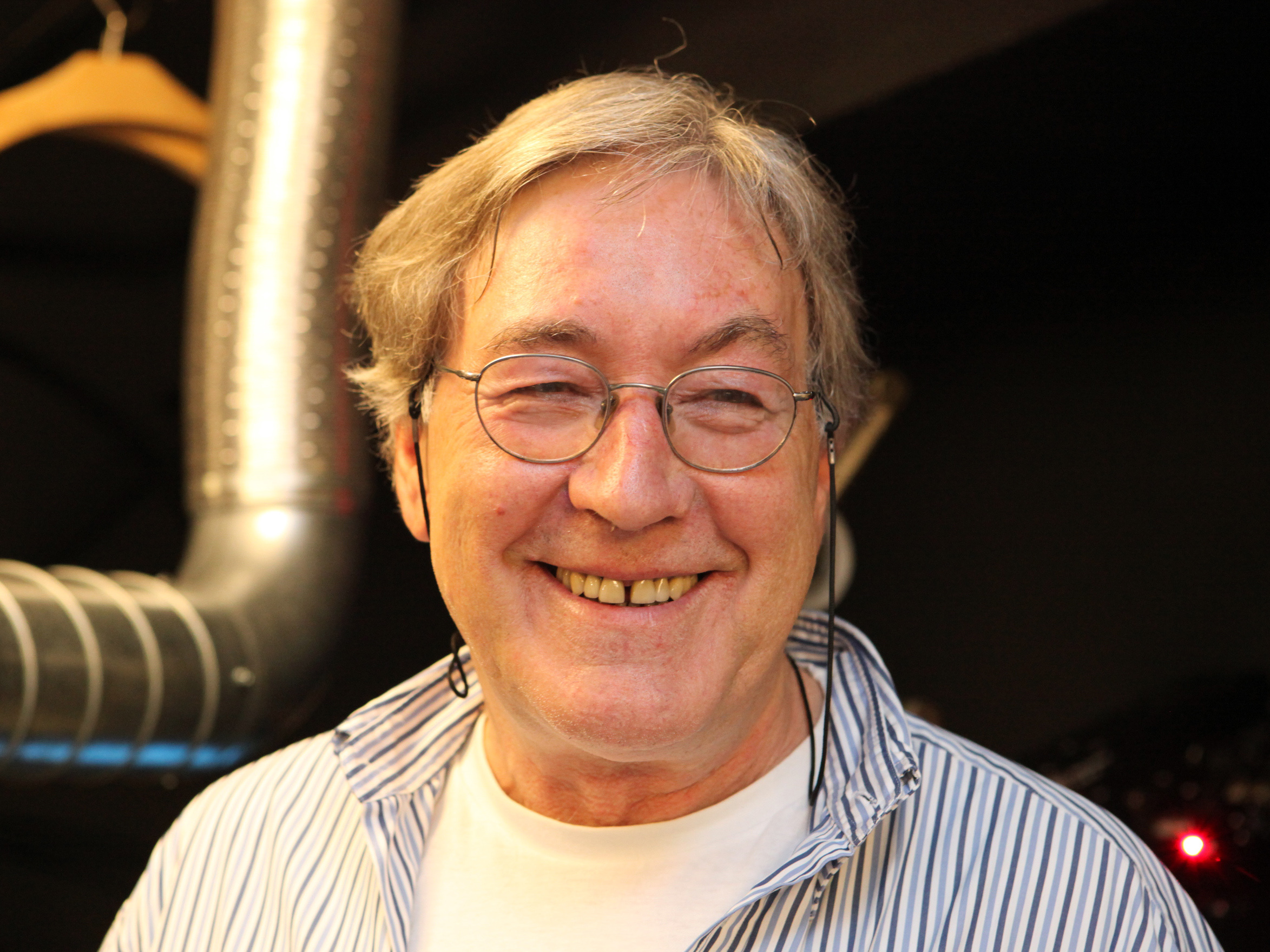
Jean-Claude Wicky, 2010

- John Bost (1817–1881), Calvinist pastor, musician and social pioneer
- Robert Hippolyte Chodat (1865-1934), botanist and pharmacist
- Paul-Otto Bessire (1880-1958), historian
- Jean-Claude Schindelholz (born 1940), 1966 FIFA World Cup footballer
- Charles Kleiber (born 1942), former government official
- Jean-Claude Wicky (1946–2016), photographer and filmmaker
- Mauro Poggia (born 1959), politician and lawyer
- Romain Crevoisier (born 1965), former goalkeeper
- Sébastien Schneeberger (born 1973), Canadian politician, emigrated aged 10
- Lionel Friedli (born 1975), jazz percussionist
- Cyndie Allemann (born 1986), racing driver
