= Alexandre Voisard =

Swiss writer and politician (1930–2024)

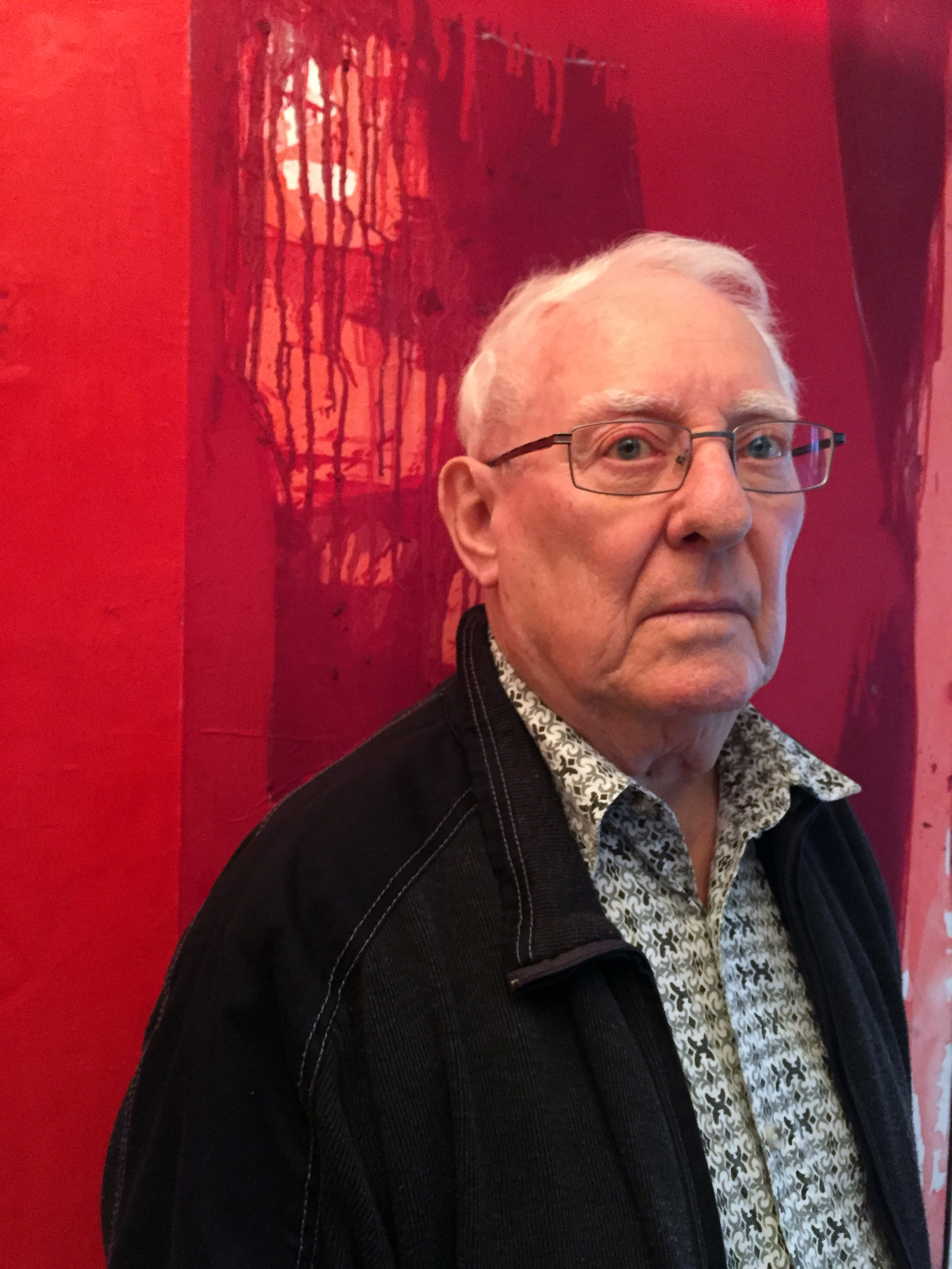
- Voisard in 2016

Member of the Parliament of Jura
- In office 1979–1983

Personal details
- Born: 14 September 1930 Porrentruy, Jura, Switzerland
- Died: 15 October 2024 (aged 94) Porrentruy, Jura, Switzerland
- Party: PS
- Occupation: Writer

Alexandre Voisard (14 September 1930 – 15 October 2024) was a Swiss writer and politician of the Socialist Party (PS). In 1992, he moved to France, living in Courtelevant.

== Biography ==
Born in Porrentruy on 14 September 1930, Voisard had a tumultuous childhood. At the age of 20, he moved to Geneva and lived a bohemian lifestyle. However, he returned to his home canton of Jura and wrote his first books, Écrit sur un mur and Vert Paradis. In 1957, he married Thérèse Laval, with whom he would have five children. The couple ran a bookstore while Voisard continued his literary pursuits.

Voisard joined the Rassemblement jurassien in 1947 and was a figure in Jura separatism. His poem, Liberté à l'Aube, was read during the creation of the Canton of Jura. He was appointed a cultural delegate for the new Canton and promoted its culture and arts through his association with Pro Helvetia. From 1979 to 1983, he was a member of the Parliament of Jura. In 1990, Voisard was elected to the Académie Mallarmé in Paris. In 1997, he joined the Académie européenne de poésie.

Voisard died on 15 October 2024, at the age of 94.

== Publications ==
- Écrit sur un Mur (1954)
- Vert Paradis (1955)
- Chronique du guet (1961)
- Liberté à l'aube (1967)
- Les Deux Versants de la solitude (1969)
- Louve (1972)
- La Nuit en miettes (1975)
- Je ne sais pas si vous savez (1975)
- Un Train peut en cacher un autre (1979)
- La Claire Voyante (1981)
- Les Rescapés et autres poèmes (1984)
- L'Année des treize lunes (1984)
- Toutes les vies vécues (1989)
- Le Dire Le Faire (1991)
- Maîtres et valets entre deux orages (1993)
- Une enfance de fond en comble (1993)
- Le Repentir du Peintre (1995)
- Le Déjeu (1997)
- Au rendez-vous des alluvions (1997)
- Sauver sa trace (2000)
- Quelques fourmis sur la plage (2001)
- Fables des orées et des rues (2003)
- L'Adieu aux abeilles et autres nouvelles (2003)
- Le Mot musique ou l'Enfance d'un poète (2004)
- De Cime et d'abîme (2007)
- Dans la fièvre du migrant (2007)
- L’Intégrale (2007)
- Émergence (2010)
- La Poésie en chemins de ronde (2010)
- Autour de liberté à l'aube. Correspondance 1967-1972 (2010)
- Accrues. Carnets 1999-2008 (2011)
- Silves (2011)
- Le Poète coupé en deux (2012)
- Derrière la lampe (2012)
- Oiseau de Hasard (2013)
- Les petites Heures de Jean la Paille suivi de l'Oracle des quatre jeudis (2014)
- Ajours (2017)
- Notre-Dame des égarées (2017)
- L'ordinaire et l'aubaine des mots (2020)

== Awards ==
- Youth prize of the Société jurassienne d'émulation (1950)
- Literary prize of the Société jurassienne d'émulation (1955)
- Prix du Jura libre (1967)
- Schiller Prize (1969)
- Schiller Prize (1994)
- Prix Alain-Bosquet (2011)
- Prix Renfer (2015)
- Prix des auditeurs de la RTS (2018)
