= 2025 Jura cantonal election =

- Government election
- 19 October 2025 (first round); 9 November 2025 (second round)
- Turnout: 41.5% (first round); 45.7% (second round)
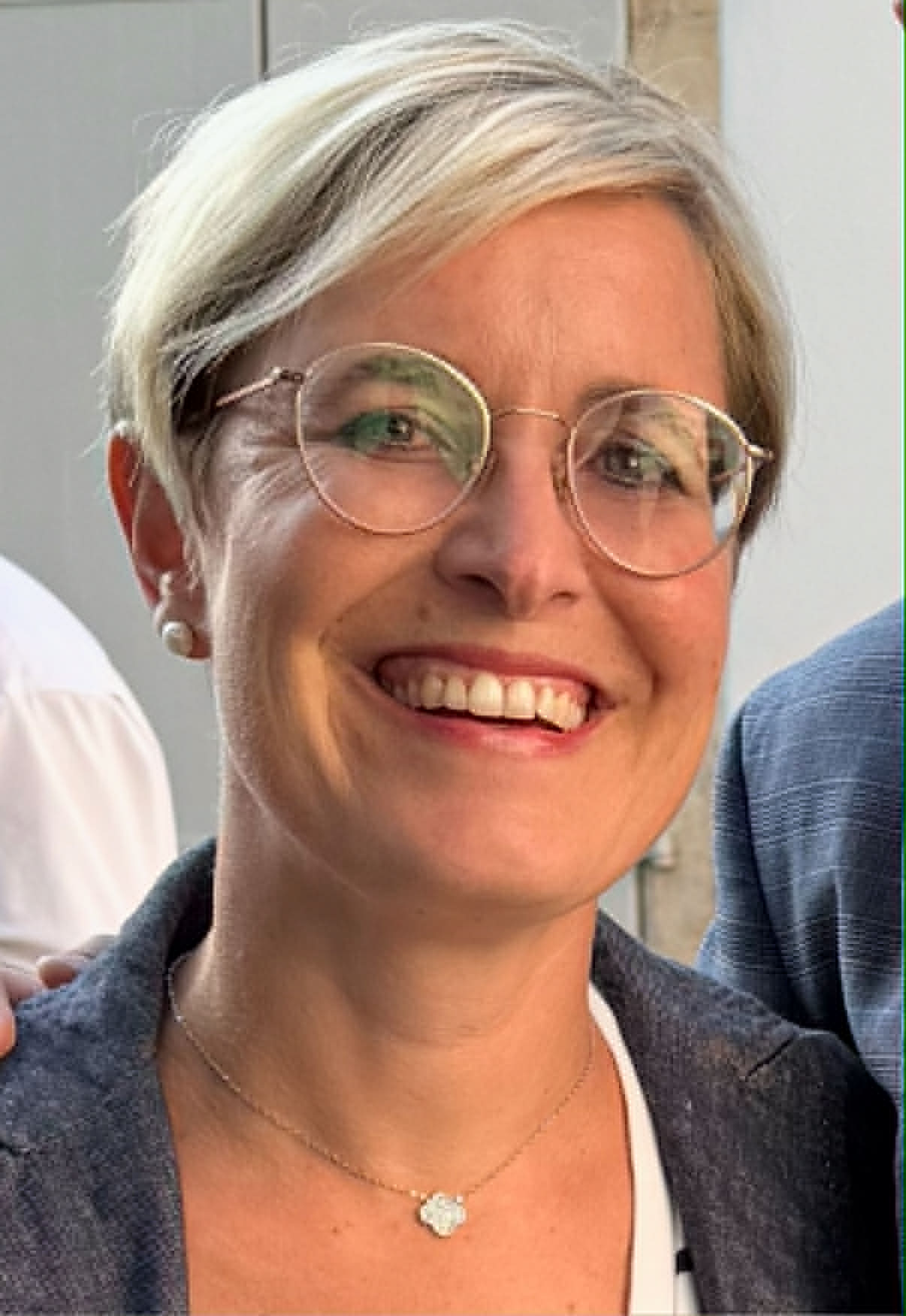
Candidate	Rosalie Beuret Siess	Stéphane Theurillat	Raphaël Ciocchi
Party	Social Democratic Party of Switzerland	The Centre	Social Democratic Party of Switzerland
Popular vote	14,647	13,491	12,181
Percentage	48.6%	44.8%	40.4%
Candidate	Valentin Zuber	Jean-Paul Lachat	Fred-Henri Schnegg
Party	Social Democratic Party of Switzerland	The Centre	Swiss People's Party
Popular vote	10,747	10,747	9,839
Percentage	35.7%	33.6%	32.6%
Candidate	Martial Courtet	Damien Chappuis	Martin Braichet
Party	Independent	Christian Social Party	The Liberals
Popular vote	8,918	6,630	4,991
Percentage	29.6%	22.0%	16.6%
Ministers before election
Martial Courtet (LC)
Nathalie Barthoulot (PS)
David Eray (PCSI)
Rosalie Beuret Siess (PS)
Stéphane Theurillat (LC)
Elected Ministers
Rosalie Beuret Siess (PS)
Stéphane Theurillat (LC)
Raphaël Ciocchi (PS)
Valentin Zuber (PS)
Jean-Paul Lachat (LC)
- Parliament of Jura
- All 60 seats in the Parliament of Jura; 31 seats needed for a majority
Party	Leader	Vote %	Seats	+/–
The Centre	Mathieu Cerf	26.80%	17	+2
SP/PS	Raphaël Ciocchi	22.08%	16	+3
UDC	Alain Koller	15.24%	11	+4
PLR	Martin Braichet	11.90%	6	−2
PCSI	Sophie Guenot-Vallat	10.05%	5	−1
Greens	Pauline Godat	7.98%	4	−3
POP	Pierluigi Fedele	4.57%	1	−1
PVL	Didier Receveur	2.34%	0	−2
This lists parties that won seats. See the complete results below.

The 2025 Jura cantonal election was held on October 19, 2025, and November 9, 2025, for elected the new members of the government and the Parliament of Republic and Canton of Jura.

== Background ==
The configuration of the Parliament of Jura was changed due to the transfert of Moutier in the Canton. The new distribution of seat is 26 for Delémont District, 18 for Porrentruy District, 9 for Franches-Montagnes District and 7 for Moutier District.

== Election ==
For the first time in the history of Jura, the Social Democratic Party of Switzerland has a majority in the government.
