= Charles Juillard =

Swiss politician

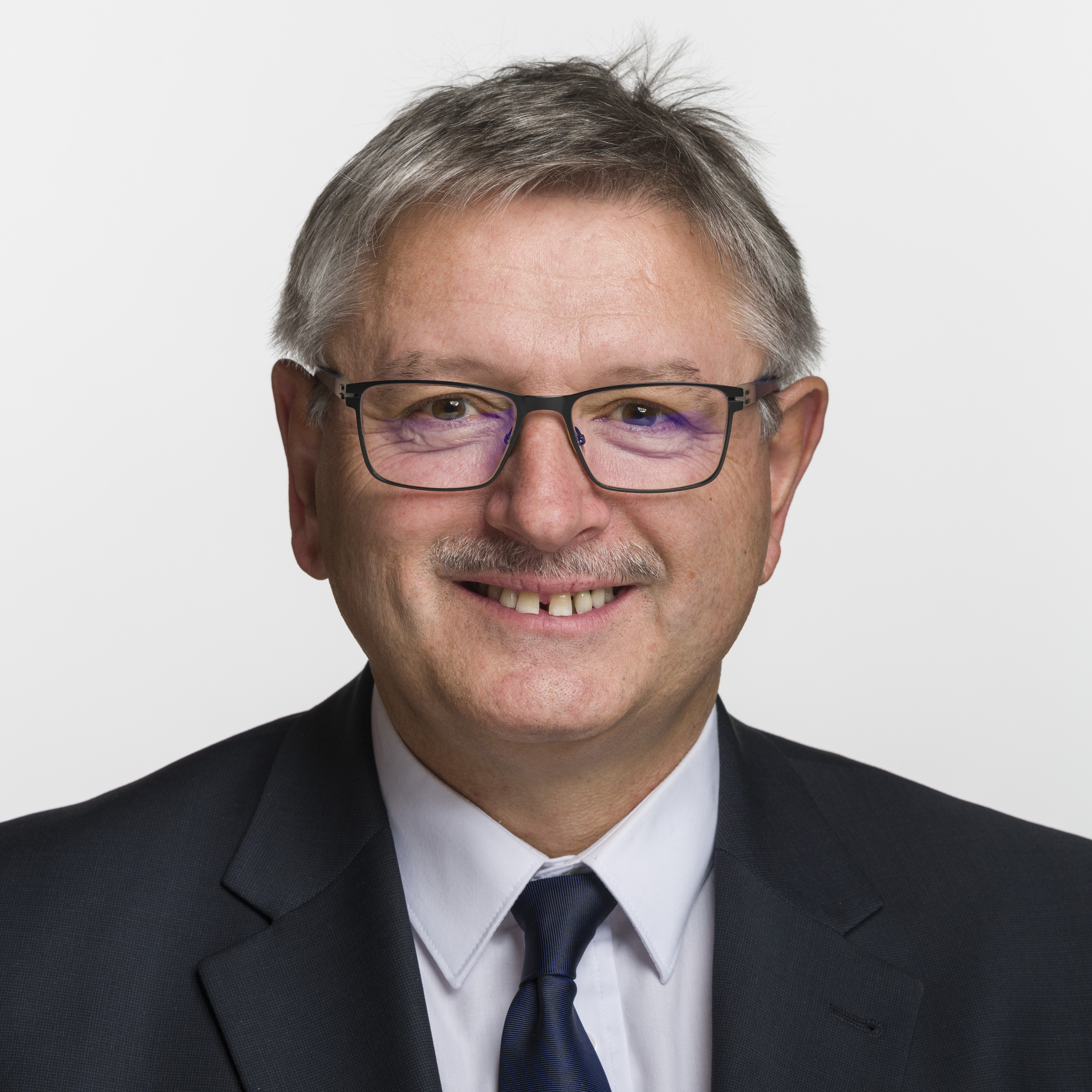

Member of the Council of States of Switzerland
- Incumbent
- Assumed office 2 December 2019
- Constituency: Republic and Canton of Jura

3rd Minister of Finance, Justice and Police of Republic and Canton of Jura
- In office 1 January 2007 – 1 December 2019
- Preceded by: Gérald Schaller
- Succeeded by: Rosalie Beuret Siess

32nd, 34th and 36th President of Government of Republic and Canton of Jura
- In office 1 January 2016 – 31 December 2016
- Preceded by: Michel Thentz
- Succeeded by: Nathalie Barthoulot
- In office 1 January 2014 – 31 December 2014
- Preceded by: Michel Probst
- Succeeded by: Michel Thentz
- In office 1 January 2010 – 31 December 2010
- Preceded by: Michel Probst
- Succeeded by: Philippe Receveur

31st and 33rd Vice President of Government of Republic and Canton of Jura
- In office 1 January 2013 – 31 December 2013
- Preceded by: Michel Probst
- Succeeded by: Michel Thentz
- In office 1 January 2009 – 31 December 2009
- Preceded by: Michel Probst
- Succeeded by: Philippe Receveur

37th President of Parliament of Jura
- In office 1 January 2006 – 31 December 2006
- Preceded by: Alain Schweingruber
- Succeeded by: Nathalie Barthoulot

Member of the Parliament of Jura
- In office 1 January 1998 – 31 December 2006

Personal details
- Born: 17 December 1962 (age 63) Porrentruy, Switzerland
- Party: The Centre
- Children: 3

Charles Juillard (born 17 December 1962) is a Swiss politician who is a member of the Council of States of Switzerland and former Minister and President of the Republic and Canton of Jura.

== Biography ==
Juillard served in the military. He was elected in 2019 in the Council of States of Switzerland for the constituency of Republic and Canton of Jura.

He previously served as Minister of Finance, Justice and Police in the Government and he was President in 2010, 2014 and 2016.
