= Jura autonomist movement =

Autonomist political movement in the Swiss Jura region

Mouvement autonomiste jurassien (MAJ)
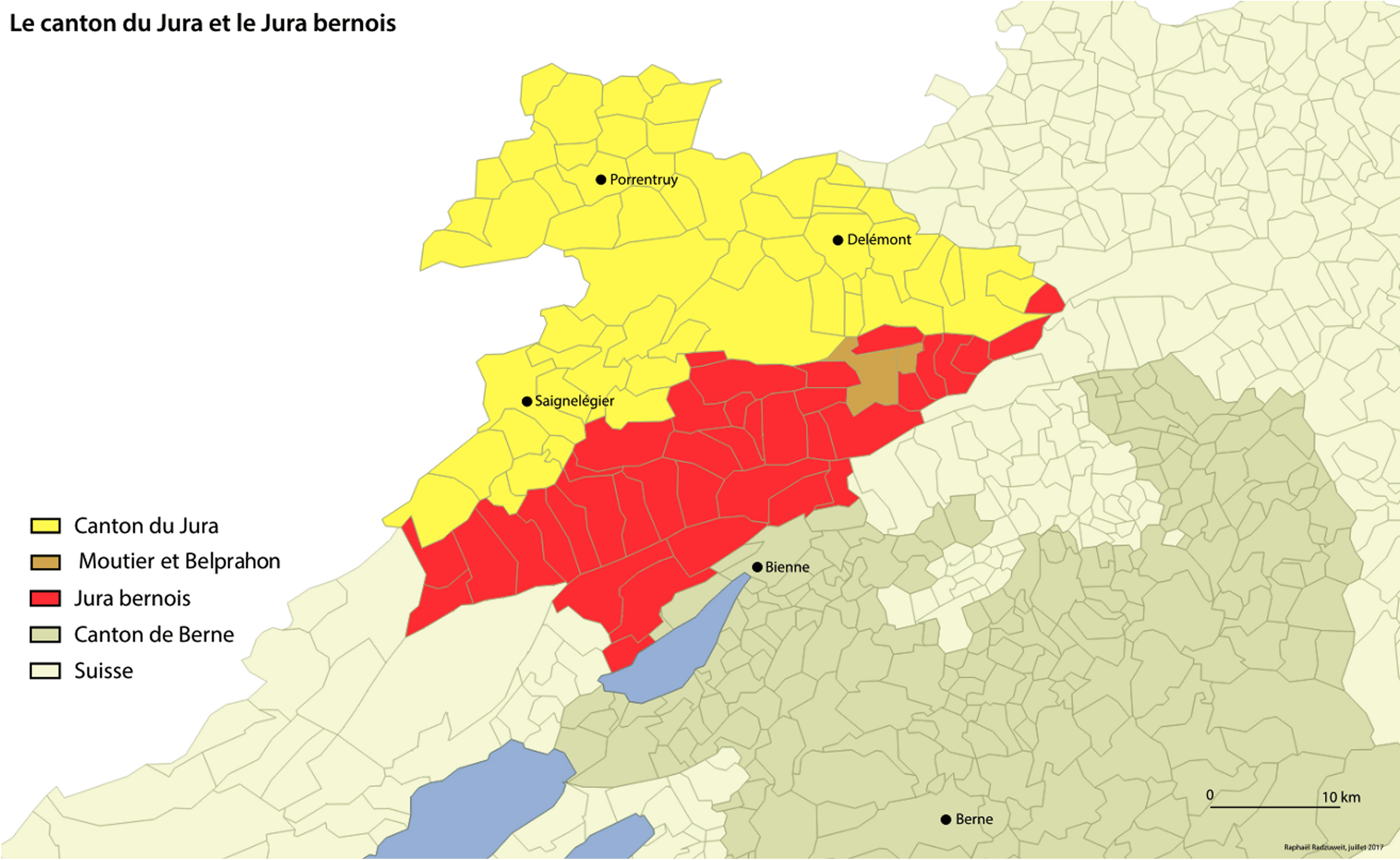
- The Canton of Jura, the Bernese Jura (southern Jura) as well as Moutier and Belprahon which are currently at the centre of the Jura separatism.
- Predecessor: First Jurassian Separatist Movement (1917)
- Formation: November 30, 1947
- Type: Autonomist and separatist organisation
- Headquarters: Delémont (1947–1994) Moutier (since 1994)
- Location: Switzerland:
- Coordinates: 47°16′52″N 7°22′51″E
- Members: 3,500
- Official language: French
- President: Pierre-Alain Fridez
- General Secretary: Pierre-André Comte
- Key people: Daniel Charpilloz Roland Béguelin
- Website: www.maj.ch
- Formerly called: Mouvement séparatiste jurassien (1947–1951); Rassemblement jurassien (1951–1994); March 20, 1994

The Jura Autonomist Movement (MAJ)—known successively as the Jura Separatist Movement (MSJ) from 1947 to 1951, then as the Jura Rally (RJ) from 1951 to 1994 – is an autonomist and separatist organization comprising several entities such as Unité jurassienne (UJ), Groupe Bélier (until 1981), Mouvement universitaire jurassien (MUJ), Association féminine pour la défense du Jura (AFDJ) and Association des Jurassiens de l’extérieur (AJE).

Throughout its history, the MAJ has been a significant organisation involved with the Jura Question. Founded in 1947 at the initiative of Daniel Charpilloz, the movement initially supported efforts for the historic Jura region to separate from the canton of Bern. It later focused on promoting the reunification of the Bernese Jura with the Republic and Canton of Jura, which became a sovereign canton in 1979. Today, the MAJ continues to participate in issues relating to the historic Jura region, including matters of regional identity and institutional status.

== Objectives ==
When it was founded in 1947, the Jura separatist movement set itself the goal of separating the people and territory of Jura from the canton of Bern to create a new canton within the Swiss Confederation;;. Its statutes stipulated that the organization had "the aim of freeing the Jura people from Bernese domination.

Following the Jura plebiscite of 1974–1975, which resulted in the creation of the Republic and Canton of Jura consisting of only three of the seven historic districts, the MAJ redefined its goals. Although it retained its desire to free the Jura people from what it regarded as Bernese domination, its action now focused exclusively on the Bernese Jura (which it designated as Southern Jura). The organization then directed its struggle toward the reunification of the former Bernese districts of Moutier, Courtelary, and La Neuveville with the canton of Jura, thereby continuing its commitment to the unity of the historic Jura territory.

Since 2025, in the context marked by the constitutional end of the Jura question and the official integration of the town of Moutier into the Republic and Canton of Jura, the MAJ has undertaken a revision of its statutes and goals. Aware that the traditional notion of "reunification" no longer corresponds to the current institutional reality, the MAJ has adapted its action to a new phase of inter-Jura dialogue. This is no longer based on a logic of territorial confrontation, but on the promotion of cultural, linguistic, and identity ties uniting the people of Jura from both cantons. The organization now states that it "the aim of freeing the Jura people from Bernese domination".

== History ==
Jurassian Separatist Movement (MSJ) (April 24, 1917 – c. 1930)
Jurassian Separatist Movement (MSJ) (November 30, 1947 – September 9, 1951); Rassemblement jurassien (RJ) (September 9, 1951 – March 20, 1994)	Unité jurassienne (UJ) (May 21, 1976 – March 20, 1994)
Jurassian Autonomist Movement (MAJ) (since March 20, 1994)

=== First Jurassian Separatist Movement (1917–1930) ===
On April 24, 1917, the first Jurassian Separatist Movement (MSJ) was founded under the presidency of Albert Eberhardt, who, faced with threats, had to resign. He was then replaced by Louis Merlin. Alfred Ribeaud, becoming the main animator of the movement, presented the Jura question to the whole of Switzerland and launched the idea of creating a canton of Jura, stating: "We want to break the chain that binds us...and nothing can stop us, neither the knights of the gravy train nor the entire bear pit. We are ready!". He published several politically engaged texts, including Au temps des cerises (In the Time of Cherries), La Question jurassienne (The Jura Question) and Nous voulons l'autonomie (We Want Autonomy). At that point, the MSJ set about forming a committee for the creation of a canton of Jura, structured around an executive commission. However, the project came to nothing. This first movement failed in part because its initiators were isolated, cut off from the working classes.

At the same time, other separatist movements also emerged during this period.

=== Second Jurassian Separatist Movement (1947–1951) ===
On 27 September 1947, following the Moeckli affair, Norbert Clémence, Roland Béguelin, Daniel Charpilloz, Georges Membrez, Victor Beuchat, Roger Schaffter, Jean Chappuis, and Marc Jobin met in Porrentruy with the intention of creating a broad protest movement against the Bernese executive council.

On 30 November 1947, the Jura Separatist Movement (MSJ) was established at the Hôtel de la Gare in Moutier, on the initiative of Daniel Charpilloz, Roland Béguelin, Roger Schaffter, and 19 others. Daniel Charpilloz became its first president, Roger Schaffter took the position of general secretary, and the movement's headquarters was established in Delémont. The MSJ openly advocated for the separation of the Jura territory from the canton of Bern and the creation of a new canton within the Swiss Confederation, comprising the seven districts of Delémont, Porrentruy, Franches-Montagnes, Moutier, Courtelary, La Neuveville, and Laufen.

Shortly thereafter, on 6 February 1948, Roland Béguelin, Roger Schaffter, and Roger Chatelain founded the cooperative society Le Jura Libre. Roger Schaffter became its first editor-in-chief.

The Jura separatist movement sought to widely publicize its plan for cantonal separation among the entire population of Jura. To this end, it distributed leaflets, canvassed for support, and organized demonstrations. On February 18, 1948, it held the first Jura People's Festival, which subsequently became an annual event. On March 6, 1948, the MSJ held its first public demonstration in Sonceboz-Sombeval.

On 12 September 1949, the Bernese authorities submit several proposals for amendments to the cantonal Constitution to address the emerging demands and defuse the Jura conflict. These proposals include the recognition of a "Jura people", respect for linguistic parity in administrative acts, the guarantee of Jura representation on the Bernese Executive Council, as well as constitutional protection measures for the region. These amendments are submitted to a vote on 29 October 1950, and are accepted by 69,089 votes to 7,289.

Despite this popular approval, the MSJ considers these reforms largely insufficient. To unite all Jura residents around the independence ideal, Roland Béguelin launches a rallying operation. With Roger Schaffter, he adapts the popular Ajoie song La Rauracienne, modifies the lyrics, and renames it La Nouvelle Rauracienne, which from then on becomes the anthem of the separatists.

Following the departure of Roger Schaffter, recently appointed director of the Swiss School in Genoa, the Central Committee of the Movement is reorganized: Pierre Billieux becomes general secretary, Adolf Walther accedes to the central vice-presidency, and Roland Béguelin takes over the editorship of Jura Libre.

On 9 September 1951, in an effort to affirm its apolitical and non-denominational character, the Jurassian separatist movement changed its name and became the Rassemblement jurassien (RJ).

=== Rassemblement jurassien (1951–1994) ===
Having become the Rassemblement jurassien, the movement continued its actions in the 1950s with firmness but without aggression, affirming its desire to create a Republic and Canton of Jura in accordance with the principles of Swiss federalism.

As early as 1955, the RJ raised the possibility of launching an initiative, either federal or cantonal, on the right to self-determination for the seven Jurassian districts. A major obstacle arose, however: the case of the Laufen District, which had a German-speaking majority. The RJ then considered a special status for this district within a future Jurassian canton.

On 3 August 1957, the RJ announced the launch of a cantonal initiative "with a view to organizing in the Jura a popular consultation on the problem of autonomy". The initiative was officially launched on 1 September and collected 23,336 signatures before being deposited with the Bernese Chancellery. It was submitted to a popular vote in the canton of Bern on 5 July 1959 (Note: The Action Committee for the Safeguarding of the Interests of the District of Laufen distanced itself from the Rassemblement jurassien's initiative in favor of organizing a plebiscite.).

The RJ then suffered an electoral setback: in the Jura itself, the initiative was rejected by 16,354 no votes against 15,163 yes votes, or 51.9% against 48.1%. At the level of the canton of Bern, the majority also opposed it, although three of the seven Jurassian districts voted in favor of the text. The RJ attributed this failure to the massive immigration of German-speakers during the 19th century, which it accused of having altered the demographic balance and influenced the vote. It also claimed that the vote had been conducted according to Bernese law, deemed unfavorable to the interests of the Jurassian people. Despite the failure, the movement reaffirmed its determination to continue the struggle.

Despite the failure of the 1959 initiative, the RJ did not give up. Under the impetus of its leaders, particularly Roland Béguelin, the movement underwent a profound restructuring. It intensified demonstrations and field actions, and resolutely focused on youth to renew its commitment.

In 1960, the RJ planned to launch four new cantonal initiatives aimed at improving living conditions in the Jura: the creation of a road traffic office in Tavannes, the establishment of a pilot farm in the Franches-Montagnes District, tax relief for families, as well as the abolition of the proxy voting system. These four initiatives were submitted to the people on 27 May 1962 and all rejected.

At the same time, the RJ founded several activist groups designed to mobilize different segments of the Jura population: young people joined the Béliers, university students engaged in the Mouvement universitaire jurassien (MUJ), women in the Association féminine pour la défense du Jura (AFDJ), and expatriates in the Association des Jurassiens de l’extérieur (AJE).

Since the early 1960s, the Jurassian delegation in the Bernese Grand Council has been advocating for a referendum on Jura autonomy. However, in September 1964, the Rassemblement jurassien came out against this move, arguing that such a plebiscite should not be organized by the canton of Bern, which the separatists were fighting against, but by the Swiss Confederation. Moreover, the RJ demanded voting rights for all Jura residents living outside the canton. It emphasized that organizing a plebiscite by the Canton of Bern would merely repeat the popular vote of 5 July 1959 and, consequently, announced that it would call on Jurassians to boycott this ballot and ignore its result.

From 1962, the period of the "years of embers" began, marked by an intensification of tensions between Jurassian separatists and supporters of integration into the Canton of Bern, reaching their peak. This era was characterized by scuffles, threats against political officials, boycotts of businesses and restaurants belonging to opponents, acts of vandalism, damage to flags, as well as protests and attacks targeting infrastructure.

On 17 March 1967, the Bernese Executive Council presented a plan aimed at resolving the Jura question. This plan provided that if negotiations on an autonomy status failed, a plebiscite could be organized to allow the Jurassian people to decide on their future: remain in the Canton of Bern or form a new canton. Separatist circles, however, believed that such a plebiscite could not resolve the Jurassian problem and insisted on the need for federal mediation. Faced with this possibility, the inhabitants of the German-speaking district of Laufen decided to seize the opportunity. Thus, a separatist movement, Laufen zu Basel, was created, advocating the attachment of this district to the neighboring canton of Basel-Landschaft. The Rassemblement jurassien, for its part, readjusted its objectives and accepted the idea of a Jura canton composed only of the six French-speaking districts, thereby abandoning the integration of the Laufen district. It recognized the right of self-determination of the inhabitants of Laufen and supported their right to decide on their future.

Negotiations thus began with a view to establishing an autonomy status for the Jura within the Canton of Bern. On 16 June 1967, the Bernese Executive Council created the "Commission of Twenty-Four", composed of twelve Bernese members and twelve Jurassians, under the presidency of the Bernese State Councillor and police director, Robert Bauder. The mission of this commission was to draw up a list of Jurassian demands. The commission's report, entitled Les données actuelles du problème jurassien, was presented on 3 April 1968. The first part of the report sought to demonstrate that the Jurassian minority enjoys a situation that is altogether enviable within the Canton of Bern[n4]. The second part traced "the contacts made between the Commission and the various Jurassian actors in order to present an overview of the different positions regarding the Jura question". These efforts included interviews with the Rassemblement jurassien, the Union des Patriotes jurassiens (UPJ), the Groupement interpartis pour l'unité cantonale (GIPUC), as well as with the prefects of the Jura and Biel/Bienne, the municipalities of Biel/Bienne and Laufen, and representatives of economic, cultural, university, and religious associations. However, even before its publication, the report was the subject of lively discussions within the Delegation of the Executive Council for Jurassian Affairs (DCEAJ), which closely monitored its development. The "Commission of Twenty-Four" thus did not benefit from total independence in its efforts vis-à-vis the Bernese Executive Council. As a result, separatist movements remained distrustful of this report and chose to ignore it.

Meanwhile, convinced that an autonomy status remained the most appropriate solution to resolve the Jura question, the Bernese Executive Council sought the help of the Confederation. On the proposal of the Federal Council, on July 16, 1968, the Commission confédérée de bons offices pour le Jura (CBO) (also known as the "Petitpierre Commission") was appointed, tasked with attempting to resolve the Jura problem. This commission was composed of two former Federal Councillors, Max Petitpierre and Friedrich Traugott Wahlen, as well as two National Councillors, Pierre Graber and Raymond Broger. The discussions between the commission and the Bernese Executive Council mainly focused on the choice between organising a plebiscite or developing a new status for the Jura.

For the CBO, two essential elements had to be taken into account. On the one hand, it was essential that Jurassians could choose between separation from the canton of Bern or a new status for the Jura, which would have to be developed before a plebiscite was organised. On the other hand, given the three forces present in the Jura – North Jura, South Jura, and Laufonnais – it seemed necessary that, after the popular vote on separation, Jurassians could organise other votes in the districts where the majority of voters would not support the result of the first vote. This is how the idea of "cascading plebiscites" was born. The CBO's first report was published on May 13, 1969, in which it mentioned "the gathering of Jurassians of all tendencies towards a broad autonomy status that would be obtained, or even imposed, on the canton of Bern".

Under pressure from various circles, including the Confederation, the Bernese Executive Council presented, on July 2, 1969, its draft of "new constitutional provisions relating to the Jura", which proposed either a special autonomy status for the Jura region within the canton of Bern or independence. Contrary to the CBO's demands, the Bernese Executive Council informed the population that plebiscites likely to lead to possible Jura independence could not be organised until the amendment on the "new constitutional provisions relating to the Jura" was definitively accepted, citing "time constraints". The draft was unanimously adopted by the Bernese Grand Council on September 9, 1969, and submitted to a popular vote in the entire canton the following year.

The Rassemblement jurassien initially announced its rejection of the "new constitutional provisions relating to the Jura" and called on its members to vote against this proposal in the popular vote. It believed that the results would favour the Bernese Executive Council rather than the separatists. Although acceptance of these "new constitutional provisions relating to the Jura" would open the way to organising a Jura plebiscite (the main objective of the separatists), the RJ feared that this plebiscite, organised by the canton of Bern, would lead to the partition of the Jura territory (Note: The RJ believed that it should be organised by the Confederation and not by "the dominant power from which one should be able to separate", namely the canton of Bern.). The RJ demanded the application of international rules governing the organisation of the plebiscite under the right to self-determination, stipulating that the entire Jura people, both inhabitants of the territory and those living in other cantons, should be able to vote. However, the canton of Bern relied on the Federal Constitution, which states in article 43 that "all inhabitants of a canton or municipality who have resided there for at least three months may participate in a vote". The RJ then accused the Bernese authorities of influencing the vote result by allowing people of German-speaking origin to participate, to ensure a result favourable to Bern.

However, at the end of 1969, the Rassemblement jurassien changed its mind and approved the constitutional amendment as presented by the Bernese Executive Council. This reversal was motivated by the fact that, for the first time, the plebiscite presented a real opportunity for Jurassians to exercise their right to self-determination, even if it meant renouncing part of their historical territory:

The Bernese plan must be approved despite everything, because it gives Jurassians the right to self-determination. It is a step not to be missed, even if we do not agree with the modalities of applying the self-determination vote.

— Roland Béguelin, general secretary of the Rassemblement jurassien

The constitutional amendment was then submitted to the popular vote in the canton on March 1, 1970. To the question

Do you accept the amendment relating to the new constitutional provisions concerning the Jura?

86.47% of the Bernese electorate responded favourably, or 90,358 votes against 14,133. The participation rate was 37.8%. In the Jura part of the canton, the result was 20,421 votes against 2,259. The law came into force on March 10 following. On September 7, 1971, the CBO published its second report, in which it proposed an autonomy status for the Jura. This report marked a sharp reversal compared to the first report of 1969, particularly regarding the organisation of a plebiscite, which deteriorated relations with the Rassemblement jurassien, which demanded the immediate dissolution of the commission (Note: The commission remained in place, secretly, until 1974.). Naturally opposed to Jura independence, the Bernese Executive Council presented, in September 1972, its "Report of the Executive Council to the Grand Council on the creation of regions and the development of the Jura status", which proposed a regionalisation of the entire canton, orienting towards the idea of a special autonomy status for the Jura region within the canton of Bern. The RJ and the MUJ opposed this status draft, while the UPJ supported it. In November, this draft was discussed in the Bernese Grand Council (except for separatist deputies, who refused to participate in the debates), but as early as December, the date of June 23, 1974, was set for the first plebiscite. The Jura people therefore could not vote on the presented new Jura status draft.

On December 18, 1970, the Bernese Executive Council implemented the constitutional provisions defining the modalities of a self-determination procedure for the Jura, structured in three stages of "cascading voting", designated under the name of "Jura plebiscites":

Amendment on the new constitutional provisions relating to the Jura
- First plebiscite: Decision of the seven districts concerned on the creation of a new canton;
- Second plebiscite (on referendum):
  1. If, in all seven districts, the majority votes for a Jura canton (yes), the districts that gave a negative majority (no) may request, within six months, a new vote allowing them to decide whether they want to join the new canton or remain Bernese;
  2. If, in all seven districts, the majority votes against a Jura canton (no), the districts that voted yes may, within six months, request a new plebiscite; they will thus have the option to form an independent canton;
  3. Regarding the Laufen district, it has special rights. If a separation procedure is initiated and does not concern this district, it may request, within two years, the opening of an attachment procedure to a neighbouring canton;
- Third plebiscite (on referendum): If, following these two votes, a limited-territory Jura canton emerges, the municipalities bordering the new border may, within two months, self-determine for or against joining the new canton.

During the first plebiscite, on June 23, 1974, a majority emerged in favour of creating a new canton. The Rassemblement jurassien welcomed this victory. However, anti-separatist circles launched initiatives to organise a second plebiscite in the districts where "no" was majority (Moutier, Courtelary, La Neuveville, and Laufen). During this second plebiscite, on March 16 and September 14, 1975, these four districts voted in favour of remaining in the canton of Bern. The RJ then denounced a "fragmentation" of the Jura, which it attributed to anti-separatists, and filed appeals against this second plebiscite, which were rejected by the Federal Council. It was at this point that the RJ's objective evolved: it now turned towards the reunification of the Bernese Jura under the aegis of the canton of Jura.

On April 11, 1975, Georges Droz gathered 300 people in Tavannes to bring together all southern autonomist forces, baptised Unité jurassienne (UJ). A provisional committee was formed, chaired by Paul Hammel. The UJ was officially founded in Moutier on May 21, 1976, with Alain Charpilloz as first president. Its objective was to gather the remaining separatists in southern Jura following the two plebiscites of 1974 and 1975.

Following the results favourable to the creation of the Republic and Canton of Jura, a Jurassic Constituent Assembly was established to draft the new canton's constitution. One of Roland Béguelin's major fears was that future constituents would be influenced by the Federal Council and end up too deeply anchored in the traditional Swiss political system, to the point of forgetting the fundamental demands related to recovering the southern districts. To prevent this drift, he called on the Jura population, during the elections of constituent deputies, to elect active and committed members of the Rassemblement jurassien.

In the late 1980s, Roland Béguelin, general secretary of the RJ since 1953, remained a central figure in the Rassemblement jurassien and tirelessly pursued his goal of reunification between the Jura that remained Bernese and the Canton of Jura. His positions elicited divergent and less favorable opinions within the separatist movement itself. His ideas, unchanged since 1947, focused on relentless criticism of the Bernese Executive Council and the Federal Council, which he accused of remaining passive regarding the Jura question. He described Switzerland as "a residue of the Middle Ages, an artificial construction and a relic adrift". Roland Béguelin advocated for the Canton of Jura to define itself as a "state of combat and to set out to conquer the southern Jura districts that had chosen to remain Bernese". In contrast, the Jura Government, constrained by its constitution and the requirements of the Confederation, adopted a less radical approach. Keen not to exacerbate tensions, it chose dialogue and reconciliation to try to win over the anti-separatists of the Bernese Jura and the Bernese Executive Council, while pursuing the goal of reunification. For Roland Béguelin, this approach was perceived as an act of cowardice. He made no secret of his consternation or anger toward the Jura authorities. Relations between the RJ and the latter gradually deteriorated, leading to a definitive break.

In 1992, the Jura Government and the Rassemblement jurassien presented the UNIR initiative to the Parliament of the Canton of Jura. This initiative stipulated that "the institutional unity of the Jura constitutes one of the main objectives of the Canton of Jura; the law aims to provide the political, financial, cultural and legal means to achieve this goal". The Parliament accepted the UNIR initiative on September 23, 1992. In response, the Bernese Executive Council filed an appeal against this initiative. The Federal Supreme Court of Switzerland invalidated the UNIR initiative and recommended that the Jura Parliament not proceed with it. However, the latter nonetheless adopted the "UNIR law".

=== Jurassian autonomist movement (since 1994) ===
In 1993, under the impetus of Pierre-André Comte, the Unité jurassienne proposed its merger with the Rassemblement jurassien. However, this merger was refused by Roland Béguelin, who believed that the Unité jurassienne was already a branch of the Rassemblement jurassien and that its presence on Bernese soil was problematic in light of recent events. This decision caused tensions between him and Pierre-André Comte. On September 13, 1993, Roland Béguelin died, and the merger was finally carried out on March 20, 1994. The group thus formed took the name Mouvement autonomiste jurassien (MAJ).

On September 3, 1994, the MAJ reorganized its political line to better defend the interests of the Jura people. The MAJ renounced the goal of reunification, while reaffirming its desire to liberate the southern districts from the Canton of Bern.

On November 29, 1998, the MAJ organized a consultative vote in Moutier. The citizens narrowly rejected the attachment of their municipality to the Canton of Jura, with 1,891 votes in favor and 1,932 against.

On November 20, 1999, the MAJ carried out an official revision of its statutes.

On April 5, 2003, the Mouvement autonomiste jurassien launched the "Un seul Jura" initiative. It submitted this initiative to the Jura cantonal chancellery on September 12. The initiative proposed studying a new six-district Jura state through the Inter-Jura Assembly. The initiative was adopted by the Jura Parliament in 2004, against the opinion of the Jura Government. Following the refusal expressed in 2013 by the Bernese Jura to launch a study on the creation of a common canton with Jura, then in the context of the official transfer of the town of Moutier to the Republic and Canton of Jura on January 1, 2026, and finally with the constitutional closure of the Jura question set for December 31, 2025, the political and institutional situation has profoundly evolved since the founding of the MAJ. It is in this new framework that, on May 23, 2025, the MAJ announced a major strategic reorientation. Abandoning the goal of making the reunification of Jura and Bernese Jura its primary objective, the MAJ now prioritizes an approach based on inter-Jura dialogue. This new orientation aims to overcome traditional territorial divisions by highlighting the common elements that unite the Jura populations of the two cantons. The movement expresses its desire to contribute to a renewed phase of dialogue, focused on cooperation, mutual recognition, and the pursuit of the general interest. It affirms its commitment to a pacified and constructive understanding between the regions, excluding any approach driven by a spirit of revenge or nostalgia for past conflicts. These new statutes were officially adopted on June 28, 2025, by the MAJ delegates, meeting in Fontenais. In its new guideline, the MAJ affirms its desire to promote and protect the French-speaking identity of the Bernese Jura, particularly in the face of what it describes as the risk of "Bennization", that is, a progressive assimilation into the predominantly German-speaking culture of the Canton of Bern. At the same time, the movement maintains its demand for a new vote for the municipality of Belprahon, which it considers a special case that has not yet found a satisfactory outcome in the inter-Jura process.

== Affiliated organizations ==
- Association suisse des amis du Jura libre (ASJL), (1961–1987): association intended for all Swiss people supporting the Jura separatists in their autonomist aspirations;
- Groupe Bélier: The group was founded on June 22, 1962, on the initiative of Marcel Brêchet and Michel Gury. It is an organization intended to bring together young Jura separatists. This group has no longer been affiliated with the Rassemblement jurassien since 1981;
- Association des Jurassiens de l'extérieur (AJE), (since 1962): The association was founded on December 2, 1962, in Neuchâtel by the Rassemblement jurassien, with the aim of uniting the 22 external sections of the RJ outside the Jura in one association. Its political objective is to have a network of relations throughout Switzerland to make the Jura problem known;
- Association féminine pour la défense du Jura (AFDJ), (since 1963): Created on March 24, 1963, the exclusively female association brings together women who wish to work toward the creation of the Canton of Jura;
- Mouvement universitaire jurassien (MUJ), (since 1964): Founded on September 13, 1964, the movement brings together separatist Jura students from Romandie universities. Originally, the first activists of this group wished to react to the refusal of the Council of State of the Canton of Vaud to allow the Jura to participate in the Swiss National Exposition of 1964. Its goal is to "bring together students who propose, in particular through study and objective information, to seek a solution to the Jura problem, in the sense of political autonomy;
- Unité jurassienne (UJ), (1975–1994): Conceived on April 11, 1975, by Georges Droz in Tavannes, this movement brings together Jura separatists living in the districts that decided to remain Bernese during the second Jura plebiscite of 1975. The UJ was officially established in Moutier on May 21, 1976.

== Structure ==
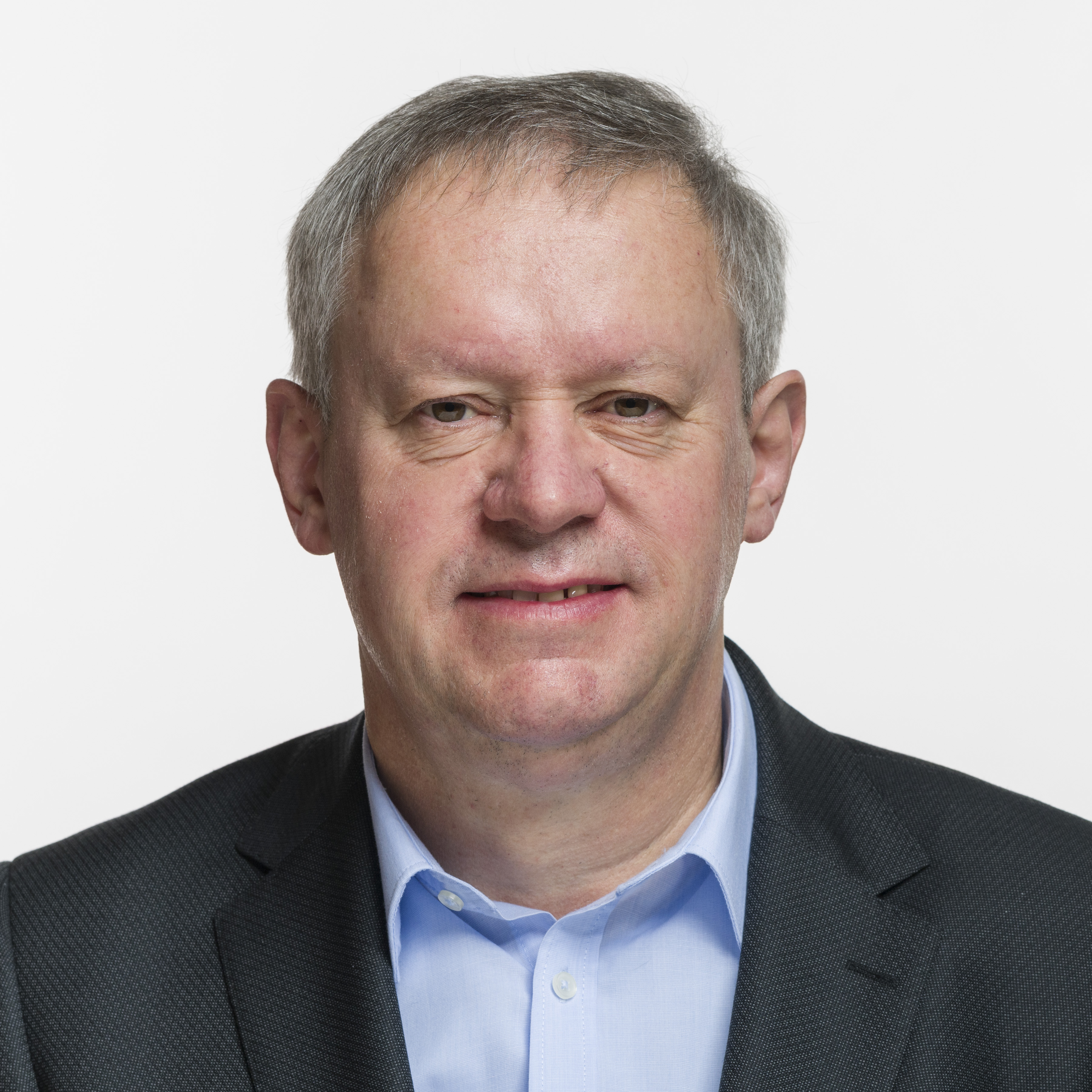
Pierre-Alain Fridez, president of the MAJ since 2025.

The governing body of the Mouvement autonomiste jurassien (MAJ) is the executive committee. The federations commission ensures coordination between the movement's various sections and the executive committee. The delegates' assembly constitutes the sovereign body: it defines the major political orientations of the MAJ and takes major strategic decisions.

Members of the governing body are elected for a three-year term. For the period 2025–2028, Pierre-Alain Fridez serves as president, seconded by Nadège Wegmüller as vice-president. Pierre-André Comte holds the position of general secretary, assisted by Jean-Marie Koller, deputy general secretary. The body also includes a financial controller, a representative of the Association féminine pour la défense du Jura, a representative of the Association des Jurassiens de l’extérieur, a representative of the Groupe Bélier, as well as eight other members.

At its founding, the movement's headquarters were located at Ruelle de l’Écluse 10 in Delémont. During the merger in 1994 and the name change, the headquarters were transferred to Place Roland-Béguelin in Moutier.

=== History of positions ===
==== MSJ, RJ and MAJ ====
Presidents of the Mouvement séparatiste jurassien
- 1947–1951: Daniel Charpilloz

Presidents of the Rassemblement jurassien

- 1951–1954: Daniel Charpilloz
- 1954–1965: André Francillon
- 1965–1980: Germain Donzé
- 1980–1991: Bernard Mertenat
- 1991–1994: Christian Vaquin

Presidents of the Mouvement autonomiste jurassien

- 1994–2012: Christian Vaquin
- 2012–2025: Laurent Coste
- Since 2025: Pierre-Alain Fridez
General secretaries of the Mouvement séparatiste jurassien
- 1947–1950: Roger Schaffter
- 1950–1951: Pierre Billieux

General secretaries of the Rassemblement jurassien

- 1951–1953: Pierre Billieux
- 1953–1991: Roland Béguelin
- 1991–1994: Pierre-André Comte

General secretary of the Mouvement autonomiste jurassien

- Since 1994: Pierre-André Comte

==== UJ ====
Presidents of the Unité jurassienne
- 1976–1978: Alain Charpilloz
- 1979–1980: Ivan Vecchi
- 1980–1982: Jean-Marie Mauron
- 1982–1987: Jean-Claude Crevoisier
- 1988–1994: Pierre-André Comte

== Events ==
The MAJ, together with its affiliated organizations, regularly organizes events related to the Jura question or in support of the Jura people.

- Fête du peuple jurassien ("Festival of the Jura People"): held every year since 1948, in September, in Delémont;
- Faites la liberté ("Make Freedom"): held every year since 2006, in June, in Moutier;
- Fête de la jeunesse ("Youth Festival"): organized by the Groupe Bélier, held every year since 1965, in March in Moutier;
- Commemoration of June 23, 1974: the various local sections organize, in the municipalities, a commemoration of the Jura plebiscite.
- Tributes to Roland Béguelin and Roger Schaffter: the MAJ very often pays tribute to them during commemorations of their birth and death dates.

== Press ==
The newspaper Le Jura libre is the press organ of the Mouvement autonomiste jurassien. Founded in 1948 by Roger Schaffter, Roland Béguelin and Roger Chatelain, it appears once a month.

The board of directors of Jura Libre is chaired by Alain Charpilloz (nephew of Daniel Charpilloz), while Laurent Girardin serves as editor-in-chief. The newspaper is printed at the Le Pays printing center in Delémont.

== Notable people ==
Non-exhaustive list of known members:

- Daniel Charpilloz (1872–1955), industrialist and co-founder of the second Mouvement séparatiste jurassien;
- Alexandre Voisard (1930–2024), poet;
- Jean Cuttat (1916–1992), writer;
- Roger Schaffter (1917–1998), teacher, co-founder member and first general secretary of the second Mouvement séparatiste jurassien, deputy to the Constituent Assembly of the Canton of Jura and first Jura Council of States (Switzerland)|Councillor of States;
- Roland Béguelin (1921–1993), journalist, writer, co-founder member and third general secretary of the second Mouvement séparatiste jurassien, member of the Constituent Assembly of the Canton of Jura and first President of the Parliament of the Canton of Jura;
- Valentine Friedli (1929–2016), technical architect, co-founder member of the Association féminine pour la défense du Jura, deputy to the Constituent Assembly of the Canton of Jura and Jura National Councillor;
- Pierre-André Comte (born 1955), teacher, deputy to the Parliament of the Canton of Jura, fifth President of the Unité jurassienne (1987–1994), fourth general secretary of the Rassemblement jurassien and current general secretary of the Mouvement autonomiste jurassien;
- Jean-Claude Crevoisier (born 1938), politician, fourth President of the Unité jurassienne (1982–1987) and Bernese National Councillor;
- François Lachat (born 1942), writer, President of the Constituent Assembly of the Canton of Jura, Government of the Canton of Jura|minister and first President of the Jura Government and Jura National Councillor;
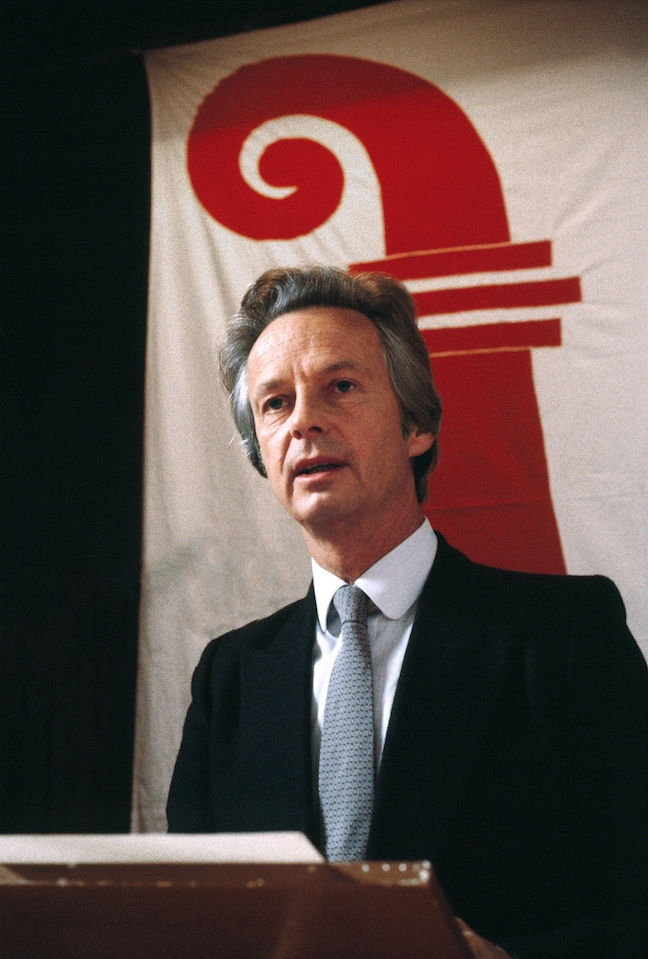
Roland Béguelin, general secretary of the RJ from 1953 to 1991.

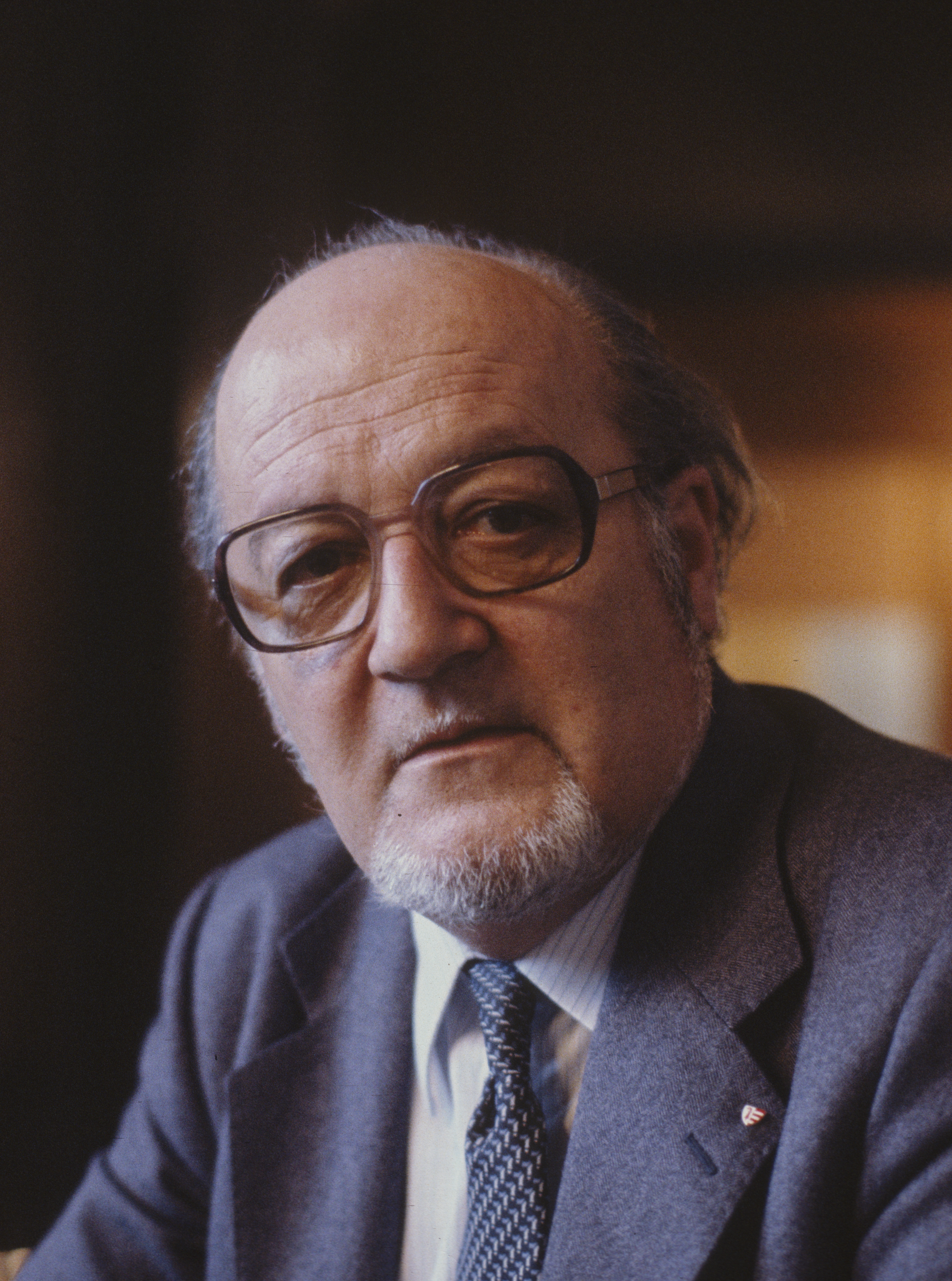
Roger Schaffter, general secretary of the MSJ from 1947 to 1950.

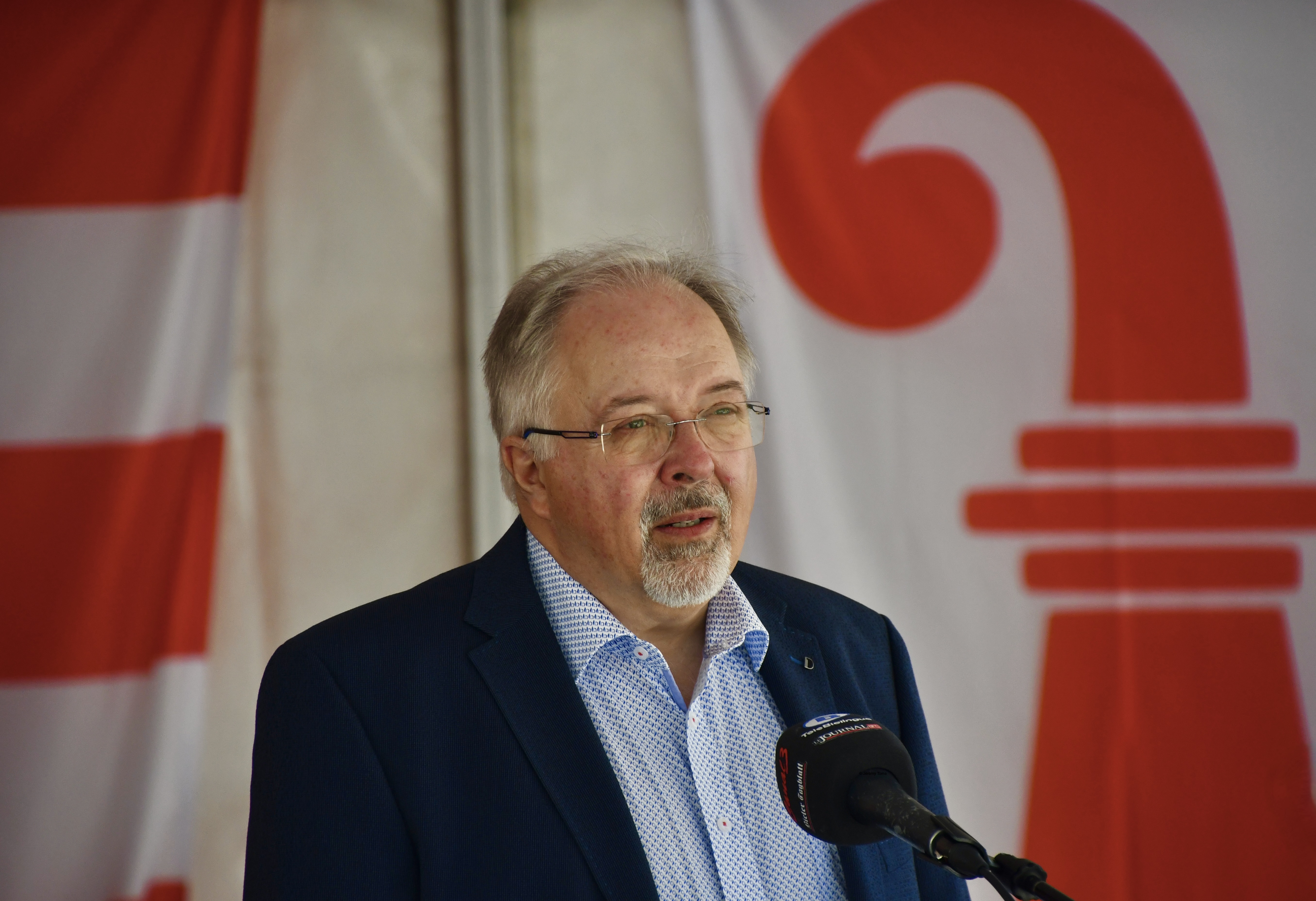
Laurent Coste, President of the MAJ from 2012 to 2025.

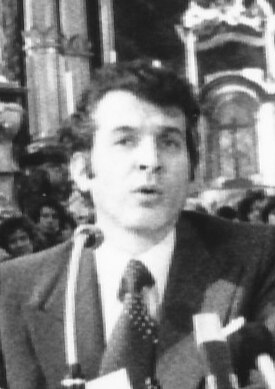
François Lachat, member of the MAJ.

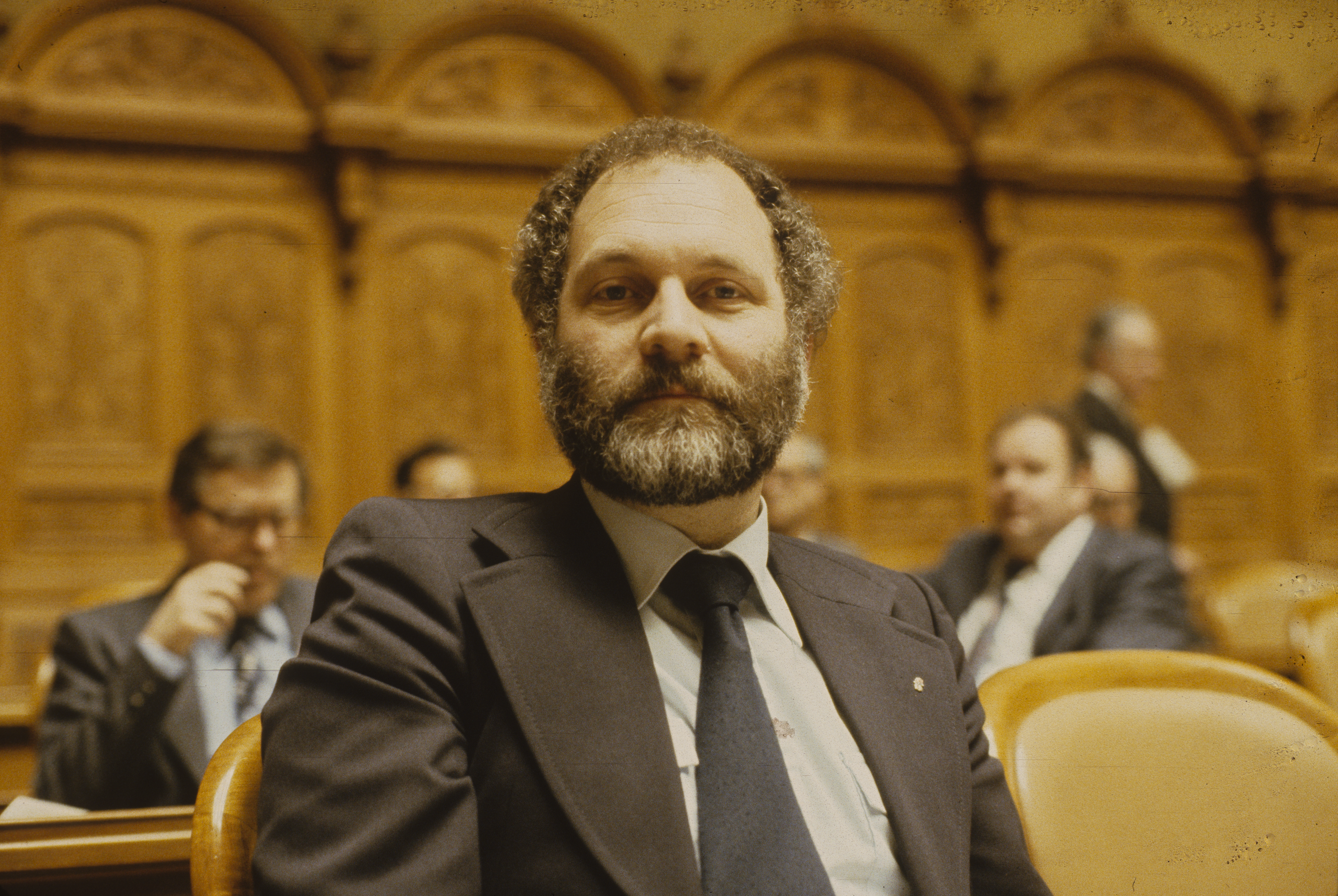
Jean-Claude Crevoisier, President of the UJ from 1982 to 1987.

== Associated external movements ==
From the mid-1960s, Roland Béguelin relied on other struggles of French-speaking communities around the world to give weight to his cause. It was with this in mind that he created the Conférence des minorités ethniques de langue française in 1971, of which the RJ is one of the permanent members. From then on, the RJ, and later the MAJ, showed great support and maintained strong links with the so-called "brother peoples" movements. These are mainly organizations representing minority French-speakers in their respective states, such as the Quebecers, the Walloons, the Valdôtains, the Acadians or the Louisianans. More recently, the MAJ also supports the Corsicans and the Catalans.

At every Fête du peuple jurassien, the flags of these regions and communities are present alongside the Jura flag.

=== Quebec ===
As early as 1967, Roland Béguelin gave strong support to Quebec sovereignty, maintaining several correspondences with key figures in Quebec sovereignty from that date.He was then invited, between 1979 and 1981, to the 7th and 8th congresses of the Parti Québécois held in Sainte-Foy and Montreal.

- Rassemblement pour l'indépendance nationale
- Parti Québécois;
- Mouvement national des Québécoises et Québécois.

Béguelin became a great friend of René Lévesque, who made an official visit to Delémont on July 1 and 2, 1983, leading to the signing of a cooperation agreement between the Republic and Canton of Jura and the Province of Quebec,.

=== Wallonia ===
Since the late 1960s, the MAJ has also supported Walloon independence (where Roland Béguelin was also invited by the Rassemblement Wallon in 1981).

- Rassemblement Wallon;
- Rassemblement pour l’unité des Francophones (formerly Association Bruxelles-Français);
- Action fouronnaise.

On December 21, 1988, the Republic and Canton of Jura and the Wallonia-Brussels Federation signed a joint cooperation agreement concerning exchange and partnership projects in the fields of culture and education.

=== Aosta Valley ===
The French-speaking community of the Aosta Valley in Italy also has an autonomist movement supported by the MAJ.

- Valdostan Union.

Since 1995, the Jura Parliament and the Regional Council of Aosta Valley have been linked by an agreement. The two legislatures invited their respective governments to conclude a cooperation agreement. The agreement between Jura and the Aosta Valley was signed on March 19, 2004, by the two government presidents.

=== Other movements ===
- Mouvement romand (defense of the rights and interests of the Romands);
- Société nationale de l'Acadie (defense of the rights and interests of the Acadian people);
- Parti acadien (autonomy of Acadia within Canada);
- Association française de solidarité avec les peuples de langue française (defense of the French language);
- Corsica Libera (independence of Corsica)
- Corsican National Liberation Front (independence of Corsica);
- Democratic European Party of Catalonia (independence of Catalonia);
- Appel national pour la République (independence of Catalonia)
- Together for Catalonia (independence of Catalonia).

== See also ==
=== Related articles ===
- Jura separatism
- Jura plebiscite

=== External links ===
- Official website
- Message from the Rassemblement Jurassien for the plebiscite of June 23, 1974
