= Roland Béguelin =

Swiss Jura separatist leader

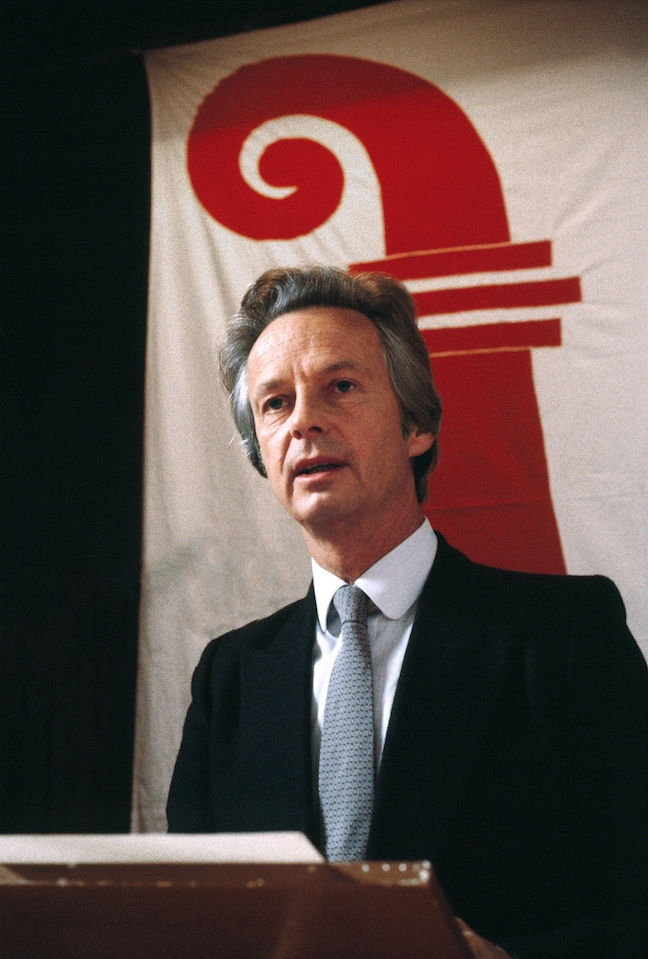
- Roland Béguelin in 1980

1st President of Parliament of Jura
- In office 1 January 1979 – 31 December 1979
- Deputy: André Cattin; Auguste Hauffmeyer
- Preceded by: Office established
- Succeeded by: André Cattin

Secretary General of Conference of French-speaking Communities
- In office 17 April 1971 – 10 August 1991
- President: Jean Pirotte; Alain Généreux; Gilles Rhéaume; Monique Vézina
- Preceded by: Office established
- Succeeded by: Pierre-André Comte

Secretary General of Rassemblement jurassien
- In office 19 April 1953 – 8 June 1991
- President: Daniel Charpilloz; André Francillon; Germain Donzé; Bernard Mertenat; Christian Vaquin
- Preceded by: Pierre Billieux
- Succeeded by: Pierre-André Comte

Member of Parliament of Jura
- In office 1 January 1979 – 31 December 1990
- Constituency: Delémont District

First Vice President of Jura Constituent Assembly
- In office 13 April 1976 – 6 December 1978

Member of Jura Constituent Assembly
- In office 12 April 1976 – 6 December 1978

Personal details
- Party: Social Democratic Party of Switzerland

Roland Béguelin (12 November 1921 – 13 September 1993) was a Swiss politician, journalist, and writer who served as the leader of the Jurassic separatist movement. He was a key figure in the establishment of the Canton of Jura as an independent canton of Switzerland.

== Early life and education ==
Béguelin was born on 12 November 1921 in Tramelan to Léon Béguelin, a watchmaker, and Denise Jobin. He was Protestant and held citizenship of Tramelan and Delémont. He obtained a degree in economics (licence ès sciences économiques) from the University of Neuchâtel.

== Career and political activism ==
In 1945, Béguelin was appointed communal secretary of Tramelan-Dessus. Two years later, in 1947, he was among the founders of the Mouvement séparatiste jurassien (Jurassic Separatist Movement), which became the Rassemblement jurassien (RJ) in 1951. Beginning in 1950, he served as editor-in-chief of Le Jura Libre, the movement's newspaper. In 1952, he was appointed secretary general of the RJ and became administrator of Imprimerie Boéchat SA in Delémont, which allowed him to dedicate himself fully to the struggle for Jurassic independence. Through his conviction, determination, and political skill, Béguelin established himself as the undisputed leader of the separatist movement.

A socialist militant since 1945, Béguelin's separatist engagement troubled the leaders of the Socialist Party of Bernese Jura, who obtained his exclusion from the Bernese Socialist Party in 1962. However, this decision was not applied by the Delémont section.

== Role in Jura independence ==
Béguelin was elected to the Constitutional Assembly of Jura in 1976, where he played a leading role as first vice-president. Following the creation of the Canton of Jura, he served as a socialist deputy in the Jura parliament from 1979 to 1990 and was its first president. While remaining at the head of the RJ, he worked to maintain pressure on Jurassic authorities regarding the reunification of Jura, though he could not prevent the movement's decline due to internal conflicts.

== Other activities ==
A Francophile, Béguelin served as secretary general of the Conference of French-speaking Ethnic Communities from 1971. He was also active in cultural affairs, having edited the Revue transjurane (1947-1950) and founded, with Roger Schaffter, the Éditions de la Bibliothèque jurassienne. He presided over the Delémont section of the Société jurassienne d'Émulation.

== Literary works ==
Béguelin was an author of poems and short stories. His written works include:

- Le réveil du peuple jurassien 1947-1950 (1952, second edition 1972)
- Le Jura des Jurassiens (1963, with V. Erard and others)
- Berne à l'heure du choix (1964, with Roger Schaffter)
- Un faux-témoin: la Suisse (1973)
- L'autodisposition du peuple jurassien et ses conséquences (1974, with Roger Schaffter)
- Quarante ans plus tard (1987, with A. Steullet).

== Personal life ==
Béguelin was married twice, first to Marie-Louise Montandon and later to Denise Schmidt, who worked as a secretary. He died on 13 September 1993 in Delémont.
