= Romandy Movement =

French apolitical association in Switzerland

- Mouvement Romand
- Flag of the Movement (1981-1992) designed by Roland Béguelin.
- Named after: Romandy region
- Formation: 1959
- Purpose: Independence of the Romandy region (Formerly)
- Region served: Romandy
- Official language: French
- Formerly called: Romandy Association for Francophone Solidarity; Romandy Popular Movement

The Romandy Movement (French: Mouvement Romand) or MR, was a Swiss apolitical association advocating for the defense of French language and culture in Switzerland, and independence of the Romandy region. The MR considered six French-speaking parts of the cantons of Fribourg, Geneva, Jura, Neuchâtel, Valais, and Vaud to be a part of Romandy.

== History ==
The Romandy Association for Francophone Solidarity (French: Association Romande de Solidarité Francophone) (ARSF) was founded in 1959 by Roland Béguelin, campaigning for “the defense and interests of the French-speaking cantons of Switzerland”. In 1985, the Association was briefly renamed the Romandy Popular Movement (French: Mouvement Populaire Romand) before officially taking the name Mouvement Romand (MR).

In 1992, after the rejection of the referendum on Switzerland's membership in the European Economic Area, the MR strengthened its positions. Since then, the MR has defended the coordination of school programs between the French-speaking cantons, the creation of a French-speaking economic council, as well as the rapprochement between universities and consultation between cantonal executives.

In 1997, the MR submitted a petition to the Grand Council of Geneva, asking the Grand Councils of the French-speaking cantons to create a Parliament and a Council of French-speaking Ministers, elected by universal suffrage, by the year 2000. The petition was rejected by the municipal, regional and international affairs committee.

In the 2000s, the MR redefined its objective and positioned itself against “Anglicisms and Americanisms appearing on the national and international levels”.

At the beginning of the 2010s, the MR abandoned its project for independence.
