= Fabrice Macquat =

Swiss politician

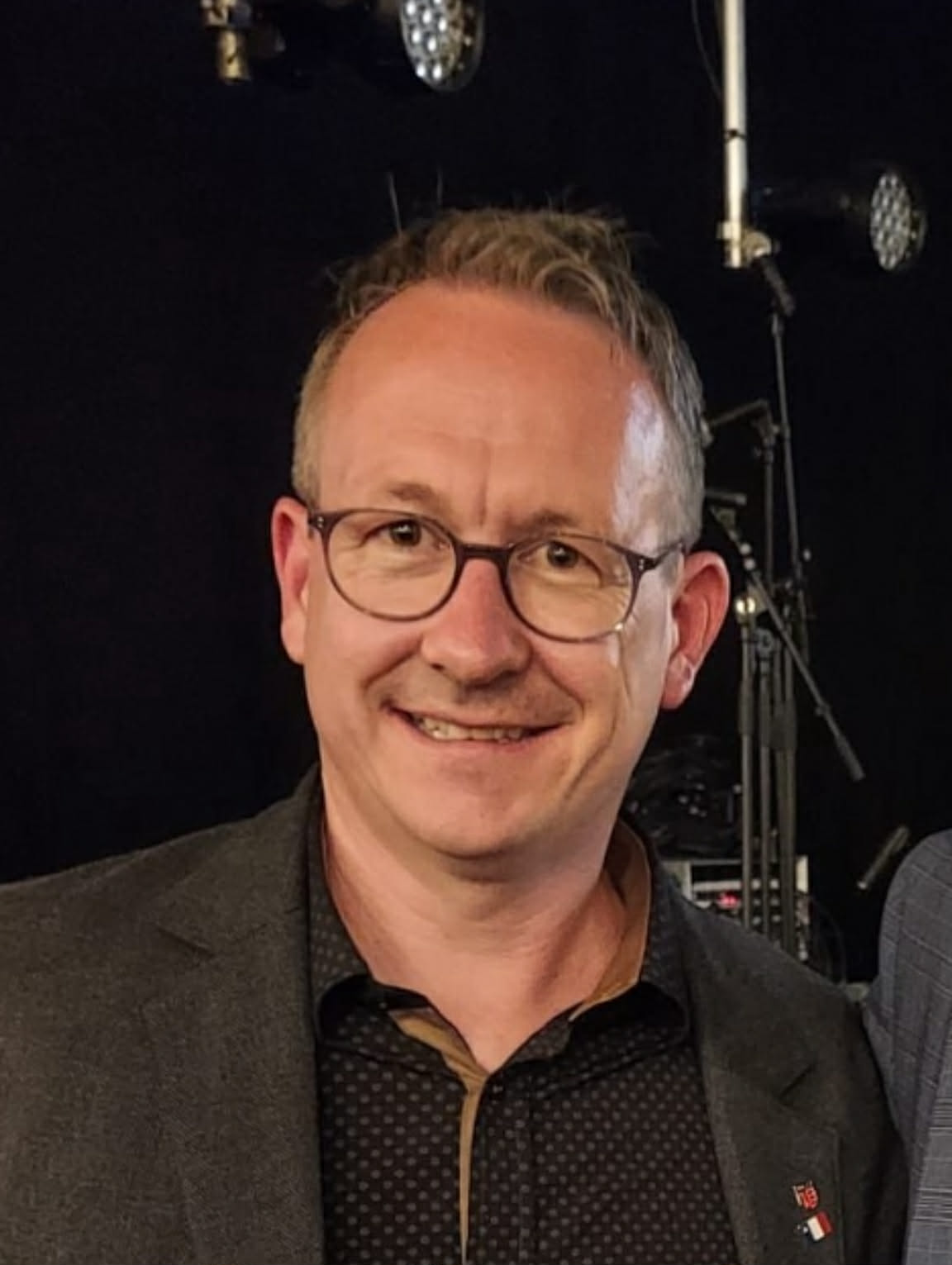
- President Fabrice Macquat in 2024

48th President of Parliament of Jura
- Incumbent
- Assumed office 1 January 2026
- Deputy: Patrick Chapuis; Magali Voillat
- Preceded by: Yann Rufer

First Vice President of Parliament of Jura
- In office 1 January 2025 – 31 December 2025
- President: Yann Rufer
- Preceded by: Yann Rufer
- Succeeded by: Patrick Chapuis

Second Vice President of Parliament of Jura
- In office 1 January 2024 – 31 December 2024
- President: Pauline Godat
- Preceded by: Yann Rufer
- Succeeded by: Patrick Chappuis

Member of Parliament of Jura
- Incumbent
- Assumed office 16 December 2020
- Constituency: Delémont District

Leader of the socialist group in Parliament of Jura
- In office 11 December 2020 – 31 December 2023

Substitute member of the Parliament of Jura
- In office 11 September 2013 – 15 December 2020
- Constituency: Delémont District

Personal details
- Born: Courroux, Switzerland
- Party: Social Democratic Party of Switzerland

Fabrice Macquat (born 10 June 1977) is a Swiss politician who serves as president of Parliament of Jura since 2026.

== Biography ==
Macquat is a member of the Social Democratic Party of Switzerland. He served as a substitute member of Parliament from 2013 to 2020 before being elected as a member of Parliament with 23% of the votes in the constituency of Delémont District. He was re-elected with 28% in 2025.

In 2024, he was elected second vice president of Parliament of Jura by the Assembly with 51 out of 60 votes. In 2025, he was elected first vice president with 49 votes.

In 2026, he was elected president of Parliament of Jura with 51 votes.
