= Rosalie Beuret Siess =

President of Government of Republic and Canton of Jura

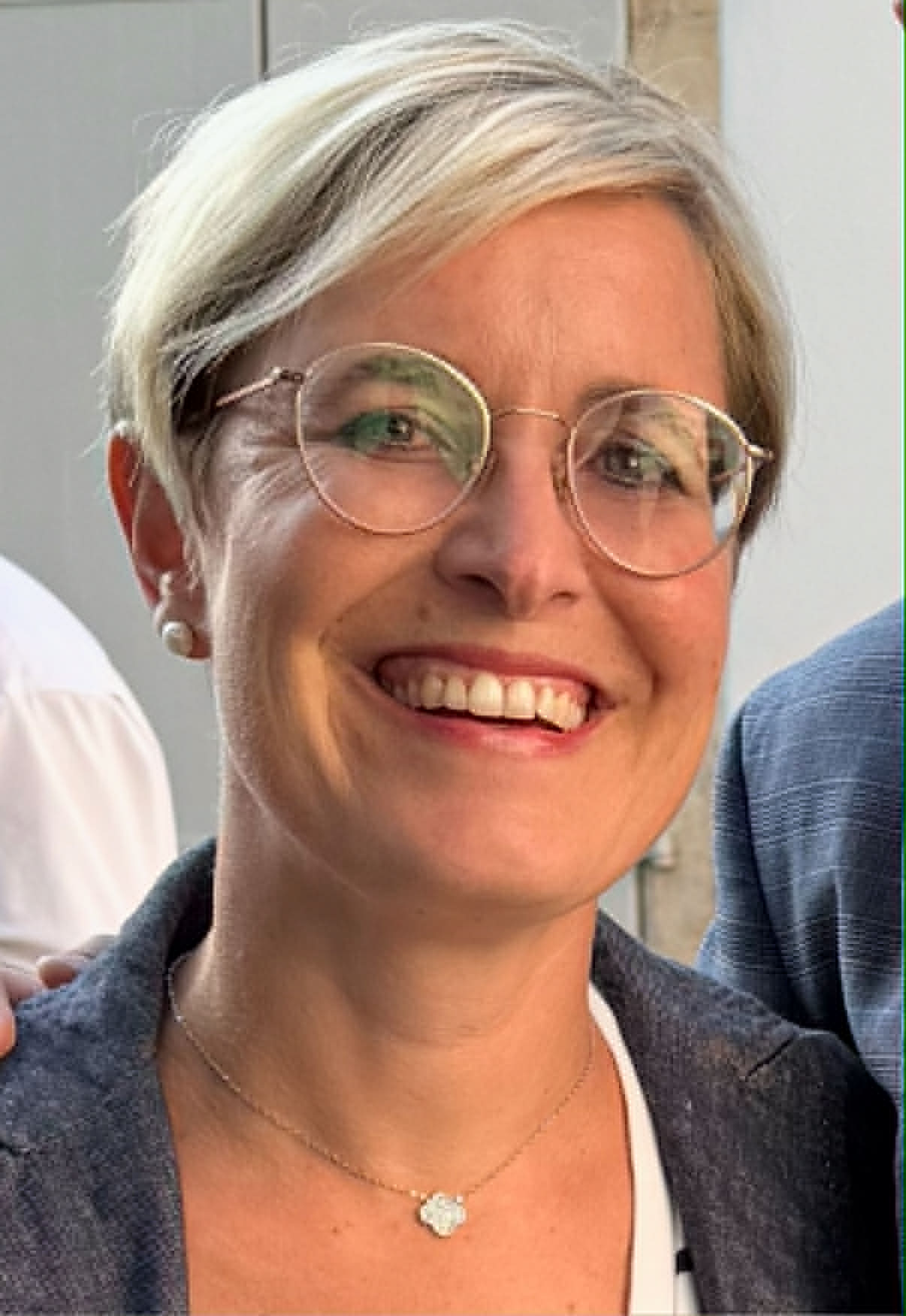
- President Rosalie Beuret Siess in 2025

46th and 48th president of Government of Republic and Canton of Jura
- Incumbent
- Assumed office 1 January 2026
- Preceded by: Martial Courtet
- In office 1 January 2024 – 31 December 2024
- Preceded by: Jacques Gerber
- Succeeded by: Martial Courtet

45th vice president of Government of Republic and Canton of Jura
- In office 1 January 2023 – 31 December 2023
- Preceded by: Jacques Gerber
- Succeeded by: Martial Courtet

4th minister of finance of Republic and Canton of Jura
- Incumbent
- Assumed office 25 March 2020
- Preceded by: Charles Juillard

Member of Parliament of Jura
- In office 16 December 2015 – 24 March 2020
- Constituency: Porrentruy District

City councilor of Porrentruy
- In office 2005–2017

President of City council of Porrentruy
- In office 1 January 2009 – 31 December 2009

Personal details
- Born: 24 August 1978 (age 47) Porrentruy, Switzerland
- Party: Social Democratic Party of Switzerland
- Children: 2

Rosalie Beuret Siess (born 24 August 1978) is a Swiss politician who is President of the Government of the Republic and Canton of Jura, and the canton's minister of finances.
