= Roger Schaffter =

Swiss politician and journalist

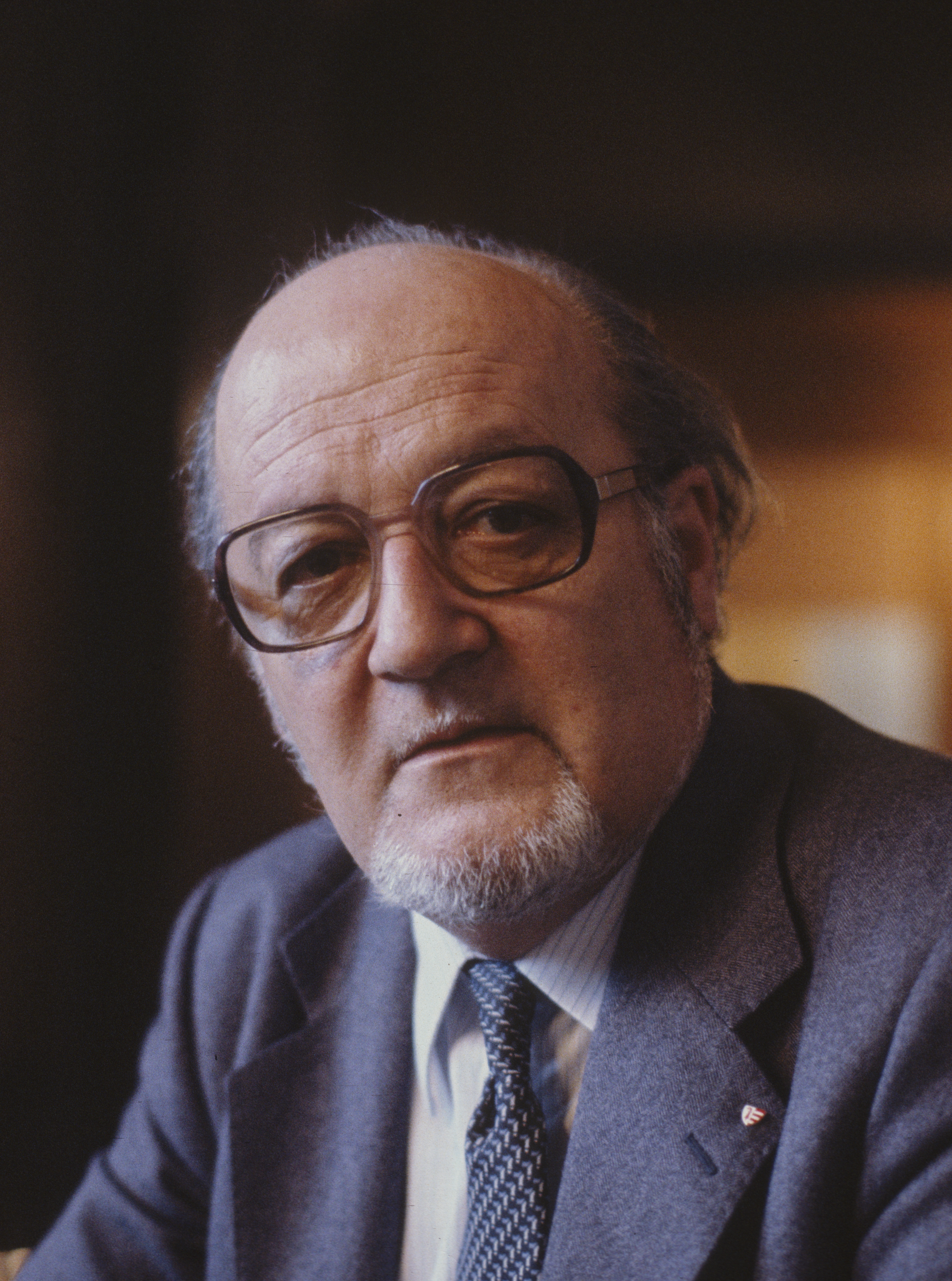
- Schaffter in 1979

Member of the Council of States
- In office 1979–1987
- Constituency: Canton of Jura

Personal details
- Born: 11 December 1917 Basel, Switzerland
- Died: 13 February 1998 (aged 80) Delémont, Canton of Jura, Switzerland
- Party: Christian Democratic Party
- Spouse: Suzanne Amuat (m. 1949)
- Education: University of Bern; University of Fribourg; University of Neuchâtel
- Occupation: Teacher, journalist

Roger Schaffter (11 December 1917 – 13 February 1998) was a Swiss politician, journalist, and teacher who played a central role in the creation of the Canton of Jura. He served as a member of the Swiss Council of States from 1979 to 1987 and was a founding member of the Jurassian separatist movement.

== Early life and education ==
Schaffter was born on 11 December 1917 in Basel to Joseph Schaffter, a customs official, and Valentine Beuchat. He was from Courtételle and was Catholic. He attended the Collège Saint-Charles in Porrentruy before pursuing higher education at the University of Bern, where he obtained a secondary teaching diploma in 1940. He continued his studies at the University of Fribourg, where he was a student of Gonzague de Reynold, and at the University of Neuchâtel, where he earned a licence ès lettres in 1960. In 1949, he married Suzanne Amuat, daughter of Albert, a chemist.

== Career ==
=== Teaching ===
Schaffter worked as a teacher in Porrentruy and served as director of the Swiss school in Genoa from 1950 to 1954. He later taught at the secondary level in Neuchâtel from 1957 to 1979.

=== Journalism ===
In addition to his teaching career, Schaffter was active in journalism. He served as editor-in-chief of the newspaper Le Jura libre from 1948 to 1950, and subsequently as assistant editor, writing chronicles under the pseudonym Pertinax. He was also editor-in-chief of Curieux from 1954 to 1956.

== Political career ==
=== Jurassian separatist movement ===
Schaffter is considered one of the fathers of the Canton of Jura. In 1947, he was a founding member of the Mouvement séparatiste jurassien (Jurassian Separatist Movement), which became the Rassemblement Jurassien in 1951. He served as the movement's first secretary general and later as vice-president until 1979. However, he broke with Roland Béguelin, disapproving of Béguelin's policies aimed at the reunification of Jura.

=== Constituent Assembly and cantonal roles ===
Following the creation of the Canton of Jura, Schaffter was elected as a Christian Democratic deputy to the Jurassian Constituent Assembly and presided over the inaugural session on 12 April 1976. From 1979 to 1982, he served as the delegate for cooperation of the new canton.

=== Council of States ===
Schaffter was elected to the Swiss Council of States in 1979, representing the Canton of Jura until 1987. During his tenure, he served as president of the Commission on Science and Research.

== Publishing and literary work ==
Schaffter was a co-founder of the Editions des Portes de France in Porrentruy in 1942 and the Editions de la Bibliothèque jurassienne. He authored literary works and writings on the Jura question.

== Death ==
Schaffter died on 13 February 1998 in Delémont.
