= Jura separatism =

Swiss movement for Bernese Jura to join the Canton of Jura

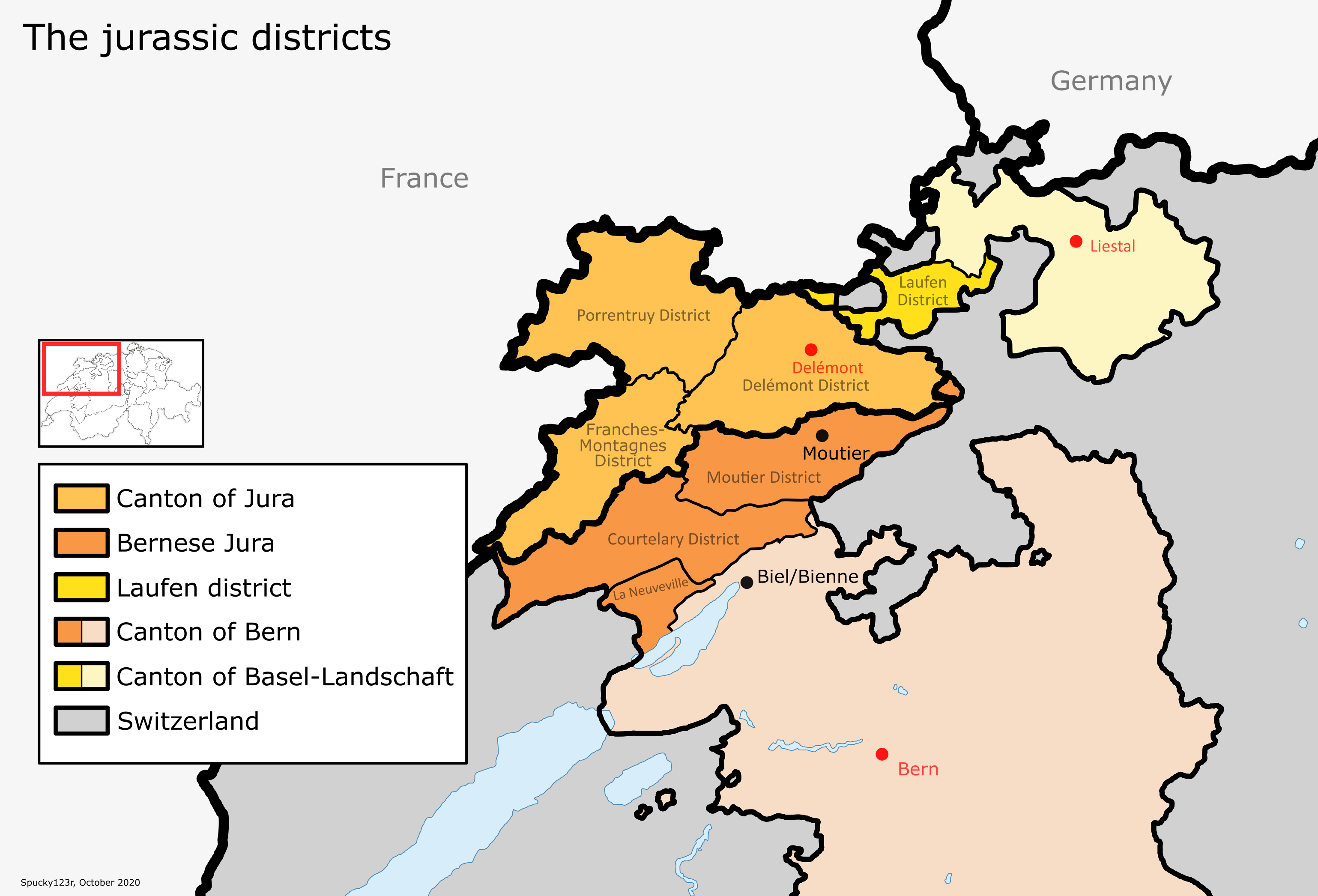
The seven Jura districts in Switzerland

The coat of arms of the canton of Jura is an irredentist design dating to 1943; it shows per pale the crozier of the historical coat of arms of the bishops of Basel, and seven stripes for the seven districts of the Jura region, including the four districts that still remained part of the Bernese Jura. One of the four has since voted instead to join Basel-Landschaft Canton.

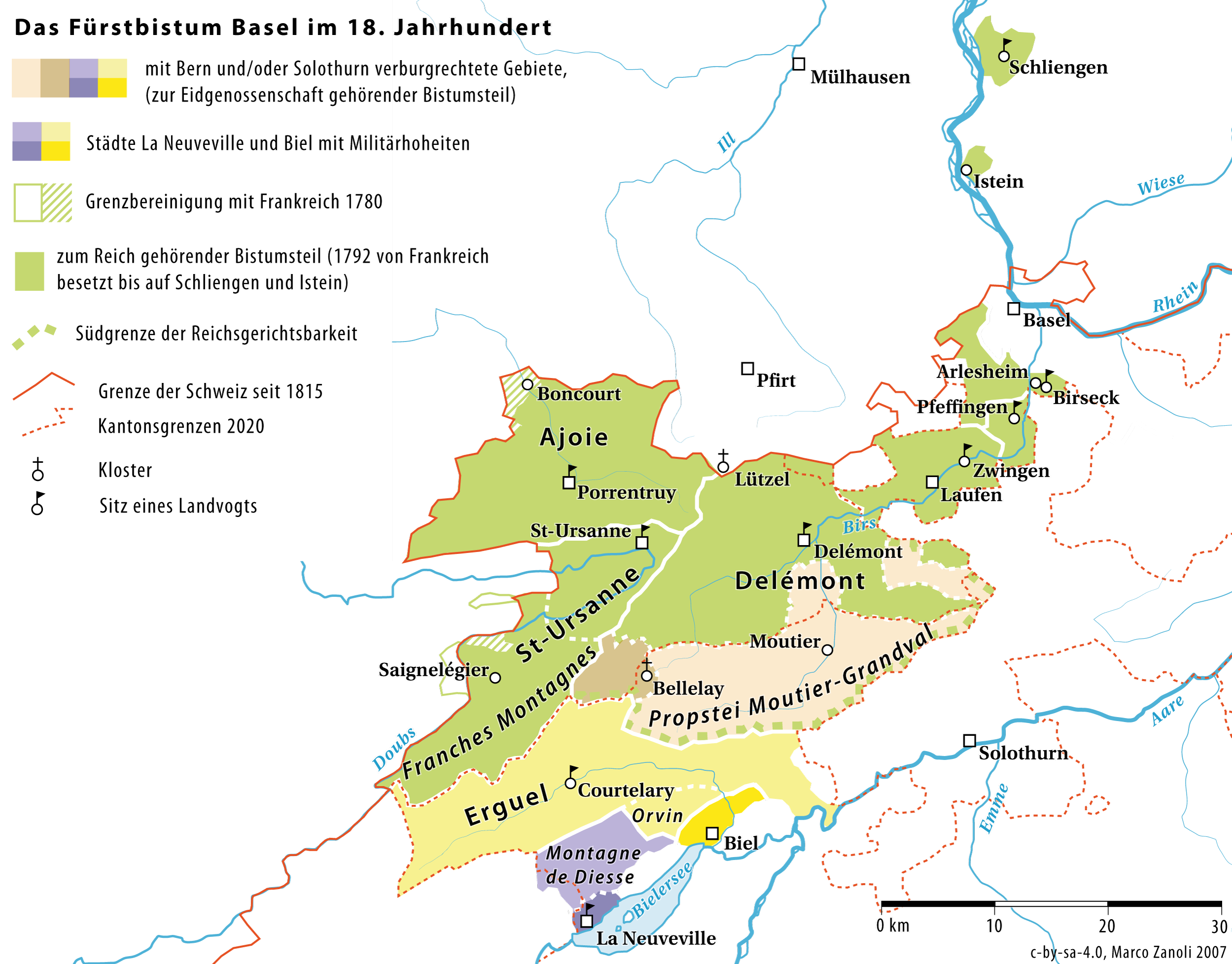
The Prince-Bishopric of Basel in the 18th century

Jura separatism (French: séparatisme jurassien) is a regionalist autonomist movement in the Bernese Jura of Switzerland.

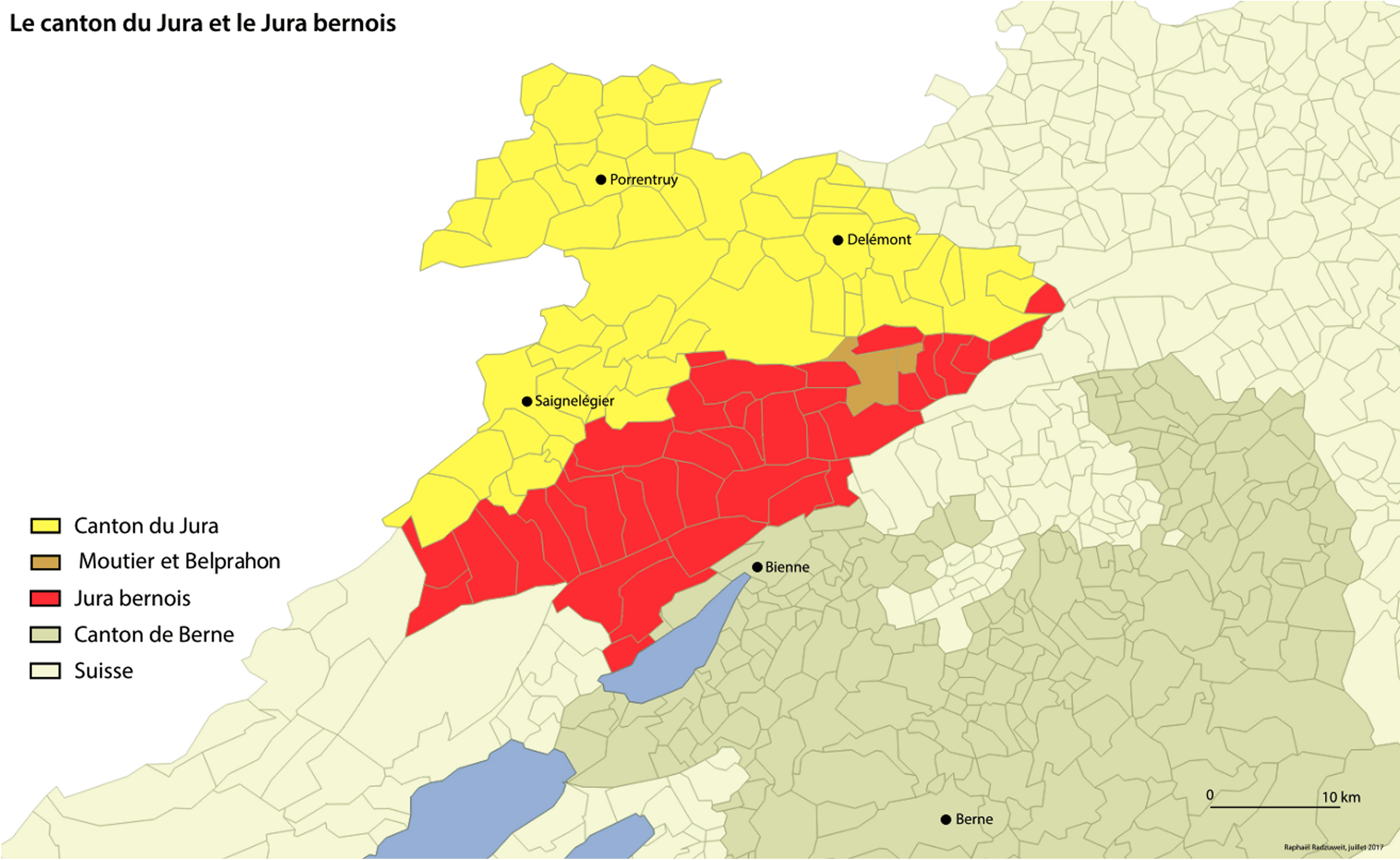
The focus on Moutier during the 2010-2021 period

The "Jura question" (French: question jurassienne; German: Jurafrage) is the question of secession of the Jura region from Bern, implemented partially as three of seven districts formed the Canton of Jura in 1979, while the remaining four opted to remain with Bern.

== History ==
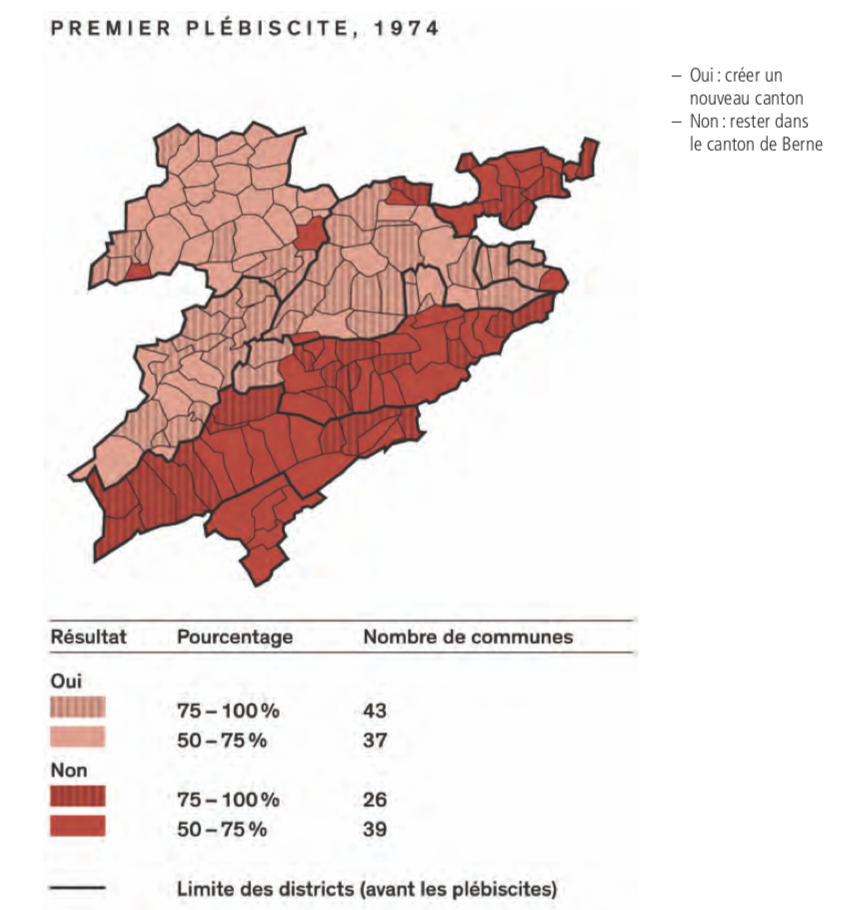
First vote map, 23 June 1974

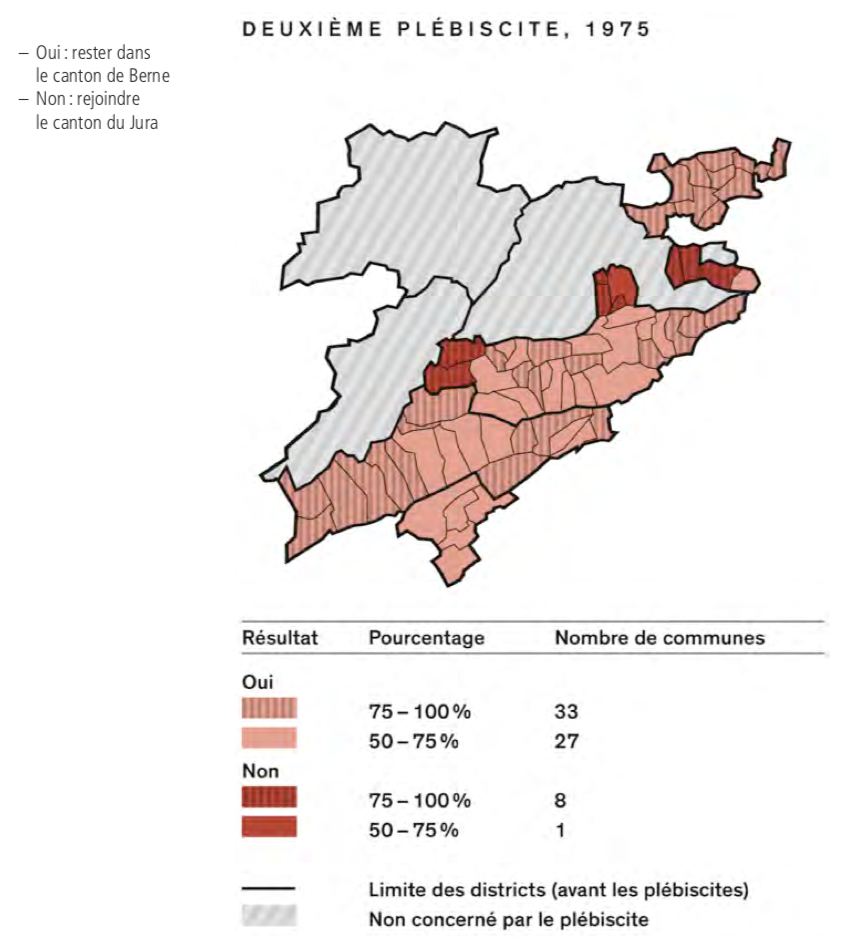
Second vote map, 16 March 1975

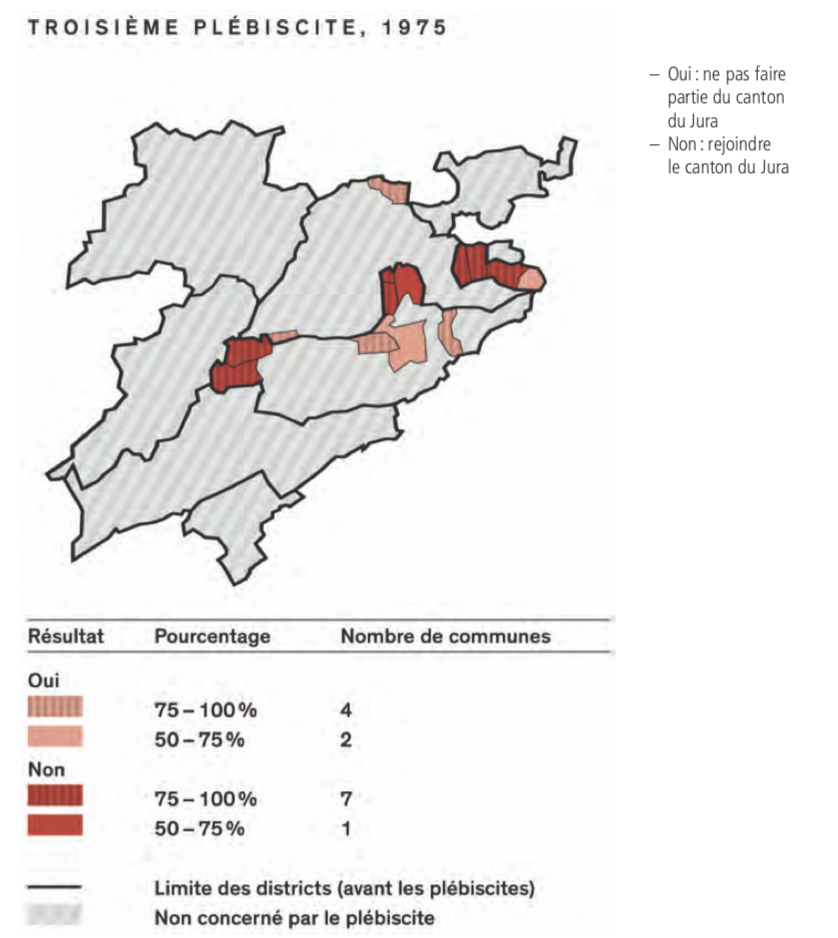
Third vote map, Fall 1975

Historically, the conflict originates with the Congress of Vienna (1815), where the Jurassic territories of the Prince-Bishopric of Basel were given to Bern. The "Jurassic question" was a topic in Swiss politics between 1947 and 1974. In 1947, a separatist Comité de Moutier was formed. By 1949, the separatist movement was officially constituted as the Rassemblement jurassien. In 1952, the opposing anti-separatist side was constituted as the Union des patriotes jurassiens (UPJ). A group of militant young separatists known as the Béliers ("rams") was formed in 1963, which by 1973 received its anti-separatist counterpart in the group Sangliers ("wild boars"). The cantonal government of Bern formed an official commission charged with the resolution of the conflict in 1967.

On 23 June 1974, a cantonal poll was held resulting in the decision to form a new canton of Jura. The three districts of Delémont, Porrentruy and Franches-Montagnes opted to secede with an important majority. The Yes won in total over the 7 districts but the No was ahead in Courtelary, La Neuveville, Moutier (the South Districts) and Laufen.

In a second poll of 16 March 1975, the four districts of Courtelary, La Neuveville, Moutier and Laufen voted in favour of remaining with Bern.

In Autumn 1975, a third vote was conducted in the 14 municipalities which the new border would traverse: each could choose to join the new Canton of Jura or remain with the canton of Bern. Six chose to remain with Bern, while seven opted to join the new Canton of Jura.

In 1977, the population of what was going to be the new canton ratified the cantonal constitution. Finally, the population of Switzerland in a national referendum accepted the accession of the new canton to the Swiss Confederacy with an 82.3% majority, and the new canton was officially created on 1 January 1979. Laufen was now a Bernese exclave, wedged between the new canton, Solothurn and Basel-Landschaft.

In 1984, the Black Boxes scandal was revealed: the canton of Bern had illegally distributed over 430,000 CHF between 1974 and 1982 to Loyalist groups to influence votes and referendums.

In a 1983 vote, the population of Laufen declined to join Basel-Landschaft. After the scandal of the Black Boxes, the Federal Supreme Court of Switzerland ordered a new vote that took place on 12 November 1989. After a transitional period, the move was approved by Swiss voters on 26 September 1993 by a majority of 75.2% and was effected in 1994.

With the creation of the canton of Jura, militant activism decreased, but there remained a politically active irredentist movement in the Bernese Jura.

The Béliers continued though to engage in acts of vandalism to express their outrage at what they claimed were irregularities in the plebiscites of 1974 and 1975, among other things stealing the Unspunnen Stone in 1984, and destroying the historic "Fountain of Justice" statue in Bern in 1986.

On 25 March 1994, the Inter-Jura Assembly was created by the Swiss Confederation to allow dialogue between the North and the South. The 25 March Agreement allowed eventually the municipality of Vellerat, that found itself in the canton of Bern, but it could only be reached via roads from the canton of Jura to organise to vote on its cantonal belonging. Vellerat proclaimed itself a "free municipality" and campaigned to join the new canton, which it eventually did in 1996 after the Swiss voters approved by 91.6% the transfer of Vellerat to the Canton of Jura on 10 March 1996.

In 1994, the Mouvement autonomiste jurassien (MAJ) was formed from a fusion of the Rassemblement jurassien (RJ) and the Unité jurassienne (UJ) groups. Another separatist group is Mouvement Indépendantiste Jurassien (MIJ), formed in 1990.

The three Bernese districts of Courtelary, La Neuveville and Moutier were united as the single district Jura bernois in 2001.

Due to the remaining separatist faction in Moutier, another poll was held in 1998, but the district again decided to remain Bernese. But in 2006, the autonomist parties gained a majority in the regional elections. In the same year, a Conseil du Jura bernois was formed, the only example of a regional parliament in Switzerland.

A new suggestion was published in 2007 by the Assemblée InterJurassienne (AIJ), to the effect that two "half-cantons" should be formed from the existing canton of Jura and the Bernese Jura.

In 2013, a new vote was organised to launch a process to create a new canton with the Canton of Jura and the Bernese Jura. The project is accepted in the Canton of Jura by 76.6% but is rejected in the South by 71.8% with the notable exception of Moutier (55% Yes), Belprahon and Sorvilier.

This led to the organisation of a new municipal vote in Moutier. The canton of Bern allowed the municipality to hold a new referendum organised on 18 June 2017. The majority favoured the transfer of the city of Moutier by 2,067 votes (51.72%) against 1,930 votes (48.28%). On 17 September 2017, Belprahon and Sorvilier finally rejected their transfers to the Canton of Jura.

With the end of these three votes, the Assemblée InterJurasienne was dissolved on 17 November 2017.

A year later, on 5 November 2018, the Yes Vote of Moutier was cancelled by the administrative Jura Bernese Prefecture pointing to unneutral propaganda by the authorities of Moutier before the vote and referred to problems with the electoral register.

On 23 March 2021, a new vote was organised in Moutier. With 2,114 votes (54.9%) in favour and 1,740 (45.1%) against the electors of the city of Moutier approved a second time the transfer of their city to the Canton of Jura.

== See also ==
- Rauracian Republic
- Alemannic separatism
- Modern history of Switzerland
- History of the canton of Bern
- Switzerland as a federal state

== Bibliography ==
- John Robert Graham Jenkins, Jura separatism in Switzerland, Clarendon Press, 1986, ISBN 978-0-19-823247-6.
- Michel Bassand, Le séparatisme jurassien, International Political Science Association, 1973.
- Adolf Gasser, Berne et le Jura (1815-1977), 1978.
- Claude Hauser, Aux origines intellectuelles de la question jurassienne : culture et politique entre la France et la Suisse romande (1910-1950), Editions Communication jurassienne et européenne (CEJ), 1997.
- Alain Pichard, La Question jurassienne : avant et après la création du 23e canton suisse, collection "Le savoir suisse", vol. 16, Presses polytechniques et universitaires romandes, 2004. ISBN 2-88074-575-6.
