= Parliament of Jura =

Legislature of the canton of Jura, Switzerland

Parliament of Jura Parlement jurassien
- 12nd Parliament

Type
- Type: Unicameral

Leadership
- President: Fabrice Macquat, SP/PS since 1 January 2026
- First Vice President: Patrick Chapuis, CSP since 1 January 2026
- Second Vice President: Magali Voillat, The Center since 1 January 2026

Structure
- Seats: 60
- Political groups: PDC 17; PS 16; UDC 11; PLR 6; PCSI 5; Greens 4; CS - POP 1

Meeting place
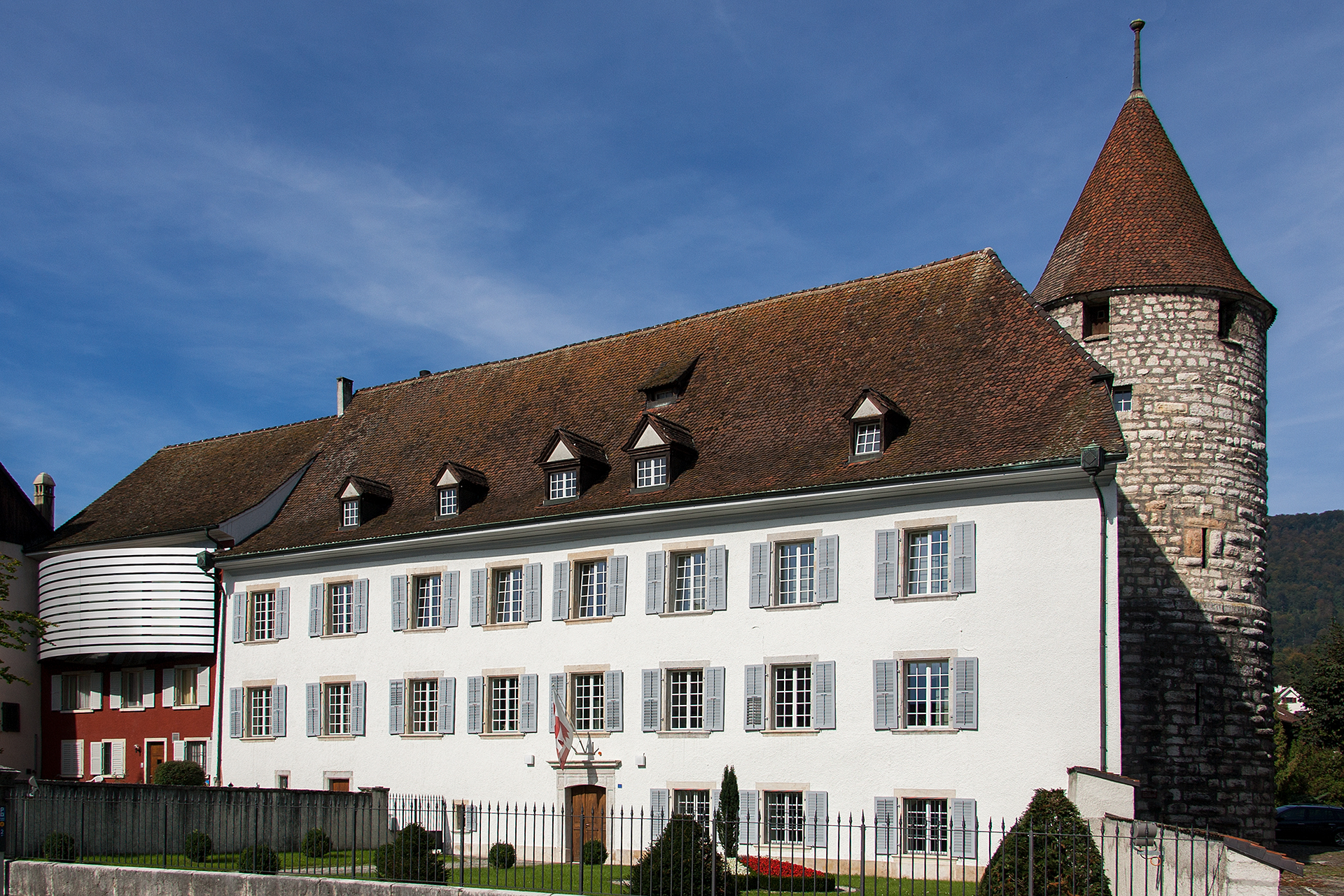
- Hôtel du Parlement, Delémont

Website
- www.jura.ch/fr/Autorites/PLT.html

The Parliament of Jura (French: Parlement du Jura) is the legislature of the canton of Jura, in Switzerland. Jura, styled a 'Republic and Canton', has a unicameral legislature. The Parliament has 60 seats, with members elected every five years.

The current President of the Parliament is the socialist Fabrice Macquat from Courroux
