= Belprahon =

- Municipality
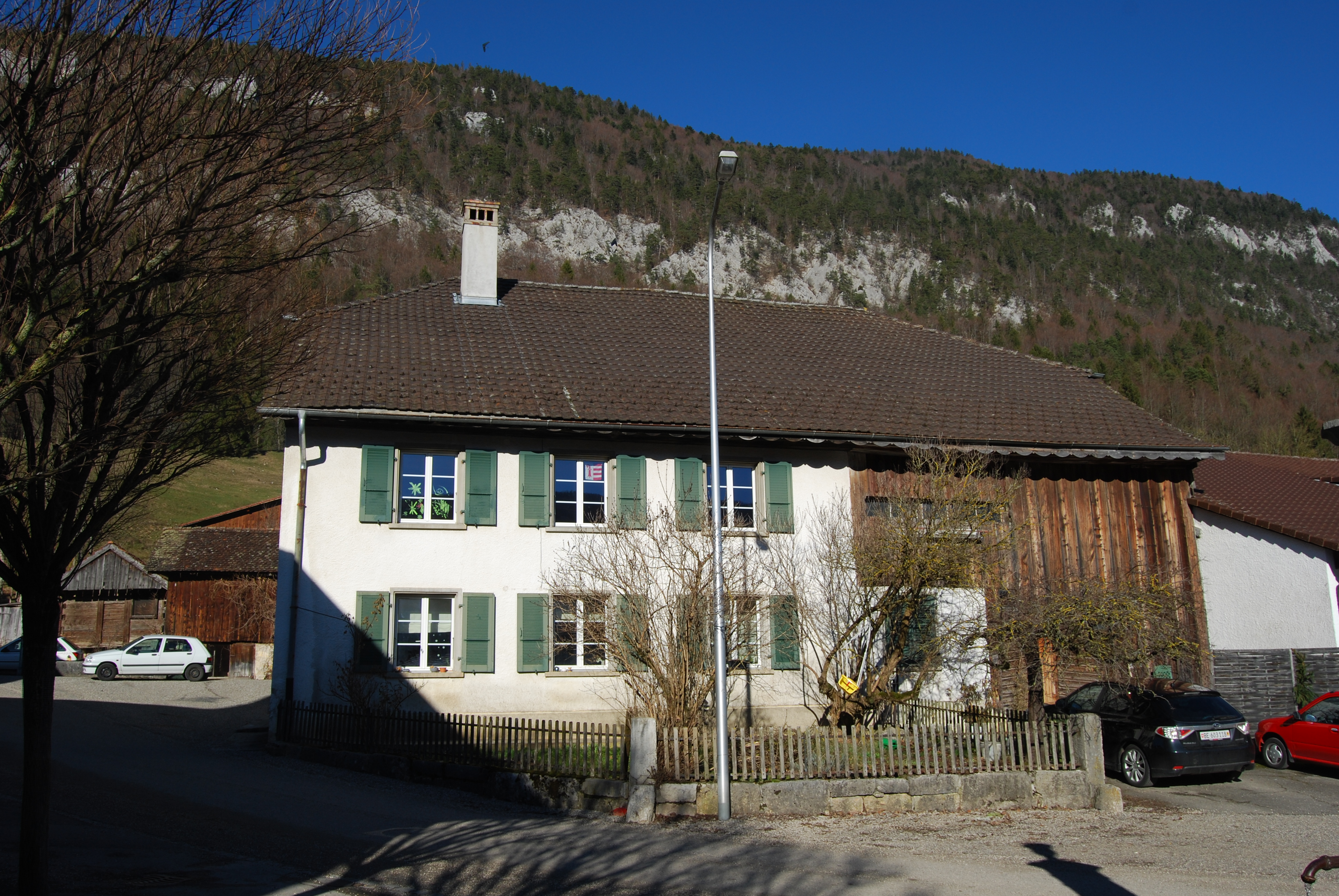
- A House in Belprahon village

- Flag Coat of arms
- Location of Belprahon
- Location within Switzerland Location within Canton of Bern
- Coordinates: 47°17.112′N 7°24.322′E
- Country: Switzerland
- Canton: Bern
- District: Jura bernois

Government
  - Mayor: Maire; Rais Evelyne

Area
  - Total: 3.79 km^{2} (1.46 sq mi)
- Elevation: 627 m (2,057 ft)

Population (Dec 2011)
  - Total: 303
  - Density: 79.9/km^{2} (207/sq mi)
- Time zone: UTC+01:00 (CET)
  - Summer (DST): UTC+02:00 (CEST)
- Postal code: 2744
- SFOS number: 681
- ISO 3166 code: CH-BE
- Surrounded by: Moutier, Roches, Grandval, Eschert
- Website: http://www.belprahon.ch SFSO statistics

Belprahon (French pronunciation: [bɛl.pʁa.ɔ̃]) is a municipality in the Jura bernois administrative district in the canton of Bern in Switzerland. It is located in the French-speaking part of the canton in the Jura Mountains.

== History ==
Belprahon was formerly known by its German name, Tiefenbach, though this name is no longer used.

Throughout most of its history, Belprahon was part of the lands of Moutier-Grandval Abbey and the Abbey's college of canons. After the 1797 French victory and the Treaty of Campo Formio, Belprahon became part of the French Département of Mont-Terrible. Three years later, in 1800 it became part of the Département of Haut-Rhin. After Napoleon's defeat and the Congress of Vienna, Belprahon was assigned to the Canton of Bern in 1815. The village was bypassed by the major roads through the Grand Val and so for most of its history was generally rural and agricultural. In the 1960s many commuters moved into the village and by 1990 three-quarters of the working population commuted to jobs in other towns. A majority of the workers who work in the municipality now work in the services sector.

It is the only municipality in the Grand Val that is not part of the parish of Grandval. Rather it is part of the Reformed parish of Moutier.

== Geography ==
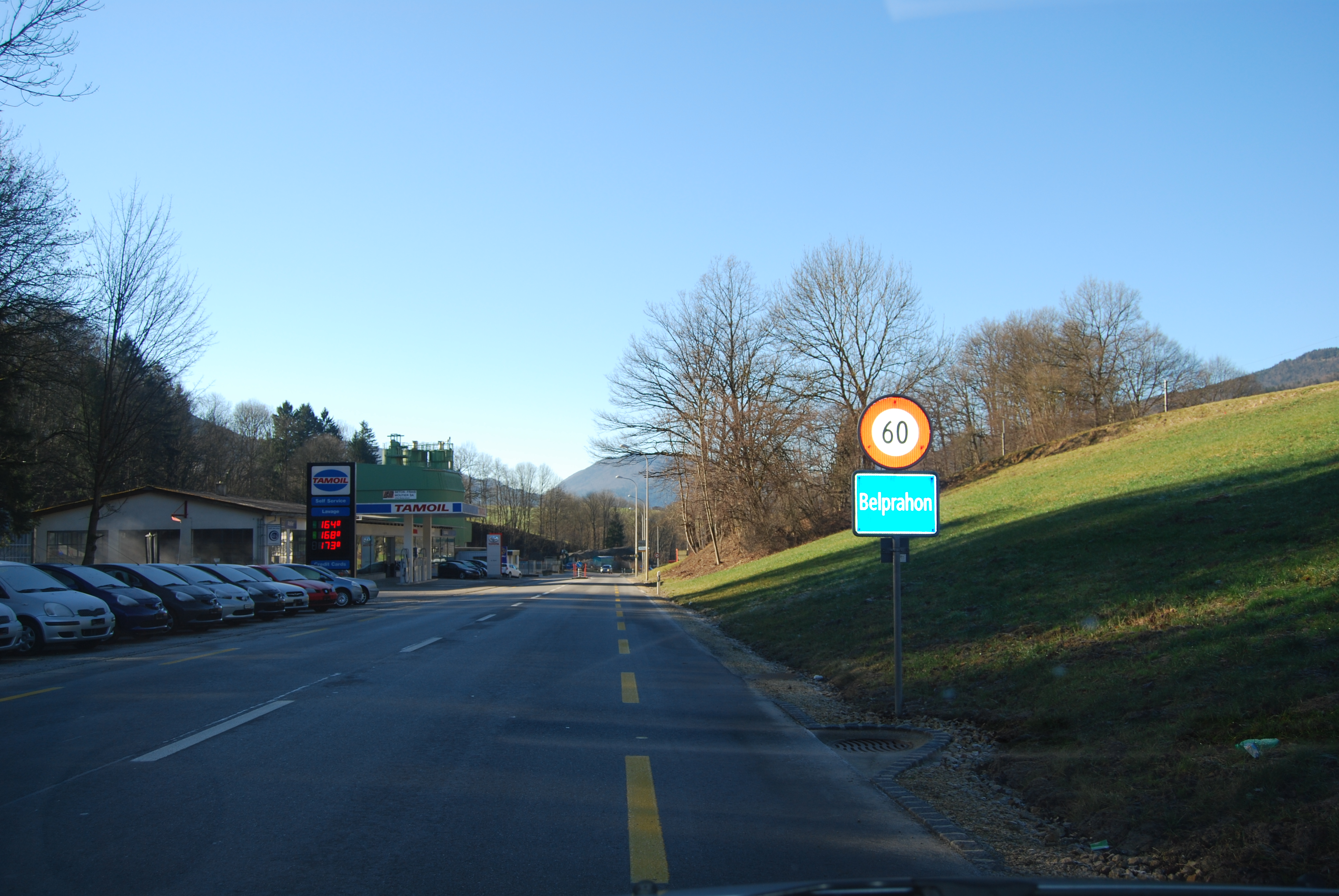
Belprahon's border and the surrounding hills

Belprahon has an area of 3.82 km^{2} (1.47 sq mi). As of 2012, a total of 1.53 km^{2} (0.59 mi^{2}) or 39.9% is used for agricultural purposes, while 2.01 km^{2} (0.78 mi^{2}) or 52.5% is forested. Of the rest of the land, 0.28 km^{2} (0.11 mi^{2}) or 7.3% is settled (buildings or roads) and 0.02 km^{2} (4.9 acres) or 0.5% is unproductive land.

Aerial view by Walter Mittelholzer (1919)

During the same year, housing and buildings made up 3.9% and transportation infrastructure made up 2.3%. Out of the forested land, 43.6% of the total land area is heavily forested and 8.9% is covered with orchards or small clusters of trees. Of the agricultural land, 12.5% is used for growing crops and 7.3% is pastures and 19.6% is used for alpine pastures.

It is located on the north flank of the Grand Val (valley of Moutier).

On 31 December 2009 District de Moutier, the municipality's former district, was dissolved. On the following day, 1 January 2010, it joined the newly created Arrondissement administratif Jura bernois.

== Coat of arms ==
The blazon of the municipal coat of arms is Per fess Azure a House with pinnacle Argent roofed Gules between two Fir Trees Vert trunked of the third and Argent a Fountain Basin between two Mullets all of the third.

== Demographics ==
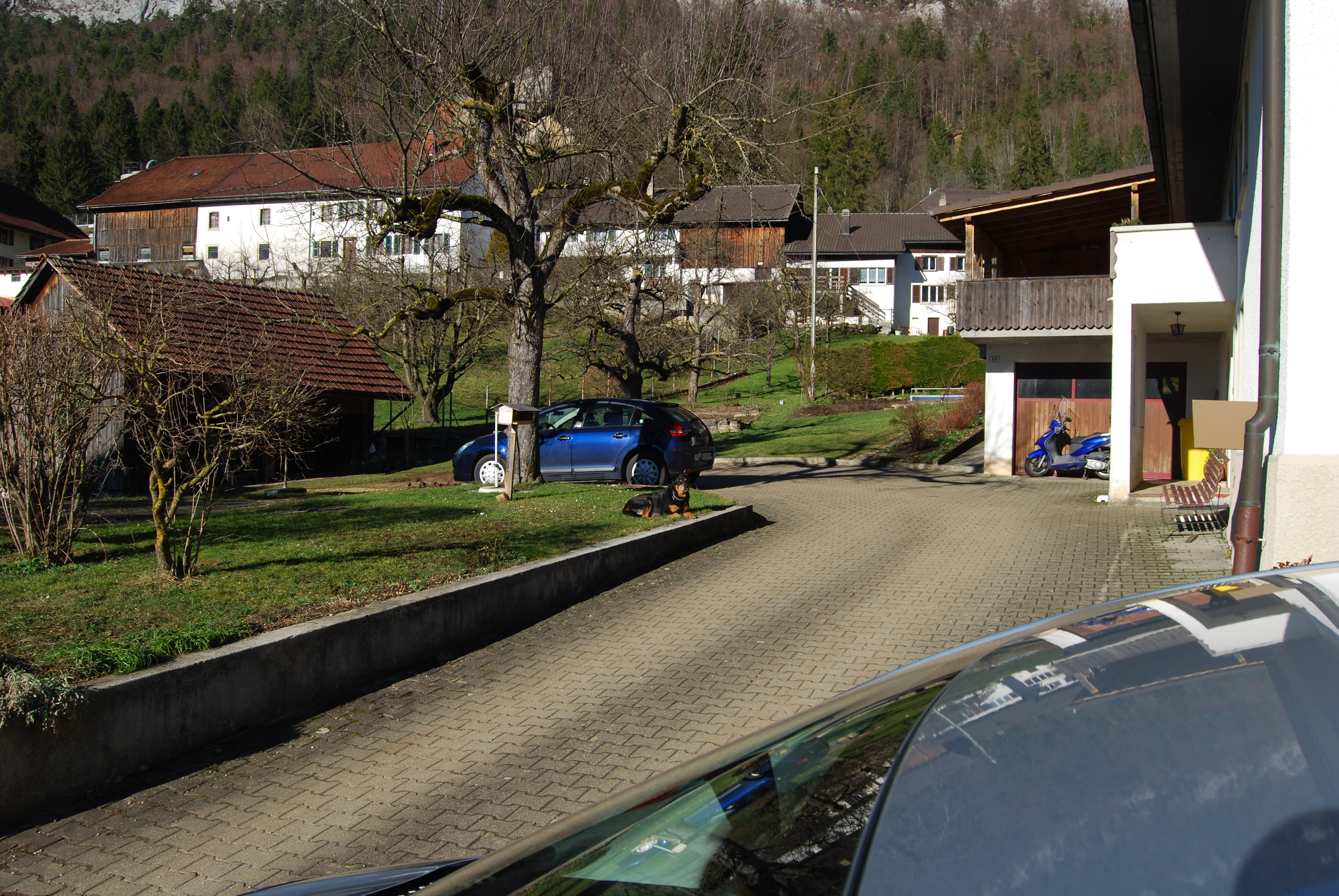
Houses in Belprahon

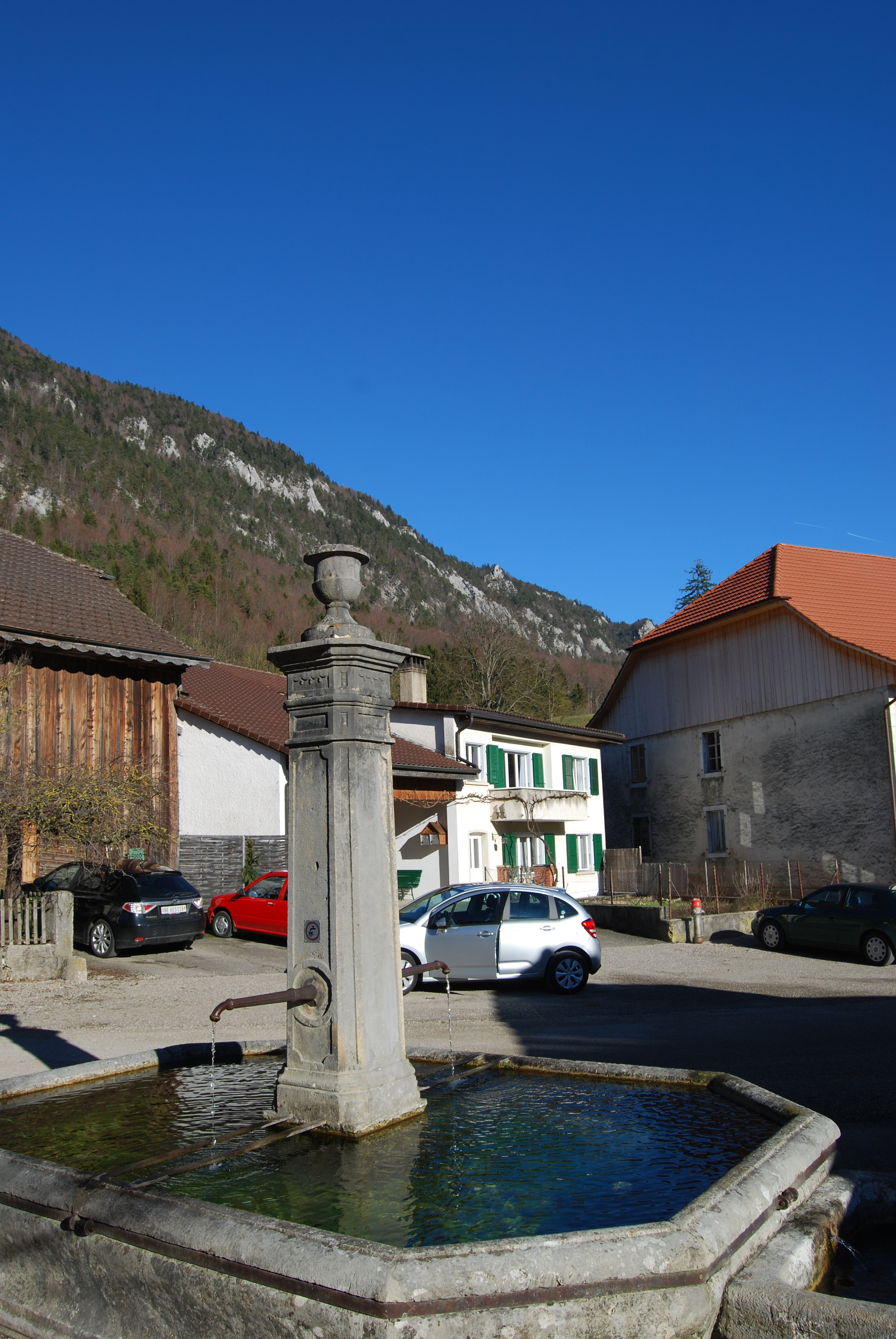
Belprahon village fountain

Belprahon has a population (as of December 2020) of 279. As of 2010, 4.0% of the population are resident foreign nationals. Over the last 10 years (2001-2011) the population has changed at a rate of 2%. Migration accounted for 1.7%, while births and deaths accounted for 0.3%.

Most of the population (as of 2000) speaks French (289 or 88.1%) as their first language, German is the second most common (21 or 6.4%) and Italian is the third (6 or 1.8%).

As of 2008, the population was 50.5% male and 49.5% female. The population was made up of 142 Swiss men (47.8% of the population) and 8 (2.7%) non-Swiss men. There were 143 Swiss women (48.1%) and 4 (1.3%) non-Swiss women. Of the population in the municipality, 66 or about 20.1% were born in Belprahon and lived there in 2000. There were 136 or 41.5% who were born in the same canton, while 77 or 23.5% were born somewhere else in Switzerland, and 39 or 11.9% were born outside of Switzerland.

As of 2011, children and teenagers (0–19 years old) make up 23.1% of the population, while adults (20–64 years old) make up 50.2% and seniors (over 64 years old) make up 26.7%.

As of 2000, there were 111 people who were single and never married in the municipality. There were 185 married individuals, 15 widows or widowers and 17 individuals who are divorced.

As of 2010, there were 26 households that consist of only one person and 12 households with five or more people. In 2000, a total of 121 apartments (89.0% of the total) were permanently occupied, while 10 apartments (7.4%) were seasonally occupied and 5 apartments (3.7%) were empty. The vacancy rate for the municipality, in 2012, was 2.04%.

The historical population is given in the following chart:

== Politics ==
In the 2011 federal election the most popular party was the Swiss People's Party (SVP) which received 29.6% of the vote. The next two most popular parties were the Social Democratic Party (SP) (20.4%), and the Christian Democratic People's Party (CVP) (17%) . In the federal election, a total of 104 votes were cast, and the voter turnout was 44.6%.

== Economy ==
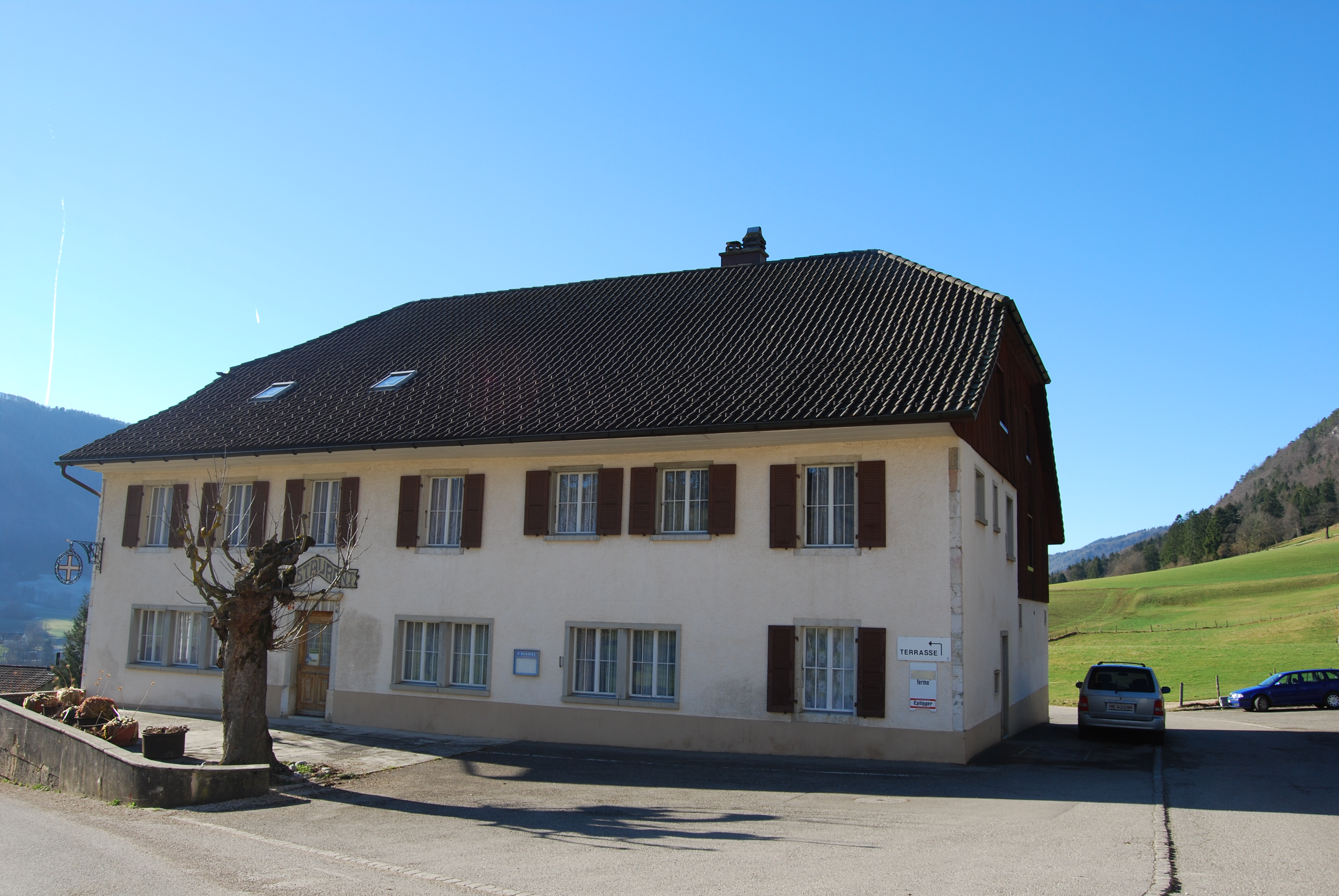
The Croix-Blanche Restaurant in Belprahon

As of 2011, Belprahon had an unemployment rate of 1.88%. As of 2008, there were a total of 67 people employed in the municipality. Of these, there were 8 people employed in the primary economic sector and about 4 businesses involved in this sector. 12 people were employed in the secondary sector and there were 2 businesses in this sector. 47 people were employed in the tertiary sector, with 9 businesses in this sector. There were 173 residents of the municipality who were employed in some capacity, of which females made up 38.7% of the workforce.

In 2008 there were a total of 56 full-time equivalent jobs. The number of jobs in the primary sector was 6, all of which were in agriculture. The number of jobs in the secondary sector was 11, all of which were in manufacturing. The number of jobs in the tertiary sector was 39. In the tertiary sector; 20 or 51.3% were in wholesale or retail sales or the repair of motor vehicles, 2 or 5.1% were in a hotel or restaurant, and 15 or 38.5% were technical professionals or scientists.

In 2000, there were 61 workers who commuted into the municipality and 138 workers who commuted away. The municipality is a net exporter of workers, with about 2.3 workers leaving the municipality for every one entering. A total of 35 workers (36.5% of the 96 total workers in the municipality) both lived and worked in Belprahon. Of the working population, 12.7% used public transportation to get to work, and 70.5% used a private car.

In 2011 the average local and cantonal tax rate on a married resident of Belprahon making 150,000 CHF was 13%, while an unmarried resident's rate was 19.1%. For comparison, the average rate for the entire canton in 2006 was 13.9% and the nationwide rate was 11.6%. In 2009 there were a total of 128 tax payers in the municipality. Of that total, 53 made over 75,000 CHF per year. The average income of the over 75,000 CHF group in Belprahon was 121,104 CHF, while the average across all of Switzerland was 130,478 CHF.

== Religion ==
From the 2000 census, 148 or 45.1% belonged to the Swiss Reformed Church, while 130 or 39.6% were Roman Catholic. Of the rest of the population, there was 1 member of an Orthodox church, and there were 24 individuals (or about 7.32% of the population) who belonged to another Christian church. There was 1 individual who was Islamic. 34 (or about 10.37% of the population) belonged to no church, are agnostic or atheist, and 2 individuals (or about 0.61% of the population) did not answer the question.

== Education ==
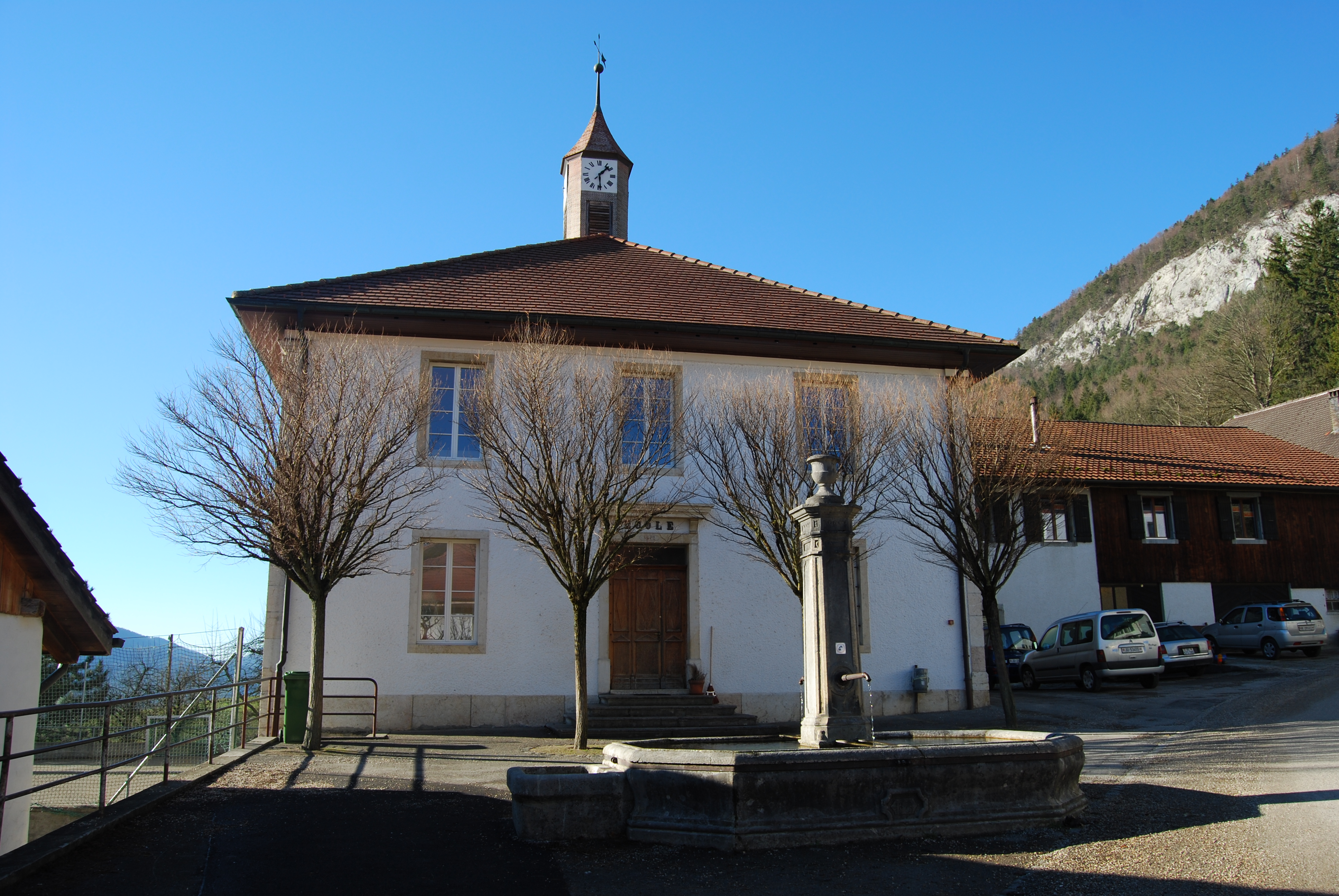
Belprahon municipal school house.

In Belprahon about 55.8% of the population have completed non-mandatory upper secondary education, and 22.1% have completed additional higher education (either university or a Fachhochschule). Of the 48 who had completed some form of tertiary schooling listed in the census, 58.3% were Swiss men, 25.0% were Swiss women.

The Canton of Bern school system provides one year of non-obligatory Kindergarten, followed by six years of Primary school. This is followed by three years of obligatory lower Secondary school where the students are separated according to ability and aptitude. Following the lower Secondary students may attend additional schooling or they may enter an apprenticeship.

During the 2011-12 school year, there were a total of 18 students attending classes in Belprahon. There were no kindergarten classes in the municipality. The municipality had one primary class and 18 students. Of the primary students, 5.6% were permanent or temporary residents of Switzerland (not citizens) and 11.1% have a different mother language than the classroom language.

As of 2000, there were a total of 24 students attending any school in the municipality. Of those, 10 both lived and attended school in the municipality, while 14 students came from another municipality. During the same year, 41 residents attended schools outside the municipality.
