= Eschert =

- Municipality
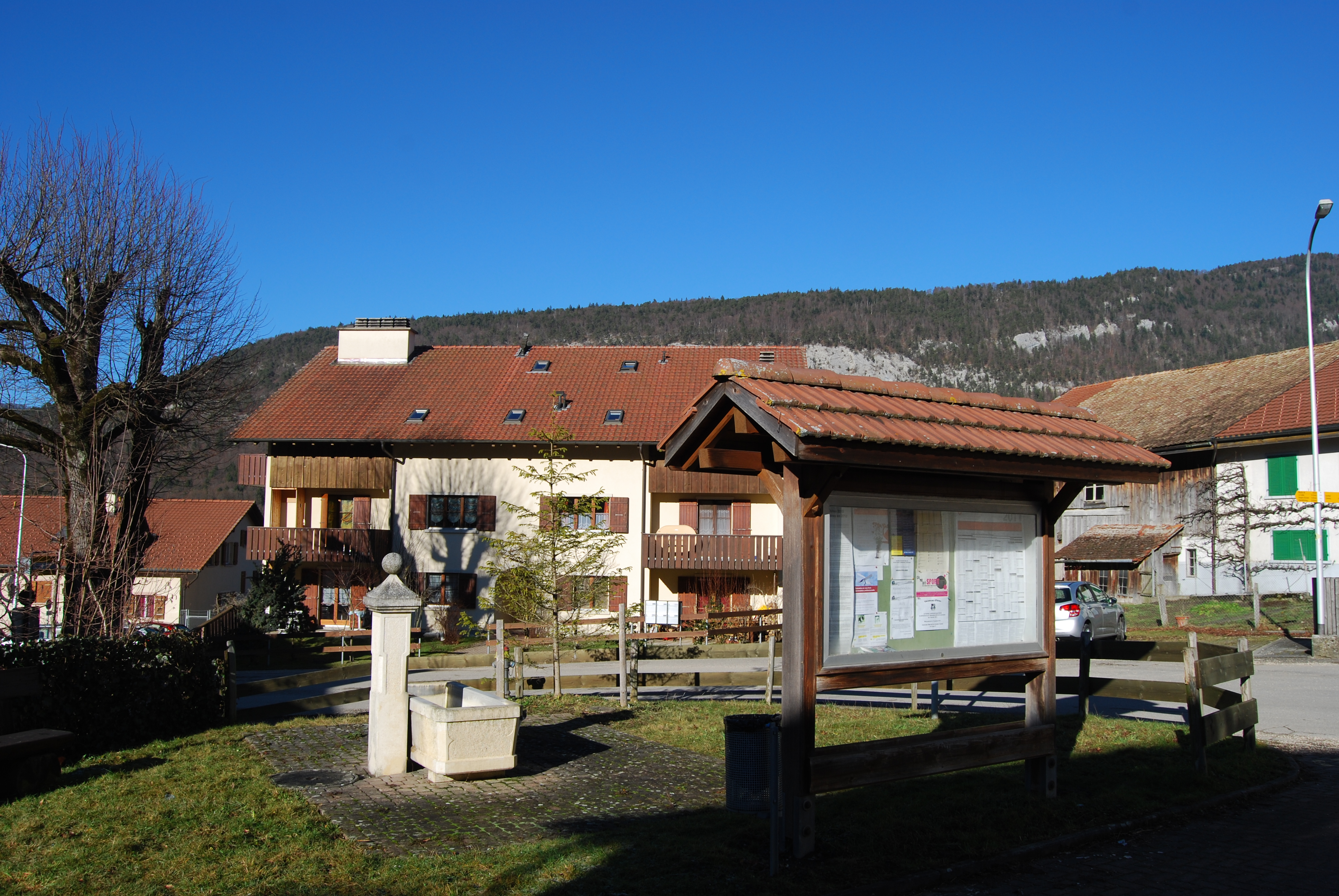
- Eschert

- Flag Coat of arms
- Location of Eschert
- Location within Switzerland Location within Canton of Bern
- Coordinates: 47°17′N 7°24′E
- Country: Switzerland
- Canton: Bern
- District: Jura bernois

Government
  - Mayor: Maire; Jean-Daniel Parrat

Area
  - Total: 6.56 km^{2} (2.53 sq mi)
- Elevation: 596 m (1,955 ft)

Population (Dec 2011)
  - Total: 372
  - Density: 56.7/km^{2} (147/sq mi)
- Time zone: UTC+01:00 (CET)
  - Summer (DST): UTC+02:00 (CEST)
- Postal code: 2743
- SFOS number: 692
- ISO 3166 code: CH-BE
- Surrounded by: Court, Moutier, Belprahon, Grandval, Gänsbrunnen (SO)
- Website: www.eschert.ch

Eschert (French pronunciation: [eʃɛʁ]) is a municipality in the Jura bernois administrative district in the canton of Bern in Switzerland. It is located in the French-speaking Bernese Jura (Jura Bernois).

== History ==
Eschert is first mentioned in 1179 as Escert.

For much of its history, the village was owned by Moutier-Grandval Abbey. In 1531 the parish church of Grandval along with the entire parish, including Eschert, converted to the new faith of the Protestant Reformation. In 1733 a fire destroyed most of the buildings in the village. After the 1797 French victory and the Treaty of Campo Formio, Eschert became part of the French Département of Mont-Terrible. Three years later in 1800, it became part of the Département of Haut-Rhin. After Napoleon's defeat and the Congress of Vienna, Eschert was assigned to the Canton of Bern in 1815.

The municipality is not on any of the major roads or railroads in the Grand Val and so remained isolated, rural and generally agrarian into the 20th century. Today an increasing number of commuters live in Eschert and work in factories in the surrounding municipalities.

== Geography ==
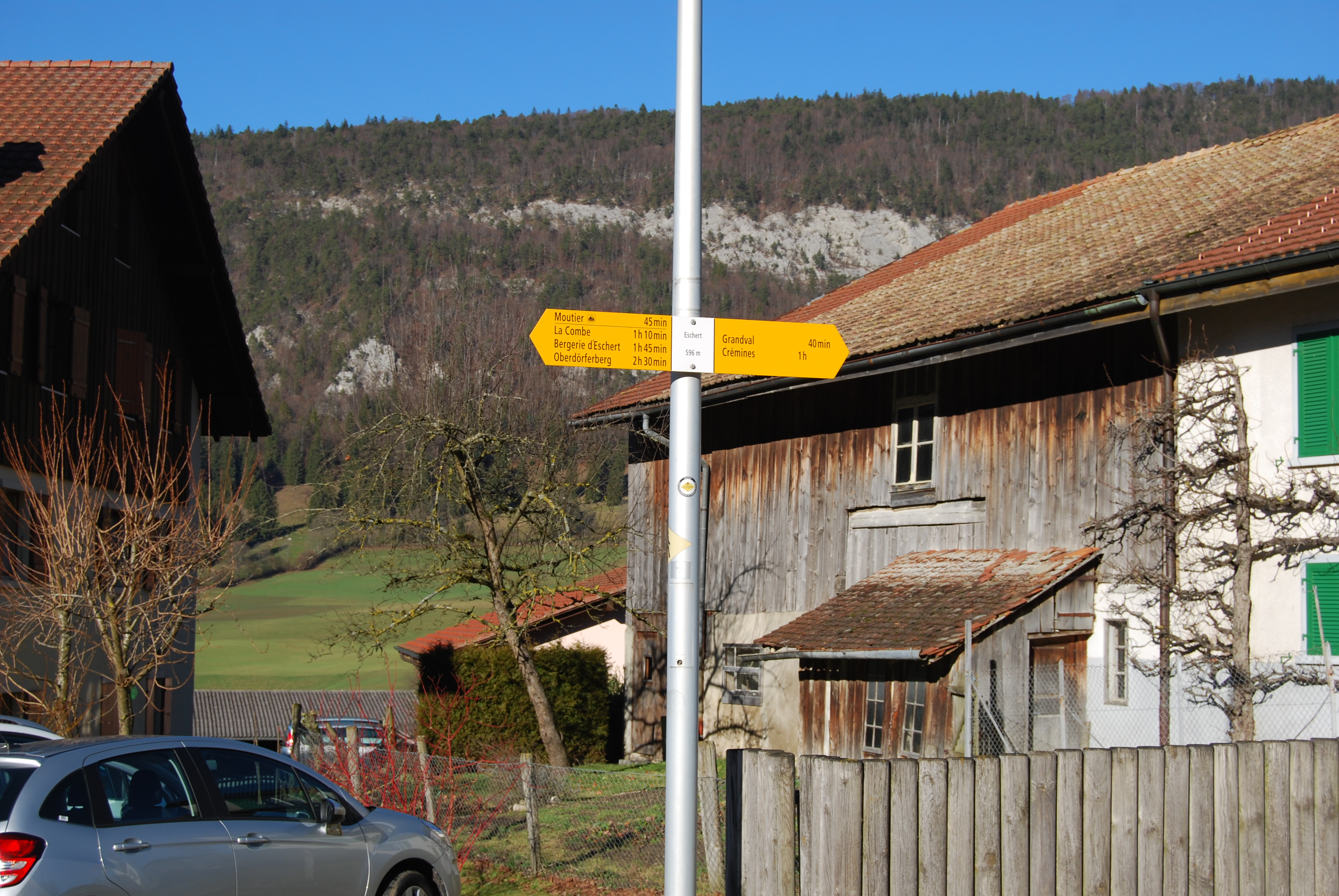
Eschert village and the surrounding mountains

Eschert has an area of 6.58 km^{2} (2.54 sq mi). As of 2012, a total of 2.64 km^{2} (1.02 mi^{2}) or 40.1% is used for agricultural purposes, while 3.66 km^{2} (1.41 mi^{2}) or 55.6% is forested. Of the rest of the land, 0.27 km^{2} (0.10 mi^{2}) or 4.1% is settled (buildings or roads), 0.02 km^{2} (4.9 acres) or 0.3% is either rivers or lakes and 0.01 km^{2} (2.5 acres) or 0.2% is unproductive land.

During the same year, housing and buildings made up 2.6% and transportation infrastructure made up 0.5%. Out of the forested land, 49.2% of the total land area is heavily forested and 6.4% is covered with orchards or small clusters of trees. Of the agricultural land, 8.8% is used for growing crops and 11.9% is pastures and 19.1% is used for alpine pastures. All the water in the municipality is flowing water.

Eschert is a star shaped village on the southern side of the Grand Val (valley of Moutier). A portion of the village is along the Raus (Sous la Rive) on the border of Moutier.

On 31 December 2009 District de Moutier, the municipality's former district, was dissolved. On the following day, 1 January 2010, it joined the newly created Arrondissement administratif Jura bernois.

== Coat of arms ==
The blazon of the municipal coat of arms is Argent seven Ears Gules in bend 2-3-2.

== Demographics ==
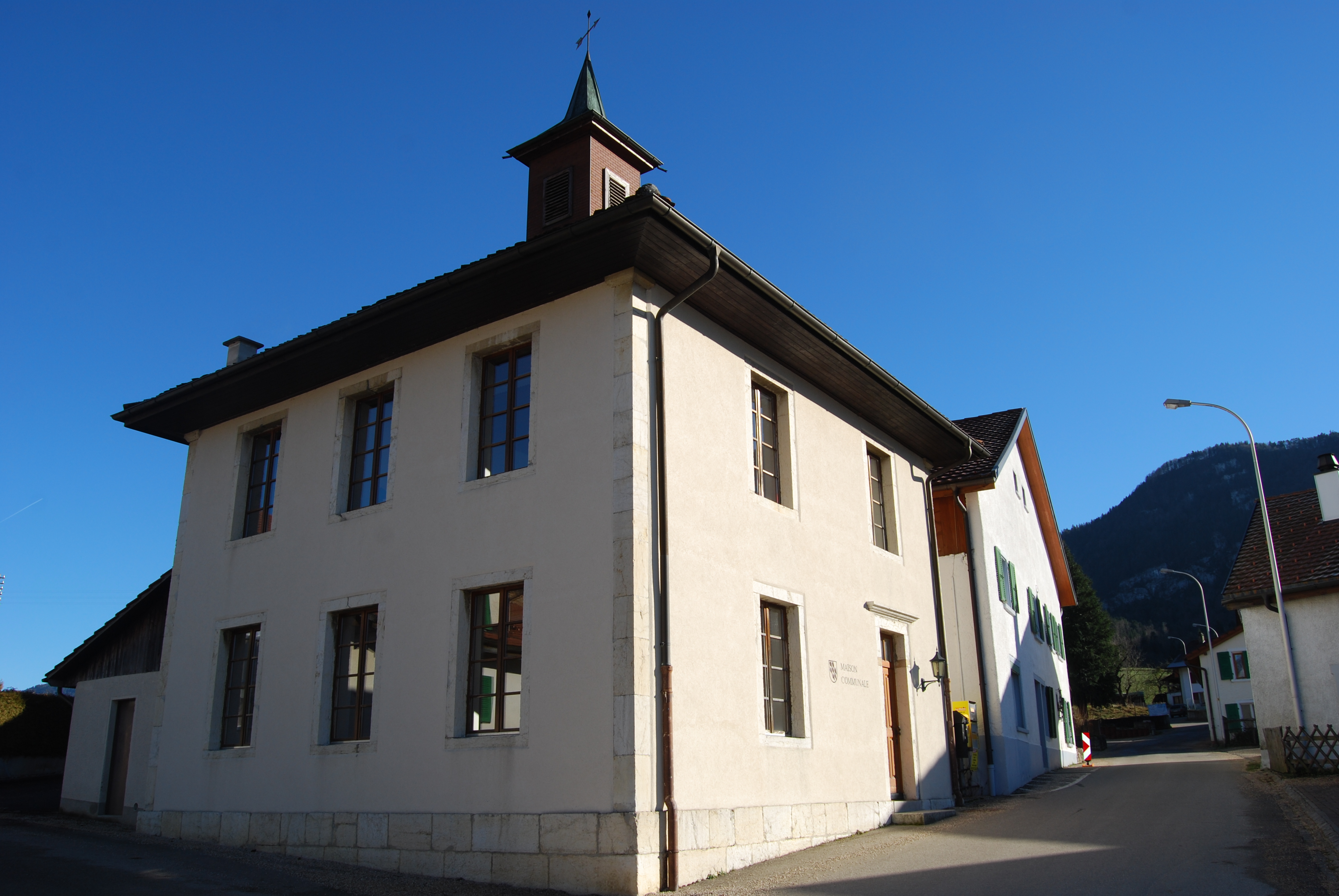
Municipal administration building in Eschert

Eschert has a population (as of December 2020) of 377. As of 2010, 16.7% of the population are resident foreign nationals. Over the last 10 years (2001-2011) the population has changed at a rate of -1.6%. Migration accounted for 0.5%, while births and deaths accounted for -0.5%.

Most of the population (as of 2000) speaks French (298 or 83.7%) as their first language, German is the second most common (29 or 8.1%) and Italian is the third (10 or 2.8%).

As of 2008, the population was 53.4% male and 46.6% female. The population was made up of 164 Swiss men (43.4% of the population) and 38 (10.1%) non-Swiss men. There were 151 Swiss women (39.9%) and 25 (6.6%) non-Swiss women. Of the population in the municipality, 99 or about 27.8% were born in Eschert and lived there in 2000. There were 127 or 35.7% who were born in the same canton, while 53 or 14.9% were born somewhere else in Switzerland, and 72 or 20.2% were born outside of Switzerland.

As of 2011, children and teenagers (0–19 years old) make up 23.1% of the population, while adults (20–64 years old) make up 58.3% and seniors (over 64 years old) make up 18.5%.

As of 2000, there were 126 people who were single and never married in the municipality. There were 202 married individuals, 17 widows or widowers and 11 individuals who are divorced.

As of 2010, there were 34 households that consist of only one person and 18 households with five or more people. In 2000, a total of 136 apartments (86.1% of the total) were permanently occupied, while 11 apartments (7.0%) were seasonally occupied and 11 apartments (7.0%) were empty. As of 2010, the construction rate of new housing units was 5.3 new units per 1000 residents. The vacancy rate for the municipality, in 2012, was 4.44%. In 2011, single family homes made up 61.5% of the total housing in the municipality.

The historical population is given in the following chart:

== Politics ==
In the 2011 federal election the most popular party was the Swiss People's Party (SVP) which received 44.8% of the vote. The next three most popular parties were the Social Democratic Party (SP) (16.8%), the FDP.The Liberals (8.7%) and another local party (7.4%). In the federal election, a total of 93 votes were cast, and the voter turnout was 38.0%.

== Economy ==
As of 2011, Eschert had an unemployment rate of 1.68%. As of 2008, there were a total of 125 people employed in the municipality. Of these, there were 16 people employed in the primary economic sector and about 7 businesses involved in this sector. 87 people were employed in the secondary sector and there were 7 businesses in this sector. 22 people were employed in the tertiary sector, with 5 businesses in this sector. There were 176 residents of the municipality who were employed in some capacity, of which females made up 36.9% of the workforce.

In 2008 there were a total of 112 full-time equivalent jobs. The number of jobs in the primary sector was 11, all of which were in agriculture. The number of jobs in the secondary sector was 82 of which 58 or (70.7%) were in manufacturing and 24 (29.3%) were in construction. The number of jobs in the tertiary sector was 19. In the tertiary sector; 13 or 68.4% were in wholesale or retail sales or the repair of motor vehicles, 1 was in the movement and storage of goods, 3 or 15.8% were in a hotel or restaurant, 1 was in education and 2 or 10.5% were in health care.

In 2000, there were 75 workers who commuted into the municipality and 108 workers who commuted away. The municipality is a net exporter of workers, with about 1.4 workers leaving the municipality for every one entering. A total of 68 workers (47.6% of the 143 total workers in the municipality) both lived and worked in Eschert.

Of the working population, 15.9% used public transportation to get to work, and 59.7% used a private car.

In 2011 the average local and cantonal tax rate on a married resident, with two children, of Eschert making 150,000 CHF was 13.2%, while an unmarried resident's rate was 19.4%. For comparison, the rate for the entire canton in the same year, was 14.2% and 22.0%, while the nationwide rate was 12.3% and 21.1% respectively. In 2009 there were a total of 155 tax payers in the municipality. Of that total, 50 made over 75,000 CHF per year. The average income of the over 75,000 CHF group in Eschert was 106,112 CHF, while the average across all of Switzerland was 130,478 CHF. In 2011 a total of 1.6% of the population received direct financial assistance from the government.

== Religion ==
From the 2000 census, 173 or 48.6% belonged to the Swiss Reformed Church, while 118 or 33.1% were Roman Catholic. Of the rest of the population, there was 1 member of an Orthodox church, there were 2 individuals (or about 0.56% of the population) who belonged to the Christian Catholic Church, and there were 17 individuals (or about 4.78% of the population) who belonged to another Christian church. There was 1 individual who was Islamic. There was 1 person who was Buddhist. 34 (or about 9.55% of the population) belonged to no church, are agnostic or atheist, and 9 individuals (or about 2.53% of the population) did not answer the question.

== Education ==
In Eschert about 53.1% of the population have completed non-mandatory upper secondary education, and 10.8% have completed additional higher education (either university or a Fachhochschule). Of the 21 who had completed some form of tertiary schooling listed in the census, 61.9% were Swiss men, 33.3% were Swiss women.

The Canton of Bern school system provides one year of non-obligatory Kindergarten, followed by six years of Primary school. This is followed by three years of obligatory lower Secondary school where the students are separated according to ability and aptitude. Following the lower Secondary students may attend additional schooling or they may enter an apprenticeship.

During the 2011–12 school year, there were a total of 50 students attending classes in Eschert. There was one kindergarten class with a total of 14 students in the municipality. Of the kindergarten students, 7.1% have a different mother language than the classroom language. The municipality had 2 primary classes and 36 students. Of the primary students, 11.1% were permanent or temporary residents of Switzerland (not citizens) and 2.8% have a different mother language than the classroom language.

As of 2000, there were a total of 35 students attending any school in the municipality. Of those, 8 both lived and attended school in the municipality, while 27 students came from another municipality. During the same year, 41 residents attended schools outside the municipality.
