= List of people with osteogenesis imperfecta =

This is a list of notable people who have osteogenesis imperfecta.

== Activists and speakers ==
- Bobbie Lea Bennett – American transgender and disability rights activist.
- Raul Krauthausen – German/Colombian activist and recipient of the Order of Merit of Germany.
- Florence Mudzingwa – Zimbabwean disability rights activist, social enterprise founder and writer
- Robby Novak (stage name Kid President) – a motivational speaker and YouTube personality as of 2013. He often comments on his own ability to overcome the disorder.
- Peter Radtke – German founder of Die Deutsche Gesellschaft für Osteogenesis Imperfecta, also a philologist and actor.
- Sean Stephenson – an American therapist, self-help author and motivational speaker.
- Kat Watkins - Welsh disability activist

== Entertainers ==
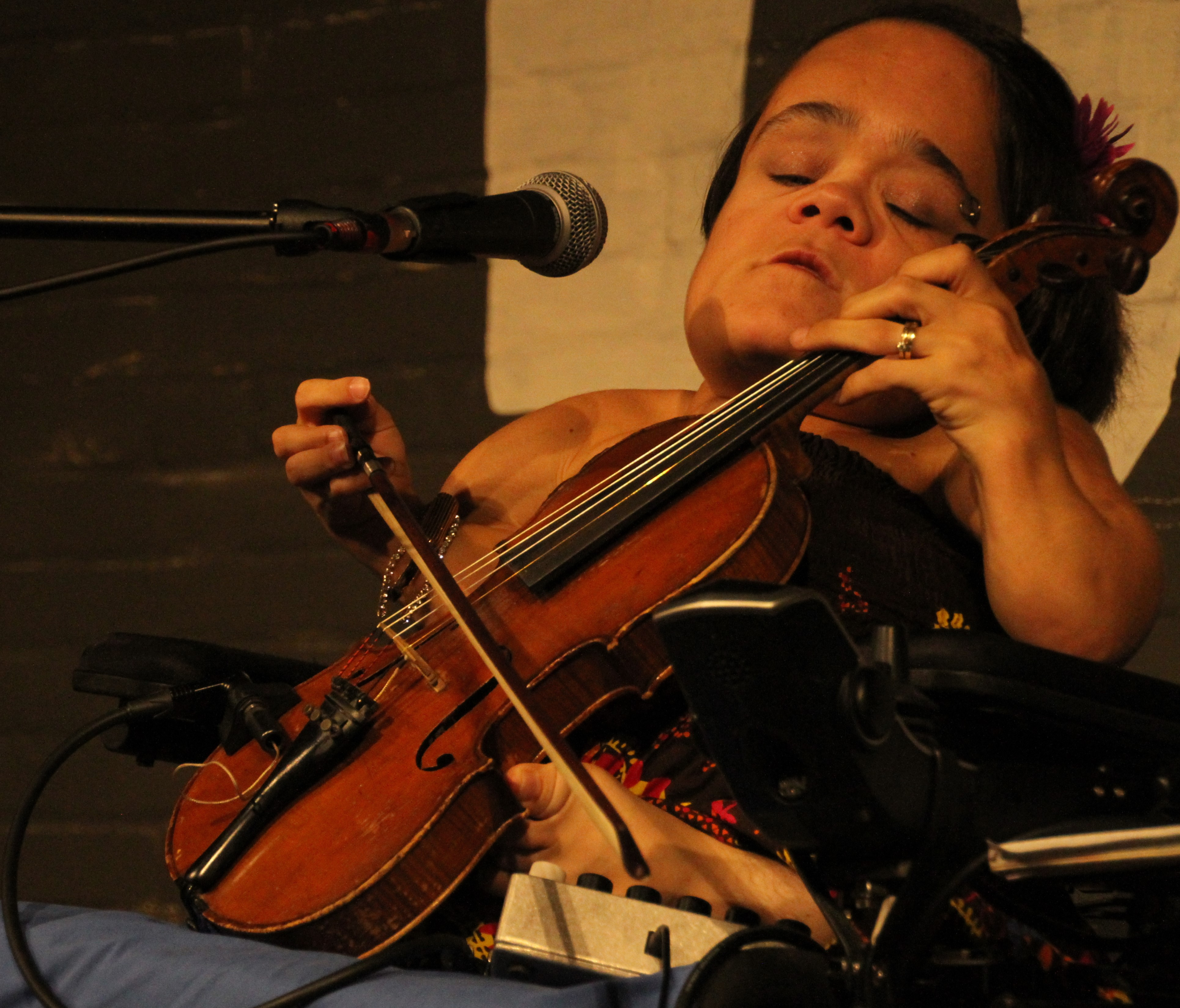
Gaelynn Lea playing violin

=== Actors ===
- Jack Binstead – British actor known for a role in the British sitcom Bad Education.
- Julie Fernandez – British actress best known for her role in the British The Office.
- Rick Howland – Canadian actor who is known for playing Trick on Lost Girl.
- Kerry Ingram – British child actress best known for her role as Shireen Baratheon in the HBO series Game of Thrones and Matilda Wormwood in Matilda the Musical.
- Quentin Kenihan – Australian reality TV personality who played Corpus Colossus in Mad Max: Fury Road.
- Tarah Lynne Schaeffer – Sesame Street actress.
- Nabil Shaban – A Jordanian-British actor and writer who founded Graeae Theatre Company, which promotes performers with disabilities.
- Atticus Shaffer – American who plays Brick Heck on The Middle.
- Michael J. Anderson - Retired American actor best known for his role as The Man from Another Place in David Lynch and Mark Frost’s series Twin Peaks, and its prequel film Twin Peaks: Fire Walk with Me.

=== Comedians ===
- Guillaume Bats – A French humorist.

=== Musicians ===
- Chris Anderson - jazz pianist.
- Jake Hardman - chamber pop artist from Manchester, U.K.
- Randy Guss – Drummer for Toad the Wet Sprocket.
- Kalyn Heffernan – A Hip-hop artist and producer known for the group Wheelchair Sports Camp.
- Gaelynn Lea – A violinist who has worked with Alan Sparhawk and won an NPR Music contest.
- Michel Petrucciani – French jazz pianist who was granted a Légion d'honneur in Paris.
- Pernille Vallentin – Danish singer who also acts.
- Jay Thomas Manuel – Music producer and social media influencer known as Mini Producer
- Sparsh Shah - Indian American rapper, singer, songwriter and inspirational speaker from New Jersey, US.

== Journalists and writers ==
- Franco Bomprezzi – An Italian journalist who received the Order of Merit in 2007.
- Magdalena Buczek – Polish journalist and radio announcer associated to Radio Maryja.
- Dyson Carter – Canadian writer, editor, and political activist.
- Christopher Hewitt – British poet and namesake of the Christopher Hewitt Award.
- Natalie Lloyd – Children's author.
- Firdaus Kanga – Parsi playwright known for Trying to Grow.
- Philippe Rahmy – French speaking poet and novelist who has received the Prix Dentan among others.

Gregory Smith, author of Stronger Than Bone. Social Worker.

- Stella Young – Australian comedian and journalist.

== Politicians ==
- Nicky Chapman, Baroness Chapman – A British peer and disability rights activist.
- Theresia Haidlmayr – She had been a politician of Austria's The Greens – The Green Alternative.
- Freyja Haraldsdóttir – A member of the Icelandic Constitutional Assembly of 2010.

== People in sports and games ==
- Valentin Baus – German Paralympic silver medalist in table tennis.
- McKenzie Coan – American Paralympic gold medalist in swimming.
- Doug Herland – American Olympic bronze medalist coxswain.
- Taylor Lipsett – An American Paralympic gold and bronze medalist in ice sledge hockey.
- Bobby Nail – American bridge player in the ACBL Hall of Fame.
- Josef Neumaier – A Paralympic multiple medalist in shooting for Germany.
- Nadia Porras – A Paralympic swimmer for Mexico.
- Jeremy Synot – A former Australian wheelchair basketball player and current National Wheelchair Basketball League Head Coach of the RSL Queensland Spinning Bullets.
- Jordanne Whiley – A British Paralympic bronze medalist in Wheelchair tennis at the 2012 Summer Paralympics.
- Kara (Sheridan) Ayers – An American Paralympic swimmer and American record holder.

== Notable as a subject ==
- Madge Bester – A South African woman and formerly the "world's shortest living woman".
- Leo Beuerman – The subject of the documentary Leo Beuerman, which was nominated for the Academy Award for Best Documentary (Short Subject).
- Lin Yü-chih – He had once been counted as the "world's shortest man".

== Royalty ==
- Prince Oddone, Duke of Montferrat – member of House of Savoy.

== Technology ==
- Fredrick Brennan – software developer and type designer who founded the imageboard website 8chan.

== Disputed ==
- French artist Henri de Toulouse-Lautrec. His short stature and health problems are believed to have been due to congenital factors, but he was never diagnosed with a specific disorder and recent theories suggest that he had a mild form of osteopetrosis instead.
- Viking invader of England, Ivar the Boneless: There is notable speculation about his physical condition; but objective diagnosis is not possible since his skeleton was exhumed and burnt 200 years after his death by William the Conqueror.

== Fictional cases ==
Figures in film, television, video games and novels depicted as having osteogenesis imperfecta include:

- Samuel L. Jackson's character Elijah Price in M. Night Shyamalan's 2000 film Unbreakable and its 2019 follow-up Glass, who was born with type I osteogenesis imperfecta and who adopts his childhood nickname "Mr. Glass" as a villain identity.
- Asa Butterfield's character Gardner Elliot in the 2017 film The Space Between Us has with osteogenesis imperfecta due to being born on the planet Mars.
- Ivana Baquero's character Mandy from the 2005 film Fragile had osteogenesis imperfecta. Her nurse becomes obsessed with her and abuses her to keep her injured enough to not be discharged from the hospital, before eventually murdering her and committing suicide.
- V.C. Andrews's character Vera from the 1982 book and 2015 film My Sweet Audrina had osteogenesis imperfecta. As a child, she sometimes intentionally broke her bones because after a break was the only time that her neglectful and abusive father ever showed her affection. As an adult, she dies from falling down a flight of stairs.
- Jodi Picoult's character Willow O'Keefe from the 2009 book Handle with Care is born with type III Osteogenesis imperfecta. The book centers a wrongful birth lawsuit filed by Willow's mother against her doctor.
- Jeff "Joker" Moreau, a pilot from the Mass Effect video game series. Due to the advanced technology in the series' science-fiction setting, Joker uses medication, braces and cybernetic implants that allow him to walk and dance, though not as fluidly as those without the disease.
- In Grey's Anatomy, Samuel Norbert Avery, the son of Jackson Avery and April Kepner, had type II osteogenesis imperfecta. He was baptized and died within minutes.
- The titular character of Frank Portman's novel Andromeda Klein has osteogenesis imperfecta, making her hard-of-hearing.
- The 2025 film The Unbreakable Boy, based on the true story of Austin LeRette, portrays a boy living with osteogenesis imperfecta and autism. The film explores his family's experiences. The film is based on a memoir written by Austin's father, Scott LaRette.
- In the 2001 French film Amélie, the protagonist's neighbor suffers from osteogenesis imperfecta, which has prevented him from leaving his apartment for 20 years.
