= The Lazarus Project =

The Lazarus Project may refer to:

- The Lazarus Project (film), 2008 American drama/thriller film
- The Lazarus Project (novel), 2008 historical novel
- The Lazarus Project (TV series), 2022 science fiction series

== See also ==
- Project: Lazarus, 2003 Doctor Who audio drama
