= Noëlle Revaz =

Swiss writer (born 1968)

- Born: 1968 (age 57–58); Vernayaz, Valais, Switzerland
- Education: University of Lausanne
- Spouse: Michael Stauffer
- Writing career
- Language: French
- Notable work: Rapport aux bêtes (tr: With the Animals)

Noëlle Revaz (born 1968) is a Swiss author, who writes in French. She is best known for her first novel, Rapport aux bêtes (tr: With the Animals), which won several literary awards, including the Schiller Prize, the Prix Marguerite Audoux, the Prix Lettres Frontière, and the Henri Gaspoz Prize, and has been adapted for stage and film.

== Life ==
Noëlle Revaz was born in Vernayaz, Valais, in Switzerland, in 1968, and was one of nine siblings. She studied at the Collège de l'Abbaye de Saint-Maurice, and later at the University of Lausanne, where she graduated in 1995 with a degree in Latin, French, and medieval French. She then worked as an educator for several years thereafter, teaching Latin. She currently teaches at the Institut littéraire suisse, in Biel. Revaz is married to Swiss author Michael Stauffer.

== Career ==
From 1995 to 1996, Revaz wrote for radio under the pseudonym, Maurice Salanfe.

Revaz published her first book, Rapport aux bêtes (tr: With the Animals), in 2001, with Gallimard. It won multiple literary awards, including the Schiller Prize, the Marguerite Audoux Prize, the Prix Lettres Frontière, and the Henri Gaspoz Prize. It was translated widely, including into German, as on wegen den Tieren by Andreas Münzner, into Italian as Cuore di bestia by Maurizia Balmelli, and into English, as With the Animals, by William Donald Wilson for Dalkey Archive Press. Rapport aux bêtes was adapted for the stage in Switzerland in 2004, at the Le Poche Geneve, and in Germany as well. It was also adapted for film in France in 2009, as Cœur animal (tr: Animal Heart). The book is narrated by the protagonist, Paul, a man who controls his family, consisting of his wife and children, through violence and abuse, but finds his authority challenged when a new farmhand, Jorge, pushes back against his control.

Revaz's second book, Efina, won the Dentan Prize in 2010. In 2014, she published L’Infini Livre, which won the Swiss Literature Award in the following year. She has also published a collection of short stories, titled Hermine Blanche (Gallimard).

Revaz also writes for theatre and radio, and has written a radio play commissioned by France Culture, titled Sur les berges, as well as the scripts for the stage adaptations of her own book, Rapport aux bêtes.

== Awards and honors ==
Year	Award / honor	For	Reference
2002	Schiller Prize	Rapport aux bêtes	
2002	Prix Marguerite Audoux	Rapport aux bêtes	
2003	Henri Gaspoz Prize	Rapport aux bêtes	
2007	SSA Prize for Plays	Quand Mamie	
2010	Dentan Prize	Efina	
2011	Prix Alpha of Bern Canton	Efina	
2012	Prix Alpes Jura der ADELF	Quand Mamie	
2015	Swiss Literature Awards	L’Infini Livre	
2022	Gottfried-Keller-Preis		

== Bibliography ==
- Rapport aux bêtes, Paris, Gallimard, 2002
  - Translated into German: Von wegen den Tieren (translator: Andreas Münzner. Basel, Urs Engeler, 2004)
  - Translated into Italian: Cuore di bestia (translator: Maurizia Balmelli, Rovereto, Keller, 2013.) ISBN 978-88-89767-44-3
  - Translated into English, With the Animals (translator: William Donald Williams, Dalkey Archive Press) ISBN 978-1-56478-755-2
- Efina, Paris, Gallimard, 2009
  - Translated into Italian: Tanti cari saluti, (translator: Maurizia Balmelli, Rovereto, Keller, 2014).
  - Translated into German: Efina (translator: Andreas Münzner, Wallstein Verlag) ISBN 3-8353-4411-0
- Quand Mamie, postf. de Muriel Zeender, Geneva, Zoé, 2011. ISBN 978-2-88182-694-8
- Gipfel – Col – Valle (with Franz Hohler and Giovanni Orelli, Zürich, Limmat, 2014)
- L'Infini livre, (Carouge-Genève, Zoé, 2014)
- Hermine Blanche et autre novelles (Gallimard, 2017) ISBN 978-2-07-271015-5
