= Murska Sobota =

- Town
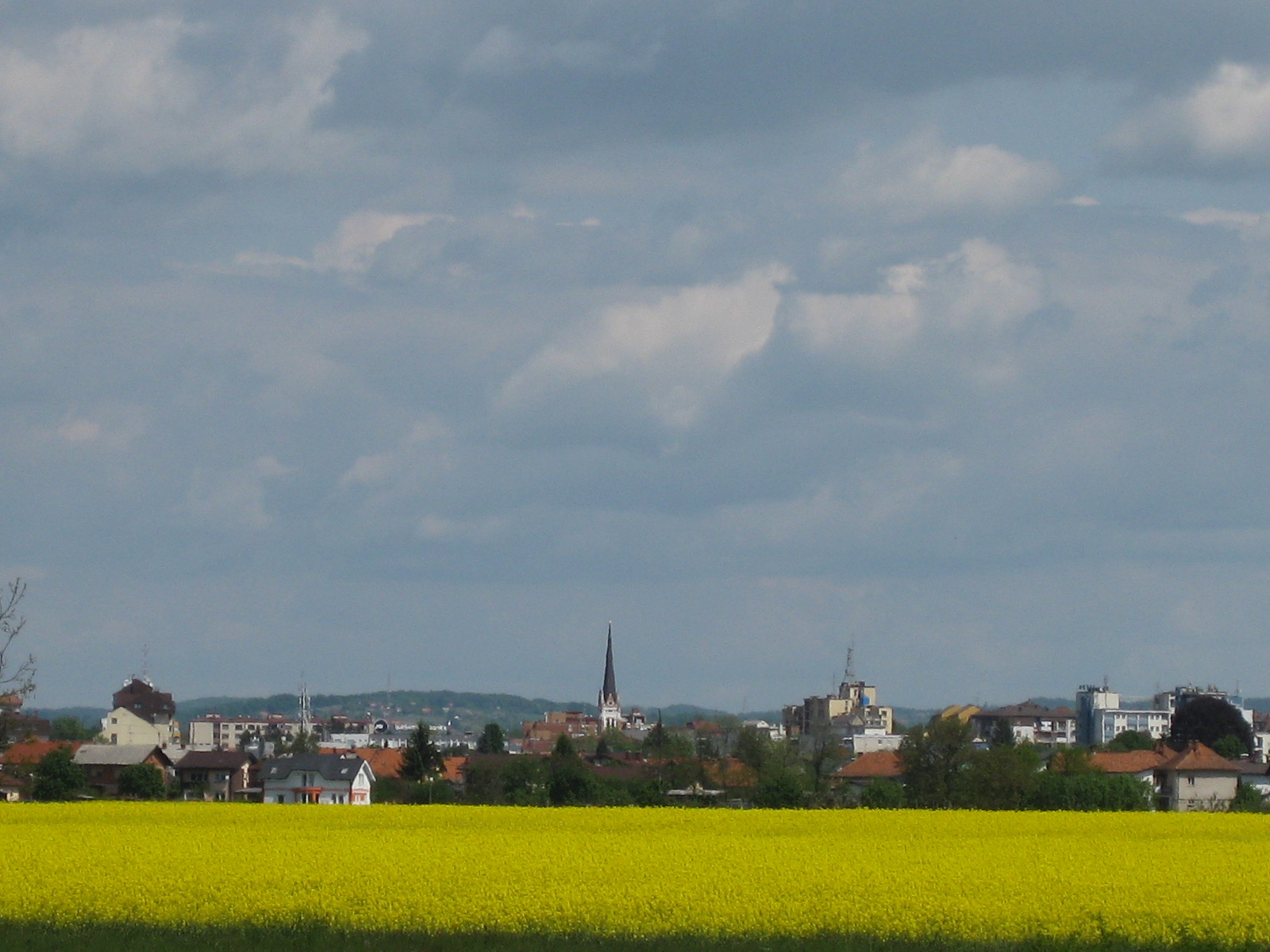
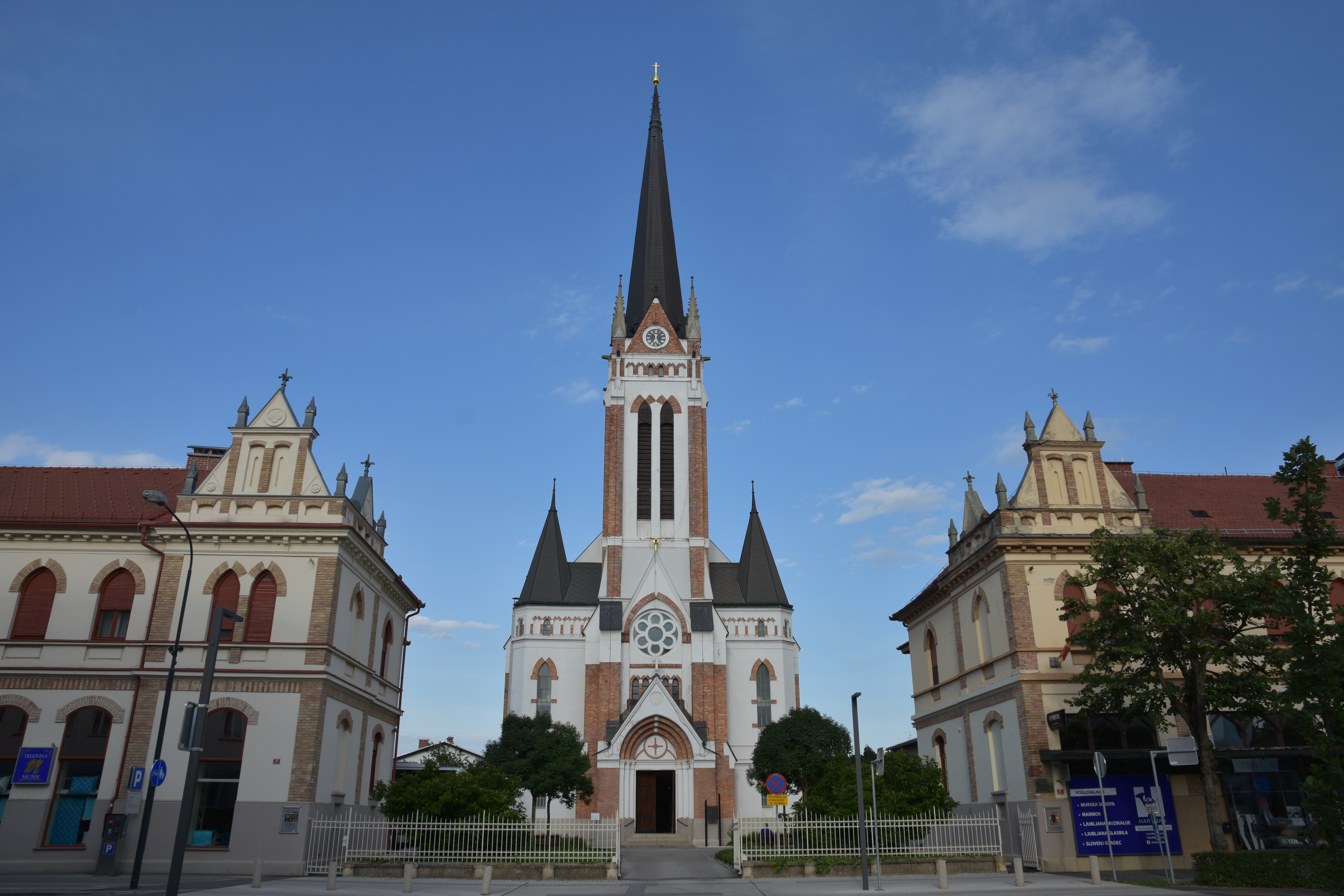
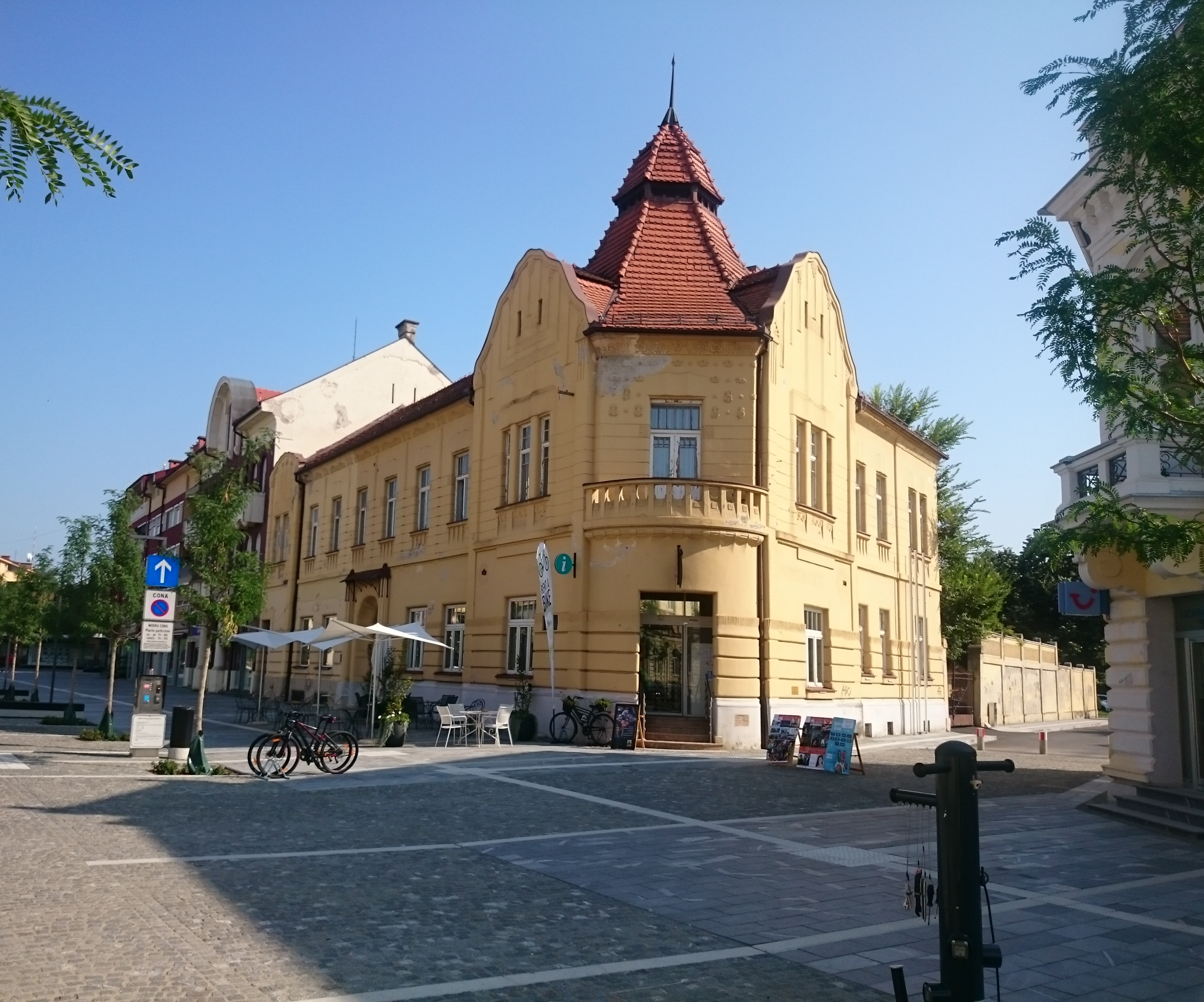
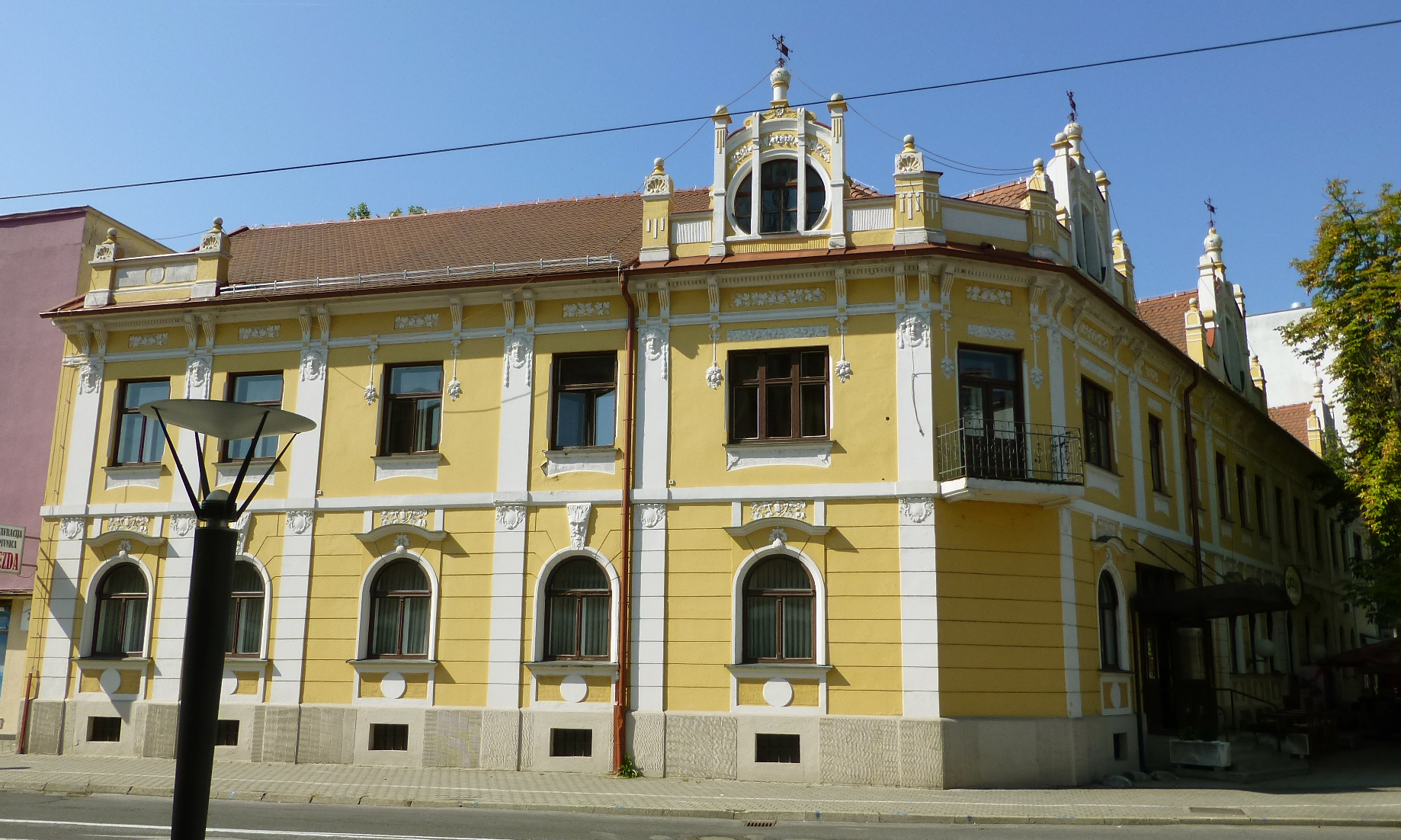
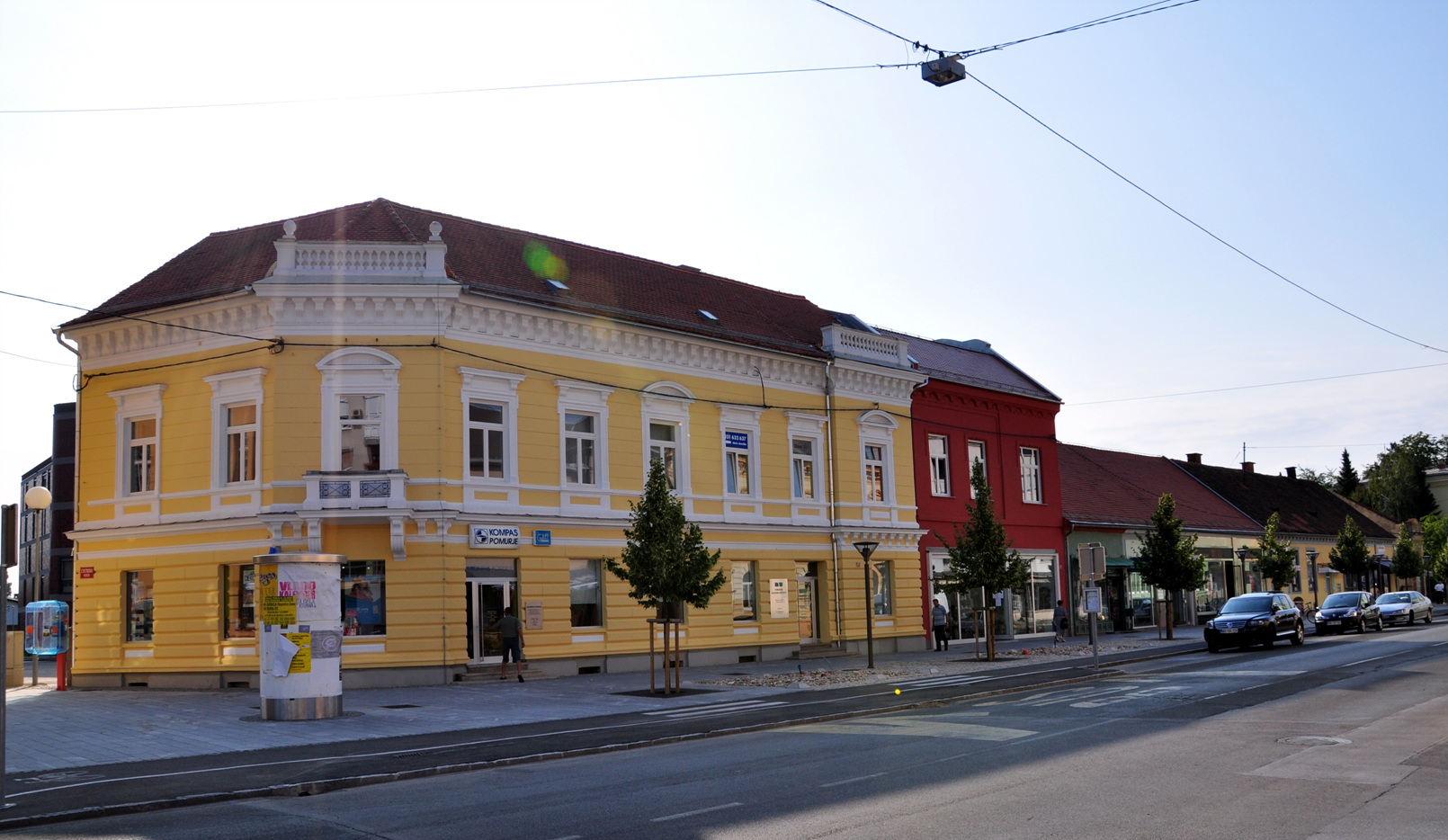
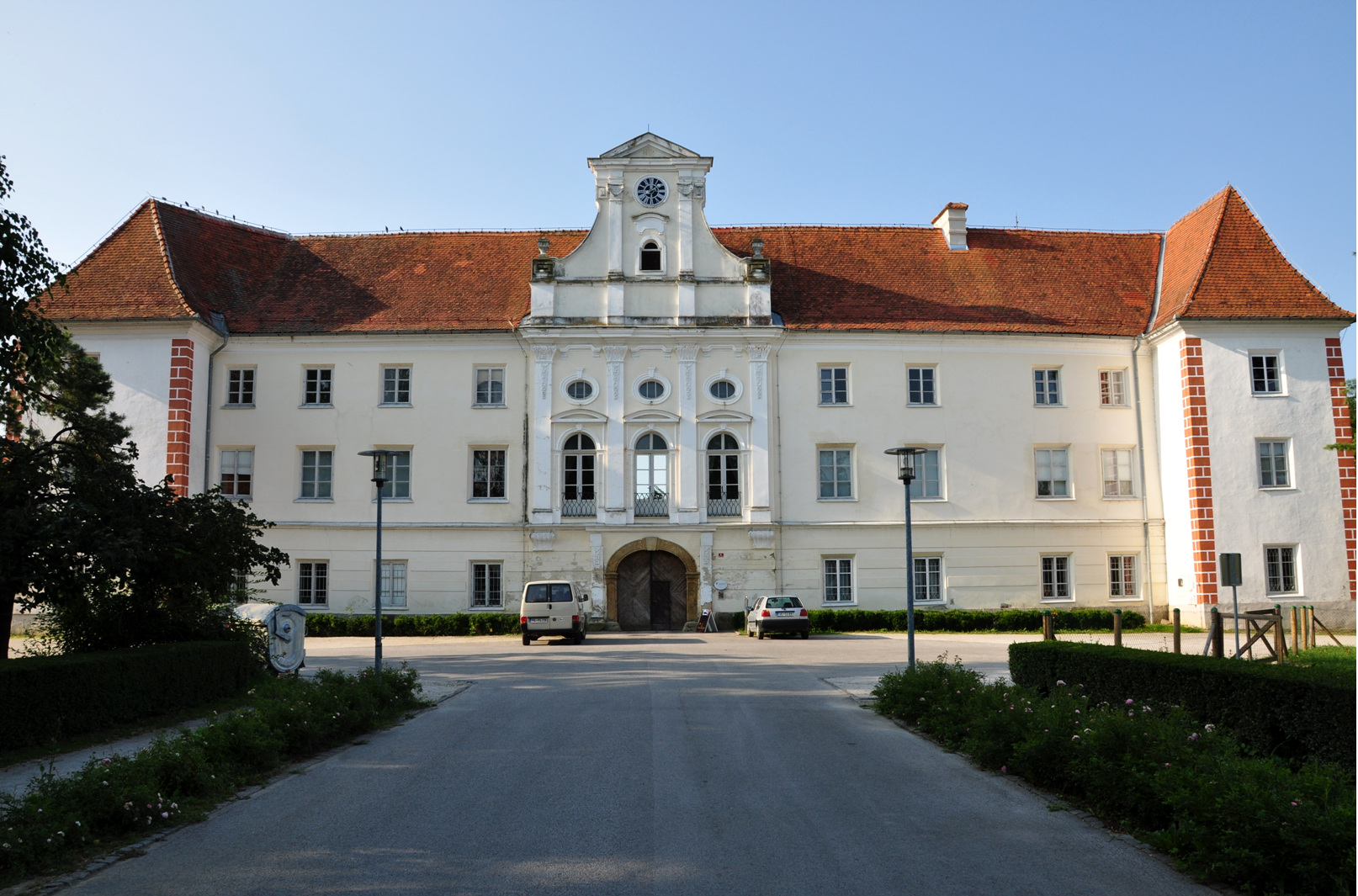
- From top, left to right: Murska Sobota's skyline, Evangelical Church complex, Tourist Information Center, Zvezda Hotel, Old pharmacy, Murska Sobota Castle

- Flag Coat of arms

- Location of Murska Sobota in Slovenia
- Coordinates: 46°40′N 16°10′E
- Country: Slovenia
- Traditional region: Prekmurje
- Statistical region: Mura
- Municipality: Murska Sobota
- First mention: 1297 (as Belmura)
- Town rights: around 1479

Government
  - Mayor: Aleksander Jevšek (SD)

Area
  - Total: 14.5 km^{2} (5.6 sq mi)
- Elevation: 190 m (620 ft)

Population (2020)
  - Total: 11,107
  - Density: 766/km^{2} (1,980/sq mi)
- Time zone: UTC+01 (CET)
  - Summer (DST): UTC+02 (CEST)
- Post code: 9000
- Area Code: 02
- Vehicle registration: MS
- Website: www.murska-sobota.si

Murska Sobota (pronounced [ˈmúːɾska ˈsóːbɔta], Slovenian abbreviation: MS [məˈsə́]; German: Olsnitz; Hungarian: Muraszombat) is a town in northeastern Slovenia. It is the centre of the Municipality of Murska Sobota near the Mura River in the region of Prekmurje and is the regional capital.

== Name ==
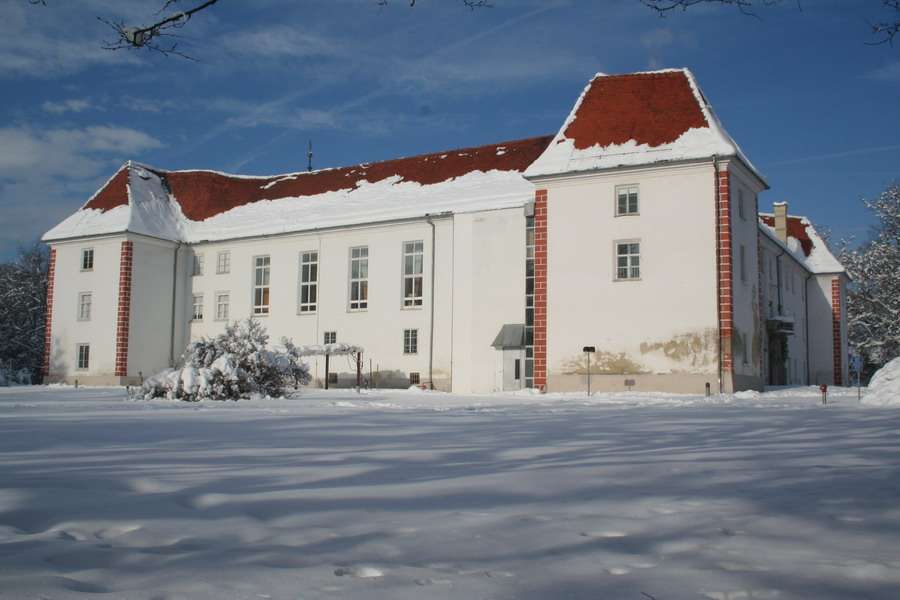
Murska Sobota Castle

Officially, the town is known as Murska Sobota, although informally it is usually simply referred to as Sobota by its inhabitants and Murska by people from other parts of Slovenia. The settlement was first attested in written documents in 1297 as Belmura (and as Murazombatha in 1348 and Murazumbota in 1366). The traditional German name of the town is Olsnitz, which is derived from the old Slovene name Olšnica. The modern Slovene name is a translation of the Hungarian name Muraszombat, which was the official name of the town until 1919. In Hungarian, szombat means 'Saturday', referring to the town's practice of holding fairs every week on that day. Murska Sobota was a district (Hungarian: járás) town of Vas County in the Kingdom of Hungary until 1918. Along with most of Prekmurje, it was annexed by Hungary during World War II, from 1941 to 1944. Between 1944 and 1945 it was under Nazi German occupation, and it was captured by Soviet troops in May 1945. It was also part of the Balatin Sanjak under Ottoman Turkey, which belonged at first to the Budin Eyalet, later the Kanije Eyaleti, before the Treaty of Karlowitz.

== History ==
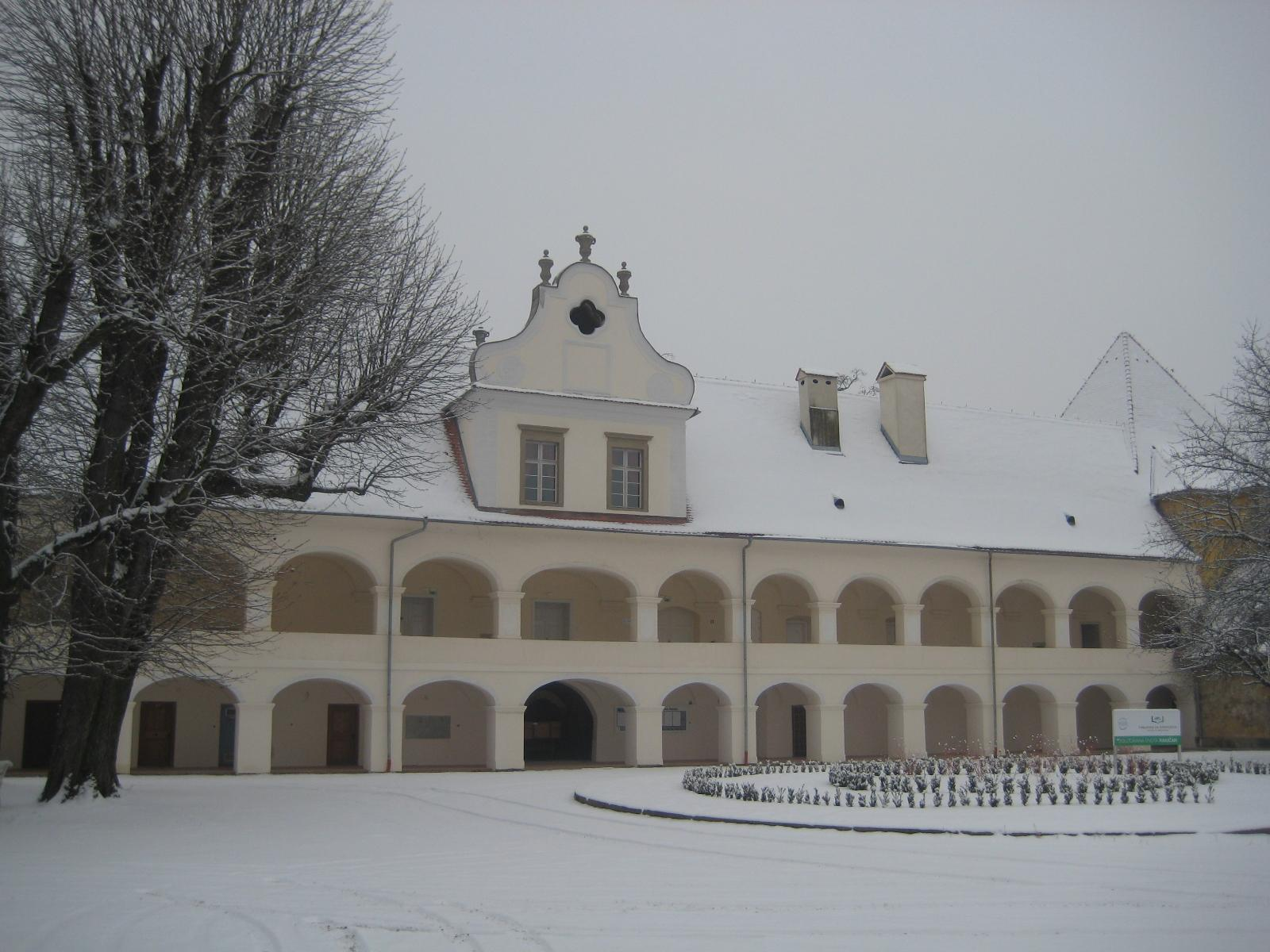
Rakičan-Batthyány Castle

Murska Sobota used to be Yugoslavia's northernmost town, and throughout history it has shifted across borders between Slovenia, Yugoslavia, and Hungary. Hungarians still represent a 3,000-person minority. In 1919, the Republic of Prekmurje was declared here and the town was the capital of the new state. In 1991, during the Ten-Day War between Slovenia and the Yugoslav Federal Army, Murska Sobota was bombed from the air, with no casualties or visible damage. Today, it is a quiet town with an economy based on regional administration, light industry, commerce, and spa tourism. In April 2006, the town became the see of the newly created Roman Catholic Diocese of Murska Sobota, which is a suffragan to the archdiocese of Maribor.

=== Jewish community of Murska Sobota ===
The once significant Jewish community of Murska Sobota was eliminated by Nazi Germany. Before World War II, a synagogue built by Lipót Baumhorn stood in Murska Sobota. It was consecrated on 31 August 1908 and demolished in 1954 by the local communist authorities after they purchased the building from a decimated Jewish community. The last rabbi in Murska Sobota was Lazar Roth. He was murdered at Auschwitz.

On 26 April 1944, all of the Jews were ordered to gather in the Murska Sobota synagogue, with hand luggage only. There, they were locked up overnight without food or water, and the next morning all the Jews of Murska Sobota were transferred to Čakovec and then to Nagykanizsa, the main concentration camp before their final destination of Auschwitz.

On 29 January 2010, the first Holocaust memorial in Slovenia was unveiled at the Murska Sobota railway station. It is dedicated to the exile of Jews from the Prekmurje region.

== Culture ==
The city appears in Aleksandar Hemon's humorous autobiographical story “Everything,” published in The New Yorker in 2005 and concerning an overly-dramatic Sarajevo teenager's mission to purchase the best chest freezer available on the former Yugoslav market. In the course of his trip, young Hemon laments,“[...] you sent me to the monstrous city, to the endless night, [...] you sent me to Murska Sobota.”

== Climate ==
Annual rainfall in Murska Sobota is among the lowest in Slovenia. Characterized by the instability of rainfall, severe droughts are frequent. It has a warm-summer humid continental climate (Dfb) that is uncommon in Slovenia except at higher elevations,

Climate data for Murska Sobota (1991–2020 normals, extremes 1950–2020)
Month	Jan	Feb	Mar	Apr	May	Jun	Jul	Aug	Sep	Oct	Nov	Dec	Year
Record high °C (°F)	18.4 (65.1)	22.2 (72.0)	25.2 (77.4)	29.7 (85.5)	33.1 (91.6)	36.3 (97.3)	39.0 (102.2)	39.7 (103.5)	33.1 (91.6)	28.1 (82.6)	24.0 (75.2)	20.1 (68.2)	39.7 (103.5)
Mean daily maximum °C (°F)	3.7 (38.7)	6.9 (44.4)	11.9 (53.4)	17.3 (63.1)	21.6 (70.9)	25.5 (77.9)	27.4 (81.3)	27.2 (81.0)	21.8 (71.2)	16.2 (61.2)	9.6 (49.3)	4.1 (39.4)	16.1 (61.0)
Daily mean °C (°F)	−0.1 (31.8)	1.7 (35.1)	6.1 (43.0)	11.1 (52.0)	15.6 (60.1)	19.3 (66.7)	20.9 (69.6)	20.3 (68.5)	15.3 (59.5)	10.4 (50.7)	5.6 (42.1)	0.6 (33.1)	10.6 (51.1)
Mean daily minimum °C (°F)	−3.7 (25.3)	−2.9 (26.8)	0.9 (33.6)	5.1 (41.2)	9.7 (49.5)	13.4 (56.1)	14.9 (58.8)	14.6 (58.3)	10.4 (50.7)	6.0 (42.8)	2.2 (36.0)	−2.6 (27.3)	5.7 (42.3)
Record low °C (°F)	−30.4 (−22.7)	−28.2 (−18.8)	−23.7 (−10.7)	−7.1 (19.2)	−4.3 (24.3)	0.5 (32.9)	3.4 (38.1)	2.7 (36.9)	−2.9 (26.8)	−8.7 (16.3)	−16.8 (1.8)	−26.8 (−16.2)	−30.4 (−22.7)
Average precipitation mm (inches)	28 (1.1)	39 (1.5)	42 (1.7)	50 (2.0)	84 (3.3)	95 (3.7)	96 (3.8)	94 (3.7)	100 (3.9)	70 (2.8)	66 (2.6)	47 (1.9)	812 (32.0)
Average extreme snow depth cm (inches)	4 (1.6)	5 (2.0)	1 (0.4)	0 (0)	0 (0)	0 (0)	0 (0)	0 (0)	0 (0)	0 (0)	1 (0.4)	3 (1.2)	1.1 (0.4)
Average precipitation days (≥ 0.1 mm)	9	8	9	11	13	13	12	11	11	10	12	10	130
Average snowy days (≥ 0 cm)	13	11	4	0	0	0	0	0	0	0	2	9	39
Average relative humidity (%) (at 14:00)	75	62	56	51	51	53	50	51	56	63	73	80	60
Mean monthly sunshine hours	72.5	108.5	153.8	197.7	244.6	257.5	276.1	262.8	182.2	133.7	71.7	56.1	2,017.2
Source 1: Slovenian Environment Agency (humidity and snow 1981–2010)
Source 2: NOAA (sun 1991–2020), Ogimet

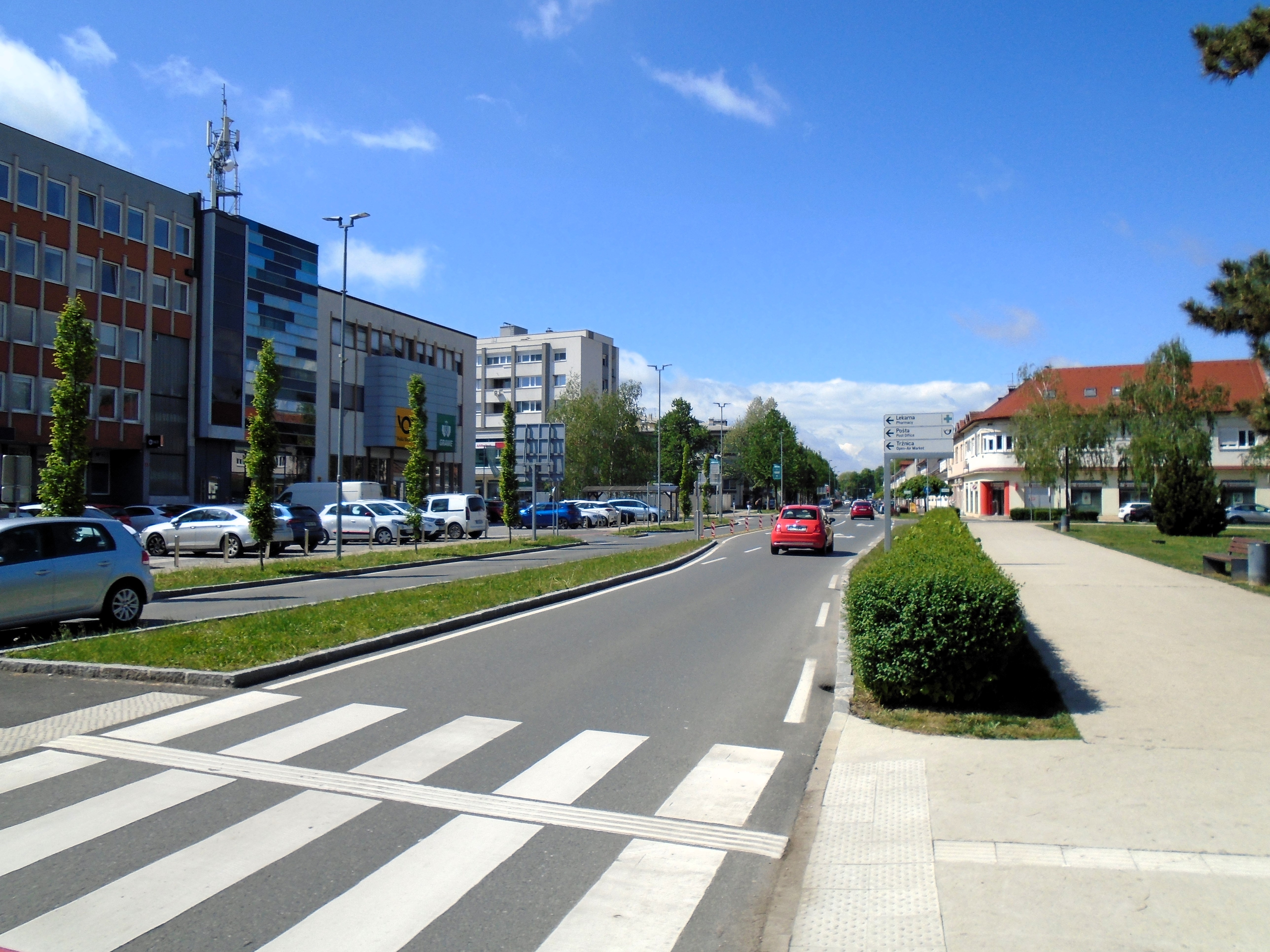
Štefan Kovač Street

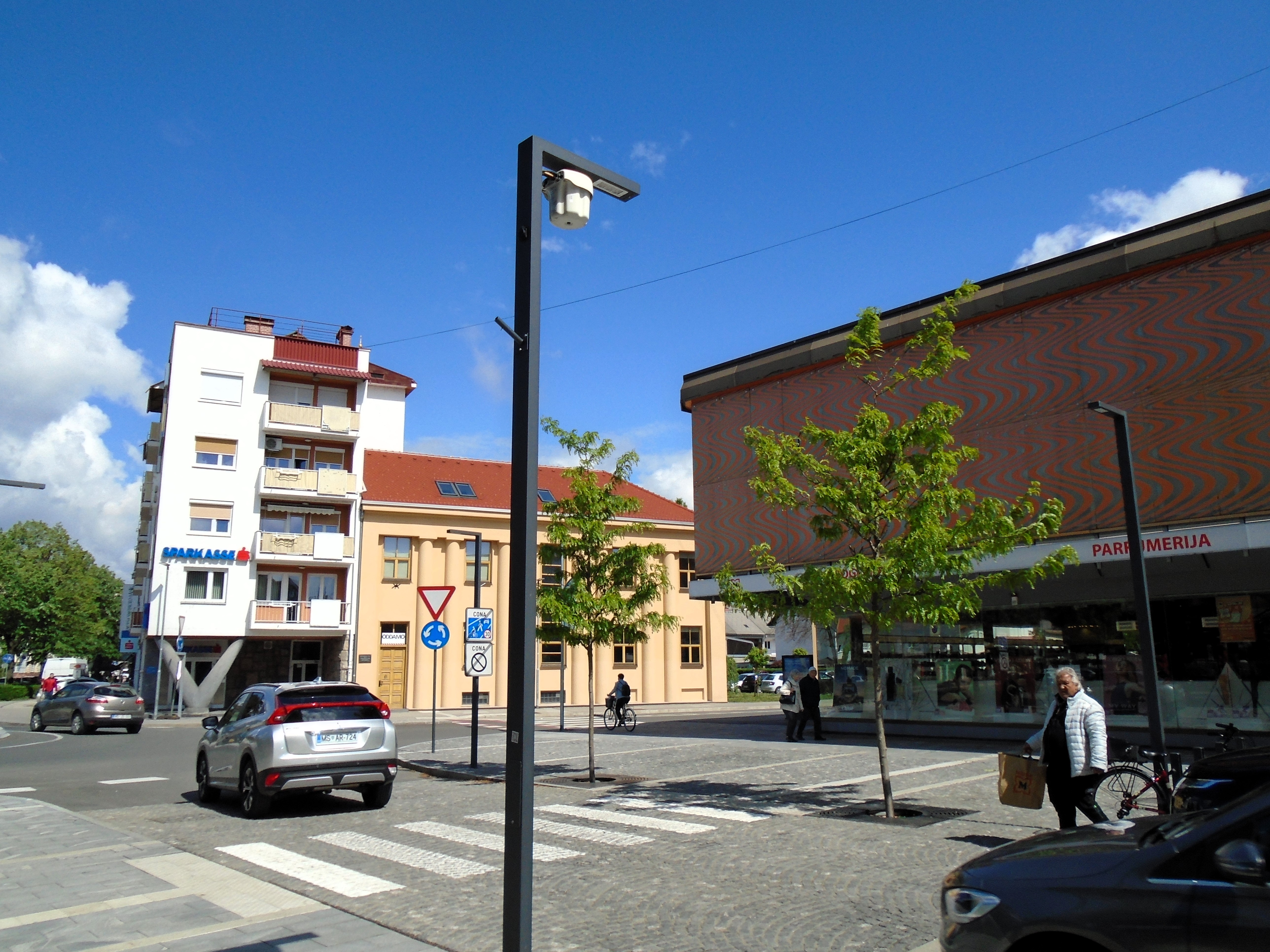
Lendavska Street

== International relations ==
=== Twin towns – Sister cities ===
Murska Sobota is twinned with:

- Firminy, France
- Ingolstadt, Germany
- Bethlehem, Pennsylvania, United States
- Paraćin, Serbia
- Körmend, Hungary
- Podstrana, Croatia
- Turnov, Czech Republic

== Notable people ==
Notable people that were born or lived in Murska Sobota include the following:

- Filip Draković (born 1991), footballer
- Erik Janža (born 1993), professional footballer that plays as left-back for Górnik Zabrze
- Miki Muster (1925–2018), sculptor, illustrator, cartoonist, and animator
- Jernej Šavel (born 1976), musician
- Luana Zajmi (born 2002), professional footballer who plays as a midfielder for Split

== See also ==
- List of cities and towns in Slovenia
- Te Mikka Festival
