= Douna Loup =

Swiss writer (born 1982)

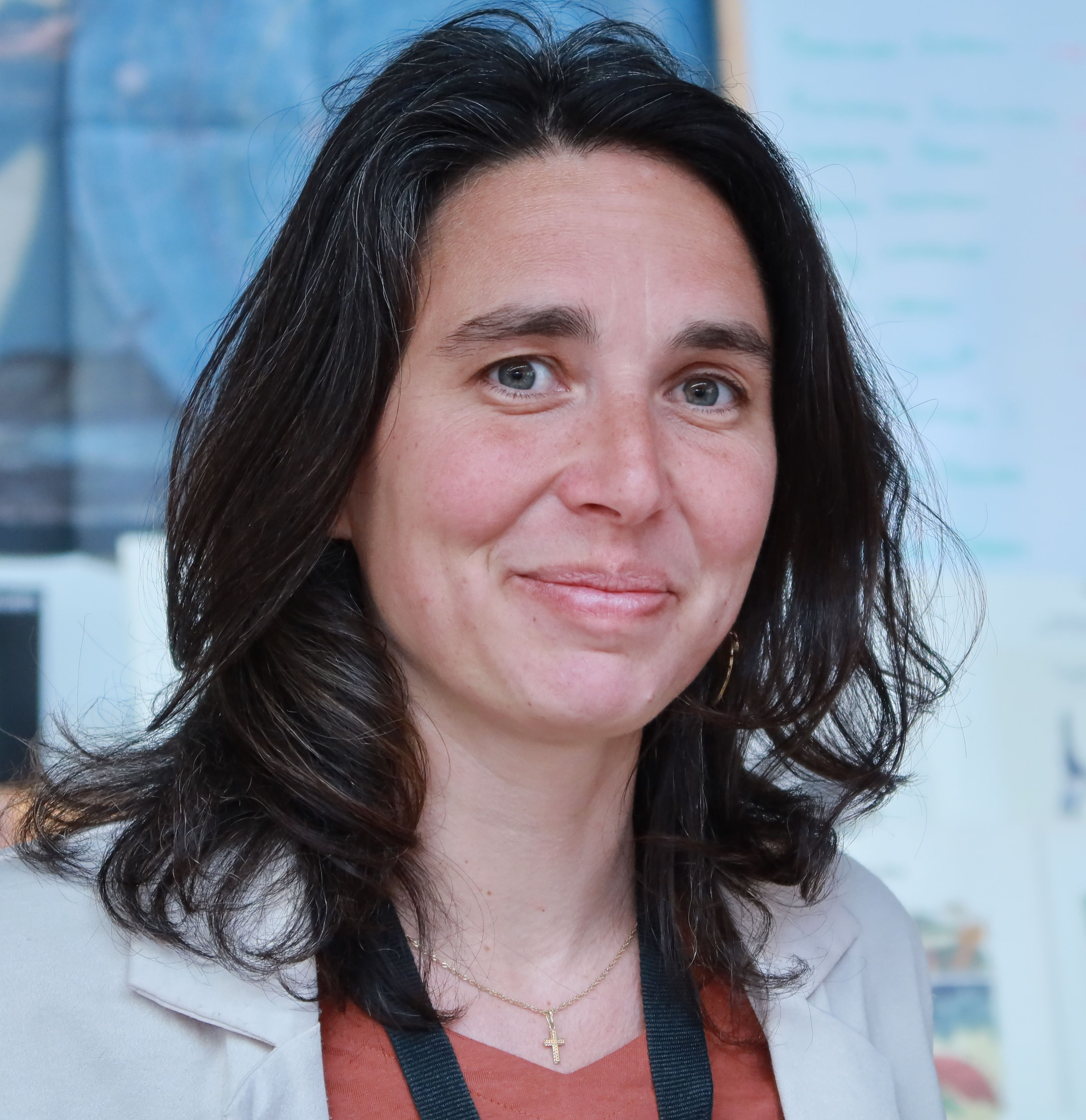
- Douna Loup
- Born: 1982 (age 43–44); Geneva, Switzerland
- Occupation: Playwright

Douna Loup (born 1982) is a Swiss writer. She published her first novel L'embrasure in 2010, which won several prizes, including the Schiller Prize. Her second novel Les lignes de ta paume was published in 2012, and was awarded the Prix des jeunes romancier du Salon du livre du Touquet. Her third novel L’Oragé; it received the Grand prix du roman métis and the jury's prize from the Salon du livre et de la presse de Genève.

== Biography ==
She was born in Geneva and grew up in the Drôme area of France. Her parents were puppeteers. Loup began writing for children's theatre. She spent six months working in an orphanage in Madagascar. In 2010, she published Mopaya, Récit d'une traversée du Congo à la Suisse based on interviews with Gabriel Nganga Nseka. Her first novel L'embrasure was published by the Mercure de France in 2010. It received the Schiller Prize Découverte, the Prix Senghor for first francophone novel, the Prix Dentan and the Prix Thyde-Monnier from the Société des gens de lettres. It was followed by a second novel Les lignes de ta paume in 2012 which was awarded the Prix des jeunes romancier du Salon du livre du Touquet. In 2015, she published L’Oragé; it received the Grand prix du roman métis and the jury's prize from the Salon du livre et de la presse de Genève.

Her play Et après le soleil se lève received the Prix de la Société Suisse des Auteurs.

In 2012, she published The lines of your palm, a novel in which she tells the story of the then eighty-five years old artist Linda Naeff, based on interviews they had together. She has published another novel in 2021, Les Printemps sauvages and also in 2021 a graphic novel with illustrator Justine Saint-Lo, L’Affaire Clitoris.
