= Isabelle Sbrissa =

Swiss writer (born 1971)

Isabelle Sbrissa (born 1971 in Geneva) is a Swiss writer and playwright, active in the field of poetry and theater. She is considered a representative of the new generation of Swiss poetry. Sbrissa was awarded a Swiss Literature Award in 2022 for her book tout tient tout.

== Biography ==
Sbrissa was born in 1971 in Geneva and currently lives in Undervelier. Sbrissa studied at the Institut Littéraire de Bienne, where she earned a Master's degree in contemporary arts practice.

After a period of time writing plays for theater, Sbrissa became interested in the vocal dimension of poetry. She experiments with different forms of performing poetry by mingling polyphony and the interference of several languages. Her poetry places importance on orality, revisiting canonical forms and translations in a creative way. She often uses translation in an unknown language, thus exploring the musicality of language and emphasizing it over the function of communication.

Her poems mix together different languages, putting forth similarities in their vocal universe, deploying open significations inclining towards a form of singing.

In 2020 she was a writer in residence at the Jan Michalski Foundation. Sbrissa is an advocate of micro-publishing, and owns a small printing house, disdill, with which she produces a magazine, La Feuille. She also founded a travelling poetry library called Le Kâdi, with Nathalie Garbely. Sbrissa won the Prix de l'écriture théâtree of the Société Suisse des Auteurs (SSA) in 2007. In 2022 Sbrissa won a Swiss Literature Award for her book tout tient tout.

== Publications ==
- La Traversée du désert,(Éditions Bernard Campiche 2009)
- Le Quatre-Mains (Éditions Bernard Campiche, 2009)
- Travaux d’Italie (dans Grumeaux, Violence, n° 3, 2012, Éditions NOUS, 2012)
- poèmes poèmes1 (éditions disdill, 2013)
- R (éditions disdill, 2013)
- Mot a mort (KIN issue 3 2013.01)

== Online publications ==
- sonnetsTM, 2015 sur sitaudis.fr
- Noëlle Revaz, Escales & Isabelle Sbrissa, intimités, amuse-bouche et cycles littérature de partout
- Baccalà alla ligure / Baquelle à la dure, revue coaltar?
- Langue morte (audio)
- Ceylor (audio)
- Transformation de la vie antérieure d'Oscar Pastor
