= Nowhere Man (Hemon novel) =

1964 novel by Aleksandar Hemon

Nowhere Man (The Pronek Fantasies)
- First edition cover design
- Author: Aleksandar Hemon
- Language: English
- Genre: Novel
- Publisher: Nan A. Talese
- Publication date: 17 September 2002
- Publication place: United States
- Media type: Print (hardcover)
- Pages: 242 pp
- ISBN: 978-0-385-49924-8
- OCLC: 49531508

Nowhere Man is a 2002 novel by Aleksandar Hemon named after the Beatles song "Nowhere Man". The novel (subtitled The Pronek Fantasies) centers around the character of Jozef Pronek, a Bosnian refugee, who was already the subject of Hemon's novella Blind Jozef Pronek & Dead Souls published in his short story collection The Question of Bruno (2000).

The novel comprises a series of vignettes telling the story of a character named Jozef Pronek, a Ukrainian born and raised in Bosnia. Pronek's biography is related by multiple narrators. The book can be divided into three sections. The first section describes Pronek's peaceful childhood in 1980s Sarajevo. The second section follows Pronek as he is a university student in Kiev in the Soviet Union at the time of the 1991 political turmoil (narrated by his dormitory roommate Victor Plavchuk). In the third part of the book Pronek is an immigrant in Chicago, where he works in a series of low-paid jobs including working as a Greenpeace canvasser, which enables him to observe the lives of middle-class Chicagoans. Some of these elements are reflective of the author's own life.

The novel's final chapter, spanning the years 1900 to 2000, is a departure from Pronek's adventures and recounts the story of a Russian White Army officer and his adventures in Harbin and Shanghai.
