= The Book of My Lives =

2013 nonfiction book by Aleksandar Hemon

- First edition
- Author: Aleksandar Hemon
- Language: English
- Genre: Nonfiction
- Publisher: Farrar, Straus and Giroux
- Publication date: 19 March 2013
- Publication place: United States
- Media type: Print (hardcover)
- Pages: 224 pp
- ISBN: 978-0-374-11573-9

The Book of My Lives is the first book of nonfiction by the Bosnian-American novelist Aleksandar Hemon. It's a collection of nonfiction pieces about Hemon's childhood in Sarajevo and his adult life in Chicago. The final essay tells of his young daughter's brain tumor and untimely death; it was first published in The New Yorker under the title "The Aquarium."

Hemon’s The Book of My Lives was shortlisted for the National Book Critics Circle Award in 2013.
