= Philippe Rahmy =

Swiss poet and writer

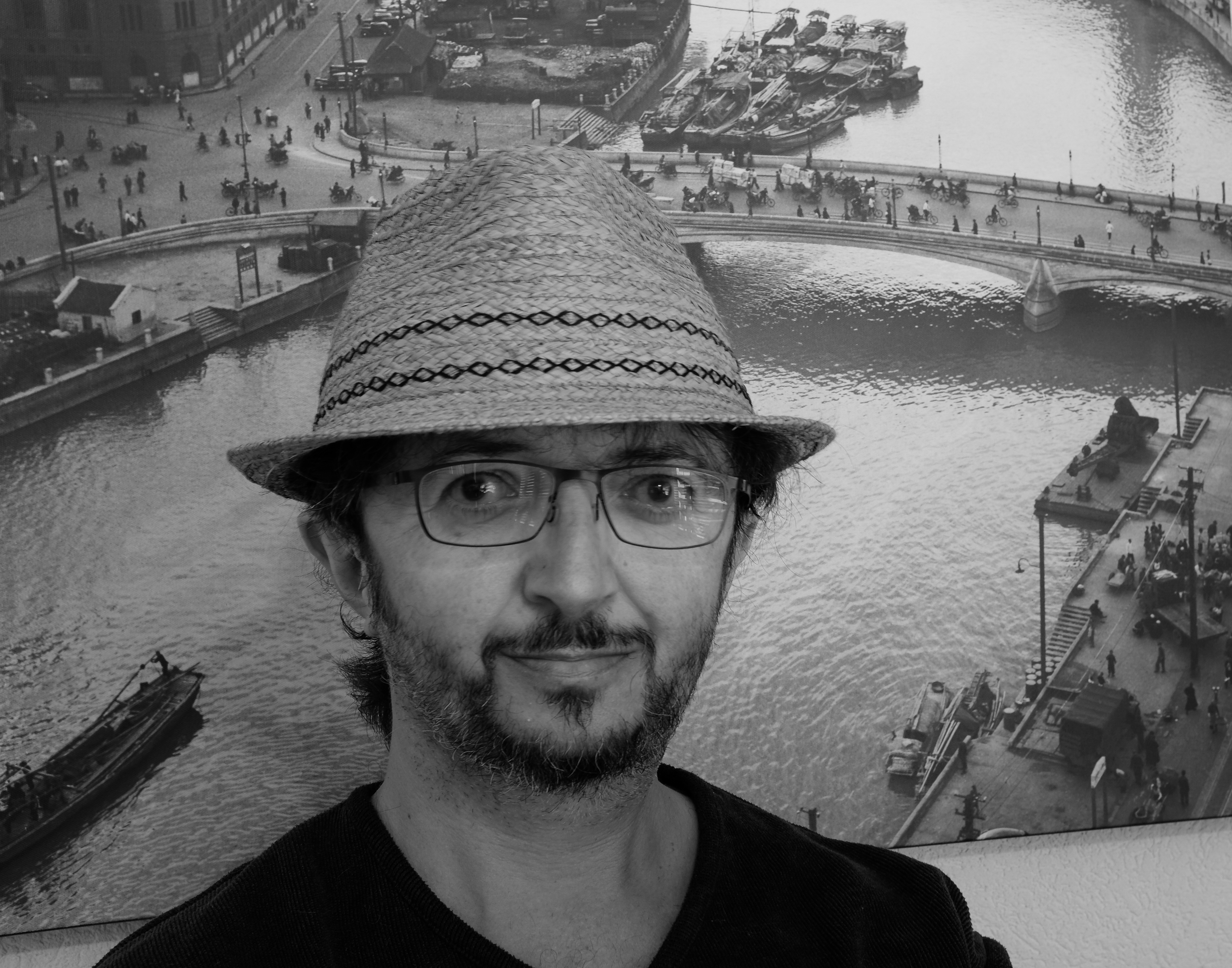
- Rahmy, 2015
- Born: 5 June 1965
- Died: 1 October 2017 (aged 52)
- Occupations: Poet, writer
- Website: www.rahmyfiction.net

Philippe Rahmy (5 June 1965, in Geneva – 1 October 2017) was a Swiss poet and writer. Rahmy published several collections of poetry and four novels. Rahmy was also a photographer, short film director, songwriter and also a founding member of the literary site remue.net. Rahmy won numerous awards for his novels Béton armé (Reinforced Concrete) and Allegra. Born with brittle bone disease, he was also an active disability activist.

== Early life and education ==
Rahmy was born in Geneva in 1965. He was of Egyptian descent on his father's side. He suffered from brittle bone disease and spent much of his childhood in and out of hospital. He attended a Catholic boarding school in Geneva and then studied the history of art and Egyptology at the École du Louvre in Paris before graduating from the University of Lausanne in literature and philosophy.

== Career ==
Rahmy published several collections of poetry before attending a writer's residency in Shanghai. This was followed by his first novel Reinforced Concrete, inspired by his time in Shanghai, a second novel, Allegra, set in London before the Olympic Games, a third novel, Monarchs, published in August 2017. Rahmy was working on his fourth novel, Pardon for America, about prisoners who have been wrongfully convicted when he died. His books have been published in France, USA, Italy, Switzerland and China.

Rahmy was also a founding member of the prominent French literary site remue.net, focused on promoting contemporary literature over the internet and through live events. Philippe Rahmy was also active as a photographer and a director of independent short films. He also wrote songs for the rock band I Need My Gasoline.

Before his death, he had been working on a literary and multimedia project about abandoned cities The collaborative writing project was to be hosted on D-FICTION before finding a dedicated open website platform gathering a range of tools for geolocation, virtual exploration of the landscape, artistic creation, and communication. The project was later to be expanded to visual arts, music, staged arts and street arts, as well as academic productions.

At the time of his death, Rahmy had been working on a fourth novel, Pardon pour l'Amérique (Pardon for America), about prisoners who have been wrongfully convicted. A previously unpublished essay by Rahmy, titled "Prepositions Démocratiques" (Democratic Propositions), was published shortly after his death.

== Awards ==
Philippe Rahmy was the recipient of multiple literary honours, among them the 2016 Rambert Prize for his second novel, Allegra and the 2017 Swiss Literature Prize.

== Personal life ==
Philippe Rahmy met his wife Tanja while they were both in graduate school at the University of Lausanne. The couple were married for 18 years.

Suffering from osteogenesis imperfecta himself, Rahmy was an active member of several disability-related associations.

== Death ==
Rahmy died on Sunday 1 October 2017. At the time of his death, he had been an authors in residence at the Maison de l'écriture in Montricher.

== Books ==
- 2017 : Monarques, éditions de La Table Ronde, coll. Vermillon
- 2016 : Allegra, éditions de La Table Ronde, coll. Vermillon, January 2016 (awarded the Prix Rambert 2016 and the Swiss Literature Award 2017)
- 2015 : Béton armé, Collection Folio (n° 5946), Gallimard, 2015
- 2014 : Loop Road, nerval.fr, March 2014
- 2013 : Béton armé – Shanghai au corps à corps, Éditions de La Table Ronde Editions Table Ronde - Littérature française et étrangère, essais et documents, beaux livres, La Petite Vermillon, preface Jean-Christophe Rufin de l'Académie française, September 2013 (awarded the Prix Wepler 2013 Mention spéciale du jury // One of the 20 best books of the year 2013, palmarès Lire; Prix Michel-Dentan 2014)
- 2013 : Corps au miroir, avec Sabine Oppliger, Encre et lumière, 2013
- 2010 : Cheyne, 30 ans, 30 voix, Livres hors collection, 2010
- 2009 : Cellules souches, avec Stéphane Dussel, Mots tessons, 2009
- 2009 : Movimento dalla fine, a cura di Monica Pavani, Mobydick, 2009
- 2008 : SMS de la cloison, publie.net, 2008
- 2008 : Architecture nuit, texte expérimental, publie.net, 2008
- 2007 : Demeure le corps, Chant d'exécration, Cheyne Editeur, 2007
- 2005 : Mouvement par la fin, Un portrait de la douleur, Cheyne Editeur, 2005 (postface Jacques Dupin, Prix des Charmettes – Jean-Jacques Rousseau 2006)

== Articles ==
- La couleur des jours, "Pardon pour l'Amérique", 31-08-2017, extract of an ongoing novel, written at the foundation Jan Michalski
- Specimen, The Babel Revue of Translation, "Pardon pour l'Amérique", fr/eng, transl. by Carla Calimani, 06-2017
- Viceversa littérature, nr. 11, "Dialogue avec Philippe Rahmy : l'écriture en acte" by Marina Skalova, followed by "retour architecture nuit" by François Bon, 04-2017
- Diacritik, "Le roi est vulnérable", 24-02-2017
- Château de Lavigny, 20 ans, anthologie anniversaire, "Le Châtiment", 08-2016
- Página/12, "Todos tenemos alguna discapacidad", 19-04-2016
- La moitié du fourbi, Nr. 3, "Un portrait du Fayoum", 03-2016
- Le Persil, Special edition dedicated to poetry in the francophone part of Switzerland, "Comme le caméléon, sa langue", 03-2016
- Postface to the book "Kvar lo" from Sabine Huynh (poems, with ink paintings from Caroline François-Rubino), Éditions Æncrages & Co, coll. Écri(peind)re, 2016
- Le Magazine Littéraire, Nr. 541, 03–2014, "Alors, Shanghai?"
- Le Magazine Littéraire, Nr. 532, 06–2013, "Paul Auster, le grand entretien"
- D-Fiction, 05–2013, "Aran"
- Art+Politique, 2012, "Du partage des richesses"
- Lieux d'Être, N°51, printemps 2011, "Il ne suffit pas de bégayer"
- Viceversa Littérature, N°5 (2011), "Château Solitude"
- La Revue de Belles-Lettres, 134e année, numéro 1–2 2010, "Un terrain parmi d'autres"
- Antilipseis Magazine, mars 2011, in: "Perceptions"
- The Black Herald Press, 1st issue, January 2011, (Note: Archived at Ghostarchive and the Wayback Machine: ΑΝΤΙΛΗΨΕΙΣ - PERCEPTIONS. YouTube.)
- revue China Dolls, Beijing, été 2010, "The Glory of the body",
- revue Hétérographe N°4, automne 2010, Sandra Moussempès, Photogénie des ombres peintes
- revue fario, May/June 2009, " La vie sauve "
- revue Faire Part, " Caroline Sagot Duvauroux, Vol-ce-l'est, l'autre chose ", avril 2009
- participation au catalogue d'exposition du peintre Winfried Veit, avril 2009
- revue Viola, " Solitudine publica ", mars 2009
- revue Hétérographe, " Solitude publique ", mars 2009
- revue Action restreinte, " Kit & Scat Song ", février 2009
- François Bon, " Tu marchais dans la maison des morts, vidéo ", dans : " François Bon, éclats de réalité ", Dominique Viart et Jean-Bernard Vray (eds), PU de Saint Etienne 2008
- Joë Bousquet, " Mystique ", dans : Joë Bousquet, " Maigre nudité du soir ", éditions de l'Atelier du Gué 2008
- revue Lieux d'Être N° 45, " Naître détruit ", 2007
- revue Faire Part N° 20–21, " Coudrier, une gravure à la Manière noire ", dans : " Matière d'Origine : Jacques Dupin ", 2007
- Aral, dans : " Jean-Marie Barnaud, Pour saluer la bienvenue ", Bibliothèque municipale de Charleville-Mézières 2002

== Short movies ==
Phil Rahmy displayed his vision as a director and award-winning independent short film producer through his later productions which were being distributed and viewed globally. Later viewings

- Uplink Factory, video festival, official selection of Swiss short films (OBLO), "The Body remains", Tokyo, Japan, 2011.
- Gallery Arts-en-l'Ile, projection of "M.R.I. ", curator Penelope Petsini, Geneva, Switzerland, 2010
- Special Prize of the Jury at the Oblò Underground Short Film Festival, "The Body remains", Lausanne, Switzerland, 2009
- Museum of Modern Arts (MAMCO), projection of "M.R.I"., Geneva, Switzerland, 2009
- Festival Côté Court 2008, official selection of "The Body remains", Cinéma 104, Pantin, France, 2008.
- Un festival c'est trop court, programm FILMS D'ICI, official selection, "The Body remains", Nice, France, 2008.
- Official Selection for exhibition in the New York International Independent Film & Video Festival, "The Body remains", New York February, Manhattan, NYC, 2008.

== Photography ==
His photographic work concentrated on the human body and the topic of so-called "normality".

Later expos

- Photovision 2011, exposition of the series "The Glory of the Body", in collaboration with Antilipseis Magazine of Photography. At the end of 2011, the expo will be part of the Athens School of Fine Arts fund, Athens, Greece, 2011.
- China Dolls Magazine, "Body & Norm", Beijing, China, 2010.
- Special Prize of the Jury at the Oblò Underground Short Film Festival, "The Body remains", Lausanne, Switzerland, 2009
- Universal Exposition of Shanghai, "Immobility and Movement", FFA Pavilion, Shanghai, China, 2010
- Revue d'Ici Là, Online Art Magazine, France, 2010.
- Un festival c'est trop court, programm FILMS D'ICI, official selection, "The Body remains", Nice, France, 2008.

== Screenwriting ==
Phil Rahmy was active as a screenwriter, and has co-founded Wallman Productions, a Hollywood-based independent film and music production company, in association with the famous jazzman Art Johnson.

== Distinctions / Grants ==
- 2006 : Prix des Charmettes/Jean-Jacques Rousseau for "Mouvement par la fin" (Cheyne Editeur, 2005)
- 2010 : Lauréat de la bourse d'écriture Pro Helvetia
- 2010 : Finaliste Prix FEMS pour la littérature
- 2011 : Writer-in-residence, Shanghai Writers Association
- 2013 : Prix Wepler Fondation La Poste 2013 Mention spéciale du jury for Béton armé (Éditions La Table Ronde, 2013)
- 2014 : Meilleur récit de voyage - Sélection Lire for Béton armé (Éditions La Table Ronde, 2013)
- 2014 : Prix Pittard de l'Andelyn for Béton armé (Éditions La Table Ronde, 2013)
- 2014 : Prix Dentan for Béton armé (Éditions La Table Ronde, 2013)
- 2015 : Writer-in-residence, Château de Lavigny
- 2016 : Writer-in-residence, Escuela de Otoño de Traducción Literaria en Lenguas Vivas, Buenos Aires (Note: Escuela de Otoño de Traducción Literaria 2016 http://ieslvf.caba.infd.edu.ar/sitio/index.cgi?wid_seccion=37)
- 2016 : Prix Eugène-Rambert for Allegra (Éditions La Table Ronde, 2016)
- 2017 : Swiss Literature Awards for Allegra (Éditions La Table Ronde, 2016) (Note: Swiss Office for Culture 2017 http://www.prixlitterature.ch/fr/prix-suisses-litterature-2017/philippe-rahmy/)
- 2017 : Writer-in-residence, Fondation Jan Michalski pour l'écriture et la littérature, Montricher, Switzerland (Note: Fontation Jan Michalski pour l'écriture et la littérature, http://www.fondation-janmichalski.com/residence-pour-ecrivains/residents-2017/)

== Bibliography ==
- Bibliothèque cantonale universitaire
- articles by Philippe Rahmy on remue.net
- texts by Philippe Rahmy on remue.net
- poetry books edited by Cheyne Editeur
- rahmyfiction.net Philippe Rahmy's blog

== See also ==
Lepori, Lou. 2023. Philippe Rahmy, le voyageur de cristal / Philippe Rahmy, the Crystal Traveler. Lausanne: Éditions Double ligne, March 9.
