= Rebecca Gisler =

Swiss writer

Rebecca Gisler (born 1991) is a Swiss author and translator. Her first novel, D'oncle, was published in French and translated into German by Gisler. It won the Swiss Literature Prize in 2022. An English translation was published in 2024.

== Life and work ==
Gisler was born in Zürich and studied at the Swiss Literature Institute in Biel and at the University of Paris 8, where she earned a Master's degree in creative writing. A multilingual author, she writes both prose and poetry. Although she grew up in Zurich, Gisler usually writes in French, which she describes as her mother tongue, as her family only spoke French at home. She also initially wrote her debut novel D'oncle in French. While she was still working on the first draft, she first translated a passage and then the entire novel into German herself. The translation work sometimes felt like she was writing the text a second time, she says.

== D'oncle / From Uncle ==
Gisler's debut novel is about an uncle, his house in Brittany, and the visit of his niece and nephew. The novel is told from the niece's perspective; she observes the uncle and circles around him, describing his character and actions and exploring his idiosyncrasies.

The book has been widely praised in the press. Reviewer Roman Bucheli wrote in the NZZ that the bizarre stories in Gisler's debut novel seem to conceal a trauma. "Only gradually does one realize that a second melody resonates in the hilarity, albeit in a minor key, and that every room in this uncle's house has a false floor."

D'oncle was extensively reviewed in the francophone media, from Libération to Le Temps. It was also nominated for several literary prizes, and in 2022 won the Swiss Literature Prize awarded by the Federal Office of Culture.

D'oncle was published in English translation as About Uncle by Peirene Press in 2024, translated from the French by Jordan Stump.
