= Ivan Farron =

Swiss French speaking writer from Vaud

Ivan Farron (born 17 November 1971, Basel) is a Swiss French speaking writer from Vaud.

== Biography ==
Born in Tavannes, Ivan Farron is a graduate of the business school of Lausanne. He then attended the evening gymnasium to enter the Faculty of Arts of the University of Lausanne. After obtaining his bachelor's degree, he worked as an assistant to the chair of French literature at the University of Zurich, where he obtained a doctorate.

He was revealed by his first narration crowned by the Prix Dentan in 1996, Un après-midi avec Wackernagel, in which a young man awaits with anguish a childhood friend who has just spent six months in a psychiatric asylum and wonders about the changes that have taken place during this long absence.

Ivan Farron is a member of the Autrices et auteurs de Suisse association.

== Publications ==
- 1995: Un après-midi avec Wackernagel, Éditions Zoé, Prix Dentan 1996
- 2004: Pierre Michon. La grâce par les œuvres, Éditions Zoé, ISBN 9782881825163
- 2005: Panégyrique de Bertram Rothe, in "La collection de Bertram Rothe", Lausanne, art&fiction, ISBN 2-9700398-6-9
- 2006: Les déménagements inopportuns, Éditions Zoé, Prix Fénéon 2006 ISBN 9782881825453
- 2010: Allégories, in "Mode de vie", art&fiction, ISBN 978-2-940377-36-7
- 2011: L'appétit limousin. Quelques réflexions sur Les Onze de Pierre Michon, Éditions Verdier, ISBN 9782864326427

== Sources ==
- Anne-Lise Delacrétaz, Daniel Maggetti, Écrivaines et écrivains d'aujourd'hui, 2002, p. 281-282
- Roger Francillon, Histoire de la littérature de Suisse romande, vol. 4, p. 441
- Hebdo n° 4, 2001
- Jean Kaempfer, Le Temps, 2006/02/04
