= Sozialhelden =

Nonprofit Organisation

SOZIALHELDEN e.V.
- Founded: 2004
- Founder: Raul Krauthausen, Jan Mörsch
- Location(s): Berlin; Germany
- Origins: Germany
- Region served: worldwide
- Website: http://www.sozialhelden.de/en/

Sozialhelden e.V. is a registered nonprofit organisation based in Berlin, Germany. Its projects engage people in activities promoting social justice. The organisation is funded primarily through donations and grants and has been awarded multiple national and international prizes for its projects.

== Goals ==
The organisation's aim is to make socially conscious engagement attractive and visible to a broad public. It strives to raise awareness for social issues, get people engaged in social activism and provide solutions which do not instill pity.

== Projects ==
The project Pfandtastisch helfen makes it possible for customers to donate their bottle recycling receipts at supermarkets. The funds raised from the receipts are donated to other nonprofit organisations throughout Germany. The food bank in Berlin, Berliner Tafel, for instance, was able to raise more than 100,000 euros per year in this way. The project Wheelmap.org is an online map for finding and marking wheelchair accessible places. Users can mark public places such as cafés, cinemas, stores and doctor's offices using a simple traffic light system, which indicates if a place is fully, partially or not at all wheelchair accessible. The project gained national fame because of a Google Chrome TV advertisement featuring the map and its founder, Raul Krauthausen. The map is available in 22 languages on the website and as an iOS, Android (operating system) and Windows Phone app.

In May 2012 Sozialhelden introduced the project BrokenLifts.org. The project's aim is to create a central platform where users can inform themselves about the state of repair of elevators in public transportation systems. Starting in November 2011 information regarding malfunctioning elevators in the two transportation systems in Berlin was collected and analyzed hourly. On October 8, 2014, a revised version of the service was launched in cooperation with the public transportation providers Verkehrsverbund Berlin-Brandenburg, the S-Bahn Berlin GmbH and the Berliner Verkehrsbetriebe. Elevators in the system report their operational state to BrokenLifts.org and the malfunctioning elevators are shown on the website and app of the service. In addition, the broken elevators are also shown on the online schedule of the transportation providers. Currently the project is limited to the Berlin region, but a collection of data nationwide is envisioned. On August 16, 2012, the organisation published the project Leidmedien.de in cooperation with the Robert Bosch Stiftung. The project, which was developed together with several journalists, is directed at reporters and commentators who work for the press, in radio broadcasting or other media. It gives directions and support on what phrases and expressions to employ when writing about people with disabilities, without stigmatising them. The aim of the site is to raise the public's awareness by making journalists consider the way language shapes our realities and thus has the power to represent people with disabilities in a realistic way, devoid of stereotypes. The project also gives a voice to people with a wide spectrum of disabilities, giving them a platform for perspectives that are rarely heard in the mainstream media. Sozialhelden emphasize that Leidmedien is not there to instruct journalists but rather to sensitise and change perspectives and give support in finding appropriate language.

== Awards ==
- In 2014 the project Wheelmap.org was awarded the Smart Hero Award (awarded in cooperation with Facebook and the Stiftung Digitale Chancen ) in the category voluntary commitment.
- In 2013 Wheelmap.org was awarded the Zedler-Prize (awarded by Wikimedia Germany) for free knowledge in the category External Knowledge Project of the year.
- In 2013 co-founder Raul Krauthausen was given the Federal Cross of Merit by Ursula von der Leyen, Federal Minister for Labour and Social Affairs, to honour his engagement with Sozialhelden.
- In 2012 Wheelmap.org won the World Summit Award in the category Inclusion & Empowerment.
- In 2012 Sozialhelden received the prize Deutscher Verzeichnismedien Preis 2012 for their project Wheelmap.org. The prize was awarded by Verband Deutscher Auskunfts- und Verzeichnismedien e.V.
- In 2011 Sozialhelden received the Vodafone Smart Accessibility Award 2011 for their project Wheelmap.org.
- In 2011 Sozialhelden received the award Ausgewählter Ort 2011 in the initiative "Germany – Land of Ideas", whose patron is the Federal President of Germany.
- In 2012 the organisation was awarded the INCA-Award (bronze) for its app Wheelmap.
- In 2010 Sozialhelden's project Wheelmap.org was awarded the VZ Award (audience prize of the German Citizens Award).
- In 2009 Sozialhelden received the Audience Prize of the German Engagement Award. [21] They were also given the special award of the KarmaKonsum Founder Award for their project Pfandtastisch Helfen.
- In 2008 Sozialhelden's project Pfandtastisch Helfen was elected one of eight "Bundessieger" projects by startsocial, a contest that supports social ideas and projects.
