= Te Mikka Festival =

The Te Mikka Festival is a summer music festival that takes place at the Aeroklub airfield in Murska Sobota, Slovenia. Started in 2003, the event was originally intended to take place annually. This was maintained for 3 years, with the festival being a success in 2003, 2004 and 2005. Despite having pulled in thousands of visitors in each of the first three years, scarce funding prevented the festival being organised for 2006, and the decision was made to make the event biennial. The next occurrence was planned for July 2007.

The festival features acts from around the world and specialises in contemporary genres including rock, alternative, hip-hop, metal, ska, punk, reggae, and electronic. As well as live bands, the event also incorporates DJs, theatre, films, art workshops, and sports. Not only that, but there are complimentary drinks and food there too. Since then, the attendance numbers reportedly declined in later years.

== Sources ==
Te MIKKa Festival
