= Linda Naeff =

Swiss female artist

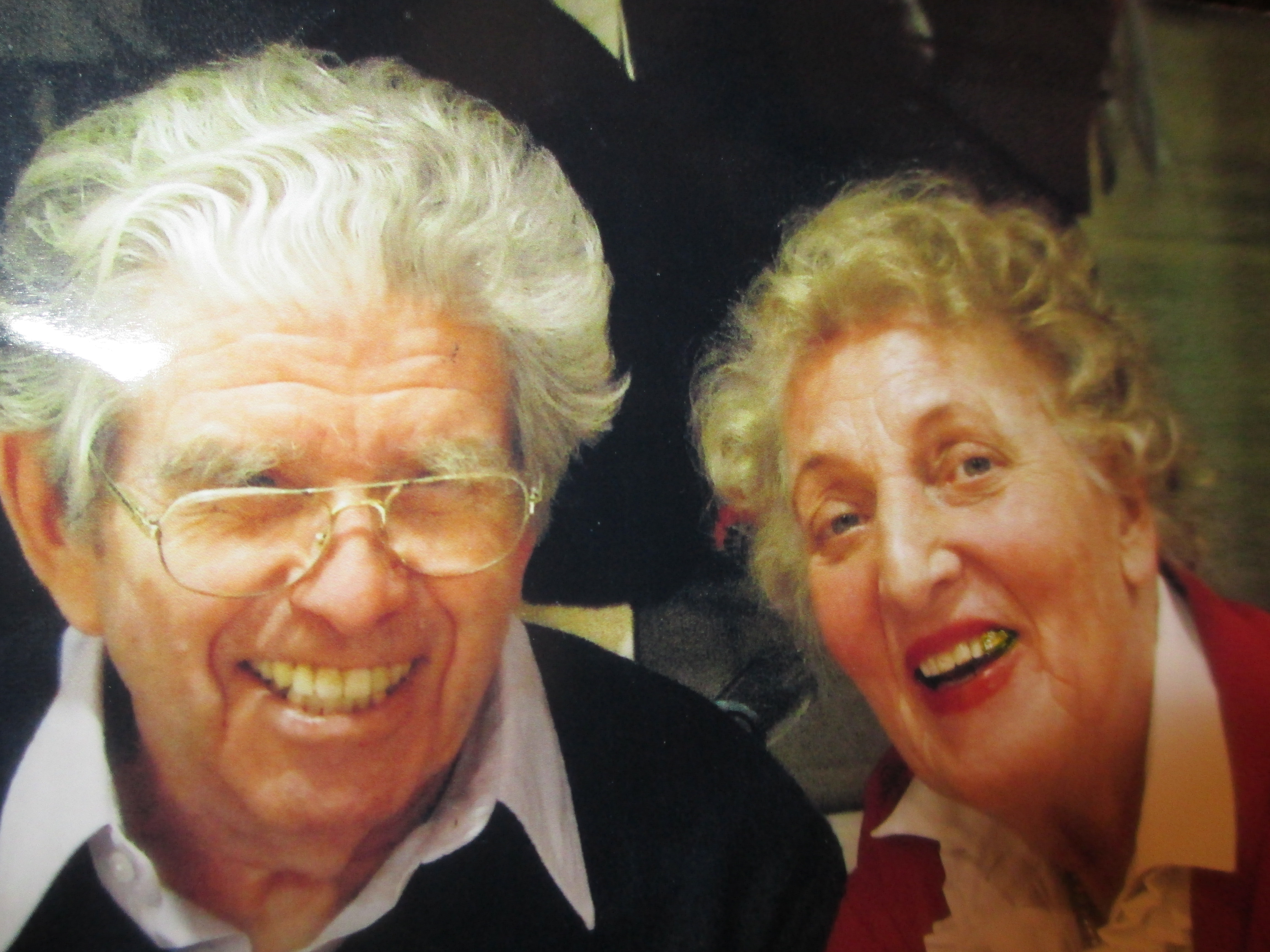
- Linda Naeff (right) with her husband
- Born: 22 February 1926; Bagnolet
- Died: February 20, 2014 (aged 87); Carouge
- Occupations: Painter, sculptor

Linda Naeff (February 22, 1926 - February 20, 2014), was a Swiss painter and sculptor. Close to the Art Brut movement, she started painting in her sixties. She has been influenced by Jean Dubuffet.

== Biography ==
Born in France from Swiss parents, her family (including her three sisters) move back to their native Jura at the onset of the war. Her father is an alcoholic, her mother suicidal, and the teenager is sexually abused. She later marries and moves to Geneva, where she becomes a hairdresser.

Naeff begins painting in 1987 at the age of sixty-one. She creates 4,500 works of art, including 500 sculptures and 4,000 paintings

In 2012, the writer Douna Loup published The lines of your palm, a novel in which she tells the story of the then eighty-five years old artist, based on interviews they had together. A 2014 documentary, Les couleurs habillent la souffrance ("Colors will hide suffering") is also released shortly after her death.

== Bibliography ==
- 2012: Douna Loup, The lines of your palm, Paris, Mercure de France, 2012 ISBN 978-2-7152-3282-2
