= Wheelmap.org =

Worldwide map of wheelchair accessible places

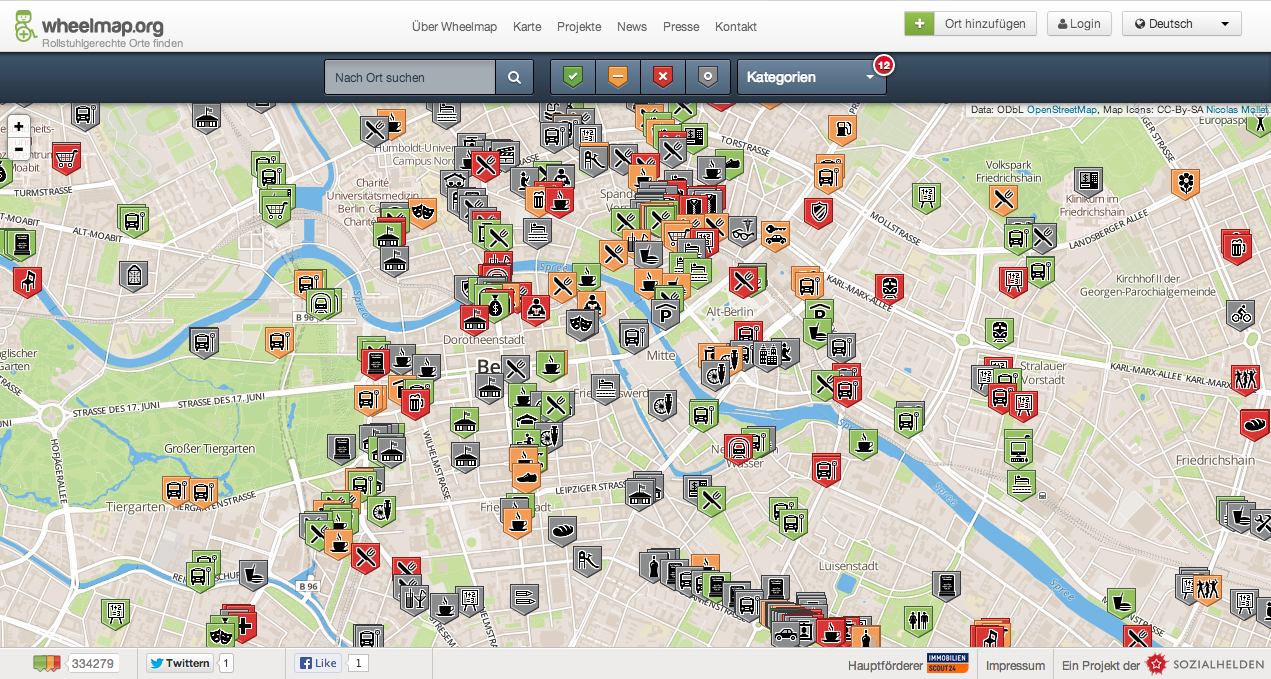
- Website type: Web mapping
- Available in: 22 languages
- Owner: Sozialhelden e.V.
- Creator: Christoph Bünte
- Website: www.wheelmap.org
- Commercial: No
- Registration: No, only to add special comments
- Launched: 9 July 2010; 16 years ago
- Current status: Online
- Content license: CC BY-SA 2.0, CC BY 3.0

Wheelmap.org is an online, worldwide map for finding and marking wheelchair accessible places, developed by the German nonprofit organisation Sozialhelden e.V. Anyone can find and add public places to the map and rate them according to a simple traffic light system. The map, which is based on OpenStreetMap, was created in 2010 by a team around social entrepreneur Raul Krauthausen to help people who use wheelchairs or wheeled walkers to plan their days more easily. Parents pushing a baby carriage can also benefit from the Wheelmap information. Currently almost 600,000 public places worldwide can be found on the map. About 300 new places are added on a daily basis. Wheelmap is available on the website and as an app for iOS, Android and Windows Phone.

== Tagging ==
Anyone can mark Points of Interest (bus stations, restaurants, cinemas, museums, banks, government offices, etc.).[3] according to their wheelchair accessibility on Wheelmap. A simple traffic light system is used to rate the wheelchair accessibility of a place: The markings are inserted by using the simple traffic light system:

Grün

Wheelchair accessible
* entrance: ground level, without stairs
Green:
* rooms: all rooms without stairs

* toilet (if toilets for visitors available): Accessible toilet
.

Gelb

Restricted wheelchair accessible
* entrance: one stage (7 cm/ 3 inch high) maximal
Yellow:
* rooms: ground level of the most important rooms

* toilet (if toilets for visitors available)): no matter
.

Rot

Not wheelchair accessible
* entrance: with a higher stage then 7 cm/ 3 inch, or with several stages
Red:
* rooms: not accessible

* toilet (if toilets for visitors available)): not accessible

Places that have not yet been rated on their wheelchair accessibility are marked gray. They can be marked quickly and easily by anyone, without prior registration. Registered users can add photos or comments with further details about the wheelchair accessibility of a place Registered users can add images to a location and write a comment with further details about the wheelchair accessibility of the place.

Wheelmap.org focuses on the relevant accessibility information and is not limited to wheelchair specific locations, such as therapy centers or toilets. Instead, wheelchair users should be included in everyday life, focusing on public places of daily life including cafes, clubs, theaters, and basic public services, including public transportation, government offices and banks. Similar to Wikipedia, the user enters the information such that everyone helps to grow this tool from the bottom up.

== Awards ==
- 2010 The INCA (Innovative and Creative Application) Award
- 2011 Vodafone's Smart Accessibility Award
- 2011 Werkstatt N - Award of the Council for Sustainable Development (Germany)
- 2011 As one of the 365 Landmarks in the Land of Ideas (founded by the federal government and the BDI
- 2012 World Summit Award (section mobile-inclusion & Empowerment)
- 2013 Zedler-Price for free knowledge (Wikimedia Germany)
- 2014 The first European Award for Social Entrepreneurship and Disability (title Highly Commended by the Jury to Raul Krauthausen for the project Wheelmap.org)
