= Filip Draković =

Slovenian footballer

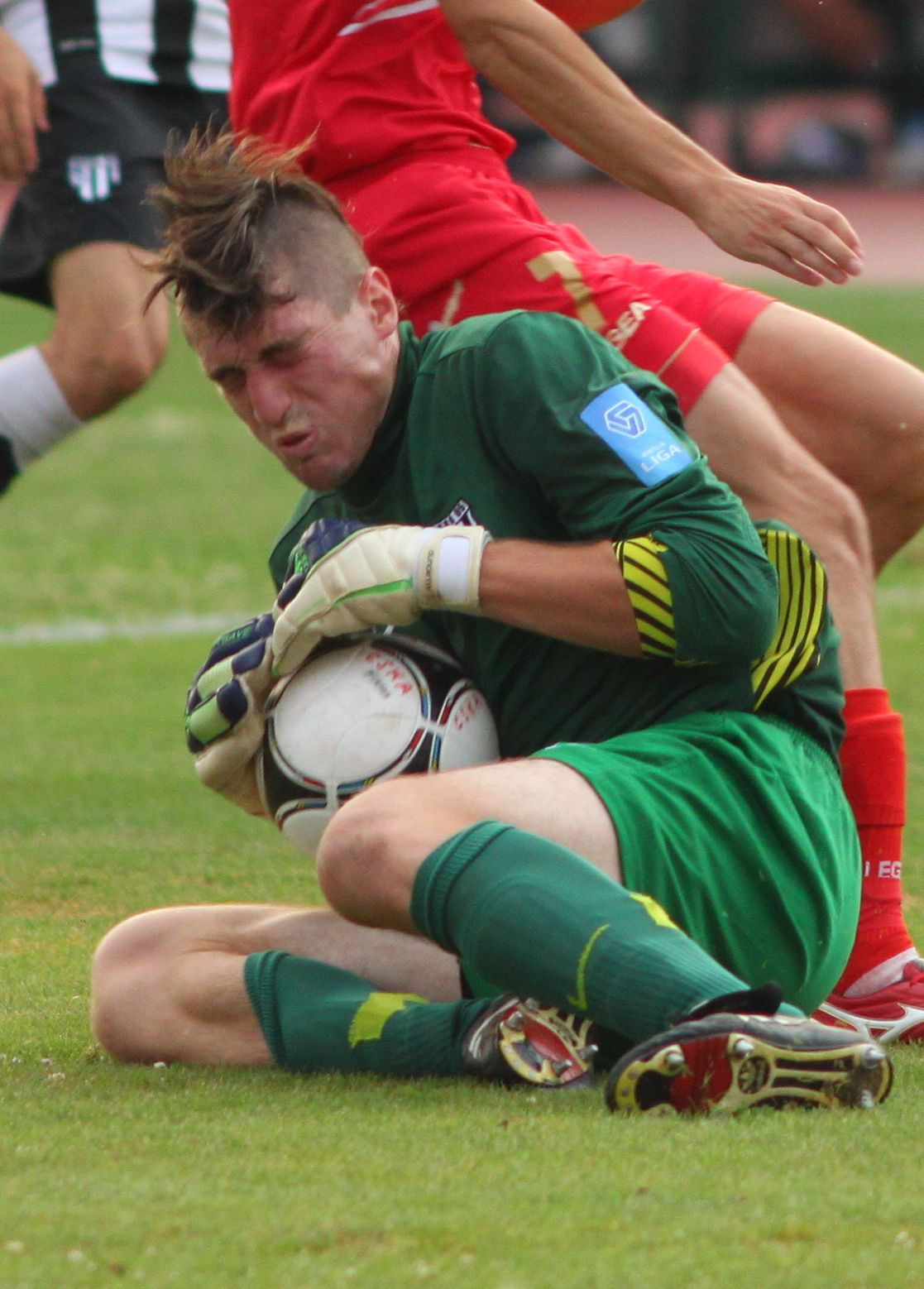

Personal information
- Full name: Filip Draković
- Date of birth: 31 March 1991 (age 35)
- Place of birth: Murska Sobota, SFR Yugoslavia
- Height: 1.92 m (6 ft 3 1/2 in)
- Position: Goalkeeper

Youth career
- –2005: Mura
- 2005–2009: Mura 05

Senior career*
Years	Team	Apps	(Gls)
2009–2013	Mura 05	58	(0)
2014-2015	Radomlje		
2016–2017	Bogojina	6	(0)
- * Club domestic league appearances and goals as of 17 August 2014

Filip Draković (born 31 March 1991 in Murska Sobota) is a former Slovenian footballer, who played as goalkeeper, former acting president of the student organization ŠSS in Ljubljana and engineer.

== Career ==
Draković began playing football for the youth selections in 2005 for Mura 05. He became a first choice goalkeeper in the 2011–12 season.

Draković had already been voted the best goalkeeper of the first round, at the beginning of the season. His transition to first pick was gradual. According to PrvaLiga statistics Drakovič was first pick for the team 16-times in the season 2011–12. Mura 05 ranked third as the PrvaLiga season 2011–12 came to a close, meaning the club qualified for The Europa League qualifications round. In the second leg of the match against FC Baku Draković kept the net intact, guaranteeing the club's progression to the second qualification round, thus earning the title "man of the match".
