= Death of Lazarus Averbuch =

Teenaged immigrant victim of a 1908 police shooting

Lazarus “Jerome” Averbuch (1889–1908) was a 19-year-old Russian-born Jewish immigrant to Chicago who was shot and killed by Chicago Chief of Police George M. Shippy on March 2, 1908. The incident occurred during an era of public fear of foreign-born anarchists in the United States, following their involvement with the Haymarket affair in 1886. The exact circumstances of the shooting remain contested, but Averbuch's death has inspired speculation, ideological arguments, and works of fiction.

== Background ==
Averbuch is referred to most often as Lazarus Averbuch, but he was likely known as Harry or Jeremiah. He was born in 1889 in Kishinev, in the Russian Empire (the present-day capital of the Republic of Moldova). He and his older sister, Olga Averbuch, survived the Kishinev pogrom. Averbuch followed his sister to Chicago, Illinois, immigrating a year after her and arriving in late 1907. They lived in a small apartment in the Eastern European Jewish neighborhood on Chicago's Near West Side. Averbuch worked as an egg packer on South Water Street in Chicago.

== Death ==
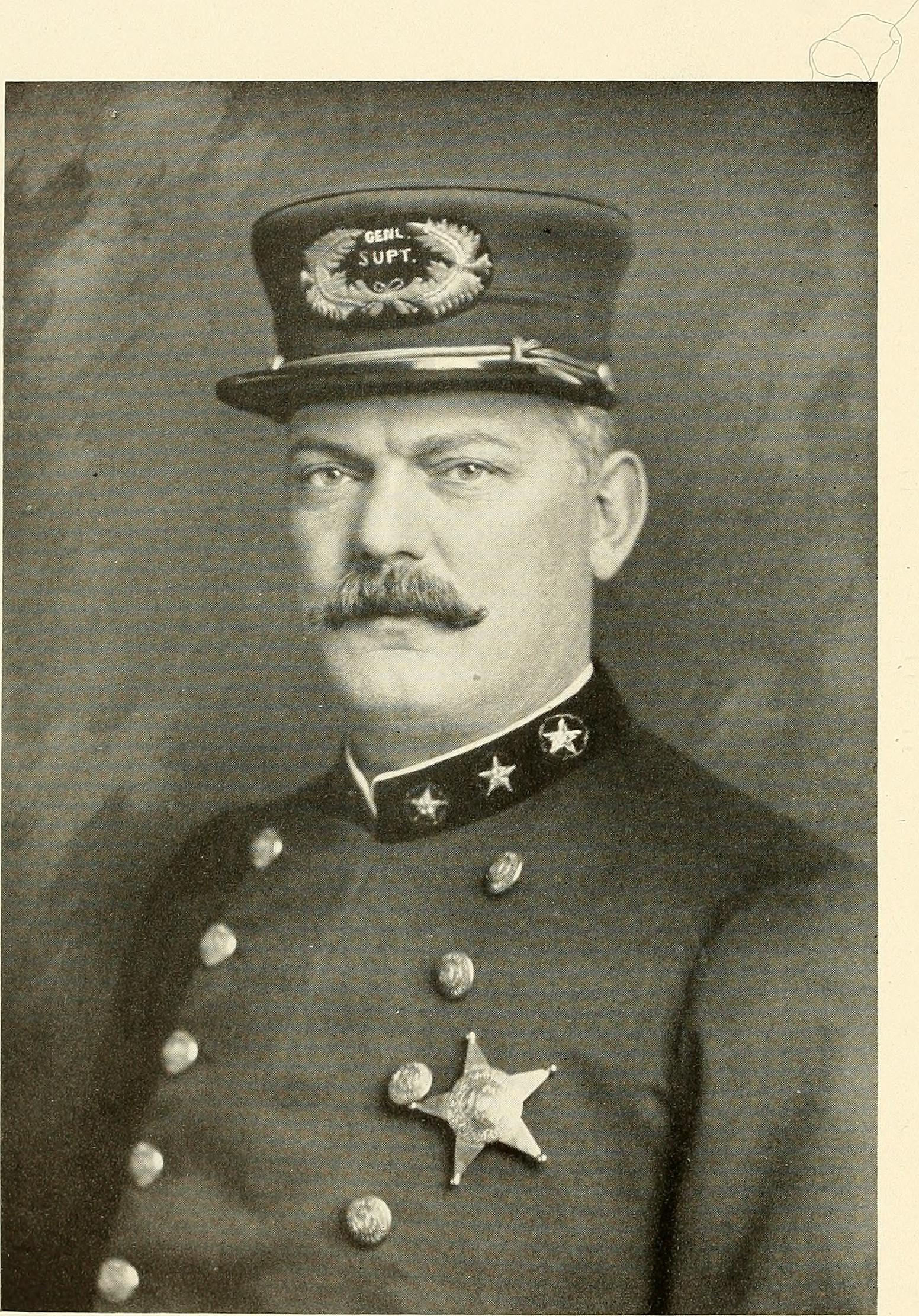
Police Captain George Shippy

Early in the morning of Monday, March 2, 1908, Lazarus Averbuch visited the home of George Shippy, Chicago's Chief of Police, in Lincoln Park. Averbuch entered the residence at 9 AM, shots were fired, and Averbuch was killed. According to Shippy, this was Averbuch's fourth visit in two days, making him a suspicious figure. When they encountered each other in Shippy's entryway, Shippy grabbed Averbuch by the arms, attempting to disable him. Averbuch then allegedly drew a knife, and wounded Shippy in the arm. Then, Averbuch drew a revolver and fired, striking Shippy's son, Harry, as he entered from upstairs to investigate the noise. Shippy's driver and bodyguard, James Foley, entered the house and attempted to restrain Averbuch. Averbuch shot Foley in the hand before he was shot repeatedly by Foley and Shippy. Newspapers reported that Averbuch, an anarchist, wanted to assassinate Shippy because Shippy shut down an anarchist demonstration.

This account has been challenged as a misinterpretation of events. Some accounts report that the only item Averbuch carried was an envelope with Shippy's name and address on it. Inside was a piece of paper, sometimes described as blank, or, it was a reused piece of paper, with the price of eggs written on one side (likely a paper from Averbuch's work). Averbuch may have been seeking a letter of good character from the police chief, which was the custom in the Russian Empire. Jewish press organizations in Chicago argued that he sought a letter of good character to travel or obtain work outside of Chicago. Some Jewish papers, mainly the Jewish Courier, also contended that all of the shots fired came from Shippy's and Foley's guns. Olga Averbuch said that her brother could not afford a gun, and did not know how to use one.

After the killing, the Chicago police initiated a search for a "curly-haired man" someone saw with Averbuch before the shooting. The police rounded up suspected anarchists and those they considered likely to become anarchists, mostly Eastern European immigrants. Such targeting of immigrants was symptomatic of the time. A federal law was adopted shortly after Averbuch's death, allowing authorities to deport recent immigrants for involvement with anarchism or other misbehavior. Two days after the shooting, anarchist Emma Goldman arrived in Chicago. Due to public outrage and negative press coverage of anarchists, she was harassed by police and cancelled her planned address.

Following Averbuch's death, Olga Averbuch was detained by the police and interrogated for 72 hours. Without first knowing he was dead, Olga was confronted with Averbuch's body, damaged from gunfire and ill treatment by angry policemen. In the days that followed, Olga struggled to convince the police and the public that Lazarus Averbuch was not an anarchist. Authorities reportedly buried Averbuch's body in a potter's field, then, when he was to be exhumed and given a Jewish burial, his body was missing. After three days, with major support from community members, his body was recovered, but his brain had been removed (possibly in an attempt to study the brain of an anarchist). After a few more days of inquiry, his brain was recovered and Averbuch was properly buried.

Olga Averbuch returned to Ukraine, in the Russian Empire. Many Jews in her region died in Nazi death camps, but Olga's name was not listed among the dead. Police Chief George Shippy never returned to work. After the shooting, Shippy developed "irrational tendencies" and was prescribed rest. This cure was not effective, and Shippy resigned his post. As the years went by, Shippy grew violent, and guards were assigned to his home to protect his family. In February 1913, Shippy was taken from his home to a mental hospital in Kankakee, Illinois. He died on April 13, 1913, of paresis, probably the result of late-stage syphilis.

== Independent investigation ==
Chief among the community members who financially and otherwise supported Olga Averbuch following her brother's death was Jane Addams. Addams' Hull House assisted many Eastern European Jewish immigrants since its establishment in 1889, near Averbuch's neighborhood. Addams did not believe Shippy's version of events, and was moved by Olga's inability to get even a proper burial for her brother. Addams mobilized the resources of Hull House and raised at least $10,000, perhaps as much as $40,000, for Olga and for her brother's burial. Addams was also instrumental starting the independent investigation into Averbuch's death. She hired lawyer Harold LeClair Ickes for what would be his first case. He ordered Averbuch's body exhumed, and had an independent autopsy performed. This autopsy showed that Averbuch was fatally wounded by a shot from behind, and that he was shot at least once from above. Ickes discovered that Averbuch's brain was removed (a violation of civil and Jewish law). The evidence of this autopsy, as well as the testimony of Olga Averbuch and Lazarus Averbuch's boss at the egg packing facility were presented at the coroner's inquest on March 24, 1908. However, the jury decided the shooting was justified, and Shippy and Foley were exonerated.

== Antisemitism in the Averbuch case ==
Averbuch's murder led to heightened antisemitism in Chicago. Newspapers reported that Jewish neighborhoods were hotbeds of anarchist plots. Jane Addams wrote that in the days following Averbuch's death, "In the public excitement, good citizens jumped to the conclusion disseminated by certain newspapers that the ghetto was full of 'anarchists' and 'anarchist plots'." Antisemitism was condoned because Jewishness was conflated with anarchism.

== Literature ==
Jane Addams responded to the Averbuch murder with an essay, "The Chicago Settlements and Social Unrest," printed in Charities and the Commons. Addams, speaking from her position as the head of a settlement house, argued that immigrants were treated as poorly or more poorly by the authorities in America as they had been treated in their home countries. Besides Jane Addams' essay, others found inspiration in Averbuch's death. Walter Roth and Joe Kraus's book, An Accidental Anarchist: How the Killing of a Humble Jewish Immigrant by Chicago's Chief of Police Exposed the Conflict between Law and Order and Civil Rights in Early Twentieth Century America, aims to reconstruct the context of Averbuch's death and studies the perspectives of the parties involved. The story of Lazarus Averbuch struck author Aleksander Hemon as a failure of the American Dream. His novel, The Lazarus Project, follows an Eastern European immigrant to America discovering the story of Lazarus Averbuch.

== Legacy ==
The location of Averbuch's death is memorialized with a plaque at 2131 N. Hudson in the Lincoln Park neighborhood, where he was killed. The sign states, "In memory of Lazarus Averbuch who emigrated from Russia in 1908 and died here shortly thereafter."
