= Prix Dentan =

Swiss literary award

The Prix Dentan is a Swiss literary award created in 1984 and named for Professor Michel Dentan.

== Laureates ==
- 2025 Sandro Marcacci for Me taire, Éditions d’en bas, 2025
- 2024 Catherine Lovey for Histoire de l’homme qui ne voulait pas mourir, Zoé, 2024
- 2023 Corinne Desarzens for Un Noël avec Winston, La Baconnière, 2023
- 2022 Emmanuelle Fournier-Lorentz for Villa Royale, Gallimard, 2022
- 2021 Bruno Pellegrino for Dans la ville provisoire, Zoé, 2021
- 2020 Pascal Janovjak for Le Zoo de Rome, Actes Sud, 2019
- 2019 Rinny Gremaud for Un monde en toc, Seuil, 2018
- 2018 Jean François Billeter for Une autre Aurélia et Une Rencontre à Pékin, Allia, 2017
- 2017 Claude Tabarini for Rue des Gares et autres lieux rêvés, Héros-Limite, 2016
- 2016 David Bosc for Mourir et puis sauter sur son cheval, Verdier, 2016
- 2015 Antoinette Rychner for Le Prix, Paris, Buchet/Chastel, 2015
- 2014 Philippe Rahmy for Béton armé - Shanghai au cors à corps, Paris, La Table Ronde, 2013
- 2013 Jean-Pierre Rochat for L'écrivain suisse allemand, Geneva, éditions d’Autre Part, 2012
- 2012 Not awarded (lack of agreement between the members of the jury)
- 2011 Co-laureates
  - Douna Loup, for L'Embrasure, Paris, Mercure de France, 2010,
  - Alexandre Friederich, for Ogrorog, Meyrin, éditions des sauvages, 2011
- 2010 Noëlle Revaz, for Efina, Paris, Éditions Gallimard, 2009
- 2009 Jean-Bernard Vuillème, for Pléthore ressuscité, Neuchâtel, Editions de la Nouvelle Revue neuchâteloise, 2008
- 2008 Co-laureates
  - Ghislaine Dunant, for Un effondrement, Paris, Éditions Grasset, 2007,
  - Jean-François Haas, for Dans la gueule de la baleine guerre, Paris, Seuil, 2007.
- 2007 Catherine Safonoff, Autour de ma mère, Geneva, Zoé, 2007
- 2006 Anne-Lou Steininger, Les Contes des jours volés, Bernard Campiche editeur, 2006,
- 2005 Jean-Luc Benoziglio, Louis Capet, suite et fin, Seuil, 2005.
- 2004 Jean-Michel Olivier, for L'enfant secret, Lausanne, L'Age d'homme, 2004.
- 2003 Michel Layaz, for Les larmes de ma mère, Geneva Zoé, 2003.
- 2002 Etienne Barilier, for L'énigme, Geneva, Zoé, 2001.
- 2001 Jean-Jacques Langendorf, for La nuit tombe, Dieu regarde, Geneva, Zoé, 2000.
- 2000 Frédérik Pajak, for L'immense solitude. Avec Friedrich Nietzsche et Cesare Pavese, orphelins sous le ciel de Turin, Paris, Presses Universitaires de France, 1999.
- 1999 Claude Darbellay, for Les prétendants, Zoé, 1998.
- 1998 Daniel Maggetti, for Chambre 112, L'Aire, 1997.
- 1997 Claudine Roulet, for Rien qu'une écaille, Sierre, Monographic, 1996.
- 1996 Co-laureates
  - Ivan Farron, for Un après-midi avec Wackernagel, Geneva, Zoé, 1995,
  - Pascale Kramer, for Manu, Paris, Calmann-Lévy, 1995.
- 1995 Elisabeth Horem, for Le ring, Yvonand, Bernard Campiche, 1994.
- 1994 Daniel de Roulet, for Virtuellement vôtre, Dole (F) / Saint-Imier (CH), Canevas Editeur, 1993.
- 1993 Yves Laplace, for On, Paris, Éditions du Seuil, 1992.
- 1992 Silvia Ricci-Lempen, for Un homme tragique, Lausanne, L'Aire, 1991.
- 1991 Jean Pache, for La straniera, Geneva, Zoé, 1990.
- 1990 François Debluë, for Troubles fêtes, Lausanne, L'Age d'homme, 1989.
- 1989 Rose-Marie Pagnard, for La période Fernandez, Arles, Actes Sud, 1988, and Sans eux la vie serait un désert, Lausanne, L'Aire, 1988.
- 1988 Marie-Claire Dewarrat, for Carême, Lausanne, L'Aire, 1987.
- 1987 Claude Delarue, for La mosaïque, Paris, Seuil, 1986.
- 1985 Jean-Marc Lovay, for Le convoi du colonel Fürst, Geneva, Éditions de Zoé, 1985.
- 1984 Jacqueline Tanner, for La Maryssée, Lausanne, L'Aire, 1984.
