= Swiss Literature Awards =

The Swiss Literature Awards (which were known as the Federal Literature Awards) is a Swiss literary award presented by the Federal Office of Culture (FOC).

== History ==
The organization of the Awards is given to FOC in the context of the Law of Encouragement for Culture (LEC). They replace the Schiller Prize which was awarded for the last time in the spring of 2012. In December 2012 the Swiss Literature Awards rewarded eight literary works that had marked the year. The federal literature jury, presided over by Dominik Müller, made their choice for this first award from 236 participating works.

== Principals ==
The awarded authors receive 25,000 Swiss francs each and benefit from specific support measures, so that they may be better known on the national level. Lectures are organized in all of Switzerland so that they may reach their public beyond the linguistic boundaries of the languages of Switzerland. The quadrilingual web platform Prixliterature.ch presents the jury's commentary about the prizewinning works and gives a first impression of the author's life experience and bibliography.

== Winners ==
Year	Grand Prix Winner	Literature Award Winners	Special Prize Winners	Source
2024	Klaus Merz	Bessora, «Vous, les ancêtres»; Jérémie Gindre, «Tombola»; Judith Keller, «Wilde Manöver»; Dominic Oppliger, «Giftland»; Claudia Quadri, «Infanzia e bestiario»; Ed Wige, «Milch Lait Latte Mleko»; Ivna Zic, «Wahrscheinliche Herkünfte»	Dorothea Trottenberg	
2023	Leta Semadeni	Prisca Agustoni, «Verso la ruggine»; Jachen Andry, «be cun rispli»; Fanny Desarzens, «Galel»; Eugène, «Lettre à mon dictateur»; Lioba Happel, «Pommfritz aus der Hölle»; Lika Nüssli, «Starkes Ding»; Anne-Sophie Subilia, «L'Épouse»	Schulhausroman	
2022	Reto Hänny	Yari Bernasconi, «La casa vuota»; Rebecca Gisler, «D’oncle»; Dana Grigorcea, «Die nicht sterben»; Ariane Koch, «Die Aufdrängung»; Christian Kracht, «Eurotrash»; Fabienne Radi, «Email diamant»; Isabelle Sbrissa, «tout tient tout»	Maurizia Balmelli	
