= The Lazarus Project (novel) =

2008 novel by Aleksandar Hemon

- First edition cover design
- Author: Aleksandar Hemon
- Language: English
- Genre: Novel
- Publisher: Riverhead Books
- Publication date: 1 May 2008
- Publication place: United States
- Media type: Print (hardcover)
- Pages: 304 pp
- ISBN: 978-1-59448-988-4
- OCLC: 183267842

The Lazarus Project is a 2008 novel by Bosnian fiction writer and journalist Aleksandar Hemon. It features the true story of the death of Lazarus Averbuch, a teenaged Jewish immigrant to Chicago who was shot and killed by a police officer in 1908. It was a finalist for the 2008 National Book Award and National Book Critics Circle Award, as well as, the winner of the inaugural Jan Michalski Prize for Literature in 2010.

== Reception ==
The Lazarus Project received starred reviews from Booklist, Kirkus Reviews, and Publishers Weekly.

Kirkus called the book "[a] literary page-turner that combines narrative momentum with meditations on identity and mortality."

Glyn Maxwell with London Review of Books commented, "Stories. True stories, false stories, good stories, rotten stories. Everything in Hemon’s beautiful new novel trembles within this matrix, where a story’s force or charm is at least as significant as its veracity."

Numerous reviewers highlighted Hemon's prose. Publishers Weekly said, "Hemon’s workmanlike prose underscores his piercing wit, and between the murders that bookend the novel, there’s pathos and outrage enough to chip away at even the hardest of hearts." Booklist's Donna Seaman agreed with the sentiment: "Hemon’s sentences seethe and hiss, their dangerous beauty matched by Velibor Bozovic’s eloquent black-and-white photographs, creating an excoriating novel of rare moral clarity." Carol Anshaw, writing for Los Angeles Times added, "Hemon is immensely talented — a natural storyteller and a poet, a maker of amazing, gorgeous sentences in what is his second language."

In Literary Review, John Dugdale wrote: "Aleksandar Hemon is essentially a miniaturist with a flair for stylistically striking description, at his best here in passages evoking Olga’s apartment and neighbourhood. On this evidence he should stick to the sketches and short stories at which he excels, rather than acceding to the familiar pressures to produce long-form fiction."

Writing for the New York Times, Cathleen Schine says the book is "a remarkable, and remarkably entertaining, chronicle of loss and hopelessness and cruelty propelled by an eloquent, irritable existential unease. It is, against all odds, full of humor and full of jokes."

Writing for The Guardian, James Lasdun provided a negative review, noting

The Lazarus Project is one of several recent books that orbit these subjects. Its sentiments are all very correct and laudable, but as a novel it seems to me largely a failure. It opts, initially, for the oblique angle... Period reconstruction clearly isn't Hemon's game... What seem to interest him more are the various practical and metaphysical questions raised by his own desire to tell the story. The result is a familiar postmodern construction: a novel about the writing of a novel ...Lacking the pressure of a plot, these passages stake everything on their pure interest as writing.

Awards and honors for The Lazarus Project
Year	Award/Honor	Result	Ref.
2008	Booklist Editors' Choice: Adult Books	Selection	
2008	Chicago Tribune Heartland Prize for Fiction	Winner	
2008	National Book Critics Circle Award for Fiction	Finalist	
2008	National Book Award for Fiction	Finalist	
2009	Society of Midland Authors Award for Adult Fiction	Winner	
2010	Jan Michalski Prize for Literature	Winner	

== See also ==
- Isaiah Eleven (2008) novel set in Chicago
