= Aleksandar Hemon =

Bosnian-American author, essayist, critic, television writer and screenwriter

Aleksandar Hemon Александар Хемон
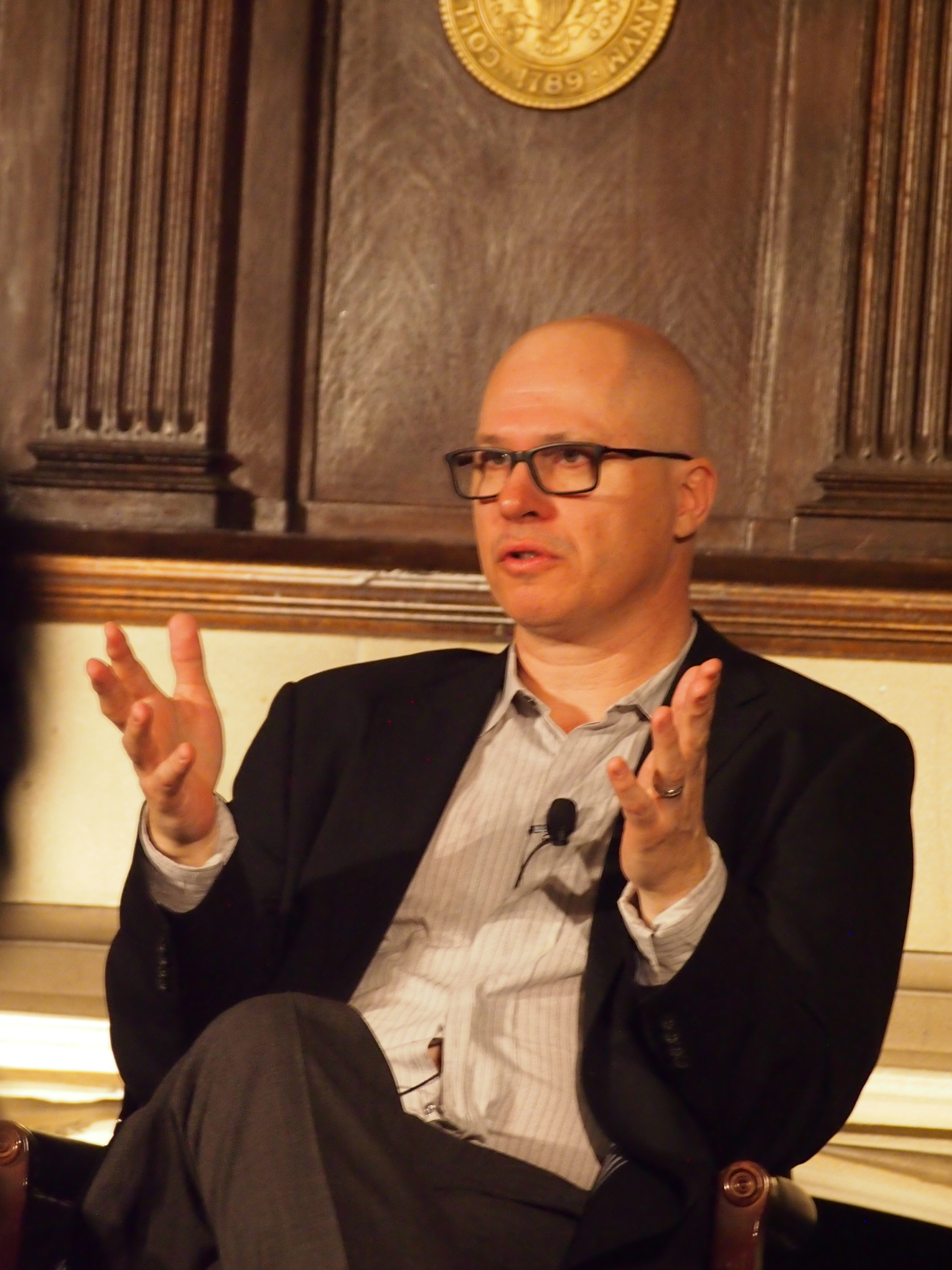
- Hemon in 2017
- Born: September 9, 1964 (age 61); Sarajevo, SR Bosnia and Herzegovina, SFR Yugoslavia
- Education: University of Sarajevo, Northwestern University
- Occupations: Short story writer; novelist; columnist; television writer; screenwriter
- Writing career
- Period: 2000–present
- Movement: Postmodernism
- Website: aleksandarhemon.com

Aleksandar Hemon (Serbo-Croatian Cyrillic: Александар Xeмoн; born September 9, 1964) is a Bosnian-American author, essayist, critic, television writer, and screenwriter. He is best known for the novels Nowhere Man (2002) and The Lazarus Project (2008), and his scriptwriting as a co-writer of The Matrix Resurrections (2021).

He frequently publishes in The New Yorker and has also written for Esquire, The Paris Review, the Op-Ed page of The New York Times, and the Sarajevo magazine BH Dani.

Hemon is also a musician, distributing his Electronica work under the pseudonym "Cielo Hemon."

== Biography ==
Hemon was born in Sarajevo, Bosnia and Herzegovina, then Yugoslavia, to a father of partial Ukrainian descent and a Bosnian mother. Hemon's great-grandfather, Teodor Hemon, came to Bosnia from Galicia in Western Ukraine prior to World War I, when both regions were a part of the Austro-Hungarian Empire.

Hemon graduated from the University of Sarajevo and was a published writer in former Yugoslavia by the time he was 26.

Since 1992 he has lived in the United States, where he found himself as a tourist and became stranded at the outbreak of the war in Bosnia. In the U.S. he worked as a Greenpeace canvasser, sandwich assembly-line worker, bike messenger, graduate student in English literature, bookstore salesperson, and ESL teacher. He earned his master's degree from Northwestern University in 1996.

He was awarded a MacArthur Foundation grant in 2004.

He published his first story in English, "The Life and Work of Alphonse Kauders" in Triquarterly in 1995, followed by "The Sorge Spy Ring," also in Triquarterly in 1996, "A Coin" in Chicago Review in 1997, "Islands" in Ploughshares in 1998, and eventually "Blind Jozef Pronek" in The New Yorker in 1999. His work also eventually appeared in Esquire, The Paris Review, Best American Short Stories, and elsewhere. Hemon also has a bi-weekly column, written and published in Bosnian, called "Hemonwood" in the Sarajevo-based magazine, BH Dani (BH Days).

Hemon is currently a professor of creative writing at Princeton University, where he lives with his second wife, Teri Boyd, and their daughters Ella and Esther. The couple's second child, 1-year-old daughter Isabel, died of complications associated with a brain tumor in November 2010. Hemon published an essay, "The Aquarium," about Isabel's death in the June 13/20, 2011 issue of The New Yorker.

Hemon grew up near the Grbavica Stadium, and he is a supporter of the Željo, as the Sarajevo based football club FK Željezničar is affectionately called, with a membership. He is also a supporter of Liverpool Football Club.

== Works ==
In 2000 Hemon published his first book, The Question of Bruno, which included short stories and a novella.

His second book, Nowhere Man, followed in 2002. Variously referred to as a novel and as a collection of linked stories, Nowhere Man concerns Jozef Pronek, a character who earlier appeared in one of the stories in The Question of Bruno. It was a finalist for the 2002 National Book Critics Circle Award.

In June 2006, Exchange of Pleasant Words and A Coin were published by Picador.

On 1 May 2008, Hemon released The Lazarus Project, inspired by the story of Lazarus Averbuch, which featured photographs by Hemon's childhood friend, photographer Velibor Božović. The novel was a finalist for the 2008 National Book Award, the 2008 National Book Critics Circle Award, and was named as a "New York Times Notable Book" and New York magazine's No. 1 Book of the Year.

In May 2009, Hemon released a collection of stories, Love and Obstacles, which were largely written at the same time as he wrote The Lazarus Project.

In 2011, Hemon was awarded the PEN/W.G. Sebald Award chosen by the judges Jill Ciment, Salvatore Scibona, and Gary Shteyngart.

Hemon's first nonfiction book, The Book of My Lives, was released in 2013.

Hemon's novel The Making of Zombie Wars was released in 2015.

In 2019, he published My Parents: An Introduction. This and This Does Not Belong to You actually makes two "discrete but complementary" works of nonfiction, his second and third, and concerns the "nature of storytelling, memory, history and homeland": Thematically, My Parents: An Introduction is organized family memoir, while This Does Not Belong to You is "fragmentary reminiscences" of author’s own "Bosnian childhood".

On August 20, 2019, it was announced that Hemon would co-write the script for The Matrix Resurrections alongside David Mitchell and Lana Wachowski. The film was released on December 22, 2021.

His latest novel The World and All That it Holds was published on February 2, 2023. It was the winner of the 2023 Grand Prix de Littérature Américaine, which honors the best American novel translated into French and published in France. (The book was published in France as Un monde de ciel et de terre by Calmann-Lévy, translated by Michèle Albaret-Maatsch.)

== Articles ==
Perhaps the esteemed Nobel Committee is so invested in the preservation of Western civilization that to it a page of Mr. Handke is worth a thousand Muslim lives. (...) For them, genocide comes and goes, but literature is forever.

— A. Hemon, The New York Times

In October 2019, Hemon joined many intellectuals in an international public outcry against the decision of the Nobel Committee to award Peter Handke a Nobel Prize in Literature earlier that month (they opposed the award because of Handke's support of the late Slobodan Milošević and the author's Bosnian genocide denial). Hemon wrote an opinion piece in The New York Times, published October 15, criticizing the Nobel committee for its decision.

== TV and film ==
While in the United States, Aleksandar Hemon started working as a screenwriter, and collaborated with Lana Wachowski (the Wachowskis) and David Mitchell as co-writer on the finale of the TV show Sense8 and the film The Matrix Resurrections.

== Critical reception ==
As an accomplished fiction writer who learned English as an adult, Hemon has some similarities to Joseph Conrad, which he acknowledges through allusion in The Question of Bruno, though he is most frequently compared to Vladimir Nabokov. All of his stories deal in some way with the Yugoslav Wars, Bosnia, or Chicago, but they vary substantially in genre.

== Awards ==
- 2017 PEN America Jean Stein Grant For Literary Oral History, for How Did You Get Here?: Tales of Displacement
- 2013 National Book Critics Circle Award (Autobiography) shortlist for The Book of My Lives
- 2012 United States Artists Fellow Award.
- 2012 National Magazine Award for Essay and Criticism, for "The Aquarium"
- 2011 PEN/W.G. Sebald Award
- 2011 Premio Gregor von Rezzori for foreign fiction translated into Italian for The Lazarus Project (Il Progetto Lazarus), translated by Maurizia Balmelli (Einaudi)
- 2009 National Magazine Award for Fiction, for The New Yorker
- 2009 St. Francis College Literary Prize
- 2008 National Book Award, finalist, for The Lazarus Project
- 2008 National Book Critics Circle Award, finalist, for The Lazarus Project
- 2004 MacArthur Fellows Program from the MacArthur Foundation
- 2003 Guggenheim Fellowship
- 2003 National Book Critics Circle Award, finalist, for Nowhere Man
- 2001 John C. Zacharis First Book Award, for The Question of Bruno

== Selected bibliography ==
Novels

- 2002 Nowhere Man, ISBN 9780330393508, OCLC 698889361
- 2008 The Lazarus Project, ISBN 9781440637490, OCLC 883331173
- 2015 The Making of Zombie Wars, ISBN 9780374203412, OCLC 953255017
- 2023 The World and All That It Holds, ISBN 9780374287702, OCLC 1344332737

Short story collections

- 2000 The Question of Bruno, ISBN 9780385499231
- 2009 Love and Obstacles. Riverhead Books, ISBN 9781594488641.

Nonfiction

- 2013 The Book of My Lives, ISBN 9780374115739
- 2019 My Parents: An Introduction / This Does Not Belong to You, ISBN 9780374217433.

Essays

- 2014 "The Matters of Life, Death, and More: Writing on Soccer", ISBN 9780374713164
- 2015 "My Prisoner", ISBN 9780374713102

Short fiction

- "The Liar," collected in The Book of Other People (Zadie Smith, editor)
- "The Conductor," collected in The Best American Short Stories 2006 (Ann Patchett, editor); first published in The New Yorker, February 28, 2005
- "Love and obstacles". The New Yorker. Vol. 81, no. 38. November 28, 2005.
- "The noble truths of suffering". The New Yorker. Vol. 84, no. 29. September 22, 2008.

Articles

- "A shining monument of loss". Granta. 103: 29–31. Autumn 2008. Archived from the original on December 26, 2010.
- "If God existed, He'd be a solid midfielder". Granta. 108. Autumn 2009.

Editor

- 2010 Best European Fiction 2010
- 2010 Best European Fiction 2011
- 2011 Best European Fiction 2012
- 2012 Best European Fiction 2013
