= Raúl Aguayo-Krauthausen =

Activist

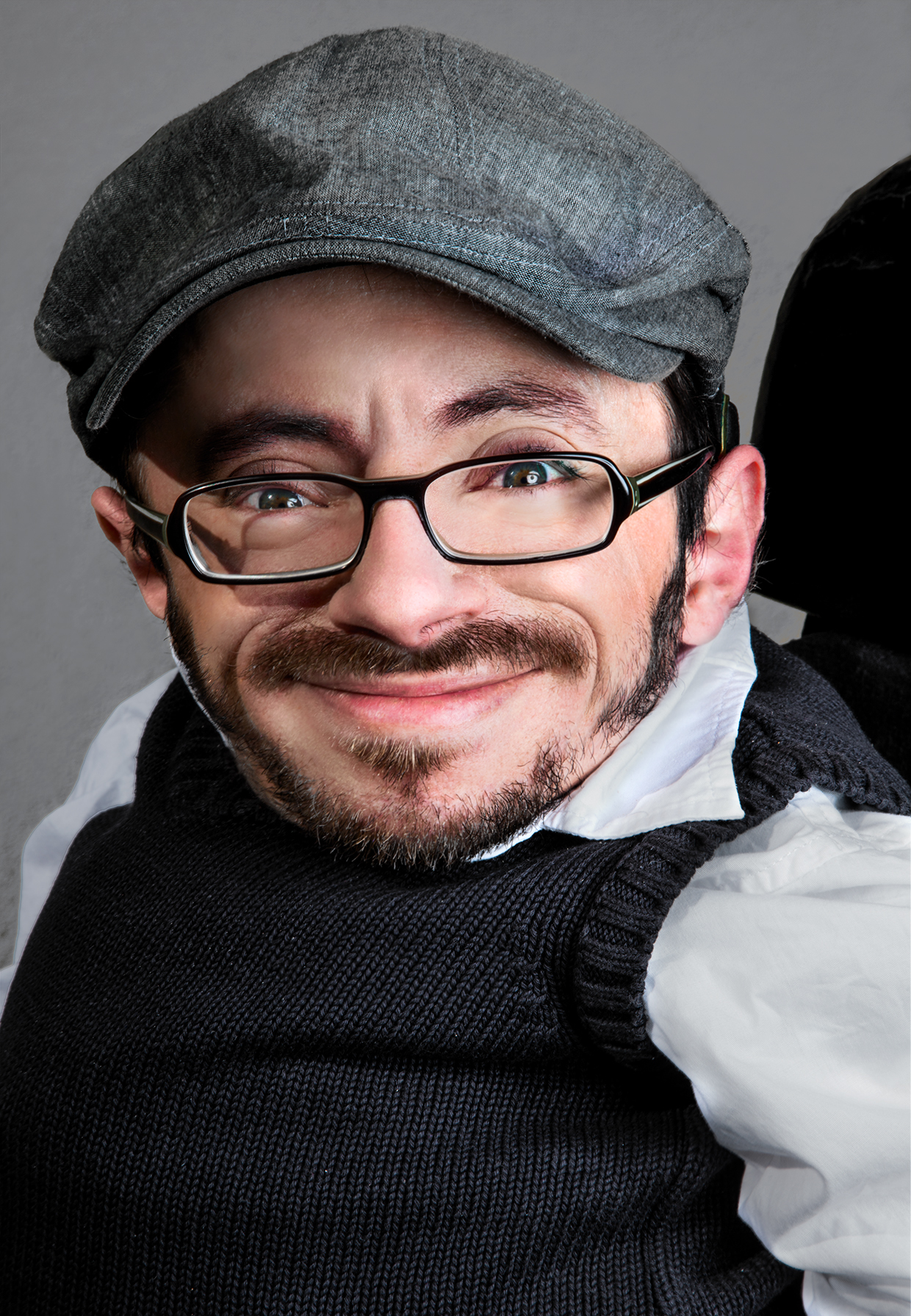
- Born: 1980 (age 45–46); Lima, Peru
- Education: Berlin University of the Arts; Hasso Plattner Institute
- Occupations: Corporate communication, design thinking
- Organization: Sozialhelden e.V.
- Known for: Wheelmap.org
- Movement: Human rights, Disability rights
- Awards: Order of Merit of Germany
- Website: http://raul.de/

Raúl Aguayo-Krauthausen (born July 15, 1980, in Lima, Peru) is a German disability rights activist. He was awarded the Order of Merit of Germany and is an Ashoka Fellow.

== Early life and education ==
Krauthausen grew up in Berlin and attended one of the first inclusive schools as a child. He claims that going to this school is what laid the foundation stone for his career. After he finished school, Krauthausen decided to study social and business communication, which he says gave him a new perspective on life as a person with a disability.

Krauthausen has said that throughout his life, he never wanted to think much about his disability. His parents always tried to make him play with other kids who were disabled, but he thought this was weird. However, when he entered college and was the only person with a disability, he changed his view. He missed the contact he had with other disabled persons. This is when he decided to start his nonprofit organisation.

He studied Social and Economic Communication at the Berlin University of the Arts and Design Thinking at the HPI School of Design Thinking.

== Career ==
Together with his cousin, Jan, he founded the nonprofit organisation Sozialhelden, which translates to social heroes, in 2004. He works alongside his colleague, Svenja Heinecke, on projects to make Germany and the rest of the world accessible. The organisation develops projects which address social issues and offer practical solutions in a spirit of diversity and inclusion. Their fundraising project Pfandtastisch helfen, which raises funds for other nonprofit organisations through donated bottle recycling receipts, received the Startsocial prize from Chancellor Angela Merkel in 2008. In 2010, Wheelmap.org, a crowdsourced online map for finding and marking wheelchair accessible places was launched by Sozialhelden. The map, which is available in 22 languages, is based on OpenStreetMap and operates under a Creative-Commons license. Wheelmap has worked with German phonebook provider, "Gelbe Seiten" to offer accessibility information about places that were already in the book. Krauthausen and his colleagues also invented Accessibility Cloud, a cloud that allows data on accessibility to be easily transferred to international organizations with the same goal. The overall goal of Krauthausen's nonprofit is "Disability Mainstreaming".

In addition to his work for Sozialhelden Raúl Krauthausen co-founded Selfpedia.de in 2013, an online self-help community for questions and advice pertaining to life with a disability. Raúl Krauthausen is a frequent guest on talk shows and a popular interview partner for journalists regarding topics related to disability rights, accessibility and inclusion.

In October 2016 Krauthausen went undercover in a German home for people with disabilities. He shaved his beard, cut his hair and even got rid of his signature hat. For five days he lived in the home and uncovered some harsh truths about the complete loss of independence that comes with being a disabled person in a care home. Krauthausen's undercover investigation was discussed by German politicians and decision-makers but did not lead to a change in legislation.

One of the newest Sozialhelden projects is Leidmedien.de, an online platform for journalists and others whose work involves the portrayal of people with disabilities. Through advocacy, articles, workshops and informational materials Leidmedien.de offers perspectives on life with a disability which steer away from stereotypes and clichés.

In 2014 Raúl Krauthausen developed a printable 3D mini ramp which can be used to overcome sidewalk curbs in a wheelchair.

Raúl Krauthausen has osteogenesis imperfecta, also known as brittle bone disease, and uses a wheelchair.

Krauthausen sees the Americans with Disability Act as a role model that he thinks Germany should follow. He believes that Germany doesn't score high in terms of accessibility in relation to other European countries.

== Personal life ==
Krauthausen's partner is also disabled. Krauthausen says that he is fine with children being curious and asking him questions about his disability, but he is much stricter when it comes to adults and parents.

== Awards ==
- 2009: Deutscher Engagementpreis (German Prize for Engagement)
- 2010: Deutscher Bürgerpreis (German citizen Price)
- 2010: Appointment as Ashoka Fellow
- 2010: Inca-Award (Sozialhelden)
- 2011: Vodafone Smart Accessibility Award
- 2013: Order of Merit of Germany (Bundesverdienstkreuz am Bande) for his Engagement of Sozialhelden.
- 2018: Grimme Online Award

== See also ==
- Independent Living
