= Maurizia Balmelli =

Swiss literary translator

Maurizia Balmelli (born 1970) is a Swiss-born literary translator, currently residing in Paris. She has translated a number of notable works from English and French into Italian, including works by Sally Rooney, Aleksandar Hemon, Martin Amis, Ian McEwan, Mary Gaitskill, J. M. G. Le Clézio, Emmanuel Carrère, and others. She has won several awards for her translations, including the Swiss Special Prize for Translation, the Gregor von Rezzori Prize and the Terra Nova Prize.

== Biography ==
Balmelli was born in Locarno, Switzerland, in 1970, and grew up on Lake Maggiore, in Switzerland. She currently lives in Paris, France. She initially studied theatre, at the École Internationale de Théâtre Jacques Lecoq in Paris, and later at the Holden School in Turin, where she now teaches an annual French translation workshop.

== Career ==
Balmelli has translated works by several notable authors from French and English into Italian, including Sally Rooney, Aleksandar Hemon, Martin Amis, Wallace Stegner, Ian McEwan, Mary Gaitskill, Miriam Toews, J.M.G. Le Clézio, Emmanuel Carrère, Agota Kristof, Tahar Ben Jelloun, Marie Darrieussecq, Jean Echenoz, Cormac McCarthy, Noëlle Revaz, Yasmina Reza, and Fred Vargas. In 2022, she was awarded the Swiss Federal Office of Culture's Special Prize for Translation, and was cited as "one of the most significant translators from French and English to Italian," and commended for building "...bridges between different literatures, dedicating a constant, precious commitment to teaching and training." Her translations have been published by several notable Italian publishers, including Arnoldo Mondadori Editore, Adelphi Edizioni, and Marcos y Marcos. Her recent translations of Sally Rooney's books, Normal People and Beautiful World, Where Are You, received critical appreciation in the Italian press.

She has translated over 80 books into Italian over the course of her career.

== Awards ==
- (2010) Gregor von Rezzori Prize for translating Cormac McCarthy's Suttree from English to Italian
- (2014) The Schiller Foundation's Terra Nova Prize for translating Noëlle Revaz's Heart of the Beast from French to Italian
- (2022) Swiss Federal Office of Culture's Special Prize for Translation
