= List of Swiss women writers =

This is a list of women writers who were born in Switzerland or whose writings are closely associated with that country.

== B ==
- Elisabeth Baumgartner (1889–1957), Swiss author of play is Bernese German dialect
- Béatrix Beck (1914–2008), Swiss-born Belgian writing in French, novelist
- Maja Beutler (1936–2021), German-language novelist, short story writer, playwright
- S. Corinna Bille (1912–1979), short story writer, poet, novelist, children's writer
- Teresina Bontempi (1883–1968), Italian-language Swiss journalist, editor
- Irena Brežná (born 1950), Slovak-Swiss writer, journalist, activist
- Erika Burkart (1922–2010), German language poet, short story writer, novelist
- Martha Burkhardt (1874–1958), Swiss-born travel writer

== C ==
- Dominique Caillat (born 1956), playwright, non-fiction writer, works in German, French and English
- Corinne Chaponnière (born 1954), Swiss-Canadian writer
- Anne Cuneo (1936–2015), French-language novelist, journalist, screenwriter
- Suzanne Curchod (1737–1794), French-language non-fiction writer, salonist

== D ==
- Laurence Deonna (1937–2023), journalist, writer and photographer specializing in the Middle-East

== E ==
- Isabelle Eberhardt (1877–1904), French-language journalist, travel writer
- Marianne Ehrmann (1755–1795), early German-language novelist, journalist
- Dorothee Elmiger (born 1985), German-language novelist and essayist
- Ruth Erat (born 1951), German-language narrative works

== F ==
- Marie-Louise von Franz (1915–1998), German-language psychologist, writings on symbolism

== G ==
- Valérie de Gasparin (1813–1894), French-language non-fiction writer
- Romana Ganzoni (born 1967), German and Rumansh-language novelist and essayist
- Marthe Gosteli (1917–2017), Swiss women's history archivist and suffrage writer
- Emilie Gourd (1879–1946), French-language journalist, feminist
- Anne-Lise Grobéty (1949–2010), French-language novelist, poet, young adults writer

== H ==
- Anita Hansemann (1962–2019), Late start writer, books and libretto play
- Eveline Hasler (born 1933), German-language novelist, children's writer, essayist, playwright
- Jeanne Hersch (1910–2000), French-language writings on philosophy, human rights
- Meta Heusser-Schweizer (1797–1876), German-language poet

== I ==
- Mirjam Indermaur (born 1967), German-language non-fiction writer
- Henriette Ith (1885-1978), French-language writer and political activist

== J ==
- Fleur Jaeggy (born 1940), Italian-language novelist
- Zoë Jenny (born 1974), German-language novelist, widely translated
- Hanna Johansen (1939–2023), novelist, children's writer, translator

== K ==
- Isabelle Kaiser (1866–1925), poet, novelist, writing in both French and German
- Agota Kristof (1935–2011), French-language novelist, poet, playwright
- Christina Krüsi (born 1968), author of the autobiographical Paradise Was My Hell describing child abuse

== L ==
- Monique Laederach (1938–2004), poet, novelist, translator
- Gertrud Leutenegger (1948–2025), poet, novelist, playwright and theatre director

== M ==
- Ella Maillart (1903–1997), French-language travel writer
- Janine Massard (born 1939), French-language novelist
- Jane Marcet (1769–1858), English-language writings on science
- Mariella Mehr (1947–2022), German-language novelist
- Isabelle de Montolieu (1751–1832), French-language novelist, translator
- Hortensia von Moos (1659–1715), German-language writings on the status of women

== N ==
- Marguerite Naville (1852–1930), painter, photographer and diarist

== P ==
- Erica Pedretti (1930–2022), German-language non-fiction writer, essayist, playwright
- Amélie Plume (born 1943), novelist, playwright

== R ==
- Ilma Rakusa (born 1946), writer, essayist, poet & translator
- Grisélidis Réal (1929–2005), sex worker, writer
- Alice Rivaz (1901–1998), French-language novelist, essayist, feminist
- Noëlle Roger (1874–1953), French-language novelist
- Annelise Rüegg (1879–1934), biographer, pacifist, communist

== S ==
- Isabelle Sbrissa (born 1971), poet, playwright
- Anka Schmid (born 1961), screenwriter, film director, video artist
- Annemarie Schwarzenbach (1908–1942), German-language novelist, journalist, travel writer
- Monique Schwitter (born 1972), short story writer, playwright, actress
- Johanna Spyri (1827–1901), German-language children's writer, author of Heidi
- Laurence Suhner (born 1968), French-language comic and short-story writer since 1984

== U ==
- Regina Ullmann (1884–1961), German-language poet

== V ==
- Aline Valangin (1889–1986), novelist, short story writer
- Aglaja Veteranyi (1962–2002), German-language novelist
- Camille Vidart (1854–1930), women's rights activist, translated Heidi into French

== W ==
- Silja Walter (1919–2011), nun, German-language poet, religious writer

== Z ==
- Bertha Züricher (1869-1949), author, painter and engraver

== See also ==
- List of women writers
- List of German-language authors
- List of French-language authors
