= Schiller Prize =

Swiss literary award

The Schiller Prize was a Swiss literary award which was established in 1905 to promote Swiss literature and was awarded until 2012 when it was replaced as a national literary award by the Swiss Literature Awards.

The prize was awarded by the Schiller Foundation which awarded prizes each year to literary works by Swiss authors. The prize was in the amount of 10,000 francs. The Grand Prix Schiller of 30,000 francs was awarded less frequently. The Prix Schiller Découverte of 5,000 francs was awarded to new Swiss authors.

The Schiller Foundation continues to award the Prix Terra Nova to Swiss authors and translators.

== Grand Prix winners ==
- 1920 – Carl Spitteler (1845–1924)
- 1922 – Jakob Bosshart (1862–1924)
- 1923 – Philippe Godet (1850–1922)
- 1928 – Francesco Chiesa (1871–1973)
- 1930 – Jakob Schaffner (1875–1944)
- 1936 – Charles Ferdinand Ramuz (1878–1947)
- 1938 - Vinicio Salati (1908-1994)
- 1943 – Peider Lansel (1863–1943)
- 1948 – Meinrad Inglin (1893–1971)
- 1955 – Gonzague de Reynold (1880–1970)
- 1960 – Friedrich Dürrenmatt (1921–1990)
- 1973 – Max Frisch (1911–1991)
- 1982 – Denis de Rougemont (1906–1985)
- 1988 – Giorgio Orelli (1921–2013)
- 1992 – Hugo Loetscher (1929–2009)
- 1997 – Maurice Chappaz (1916–2009)
- 2000 – Grytzko Mascioni (1936–2003)
- 2005 – Erika Burkart (1922–2010)
- 2010 – Philippe Jaccottet (1925)
- 2012 – Giovanni Orelli (1928–2016) and Peter Bichsel (1935)

== Schiller Prize winners ==
- 1938 Maurice Zermatten
- 1938 Charles-François Landry Archived 2018-04-10 at the Wayback Machine, Contribution.
- 1939 Charles-François Landry Archived 2018-04-10 at the Wayback Machine for Diégo, Ed. Guilde du Livre, 1939
- 1942 Pericle Patocchi and Alice Rivaz
- 1943 Jean-Georges Lossier for Haute Cité, Ed. Kundig, 1943
- 1944 Charles-François Landry Archived 2018-04-10 at the Wayback Machine, Prix d'honneur.
- 1949 Charles-François Landry Archived 2018-04-10 at the Wayback Machine for Les Grelots de la mule, Ed. Eynard 1948 and Domitienne, Ed. Eynard, 1949.
- 1950 Georges Méautis
- 1951 Maria Lauber
- 1956 Maurice Zermatten
- 1957 Charles-François Landry Archived 2018-04-10 at the Wayback Machine for his literary work.
- 1960 Léon Savary, for all of his work.
- 1961 Jean Starobinski, Jean-Pierre Monnier
- 1963 Jacques Chessex
- 1964 Pierrette Micheloud for Valais de cœur, Ed. Monographic, 1964
- 1967 Jean Pache for Analogies, Ed. de la Baconnière, Neuchâtel, 1966
- 1969 Alexandre Voisard
- 1971 Georges Haldas
- 1974 S. Corinna Bille
- 1975 Anna Felder for La disdetta
- 1976 Jean-Claude Fontanet for L'Effritement
- 1977 Georges Haldas, Monique Laederach for J'habiterai mon nom
- 1978 Mireille Kuttel for La Malvivante Ed. L'âge d'homme
- 1978 Jean Pache for Le Corps morcelé, L'Age d'Homme, Lausanne, 1977
- 1979 Anne Cuneo for all of her work
- 1980 Pierrette Micheloud for Douce-amer, Ed. de la Baconnière, 1979, Jean-Pierre Monnier
- 1981 Marie-José Piguet for Jean Fantoche, portrait bouffon d'une auguste famille
- 1982 Anna Felder for Nozze alte
- 1983 Nicolas Bouvier for Le poisson-scorpion, Paris, Gallimard, 1982, Monique Laederach for La femme séparée
- 1984 Catherine Safonoff Au nord du Capitaine
- 1985 Hugo Loetscher
- 1987 Peter Bichsel, Laurence Verrey
- 1988 Amélie Plume for all of her work.
- 1989 Franz Böni
- 1992 Gisèle Ansorge for Les Tourterelles du Caire, Ed. Bernard Campiche, 1991
- 1995 Jean-Bernard Vuillème for Lucie and all of his work
- 1996 Yvette Z'Graggen for all of her work.
- 1998 Jean-Luc Benoziglio for Le feu au lac
- 1999 François Debluë for Figures de la patience, Moudon, Éditions Empreintes, 1998
- 2000 Fabio Pusterla for Pietra sangue, Milan, Marcos y Marcos, 1999. Monique Laederach for all of her work
- 2001 Jean-François Duval for Boston Blues, Paris, Phébus, 2000.
- 2002 Noëlle Revaz for Rapport aux bêtes, Paris, Gallimard, 2002.
- 2003 Benoît Damon for "le Passage du sableur", paris, L'Arpenteur, 2000.
- 2004 François Debluë for all of his work.
- 2005 Ágota Kristóf for all of her work.
- 2006 Jacques Probst for Huit monologues, Orbe, Bernard Campiche Éditeur, 2005.
- 2007 José-Flore Tappy for Hangars, Moudon, Éditions Empreintes, 2006
- 2008 Jean-François Haas for Dans la gueule de la baleine guerre, Éditions Seuil, 2007
- 2009 Pascale Kramer for L'implacable brutalité du réveil, Éditions Mercure de France, 2009
- 2011 Thomas Sandoz for Même en terre, Éditions d'autre part, 2010 / Grasset, 2012
- 2012 Nicolas Verdan for Le patient du docteur Hirschfeld, Éditions Bernard Campiche, 2011

== Découverte prize winners ==
- 2006 Catherine Lovey for L’homme interdit
- 2009 Dominique de Rivaz for Douchinka
- 2011 Douna Loup for L'embrasure, Paris, Mercure de France, 2010
