= Hughes Richard =

Swiss poet and writer (1934–2026)

- Born: 12 July 1934; Lamboing, Switzerland
- Died: 28 March 2026 (aged 91); Les Ponts-de-Martel, Switzerland
- Occupations: Poet; writer; bookseller; publisher
- Spouse: Gisèle Rumpe (m. 1983)
- Writing career
- Language: French

Hughes Richard (12 July 1934 – 28 March 2026) was a Swiss poet, writer, bookseller, and publisher. He wrote collections of poetry, as well as prose works and essays, mainly on Blaise Cendrars.

== Biography ==
Hughes Richard was the son of Hermann Richard, a paysan-horloger (farmer and watchmaker), and Marie-Blanche née Devaux. In 1983 he married Gisèle Rumpe, daughter of Ernst Friedrich Rumpe, a merchant. After attending the teachers' college (école normale) in Porrentruy from 1951 to 1953, he worked as a primary school teacher from 1956 to 1959.

He lived in Paris from the end of 1959 to 1975. Thanks to Georges Haldas, he became secretary of the Prix Rencontre and a collaborator of the publishing house of the same name. He then worked as a bookseller in Neuchâtel, and from 1985 as a bookseller from his home in Les Ponts-de-Martel. He was also a publisher, notably of his friend Francis Giauque. From the 1960s he wrote collections of poetry, as well as prose works and essays, mainly on Blaise Cendrars. He was a member of the Institut jurassien des sciences, des lettres et des arts, and he received various literary prizes, including that of the canton of Bern several times.

== Works ==
- Neiges, 1995
- Ici, 1998
- La saison haute, 1998
- L'or de Chasseral, 2003 (with a list of works)

== Bibliography ==
- Plans-Fixes (video), 1995
- Écriture, 53, 1999, 240–242
- La Radio suisse romande et le Jura 1950–2000, 2008, 52–53
