= Giauque =

Giauque is a surname. Notable people with the surname include:

- Francis Giauque (1934–1965), Swiss poet
- Jeffrey G. Giauque (fl. 1993), American diplomat
- William Giauque (1895–1982), Canadian-born American chemist and Nobel laureate
