= Lauber =

Lauber is a surname, and may refer to:

- Albert G. Lauber (born 1950), judge of the United States Tax Court
- Anne Lauber (born 1943), Canadian composer, conductor and music educator
- Dezső Lauber (1879–1966), Hungarian all-round sportsman and architect
- Friederike Lauber (1937–1996), Austrian table tennis player
- Ken Lauber (born 1941), American composer and musician
- Manfred Lauber of the duo Wolfgang Werlé and Manfred Lauber, German half-brothers convicted of murder
- Maria Lauber (1891–1973), Swiss writer
- Marius Lauber (born 1990), German musician
- Patricia Lauber (1924–2010), American author

== See also ==
- Lauber Arboretum in Kakabeka Falls, Ontario
