= Kama Sywor Kamanda =

Congolese writer

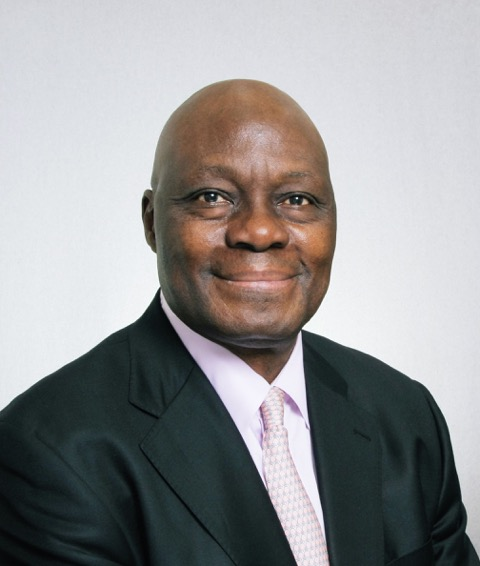
Kama Sywor Kamanda

Kama Sywor Kamanda(11 November 1952, Congo) is a Congolese French-speaking writer, poet, novelist, playwright, speaker, essayist and storyteller from the Democratic Republic of the Congo. He is also a committed intellectual who contributes to the evolution of ideas and the history of Africa. He was born in Luebo in the province of Kasaï Occidental in Congo-Kinshasa on 11 November 1952. His first publication, Les Contes des veillées africaines was an immediate success. From the beginning of his career, his literary work has stood out due to its originality, its unique style and its themes. As per literary critics: Kamanda owes much of his world renown as a writer to his "Kamanda Tales", as they should be called for their evocative power and literary quality, which rank this African writer among the greatest classic authors such as Andersen, Grimm, Perrault and Maupassant. Kama Sywor Kamanda is considered as the Africa's greatest storyteller.

== Biography ==
Kamanda Kama Sywor, a writer, poet, novelist, essayist, playwright and storyteller, was born on November 11, 1952, in Luebo, Democratic Republic of Congo, to father Malaba Kamenga and mother Kony Ngalula. His political view of this country forced him to leave Africa and live in exile in Europe. Nevertheless, he always remains a great leader of opinion in the world and his works are impregnated with his fight for liberty and justice and real democracy in his country. He has written many poetry books, drama, novels, essays and fairy tales. Kamanda is a classical writer in Europe, Asia, Africa and America. Many students in the world study his literature. He has earned many literature prizes, including the Heredia prize from the Académie Française. He is spoken of as a potential Nobel Prize laureate in Literature.

After publishing the first collection of stories at the age of 15, Kamanda studied literature, journalism, political science, philosophy and law, and worked in journalism. In 1970, he participated in the creation of the Union of Congolese Writers (Union des écrivains congolais). Forced to leave the Congo in 1977 due to his political activities, Kamanda lived in various European countries and currently living in Belgium.

In 1985, Kamanda was the founding president of the African Association of Writers, of which L. S. Senghor was the honorary president. As a poet, story teller and novelist, Kamanda subsequently produced a considerable body of literary work, including a dozen anthologies of poetry, several hundred stories, as well as several novels.

Kamanda's works have been translated into many languages, including English, Japanese, Italian, and Greek. This writer has earned several major prizes and distinctions, including the Paul Verlaine Prize from the Académie française (1987), the Louise Labé Prize (1990), the Black Africa Grand Prize for Literature (1991), and the Théophile Gautier prize (1993) from the Académie française.In 2005, the International Council for Francophone Studies (Conseil international d'études francophones) conferred upon him the prestigious Maurice-Cagnon Certificate of Honour, for his unique contribution to world francophone literature.

My poetry speaks of men and women from all continents who fight for a real and just humanism where their dreams can become reality. It's a poetry of life, of love, of hope and of the exaltation of values that encourage the blossoming of the individual within a community where harmony depends upon the contribution of each member.

— Kama Sywor Kamanda

His stories draw their imagery from African traditions, but constitute a universe at the boundary between the fantastic and the author's own reality. His numerous books of poetry focus on the themes of celebrating Africa and of the pain of exile and solitude, all against a backdrop of fervent celebration of love.

== Effects ==
=== Literary career ===
Through his writing, Kamanda combines personal memories, tradition, and creative elements. It is not just a collection of stories, but a specific literary work influenced by folk themes and local legends. As a playwright, storyteller, poet, and novelist, Kamanda has produced an extensive body of published work. Since the publication of his first book, Les Contes des veillées africaines, in 1967, he has written twelve books including a thousand poems, twelve plays, two essays, and several collections of stories. His literary work also includes several novels.

=== Storyteller ===
He is known for his literary tales which are inspired by his personal experiences, his imagination, and the traditions and realities of the African continent. Kamanda’s tales are stories imbued with the culture and civilization of all African lands. His literary talent has been universally recognized in his lifetime. Critics and some of the greatest poets of his time, including Mario Luzi and Léopold Sédar Senghor, have emphasised the power of his verses and the richness of his imagery. According to the Bulletin Critique du Livre Français (BCLF, No. 529, entry 150655, Jan. 1990): "The poetic cry of Kamanda touches us and overwhelms us all the more because it is truly poetic. The suffering of uprooted lives and dualisms, the quest for love and hope. Elegiac poetry where the plaint takes speech as a fertile source, to speak of the dry land, the indifference of the other, the dead end. But the most heartbreaking cries right through this African tradition take on the warm bright colors of childhood, of a past the exiled poet finds within himself. The jasmine, the wisteria, these "sweet children like the blackness of the ebony", explode with a savour for which we were unable to be guardians or lovers. The poet's struggle is so fundamental, the choice of his words so evident that they rank him among the greatest chanters of misery and compassion. Violent like Hugo, able to use litanies like Peguy, as lyrical as Eluard. His work takes on all forms of the universal clamor which, from the beginning to the end of time, talks continuously to the attentive ear.” Kamanda has received many awards, including, in 2009, the French Academy’s Prix Heredia for Œuvre poétique: édition intégrale i.e., the complete edition of his poetic works.

=== Novelist ===
Kamanda constantly embodies Africa and its dreams. His writings reveal him to be a genuine résistant against totalitarian powers, but he also comes to the aid of men and women fighting in silence for their rights or their survival, and that of their children. A committed writer, he has always considered himself a "lost soul between the dreams and the illusions, the joys and the sorrows of the African world." His novels depict the life of African peoples at the time of dictators and under the influence of racist and neo-colonialist sects, and the social and economic consequences of the black populations deprived of any financial clout to influence their own destiny. He highlights the contradictions of the black people of all continents who both serve exclusively the interests of their tormenters, over those in their own community that struggle for their rights and resist predation, and are victims of racist, ideological and religious issues that overwhelm them. L'Insondable destin des Hommes expresses a deep and original reflection on bad governance, political violence and economic predation as the main reasons for the migration of African youth condemned to death in the desert and at sea. In La Joueuse de Kora, he evokes his ideal of justice and truth and his quest for peace and collective happiness without racism or apartheid, while his characters and intrigues in La Traversée des mirages are inspired by the actors and realities of political life.

=== Playwright ===
Kamanda is inspired by Africa past and present, with playwriting that pays tribute African rulers like the Pharaohs and Queens of Ancient Egypt. Ramsès II, Candace 1ère, and Toutankhamon are Kama Sywor Kamanda plays that highlight Africa's contribution to world civilization. Kamanda travels the world, carrying his audience with him through his imagination, poetry and love of peoples and cultures of the world. Kamanda’s theatrical work is characterized by its originality, erudition, and exploration of African and global cultures.

Characteristics of His Theatre

African historical subjects: He draws inspiration from African history, giving new literary life to figures such as the pharaohs and queens of ancient Egypt.

Originality and erudition: His theatre is recognized for its thematic originality and the depth and richness of his knowledge of Africa, both past and present.

Universal dimension: Although rooted in African memory, his theatre, like the rest of his work, opens itself to the world and to other cultures, as demonstrated by his play set in Japan.

Quality of writing: He is also recognized for his mastery of metaphor and his poetic language, which permeate his plays as well as the rest of his work.

== Literary works ==
=== Tales ===
- 1967: Les Contes des veillées africaines, Éditions J.M. Bouchain, 1985, Editions l'Harmattan, 1986; Éditions Présence Africaine, 1998.
- 1988: Les Contes du griot, Vol. 1, Préface de Léopold Sedar Senghor, 220 pages, Éditions Présence Africaine (ISBN 2-7087-0600-4) second edition 1988.
- 1991: Les Contes du Griot, Vol. 2 (La Nuit des Griots), 302 pages, Éditions Présence africaine, 1996; new edition 1997. (ISBN 978-2708706262)."Grand Prix Littéraire de l'Afrique Noire" in 1991. Republished (ISBN 2-7087-0626-8) La Nuit des Griots, first edition in 1991, 288 pages - Antoine Degive, publisher and l'Harmattan, joint publisher (ISBN 2-7384-1144-4).
- 1998: Les Contes du Griot, Vol. 3 (Les Contes des veillées africaines, expanded edition), 199 pages, Éditions Présence Africaine (ISBN 2-7087-0664-0)
- 2000: Les Contes du crépuscule, 240 pages, Editions Présence Africaine, 2000 (ISBN 978-2708707153).
- 2003: Contes, illustrations de Louise Fritsch, 800 pages, (ISBN 2-913123-01-5) joint-publication: (ISBN 2-919885-50-2).
- 2004: Contes (complete works), 1,648 pages, (ISBN 2-913123-02-3).
- 2005: Les Contes du Griot: Les Contes des veillées africaines, pocket edition, 259 pages. Éditions Magnard, Collection: Classiques & Contemporains (ISBN 978-2210754829).
- 2006: Contes Africains, un choix de contes merveilleux 544 pages, Éditions Grund, (ISBN 978-2-7000-1465-5).
- 2018: Les Contes de KAMANDA (Choix des contes merveilleux)

=== Poetry ===
- 1986 : Chants de brumes, 148 pages, Preface by Jacques Izoard, 1986 (republished, Paris, in 1997, 2002 and 2019) (ISBN 978-613-9-51204-1)
- 1986: Les Résignations, 176 pages, Preface by Mateja Matevski, Paris (1997), republished 2019 (ISBN 978-613-9-51205-8)
- 1987: Éclipse d’étoiles,208 pages, Preface by Claude Michel Cluny, Paris (1997 and republished 2019 (ISBN 978-613-9-51208-9))
- 1989: La Somme du néant, Preface by Pierrette Micheloud, 132 pages, Paris, 1989 (ISBN 2-7384-0384-0), and 1999, and the definitive edition (2019) (ISBN 978-613-9-51260-7), Prix Louise Labé.
- 1992 : L’Exil des songes, 272 pages, Preface by Marc Alyn, Paris, and republished 2019 (ISBN 978-613-9-51261-4), Prix de poésie de l'Académie Française.
- 1992: Les Myriades des temps vécus, definitive edition, preface by Mario Luzi, 234 pages, Paris, 1992 (republished 1999), Prix Théophile Gautier de l'Académie Française in 1993, (ISBN 2-7384-7576-0), and republished 2019, 180 pages (ISBN 978-613-9-51262-1)
- 1993: Les Vents de l’épreuve,84 pages, Preface by Salah Stétié, Paris 1997 and republished 2019,(ISBN 978-613-9-512645)
- 1994: Quand dans l’âme les mers s’agitent, 192 pages, Preface by Jean-Baptiste Tati Loutard, Paris, 1998, republished 2019,(ISBN 978-613-9-512805)
- 1995: L'Étreinte des mots, 128 pages, Preface by Maria Luisa Spaziani, Paris, 1995 and republished 2019 (ISBN 978-613-9-512843)
- 1999: Œuvre poétique, 2016 pages, Éditions Présence Africaine (ISBN 2-7087-0693-4). 1999
- 2002: Le Sang des solitudes, republished 2019 (ISBN 978-613-9-512850).
- 2008 : Œuvre poétique complète, édition intégrale, 977 pages, Éditions L'Âge d'Homme, 2008 (ISBN 2825137820); Prix Heredia de l'Académie Française
- 2018: La transparence des ombres, 236 pages (ISBN 978-613-9-50890-7)
- 2019: L'Éternité des jours, 112 pages (ISBN 978-613-8-477792)

=== Novels ===
- 1994: Lointaines sont les rives du destin, 168 pages, 2019;republished, Eue, 2019 (ISBN 978-613-8-45960-6)
- 2006: La Traversée des mirages, 310 pages, 2019, republished, Éditions EUE (ISBN 978-613-8-45959-0) .
- 2006: La Joueuse de Kora, 131 pages, 2019, republished, Éditions EUE (ISBN 978-613-8-45955-2).
- 2013: L'Insondable destin des hommes, 368 pages, 2018, republished, Éditions EUE (ISBN 978-613-8-44980-5)

=== Dramas ===
- 2013: L'Homme torturé, monologue in one act, 52 pages, 2013, republished EUE, 2019 (ISBN 978-613-9-516056)
- 2015: Toutankhamon, tragedy, 300 pages, Paris, republished EUE, 2019,(ISBN 978-613-9-509683)
- 2015: Candace, historical drama, Paris, Florida (USA), 2015, 278 pages. Republished EUE, 2019 (ISBN 978-613-9-50967-6)
- 2016: Intrigantes entremetteuses, drama, 108 pages, Paris, 2016; republished, EUE, 2019 (ISBN 978-613-9-506071)
- 2016: On peut s'aimer sans se comprendre, comedy, 180 pages; republished EUE, 2019 (ISBN 978-613-9-506101)
- 2017: Ramses II, historical drama, 228 pages, Paris, 2017; republished EUE, 2019 (ISBN 978-613-9-51011-5).
- 2017: Akhenaton, historical drama, 196 pages, Paris, 2017, republished EUE, 2019 (ISBN 978-613-9-510078)
- 2017: La Reine Ranavalona III, historical drama, Paris, 2017; republished EUE, 2019 (ISBN 978-613-9-50582-1).
- 2019: Le Roi Béhanzin, historical drama, 115 pages, EUE, 2019 (ISBN 978-613-8-45596-7)
- 2019: Les Astuces du manipulateur, drama, 120 pages, EUE, 2019 (ISBN 978-613-8-491361)
- 2019: Le Pervers narcissique, comedy, 89 pages, EUE, 2019 (ISBN 978-613-8-49186-6)
- 2019: La Reine Nzinga Mbandi, historical drama, 139 pages, EUE, 2019 (ISBN 978-613-9-51175-4)
- 2019: " Théâtre complets", tome I, 620 pages (ISBN 978-613-9-515103), tome II, 620 pages (ISBN 978-613-9-516049), tome III, 644 pages (ISBN 978-613-9-516339)
- 2020: " Le Roi Muntuhotep ", historical drama,150 pages, EUE,2020 (ISBN 978-620-2-5458-46)
- 2020: " La Reine Néfertiti ", historical drama,153 pages, EUE,2020 (ISBN 978-620-2-545-839)
- 2020: " La tragédie du Roi Léopold II, historical drama,148 pages, EUE,2020, (ISBN 978-620-2-548-236)
- 2021 Lumumba, historical drama, (ISBN 9786203418019)
- 2022 Thoutmosis 3, historical drama, (ISBN 9786202544665)
- 2022 On attrape pas und lezard par la queue, comedy, (ISBN 9786138399278)
- 2022 Baketaton, historical drama, (ISBN 9786203439090)
- 2023 Khufu, alias Kheops, historical drama, (ISBN 9786206687269)
- 2023 Sethi I, historical drama, (ISBN 9786206696254)
- 2023 Les morts iront tous voter, comedy, (ISBN 9786206704638)
- 2024 Tiyi, historical drama, (ISBN 9786206731504)
- 2025 Les Dieux auto-proclamés ,(ISBN 979-8288106323)
- 2025 Imhotep, tragedy (ISBN 9782960377545)

=== Essays ===
- 2007: Au-delà de Dieu, au-delà des chimères, 58 pages, 2007, republished 2019, Éditions EUE (ISBN 978-613-9-508402)
- 2016: Vivre et aimer, 2016, 137 pages, Éditions Eue, 2018 (ISBN 978-613-8-43617-1)
- 2018: Évolution et révolution culturelle de l'Homme Noir, 141 pages, 2018, Éditions EUE (ISBN 978-613-8-44075-8)
- 2018: Les fondements de l'être, 148 pages, 2018, Éditions EUE (ISBN 978-613-8-44070-3)
- Je suis responsable de ma liberté (ISBN 978-620-6-73064-4)

=== Short stories ===
- 1993: Amertume, Diversité, Houghton Mifflin, Boston, U.S.A. (ISBN 0-395-90933-3)
- 1994: L'Ultime confession, Archipel, Anvers, Belgique
- 1994: L'Énigme, Le Non-dit, Belgique
- 1996: Le chagrin du danseur, Archipel, Anvers, Belgique
- 1996: Les gens du fleuve
- 2020: L'Angoisse des éphémères (((978-620-2-545-822)))

=== Complete works ===
- 2019: Complete Works, Tales, Volume I,700 pages (ISBN 978-613-9-506125) and Volume II, 700 pages (ISBN 978-3-639-52121-4)
- 2019: Complete Works, Novels, Volume I, (ISBN 978-613-9-507863), and Volume II, 2019, (ISBN 978-613-9-507870)
- 2019: Complete Works, Theater, Volume I, 620 pages (ISBN 978-613-9-515103); Volume II, 620 pages, 2019 (ISBN 978-613-9-516049); Volume III, 644 pages, 2019 (ISBN 978-613-9-516339).
- 2019: Complete Works, Poetry, Volumes I, 508 pages (ISBN 978-613-9-50892-1) II, 442 pages, (ISBN 978-613-9-50945-4) III, 428 pages,(ISBN 978-613-9-50981-2) and IV, 406 pages, 2019 (ISBN 978-613-9-50983-6)
- 2019: Complete Works, Essays, Volume one, 458 pages, EUE 2019, (ISBN 978-613-9-51489-2)

=== Translated works ===
- English: Love Beyond Reason, 2022 - English translation of On pet s'aimer sans se comprendre by Charitha Liyanage
- English : The tortured Man, 2023; - English translation of L'homme Torturé by Charitha Liyanage
- English: Wind Whispering Soul, 2001; Tales, 2001
- Italian: Le miriadi di tempi vissuti, 2004; La stretta delle parole, 2004
- Japanese: Les Contes du griot, t. I, 2000; t. II, 2005
- Corean : African fairy Tales from Kama Sywor KAMANDA, 2005
- Chinese: Les Contes du griot, t. I, 2003; t. II, 2004
- English: Fairy Tales by KAMANDA, Xaragua Editions CO, U.S.A., 2013
- English: Tales of KAMANDA (Volume1), Books of Africa, 2016.
- English: Amana "The child who was a God", Books of Africa, 2016.
- English: Prince Muntu, illustrated by Izumi ISHIKAWA, Books of Africa,2016
- English: Fairy Tales by Kama Sywor KAMANDA, (EUE), 2020 (ISBN 978-620-2-53297-6)

=== International recognition and awards ===
- 1987: Prix Paul Verlaine, Académie française
- 1990: Prix Louise-Labé
- 1991: Grand prix littéraire d'Afrique noire for La Nuit des griots.
- 1992: Poésiades special mention, Institut académique de Paris
- 1993: Jasmin d’Argent for poetic originality, Société Littéraire du Jasmin d’Argent
- 1994: Prix Théophile-Gautier, Académie française
- 1999: Melina Mercouri Award, Association of Greek Writers and Poets
- 2000: Poet of the millennium 2000, International Poets Academy, India
- 2000: Honorary citizen of Joal-Fadiouth, Senegal
- 2002: Grand Prize for Poetry, International Society of Greek Writers
- 2005: Top 100 writers in 2005, International Biographical Centre, Cambridge
- 2005: International Professional of the Year, 2005, International Biographical Centre, Cambridge
- 2005: Man of the Year 2005, American Biographical Institute
- 2005: Certificate of Honor for an exceptional contribution to francophonie, Certificat Maurice Cagnon, Conseil international d’études francophones
- 2005: Geuest Writer of Honour, EXPO 2005, Aichi, Japan.
- 2006: Master Diploma for Specialty Honors in Writing, World Academy of Letters, US
- 2006: International Peace Prize 2006, United Cultural Convention, US
- 2009: Prix Heredia, Académie française [bronze medal] for Œuvre poétique: édition intégrale.

=== Studies ===
- Marie-Claire De Coninck, Kama Kamanda: Au pays du Conte, Paris, Ed. L'Harmattan, 1993.
- Pierrette Sartin, Kama Kamanda, Poète de l'exil, Paris, Ed. L'Harmattan, 1994.
- Marc Alyn (préf.), Kama Kamanda, Hommage, 1997.
- Isabelle Cata et Franck Nyalendo, Kama Sywor Kamanda, Luxembourg, Ed. Paul Bauler, 2003.
- Marie-Madeleine Van Ruymbeke Stey (dir.), Regards critiques, Ed. L'Harmattan, 2007.
- Isabelle Cata :" La Quête du rêve d'absolu", recréer le monde, pénétrer l'infini, mesurer le néant;" Une réflexion critique sur l'oeuvre de Kama Sywor Kamanda.
- Sophie Davoine :Kama Sywor Kamanda: histoire d'une oeuvre, histoire d'une vie, entretiens, 100 pages, 2019,(ISBN 978-613-8-47063-2)
- Charitha Liyanage: The life and work of Kama Sywor Kamanda ,78 pages ,2020. (ISBN 979-8637211067) /dp/B0874L1599 The Life and Work of Kama Sywor Kamanda: Interviews Paperback

. Kheira Merine: Etude critique de l’œuvre romanesque de Kama Sywor Kamanda. L'Afrique au centre des débats,157 pages,édit.EUE, 2021, ISBN 978-613-9-50595-1.

- kama sywor kamanda et l'académie française, éditions du Soleil Levant.

== Quotes ==
"A free people is one that gives itself the means for financial independence to remain master of its destiny."

"To be optimistic is always to look where the sun is rising and not where it is setting."

"Self-censorship is a violation of integrity."

"To love is to discover happiness."

"Our most fruitful passion is to offer man wings that help to fly over the ordeals."

== Sources ==
- Cata, Isabelle, La Quête du rêve d'absolu: Recréer le monde, pénétrer l'infini, mesurer le néant, une réflexion critique sur l'oeuvre de Kama Sywor Kamanda, Paris, Edition Dagan, 2015.
- Cata, Isabelle; Nyalendo, Franck (2003). Kama Sywor Kamanda: chantre de la mémoire égyptienne. Paul Bauler. ISBN 978-2-919885-51-0.
- De Coninck, Marie-Claire (1993). Kama Kamanda: Au pays du Conte. Editions de L'Harmattan. ISBN 978-2-7384-2055-8.
- Kamanda, Kama Sywor (1998). Les Contes du griot, vol 1. Présence africaine.
- Kamanda, Kama Sywor (1992). Les myriades des temps vécus. L'Harmattan. ISBN 978-2-7384-1478-6.
- Mateso, Locha (1987). Anthologie de la poésie africaine. Hatier. ISBN 978-2-218-07941-2.
- Sartin, Pierrette (1994). Kama Kamanda, Poète de l'exil. L'Harmattan. ISBN 978-2-7384-2459-4.
- Sophie Davoine, Kama Sywor Kamanda, histoire d'une oeuvre, histoire d'une vie, entretiens, 100 pages, 2019, EUE.(ISBN 978-613-8-47063-2)
- Charitha Lyanage, the life and work of Kama Sywor Kamanda, 78 pages, 2020.(ISBN 979 863 721 1067).
