= Z'graggen =

Z'graggen or Zgraggen is a surname. Notable people with the surname include:

- Heidi Z’graggen (born 1966), Swiss political scientist and politician
- John Z'graggen (1932–2013), Swiss Catholic priest, linguist, and anthropologist
- Simone Zgraggen (born 1975), Swiss violinist and professor
- Yvette Z'Graggen (1920–2012), Swiss writer and translator
