= Fabio Pusterla =

Swiss translator and writer in Italian (born 1957)

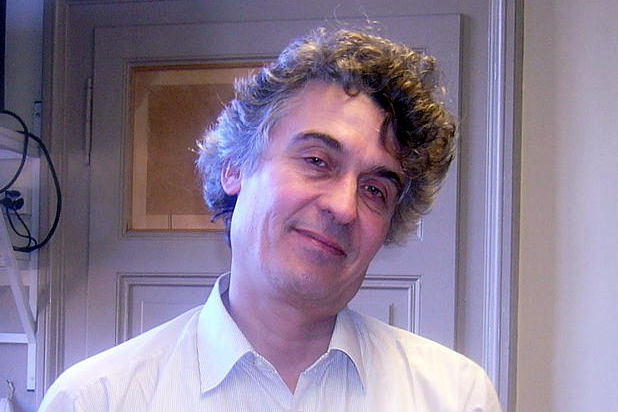
Fabio Pusterla

Fabio Pusterla (born 1957) is a Swiss translator, poet and writer.

== Life ==
Pusterla was born in 1957 in Mendrisio, Switzerland. He studied at the University of Pavia, where he graduated in Modern Literature. From 1988 to 1998 he was the editor of the journal Idra. He has translated into Italian the work of French poets such as Philippe Jaccottet, Antoine Emaz and Corinna Bille. Pusterla was the recipient of the Swiss Schiller Prize in 1986, 2000 and 2010 and has won the Gottfried Keller Preis in 2007. In 2008 he has collaborated with the artist Samoa Rèmy on the artist's book Sulle rive, tra le foglie, sui rami. He is a professor of modern literature and poetry at the Università della Svizzera italiana in Lugano and at the University of Geneva.

== Poetry ==
- Concessione all'inverno, Bellinzona, Casagrande, 1985 [2a ed. 2001] (Montale Prize and Schiller Prize).
- Bocksten, Milan, Marcos y Marcos, 1989 [2a ed. 2003].
- Le cose senza storia, Milan, Marcos y Marcos, 1994.
- Danza macabra, Faloppio, Lietocollelibri, 1995.
- Isla persa, Florence, Edizioni Il Salice, 1997, (2a ed. 1998).
- Pietra sangue, Milan, Marcos y Marcos, 1999.
- Me voici là dans le noir, Moudon, Editions Empreintes, 2001.
- Une voix pour le noir: poésies 1985–1999, Lausanne, Editions d'En bas, 2001.
- Les choses sans histoire – Le cose senza storia, Moudon, Editions Empreintes, 2002.
- Deux rives, with a preface by Béatrice de Jurquet, Le Chambon-sur-Lignon, Cheyne éditeur, 2002.
- Solange Zeit bleibt: Gedichte Italienisch und Deutsch with a postface by Massimo Raffaeli, Zurich, Limmat Verlag, 2002.
- Folla sommersa, Milan, Marco y Marcos, 2004.
- Movimenti sull'acqua, Faloppio, LietoColle Libri, 2004.
- Storie dell'armadillo, Milan, Quaderni di Orfeo, 2006.
- Le terre emerse. Poesie scelte 1985–2008, Turin, Einaudi, 2009.

== Essays ==
- Il nervo di Arnold e altre letture. Saggi e note sulla poesia contemporanea, Milan, Marcos y Marcos, 2007.
- Una goccia di splendore. Riflessioni sulla scuola, Bellinzona, Casagrande, 2008.

== Translations ==
- Philippe Jaccottet, Il Barbagianni.Einaudi, Turin, 1992.
- Nuno Júdice, Adagio, Sestante, Ripatransone, 1994.
- Philippe Jaccottet, Edera e calce, Centro studi Franco Scataglini, Ancona, 1995.
- Philippe Jaccottet, Libretto, Scheiwiller, Milan, 1995.
- Philippe Jaccottet, Paesaggio con figure assenti, A. Dadò/Coll. CH, Locarno, 1996.
- Philippe Jaccottet, Alla luce d'inverno. Pensieri sotto le nuvole, Marcos y Marcos, Milan, 1997.
- Nel pieno giorno dell'oscurità, antologia della poesia francese contemporanea, Milan, Marcos y Marcos, 2000.
- Corinna Bille, Cento piccole storie crudeli, Casagrande, Bellinzona, 2001.
- Philippe Jaccottet, E tuttavia. Note dal botro, Milan, Marcos y Marcos, 2006.
- Philippe Jaccottet, La ciotola di Morandi, Casagrande, Bellinzona, 2007.

== Bibliography ==
- Mattia Cavadini, Il poeta ammutolito. Letteratura senza io: un aspetto della postmodernità poetica. Philippe Jaccottet e Fabio Pusterla, Milano, Marcos y Marcos, 2004.
- Pietro De Marchi, Uno specchio di parole scritte. Da Parini a Pusterla, da Gozzi a Meneghello, Rimini, Cesati, 2003.
- Mathilde Vischer, La traduction, du style vers la poétique: Philippe Jaccottet et Fabio Pusterla en dialogue, Paris, Kimé Editions, 2009.
