= Giovanni Orelli =

Swiss poet and writer (1928–2016)

Giovanni Orelli (30 October 1928, in Bedretto, Switzerland – 3 December 2016, in Lugano) was a Swiss poet and writer who worked in Italian and the Ticinese dialect. His cousin Giorgio Orelli was a poet and literary critic.

== Life ==
He studied at the University of Zurich and the University of Milan, graduating in medieval and humanist philology. He spent much of his life in Lugano where - until he reached pension age - he was a teacher at the cantonal lyceum. His writing career began in 1965 with the novel L'anno della valanga, which won the Veillon Prize.

He won the Schiller Prize in 1972 with his novel La festa del ringraziamento. He won the Gottfried-Keller-Preis in 1997 for his complete oeuvre. He was also politically engaged, initially with the Independent Socialist Party, contributing to its weekly paper Politica nuova. He then moved to the Swiss Socialist Party and was elected for one term as a deputy to the Great Council for the Canton of Ticino - he was also elected to that role the four previous years but had been unable to take up his seat due to his teaching duties. On 17 May 2012, he and Peter Bichsel were joint winners of the Schiller Grand Prize, both for their complete oeuvre.

== Works ==
=== Prose ===
- L'anno della valanga, introduction by Vittorio Sereni, Milan, Arnoldo Mondadori Editore, 1965 (2ª ed. Bellinzona, Casagrande, 2003).
- Il giuoco del Monopoly, Milan, Mondadori, 1980.
- Un Orto sopra Pontechiasso, with 16 watercolours by Massimo Cavalli, Ed. Rovio, 1983.
- La festa del ringraziamento, Milan, Mondadori, 1972 (2ª ed. Bellinzona, Casagrande, 1991).
- Il sogno di Walacek, Rome, 66thand2nd, 2011. In passato Torino, Einaudi, 1991 (Solothurner Literaturtage, 1990).
- Il treno delle italiane, Rome, Donzelli, 1995.
- 1937-1997: 60 anni: sessantesimo HCAP, fotogr. di Pino Brioschi, Hockey Club Ambrì-Piotta, HCAP, 1996.
- Pane per Natale, with two chapters by Massimo Cavalli, Flussi, 1998.
- Di una sirena in Parlamento, Bellinzona, Casagrande, 1999.
- Farciámm da Punt a Punt: facezie dell'Alto Ticino, Bellinzona, Messaggi Brevi, 2000, ISBN 88-88179-00-3.
- Gli occhiali di Gionata Lerolieff, Rome, Donzelli, 2000, ISBN 88-7989-560-5.
- Da quaresime lontane, Bellinzona, Casagrande, 2006, ISBN 978-88-7713-454-7.
- Immensee, Bellinzona, Messaggi Brevi, 2008. ISBN 978-88-87278-89-7.
- I mirtilli del Moléson, Torino, Aragno, 2014. ISBN 978-88-8419-694-1.

=== Poetry ===
- Sant'Antoni dai padü: poesie in dialetto leventinese, All'Insegna del Pesce d'oro, Milano, Scheiwiller, 1986.
- Concertino per rane, Bellinzona, Casagrande, 1990 (2ª ed. 1993).
- Né timo né maggiorana, Milano, Marcos y Marcos, 1995.
- L'albero di Lutero, Milano, Marcos y Marcos, 1998.
- Quartine per Francesco, con una nota di Pietro De Marchi, Novara, Interlinea, 2004.
- Un eterno imperfetto, Milano, Garzanti, 2006.
- Un labirinto. Lugano, ADV alla chiara fonte. 2015. ISBN 978-88-7922-117-7.

== Bibliography ==
- Pietro De Marchi, Fabio Pusterla (ed.) : Sempre, senza misura. Omaggio a Giovanni Orelli. Bellinzona, Edizioni Sottoscala, 2013. ISBN 978-88-95471-17-4.
