= Yvette Z'Graggen =

Swiss writer and translator

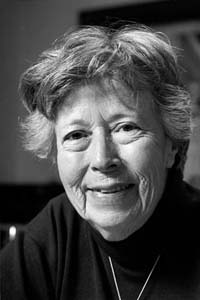
- Born: 31 March 1920
- Died: 16 April 2012 (aged 92)
- Occupations: Writer, translator

Yvette Z'Graggen (31 March 1920 - 16 April 2012) was a Swiss writer and translator.

== Early life and education ==
Yvette Z'Graggen was born in Geneva on 31 March 1920 to Alice (née Hekschohann) and Heinrich Z'Graggen. Her father was Swiss German and a dentist and her mother came from Vienna, with Hungarian ancestry. Her paternal grandfather came from the canton of Uri and had moved to Graubünden. Her parents spoke High German when she was young, her mother in memory of Vienna, her father because he preferred it to the Glarus dialect. After they decided to live in Geneva, French was spoken in the family. The family were part of the Protestant Geneva bourgeoisie. At the age of six, she invented the characters Mimi and Noémie, who were allowed to do things that Z'Graggen was not allowed to do.

She earned her high school Maturité in Geneva and then trained as a secretary. She also studied at the University of Florence.

During the Second World War, Z'Graggen worked for the International Red Cross from 1941 to 1946.

== Career ==
In 1939 she wrote her first book, L'Appel du rêve, which was published five years later in 1944 under the pseudonym Danièle Marnan. She wrote novels, autobiographical accounts, short stories and numerous radio plays.

She translated works from Italian and German. Some of her books have been translated into German, Italian, Hungarian and Romanian.

From 1949 to 1952, Z'Graggen she worked as a secretary at the Rencontres Internationales de Genève and at the European Cultural Society in Venice.

From 1952 to 1982, she produced cultural and literary programmes for Radio Suisse Romande. From 1982 to 1989, Z'Graggen worked at the Comédie de Genève theatre when it was under the direction of Benno Besson.

Her 1982 book, Les années silencieuses (The Years of Silence) dealt with the Swiss refugee policy of the war years and the shame of those who had not recognised their shortcomings. In Matthias Berg (1995) and Ciel d'Allemagne (Germany's Sky (1996) she considered the ambivalent feelings her generation harboured towards Germany. In Mémoire d'elles (1999) she used two letters discovered in her late mother's belongings to explore the life of her grandmother.

== Personal life ==
In 1953, she married Robert Brunel, with whom she had a daughter in 1963. The marriage ended in divorce in 1978.

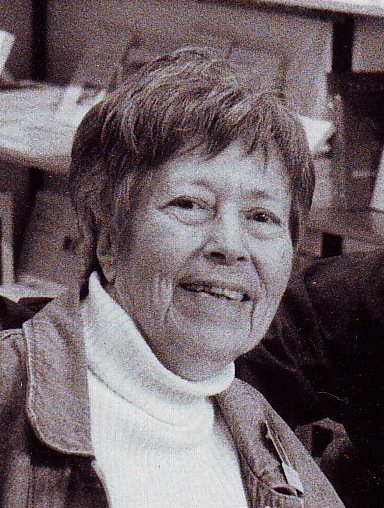
Yvette Z'Graggen in 2003

== Death and commemoration ==
Yvette Z'Graggen died on 16 April 2012 in Geneva at the age of 92, after a long illness. She was buried in the canton of Geneva.

In 2015–2016, Frédéric Gonseth made a film about Z'Graggen's life, Une femme au volant de sa vie, which was nominated for the Audience Award at the Journées de Soleure 2017 and released in cinemas later that year.

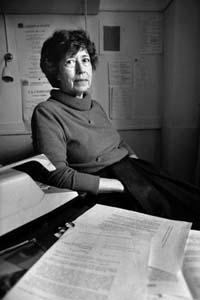
Yvette Z'Graggen photographed by Erling Mandelmann between 1982 and 1998.

== Works ==
- L'Appel du rêve (under the pseudonym Danièle Marnan), novel, Éditions Perret-Gentil, 1944
- La Vie attendait, novel, J.-H. Jeheber, 1944, Éditions de l'Aire, 1996
- L'Herbe d'octobre, novel, Jeheber, 1950, Éditions de L'Aire, 1989
- Le Filet de l'oiseleur, novel, Jeheber, 1957, Éditions de L'Aire, 1996
- Un Été sans histoire, novel, Éditions de la Baconnière, 1962, Éditions de L'Aire, 1987
- Chemins perdus, three short stories, Éditions L'Aire, 1971
- Un Temps de colère et d'amour, narrative, Éditions de L'Aire, 1980, 2004
- Les Années silencieuses, narrative, Éditions de L'Aire, 1982, 1998
- Cornelia, novel, Éditions de L'Aire, 1985, 2002
- Changer l'Oubli, story, Éditions de L'Aire, 1989, 2001
- Les Collines, [New ed.], short story, Éditions de L'Aire, 1991, 1997
- La Punta, novel, Éditions de L'Aire, 1992, 1995
- La Lézarde et autres nouvelles, Éditions de L'Aire, 1993, 2004
- La Preuve; Un long voyage, postf. by Sylviane Roche, Éditions Zoé, 1995
- Matthias Berg, novel, Éditions de L'Aire, 1995, 1999
- Ciel d'Allemagne, story, Éditions de L'Aire, 1996, 2000
- Quand la Vie n'attend plus, interviews, Éditions de L'Aire, 1997
- Mémoire d'elles, narrative, Éditions de L'Aire, 1999, 2006
- La Nuit n'est jamais complète, diary of the year 2000, Éditions de L'Aire, 2001
- Un Etang sous la glace, novel, Éditions de L'Aire, 2003
- Éclats de vie, Éditions de L'Aire, 2007
- Juste avant la pluie, Éditions de L'Aire, 2011

Translations from Italian

- Giorgio Orelli: Selected Poems, Éditions de L'Aire, 1973
- Claudio Nembrini: Le Secret de San Carpoforo, Zoé, 1990
- Angelo Casè: L'Espoir d'une vie meilleure, Éditions de L'Aire, 1994

Translations from German

- Max Frisch: Suisse sans armée? un palabre, Bernard Campiche (ed.), 1989
- Annemarie Schwarzenbach: La Vallée heureuse, Éditions de L'Aire/Le Griot, 1991
- Urs Richle: Mall ou la disparition des montagnes, Zoé, 1997
- Otto Steiger: La Patagonie peut-être, Éditions de L'Aire, 2000

== Awards ==
- 1981: prix Bibliomedia for Un temps de colère et d'amour, 1980, Éditions de L'Aire.
- 1982: prix de la Société genevoise des Écrivains for Les années silencieuses, Éditions de L'Aire, 1982.
- 1990: prix Pittard de l'Andelyn.
- 1993: prix des auditeurs de la Radio suisse romande for La Punta, Éditions de L'Aire, 1992.
- 1996: Schiller Prize.
- 1998: prix Rambert, special centenary prize.
- 2004: prix Lipp Suisse for Un étang sous la glace, Éditions de L'Aire 2003.
- 2012: prix Édouard-Rod posthumously for Juste avant la pluie, Éditions de L'Aire 2011.

== Archives ==
Archives littéraires suisses, Fonds: Yvette Z’Graggen. Bibliothèque nationale suisse. Laure Fallet, Marie-Thérèse Lathion. "Fonds Yvette Zgraggen: Inventaire". ead.nb.admin.ch (in French). Archives littéraires suisses.

== Bibliography ==
- Publications by and about Yvette Z'Graggen in the catalogue Helveticat of the Swiss National Library
- Vidéo : Yvette Z'Graggen en 1986. Elle évoque la place essentielle que l'écriture tient dans sa vie. Une archive de la Télévision suisse romande.
- Yvette Z'Graggen sur Culturactif
