= Francesco Chiesa =

Swiss writer

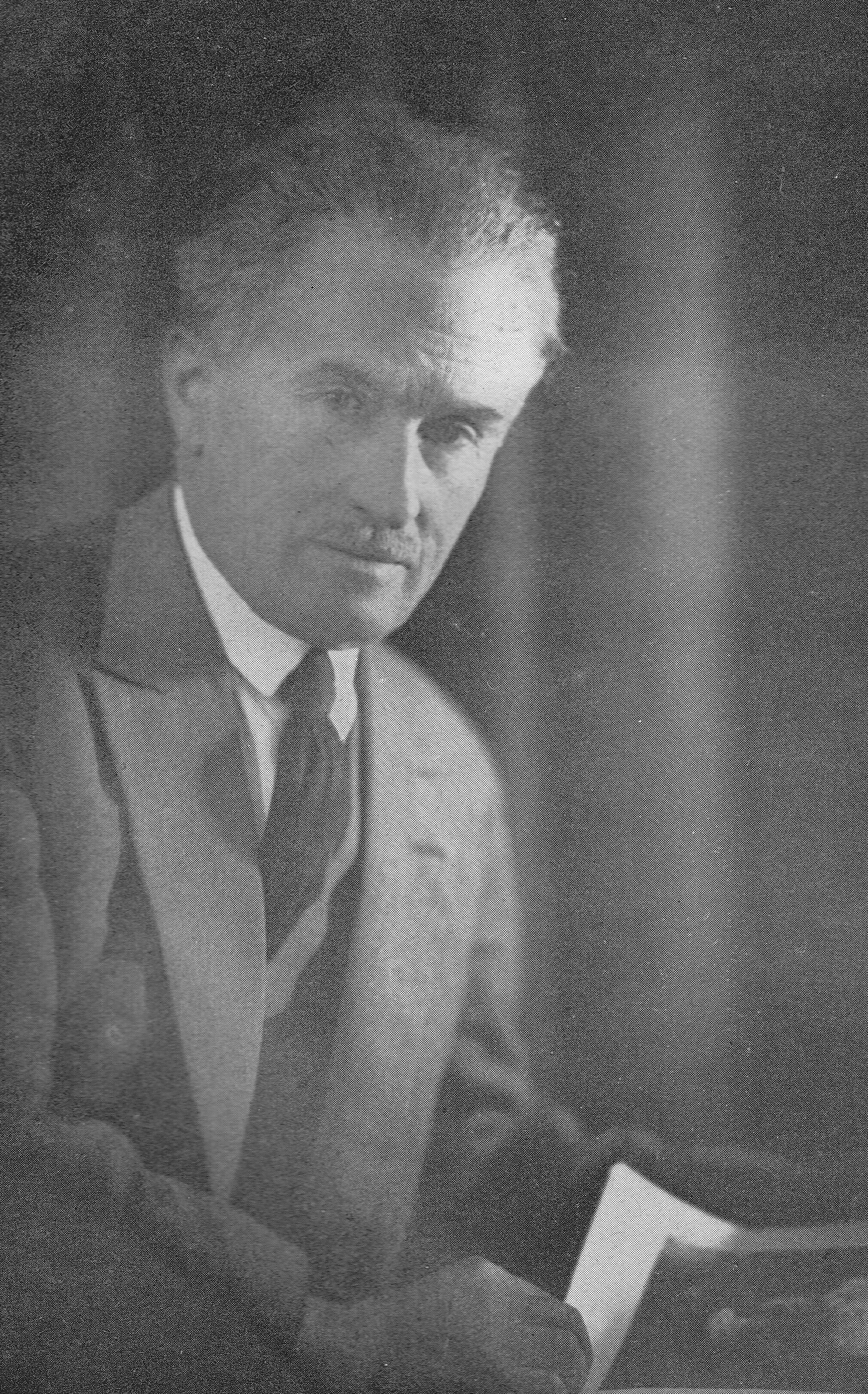
- Francesco Chiesa
- Born: July 5, 1871; Sagno, Switzerland
- Died: June 10, 1973 (aged 101); Lugano, Switzerland
- Occupations: Poet, writer

Francesco Chiesa (5 July 1871 in Sagno – 10 June 1973 in Lugano) was an Italian-speaking Swiss poet and short story writer. He was awarded the Grand Prix Schiller Prize in 1928.

== Works ==
- Bisbino, Bellinzona, Tipografia Eredi Carlo Colombi, Bellinzona 1893
- Preludio, Gedichte, F.Fontana, L.Mondaini, Milano 1897
- Lettere dalla repubblica dell'Iperbole, 1899
- La reggia, Baldini e Castoldi, Milano 1904
- Calliope, Sonette, Lugano, Egisto Cagnoni, Società editrice Avanguardia, 1907 (dt. Kalliope, St. Gallen 1959)
- I viali d'oro, Gedichte, A.F. Formiggini, Modena 1911, 1928
- Istorie e favole, Genova, Formiggini, 1913 (dt. Historien und Legenden, Zürich 1914)
- Blätter unter der Asche in Tagen lodernder Flammen, dt. Zürich 1915
- Poesie e prose, Zürich, Orell Fuessli, 1915
- Versetti, Tipografia Luganese Sanvito, Lugano 1918
- Fuochi di primavera, Gedichte, A.F. Formiggini, Roma 1919
- Consolazioni, Gedichte, N.Zanichelli, Bologna 1921
- Racconti puerili, Erzählungen, Milano, Treves, 1921 (dt. Bubengeschichten, München 1922)
- Tempo di marzo, Erzählung, Milano, Treves, 1925 (dt. Märzenwetter, Zürich 1927)
- L'altarino di stagno e altri racconti, Erzählungen, Milano, Treves, 1926
- Versi, Direzione della Nuova Antologia, Roma 1926
- Racconti del mio orto, Erzählungen, Nuova Antologia, Roma 1927
- Villadorna, Roman, Mondadori, Milano 1928 (dt. Villa dorna, Bern 1941)
- Compagni di viaggio, A. Mondadori, Milano 1931 (daraus dt. Zwei Novellen: Claudia. Don Achille, Zürich 1941)
- I romanzi che non scriverò, Nuova Antologia, Roma,1932
- La stellata sera, Gedichte, Mondadori, Milano 1933
- Scoperte nel mio mondo, A.Mondadori, Milano 1934
- Voci nella notte, A.Mondadori, Milano 1935
- Sant'Amarillide, Roman, A.Mondadori, Milano 1938 (dt. Sankt Amaryllis, Einsiedeln 1939)
- Passeggiate, A.Mondadori, Milano 1939
- Racconti del passato prossimo, Erzählungen, Mondadori, Milano 1941 (dt. Schicksal auf schmalen Wegen, Einsiedeln 1943)
- Sei racconti dinanzi al folclore, Erzählungen, Edizioni svizzere per la gioventù, Zürich 1941
- Io e i miei, Mondadori, Milano 1944
- Ricordi dell'età minore, Istituto Editoriale Ticinese, Bellinzona 1948
- mit Valerio Abbondio, Giuseppe Zoppi, Il diradarsi della nebbia, Tipografia luganese, Lugano 1950
- L'artefice malcontento, Gedichte, A. Mondadori, Milano 1950
- La zia Lucrezia, Società editrice internazionale, Torino 1956
- La scatola di pergamena, Ed. del Cantonetto, Lugano 1960
- Ricordi dell'età minore, Istituto Editoriale Ticinese, Bellinzona 1963
- Altri racconti, Erzählungen, Edizioni del Cantonetto, Lugano 1964
- Sonetti di San Silvestro, Scheiwiller, Milano 1971
- Tempo di marzo, Cantonetto, Lugano 1971
- Raduno a sera di pagine sparse, Mario Agliati (Hrsg.), Grassi, Istituto Editoriale Ticinese, Bellinzona 1972
- Tre noci in un cestello, Giulio Topi, Lugano 1972
- Lettere iperboliche, neue Auflage, Pierre Codiroli (Hrsg.), Armando Dadò, Locarno 1976
- Casi della vita: tre racconti, Pro Senectute Ticino, Lugano 1990.
