= Francis Giauque =

Swiss poet (1934–1965)

- Born: 31 March 1934; Prêles, Switzerland
- Died: 11 or 12 May 1965 (aged 31); Lake Neuchâtel, Switzerland
- Occupation: Poet
- Writing career
- Language: French

Francis Giauque (31 March 1934 – 11 or 12 May 1965) was a Swiss poet. He published two chapbooks, Parler seul (1959) and L'Ombre et la nuit (1962), and his friends Georges Haldas and Hughes Richard collected his poems and prose under the title Terre de dénuement (1968).

== Biography ==
Francis Giauque was the son of Max Giauque, a postman and postmaster in Prêles, and Laure née Tröhler. He was unmarried. He attended the progymnase (lower secondary school) in La Neuveville, and in 1958 he traveled to Spain. He worked in various trades connected with books in Lausanne, Geneva, and Neuchâtel, interrupted by stays in clinics. A poète maudit, he led a life full of suffering and inner struggle, which ended in suicide.

He published two chapbooks, Parler seul (1959), with a foreword by Hughes Richard, and L'Ombre et la nuit (1962). His friends Georges Haldas and Hughes Richard collected all his poems and prose under the title Terre de dénuement (1968), and also assembled a Journal d'enfer (1978; enlarged edition 1984). His work, marked by harsh violence, is devoted entirely to the darkness of existence; in his bare cry, Giauque sought to be the spokesman of the humiliated and the rebellious.

== Works ==
- Œuvres, 2005

== Bibliography ==
- P.-O. Walzer (ed.), Dictionnaire des littératures suisses, 1991, 310
- R. Francillon (ed.), Histoire de la littérature en Suisse romande, 3, 85–86
- Intervalles, 73, 2005
