= Yves Velan =

Swiss writer (1925–2017)

Yves Velan (29 August 1925 in Saint-Quentin, Aisne – 6 May 2017) was a Swiss writer from Bassins.

== Biography ==
He studied literature at Lausanne, where he joined the Society of Belles Lettres, and worked two years as a reader at the University of Florence. In 1950 he was one of the founders the leftist co-operative publishing house, Éditions Rencontre which published the literary magazine La revue Rencontre.

A communist, he was a member of the Swiss Party of Labour from the end of the war until 1957. He was forbidden to work and was excluded from teaching in the Canton of Vaud. He then moved to La Chaux-de-Fonds, Canton of Neuchâtel where he taught literature at the gymnasium until his retirement in 1991. In the late sixties he temporarily left the Neuchâtel Jura for a long stay in the United States where he taught French literature at the University of Illinois at Urbana–Champaign.

His first novel Je was published in 1959 in Paris. He also published two novels, La Statue de Condillac retouchée (1973), Soft Goulag (1977) and an essay, Contre-pouvoir, where he questions culture and its requirements. In addition to these books, there are numerous publications in reviews, an "essay-poem", Onir (1974), a tale, Le Chat muche (1986). Moreover, during the years 1950 to 1980, he had an important activity of criticism published in France, the United States and French-speaking Switzerland.

Yves Velan received the Grand Prix C. F. Ramuz and the literature prize of the canton of Neuchâtel for his work.

Velan died on 6 May 2017.

== Publications ==
- 1959: Je, Éditions du Seuil
- 1973: La Statue de Condillac retouchée, Seuil
- 1974: Onir, in Écriture 9, éditions Bertil Galland, Vevey
- 1977: Soft Goulag, éditions Bertil Galland, Vevey

== Bibliography ==
- Pascal Antonietti, Yves Velan, New York/Amsterdam, Rodopi, 2005
- Hadrien Buclin, Les intellectuels de gauche. Critique et consensus dans la Suisse d'après-guerre, Lausanne, Antipodes, 2019

== Sources ==
- Écrivain vaudois
- A contre temps, huitante textes vaudois de 1980 à 1380, p. 37
- Hadrien Buclin, Entre culture du consensus et critique sociale. Les intellectuels de gauche dans la Suisse de l'après-guerre (1945–1968), Thèse de doctorat, Université de Lausanne, 2015.
- Alain Nicollier, Henri-Charles Dahlem, Dictionnaire des écrivains suisses d'expression française, vol. 2, p. 874-877
- Histoire de la littérature en Suisse romande, under the dir. de R. Francillon, vol. 3, p. 445-456
- La Revue de Belles-Lettres, 1992, no 3-4 La machine Velan devoted to Yves Velan
