= Doris Jakubec =

Swiss professor (born 1939)

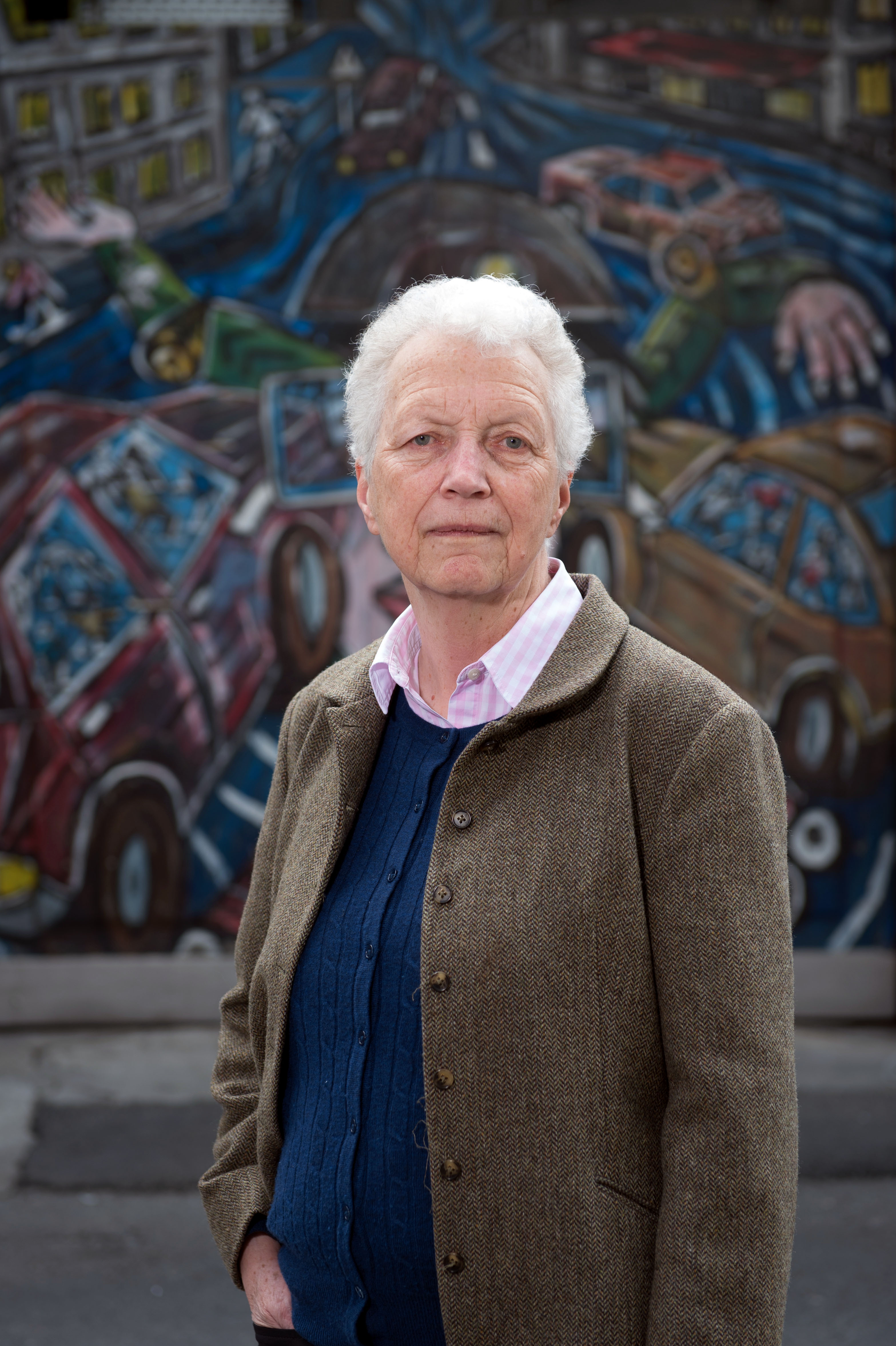
Doris Jakubec in 2014

Doris Jakubec-Vodoz (born 1939) is a francophone Swiss professor of Suisse romande literature. She served between 1981 and 2003 as director of the "Centre des littératures en Suisse romande" (CRLR / "Center for Swiss Francophone Literatures") at the University of Lausanne. She also has been or is a visiting professor at the Universities of Montréal, Stanford and Albuquerque, and has had international university lectureships at Tel Aviv and Peking Universities.

She is associated with the transformation in status of Swiss-French literature from a localised concern to an international research topic. Beyond the academic sphere she has come to wider public attention with her contributions to literary criticism in the general media.

== Biography ==
=== Provenance and early years ===
Doris Vodoz was born into a large family. She spent her early childhood growing up with her parents and five siblings at Vevey, on the north shore at the eastern end of Lake Geneva. During her later childhood the family lived at La Tour-de-Peilz, a fifteen-minute walk from Vevey along the route towards Montreux. Her father was a free church (Protestant) minister who encouraged in his children a spirit of independence and openness to the world. Her mother was a teacher. The decision by Doris Vodoz to study literature at a university level represented something of a break with family tradition. In 1964 she won a licence ès lettres degree qualification from the Faculty of Literature at the nearby University of Lausanne. Her degree dissertation concerned Fernand Chavannes, a little-known local author and dramaturge. associated with Charles-Ferdinand Ramuz.

=== Professional ===
Doris Jakubec launched her university career in 1965 as an assistant to Prof. Gilbert Guisan (1911-1980) at the university "Centre des littératures en Suisse romande" (CRLR / "Center for Swiss Francophone Literatures") which he set up that year. Under Guisan's supervision she produced a dissertation on the French poet Sylvain Pitt (1860-1919), who was a close friend of Charles-Albert Cingria and Paul Claudel. The dissertation was subsequently adapted for publication and emerged as a book. Under the direction of Gilbert Guisan the CRLR was launched with three principal areas of research: (1) the study of works and their sources, (2) the scientific publication of hitherto unpublished texts not necessarily intended for publication (correspondence, diaries, personal notebooks etc.) and (3) searching archives in the context of heritage research in order to inventorise and catalogue them in order to make them available to researchers.

Prof. Guissan died in 1980, and in 1981 Doris Jakubec took over at the CRLR. Under her direction it evolved into a more broadly based reference institute on French-language literature, while continuing to develop its core mission of conserving and improving access to original manuscripts and documents. Jakubec took particular care that the centre's facilities should be made available not just to Swiss scholars, but to researchers from all over the world. During her period in charge, reflecting the international political and economic trends of those times, there was an increase in interest by researchers from Japan, China, America, Russia, the Czech Republic, Romania, and Hungary. Her own passions include "genetic criticism" and a preference for original manuscripts, enabling researchers to study texts without the mediation of intervening generations of scholars.

Thanks to her work over several decades, the literature of the Suisse Romande has become a focus of university research and a repository for translation into a number of languages, most notably in North America, with the poetic works of Ellen Hinsey, the James Franck translations of Ramuz and the works on the Antilles and Africa from Elisabeth Mudimbe-Boyi.

Beyond poetry, which is her own primary research interest, Doris Jakubec makes a personal speciality of "genetic criticism"; this concludes the interrogation of any variants and forming conclusions as to what they reveal about the poetry and internal dynamic of texts as finalised. That is of particular relevance in the context of the "great project" which she launched in 1997, supported by a team of around a dozen researchers recruited for the purpose. This involves a new critical multi-volume edition of the works of Charles-Ferdinand Ramuz, including a great number of hitherto unpublished texts. The project is divided into two tranches. The first consists of the author's "romanesque works", and was first published in October 2005 as a two volume set in the Gallimard "Bibliothèque de la Pléiade" collection. The complete works, which follow, were published in 29 volumes by Éditions Slatkine, a specialist publisher based in Geneva. The last of the 29 volumes appeared in 2013. By this time Jakobec, now in her mid-70s, was no longer so much to the fore as the public face of the project. The project team of around a dozen researchers had become a team of around forty researchers and at least one report mentioned a total cost of around five million (Swiss) francs. Funding had come from a number of charitable foundations. The cantonal government of Vaud as well as the Swiss Federal (i.e. national) Office of Culture had also contributed.

She has been closely engaged with a new edition of the complete works of Charles-Albert Cingria published in the "L'Age d'Homme" series, mostly of the volumes devoted to "stories" ("récits"), published between 2011 and 2013.

Other important projects to which she had contributed include numerous re-issues of out-of-print novels by Guy de Pourtalès, such as "Nous, a qui rien n'appartient, voyage au pays Kmer" ("We who have nothing, journey to the land of the Khmer") and La Pêche miraculeuse ("The miraculaous peach"). She also gathered, edited and produced a three volume compilation of the correspondence of de Pourtalès between 1909 nd 1941, thereby bringing together in one research tool a number of important authors, essayists and critics from the interwar years.

=== Personal ===
In 1960, while still a student, Doris Vodoz married Joël Jakubec who has subsequently achieved a measure of prominence as an ecologist-theologian and author. Although he was born in Switzerland, Joël Jakubec's family roots track back to the central European region defined by twentieth century Czechoslovakia. Through her husband, Doris Jakubec discovered the breadth and richness of Czech literature, from the works of Jan Hus and Franz Kafka to those of Václav Havel. Czechoslovakia before 1945 retained many of the multi-cultural and multi-lingual characteristics of the old Austro-Hungarian Empire. Through her new-found insights into Czech literature she was able to identify many currents with which she was already familiar in the Romandy region of western Switzerland, notably with regard to the parallel evolutions of Protestant Christianity in a surrounding internationally Roman Catholic political context, but also with respect to minority cultures and languages. She would later pursue these themes with regard to the cultural situation in Quebec.

The couple's son David, born in 1968, is a psychiatrist and dramatist, based in Geneva.

== Awards and honours (selection) ==
- 2012 Cultural Prize of the Fondation Leenaards for literary criticism
- 2014 Prize of the University of Lausanne ("Prix de l'Université lors du Dies academicus")

== Publications (selection) ==
- Sylvain Pitt ou les avatars de la liberté: une vie à l'aube du XXe siècle, (1860-1919), 1979, Éditions universitaires
- Relectures d'Alexandre Vinet, avec Bernard Reymond, 1993, L'Age d'Homme, ISBN 978-2825104347
- Le bleu cavalier de la mort, 2009, Éditions Zoé, ISBN 978-2881826481
