= Amélie Plume =

Swiss writer (born 1943)

Amélie Plume (born 1943 in La Chaux-de-Fonds, Switzerland) is a Swiss writer. She won the Schiller Prize for her whole body of work in 1988. She also won the Pittard de l'Andelyn Prize om 1993 for Promenade avec Emile L. Her work has been described as comedic and herself as "a rare female burlesque writer". Some of her books have been translated into German.

== Biography ==
Plume was born in La Chaux-de-Fonds in Switzerland in 1943. Her father worked in German-speaking Switzerland and was often absent. She studied literature and ethnology at the Université de Neuchâtel.

Plume travelled to Africa, Israel and New York City where she taught French. She began to write in 1981. Returning to Switzerland, Plume opened a creative workshop for painting after having learned in Paris. She later devoted herself to writing. She has written more than a dozen novels, and has been described as a "rare female burlesque writer": "Amélie Plume's work is entirely devoted to comedy and self-mockery; at its core, however, is rebellion." Some of her works have been translated into German.

In 1993 Plume was awarded the Pittard de l'Andelyn Prize for Promenade avec Emile L, published by Zoe in 1992. Her most recent works are Les Fiancés du glacier Express, published in 2010, Tu n'es plus dans le coup, published in 2014, and Un Voile de Coton, published in 2018. In Un Voile de Coton, she revisits the Jura countryside and reflects on her relationship with her mother.

She divides her time between Geneva and Hyère.

== Writings ==
=== Novels ===
- Les Aventures de Plumette et de son premier amant : récit, préf. de Catherine Safonoff, Editions Zoé, 1981
- En bas, tout en bas dans la plaine, Editions Zoé, 1986
- Marie-Mélina s'en va, Editions Zoé, 1988
- La mort des forêts, ni plus ni moins, Editions Zoé, 1989
- Promenade avec Emile L., Editions Zoé, 1992
- Hélas nos chéris sont nos ennemis, Editions Zoé, 1995
- Ô qu'il est beau le jet d'eau, postf. de Doris Jakubec, Editions Zoé, 1995
- Oui Emile pour la vie, Editions Zoé, (1984) 1997
- Ailleurs c'est mieux qu'ici, Editions Zoé, (1998) 2003
- Toute une vie pour se déniaiser, Editions Zoé, 2003
- Chronique de la Côte des neiges, Editions Zoé, 2006
- Mademoiselle Petite au bord du Saint-Laurent, Editions Zoé, 2007

=== Plays and radiophonic parts ===
- Un mariage suisse
- Que souhaiter de plus? : pièce de théâtre en cinq tableaux, Editions Trois P'tits Tours, 2000

== Prizes ==
She received the Prix Schiller in 1988 for the totality of her work.

== Critical studies ==
- La langue et le politique : enquête auprès de quelques écrivains suisses de langue française, éd., conc. et préf. par Patrick Amstutz, postf. de Daniel Maggetti, Editions de L'Aire, Vevey, 2001. p. 140.
