= Casagrande =

Casagrande is a surname. Notable people with the surname include:

- Alan Casagrande de Moura (born 1987), Brazilian footballer
- Arthur Casagrande (1902–1981), Austrian-American civil engineer
- Caroline Casagrande (born 1976), American politician
- Dominique Casagrande (born 1971), French footballer
- Egidio Casagrande, Italian sculptor and metalworker
- Eloy Casagrande (born 1991), Brazilian drummer
- Francesco Casagrande (born 1970), Italian road racing cyclist
- Jaime Casagrande (died 2013), Brazilian footballer
- Joseph B. Casagrande (1915–1982), American anthropologist
- June Casagrande (born 1966), American writer on grammar and usage
- Marco Casagrande (born 1971), Finnish architect
- Maurizio Casagrande (born 1961), Italian actor and director
- Renato Casagrande (born 1960), Brazilian politician
- Walter Casagrande (born 1963), Brazilian footballer

== Fictional ==
The following characters from The Loud House's spinoff, The Casagrandes:

- Maria Santiago (née Casagrande), the mother of Ronnie Anne and Bobby
- Rosa Casagrande, the mother of Maria and Carlos and grandmother of Ronnie Anne, Bobby, Carlota, CJ, Carl and Carlitos
- Hector Casagrande, the father of Maria and Carlos and grandfather of Ronnie Anne, Bobby, Carlota, CJ, Carl and Carlitos
- Carlos Casagrande, the brother of Maria and father of Carlota, CJ, Carl and Carlitos
- Frida Casagrande, the wife of Carlos
- Carlota Casagrande, the daughter of Carlos and Frida, and sister of CJ, Carl and Carlitos
- CJ Casagrande, the brother of Carlota, Carl and Carlitos
- Carlino Casagrande, the brother of Carlota, CJ and Carlitos
- Carlitos Casagrande, the brother of Carlota, CJ and Carl

== See also ==
- 7356 Casagrande
- The Casagrandes, an American animated television series
- Stefano Casagranda (1973–2025), Italian racing cyclist
