= Maja Beutler =

Swiss writer (1936–2021)

- Born: 8 December 1936; Bern, Canton of Bern, Switzerland
- Died: 15 December 2021 (aged 85); Switzerland
- Occupation: Writer

Maja Beutler (nee Maroni; 8 December 1936 – 15 December 2021) was a Swiss writer who wrote in German. She published seven novels, three collections of short stories and three other collections of radio commentaries. She won four Bernese Book Prizes, a Schiller Prize and a Welti Prize.

== Career ==
Beutler was born in Bern on 8 December 1936, and was an only child. Her mother was German-Swiss and her father, who owned a printing press, was Italian-Austrian. She learned interpretation in Zurich, and studied in France, England and Italy, working as an interpreter for a food company and as a conference organizer at the United Nations Educational, Scientific and Cultural Organization (UNESCO) in Rome. Beutler returned to Bern to manager her father's printing shop in 1960, after he became ill. She married Urs Beutler, who had been a childhood friend, in 1961. They had three children together.

Beutler worked as a translator and was resident author for Stadttheater Bern in the mid-1980s. She had a long-running morning stories radio show on Schweizer Radio DRS, which introduced her to a wider audience. In total, her published work includes seven novels, three collections of short stories and three other collections of radio commentaries. Her first book was “Flissingen fehlt auf der Landkarte”. Her last book was published in 2013, and was titled “Ich lebe schon lange heute” (I have been alive for a long time today). She explained to an interviewer at the age of 80 that she still wrote, but only for herself. She was awarded four Bernese Book Prizes, a Schiller Prize and a Welti Prize for Drama.

Beutler died on 15 December 2021, at the age of 85.

== Works ==
- Flissingen fehlt auf der Karte. Geschichten. Zytglogge, Gümligen 1976
- Das Blaue Gesetz, Uraufführung 1979
- Der Traum, Ballettlibretto, Uraufführung 1980
- Fuss fassen. Roman. Zytglogge, Gümligen 1980
- Die Wortfalle. Roman. Benziger, Zürich 1983
- Das Marmelspiel, Uraufführung 1985
- Das Bildnis der Doña Quichotte. Erzählungen. Nagel & Kimche, Zürich 1989
- Lady Macbeth wäscht sich die Hände nicht mehr, Uraufführung 1994
- Die Stunde, da wir fliegen lernen. Roman. Nagel & Kimche, Zürich 1994
- Schwarzer Schnee. Erzählungen & Das Album der Signora. Zytglogge, Oberhofen 2009

== Prizes ==
- Buchpreis der Stadt Bern (1976/1980/1984)
- Preis der Schillerstiftung (1983)
- Welti-Preis für das Drama (1985)
- Literaturpreis der Stadt Bern (1988)
