= Pascale Kramer =

French writer and novelist

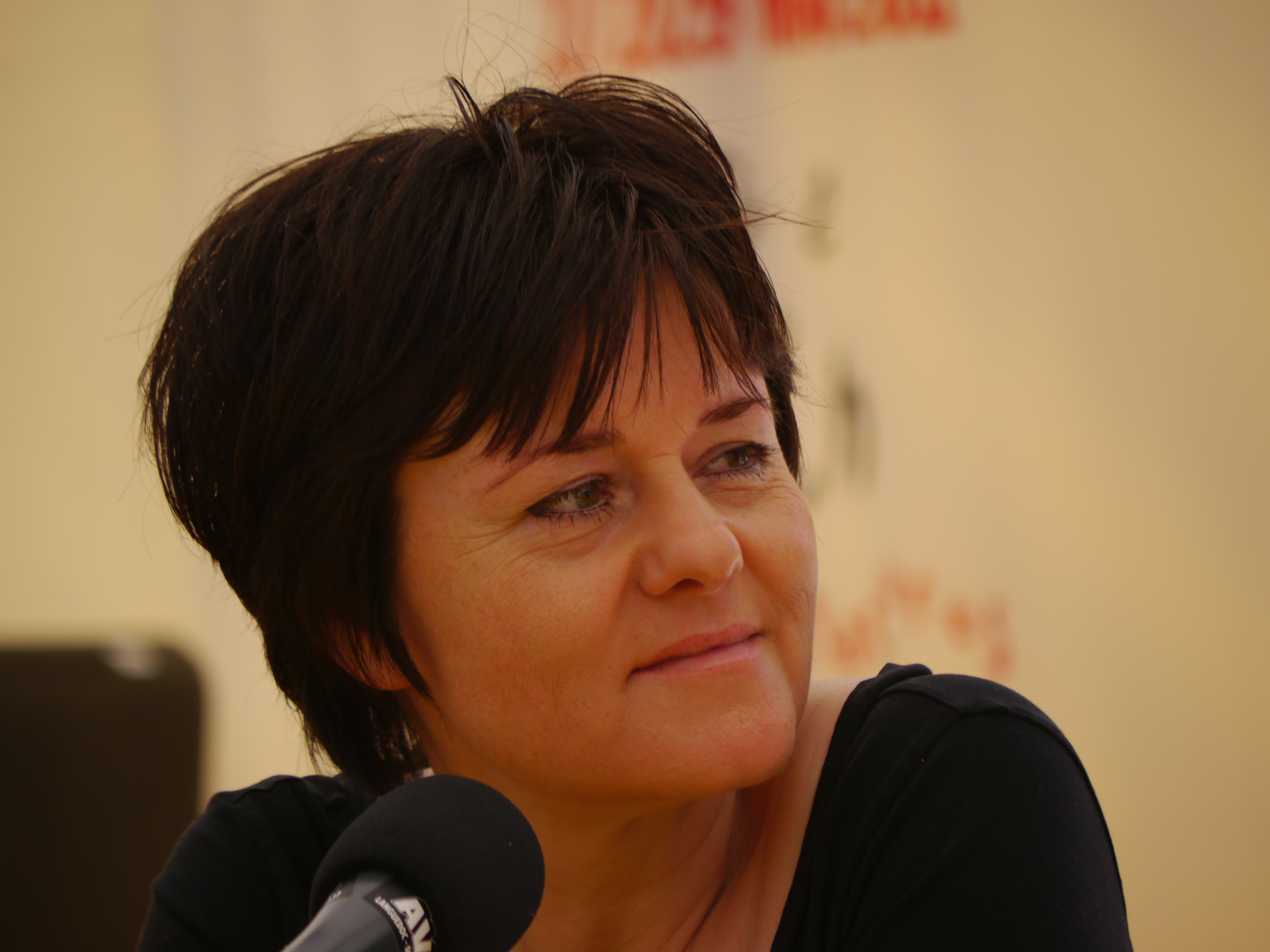
- Kramer in 2011
- Born: 15 December 1963 (age 62); Geneva, Switzerland
- Occupations: Author, poet

Pascale Kramer (born 15 December 1961) is a French writer and novelist.

== Education and early life ==
Kramer was born on 15 December 1961 in Geneva, Switzerland. Kramer's family moved to Lausanne in 1964. After obtaining her baccalaureat, she studied literature at the University of Lausanne, which she briefly interrupted with studies in journalism, eventually leaving Lausanne and moving to Zürich where she spent six years learning publicity with the Jacques Séguéla group. In 1987, while visiting Paris on business, Kramer chose to relocate there, working in advertising but also writing.

== Career ==
Kramer's first book was Variations on the Same Scene in 1982, followed by Terres Fécondes two years later. A ten-year hiatus followed, but she published Manu in 1996. This won the Michel-Dentan Prize.

Kramer is responsible for organising the documentary film festival Enfances Dans le Monde, the first exhibition of which was held in Paris on 20 November 2010. The day was chosen to mark the International Day of the Rights of the Child.

Kramer received the 2001 Lipp Prize for The Living, a tragic novel telling the story of two children who accidentally die in front of their uncle. Other works of Kramer's have won French awards, such as the Prix Rambert, the Grand Prix SGDL and the Schiller Prize. She also won the Swiss Grand Prix of Literature for her oeuvre.
