= Grand Prix C. F. Ramuz =

The Grand Prix C.F. Ramuz is a literary award presented every five years by the Foundation C.F. Ramuz to honour a writer's entire work. It has been awarded from 1955 until 2005. The foundation's stated goals are to:

- maintain the memory of Charles Ferdinand Ramuz, and keep his works alive.
- support the diffusion and the republication of the works of the writer.
- support critical translations and work, particularly through conferences.
- help with the creation of spectacles drawn from Ramuz's work.
- encourage French literary creation and Swiss writers of the French language

The foundation also presents a tri-annual Poetry Prize, the 'Prix de poésie'.

== Laureates of the great prize ==
The following have received the award:

- 1955: Pierre-Louis Matthey (1893-1970)
- 1960: Charles-François Landry (1909-1973)
- 1965: Marcel Raymond (1897-1981)
- 1970: Philippe Jaccottet (born 1925)
- 1975: Jacques Mercanton (1910-1996)
- 1980: Alice Rivaz (1901-1998)
- 1985: Georges Haldas (1917-2010)
- 1990: Yves Velan (1925-2017)
- 1995: Nicolas Bouvier (1929-1998)
- 2000: Anne-Lise Grobéty (1949-2010)
- 2005: Pierre Chappuis (born 1930)
- 2010: Jean-Luc Benoziglio (1941-2013)
- 2015: Catherine Safonoff (born 1939)
- 2020: Philippe Rahmy

== Laureates of the poetry prize ==
- 1983: José-Flore Tappy, for Errer mortelle
- 1986: Sylviane Dupuis, for Creuser la nuit
- 1992: Alain Rochat, for Fuir pour être celui qui ne fuit pas
- 1999: Claire Genoux, for Saisons du corps
- 2002: Caroline Schumacher, for Les Grandes Vacances
- 2007: Mary-Laure Zoss, for Le noir du ciel
- 2013: Claudine Gaetzi, for Rien qui se dise
- 2016: Pierrine Poget, for Fondations
