= Anna Felder =

Swiss writer and playwright (1937–2023)

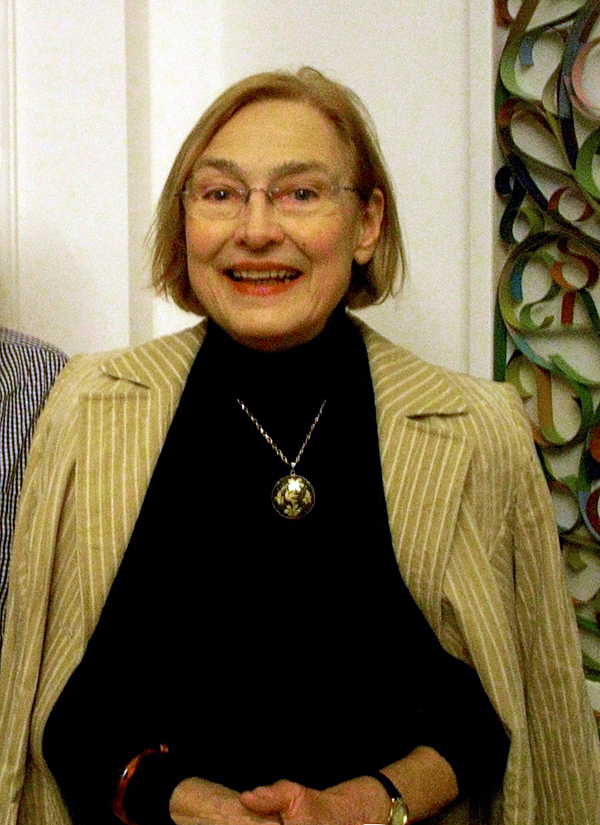
- Felder in 2009
- Born: 30 December 1937; Lugano, Ticino, Switzerland
- Died: 15 November 2023 (aged 85); Aarau, Aargau, Switzerland
- Occupation: Writer

Anna Felder (30 December 1937 – 15 November 2023) was a Swiss writer and playwright.

== Life and career ==
Born in Lugano, the daughter of a Swiss-German father and an Italian mother, Felder graduated in letters from the University of Zurich with a thesis about Eugenio Montale, to whom she was often paired in terms of style. She made her literary debut with the novel Tra dove piove e non piove ('Between where it rains and where it does not rain'), first serialised in the newspaper Neue Zürcher Zeitung in 1970 and then published as a book in 1972, which was based on her experiences as a teacher of Italian immigrants' children in Aarau. She wrote four novels, numerous short stories and several stage plays and radio dramas.

During her career, Felder received numerous awards and honours, notably two Schiller Prizes and a lifetime Swiss Literature Award. She died on 15 November 2023, at the age of 85.
