= Pierre Balthasar de Muralt =

Swiss typographer and publisher

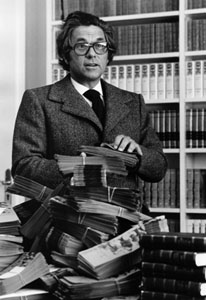
Pierre Balthasar de Muralt in 1973, photo by Erling Mandelmann

Pierre Balthasar de Muralt (1921, Vevey, – 24 March 2013, Vevey) was a Swiss typographer and publisher. He was responsible for developing Éditions Rencontre into one of the largest francophone book clubs in the world.

He was a descendant of the Sulzer family who founded Sulzer Ltd. in the nineteenth century. He completed his military service and gained a Law doctorate at the University of Lausanne before studying typographer in Paris. He collaborated with the Vaudois League, a political current influenced by the integral nationalism of Charles Maurras.
