= Janine Massard =

Swiss writer from the Vaud canton (born 1939)

Janine Massard (born November 13, 1939) is a Swiss writer from the Vaud canton. Massard has written novels, non-fiction and essays, and has received a number of prizes, including the Schiller Prize in 1986, for La petite monnaie des jours, and the Prix culturels vaudois for literature in 2007, the Edouard Rod Prize and the Bibliothèque pour Tous Prize.

== Life ==
Massard was born in Rolle to a working-class family, and began studies in literature at Lausanne, leaving after three semesters. From 2002 to 2009, she was president of the Association Films Plans-Fixes.

She married Maurice Ehinger; he died in 1994. From 1965 to 1969, she was a member of the Swiss Party of Labour, known as Parti ouvrier et populaire (POP) in Vaud.

Massard has written a number of novels, and often writes about working-class people and social misfits Massard was awarded the Schiller Prize in 1986, for La petite monnaie des jours, and received the Vaud Writers' Prize (Prix culturels vaudois) for literature in 2007 for Trois mariages (Three Marriages). What Remains of Katharina, published by Editions de l'Aire, won the Bibliothèque pour Tous Prize in 1998.

In 2002 she was awarded the Edouard Rod Prize for As if I Hadn't Crossed the Summer, which was her eighth novel. Her 2005 novel Le Jardin face à la France deals with daily life in a small town on the shores of Lake Geneva during the Second World War. In 2019 she published Grand-Mère et la mer.

Massard's essay on rural peasants and servants in the Jura region, Terre noire d'usine (Black Factory Land), has been described as "a major success".

== Selected works ==
- La petite monnaie des jours, novel (partly autobiographical) (1985), received the Prix Schiller in 1986
- Terre noire d'usine, non-fiction
- Trois mariages, non-fiction, won the Prix des Ecrivains vaudois
- Ce qui reste de Katharina, novel, received the Prix de la Bibliothèque pour Tous in 1998
- Comme si je n'avais pas traversé l'été, novel, received the Prix Edouard Rod in 2002
- Un Jardin face à la France, novel (2006)
- Childéric et Cathy sont dans un bateau, stories (2010)
- Gens du Lac, novel
