= Monique Laederach =

Swiss writer and translator (1938–2004)

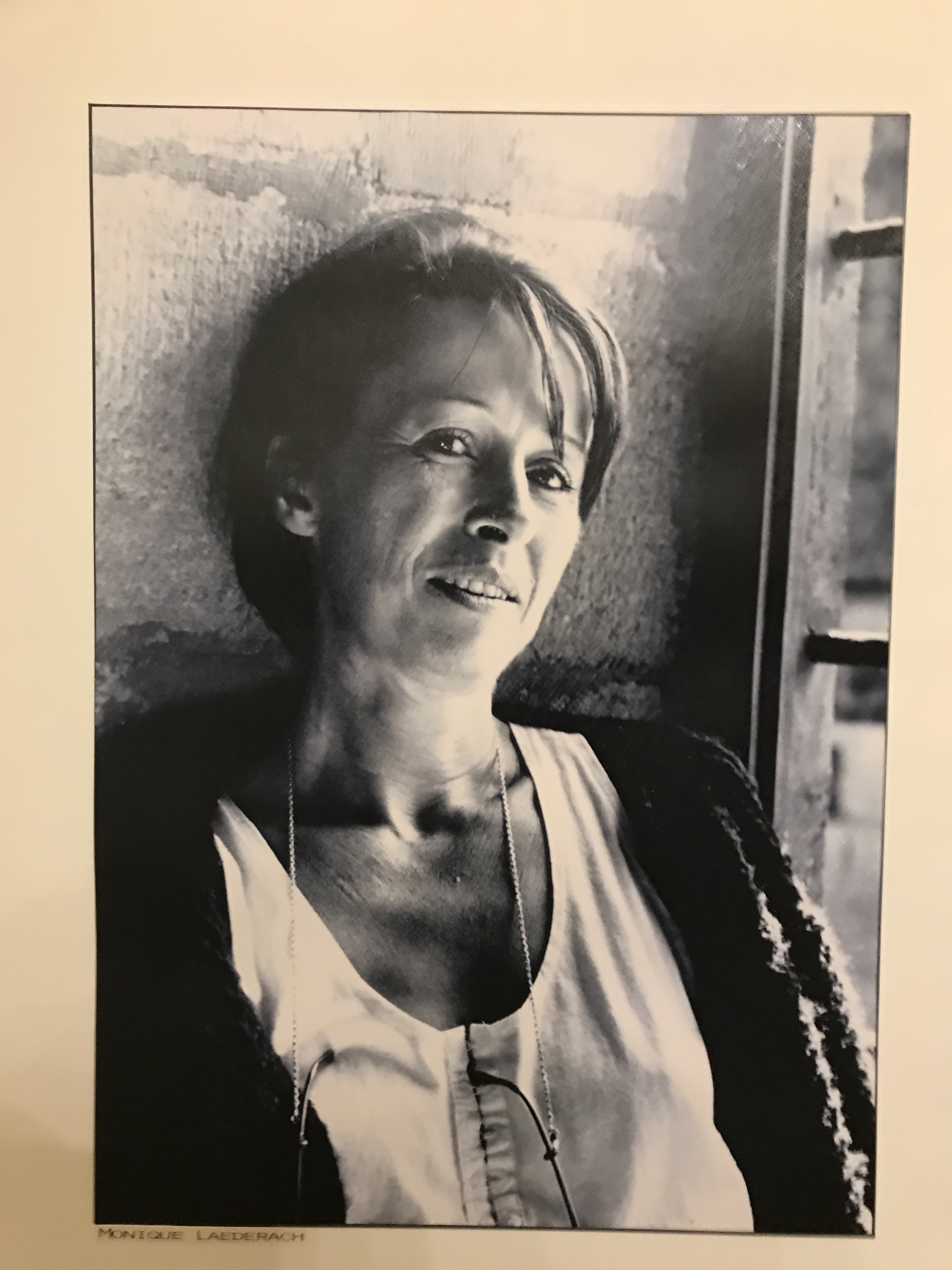
- Monique Laederach
- Born: 16 May 1938
- Died: 17 March 2004 (aged 65)
- Education: University of Lausanne, University of Neuchâtel
- Occupations: Writer, translator
- Writing career
- Language: French, German

Monique Laederach (16 May 1938 – 17 March 2004) was a Swiss writer and translator. She published poems, novels, radio plays, plays for the theatre and literary criticism. Laederach also translated works by German-language writers such as Kafka, Rilke, Erika Burkart and Adolf Muschg into French. Laederach was a member of the Gruppe Olten. A complete collection of her poems was published in 2003. She received the Schiller Prize in 1977, 1982 and 2000.

== Life ==
The daughter of Jean-Rodolphe Laederach and Hilde Maeder, Monique Laederach was born in Les Brenets on 16 May 1938. She studied music in Vienna, going on to pursue the study of literature at the University of Lausanne and the University of Neuchâtel, graduating in 1974. During this time, she also taught German. She published poems, novels, radio plays, plays for the theatre and literary criticism. Her first published work was a book of poetry, L'Etain la source, (Spring Pewter) which was published in 1970. Her first full novel was La femme séparée (The Separated Woman), in 1982, which "depicts a young woman searching for her identity".

Laederach also translated works by German-language writers such as Kafka, Rilke, Erika Burkart and Adolf Muschg into French.

From 1961 to 1973, she was married to the Swiss writer Jean-Pierre Monnier.

Laederach participated in literary conferences in Great Britain, Scandinavia, the United States, Canada and Mexico. She was a member of the Gruppe Olten.

A complete collection of her poems was published in 2003. She received the Schiller Prize in 1977, 1982 and 2000.

Laederach died in Peseux at the age of 65.

== Selected works ==
Laederach's work include:

- L'Etain la source, poetry (1970)
- Pénélope, poetry (1971)
- La femme séparée, novel (1982)
- Trop petits pour Dieu, novel (1986)
- Les noces de Cana, novel (1996)
- Je n'ai pas dansé dans l'île, novel (2000)
