= Genetic editing =

Genetic editing (French critique génétique; German genetische Kritik; Spanish crítica genética) is a scholarly approach to editing that focuses on tracing the creative process behind a work. Instead of treating a single manuscript as a finished product, genetic editing views it as part of a larger collection of drafts, notes, and revisions. An exemplar is seen as derived from a dossier of other manuscripts and events.

This approach seeks to reconstruct the sequence of actions and transformations that led to the final version, such as writing, erasing, cutting and pasting, annotating, quoting, or correcting. The derivation can be through physical cut and paste; writing or drawing in a variety of media; quotation, annotation or correction; acts of physical defacement; etc. When multiple manuscripts or media are involved, genetic editing aims to show how different elements were combined and how the text evolved through successive stages of creation. Genetic editing aims to reconstruct the sequence of actions on the manuscript and exactly which parts of the manuscript were acted upon where multiple manuscripts have been combined.

== Overview ==
While traditional scholarly editing typically involves comparing and synthesising multiple source documents to produce a new, authoritative edition of a work, genetic editing takes a different approach. It focuses on a single extant manuscript (or set of related drafts) and traces the development of each part of the text to uncover the creative process behind it. The term genetic is used by analogy with biological genetics to describe how each manuscript, or version of thereof, descends from earlier states to form an ordered tree, a branching lineage that represents a whole or partial family tree of textual evolution.

== Genetic editing models ==
Genetic editing is strong in European, particularly French and German, textual scholarship. The German genetic editing, which has been associated with synoptic telescoping, has a different method of presentation from the Anglo-American model. The primary model and test case of German editions has been Johann Wolfgang von Goethe. In England and the United States, it is William Shakespeare, who did not leave manuscripts of his works. Completed works of genetic editing are known as genetic editions. These documents are similar to documentary editions but it also include information detailing the different phases of writing and rewriting of the manuscript.

In France, genetic criticism, whose origins go back to the end of the 19th century in literature, remains a tool for studying the evolution of an artistic idea through its multiple versions and successive transformations. The study of modern manuscripts was established as a field of research at the Institut des Textes et Manuscrits Modernes (ITEM) at the CNRS in 1968. The project aimed to study the manuscripts of the poet Heinrich Heine that the Bibliothèque nationale de France had acquired a few years earlier. Researcher Louis Hay later marked this field by the use of the terms genetic criticism and genetic dossier.

The field of genetic criticism gained prominence among French literary scholars as a means of renewing the understanding of texts by shifting the focus from the finished work to the processes of writing. Academics argue that the definitive text of a literary creation is the result of progressive work involving research, conception, drafting, successive corrections and revisions. Adopting a perspective centred on literature, whether a poem or a novel, genetic analysis seeks to reconstruct the path of creation of a text, starting from the first notes or preliminary drafts through to the final version ready for publication. According to scholar Pierre‑Marc de Biasi, the initial work in textual genetics consists of gathering and studying a set of archive documents, then classifying them, analysing them, and deciphering them. This preparatory work is then extended by genetic criticism, which is responsible for interpreting the data from this first stage.

== Digital genetic editing and digital humanities ==
In the digital humanities, genetic editing has evolved through the use of digital tools and encoding standards that enable the representation and analysis of complex writing processes.

The Text Encoding Initiative provides specific XML guidelines for encoding genetic editions, allowing scholars to digitally record and visualise revisions, deletions, insertions, and other stages of textual development. This facilitates the creation of dynamic, interactive editions that reveal how a work evolved, rather than presenting only a single, finalised text. Projects using TEI for genetic editing combine philology, manuscript studies, and data modelling to document the full creative process in a machine-readable format.

In archival studies, the Beckett Digital Manuscript Project is an international collaborative initiative devoted to the manuscripts of Irish playwright and poet Samuel Beckett. It brings together digital facsimiles of his manuscripts, often scattered across many libraries, along with transcriptions and tools designed for genetic criticism (i.e., tracing the writing process from draft to finished text. It is organised in modules (one per major work or block of works) and pairs a digital-archive component with a print (or forthcoming print) volume that analyses the genesis of the text.

== Examples ==
- HyperNietzsche https://web.archive.org/web/20080706123702/http://www.hypernietzsche.org/
- Ulysses: A Critical and Synoptic Edition (1984; Gabler, Steppe, and Melchior) ISBN 0-8240-4375-8
- Transforming Middlemarch: A Genetic Edition of Andrew Davies' 1994 BBC Adaptation of George Eliot's Novel https://middlemarch.dmu.ac.uk
- The Beckett Digital Manuscript Project https://www.beckettarchive.org/
