= June Casagrande =

American writer

June Casagrande (born 1966) is an American writer who specializes in English grammar and language usage. She writes a syndicated column on language called "A Word Please", and is the author of five books; her 2018 The Joy of Syntax was described as "a succinct and mercifully lucid summing-up of the basics" of grammar by copy editor John McIntyre.

== Publications ==
- Grammar Snobs Are Great Big Meanies (2006)
- Mortal Syntax (2008)
- It Was the Best of Sentences, It Was the Worst of Sentences (2010)
- The Best Punctuation Book, Period (2014)
- The Joy of Syntax (2018)
