= Jaime Casagrande =

Brazilian footballer

Personal information
- Date of birth: 18 October 1949
- Place of birth: Urussanga, Brazil
- Date of death: 29 October 2013 (aged 64)
- Position: Defender

Senior career*
Years	Team	Apps	(Gls)
1973–1982	Figueirense		
- * Club domestic league appearances and goals

Jaime Casagrande (18 October 1949 – 29 October 2013) was a Brazilian professional footballer who made 430 appearances for Figueirense between 1973 and 1982. Born in Urussanga, he played for the club as a defender, making 430 appearances, the second highest in the club's history.
