= Edizioni Casagrande =

Edizioni Casagrande is an Italian-language publisher, founded in 1949 and based in Bellinzona in Switzerland. It focuses on the art and history of Italian Switzerland.

The Casagrande family first opened a bookshop in Bellinzona in 1924, which formed the foundation for the foundation of their publishing company. It published its first book in 1950 using a small printing press inside the bookshop which remained active until 1956, when they moved to 16 via Nocca in the same town. In 1976 Casagrande was one of the backers for the reorganisation of the Istituto Editoriale Ticinese.
