= Pierrette Micheloud =

Swiss writer and painter

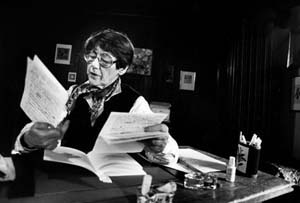
- Pierette Micheloud in 1984
- Born: 6 December 1915; Vex
- Died: 14 November 2007 (aged 91); Cully
- Occupation(s): Poet; Painter

Pierrette Micheloud (6 December 1915 – 14 November 2007) was a Swiss writer and a painter.

== Life ==
She was born in Romont and studied at Neuchâtel and Lausanne. She next spent some time in England perfecting her English, going on to study French literature and German at the University of Zurich and theology at the University of Lausanne. She lived in Paris from 1950, where she devoted herself primarily to writing poetry. She also contributed to the Swiss periodicals La Liberté, Gazette de Lausanne and Treize Etoiles and Les Nouvelles littéraires of Paris. During the 1970s, she was editor of the Paris literary magazine La voix des poètes. Micheloud also wrote a column on poetry for the weekly Construire.

During her time in Paris, there were more than ten major exhibits of her paintings.

Micheloud died in Cully at the age of 91. A foundation was created in her name to preserve and promote her work; it awards an annual prize for poetry in French.

== Awards ==
In 1964, with Edith Mora, she founded the Prix Louise-Labé; the jury for this award consists entirely of women. She received the:

- Prix Edgar Poe awarded by the Maison de poésie of Paris in 1972
- prize awarded by the canton of Valais in 2002

== Selected works ==
- Valais de coeur, poetry (1964), received the Prix Schiller
- Douce-amer, poetry (1980), received the Prix Schiller
- Les mots, la pierre, poetry (1984), received the Prix Guillaume Apollinaire
- L'ombre ardente, autobiography (1995)
- Poésie (2000), received the Grand Prix de poésie Charles Vildrac from the Société des gens de Lettres de France
- Du fuseau fileur de lin, poetry (2004)
- Nostalgie de l'innocence, autobiography (2006)
