= Georges Haldas =

Swiss writer and translator (1917–2010)

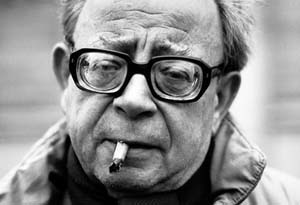
- Haldas in 1987
- Born: 14 August 1917; Geneva, Switzerland
- Died: 24 October 2010 (aged 93); Le Mont-sur-Lausanne, Switzerland
- Occupations: Writer; poet; translator
- Writing career
- Language: French
- Notable awards: Schiller Prize (1971, 1977); Grand Prix C. F. Ramuz (1985); Prix Edouard Rod (2004)

Georges Haldas (14 August 1917 – 24 October 2010) was a Swiss writer, poet, and translator. He published poetry from 1942, but it was his chronicles, such as Boulevard des Philosophes (1966), that brought him recognition from a wider public.

== Biography ==
Georges Haldas was the son of Léonidas Haldas, who was of Greek origin, from Cephalonia, and became an accountant after reversals of fortune, and of Marguerite née Monard, who was of Neuchâtel and Geneva origin. He took a licence ès lettres (arts degree) in Geneva. He worked as a private tutor, journalist, and bookseller, and for the publishers La Baconnière (Rencontres internationales de Genève) and Rencontre.

He translated Anacreon, Catullus, and Umberto Saba. He published poetry from 1942, but it was the chronicle (chronique) that brought him recognition from a wider public, with Boulevard des Philosophes (1966), La Maison en Calabre (1970), Chute de l'Etoile Absinthe (1972), and Chronique de la Rue Saint-Ours (1973). He also published numerous Carnets (diaries) and Légendes, thematic chronicles on subjects such as football, the cafés of Geneva, and meals, as well as countless literary and philosophical studies and screenplays for both film and television (in collaboration with Claude Goretta).

He received several literary prizes, including the Schiller Prize in 1971 and 1977, the Grand Prix C. F. Ramuz in 1985, and the Prix Edouard Rod in 2004. He died in Le Mont-sur-Lausanne in 2010.

== Bibliography ==
- A la rencontre de Georges Haldas, 1987
- R. Francillon (ed.), Histoire de la littérature en Suisse romande, 3, 333–341
