= Giorgio Orelli =

Swiss writer (1921–2013)

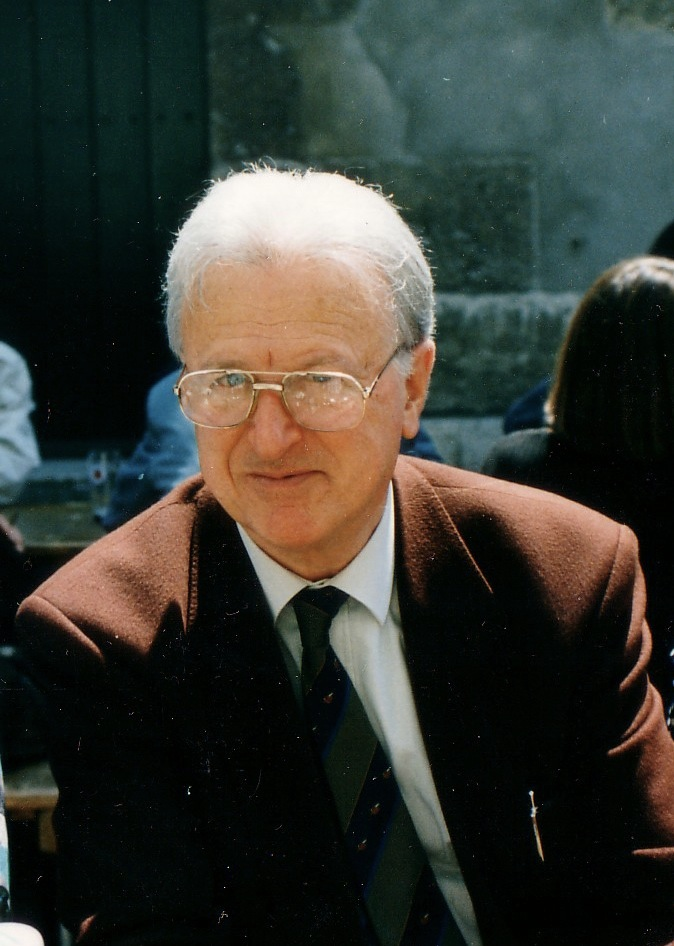
Giorgio Orelli in 1994

Giorgio Orelli (25 May 1921 – 10 November 2013) was an Italian-speaking Swiss poet, writer and translator.

He was born in Airolo in the canton of Ticino and was educated at the University of Fribourg, where he was a student of the Roman philologist Gianfranco Contini. He taught Italian Literature at the Higher School of Commerce in Bellinzona.

Giorgio Orelli was a post-hermetic poet. In the anthology of Piero Chiara and Luciano Erba, he appeared as a poet of the Fourth Generation. Called the Tuscan from Ticino by Gianfranco Contini, Orelli was often associated with the "Lombard Line" of "sober moral realism".

He was also known as a translator of Goethe and Andri Peer. He contributed to various literary magazines (Il Verri, Paragone, Letteratura). His cousin Giovanni Orelli was also a writer and poet.

Giorgio Orelli died in Bellinzona in 2013. He was the cousin of the writer Giovanni Orelli and the uncle of the alpine skier Michela Figini.

== Poetic works ==
- Né bianco né viola, Lugano, Collana di Lugano, 1944.
- Prima dell'anno nuovo, Bellinzona, Leins e Vescovi, 1952.
- Poesie, Milan, Edizioni della Meridiana, 1953.
- Nel cerchio familiare, Milan, Scheiwiller, 1960.
- L'ora del tempo, Milan, Arnoldo Mondadori Editore, 1962.
- 6 poesie, Milan, Scheiwiller, 1964.
- 5 poesie, con 5 seriografie di Madja Ruperti, San Nazzaro, Switzerland, Serigrafia San Nazzaro, 1973.
- Sinopie, Milan, Arnoldo Mondadori Editore, 1977.
- Spiracoli, Milan, Arnoldo Mondadori Editore, 1989.
- Il collo dell'anitra, Milan, Garzanti, 2001.

=== Poems translated in English ===
- by Lynne Lawner in Verse Daily, and Jean Garrigue, ed. Translations by American Poets, Ohio University Press, Ohio, 1970
- by Marco Sonzogni ,

== Prose ==
- Un giorno della vita, Milan, Lerici, 1960.
- Pomeriggio bellinzonese in Luci e figure di Bellinzona negli acquerelli di William Turner e nelle pagine di Giorgio Orelli, a cura di Virgilio Gilardoni, Bellinzona, Casagrande, 1978.

== Translations ==
- Johann Wolfgang Goethe, Poesie scelte, Milan, Arnoldo Mondadori Editore, 1974.

== Essays ==
- Accertamenti verbali, Milan, Bompiani, 1978.
- Quel ramo del lago di Como, Bellinzona, Casagrande, 1982 e 1990.
- Accertamenti montaliani, Bologna, Il Mulino, 1984.
- Il suono dei sospiri, Turin, Einaudi, 1990.
- Foscolo e la danzatrice, Parma, Pratiche, 1992.
- La qualità del senso. Dante, Ariosto e Leopardi, Bellinzona, Casagrande, 2012.

== Awards ==
- 1944 Premio Lugano
- 1960 Premio Città di Firenze, Premio Libera Stampa
- 1979 Honorary Degree, University of Fribourg
- 1988 Grand Prix Schiller of the Swiss Schiller Foundation
- 1997 UBS Culture Foundation
- 2001 Premio Piero Chiara
- 2002 Bagutta Prize
- 2008 BSI Award
