= Jean-Luc Benoziglio =

Swiss writer and publishing editor

- Born: Jean-Luc Benoziglio; 19 November 1941; Monthey, Valais, Switzerland
- Died: 5 December 2013 (aged 72); Paris, France
- Education: University of Lausanne (dropped out)
- Occupations: Writer, publishing editor
- Years active: 1972–2005

Jean-Luc Benoziglio (19 November 1941 – 5 December 2013) was a Swiss-French writer and publishing editor.

He was born in Monthey, Valais, on 19 November 1941. His father, Nissim Beno, was a Jewish psychiatrist who had emigrated from Turkey; his mother was an Italian and a strict Catholic. The Holocaust was a recurrent concern of his writing.

Benoziglio studied law at the University of Lausanne but dropped out before completing his degree, and moved to Paris where he remained for most of his life. His first avant-garde novels, produced 1972–8, were popular only within a small circle. His sixth novel, Cabinet-portrait, published in 1980, had a more mainstream style and received more widespread attention, as well as being awarded the Prix Médicis. In 2010, he was awarded the Grand Prix C. F. Ramuz, honouring his lifetime of work.

His work is characterised by black humor and the influence of the Nouveau roman and Oulipo.

Jean-Luc Benoziglio died on 5 December 2013, aged 72, in Paris, France, where he had lived since 1967.

== Bibliography ==
- 1972 – Quelqu'un bis est mort
- 1973 – Le Midship
- 1974 – La Boîte noire
- 1976 – Béno s'en va-t-en guerre
- 1978 – L'Écrivain fantôme
- 1980 – Cabinet-portrait (Prix Médicis 1980)
- 1986 – Le Jour où naquit Kary Karinaky
- 1989 – Tableaux d'une ex
- 1991 – La Pyramide ronde
- 1993 – Peinture avec pistolet
- 1998 – Le Feu au lac
- 1999 – Peinture avec pistolet
- 2001 – La Pyramide ronde
- 2004 – La Voix des mauvais jours et des chagrins rentrés
- 2005 – Louis Capet, suite et fin
