= Maria Lauber =

Swiss writer (1891–1973)

- Born: 25 August 1891; Frutigen, Switzerland
- Died: 4 July 1973 (aged 81); Frutigen, Switzerland
- Occupations: Writer, poet
- Writing career
- Language: German, Swiss German
- Notable awards: Schiller Prize (1951)

Maria Lauber (25 August 1891 – 4 July 1973) was a Swiss writer, who published both in Standard German and in the local dialect of Swiss German (specifically "Frutigtütsch", a form of Highest Alemannic). She published folklore, autobiographical stories and poems, and was awarded the 1951 Schiller Prize, and the 1966 Literary Prize of the Canton of Bern. She was made an honorary citizen of Frutigen.

== Life and work ==
Born in Frutigen, in the Berner Oberland, on 25th August 1891, her parents were Johannes and Rosina Susanna, née Grossen. Lauber trained as a teacher at the Monbijou Teacher Training College in Bern, finishing in 1910. She also later had training at the University of Bern, in 1917. From 1910, Lauber worked as a primary and lower school teacher in Adelboden, Lenk and Kiental before retiring in 1952 for health reasons.

Lauber's early work was mainly natural history and folklore written in Standard German, but she later published increasing numbers of stories, autobiographical narratives and poems in the Swiss German dialect of the Frutigtal valley, which runs along the river Kander. She joined the Bernese Writers' Association in 1942.

In 1966, she was appointed an honorary citizen of Frutigen by the parish council. She is buried in the Frutigen cemetery, where her grave has been given a place of honour.

Since 1993 her literary estate has been owned by the Frutigland Cultural Heritage Foundation. A biography of Lauber was published by Altels Verlag in 1993, Maria Lauber: (1891–1973): eine Lebensbeschreibung, written by Erich Blatter.

== Awards and prizes ==
- 1951 Schiller Prize (for Chüngold)
- 1966 Literary Prize of the Canton of Bern
- 1966 honorary citizen of Frutigen

== Selected bibliography ==
- Alpen-Legendchen, 1920
- D' Wyberschlacht uf de Langermatte. Ein Schauspiel aus der Zeit der Sage in 3 Akten, 1922
- Wa Grossatt nug het gläbt. Skizzen über das Brauchtum der Talschaft Frutigen in ihrer Mundart dargestellt, 1939
- Eghi Brügg: Gschichti us em innere Frutigtal, 1942
- Hab Sorg derzue. Sagen aus der Talschaft Frutigen nach mündlicher Ueberlieferung, 1940
- Chüngold (Erzählung), 1950
- Chüngold in der Stadt (Erzählung), 1954
- Mis Tal (Gedichte), 1955
- Bletter im Luft (Gedichte), 1959
- Unter dem gekrönten Adler. Die Talschaft Frutigen, 1961
