= Erling Mandelmann =

Danish photographer

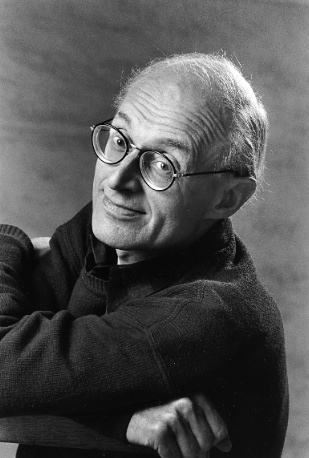
Erling Mandelmann

Erling Mandelmann (18 November 1935 – 14 January 2018) was a Danish photographer. He began his career as a freelance photojournalist in the mid-1960s.

== Biography ==
Mandelmann worked for 40 years as a freelance photojournalist and portrait photographer for a number of Swiss and European publications, as well as for various international organizations such as the World Health Organization, International Labour Organization, the United Nations, and Amnesty International.

He took more than 500 portraits of people, including the 14th Dalai Lama, Noël Coward, Gertrude Fehr, Nina Hagen, Johnny Hallyday, and Prince Hans-Adam of Liechtenstein. His photo-archives have been deposited at the Historical Museum of Lausanne.

Mandelmann died on 14 January 2018 at the age of 82.

== Gallery ==
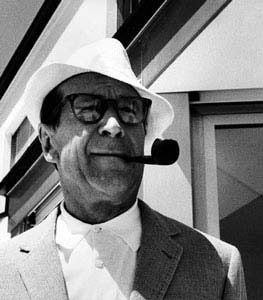
Georges Simenon (1963)

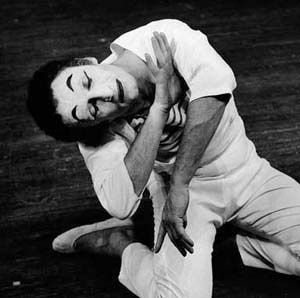
Marcel Marceau (1963)

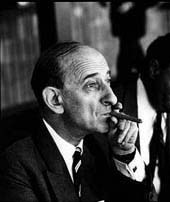
Raymond Aron (1966)

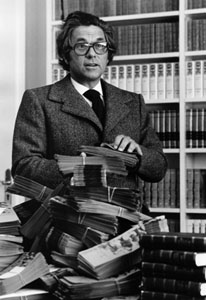
Pierre Balthasar de Muralt (1973)

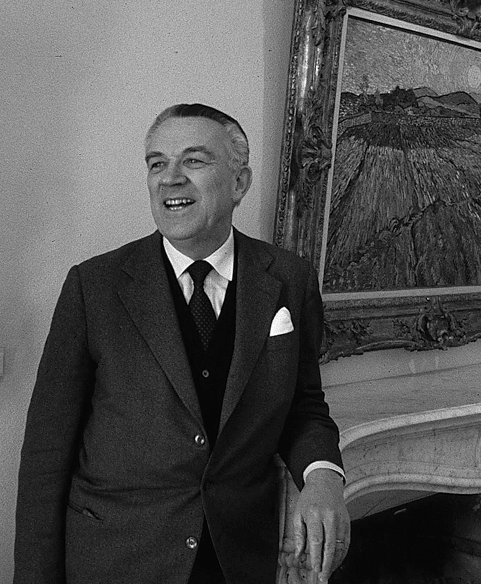
François Daulte (1985)

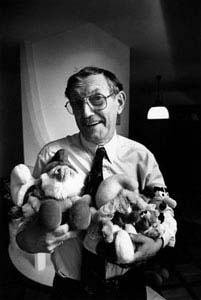
Peyo (1990)

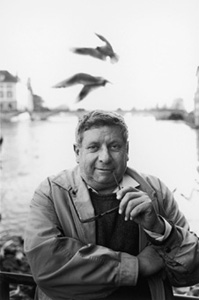
Hugo Loetscher (1993)

== Bibliography ==
- Miroir et Mémoire (Galeries Pilotes/René Berger), Musée des Beaux Arts, Lausanne, 1964
- Aus einem Mailänder Friedhof, the magazine DU (CH), 1967
- Aspects"- "5 ans d'activités autour du collectioneur Th. Ahrenberg. Artists Portraits /exhibition catalogue (CH), 1967
- Un atelier de boîtes à vacherin dans la Vallée de Joux, Krebs, Basel 1971
- Der Störschuhmacher im Lötschental, Krebs, Basel, 1972
- Hirtenleben und Hirtenkultur im Waadtländer Jura, Krebs, Basel, 1972
- Spiegel und Spiegelmacher, Krebs, Basel, 1973
- Die Wallfahrt von Hornussen nach Todtmoos, Katholische Kirchgemeinde, Hornussen, 1975
- Split and the Croatian Coast, Berlitz, Lausanne, 1977
- Copenhagen, Berlitz, Lausanne, 1979
- Jerusalem, Berlitz, Lausanne, 1979
- Oxford and Stratford, Berlitz, Lausanne, 1981
- South Africa, Berlitz, Lausanne, 1983
- Dänemark, Walter, Olten, 1984
- Toronto, Berlitz, 1986;
- Moine aujourd´hui, Migros Presse/Construire, Zürich, 1986
- Die Schweiz in Genf, Chaîne, Genf, 1986
- Une place pour Lausanne – Flon 90, 24 Heures, Lausanne, 1990
- Washington, Berlitz, 1991
- New York, Berlitz, 1991
- Carrières de femmes – passion d'ingénieures, EPFL, Lausanne 1998
- "Rencontres, – portraits de 35 ans de photojournalisme", textes de Charles-Henri Favrod et Bertil Galland, Editions Benteli, 2000
- "Objectif Photoreportage, – Deux générations, trois photographes" Erling Mandelmann, Claude Huber, Pierre Izard, Editions Benteli, 2007
- "Ceux de Vézelay", Edition: L'association des amis de Vézelay, 2010
- Le photographe, le musicien et l'architecte. Ed. Castagniééé. 2010. ISBN 978-2940425730. Archived from the original on 14 April 2016.
- Show me - 80 portraits, 80 stories, 80 years on earth, Call me Edouard Éditeurs | Publishers, 2016
- MaVie, - à travers mes écrits, des anecdotes, des articles et quelques réflexions. Rassemblés pour mes enfants. Z4 Editions, 2017

== Exhibitions ==
- 1969 : P Galerie-Club Migros, Lausanne (CH)
- 1971 : P Photo-reportages, The Danish Museum of Industrial Art, Copenhagen (DK)
- 1974 : C One World for All, photokina, Köln (D)
- 1975 : C RAPHO, Galerie Clinch, Paris (F)
- 1977 : C The Child of this World, World Exhibition of Photography (D)
- 1978 : P Lausanne 1900, Musée des arts décoratifs, Lausanne (CH)
- 1983 : C 100 ans FSJ, Fédération Suisse des Journalistes, Fribourg (CH)
- 1986 : C Charlottenborg Academy of Fine Arts, Copenhagen (DK)
- 1986 : C l'Histoire du Portrait, Le Musée de l'Élysée au Comptoire suisse, Lausanne (CH)
- 1987 : P Portraits – projection de dias sur une musique de Philip Glass ("Nuit de la photo"), Musée de l'Élysée, Lausanne (CH)
- 1987 : C Fête des vignerons, Musée de l'appareil photo, Vevey (CH)
- 1992 : C Marges, Dpt. de la prévoyance sociale, Vaud (CH)
- 1995 : P Impressionen 95, expo pour les 125 ans de la Clinique Psychiatrique Universitaire, Zurich (ZH)
- 1995 : P Portraits nordique, Nordisches Institut der Ernst-Moritz-Arndt Universität, Greifswald (D)
- 1996 : P Foto-Porträts, Caspar-David-Friedrich Institut, Greifswald (D)
- 1996 : P Mennesker paa min vej ("Rencontres" – 30 ans de portraits), Rundetaarn, Copenhagen (DK )
- 1997 : P Rencontres Portraits de 30 ans de photo-journalisme, Centre vivant d'Art contemporain, Grignan / Drôme, France
- 1997 : P Persönlichkeiten, Nikon Image House, Zürich (CH)
- 1997 : P Portraits, Salon de Sud-Est (l'invité de la 70e édition de l'exposition), Palais des Expositions, Lyon (F)
- 1998 : P Carrières de femmes & passion d'ingenieures, Pont de la Machine, Geneva; EPFL, + Forum Hôtel de Ville, Lausanne, CH
- 1999 : P Rencontres, Espace culturel George-Sand, Saint-Quentin-Fallavier (F)
- 1999 : C Le pays de la Fête 1999, "Fête des Vignerons 1977", Musée de Pully (CH)
- 2000 : P Portraits fin de siècle, Musée historique, Lausanne (CH)
- 2001 : P Musée de l'Histoire Nationale, Modern collection, Château de Frederiksborg (DK)
- 2001 : P Parcours de femmes, l'Université de Neuchâtel (CH)
- 2001 : C Hall of mirrors, portraits from the museums collection, Museet for Fotokunst, Brandts Klædefabrik, Odense (DK)
- 2002 : C Inside the sixties: g.p. 1.2.3.È Musée des Beaux-Arts, Lausanne
- 2002 : C London in the sixties, Organisation Mondiale de la Propriété Intellectuelle, Genève
- 2003 : C Vivre entre deux mondes, Musée historique de Lausanne, 18 portraits d'immigrés
- 2007 : C Objectif photoreportage, Musée Historique de Lausanne
- 2009 : C Au fil du temps, – le jeu de l'âge Fondation Claude Verdan (Musée de la Main), Lausanne
- 2009 : P Ceux de Vézelay – portrait d'un Bourg, expo noir/blanc, Vézeley (FR)
- 2010 : P Le photographe, le musicien et l'architecte, Villa "Le Lac" Le Corbusier/ Corseaux (VD)
- 2010 : C Portrætter fra museets samling, Museet for Fotokunst, Brandts, Odense (DK)
- 2014 : P Oskar Kokoschka dans l'objectif du photographe. Fondaton Oskar Kokoschka au Musée Jenisch, dans le cadre du Festival IMAGES, Vevey (CH)
- 2015 : C "Cimetière monumentale de Milan", Temple de Venterol, with lecture of Dino Buzzati's novel "Weekend" (Le K).

P = solo exhibitions; C = collective exhibitions
