= Elisabeth Baumgartner =

Swiss playwright in Bernese German (1889–1957)

Elisabeth Baumgartner, also known as Elisabeth Baumgartner-Siegenthaler (25 March 1889 – 7 May 1957) was a Swiss farmer, and author of theater and radio plays in Bernese German. Her pseudonym was Änneli in Ämmital.

== Career ==
Elisabeth Baumgartner grew up in the Mettlenalp in Trub and attended school in Fankhaus. She was a peasant woman. After her marriage, Baumgartner began to write plays in Bernese German, primarily based on Jeremias Gotthelf’s material, including D'Lindouere (1936), Ueli der Chnächt (1937), and Ueli the leaseholder (1954). In 1942, Baumgartner wrote Der Schwarz Gascht, based on the novella by Heinrich Zschokke. Later she also wrote lectures and radio plays, which she presented on the radio.

Baumgartner held lectures on life in an Emmental farmhouse, including Würde, Läbe, and Stärbe in the Aemmetaler Puurehus (1938) at the Swiss Society for Folklore in Langnau and Freudiger Alltag (1949) at the Farmers' School in Uttewil Bösingen, which Bertha Schnyder (1887–1968) founded in 1929.

Baumgartner published under her pseudonym in the Emmentaler Nachrichten and in the Alpenhornkalender. Elisabeth Baumgartner was a member of the Bern Writers' Association.

Elizabeth Baumgartner died at the age of 68 in the hospital in Langnau im Emmental, Switzerland.

Licorne-Verlag republished her collections of stories Chnöpf u Blüeschtli and Chlynni Wält in the 1990s.

== Personal life ==
Elisabeth Baumgartner was the daughter of the farmer Johann Siegenthaler. She was the eldest child and had four siblings. Since 1909 she was married to the farmer Christian Baumgartner. Together they had three sons and three daughters. One of their children, Hans Baumgartner (1910–1984), was the pioneer of agricultural accounting in Switzerland. After her marriage, Baumgartner lived in Trubschachen, Switzerland.

== Awards and honors ==
- In 1936, Baumgartner received the Gfeller-Rindlisbacher Prize for dialect plays for her play D'Lindouere.
- In 1944, she received a prize of 1,000 Swiss francs from Radio Bern for her play Heilige Abe.
- In 1946 and 1950, she received the Bern Literature Prize which was endowed with 500 Swiss francs.
- In 1948, she received the third prize of 500 Swiss francs in the Heimatschutztheater competition for her play Peter der Naar.
- As part of the Gotthelf Drama Competition in 1954, she received a fourth prize and 600 Swiss francs.

== Selected works ==
- Ueli der Pächter: ein Spiel in fünf Bildern frei nach Gotthelf. Selbstverlag, Trubschachen i. E. 1937.
- Christian Rubi, Elisabeth Baumgartner, Hans Rhyn: Die Bauernstube. Gassmann, Solothurn 1944.
- Peter der Naar: Schauspiel in vier Akten aus der Zeit der Reformation im Emmental. A. Francke, Bern 1948.
- Chnöpf u Blüeschtli. A. Francke, Bern 1948.
- mit Walter Neuweiler, Hedwig Breitenstein-Müller, Hans Zulliger: Die Bäuerin als Mutter. Buchverlag Verbandsdruckerei, Bern 1950.
- Chlynni Wält: Trueber Gschichte u allerlei vo alte Brüüch. A. Francke, Bern 1951
- No meh Bärner Gschichte. Alfred Scherz, Bern 1953.
- Änneli. A. Scherz, Bern 1953.
- mit Ernst Probst, Hanni Zahner, Hanna Willi, Margrit Bosch-Peter: Zur Berufswahl der Mädchen. Gesellschaft zur Herausgabe von Fachliteratur, Basel 1953.

== See also ==
- Agriculture in Switzerland
