= Éditions Rencontre =

Éditions Rencontre (Meeting Editions) was a left wing publishing house in Francophone Switzerland founded in Lausanne in 1950. In 1970 they sold 6 million books globally to the Francophone world.

Éditions Rencontre was founded as a co-operative society on 16 June 1950. It was founded with the aim of establishing La revue Rencontre, a youth culture magazine despite the founders having no experience in the publishing world. However it became one of the most important book clubs in Europe. The six founding members were:

- Henri Debluë
- Yves Velan
- Jean-Pierre Schlunegger
- Michel Dentan
- Georges Wagen
- Jean Messner

However, they soon involved Pierre Balthasar de Muralt, who soon became the principal person running the company, particularly after the review and the publishing house split.

In 1953 they started producing the "Great Novels" series, under the direction of Louis Guilloux.

By 1968 the company employed 550 people in Lausanne.
