= Anne Cuneo =

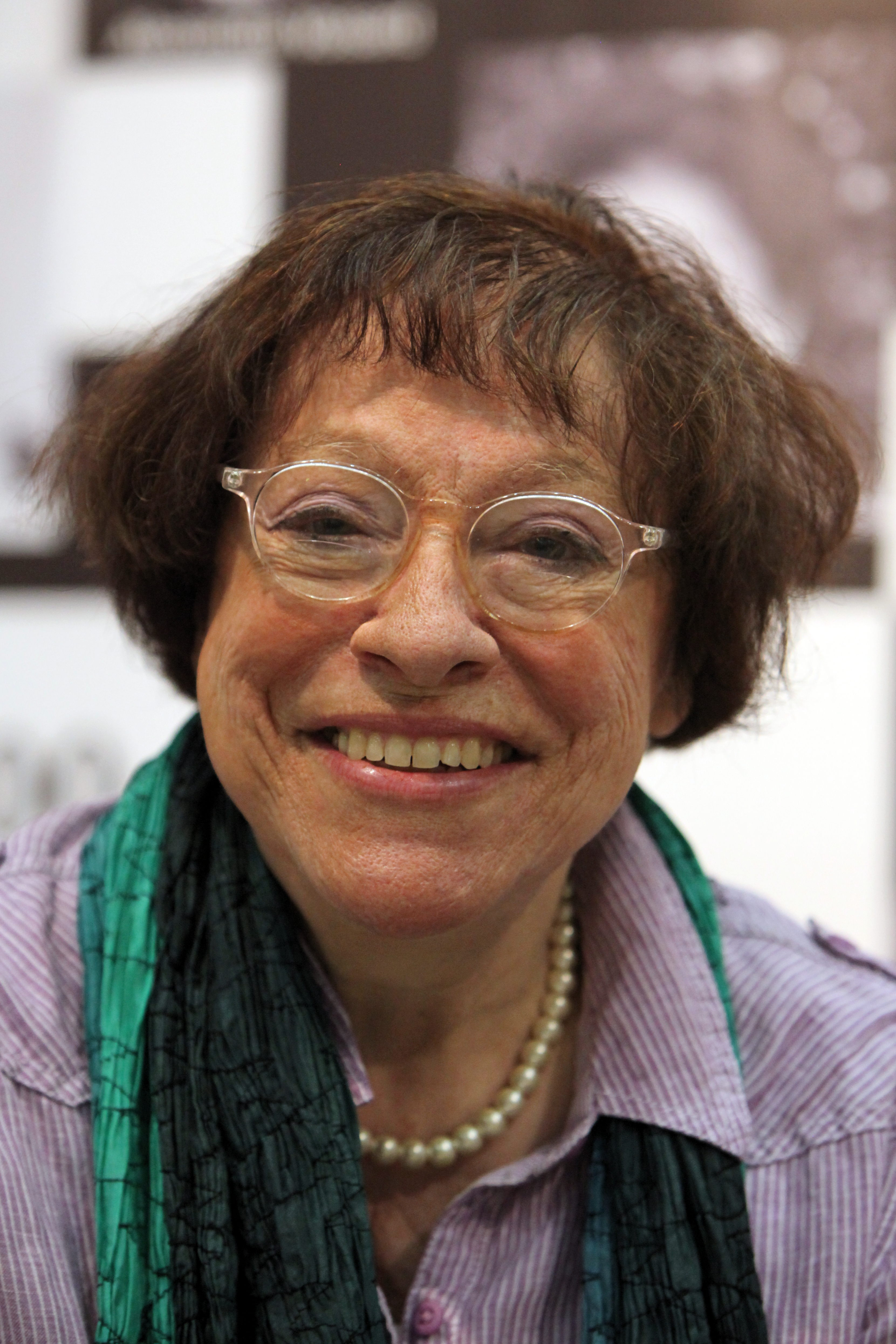
- Born: Anne Cuneo; 6 September 1936; Paris, France
- Died: 11 February 2015 (aged 78)
- Occupations: Journalist, Author, Director, Screenwriter

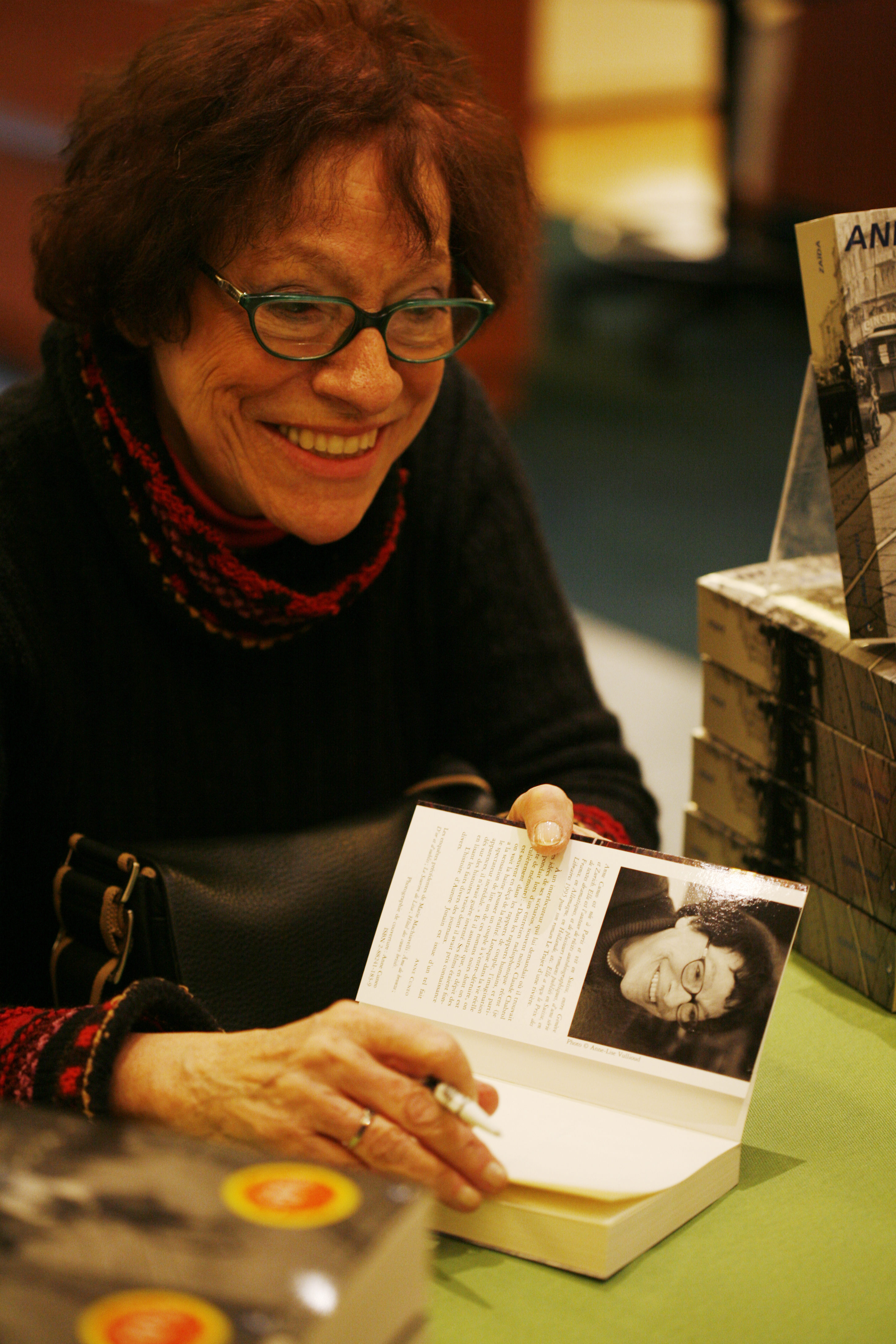
Anne Cuneo at a promotional event in 2007 for her book Zaïda.

Anne Cuneo (6 September 1936 – 11 February 2015) was a Swiss journalist, novelist, theatre and film director and screenwriter.

She was born in Paris of Italian parents, but studied in Lausanne. Her first novel came in 1967 and was called Gravé au diamant. In 1979 she received the lesser prize of the Schweizerische Schillerstiftung and by 1987 she worked for Télévision Suisse Romande.

Her career spanned four decades and fifteen novels, as well as dozens of plays and scripts for theatre, TV and radio. She died in 2015.

in 1995 Cuneo's novel Le trajet d’une rivière was awarded the prestigious Prix des Libraires, which celebrates the best novel published in the Francophone world each year.

== Bibliography ==
- 1967: Gravé au diamant, re-edition in 1968
- 1969: Mortelle maladie
- 1970: La Vermine
- 1972: Poussière du réveil
- 1975: Le Piano du pauvre
- 1976: La Machine Fantaisie
- 1978: Passage des Panoramas
- 1979: Une cuillerée de bleu
- 1980: Les Portes du jour: Portrait de l'auteur en femme ordinaire vol. 1
- 1982: Les Portes du jour: Portrait de l'auteur en femme ordinaire vol. 2
- 1984: Hôtel Vénus
- 1985: Le Monde des forains
- 1987: Benno Besson et Hamlet
- 1989: Station Victoria
- 1990: Prague aux doigts de feu
- 1993: Trajet d'une rivière. (2015: Tregian's Ground, trans. Louise Rogers Lalaurie, And Other Stories, UK)
- 1994: La flûte et les ratonneurs
- 1995: Au bas de mon rêve
- 1996: Objets de splendeur
- 1998: Âme de bronze
- 1999: D'or et d'oublis
- 2000: Le sourire de Lisa
- 2002: Le maître de Garamond
- 2004: Hôtel des cœurs brisés
- 2005: Rencontres avec hamlet
- 2006: Les corbeaux sur nos plaines
- 2006: Lacunes de la mémoire
- 2007: Zaïda
- 2009: Conversation chez les Blancs, Anne-Marie Blanc comédienne
- 2011: Un monde de mots: John Florio, traducteur, lexicographe, pédagogue, homme de lettres
- 2013: La Tempête des heures
- 2014: Gatti's Variétés

== Filmography ==
- 1982: Cinéjournal au féminin
- 1983: Signes de terre, signes de chair
- 1986: Basta
- 1992: Durchdringende Welten, le peintre Cenak Prajak
- 1996: Die letzte Karte, Friedrich Glaser
- 1996: Francis Tregian, Gentleman et Musicien
- 1998: D'or et d'oubli (script)
- 2001: La Petite Gilberte, Anne-Marie Blanc comédienne
- 2002: Ettore Cella, ein Künstlerleben
- 2003: Ferdi 'national' Kübler
- 2006: Opération Shakespeare à la Vallée de Joux

== Awards ==
- 1969: L'Anti-Prix de la Radio Suisse Romande
- 1979: Schiller Award for her oeuvre
- 1981: Prix culturel du Canton Zurich
- 1990: Bibliomedia et Prix Alpes-Jura, for Station Victoria
- 1994: Prix des Auditeurs de la Radio suisse romande
- 1994: Prix de la Fondation vaudoise pour la Promotion artistique
- 1995: Prix des Libraires et Prix litteraire "Madame Europe" for Le Trajet d'une rivière
- 2008 Anne Cuneo was awarded the title "Chevalier de l’Ordre des Arts et des Lettres de la République française"
- 2013 she was named "Commandeur de l’ordre National du Mérite".
