= Erika Burkart =

Swiss writer (1922–2010)

Erika Burkart (8 February 1922 – 14 April 2010) was a Swiss writer, teacher and poet. She wrote poems and epic poems, and received international recognition. Burkart was the recipient of many awards, among them the Conrad-Ferdinand-Meyer-Preis, the Gottfried-Keller-Preis, the Joseph-Breitbach-Preis, and the Wolfgang-Amadeus-Mozart-Preis. She was also awarded the Grand Prize of the Swiss Schiller Foundation, the only woman to have received the prize.

== Life ==
Erika Burkart was born on 8 February 1922 in Aarau, and spent much of her life in Aristau. She trained as a primary school teacher, and taught in a number of schools before becoming a full-time writer in 1955. Burkart wrote twenty four collections of poetry over her life. Her debut poetry collection, Der dunkle Vogel (The Dark Bird), was published in 1953. Some of Burkart's poems were set to music by Rudolf Kelterborn and Gottfried von Einem. Burkart also wrote eight prose works, which achieved international recognition. Her first novel Moräne, published in 1970, was quoted in Alice Miller's book Poisonous Pedagogy.

Erika Burkart's literary estate is archived in the Swiss Literary Archives in Bern.

Burkart died in Muri on 14 April 2010. She was married to writer Ernst Halter.

== Awards ==
Burkart was the recipient of many awards. Burkart was awarded the Droste Prize in 1958, the Conrad-Ferdinand-Meyer-Preis in 1961, the J. P. Hebel Prize in 1978, and in 1990 both the Mozart Prize and the Gottfried Keller Prize. She won the Joseph Breitbach Prize in 2002. In 2005, she was awarded the Grand Schiller Prize by the Swiss Schiller Foundation, on the foundation's 100th anniversary. At the time of her death in 2010 she was the only woman to ever have been awarded the prize, and as the prize has not been awarded since 2012, this remains the case.

== Works ==
=== Poetry books ===
- Der dunkle Vogel, Tschudy Verlag, St. Gallen 1953
- Sterngefährten, Tschudy Verlag, St. Gallen 1955
- Bann und Flug, Tschudy Verlag, St. Gallen 1956
- Geist der Fluren, Tschudy Verlag, St. Gallen 1958
- Die gerettete Erde, Tschudy Verlag, St. Gallen 1960
- Mit den Augen der Kore, Tschudy Verlag, St. Gallen 1962
- Ich lebe, Artemis Verlag, Zurich 1964
- Die weichenden Ufer, Artemis Verlag, Zurich 1967
- Fernkristall. Ausgewählte Gedichte, Verlag an der Hartnau, Tobel (TG) 1972
- Die Transparenz der Scherben, Benziger Verlag, Zurich 1973
- Das Licht im Kahlschlag, Artemis Verlag, Zurich 1977
- Augenzeuge. Ausgewählte Gedichte, Artemis Verlag, Zurich 1978
- Die Freiheit der Nacht, Artemis Verlag, Zurich 1981
- Sternbild des Kindes, Artemis Verlag, Zurich 1984
- Schweigeminute, Artemis Verlag, Zurich 1988
- Ich suche den blauen Mohn, Pflanzengedichte (Blumenbilder Max Löw), GS-Verlag, Basel 1989
- Die Zärtlichkeit der Schatten, Ammann Verlag, Zurich 1991
- Stille fernster Rückruf, Ammann Verlag, Zurich 1997
- Langsamer Satz, Ammann Verlag, Zurich 2002
- Ortlose Nähe, Ammann Verlag, Zurich 2005
- Geheimbrief, Ammann Verlag, Zurich 2009
- Das späte Erkennen der Zeichen, Weissbooks.w Verlag, Frankfurt am Main 2010
- Nachtschicht / Schattenzone, Weissbooks.w Verlag, Frankfurt am Main 2011, together with Ernst Halter

=== English translation ===
- Nightshift / An Area of Shadows (Spuyten Duyvil, 2013), translated by Marc Vincenz, ISBN 978-0-923389-06-2
- A Late Recognition of the Signs (Spuyten Duyvil, 2016), translated by Marc Vincenz, ISBN 978-0-923389-10-9

== Prose works ==
- Moräne, novel, Walter Verlag, Olten 1970
- Jemand entfernt sich, stories, Benziger Verlag, Zürich 1972
- Rufweite, Artemis Verlag, Zürich 1975
- Der Weg zu den Schafen, novel, Artemis Verlag, Zürich 1979
- Die Spiele der Erkenntnis, Artemis Verlag, Zürich 1985
- Das Schimmern der Flügel, Ammann Verlag, Zürich 1994
- Grundwasserstrom . Aufzeichnungen, Ammann Verlag, Zürich 2000 ISBN 978-3-250-10416-2
- Die Vikarin, Ammann Verlag, Zürich 2006
