= List of Swiss poets =

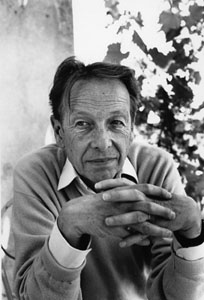
After Jean-Jacques Rousseau, Blaise Cendrars and Charles-Ferdinand Ramuz, the poet Philippe Jaccottet is the fourth Swiss author to be published in the Bibliothèque de la Pléiade.

This is a list of Swiss poets, consisting of both authors native to Switzerland, and authors born elsewhere who have influenced Swiss literature through their work. Swiss literature may be split into four parts based on the language of the author, although some authors may write in multiple languages. (Years link to corresponding "[year] in poetry" articles.)

== French language ==
- Raphaël Aubert (born 1953)
- S. Corinna Bille (1912–1979)
- Blaise Cendrars (Frédéric Louis Sauser) (1887–1961)
- Maurice Chappaz (1916–2009)
- Pierre Chappuis (1930–2020)
- Victor Cherbuliez (1829–1899)
- Jacques Chessex (1934–2009)
- Germain Clavien (1933–2012)
- Anne Cuneo (1936–2015)
- Markus Hediger (born 1959)
- Jeanne Hersch (1910–2000)
- Philippe Jaccottet (1925–2021)
- Ella Maillart (1903–1997)
- Pierrette Micheloud (1915–2007)
- Marc Monnier (1827–1885)
- Suzanne Necker, née Suzanne Curchod (1739–1794)
- Juste Olivier (1807–1876)
- Guy de Pourtalès (1881–1941)
- Pericle Pattochi (11.03.1911 Lugano – 13.04. 1968 à Loèche-les-Bains), chevalier-poète, La Suisse Romande écrivain poetique et professeur Suisse de la poesie française
- Eugène Rambert (1830–1886)
- Charles Ferdinand Ramuz (1878–1947)
- Grisélidis Réal (1929–2005)
- Alice Rivaz (1901–1998)
- Gustave Roud (1897–1976)
- Léon Savary (1895–1968)
- Anne Louise Germaine de Staël (Madame de Staël) (1766–1817)
- Jean-Pierre Vallotton (born 1955)

== German language ==
- Jürg Amann (1947–2013)
- Lukas Bärfuss (born 1971)
- Maja Beutler (1936–2021)
- Peter Bichsel (1935–2025)
- Silvio Blatter (born 1946)
- Hermann Burger (1942–1989)
- Erika Burkart (1922–2010)
- Martin R. Dean (born 1955)
- Rolf Dobelli (born 1966)
- Friedrich Dürrenmatt (1921–1990)
- Marianne Ehrmann (1755–1795)
- Jürg Federspiel (1931–2007)
- Max Frisch (1911–1991)
- Salomon Gessner (1730–1788)
- Friedrich Glauser (1896–1938)
- Eugen Gomringer (1925–2025)
- Jeremias Gotthelf (Albert Bitzius) (1797–1854)
- Albrecht von Haller (1708–1777)
- Lukas Hartmann (born 1944)
- Eveline Hasler (born 1933)
- Meta Heusser-Schweizer (1797–1876)
- Ludwig Hohl (1904–1980)
- Franz Hohler (born 1943)
- Thomas Hürlimann (born 1950)
- Pierre Imhasly (1939–2017)
- Zoë Jenny (born 1974)
- Hanna Johansen (1939–2023)
- Gottfried Keller (1819–1890)
- Christian Kracht (born 1966)
- Gertrud Leutenegger (1948–2025)
- Heinrich Leuthold (1827–1879)
- Hugo Loetscher (1929–2009)
- Kurt Marti (High German and Swiss-German) (1921–2017)
- Niklaus Meienberg (1940–1993)
- Helen Meier (1929–2021)
- Pascal Mercier (1944–2023)
- Klaus Merz (born 1945)
- Conrad Ferdinand Meyer (1825–1898)
- Adolf Muschg (born 1934)
- Paul Nizon (born 1929)
- Erica Pedretti (1930–2022)
- Ilma Rakusa (born 1946)
- Johann Gaudenz von Salis-Seewis (1762–1834)
- Jakob Schaffner (1875–1944)
- Hansjörg Schneider (born 1938)
- Jürg Schubiger (1936–2014)
- Annemarie Schwarzenbach (1908–1942)
- René Sommer (born 1954)
- Gerold Späth (born 1939)
- Carl Spitteler (1845–1924)
- Johanna Spyri (1827–1901)
- Peter Stamm (born 1963)
- Verena Stefan (1947–2017)
- Albert Steffen (1884–1963)
- Beat Sterchi (born 1949)
- Gottfried Strasser (1854–1912)
- Martin Suter (born 1948)
- Rudolf von Tavel (1866–1934)
- Raphael Urweider (born 1974)
- Johann Martin Usteri (1763–1828)
- Robert Walser (1878–1956)
- Otto F. Walter (1928–1994)
- Silja Walter (1919–2011)
- Markus Werner (1944–2016)
- Urs Widmer (1938–2014)
- Johann Rudolf Wyss (1781–1830)
- Werner Zemp (1906–1959)
- Albin Zollinger (1885–1941)
- Fritz Zorn (1944–1976)
- Roland Zoss (born 1951)
- Johann Heinrich Daniel Zschokke (1771–1848)

== Italian language ==
- Giorgio Orelli (1921–2013)
- Giovanni Orelli (1928–2016)
- Fabio Pusterla (born 1957)
- Pierre Lepori (born 1968)
- Fabiano Alborghetti (born 1968)

== mansh language ==
- Peider Lansel (1863–1943)

== See also ==
- Swiss literature
