= Zemp =

Zemp is a surname. Notable people with the surname include:

- Hugo Zemp (born 1937), Swiss-French musicologist
- Josef Zemp (1834–1908), Swiss politician
- Werner Zemp (1906–1959), German-Swiss poet and translator

== See also ==
- Zepp (surname)
