= Willy Spiller =

Swiss photographer and photojournalist (born 1947)

- Willy Spiller in his studio, c. 2022
- Born: May 10, 1947 (age 79); Zürich, Switzerland
- Occupations: Photographer, photojournalist
- Known for: Zürich 1967–1976, Hell on Wheels, Street Life NY/LA 1977–1985
- Website: www.willyspiller.com

Willy Spiller (born 10 May 1947 in Zürich) is a Swiss photographer and photojournalist. He became known in particular for his documentary photographs from Zürich, New York City, and Los Angeles. His best-known bodies of work include Zürich 1967–1976, Hell on Wheels with photographs from the New York City Subway, and Street Life NY/LA 1977–1985.

== Life ==
Willy Spiller was born on 10 May 1947 in Zürich and grew up in the Zürcher Oberland. He completed photographic training at what was then the Kunstgewerbeschule Zürich (Zurich School of Arts and Crafts), graduating in 1968. He then pursued further education in Milan, where he gained experience in a wide variety of photographic disciplines. He subsequently worked for 45 years as a photojournalist and freelance photographer for international newspapers, magazines, agencies, and companies. Spiller is noted as the only Swiss contributor to Getty Images.

In the 1960s and 1970s, Spiller worked as a photojournalist for, among others, the Züri Leu and the Neue Zürcher Zeitung. He also undertook reporting trips through Europe and South America.

In 1977 Spiller moved to New York City, where he lived until 1984. There he worked as a freelance photojournalist and held an NZZ press pass. During this period he produced, among other works, his well-known photographs of the New York subway and urban life. Over the course of eight years, he amassed some 2,000 frames in the subway system.

He later also worked in Los Angeles. After returning to Europe, he undertook further travels, including to Africa and Southeast Asia. On various projects he collaborated with writers such as Paul Nizon and Hugo Loetscher.

Spiller lives and works in Zürich.

== Work ==
Spiller's photographic output includes documentary photography, photojournalism, art photography, and corporate photography. He has also made experimental films. His work has been widely exhibited and received numerous honours. His works often combine journalistic observation of everyday life with a subjective and sometimes spontaneous pictorial composition. His signature mark involves capturing images that re-tell everyday stories, using techniques of fine art and documentary photography.

A significant part of his work was created in public space. In addition to street scenes and reportage, Spiller dealt with urban milieus, architecture, social situations, and landscape. Several bodies of work were first photographed as part of his journalistic work and later published as independent book and exhibition projects. His most recent projects include City Life. The Human Park and Moonlight.

=== Zürich 1967–1976 ===
From 1967 to 1976, Spiller documented life in Zürich. The photographs were created in part as part of his work as a local reporter and show street scenes, social events, artists, nightlife, and various social milieus.

Spiller photographed, among other things, the social changes surrounding the 1968 movement and the Zürich art scene. Among the personalities he portrayed are Sigmar Polke and Federico Fellini.

The early Zürich photographs were predominantly in black and white. At that time Spiller worked as a photojournalist for the Züri Leu, which did not publish color photographs.

The body of work was collected in 2019 in the book Zürich 1967–1976 and presented in an exhibition at Bildhalle in Zürich.

=== Brazil and international reportage ===
Even before his stay in the United States, Spiller worked on international reportage. His early projects include photographs from Brazil. The Fotostiftung Schweiz lists, among other things, the publication Menschen am Rande (Brasilien), published in 1974 by the Directorate for Development Cooperation and Humanitarian Aid.

In 1990 the portfolio Sterben in Canindé appeared, which likewise goes back to Spiller's work in Brazil.

Further reportage took Spiller to Africa and Asia. The international travels were realized in part in collaboration with writers and later published in book projects.

=== Hell on Wheels – New York Subway 1977–1984 ===
One of Spiller's best-known bodies of work is Hell on Wheels, created between 1977 and 1984 in the New York City Subway. During his stay in New York, Spiller regularly photographed in the trains and stations of the subway system.

The photographs show passengers and employees as well as the architecture and technical infrastructure of the subway. Motifs include everyday situations, encounters between different social groups, platforms and trains, and people's behavior in public space.

Spiller worked with a Leica and high-speed film, which made photographs possible under the difficult lighting conditions of the subway.

The works were first published in 1986 in the book Subway New York. A later edition appeared under the title Hell on Wheels. In 2023 an expanded new edition was published by Edition Bildhalle, containing further material in addition to already known photographs. The 2023 edition was redesigned, includes never-before-seen images, and features an introduction by writer and editor Bill Shapiro. It was published in an edition of 1000 signed copies.

The New York subway photographs are among Spiller's most frequently exhibited and published works. They were shown, among other places, in Lausanne and New York in the 1980s and later in Zürich, Amsterdam, and other cities. Spiller has said he was inspired by the work of Robert Frank.

=== Street Life NY/LA 1977–1985 ===
The body of work Street Life NY/LA 1977–1985 extends Spiller's view of urban life beyond the subway. It comprises photographs from New York City and Los Angeles taken during and immediately after his stay in the United States.

In New York, Spiller photographed on the streets, in various neighborhoods, and in nightlife. Motifs also include the dancers and visitors of Studio 54 and representatives of early hip-hop culture.

In Los Angeles, photographs of public life, pool and leisure life, and various social milieus were created. Spiller photographed members of high society as well as everyday situations in public space.

The body of work was exhibited in 2017/18 at Bildhalle Zürich as Street Life NY/LA 1977–1985.

The date range 1977–1985 is broader than Spiller's actual stay in New York, which the Fotostiftung Schweiz gives as 1977 to 1984.

=== Los Angeles ===
A separate focus within Spiller's American work is his photographs from Los Angeles. They were created during his activity as a freelance photojournalist and show different social milieus of the city.

Spiller photographed, among other things, life in wealthy residential areas and at swimming pools. For the NZZ he also produced reportage on survivalists and on wealthy residents of the city.

The Los Angeles photographs were shown together with works from New York in exhibitions and publications under the thematic complex Street Life NY/LA.

=== Studio 54 and New York nightlife ===
Part of the photographs created during Spiller's New York years deals with the city's nightlife. These include images from the milieu of Studio 54, which became a well-known meeting place of the New York club and cultural scene at the end of the 1970s.

Spiller photographed visitors, dancers, and nightlife situations there. The images today belong to the broader holdings of his New York photography and were shown, among other contexts, in connection with the body of work Street Life NY/LA 1977–1985.

=== Hip-hop and the Bronx ===
During his New York years, Spiller also documented early hip-hop culture. His photographs include images from the Bronx and from the milieu of the music and youth culture developing there.

The photographs were created as part of his general observation of New York street life and were later rediscovered and exhibited as part of his New York works.

=== Architecture and Power ===
On his own website, Spiller lists Architecture and Power as an independent area of work.

In this area of work, Spiller deals with architecture and built space. Architecture is understood not solely as aesthetic form but also in connection with social structures and power relations.

The works expand Spiller's documentary approach with a more conceptual engagement with the relationship between people and their built environment.

=== Moonlight ===
Another focus of Spiller's later work is landscape photography at night. Under the title Mondlicht (Moonlight), works were exhibited, among other places, in Zürich in 2006 and in Verbier in 2007.

In contrast to his street photography works, these photographs concentrate more strongly on landscape, light, and atmosphere. The motif of moonlight connects photographic observation with a more formal and atmospheric pictorial composition.

=== Travels with Paul Nizon ===
Spiller collaborated several times with the writer Paul Nizon. The collaboration included, among other things, joint travels and book projects.

The 2003 book Adieu à l'Europe combines a text by Nizon with photographs by Spiller. The photographs were created in connection with a joint journey through Southeast Asia. The volume is accompanied by twenty-one photographs by Spiller.

The combination of literary text and photographic reportage is characteristic of part of Spiller's later work.

=== Helvetica ===
On Spiller's own website, Helvetica is listed as another area of work.

The works are connected with his engagement with Switzerland and its visual and built environment. In contrast to the historically more extensively documented bodies of work Zürich 1967–1976 and Hell on Wheels, fewer independent publications and art-historical assessments exist for this area of work to date.

=== Flower portraits ===
Apart from classical street photography and photojournalism, Spiller also devoted himself to flower photography. He described his approach to this subject with the words: "I make portraits of flowers in the same way that I make portraits of people. I photograph them where I see them and leave them there. After all, I don't take the people I photograph on the street home with me either."

The flower portraits show wilted and faded plants in close-up and thus stand in a photographic tradition that places the transitory and everyday at the center. The series was shown in 2024 at the Zürich gallery Stephan Witschi (Galerie & Edition Stephan Witschi) as part of the group exhibition floral unterwegs (Floral on the Road). The exhibition ran from 24 May to 29 June 2024.

== Style and working method ==
Spiller's working method is characterized by immediate observation of public space. He often photographs from close range and concentrates on chance encounters, gestures, and social situations.

For his New York works he used a Leica M3 and high-speed film. This allowed him to photograph even in poor lighting conditions and in the subway without elaborate lighting.

The writer Paul Nizon described Spiller's photographic approach as "a mixture of shameless curiosity and roguish complicity, but also brotherly compassion." Nizon further characterized Spiller as "the embodiment of the headhunter" who is "always hot on the trail of human comedy, or rather tragic comedy".

== Awards and grants ==
- 1970: Achievement Prize of the City of Zürich
- 1973: Swiss federal scholarship
- 1975: Swiss federal scholarship
- 1977: Kodak Book Prize

Spiller has received prizes for both his published and exhibited work, most notably for his books Pictures of a Local Reporter and Subway New York: People in the Underground. His foreign and domestic reportages have been recognised with multiple awards.

Entries in the archive of the Swiss Press Award document his journalistic work but do not by themselves constitute evidence of prizes won and are therefore not listed here as awards.

== Exhibitions (selection) ==
- 2024: Floral on the Road (floral unterwegs), Galerie Stephan Witschi, Zürich (group exhibition), 24 May – 29 June 2024
- 2024: The Photography Show presented by AIPAD, New York (group exhibition, Bildhalle)
- 2023: Hell on Wheels – New York Subway 1977–1984, Bildhalle, Zürich, 30 March – 27 May 2023
- 2023: Hell on Wheels, Bildhalle, Amsterdam, 2 June – 22 July 2023
- 2021: New York 1977–1985, Bildhalle, Amsterdam
- 2019: Zürich 1967–1976 (with Fred Mayer), Bildhalle, Zürich
- 2017–2018: Street Life NY/LA 1977–1985, Bildhalle, Zürich
- 2015: Zürich – Los Angeles, Photobastei, Zürich
- 2012: Stromschnellen der Freiheit [Rapids of Freedom], Haus für Kunst Uri, Altdorf (photography and experimental film)
- 2012: Mondlicht [Moonlight], Galerie Walter Keller, Zürich
- 2007: Mondlicht [Moonlight], Art Barn Gallery, Verbier
- 2006: Mondlicht [Moonlight], Haus zum Bracken, Zürich
- 2006: Auf dem Weg nach Mandalay [On the Way to Mandalay], Panasia Galerie, Davos
- 2005: Auf dem Weg nach Mandalay [On the Way to Mandalay], Leica Galerie, Biel
- 2004: Abschied von Europa [Farewell to Europe], Panasia Galerie, Zürich
- 2002: Zusammenspiel [Interaction], Hochschule für Musik, Zürich
- 1990: Brasilien [Brazil], SCALO, Zürich
- 1986: Brasilien [Brazil], Centre Culturel Suisse, Paris
- 1984: Subway New York, Musée des Arts Décoratifs, Lausanne
- 1982: Subway New York, Swiss Center, New York

Spiller's photographs are held, among other collections, by the Kunsthaus Zürich, the Swiss National Museum, the Fotostiftung Schweiz, the Getty Collection, and the Musée de l'Elysée.

== Publications (selection) ==
- Sketches. With Urs Lüthi and David Weiss. Toni Gerber Verlag, Bern 1970.
- Menschen am Rande (Brasilien) [People on the Margins (Brazil)]. Directorate for Development Cooperation and Humanitarian Aid, Bern 1974.
- Musikinstrumente und wie man sie spielt [Musical Instruments and How to Play Them]. Atlantis, Zürich 1975.
- Die Stadt. Bilder eines Lokalreporters [The City: Pictures of a Local Reporter]. Kossodo, Geneva 1977.
- Subway New York. Text by Jürg Ramspeck. Stemmle, Schaffhausen 1986.
- Sterben in Canindé [Dying in Canindé]. Portfolio, Der Alltag, Zürich 1990.
- Adieu à l'Europe. Text by Paul Nizon. Actes Sud, Arles 2003.
- Bellevue Zürich. Verlag NZZ, Zürich 2005.
- Zürich 1967–1976. Edition Bildhalle, Zürich 2019.
- Hell on Wheels – New York Subway 1977–1984. Revised edition with new design and unseen images, 2023.

== Reception ==
Spiller's photographic work has been received in particular for its documentary depiction of urban life and his photographs from New York. The Fotostiftung Schweiz lists him in its image archive and has documented exhibitions and publications since the 1970s.

The body of work Zürich 1967–1976 was republished and exhibited in 2019. The photographs document a period of social and cultural change in Zürich and were praised in reception in particular as a historical document of the city's history.

The New York photographs received particular international attention. The new edition of Hell on Wheels in 2023 led to renewed exhibitions and reviews in international media. Spiller is considered one of Switzerland's greatest living photojournalists. His career arc has been compared to that of Robert Frank.

In 2024, photographs by Spiller were shown as part of The Photography Show presented by AIPAD in New York. The Guardian highlighted his subway photographs, among other things.
