= Georges Borgeaud =

Swiss writer and publisher

Georges Borgeaud (27 July 1914, in Lausanne – 6 December 1998, in Paris) was a Swiss writer and publisher.

== Education ==
Georges Borgeaud studied at Collège d'Aubonne and Collège de Saint-Maurice, where he met Maurice Chappaz and Jean Cuttat. His novel The Préau (1952), partly autobiographical, also described this period of his life. He gave private lessons and worked as a bookseller in Zurich and Fribourg. His stay at Glérolles Castle, where he met S. Corinna Bille, provides the framework for his second novel The Dishes of Bishops (1959). A collection of poetic prose, Italy (1959), followed, and a monograph on the painter Pierre Boncompain.

Georges Borgeaud settled in Paris in 1946. He wrote slowly and carefully rewrote several times his manuscripts and excelled in describing the world outside. His estate is archived in the Swiss Literary Archives in Bern.

== Awards ==
He won awards: Critics Award for The Awning (1952), the International Journalism Award in Rome (1962), the Prix Renaudot for travel abroad (1974), the Prix Médicis for an essay (1986). Georges Borgeaud also received a special tribute in 1989 from Vaud Foundation for the promotion and artistic creation.

== Works ==
- Le Préau: roman. Gallimard. 1952.; Éditions L'Age d'homme, 1982
- La Vaisselle des évêques, roman, Gallimard, 1959
- Italiques, chroniques, Éditions L'Age d'homme, 1969
- Le Voyage à l'étranger, roman, Bertil Galland, 1974, ISBN 2-253-01367-6
- Le Soleil sur Aubiac, Bernard Grasset, 1987, ISBN 978-2-246-26051-6, Prix Jacques-Chardonne (1987)
- Mille Feuilles (tomes I-IV), chroniques, 1997-1999; La Bibliothèque des arts, 1997, ISBN 978-2-88453-036-1
- Le Jour du printemps, roman, Denoël, 1999, ISBN 978-2-207-24895-9
