= Jürg Amann =

Swiss author and dramatist

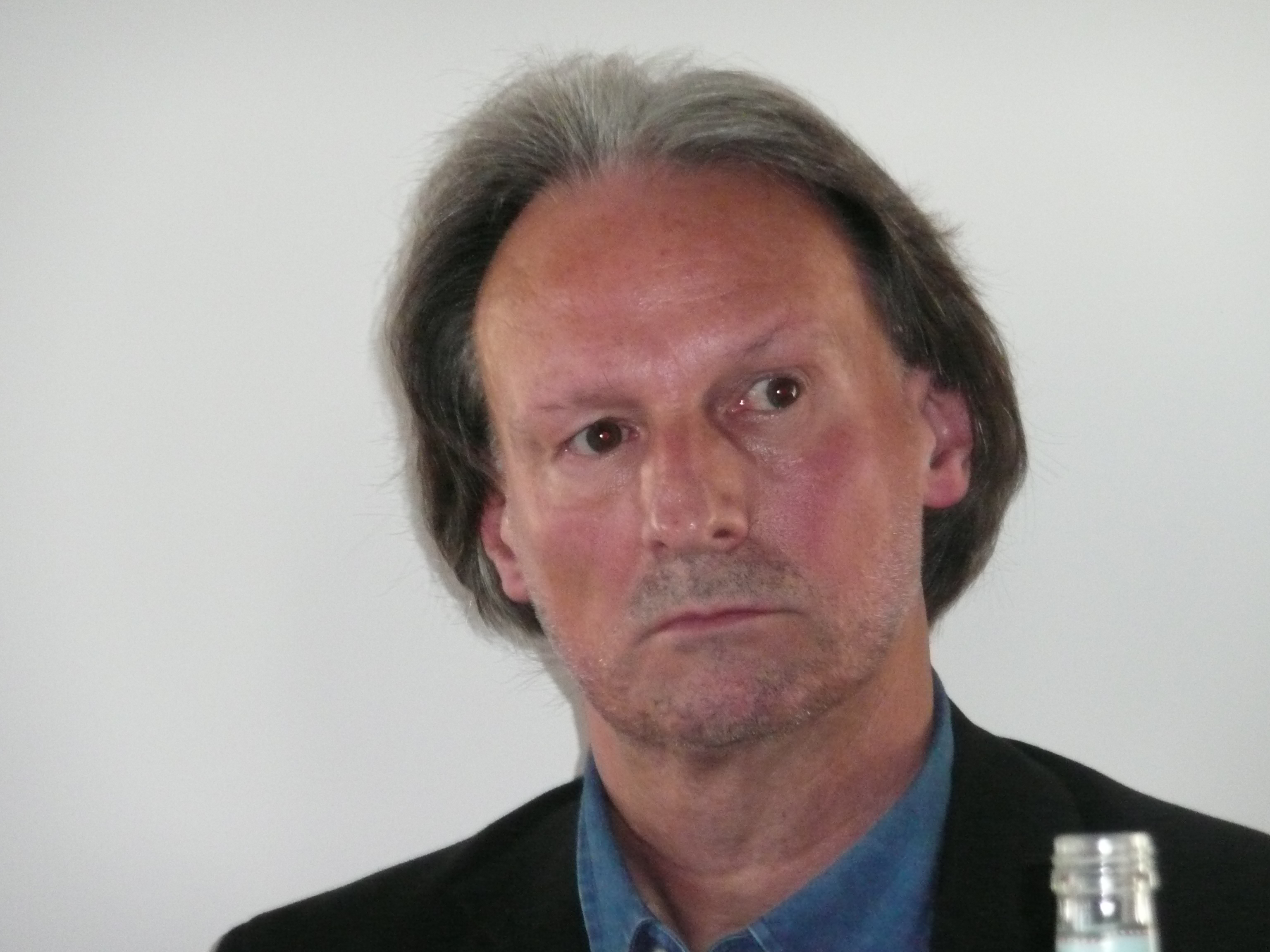

Jürg Amann (born in Winterthur on 2 July 1947; died on 5 May 2013, in Zurich) was a Swiss author and dramatist. He has written radio plays, a biography of Robert Walser, and other works.

== Awards ==
- 1982 Ingeborg Bachmann Prize
- 1983 Conrad-Ferdinand-Meyer-Preis

== Bibliography ==
=== German ===
- Das Symbol Kafka. Bern 1974
- Die Korrektur. Wien 1977
- Hardenberg. Romantische Erzählung nach dem Nachlass des Novalis. Aarau 1978
- Verirren oder Das plötzliche Schweigen des Robert Walser. Aarau 1978
- Die Kunst des wirkungsvollen Abgangs. Aarau 1979
- Die Baumschule. Berichte aus dem Réduit. München 1982
- Büchners Lenz. Wien 1983
- Nachgerufen. München 1983
- Ach, diese Wege sind sehr dunkel. München 1985. Enthält drei Stücke: Ach, diese Wege sind sehr dunkel, Büchners Lenz, Die deutsche Nacht.
- Patagonien. München 1985
- Robert Walser. Auf der Suche nach einem verlorenen Sohn. München 1985; Zürich 2006, ISBN 3-257-06553-1
- Fort. Eine Brieferzählung. München 1987
- Nach dem Fest. München 1988. Enthält 3 Stücke: Nach dem Fest, Der Traum des Seiltänzers vom freien Fall, Die Korrektur.
- Der Rücktritt. Eine nationale Tragödie. Zelg-Wolfhalden 1989
- Tod Weidigs. Acht Erzählungen. München 1989
- Der Vater der Mutter und Der Vater des Vaters. Düsseldorf 1990
- Der Anfang der Angst. Aus einer glücklichen Kindheit. Düsseldorf 1991
- Widerschein. Bildteppiche von Ilse Abka Prandstetter. Texte von Jürg Amann, Friederike Mayröcker und Julian Schutting. Nachwort von Peter Weiermair, Innsbruck 1991
- Zwei oder drei Dinge. Innsbruck 1993
- Über die Jahre. Innsbruck 1994
- Und über die Liebe wäre wieder zu sprechen. Innsbruck 1994
- Rondo und andere Erzählungen. Zürich 1996
- Schöne Aussicht. Innsbruck 1997
- Ikarus. Zürich 1998
- Iphigenie oder Operation Meereswind. Mit Bildern von Anton Christian, Düsseldorf 1998
- Golomir. Weitra 1999
- Kafka. Wort-Bild-Essay (mit Albert T. Schaefer). Haymon, Innsbruck 2000, ISBN 3-85218-319-7
- Am Ufer des Flusses. Erzählung. Haymon, Innsbruck 2001, ISBN 3-85218-350-2
- Kein Weg nach Rom. Ein Reisebuch (mit Albert T. Schaefer). Eremiten-Presse, Düsseldorf 2001, ISBN 3-87365-325-7
- Mutter töten. Prosa. Haymon, Innsbruck 2003, ISBN 3-85218-429-0
- Sternendrift. Ein amerikanisches Tagebuch (mit Bildern von Silvio Blatter). Eremiten-Presse, Düsseldorf 2003, ISBN 3-87365-331-1
- Wind und Weh. Abschied von den Eltern. Eremiten-Presse, Düsseldorf 2005, ISBN 3-87365-337-0
- Pornographische Novelle. Tisch 7, Köln 2005, ISBN 3-938476-06-0
- Übermalungen-Überspitzungen. Van-Gogh-Variationen (mit Urs Amann). Haymon, Innsbruck 2005, ISBN 3-85218-491-6
- Zimmer zum Hof. Erzählungen. Haymon, Innsbruck 2006, ISBN 3-85218-511-4
- Mehr bedarfs nicht: 12 mal beste deutsche Gedichte, München Piper Verlag 2006 ISBN 978-3492049146
- Pekinger Passion. Arche, Zürich 2008, ISBN 978-3-7160-2376-1
- Nichtsangst. Fragmente auf Tod und Leben. Haymon, Innsbruck 2008, ISBN 978-3-85218-525-5
- Die kalabrische Hochzeit. Roman. Zürich 2009, ISBN 978-3-7160-2615-1
- Die Reise zum Horizont. Novelle. Haymon, Innsbruck 2010, ISBN 978-3-85218-640-5
- Der Kommandant. Monolog. Arche, Zürich 2011, ISBN 978-3-7160-2639-7
- Die Briefe der Puppe. Nimbus, Wädenswil 2011, ISBN 978-3-907142-57-8
- Letzte Lieben. Arche, Zürich 2011, ISBN 978-3-7160-2671-7
- Ein Lied von Sein und Schein. Nimbus, Wädenswil 2012, ISBN 978-3-907142-70-7
- Wohin denn wir. Roman. Haymon, Innsbruck 2012, ISBN 978-3-85218-764-8
- Vater, warum hast du mich verlassen. Arche, Zürich 2013, ISBN 978-3-71602-694-6
- Die erste Welt. Nimbus, Wädenswil 2013, ISBN 978-3-907142-89-9

== See also ==
- List of Swiss poets
