= Sterchi =

Sterchi is a surname. Notable people with the surname include:

- Beat Sterchi (born 1949), Swiss author
- James G. Sterchi (1867–1932), American businessman
