= Lepori =

Lepori is an Italian surname. Notable people with the surname include:

- Giuseppe Lepori (1902–1968), Swiss politician
- Mauro-Giuseppe Lepori (born 1959), Swiss Roman Catholic clergy
- Paolo Lepori (born 1959), Italian sprint canoeist
- Pierre Lepori (born 1968), Swiss translator and writer
- Richard Lepori (born 1991), Italian rugby league player
