= Conrad Ferdinand Meyer Prize =

Swiss literary award

The Conrad-Ferdinand-Meyer-Preis was a literary award in memory of Conrad Ferdinand Meyer.

The prize was given annually to up to three recipients by the Conrad Ferdinand Meyer-Stiftung in Zürich.

The Conrad Ferdinand Meyer Foundation (Zurich) was officially dissolved on 22 March 2024, and has thereby ceased its operations.

== Laureates ==
- 1938 Max Frisch
- 1939 Franz Fischer
- 1941 Walter Sautter
- 1942 Walter Corti
- 1944 Kurt Guggenheim (Note: Sources disagree: the HDS biography of Guggenheim gives 1943.)
- 1954 Hans Boesch
- 1955 Franz Fassbind
- 1958 Erwin Jaeckle
- 1959 Karl Jakob Wegmann
- 1960 Raffael Ganz
- 1961 Erika Burkart
- 1964 Herbert Meier
- 1966 Hugo Loetscher
- 1967 Werner Weber
- 1968 Adolf Muschg, Franz Hohler
- 1970 Gerold Späth
- 1972 Paul Nizon, Jürg Acklin
- 1973 Hans Ulrich Lehmann
- 1974 Silvio Blatter
- 1975 Beat Brechbühl
- 1976 Rolf Hörler
- 1979 Alice Vollenweider
- 1980 Hermann Burger, Franz Böni, Werner Bodinek
- 1981 Jürg Altherr
- 1983 Jürg Amann
- 1984 Hansjörg Schertenleib
- 1985 Emil Zopfi
- 1986 André Grab
- 1987 Hanna Johansen, Martin Hamburger
- 1988 Iso Camartin
- 1989 Christoph Rütimann
- 1991 Rita Ernst, Dante Andrea Franzetti
- 1992 Thomas David Müller, Peter Sieber
- 1993 Hannes Brunner, Tim Krohn
- 1994 Hans Ulrich Bächtold, Rainer Henrich, Kurt Jakob Rüetschi, Thomas Stalder
- 1995 Daniel Schnyder
- 1996 Urs Frei, Konrad Klotz
- 1997 Perikles Monioudis, Beatrice Maritz
- 1998 Silvia Gertsch, Max Bachmann
- 2017 Veronika Job, Urs Mannhart, Bruno Rauch (Free Opera Company Zürich)
- 2018 Dorothee Elmiger, Simone E. Pfenninger, Tom Emerson
- 2019 Viktoria Dimitrova Popova, Guillaume Bruère, Adrian Gerber
- 2020 Uriel Orlow, Edward Rushton, Islème Sassi
- 2021 Simone Keller, Sebastian Meixner, Julia Weber
- 2022 Louis Delpech, Anna Stern, Ivna Žic
