= Swiss Literary Archives =

Literary archive in Bern, Switzerland

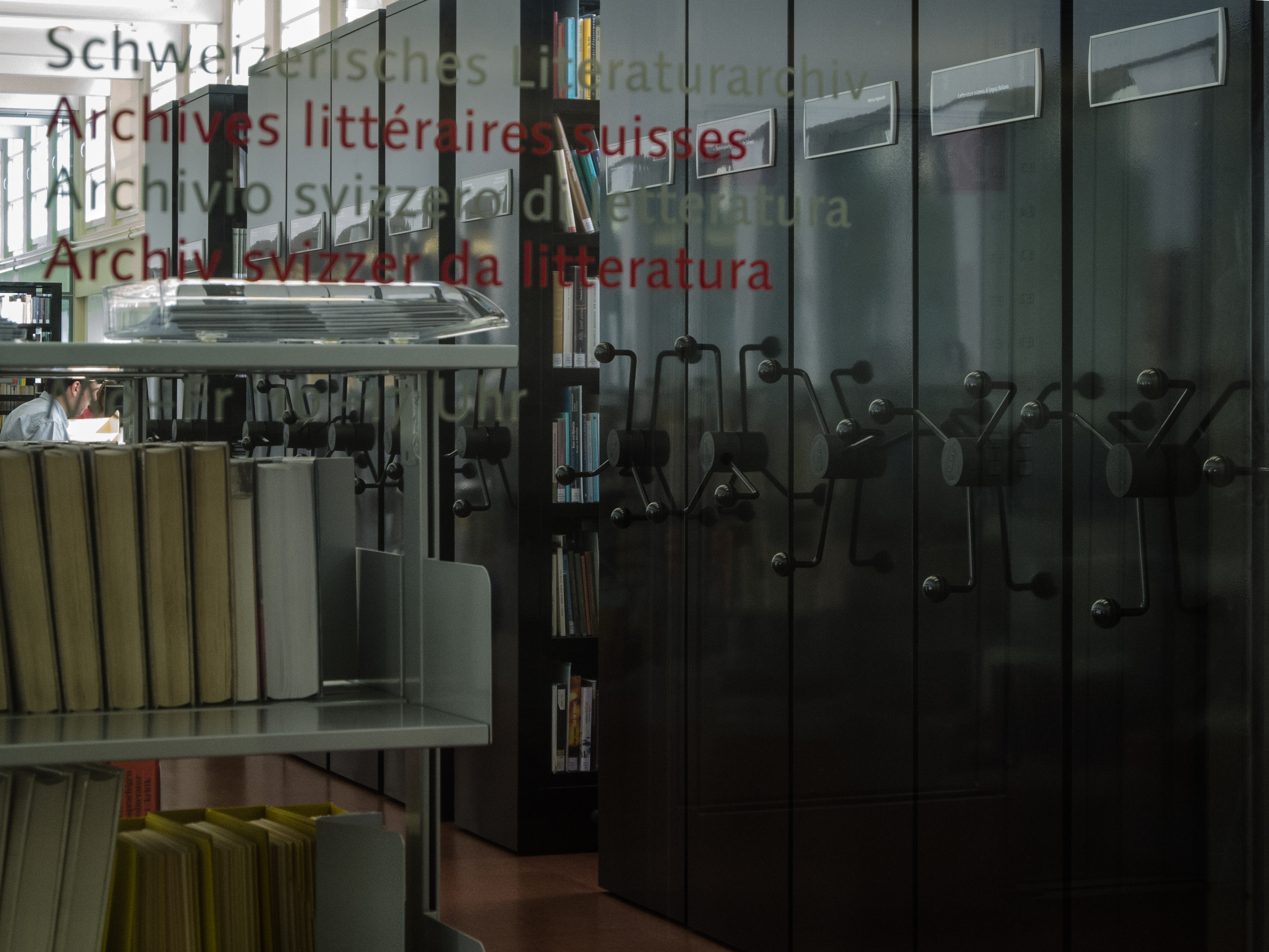
- Interactive map of Swiss Literary Archives
- 46°56′29″N 7°26′59″E
- Location: Bern, Switzerland
- Established: 1991
- Affiliation: Swiss National Library, list of cultural properties in Bern / Kirchenfeld-Schosshalde - South[*]
- Director: Irmgard Wirtz Eyb
- Website: Official website

The Swiss Literary Archives (SLA – Schweizerische Literaturarchiv) in Bern collects literary estates in all four national languages of Switzerland (German, French, Italian and Romansh language). It is part of the Swiss National Library operated by the Federal Office of Culture within the Federal Department of Home Affairs.

The archives were founded in 1991 and are located in the building of the Swiss National Library. The foundation can be tracked back to the last will of the writer Friedrich Dürrenmatt, who died in 1990. Dürrenmatt gave his literary remains to the state, but under the condition that the state establishes a national archive for literature.

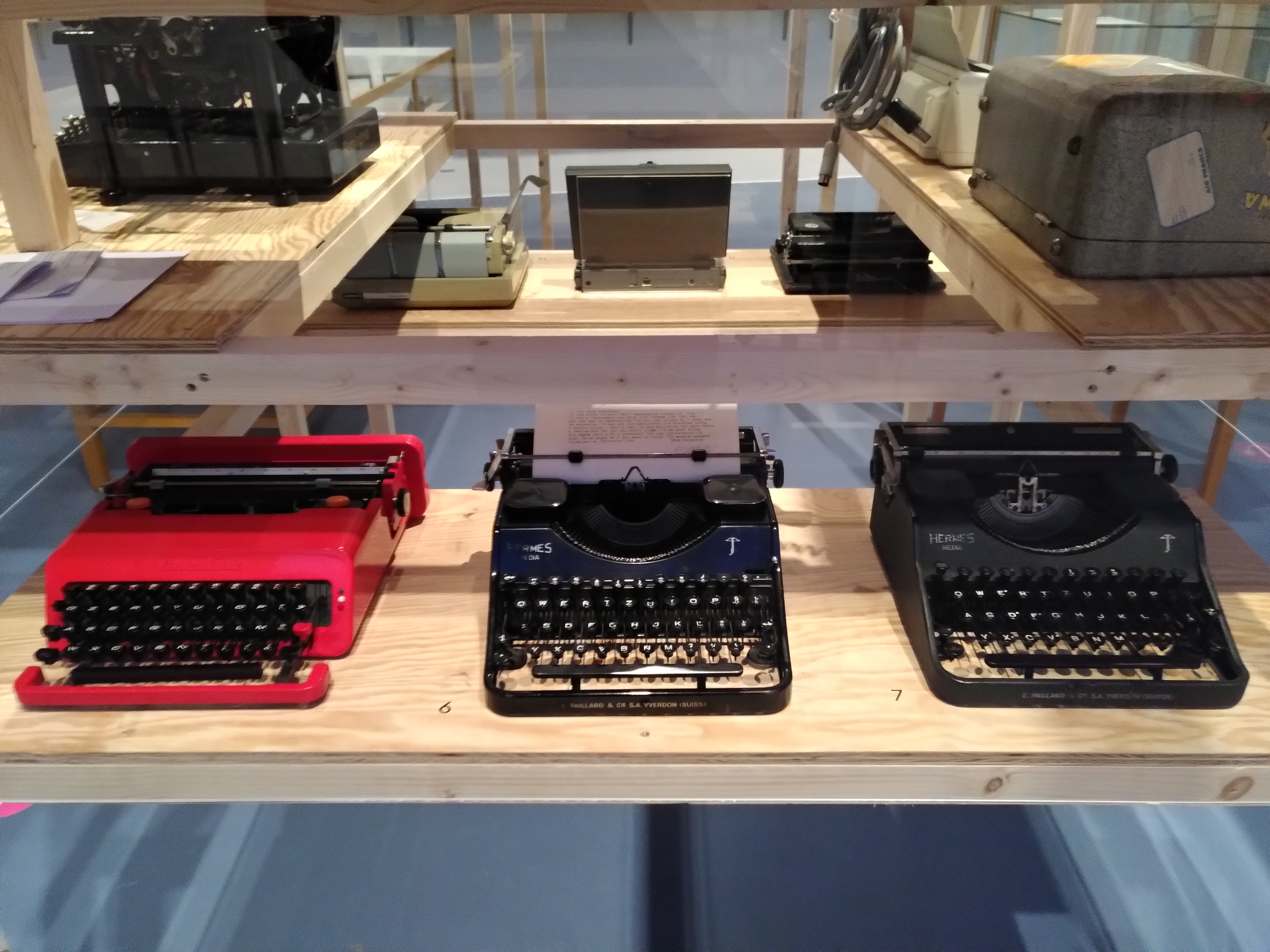
Typewriters of authors in the Swiss Literary Archives

The Swiss Literary Archives today contain around 100 important literary estates and premortal-estates and about 120 partial estates and collections, including material from:

- Peter Bichsel
- Cla Biert
- Hermann Burger
- Erika Burkart
- Blaise Cendrars
- Alice Ceresa
- Jacques Chessex
- Gion Deplazes
- Albert Einstein
- Heinrich Federer
- Anna Felder
- Jean Gebser
- Friedrich Glauser
- Eveline Hasler
- Hermann Hesse
- Patricia Highsmith
- Ludwig Hohl
- Urs Jaeggi
- Walther Kauer
- Peider Lansel
- Hugo Loetscher
- Lorenz Lotmar
- Golo Mann
- Grytzko Mascioni
- Mani Matter
- Mariella Mehr
- Niklaus Meienberg
- Adolf Muschg
- Alberto Nessi
- Paul Nizon
- Giovanni Orelli
- Erica Pedretti
- Andri Peer
- Josef Reinhart
- Rainer Maria Rilke
- Isolde Schaad
- Hendri Spescha
- Annemarie Schwarzenbach
- Carl Spitteler
- Verena Stefan
- Beat Sterchi
- Walter Vogt
- Otto F. Walter
- Silja Walter
- Jean Starobinski
- Étienne Barilier
- Georges Poulet
- Georges Borgeaud
- Roger Dragonetti
- Agota Kristof
- Maurice Chappaz
- S. Corinna Bille
- Gonzague de Reynold

== See also ==
- Swiss literature
