= Jean-Louis de Rambures =

French journalist (1930–2006)

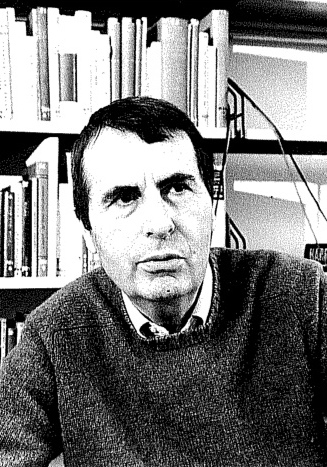
- Born: 19 May 1930; Paris, France
- Died: 20 May 2006 (aged 76); Vaudricourt, Somme, France

Jean-Louis Vicomte de Bretizel Rambures (French: [ʁɑ̃byʁ]; 19 May 1930 – 20 May 2006) was a French journalist, author, translator of literature, literary critic, and cultural attaché. He introduced contemporary German literature to a broader French audience by interviewing German authors, translating and discussing them in Le Monde. He also contributed to the rapprochement of the French and the Germans as head of the Institut Français, e.g. in Frankfurt.

== Life ==
His parents were Lucille Calogera, from Brazil, and her husband, Vicomte Bernard de Bretizel Rambures from Picardy, France. Besides learning both their languages, Portuguese and French, he was also taught German at a very early age and acquired a taste for German literature, which he was to study later. He went to school in Toulouse and Paris and then enrolled at the Institut d'Études Politiques in Paris, where he earned a diploma, a "Licence en droit" and a "Licence d´allemand". He learned to speak English fluently; and also studied German literature at the university of Tübingen (in the province of Baden-Württemberg, Germany). In 1958 he started writing for the monthly magazine "Réalités", portraying famous artists, as e.g. Herbert von Karajan, Karlheinz Stockhausen, Luchino Visconti et al. From 1968 on he contributed to the art magazine Connaissances des Arts, to L'Express and the daily Le Monde, that was to print his articles for the following 25 years. He developed a special interest in the way authors work and analysed the genesis of literature. In the course of several years he contacted numerous contemporary writers, and many of them agreed to grant him an interview, Roland Barthes, Julien Gracq, Jean-Marie Gustave Le Clézio, Hélène Cixous, Herta Müller, Ernst Jünger, Thomas Bernhard, Günter Grass and Heinrich Böll, among others. These talks were printed in Le Monde and a selection was presented in his book Comment travaillent les écrivains (How writers work, Flammarion, Paris 1978), which was translated into Japanese and published in Tokyo (Chuokoron-sha, 1979).

In the early 1970s de Rambures was a cultural attaché for his country in Bonn. In 1975 he began working for the culture department of the French Ministry of Foreign Affairs. From 1987 to 1995 he headed the Institut Français (the French equivalent of the British Council), first in Saarbrücken, then in Frankfurt. He translated German literature into French, e.g. Paul Nizon, who thus became known in France.

== Awards ==
Jean-Louis de Rambures was made a Chevalier des Arts et des Lettres and was honoured with the Cross of Merit of the Federal Republic of Germany.

== Works ==
- "Comment travaillent les écrivains" ("How writers work", Flammarion, Paris 1978)
