= Hanna Johansen =

Swiss author (1939–2023)

- Born: 17 June 1939; Bremen, Gau Weser-Ems, Nazi Germany
- Died: 25 April 2023 (aged 83); Horgen, Switzerland
- Occupation: Author
- Spouse: Adolf Muschg

Hanna Johansen (born Hanna Margarete Meyer; 17 June 1939 – 25 April 2023) was a Swiss writer.

Johansen studied classical philology, education and German studies at the Universities of Marburg and Göttingen. From 1967 to 1969 she lived in Ithaca, New York, and in 1972 she moved with her then husband Adolf Muschg to Kilchberg, Zürich, where she still lived.

Johansen began her literary career as a translator of American avant garde authors, and soon moved on to original work, particularly stories for children. She published her first novel in 1978. She was a member of PEN Switzerland and of the Deutschen Akademie für Sprache und Dichtung in Darmstadt.

Johansen died on 25 April 2023, at the age of 83 in Horgen.

== Prizes ==
- 1980 Ehrengabe des Kantons Zürich
- 1986 Marie-Luise-Kaschnitz-Preis
- 1987 Conrad-Ferdinand-Meyer-Preis (together with Martin Hamburger)
- 1990 Schweizerischer Jugendbuchpreis
- 1991 Kinderbuchpreis des Landes Nordrhein-Westfalen
- 1993 Österreichischer Kinder- und Jugendbuchpreis
- 1993 Literaturpreis des Landes Kärnten beim Ingeborg-Bachmann-Wettbewerb
- 1993 Phantastik-Preis der Stadt Wetzlar for Über den Himmel
- 2003 Solothurner Literaturpreis
- 2007 Anerkennungsgabe der Stadt Zürich

== Works ==
- Die stehende Uhr, 1978
- Jan und die Großmutter, 1978 (as Hanna Muschg, with Gisela Degler-Rummel)
- Ein Meister des Innehaltens, 1979
- Trocadero, 1980
- Die Analphabetin, 1982
- Auf dem Lande, Hörspiel, NDR, 1982
- Bruder Bär und Schwester Bär, 1983 (as Hanna Muschg)
- Die Ente und die Eule, 1984 (as Hanna Muschg)
- Siebenschläfergeschichten, 1985 (as Hanna Muschg)
- Über den Wunsch, sich wohlzufühlen, 1985
- Zurück nach Oraibi, 1986
- Felis Felis, 1987
- Ein Mann vor der Tür, 1988
- Die Geschichte von der kleinen Gans, die nicht schnell genug war, 1989
- Die Schöne am unteren Bildrand, 1990
- Dinosaurier gibt es nicht, 1992
- Über den Himmel, 1993
- Kurnovelle, 1994
- Ein Maulwurf kommt immer allein, 1994
- Der Füsch, 1995 (with Rotraut Susanne Berner)
- Die Hexe zieht den Schlafsack enger, 1995 (with Käthi Bhend)
- Universalgeschichte der Monogamie, 1997
- Der Zigarettenanzünder, Hörspiel, SWF, 1997
- Bist du schon wach?, 1998 (with Rotraut Susanne Berner)
- Halbe Tage, ganze Jahre, 1998
- Vom Hühnchen, das goldene Eier legen wollte, 1998 (with Käthi Bhend)
- Maus, die Maus, liest ein langes Buch, 2000 (with Klaus Zumbühl)
- Maus, die Maus, liest und liest, 2000 (with Klaus Zumbühl)
- Sei doch mal still!, 2001
- Lena, 2002
- "Omps!" – ein Dinosaurier zu viel, 2003
- Die Hühneroper, Zürich, Nagel & Kimche, 2004
- Ich bin hier bloß die Katze, 2007
- Der schwarze Schirm, 2007
- Ein Krokodil
