= Petrarca-Preis =

- Country: Administered from Germany, for Europe
- Presented by: Hubert Burda (Founder)
- Reward: €20,000 (Could be shared)
- Established: 1975

Petrarca-Preis was a European literary and translation award named after the Italian Renaissance poet Francesco Petrarca or Petrarch. Founded in 1975 by German art historian and publisher Hubert Burda, it was primarily designed for contemporary European poets, but some occasional non-Europeans appear in the list of laureates.

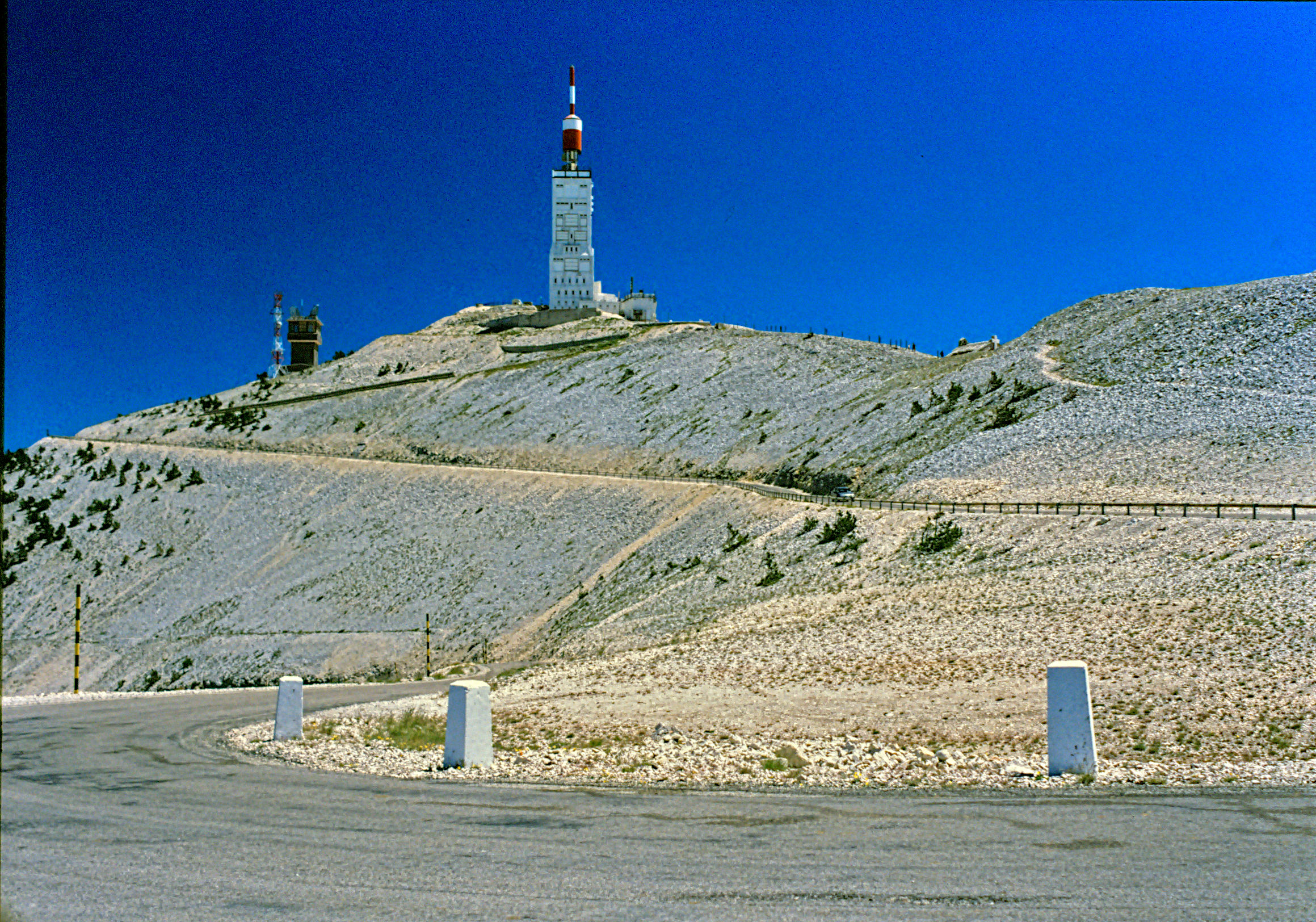
Southside limestone summit of Mont Ventoux.

The award was first distributed over a twenty-year period (1975–95) and included the categories Literature and Translation. Then it was followed for a decade (1999–2009) by a Hermann-Lenz-Preis and resumed in 2010. The first jury consisted of fluxus participant Bazon Brock, poets Michael Krüger and Nicolas Born, and novelist Peter Handke. When the prize resumed in 2010, Peter Handke and Michael Krüger still were on the jury, together with the authors Alfred Kolleritsch (himself awarded in 1978) and Peter Hamm. "We want to support a national and regional culture in Europe", founder Hubert Burda initially said at the 2011 awards. An explicit goal was to watch out all over Europe for authors who gave a distinctive voice to their prevailing culture. The Petrarca-Preis consisted of €20,000, and it could be shared between several winners. The ceremony was usually held in places which Francesco Petrarch at some point visited.

== Literature prize-winners and ceremony locations ==
- 1975 Rolf Dieter Brinkmann (posthumously), Mont Ventoux
- 1976 Sarah Kirsch and Ernst Meister, Arquà Petrarca
- 1977 Herbert Achternbusch (who declined), Arquà Petrarca
- 1978 Alfred Kolleritsch, Siena
- 1979 Zbigniew Herbert, Verona
- 1980 Ludwig Hohl, Florence
- 1981 Tomas Tranströmer, Vicenza
- 1982 Ilse Aichinger, Sils Maria
- 1983 Gerhard Meier, Vézelay
- 1984 Gustav Januš, Avignon
- 1987 Hermann Lenz, Asolo
- 1988 Philippe Jaccottet, Trieste
- 1989 Jan Skácel, Lucca
- 1990 Paul Wühr, Siena
- 1991 John Berger, Piemonte
- 1992 Michael Hamburger, Modena
- 1993 Gennadij Ajgi, Perugia
- 1994 Helmut Färber, Weimar
- 1995 Les Murray, Provence
- 2010 Pierre Michon and Erri De Luca, Salem Abbey
- 2011 John Burnside and Florjan Lipuš, Benediktbeuern Abbey
- 2012 Miodrag Pavlović and Kito Lorenc, Marbach am Neckar
- 2013 Adonis and Robin Robertson, München
- 2014 Franz Mon and Tomas Venclova, Bayerisches Nationalmuseum, München

== Translator Award ==
- 1987 Hanno Helbling
- 1988 Georg Rudolf Lind
- 1989 Felix Philipp Ingold
- 1990 Fabjan Hafner
- 1991 Ilma Rakusa
- 1993 Hanns Grössel
- 1994 Elisabeth Edl and Wolfgang Matz
- 1995 Verena Reichel
