= Jacques Chessex =

Swiss author and painter

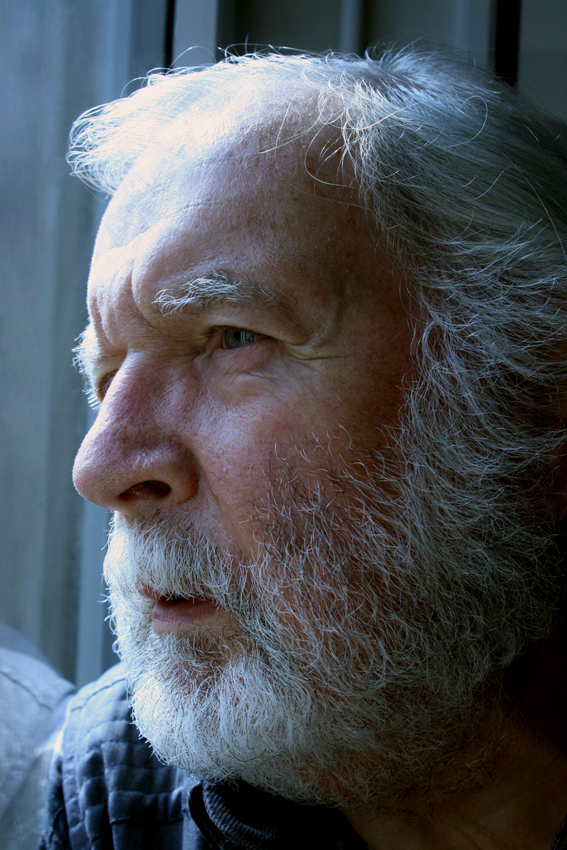

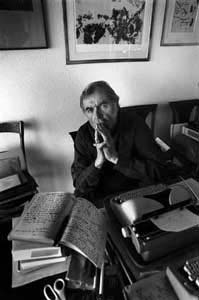

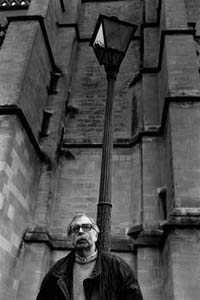

Jacques Chessex (Payerne, 1 March 1934 – Yverdon-les-Bains, 9 October 2009) was a Swiss author and painter.

== Biography ==
Chessex was born in 1934 in Payerne. From 1951 to 1953, he studied at Collège Saint-Michel in Fribourg, before undertaking literature studies in Lausanne. In 1953, he co-founded the literary review Pays du Lac in Pully. In 1956, Chessex's father committed suicide, making a lasting impression on him. He completed his studies in 1960.

In 1963, Chessex was awarded the Schiller Prize for La Tête ouverte. The next year, he co-founded the literary review Écriture in Lausanne. From 1969, he held a position as a French literature professor in the Gymnase de la Cité in Lausanne.

In 1972, he was awarded the Alpes-Jura prize. The next year, he obtained the Prix Goncourt for the novel L'Ogre. It was translated by Martin Sokolinsky and published in 1975 under the title A Father's Love and reissued in 2012 under a new title The Tyrant. In 1992, he obtained the Mallarmé Prize for poetry for Les Aveugles du seul regard, as well as the Grand Prize of the Fondation Vaudoise pour la création artistique. In 1999, he was awarded the Grand Prix de la langue française, and the Goncourt poetry grant for Allegria.

In 2007, he was awarded the Grand Prix Jean Giono for his entire work.

One of Chessex's last books A Jew Must Die (Un Juif pour l'exemple), published 2008, focussed on the 1942 death of cattle trader Arthur Bloch, who was killed by Swiss Nazis in Chessex's home town of Payerne. The novel, like others in his back catalogue, was not warmly received in Switzerland. A play adapted from his 1967 novel The Confession of Father Burg had just had its premiere the night before his death.

Chessex suffered a heart attack and collapsed during a public discussion in Yverdon-les-Bains on 9 October 2009 about a play The Confession of Father Burg, and about his support for Roman Polanski (who was arrested in September 2009 by Swiss police because of his outstanding U.S. warrant when he entered the country to accept a Lifetime Achievement Award at the Zurich Film Festival). He died shortly thereafter. His literary estate is archived in the Swiss Literary Archives in Bern.

== Works ==
=== Poetry ===
- Le Jour proche, Aux Miroirs partagés, Lausanne, 1954.
- Chant de printemps, Jeune Poésie, Genève, 1955.
- Une Voix la nuit, Mermod, Lausanne, 1957.
- Batailles dans l'air (1957–1959), Mermod, 1959.
- Le Jeûne de huit nuits, Payot, Lausanne, 1966.
- L'Ouvert obscur, L'Age d'Homme, Lausanne, 1967.
- Elégie soleil du regret, Bertil Galland, Vevey, 1976.
- Le Calviniste, Grasset, Paris, 1983.
- Pierre Estoppey, Le Verseau, Lausanne, 1986.
- Myriam, PAP, Pully, 1987.
- Comme l'os, Grasset, 1988.
- Dans la Page brumeuse du sonnet, PAP, 1989.
- Elégie de Pâques, PAP, 1989.
- Neige, Stamperia del Portico, Gavirate, 1989.
- Si l'Arc des coqs, PAP, 1989.
- Plaie ravie, PAP, 1989.
- Les Aveugles du seul regard, PAP, 1991. Autre édition: La Différence, Paris, 1992.
- Le Buisson, Atelier de St-Prex, 1991.
- Songe du Corps élémentaire, Simecek et Ditesheim, Lausanne et Neuchâtel, 1992.
- La Fente, Atelier de St-Prex, 1993.
- Le Rire dans la faille, Le Manoir, Martigny, 1993.
- Les Elégies de Yorick, Bernard Campiche, Yvonand, 1994.
- Le Temps sans Temps, Le Cherche-Midi, Paris, 1995.
- Cantique, poésie, Bernard Campiche, 1996.
- Poésie, 3 vol. (L'œuvre), Bernard Campiche, 1997.
- Le désir de la neige, Grasset, 2002.
- Allegria, Grasset, 2005.
- Revanche des purs, Grasset, 2008.

=== Novels ===
- La Tête ouverte, Gallimard, Paris, 1962.
- La Confession du pasteur Burg, Christian Bourgois, Paris, 1967.
- Carabas, Grasset, Paris, 1971.
- L'Ogre, Grasset, 1973. Prix Goncourt
- L'Ardent royaume, Grasset, 1975.
- Les Yeux jaunes, Grasset, 1979.
- Judas le transparent, Grasset, 1982.
- Jonas, Grasset, 1987.
- Morgane madrigal, Grasset, 1990.
- La Trinité, Grasset, 1992.
- Le rêve de Voltaire, Grasset, 1995.
- La mort d'un juste Grasset, 1996.
- L'imitation, Grasset, 1998.
- Portrait d'une ombre, Zoé, Genève, 1999
- Incarnata, Grasset, 1999
- Monsieur, Grasset, 2001
- L'economie du Ciel, Grasset, 2003
- L'Eternel sentit une odeur agréable, Grasset, 2004
- Avant le Matin, Grasset 2006
- Le Vampire de Ropraz, Grasset, 2007
- Pardon mère, Grasset, 2008
- Un Juif pour l'exemple, Grasset, 2009
- Le Dernier crâne de M. de Sade, Grasset, 2010

=== Short stories ===
- Le Séjour des morts, Grasset, 1977.
- Où vont mourir les oiseaux, Grasset, 1980.
- Sosie d'un saint, Grasset, 2000.

=== Epics ===
- Reste avec nous, Cahier de La Renaissance Vaudoise, 1967. reprinted : Bernard Campiche, 1995.
- Portrait des Vaudois, 1969. Collection Babel N°20
- Feux d'orées, 1984; reprinted. Bernard Campiche, 1995.
- Dans la buée de ses yeux, Bernard Campiche, 1995.
- L'imparfait, Bernard Campiche, 1996.
- De l'encre et du papier, La Bibliothèque des arts, 2001 (Pergamine)

=== Children books ===
- Le Renard qui disait non à la lune, Grasset, 1974.
- Marie et le chat sauvage, Grasset, 1979.
- Neuf, l'œuf, Grasset, 1990.
- François dans la forêt, Grasset, 1991.

=== Editorials ===
- Charles-Albert Cingria, Seghers, Paris, 1967. reprinted: Poche Suisse, 2007.
- Les saintes Écritures, Bertil Galland, 1972.
- Bréviaire, Bertil Galland, 1976.
- Adieu à Gustave Roud, with Maurice Chappaz and Philippe Jaccottet, Bertil Galland, 1977.
- Entretiens avec Jacques Chessex, Jérôme Garcin, La Différence, 1979.
- Maupassant et les autres, Ramsay, Paris, 1981.
- Flaubert, ou Le Désert en abîme, Grasset, 1991.
- Avez-vous déjà giflé un rat?, Bernard Campiche, 1997.
- Le désir de dieu, Grasset, 2005.
- Le simple préserve l'énigme, Gallimard, 2008.

=== Editorials on painting ===
- La Muerte y la Nada (Antonio Saura), Pierre Canova, Pully, 1990.
- Zao Wou-Ki, Galerie Jan Krugier, Genève, 1990.
- Marcel Poncet, La Bibliothèque des Arts, Lausanne, 1992.
- Olivier Charles, Musée Jenisch, Vevey, 1992.
- Bazaine, Skira, Paris, 1996.
- Figures de la métamorphose, La Bibliothèque des Arts, 1999.
- Le dernier des monstres (Saura), Cuadernos del Hocinoco, Cuenca, 2000.
- Notes sur Saura, Cuadernos del Hocinoco, 2001.
- Les dangers de Jean Lecoultre, Cuadernos del Hocinoco, 2002.
- Javier Pagola, Cuadernos del Hocinoco, 2004.
- Thomas Fougeirol, Operae, 2004.
- Dans la peinture de Sarto, Atelier de St-Prex et Chabloz, Lausanne, 2008.
- Une nuit dans la forêt illustrations by Manuel Müller, Notari, Genève, 2009.
- Jean Lecoultre ou la haine de la peinture, in Artpassions, n°19, 2009.

== Honours ==
- Arts et des Lettres
- Legion of Honour
