= Herbert Meier =

Swiss writer and translator (1928–2018)

- Born: 29 August 1928; Solothurn, Switzerland
- Died: 21 September 2018 (aged 90)
- Education: University of Basel; University of Vienna; University of Paris; University of Fribourg
- Occupations: Writer, translator

Herbert Meier (29 August 1928 – 21 September 2018) was a Swiss writer and translator.

Meier studied literature, history of art and philosophy at the universities of Basel, Vienna, Paris and Fribourg.

Since 1955, Meier was a freelance writer in Zurich. He won the Conrad-Ferdinand-Meyer-Preis in 1964. The main component of his work was translating classical and modern theatre plays from French to German (authors such as Paul Claudel and Georges Schehadé).

== Sources ==
- Biography at felix-bloch-erben.de (in German)
