= Ludwig Hohl =

Swiss writer

- Born: 9 April 1904; Netstal, Switzerland
- Died: 3 November 1980 (aged 76)
- Occupation: Writer
- Writing career
- Language: German
- Notable awards: Robert Walser Centenary Prize (1978); Petrarca-Preis (1980)

Ludwig Hohl (9 April 1904 – 3 November 1980) was a Swiss writer writing in the German language. Outside of literary mainstream, he spent most of his life in extreme poverty. He is largely unknown to a wider public but has been praised by several well-known authors for his writing and his radical thinking about life and literature.

== Biography ==
Hohl was the son of a pastor and his wife Magdalena, née Zweifel, daughter of the paper manufacturer Zweifel in the small town of Netstal and sister of the later National Councilor (1943 - 1946) and company successor Ludwig Zweifel (1888 - 1953).

Hohl was born in Netstal and went to the gymnasium in Frauenfeld. He was expelled due to the alleged bad influence he had on other students. He never worked in an ordinary profession and spent most of his life in poverty suffering from alcoholism. From 1924 to 1937 he lived outside of Switzerland, first in Paris and Marseille (1924–1930), then in Vienna (1930/31) and the Hague (1931–1937), due to a falling out with his parents after which he went into this self-imposed exile. He then returned to Switzerland and lived first in Biel, then in Geneva, from 1954 to 1974 in a small basement flat which became legendary. His financial situation then improved due to an inheritance, but in his last years, he suffered from several physical illnesses. Hohl died in 1980 from an inflammation of his legs. He was married five times, including to the painter Hanny Fries, and had one daughter, Adele (born 1949), with his third wife Heidi Antoine. He is buried in the Cimetière des Rois with his last wife, Madeleine Hohl-de Weiss (1916-1993).

Hohl's works never gained him commercial success; he published several himself. His small income came from writing for magazines and newspapers as well as private and public support. In the 1940s and 50s, he took legal action against his publisher who refused to print the second volume of his Notizen (see below) because the first volume had sold less than two hundred copies. Hohl won – which, according to some sources, substantially improved the position of authors versus publishers in Swiss jurisdiction – but the second volume sold equally badly. In the 1970s, he finally achieved some recognition from the literary world. Siegfried Unseld, head of the renowned German publishing house Suhrkamp Verlag, had been introduced to Hohl by Adolf Muschg, and Unseld and Hohl agreed on a contract for a new edition of Hohl's works. In 1970 and 1976, Hohl was awarded prizes by the Schweizerische Schillerstiftung, in 1978 he received a special prize dedicated to the 100th anniversary of Robert Walser's birth, and in 1980 he won the Petrarca-Preis. Hohl's literary estate is archived in the Swiss Literary Archives in Bern.

== Works ==
Hohl published some poems and stories. His best work of fiction may be the narrative Bergfahrt (the German word Bergfahrt, literary mountain ride, is an old term for climbing), which he wrote in 1926, rewrote several times over the next decades and which was finally published in 1975. An English edition of this novella, called Ascent, was published in 2012; it is the first English translation of one of Hohl's works.

Many regard Die Notizen oder Von der unvoreiligen Versöhnung as Hohl's opus magnum (translated as The Notes, or: On Non-Premature Reconciliation). Hohl wrote it in 1934–36; problems with his publisher (see above) delayed the publication until 1954; it was re-published, with some additions and in one volume, in 1981, a few months after his death. The volume is divided into twelve parts (with titles like 'On Working', 'On Writing', 'On Death') which consist of hundreds of numbered 'notes' in the form of short essays, aphorisms, quotations, poems, outlines for stories etc. Hohl insisted that these notes are not a disparate collection but have a deep inner connection. The main thought which lies behind them is that there is only one true meaning of life, namely to exercise one's own creative forces. This is what Hohl calls 'Arbeit' (work). This 'work' includes the philosophical concepts of knowledge and action, which become one in the person who works. Hohl also polemizes against the masses of people who do not 'work' in this way, but are very busy trying to 'avoid' such true work. Hohl personifies this flawed way of life in his antagonist, 'der Apotheker' (the pharmacist) or 'Herr Meier' (Mr. Average).

A second volume with similar format was not published until after Hohl's death. It is called 'Von den hereinbrechenden Rändern' ('On the margins closing in') or simply 'Nachnotizen' ('After-notes').

Hohl often quotes the few authors and thinkers he held in highest esteem. They include Goethe, Lichtenberg, Montaigne and Spinoza. He called Goethe's writings his 'daily bread'. Hohl's opinion was that many good things had already been said, and that he would not be able to improve on the way in which those thinkers had said them, but that it was important to re-think them for oneself.

Hohl dismissed most literature because it was not the product of 'work'. Among the few writers he praised are Honoré de Balzac, Marcel Proust, Karl Kraus, and Katherine Mansfield.

== Works in translation ==
- Ascent, trans. Donna Stonecipher. Black Square Editions: 2012. ISBN 978-0-9860050-1-5
- The Notes, or: On Non-Premature Reconciliation, trans. Tess Lewis. Yale University Press: 2021. ISBN 978-0-300-22005-6

== Influence ==
As of 2016, Hohl's influence remains extremely limited. Most of his works are out of print. However, there have been several authors who have praised Hohl's writing, including the Swiss authors Friedrich Dürrenmatt, Max Frisch and Adolf Muschg as well as the Austrian writer Peter Handke.
