= Der Rote Ritter =

1993 novel by Adolf Muschg

- Author: Adolf Muschg
- Language: German
- Publisher: Suhrkamp Verlag
- Publication date: 1993
- Publication place: Germany
- Pages: 1006
- ISBN: 9783518405130

Der Rote Ritter. Eine Geschichte von Parzivâl (lit. 'The Red Knight: A Story of Parzivâl') is a 1993 novel by the Swiss writer Adolf Muschg. It is a playful and unfaithful retelling of the medieval romance Parzival by Wolfram von Eschenbach. It is frequently described as postmodernist, features a series of different narrators and places great emphasis on the degrees of literacy of its characters. The book is over 1000 pages long and the last, 100th chapter is entirely blank and titled "Der Leser" (lit. 'The Reader'), indicating that the reader is supposed to be the final narrator.
