= 7×7 Tales of a Sevensleeper =

1985 book by Hanna Johansen

- First edition (German)
- Author: Hanna Johansen
- Original title: Siebenschläfergeschichten
- Translator: Christopher Franceschelli (US edition); Marion Koenig (UK edition)
- Illustrator: Käthi Bhend
- Cover artist: Kathi Bhend
- Language: German
- Genre: Children's fiction
- Publisher: Verlag Nagel & Kimche
- Publication date: 1985
- Publication place: Switzerland
- English publication date: United States: 1989 (by E. P. Dutton/Penguin Books); United Kingdom: 1990 (by Faber and Faber)
- Media type: Hardcover
- Pages: 95
- ISBN: 0-525-44491-2

7×7 Tales of a Sevensleeper (German: Siebenschläfergeschichten) is a 1985 children's book written by Hanna Johansen.

== Synopsis ==
Much to his brother's and parents' dismay, a boy's obsession over the habits of his favourite animals—squirrel-like creatures called "sevensleepers"—makes him pretend he is one of them. The number seven figures in his daily routines throughout the course of 49 stories: he becomes that age early on in the book, with as many presents to match; he goes to bed every night at seven o'clock; and he even eats or owns things in groups of seven. This trait even helps him follow the week more efficiently than months or years, which are both far longer.

== Publishing history ==
Siebenschläfergeschichten, the original German version of 7×7 Tales of a Sevensleeper, was published in 1985 by the Swiss company Nagel & Kimche. A Dutch edition, titled De zevenslaper and translated by Erna Borawitz, came out through the Christofoor imprint a year later. In the Iberian realm, the book was translated into Spanish by Lola Romero (as 1987's Cuentos de lirones), and in Portuguese as Histórias de Sete-Sonos in 1991. The Penguin subsidiary E. P. Dutton released an English translation for the US market (by Christopher Franceschelli) in 1989; a British version, by Marion Koenig, appeared through Faber and Faber a year later.

== Reception ==
Colin Mills of Britain's The Guardian noted that "the writer [Johansen] is skilled in pithy observation" throughout the "49 witty, quirky yarns" comprising Tales of a Sevensleeper. "There is word-play, good natural history," he added, "and the pictures by Kathi Bhend, some cartoon format, some intricate miniatures, are unusually integral." Another British publication, The School Librarian, said of the book: "Despite an ambiguous opening [...], it is a clever work of imagination". Carolyn Phelan commented likewise in an issue of Booklist: "While the whimsical prose will strike some readers as too precious, others will find its brand of imagination engaging." Tatiana Castleton, a Californian librarian, wrote in the School Library Journal that this "unusual and intriguing little book [is] not for everyone, but made to order for lap and read-aloud sessions with the right listener." She praised Franceschelli's prose as "beautiful", and Bhend's illustrations "endlessly inventive and fascinating."
