= Gustave Roud =

French-speaking Swiss poet and photographer

Gustave Roud (French pronunciation: [ɡystav ʁu]; April 20, 1897 – November 10, 1976) was a French-speaking Swiss poet and photographer.

== Biography ==
Roud was born in 1897 in Saint-Légier, in the canton of Vaud. In 1908, Roud, along with his parents and sister, moved to a farm in Carrouge inherited from his maternal grandfather. He would spend the rest of his life living there. In high school Roud studied classics and took classes with the renowned Swiss conductor Ernest Ansermet and the Swiss-French writer Edmond Gilliard. Roud went on to study classics at the University of Lausanne, where he obtained his licence ès lettres (equivalent to a Bachelor of Arts). During this time, he translated the poems of Hölderlin, Novalis, and Rilke, while also actively participating in a number of literary journals.

While living a solitary life in his family farm at Carrouge, Roud maintained numerous friendships with artists, poets, and other intellectuals such as Charles Ferdinand Ramuz, Ernest Ansermet, and René Auberjonois, Maurice Chappaz. Roud was also a mentor to the young Philippe Jaccottet, who would later become one of Switzerland's most accomplished poets. He was gay, but struggled with his identity his whole life, as hinted at in his poetry and extensive diaries.

Considered one of the greatest poets of Romandy, Roud attempts in his poetry, which is dedicated to the landscapes of the Haut-Jorat, to reach a perception of an "elsewhere" or of a lost paradise. His most famous work is "Air de la solitude".

Following his death in 1976 in Moudon, the "Association des Amis de Gustave Roud" (The Friends of Gustave Roud Association) was formed and since 1982 has published a number of unedited texts in their series "Cahiers Gustave Roud". 26 years after Roud died, a selection of his works was published by Éditions Gallimard under the "Collection de Poche Poésie" imprint, featuring an introduction by Philippe Jaccottet. Roud's correspondence with the younger poet was also published by the press.

He was also a prolific photographer, with about 13.000 photographs to his name, mostly of landscapes and male farmers at work.

== Works ==
=== Published during his lifetime ===
- Adieu, Lausanne, Au Verseau, 1927. Rééd. Porrentruy, Aux Portes de France, 1944.
- Feuillets, Lausanne, Mermod, 1929.
- Essai pour un paradis, Lausanne, Mermod, 1932.
- Petit traité de la marche en plaine suivie de lettres, dialogues et morceaux, Lausanne, Mermod, 1932.
- Pour un moissonneur, Lausanne, Mermod, 1941.
- Air de la solitude, Lausanne, Mermod, 1945.
- Haut-Jorat, Lausanne, Éditions des Terreaux, 1949 - rééd. Fata Morgana, 2011.
- Ecrits I, II, Lausanne, Mermod, 1950.
- Le Repos du cavalier, Lausanne, Bibliothèque des Arts, 1958.
- Requiem, Lausanne, Payot, 1967.
- Campagne perdue, Lausanne, Bibliothèque des Arts, 1972.

=== Posthumous works ===
- Trois poèmes anciens, Montpellier, Fata Morgana, 1976
- Écrits I, II, III, Lausanne, Bibliothèque des Arts, 1978
- Journal, éd. Philippe Jaccottet, Vevey, Bertil Galland, 1982
- Essai pour un paradis; Petit traité de la marche en plaine, Lausanne, L’Âge d’Homme, Poche Suisse, 1984
- Air de la solitude, Montpellier, Fata Morgana, 1988
- Les Fleurs et les saisons, Genève, La Dogana, 1991
- Air de la solitude; Campagne perdue, preface by Jacques Chessex, Lausanne, L’Âge d’Homme, Poche Suisse, 1995
- Adieu; Requiem, postface de Claire Jaquier, Genève, Minizoé, 1997
- Hommage, Toute puissance de la poésie (Scène), Paris, La Triplette Infernale, 1997
- Halte en juin, gravures de Gérard de Palézieux, afterword by Claire Jaquier, Montpellier, Fata Morgana, 2001
- Image sans emploi, engravings by G. de Palézieux, Montpellier, Fata Morgana, 2002
- Air de la solitude et autres écrits, preface by Philippe Jaccottet, Paris, Poésie/Gallimard, 2002
- Journal, Carnets, cahiers et feuillets, 1916-1971, eds. Anne-Lise Delacrétaz and Claire Jaquier, Moudon, Empreintes, 2004

=== Correspondence ===
- Albert Béguin – Gustave Roud, Lettres sur le romantisme allemand, éd. Françoise Fornerod et Pierre Grotzer, Lausanne, Études de Lettres, 1974.
- Henri Pourrat – Gustave Roud, Sur la route des hauts jardins, d’Ambert à Carrouge, éd. Gilbert Guisan et Doris Jakubec, Lausanne, Études de Lettres, 1979.
- Maurice Chappaz - Gustave Roud, Correspondance, 1939 – 1976, éd. Claire Jaquier et Claire de Ribaupierre, Genève, Zoé, 1993.
- Gustave Roud, Lettres à Yves Velan, La Chaux-de-Fonds, [VWA], printemps 1998, pp. 103–138.
- René Auberjonois, Avant les autruches, après les iguanes… Lettres à Gustave Roud, 1922-1954, éd. Doris Jakubec et Claire de Ribaupierre Furlan, Lausanne, Payot, 1999.
- Philippe Jaccottet – Gustave Roud, Correspondance 1942-1976, éd. José-Flore Tappy, Paris, Gallimard, 2002.
- Georges Borgeaud – Gustave Roud – Georges Borgeaud, Correspondance 1936-1974, Lausanne et Carrouge, Association des Amis de Gustave Roud, 2008, 136 p.
- Jacques Mercanton Cahiers Gustave Roud, vol. 11, correspondance 1948 - 1972

=== Translations ===
- Poëmes de Hölderlin, Lausanne, Mermod, 1942. Rééd. Lausanne, Bibliothèque des Arts, 2002.
- Rilke, Lettres à un jeune poète, précédées d’Orphée et suivies de deux essais sur la poésie, Lausanne, Mermod, 1947.
- Novalis, Les Disciples à Saïs, Hymnes à la nuit, Journal, Lausanne, Mermod, 1948. Rééd. Lausanne et Montpellier, Bibliothèque des Arts et Fata Morgana, 2002.
- Novalis, Hymnes à la nuit, Albeuve, Castellsa, 1966.
- Georg Trakl, vingt-quatre poèmes, Paris, La Délirante, 1978.

== Honors ==
- Prix de la Société des Ecrivains suisses, 1934.
- Prix Rambert, 1941.
- Prix du Salon neuchâtelois, 1945.
- Prix de la Société des Ecrivains vaudois, 1955.
- Prix de la Ville de Lausanne, 1967.
