= Alfred Kolleritsch =

Austrian writer and poet (1931–2020)

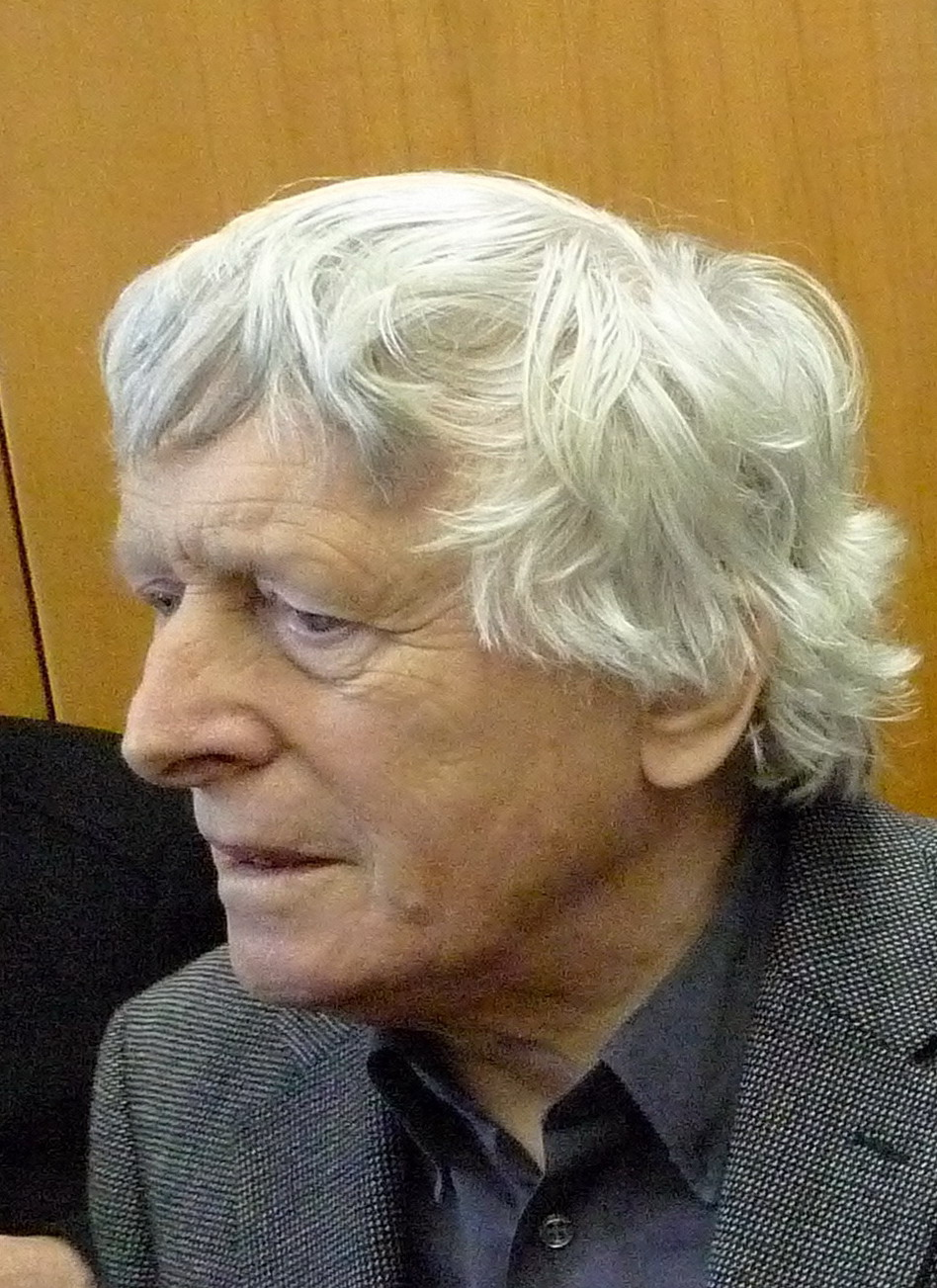
- Born: February 16, 1931; Eichfeld, Austria
- Died: May 29, 2020 (aged 89); Graz
- Occupations: Journalist, poet and philosopher
- Known for: Founder of the literary magazine manuskripte

Alfred Kolleritsch (16 February 1931 – 29 May 2020) was an Austrian journalist, poet and philosopher.

He was born in Eichfeld, Austria. He was the founder of the literary magazine manuskripte. He was the President of the Forum Stadtpark, a cultural center in Graz. He contributes to the Grazer Autorenversammlung. He won the Petrarca-Preis in 1978, and was since 2010 part of the jury.

Kolleritsch died on 29 May 2020 in Graz, aged 89.

== See also ==
- Austrian literature
