= Zepp (surname) =

Zepp or Zepps is the surname of:

- Bill Zepp (born 1946), American retired Major League Baseball pitcher
- Helen D. Zepp (1903–1994), American medical researcher
- Josh Zepps (formerly Josh Szeps), Australian media personality, political satirist and TV show host
- Katrina Zepps (1918–1980), Australian nurse and educator born in the Russian Empire
- Rob Zepp (born 1981), Canadian ice hockey goaltender
