= Maurice Chappaz =

Swiss poet

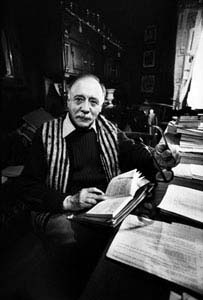
1983

Maurice Chappaz (21 December 1916, in Lausanne – 15 January 2009, in Martigny) was a French-language Swiss poet and writer. He published more than 40 books and won several literary awards, including his country's most notable award, the Grand Prix Schiller, in 1997.

== Biography ==
Born in Lausanne, Maurice Chappaz spent his childhood between Martigny and the abbey of Le Châble, in the Swiss canton of Valais. Born of a family of lawyers and solicitors, nephew of Valaisian secretary of State Maurice Troillet, he studied at Saint-Maurice Abbey High School, then he registered first in Law School at the University of Lausanne, but quickly left it to study littérature in the University of Geneva, which he also left a few months later.

A poet above all, Maurice Chappaz published his first text, Un homme qui vivait couché sur un banc, in December 1939. On that occasion, he was encouraged by Charles-Ferdinand Ramuz and Gustave Roud.

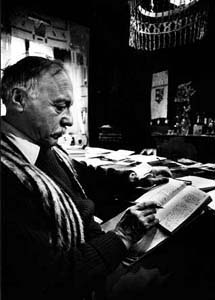
1983

But as of the summer of 1940, World War II put an end to his availability. He thus had to patrol the Swiss borders and published several texts in the review Lettres which were collected in 1944 into Les Grandes Journées de Printemps hailed by Paul Eluard. In 1942, he met S. Corinna Bille, painter Edmond Bille's daughter, whom he married in 1947 and with whom he had three children, Blaise, Achille and Marie-Noëlle. After Corinna's death in 1979, he remarried in 1992, with Michène Caussignac, widow of the travel-writer Lorenzo Pestelli.

After the end of World War II, Maurice Chappaz travelled in Europe. Without any regular occupation and yearning to devote his time to writing, he became an occasional press correspondent while managing his uncle's vineyard in Valais. As he went through serious personal turmoil, he tried new experiences after another and his hand at different jobs while at the same time still more questions cropped up in his mind.

In 1953, the publishing of the Testament du Haut-Rhône crowned a ten-year poetic quest. The book, noted by Charles-Albert Cingria, was a success (its author got awarded the Prix Rambert), yet, the poet was forced to rethink himself and was thrown into a deep despair. To see the world from a new perspective, he decided to join the Grande Dixence Dam building site, where he worked as a surveyor-attendant. This experience reconciled him with poetry and its outcome was the Chant de la Grande Dixence (written as of 1959, and published in 1965). Later to be followed by Portrait des Valaisans en Légende et en Vérité (1965), Office des Morts (written in 1963, and published in 1966) or Tendres Campagnes(written in 1962, and published in 1966).

Maurice Chappaz carried out still other numerous trips around the world : Lapland (1968), Paris (1968), Nepal and Tibet (1970), Mount Athos (1972), Lebanon (1974), Russia (1974 et 1979), China (1981), Quebec and New York (1990).

In the 1970s, the press and the Valaisian population were divided over the publishing of his book Les Maquereaux des cimes blanches (The Mackerels of the White Ridges), which is a pamphlet against the tourist industry that wreaks havoc in the genuine Valais. On that occasion, students from Saint-Maurice wrote Vive Chappaz (long live Chappaz) in huge white capital letters on the cliff overlooking the abbey.

On Corinna Bille's death, in 1979, he left Veyras, where they had moved in in 1957, and he settled in Le Châble abbey, which belonged to his mother's side. Then he published poems alternating between the burlesque and a deathly tone (A rire et à mourir, 1983), he began a 6000 pages Journal, held continuously from 1981 to 1987, and wrote a tale and poetical prose dealing with mourning (Octobre 79 and Le Livre de C., 1986).

Eager to publish his wife Corinna Bille's unpublished writings, left behind at her death, and taking over the translation from Virgil for éditions Gallimard (1987) and Theocritus' Idylls (1992), he drafted a picture of the Alpine ancient civilization in Valais-Tibet (2000).

In 1997, Maurice Chappaz was awarded Grand Prix Schiller, the most prestigious Swiss award, and that same year, he was also awarded, in France, the Poetry Bourse Goncourt for the whole of his work. In Autumn 2001, Évangile selon Judas (Gospel according to Judas), a theological fictitious tale, was published by Gallimard.

In 2002, he wrote a text titled Lettre d'une forêt à l'autre which was published in the art review Trou (issue n°12); the head edition (100 issues numbered and signed) contained a facsimile of the manuscript of his thank speech for his title of Commandeur des Arts et des Lettres, delivered in Martigny in Autumn 2001 for the French ambassador.

Chappaz's last published book before his death was La Pipe qui prie et fume, in 2008.

Maurice Chappaz died on 15 January 2009 in Martigny hospital. His estate is archived in the Swiss Literary Archives in Bern.

== Prizes and awards ==
- Grand Prix Académie Rhodanienne, 1948
- Prix Eugène Rambert, 1953
- Prix de la Ville de Martigny, 1966
- Prix de l'État du Valais, 1985
- Grand Prix Schiller, 1997
- Bourse Goncourt de la poésie, 1997
- Grand Prix du Salon du livre de Montagne, Passy (France), 2000

== Works ==
- Les Grandes Journées de printemps, Porrentruy, Aux portes de France, 1944, p. 56; rééd. Lausanne, Cahiers de la renaissance vaudoise, 1966, p. 71
- Grand Saint-Bernard, 80 photographies d'Oscar Darbellay, Lausanne, J. Marguerat, 1953, pp. 23, 80
- Testament du Haut-Rhône, Lausanne, Rencontre, 1953, p. 99; rééd. Lausanne, Cahiers de la renaissance vaudoise, 1966, p. 100; rééd. ill. par Gérard de Palézieux, Saint-Clément-de-Rivière, Fata Morgana, 2003
- Le Valais au gosier de grive, Lausanne, Payot, 1960, p. 77
- Chant de la Grande Dixence, Lausanne, Payot, 1965, p. 60
- Un homme qui vivait couché sur un banc, Lausanne, Cahiers de la renaissance vaudoise, 1966, p. 110
- Office des morts, Lausanne, Cahiers de la renaissance vaudoise, 1966, p. 79
- Tendres Campagnes, Lausanne, Cahiers de la renaissance vaudoise, 1966, p. 66
- Verdures de la nuit, Lausanne, Cahiers de la renaissance vaudoise, 1966, p. 53
- Le Match Valais-Judée, [2nd éd.], dessins d'Étienne Delessert, Lausanne, Cahiers de la Renaissance vaudoise, 1969, p. 207
- La Tentation de l'Orient : lettres autour du monde, Lausanne, Cahiers de la Renaissance vaudoise, 1970, p. 150
- Lötschental secret : les photographies historiques d'Albert Nyfeler, ill. d'A. Nyfeler, Lausanne, Éd. 24 heures, 1975, p. 155
- Les Maquereaux des cimes blanches, Vevey, B. Galland, 1976, p. 68
- Portrait des Valaisans : en légende et en vérité, [5th éd.], Vevey, B. Galland, 1976, p. 187
- Adieu à Gustave Roud, avec Philippe Jaccottet et Jacques Chessex, Vevey, B. Galland, 1977, p. 85
- Pages choisies : avec un inédit, préface d'Étiemble, Lausanne-Paris, A. Eibel-Ophrys, 1977, p. 282
- Poésie, préface de Marcel Raymond, Vevey-Paris, B. Galland-Payot, 1980
- À rire et à mourir : récits, paraboles et chansons du lointain pays, Vevey, B. Galland, 1983, p. 241
- Les Maquereaux des cimes blanches, précédé de La Haine du passé, Genève, Éd. Zoé, 1984, p. 99
- Journal des 4000, ill. de Claire Colmet Daâge, Briançon, Passage, 1985, p. 89
- Le Livre de C, [nouv. éd. revue], Lausanne, Éditions Empreintes, 1987, p. 151
- Le Garçon qui croyait au paradis, récit, Lausanne, Éd. 24 heures, 1989, p. 100
- La Veillée des Vikings, récits, Lausanne, Éd. 24 heures, 1990, p. 134
- Le Gagne-pain du songe : correspondance 1928–1961, M. Chappaz et Maurice Troillet, Lausanne, Éd. Empreintes, 1991, p. 283
- Journal de l'année 1984 : écriture et errance, postfaces de Marius Michaud et de Stéphanie Cudré-Mauroux, Lausanne, Éd. Empreintes, 1996, p. 240
- La Tentation de l'Orient : lettres autour du monde, M. Chappaz et Jean-Marc Lovay, préf. de Nicolas Bouvier, post. de Jérôme Meizoz, Genève, Éd. Zoé, 1997, pp. X–141
- Bienheureux les lacs, ill. de Gérard Palézieux, Genève, Slatkine, 1998, p. 108
- Partir à vingt ans, préf. de Jean Starobinski, Genève, La Joie de lire, 1999, p. 216
- Évangile selon Judas, récit, Paris, Gallimard, 2001, p. 167
- Le Voyage en Savoie : du renard à l'eubage, photos et réal. graphique Matthieu Gétaz, Genève, La Joie de lire, 2001, p. 94
- À-Dieu-vat !, entretiens avec Jérôme Meizoz, Sierre, Monographic, 2003, p. 221
- Se reconnaître poète ? : correspondance 1935–1953, M. Chappaz et Gilbert Rossa, éd. par Françoise Fornerod, Genève, Slatkine, 2007, p. 397
- La Pipe qui prie et fume, avec 26 reprod. de monotypes de Pierre-Yves Gabioud, Éd. Conférence, 2008, p. 200

== Bibliography ==
- Christophe Carraud, Maurice Chappaz, suivi d'une Anthologie des grands textes en prose et en vers de Maurice Chappaz, Seghers, coll. " Poètes d'aujourd'hui ", 2005, p. 334
