= Helen D. Zepp =

American medical researcher

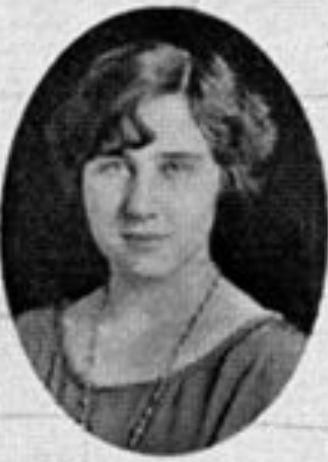
- Helen D. Zepp, from the 1927 yearbook of Goucher College
- Born: June 28, 1903; Maryland, U.S.
- Died: March 18, 1994 (aged 90); New York, U.S.
- Occupations: Medical researcher, bacteriologist

Helen Dorothy Zepp (June 28, 1903 – March 18, 1994) was an American medical researcher based in Baltimore and later in New York City. She did research on viruses and vaccines, including polio and herpes.

== Early life and education ==
Zepp was born in Maryland, the daughter of Dorry R. Zepp and Jane (Jennie) Ethel Cridler Zepp. She graduated from Goucher College in 1926.

== Career ==
Zepp worked at the Philadelphia Hospital for Contagious Diseases after college. She worked at the Harriet Lane Home of Johns Hopkins Hospital, and at Sydenham Hospital in Baltimore, in the 1940s. In 1949, she moved with her collaborator Horace L. Hodes to become assistant to the director of pediatrics at Mount Sinai Hospital in New York City. There, she was part of the team that devised a simple polio immunity test in 1957. "It seems to me that my life is one white mouse after another," she reported to the Goucher alumnae magazine in 1954.

== Publications ==
Zepp was co-author on articles that appeared in JAMA, Science, Nature, The Journal of Pediatrics, and Experimental Biology and Medicine.

- "Salmonella Suipestifer Infections in Man" (1933, with Ann G. Kuttner)
- "Development of antibody following vaccination of infants and children against pneumococci" (1944, with Horace L. Hodes and James F. Ziegler Jr.)
- "New Method for Detection of Human Poliomyelitis Antibodies" (1957, with Horace L. Hodes, Walter L. Henley, and Ruth Berger)
- "A Physical Property as a Virus Marker: Difference in Avidity of Cellulose Resin for Virulent (Mahoney) and Attenuated (LSc, 2ab) Strain of Type 1 Poliovirus" (1960, with Horace L. Hodes and Eugene A. Ainbender)
- "Enhancement of Resistance in Mice to Staphylococcal Infection by Preliminary Treatment with a Staphylococcal Extract" (1961, with Alfred L. Florman, Jeanne L. Scoma, and Eugene Ainbender)
- "The Difference in Elutability of Poliovirus and SV40 from a DEAE Column" (1962, with Eugene Ainbender and Horace L. Hodes)
- "Radioautographic Studies of Poliovirus Binding by Human Immunoglobulins" (1965, with Eugene Ainbender, Ruth Berger, M. Magda Hevizy, and Horace L. Hodes)
- "Study of Viral Antibodies by the Paper-Radioactive Virus Method" (1966, with H. L. Hodes, E. Ainbender, R. Berger, and M. M. Hevizy)
- "An antibiotic against herpes virus" (1966, with H. L. Hodes, I. H. Leopold, and S. Sherman)
- "Production of O and H agglutinins by a newborn infant infected with Salmonella st. paul" (1966, with Horace L. Hodes, Eugene Ainbender, Ruth Berger, M. Magda Hevizy)
- "Demonstration of IgA Polioantibody in Saliva, Duodenal Fluid and Urine" (1967, with Ruth Berger, Eugene Ainbender, Horace L. Hodes, and M. Magda Hevizy)
- "Human-mosquito somatic cell hybrids induced by ultraviolet-inactivated sendai virus" (1971, with J. H. Conover, K. Hirschhorn, and H. L. Hodes)
- "Production of human-mosquito somatic cell hybrids and their response to virus infection" (1971, with James H. Conover, Kurt Hirschhorn, and Horace L. Hodes)
