= Alice Ceresa =

Swiss writer

Alice Ceresa (Basel, 25 January 1923 – Rome, 21 December 2001) was a Swiss writer.

== Biography ==
Alicia Ceresa, who signed her name Alice, came from a Ticinese family. She moved to Zürich and worked as a journalist with the magazines Die Weltwoche and Svizzera italiana. It was there she met Luigi Comencini, Franco Fortini, Ignazio Silone, and other Italian expatriates. She moved to Rome in 1950, where she collaborated with the magazines it:Tempo presente and Botteghe Oscure. She also published work with the literary journal Les Lettres Nouvelles. Ceresa also published translated works, including L’altro processo: le lettere di Kafka a Felice by Elias Canetti, correspondence on the literature of Helmut Heißenbüttel and de:Heinrich Vormweg, the autobiography of the actress Hildegard Knef, L'incredibile storia di Johann il buono and Commedia by Gerold Späth (often through the publishing house Longanesi, who she consulted for).

Her published literary works, although not numerous, were all dedicated to feminist issues and given critical praise. With La figlia prodiga she opened the series for the Einaudi publishing house "La ricerca letteraria" directed by it:Guido Davico Bonino, Giorgio Manganelli and Edoardo Sanguineti, which was awarded the Viareggio Prize in 1967. The book's experimental dynamism connected it to the feminist movement and the literary group Gruppo '63.

Her books were collected in La figlia prodiga e altre storie, while her Piccolo dizionario dell’inuguaglianza femminile was released posthumously and edited by Tatiana Crivelli. Her papers were left to the Swiss National Library where, among unedited manuscripts, there are also originals of her correspondence with authors such as Italo Calvino, Dacia Maraini e Elio Vittorini.

== Works ==
- Gli altri, in "Svizzera italiana", n. 17–20, Lugano, 1943
- La figlia prodiga, Einaudi ("it:La ricerca letteraria" n. 1), Turin, 1967
- La morte del padre, in "Nuovi Argomenti", n. 62, April–May 1979, pp. 69–92
- Bambine, Einaudi ("Nuovi coralli" n. 423), Torino, 1990, finalist for the Bergamo Prize
- La figlia prodiga e altre storie, it:La Tartaruga, Milan, 2004.
- Piccolo dizionario dell'inuguaglianza femminile, afterword by it:Jacqueline Risset, Nottetempo, Rome.
- La morte del padre, with Ritratto di Alice by it:Patrizia Zappa Mulas, et al., 2013.
