= Edmond Bille =

Swiss artist

Edmond Bille (1878 in Valangin – 1959 in Sierre) was a Swiss artist. Bille engaged in intense and varied activity as painter, engraver, stained glass artist, journalist, writer, and politician. He is the creator of the stained glass windows around the altar of the Cathedral of Lausanne, capital of the Swiss canton of Vaud. He studied at the École des beaux-arts de Genève from 1894 to 1895, and the Académie Julian in Paris as well as in Neuchâtel and Florence.

Bille, Hans Widmer and Jakob Herzog created the artist colony in the Bernese Oberland at Brienzwiler. He eventually settle in Sierre. Other stained glass projects can be seen in churches and public buildings in Martigny, Sierre, and other parts of the Valais region of Switzerland. His daughter S. Corinna Bille became a well-known writer.
