= Rüdiger Schaper =

German writer, journalist and theatre critic

Rüdiger Schaper (born 1959) is a German writer, journalist and theatre critic.

== Life ==
Born in Worms, Schaper lives and works mainly in Berlin and has worked at Der Tagesspiegel since 1999. There he is head of the feuilleton department. He previously was the Berlin cultural correspondent of the Süddeutsche Zeitung.

== Works ==
Essays and cultural history play an important role in Schaper's writing. He published biographies of Harald Juhnke, Constantine Simonides, Karl May and Alexander von Humboldt. His book on theatre history lists above all those theatre-makers who have meant a great deal to him as a critic.

- Spektakel: Eine Geschichte des Theaters von Schlingensief bis Aischylos. Siedler Verlag, Munich 2014, ISBN 978-3-8275-0027-4.
- Karl May: Untertan, Hochstapler, Übermensch. Siedler Verlag, Munich 2011, ISBN 978-3-88680-975-2.
- Die Odyssee des Fälschers. Siedler Verlag, Munich 2011, ISBN 978-3-88680-966-0.
- Der Entertainer der Nation. Harald Juhnke. Zwischen Glamour und Gosse. Argon Verlag, 1997, ISBN 3-87024-384-8.
- Berlin um Mitternacht. Argon Verlag, Munich 1998, ISBN 3-87024-470-4.
- Alexander von Humboldt: Der Preuße und die neuen Welten. Siedler Verlag, Munich 2018, ISBN 978-3-8275-0074-8.
- Elefanten. Ein Portrait. Matthes & Seitz, Berlin 2020, ISBN 978-3-75180-201-7.
