= Lou Lepori =

Swiss translator and writer

- Born: Pierre Lepori; 1968 (age 57–58); Lugano, Switzerland
- Occupations: translator and writer
- Writing career
- Language: Italian and French

Lou Lepori, previously Pierre Lepori (born 1968) is a Swiss queer non-binary translator and writer in Italian and French.

== Life ==
Lepori was born in 1968 in Lugano, Switzerland. They studied in the universities of Siena and Bern (PhD). Lepori was editor for the Theaterlexikon der Schweiz, and a journalist in Lausanne for the Swiss Radio and for the literacy yearbook Viceversa Letteratura. They have translated works by French and Italian writers like Claude Ponti, Monique Laederach, Gustave Roud, Sandro Penna and Luigi Pirandello (to Italian or French). They received the Swiss Schiller Prize for Poetry in 2004. They are the founder and editor of the review Hétérographe: revue des homolittératures ou pas (queer literature & critics). Pierre Lepori's novel Sexuality was published simultaneously in three languages: Italian, French and German. The author did their own translation from Italian to French, and the German translator based her version on the two "originals". In addition, there is a trilingual version that switches between all three languages, depending on which character is speaking."Lepori points here to a very interesting connection: that between literary genre and gender as opposing and separate categories to be contaminated and actively connected to each other. The process of creolization, and hybridization affects the identity of the writer, the body of the text as well as its position within the traditional territories of literary genres. Literary polyphony questions and abolishes clear-cut borders across a whole series of metaphorically interlinked areas" (Rainer Guldin, Flusserstudies, 22, December 2016)

== Selected works ==
- Engl.: Wathever The Name, poems, translated by Peter Valente, New York City, Spuyten Duyvil, 2017
- Engl.: Almonst Love, poems, translated by Peter Valente, Toronto, Guernica Editions, 2022.
- Qualunque sia il nome, poems, introduction by Fabio Pusterla, Bellinzona, Casagrande, 2003.
- Vento, introduction by Stefano Raimondi, Faloppio, LietoColle Libri, 2004.
- Grisù, novel, Bellinzona, Casagrande, 2006.
- Alberto Canetta. La traversata del teatro, essay, Bellinzona, Casagrande, 2007.
- Il teatro nella Svizzera italiana. La generazione dei fondatori (1932-1987), essay, Bellinzona, Casagrande, 2008.
- Quel que soit le nom, poems, Lausanne, Editions d'en bas, 2011 (French translation by Mathilde Vischer).
- Sexualité, novel, Lausanne, Editions d'en bas, 2011 (French).
- Sessualità, Bellinzona, Edizioni Casagrande, 2011 (Italian).
- Sexualität, Biel/Bienne, Verlag die Brotsuppe, 2011 (German translation by Jacqueline Aerne).
- Sans peau, novel, Lausanne, Editions d'en bas, 2013 (French).
- Strade bianche, poems, Novara, Interlinea, 2013 (Italian).
- Come cani, novel, Milan, Edizioni Effigie, 2015 (Italian).
- Comme un chien, novel, Lausanne, Editions d'en bas, 2015 (French).
- Nuit américaine, novel, Lausanne, Editions d'en bas, 2018 (French).
- Quasi amore, poems, Bellinzona, Edizioni Sottoscala, 2018 (Italian).
- Klaus Nomi Projekt, theatre, Lausanne, Editions Humus, 2018 (French).
- Effetto notte, novel, Milan, Edizioni Effigie, 2019(Italian).
- Le Théâtre de Luigi Pirandello, essai, Lausanne, Editions Ides & Calendes, 2020 (French).
- Philippe Rahmy, le voyageur de cristal, essay, Geneva, Editions Double-Ligne, 2023.
- Corpi, novel, Milan, Edizioni Effigie, 2024 (Italian).
