= Werner Zemp =

Werner Zemp (1906-1959) was a German-Swiss poet and translator, "regarded in Switzerland as the most distinguished German-Swiss pastoral poet of his generation". Zemp was also an expert on the 19th-century poet Eduard Mörike.

== Works ==
- Gedichte [Poetry], 1937.
- Mörike : Elemente und Anfänge [Mörike: elements and beginnings], 1938
- (tr.) Tanz, Zeichnung und Degas [Dance, drawing and Degas] by Paul Valéry. Zurich, 1940. Translated from the French Degas, danse, dessin.
- (ed.) Briefe [Letters] by Eduard Mörike.
- Das lyrische Werk, Aufsätze, Briefe [The lyrical work, essays, letters], 1967.
