= Beat Sterchi =

Swiss author (born 1949)

Beat Sterchi (born 12 December 1949, Bern) is a Swiss author who writes in Standard German and Bernese.

Sterchi is best known for his 1983 novel Blösch (translated into English as Cow), which won several awards. The novel describes the psychological impact of working in an abattoir.

== Life ==
After secondary school, Beat Sterchi worked as a butcher, his father's profession. In 1970 he emigrated to Canada, where he completed a BA of English at the University of British Columbia, Vancouver. In 1975 he went to Honduras, where he worked as an English teacher in the capital Tegucigalpa until 1977 and published his first poems in English and German. From 1977 to 1982 he studied at McGill University in Montréal and worked as a teacher at the Goethe-Institut. From 1984 to 1994, Sterchi lived as a freelance writer in a Spanish village near Valencia. His current residence is Bern.

The Swiss Literary Archives of the Swiss National Library acquired Sterchi's papers in 2008, with emphasis on his preparations for his novel Blösch.
