= Paul Nizon =

Swiss art historian and writer (born 1929)

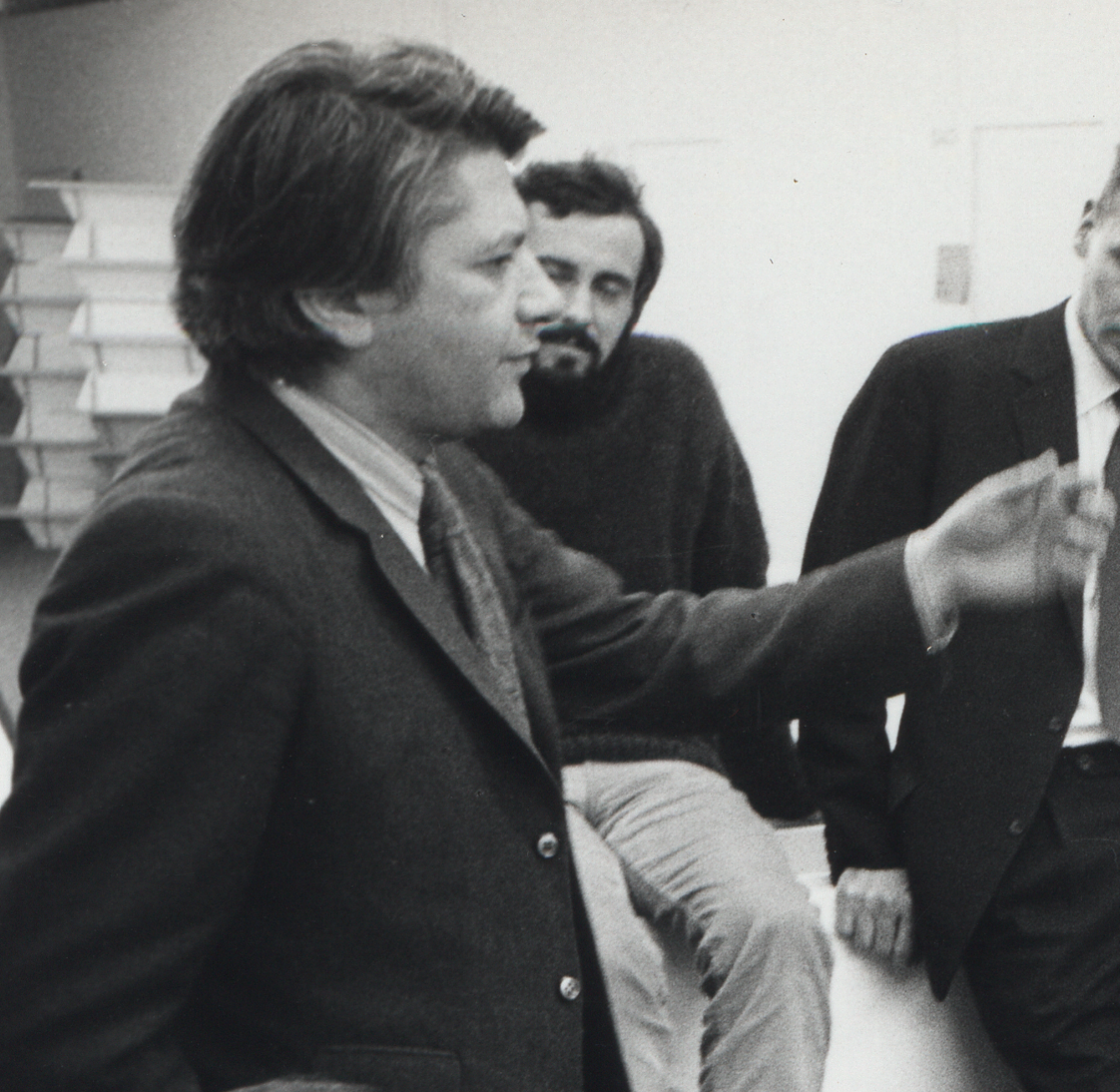
Paul Nizon

Paul Nizon (born 19 December 1929 in Bern) is a Swiss art historian and writer.

== Biography ==
The son of a Jewish chemist from Vitebsk and a Swiss mother, after leaving school he studied history of art, classical archaeology and German language and literature in the universities of Bern and Munich. He obtained his doctorate in 1957 with a thesis on Vincent van Gogh. He worked as an assistant at the Historisches Museum in Bern until 1959. In 1960, he was awarded a scholarship at the Swiss Institute in Rome. In 1961, he was a leading art critic of the Neue Zürcher Zeitung. Since 1962 Nizon, who has lived in Paris since 1977, has been a freelance writer. He has held various guest lectureships, including in 1984 in the University of Frankfurt am Main and 1987 in Washington University in St. Louis. Nizon's estate is archived in the Swiss Literary Archives in Bern.

== Selected bibliography ==
- Die gleitenden Plätze (1959)
- Canto (Suhrkamp, 1963)
- Diskurs in der Enge (1970)
- Im Hause enden die Geschichten (Suhrkamp, 1971)
- Untertauchen. Protokoll einer Reise (Suhrkamp, 1972)
- Stolz (Suhrkamp, 1975)
- Das Jahr der Liebe (Suhrkamp, 1981). My Year of Love, trans. Jean M. Snook (Dalkey Archive, 2013)
- Im Bauch des Wals (Suhrkamp, 1989)
- Hund (Suhrkamp, 1998)
- Abschied von Europa (Suhrkamp, 2003)
- Das Fell der Forelle (Suhrkamp, 2005)

=== Journals ===
- Die Innenseite des Mantels. Journal 1980–1989 (Suhrkamp, 1995)
- Die Erstausgaben der Gefühle. Journal 1961–1972 (Suhrkamp, 2002)
- Das Drehbuch der Liebe. Journal 1973–1979 (Suhrkamp, 2004)
- Die Zettel des Kuriers. Journal 1990–1999 (Suhrkamp, 2008)
- Urkundenfälschung. Journal 2000–2010 (Suhrkamp, 2012)
- Der Nagel im Kopf. Journal 2011–2020 (Suhrkamp, 2021)

== Awards and honors ==
- Gert-Jonke-Preis 2017
- Schweizer Grand Prix Literatur 2014
- Literaturpreis des Kantons Bern 2012
- Austrian State Prize for European Literature 2010
- Kranichsteiner Literaturpreis 2007
- Buchpreis des Kantons Bern 2006
- Buchpreis der Stadt Bern für Das Fell der Forelle 2005
- Erich Fried Prize, Vienna 1996
- Großer Literaturpreis des Kantons Bern 1994
- Literaturpreis der Stadt Bern 1994
- Stadtschreiber von Bergen 1993
- Literaturpreis der Stadt Zürich 1992
- Marie-Luise-Kaschnitz-Preis 1990
- Torcello-Preis der Peter Suhrkamp Stiftung 1989
- France Culture Channel Award for Foreign Literature 1988
- Chevalier Ordre des Arts et des Lettres 1988
- Literaturpreis der Stadt Bern 1984
- Deutscher Kritikerpreis für Literatur 1982
- Preis der Schweizerischen Schillerstiftung 1982
- Literaturpreis der Freien Hansestadt Bremen 1975
- Conrad Ferdinand Meyer Preis 1972

== See also ==
- Jean-Louis de Rambures, whose translations introduced Nizon to a French readership
