= S. Corinna Bille =

Stéphanie Corinna Bille (29 August 1912 – 24 October 1979) was a French-speaking writer from Switzerland.

Bille was born in Lausanne, the daughter of Swiss painter Edmond Bille, and grew up in Sierre. She was a script editor on the 1933 Dimitri Kirsanoff-directed film Rapt, which was shot on location in Switzerland. During the production she met the film's star Geymond Vital, after which she moved to Paris to be with Vital and they got married. The marriage was later annulled. In 1937, she returned to Switzerland, where she fell gravely ill. After her recovery, Bille married the writer Maurice Chappaz.

In 1974, she received the Prix Schiller for her work. She won the 1975 Prix Goncourt de la Nouvelle for La Demoiselle sauvage.

Several short stories and novels by Bille were translated into German and Italian and a few short stories were translated into English. In 2006, a collection of English translations of short stories and longer prose was published as The Transparent Girl and Other Stories.

Although Bille travelled extensively, she always returned home to Valais. She died in Sierre. Her estate is archived in the Swiss Literary Archives in Bern.

== Selected works ==
- Printemps (Spring), poetry (1939)
- Théoda, novel (1944)
- Le grand tourment (The great anguish), novellas (1951)
- Le sabot de Vénus (Venus' wooden shoes), novel (1952)
- Florilège alpestre (Alpine album), essay (1953)
- L'enfant aveugle (The blind child), stories (1955)
- Jeunesse d'un peintre (Youth of a painter) (1962), by Edmond Bille, as editor
- Le pays secret (The secret country), poetry (1963)
- Le mystère du monstre (Mystery of the monster), children's stories (1966)
