= Adolf Muschg =

Swiss writer and professor of literature

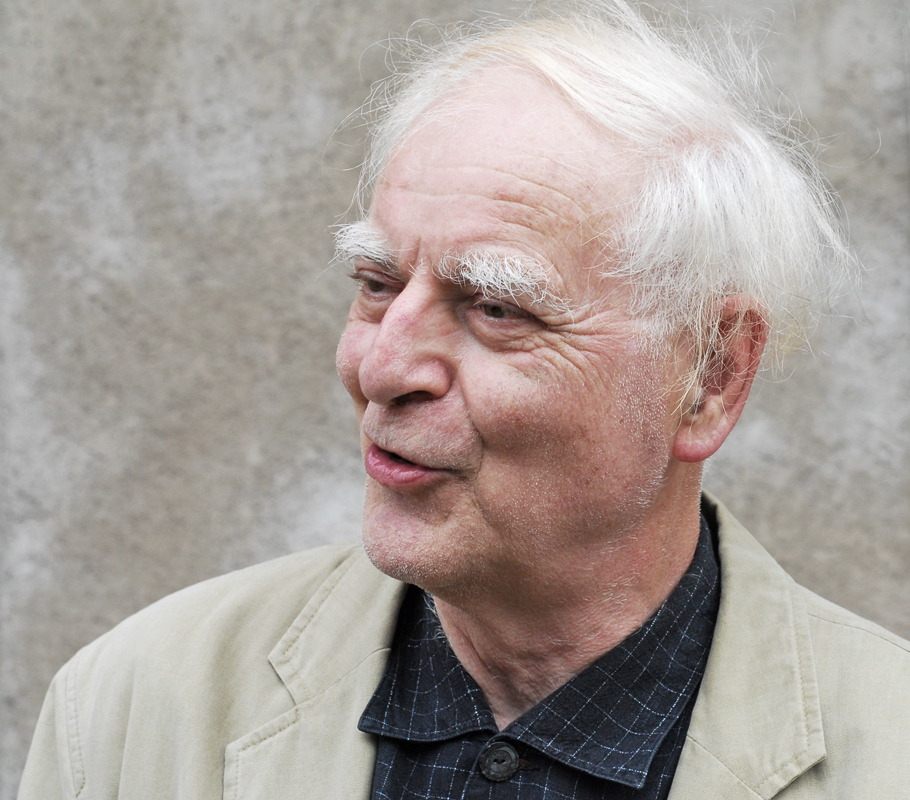
- Born: 13 May 1934 (age 92); Zollikon, Switzerland
- Occupations: Writer, professor

Adolf Muschg (born 13 May 1934) is a Swiss writer and professor of literature. Muschg was a member of the Gruppe Olten.

== Biography ==
Adolf Muschg was born in Zollikon, canton of Zürich, Switzerland. He studied German studies, English studies and philosophy at the universities of Zürich and Cambridge and earned his doctoral degree with a work about Ernst Barlach.

Between 1959 and 1962, he worked as a teacher in Zürich. Different engagements as a teacher followed in (Göttingen), Japan and the US. From 1970 to 1999 Muschg was professor of German language and literature at the Eidgenössische Technische Hochschule, Zürich.

He wrote the foreword to Fritz Zorn's controversial memoirs Mars. The book pointed out the supposedly "cancer-causing" lifestyle of Zurich's wealthy gold coast and provoked a scandal in Switzerland; its author died of cancer before its release. Muschg was also provocative with works like Wenn Auschwitz in der Schweiz liegt ("If Auschwitz were in Switzerland"). One of his most famous works is the 1993 novel Der Rote Ritter, which is a playful retelling of the medieval romance Parzival over more than 1000 pages, and frequently described as postmodernist. His detractors suggest that Muschg was writing without direct experience. A theme of his newer works is often love in old age.

Since 1976 he has been a member of the Academy of Arts, Berlin; he is also a member of the Akademie der Wissenschaften und der Literatur, Mainz and the Deutsche Akademie für Sprache und Dichtung, Darmstadt. In 2003 he was elected president of the Berlin Academy but left the presidency in December 2005 because of disagreements with the academy's senate about public relations.

Muschg lives in Männedorf near Zürich. His estate is archived in the Swiss Literary Archives in Bern.

== Awards ==
- 1968 Conrad Ferdinand Meyer Prize
- 1974 Hermann-Hesse-Literaturpreis
- 1984 Zürich Literature Prize
- 1990 Carl Zuckmayer Medal
- 1993 Ricarda-Huch-Preis
- 1994 Georg Büchner Prize
- 1995 Vilenica International Literary Prize
- 2001 Grimmelshausen-Preis
- 2017 Prize of the Internationale Hermann-Hesse-Gesellschaft
- 2025 European Prize for Political Culture

== Works ==
- Im Sommer des Hasen, 1965
- Gegenzauber, 1967
- Fremdkörper, 1968
- Rumpelstilz. Ein kleinbürgerliches Trauerspiel, 1968
- Mitgespielt, 1969
- Papierwände, 1970
- Die Aufgeregten von Goethe. Ein politisches Drama, 1971
- Liebesgeschichten, 1972
- Albissers Grund, crime novel, 1974
- Entfernte Bekannte, 1976
- Kellers Abend. Ein Stück aus dem 19. Jahrhundert, 1976
- Noch ein Wunsch, 1979
- Baiyun oder die Freundschaftsgesellschaft, 1980
- Leib und Leben, 1982
- Das Licht und der Schlüssel. Erziehungsroman eines Vampirs, novel, 1984
- Goethe als Emigrant, 1986
- Der Turmhahn und andere Lebensgeschichten, 1987
- Der Rote Ritter. Eine Geschichte von Parzival, 1993
- Herr, was fehlt euch? Zusprüche und Nachreden aus dem Sprechzimmer eines heiligen Grals, 1994
- Nur ausziehen wollte sie sich nicht, 1995
- Die Insel, die Kolumbus nicht gefunden hat. Sieben Gesichter Japans, 1995
- O mein Heimatland!, 1998
- Sutters Glück, 2001
- Das gefangene Lächeln. Eine Erzählung, 2002
- Gehen kann ich allein und andere Liebesgeschichten, 2003
- Der Schein trügt nicht. Ueber Goethe, 2004
- Eikan, du bist spät, 2005

=== Other works ===
- Gottfried Keller, biography, 1977
- Wenn Auschwitz in der Schweiz liegt, 1997

== Voice recordings ==
- Baiyun oder die Freundschaftsgesellschaft; Läufer und Brücken – eine unveröffentlichte Erzählung. Ausschnitte aus der Lesung in Hoser's Buchhandlung am 4. Oktober 1979 (Hoser's Buchhandlung, Stuttgart, ohne Nummer) (1 LP) ISBN 3-921414-05-9

== Literature ==
- Judith Ricker-Abderhalden (ed.): Über Adolf Muschg. Suhrkamp, Frankfurt am Main 1979, ISBN 3-518-10686-4.
- Renate Voris: Adolf Muschg. C.H. Beck, Munich 1984. ISBN 3-406-30165-7.
- Manfred Dierks (ed.): Adolf Muschg. Suhrkamp, Frankfurt 1989, ISBN 3-518-38586-0.
- Andreas Dorschel: 'Tüchtig nach Hause geleuchtet', in Süddeutsche Zeitung, nr 103 (5 May 2004), p. 16.
- Rüdiger Schaper: 'Wer im Glashaus schwitzt. Akademie-Präsident Adolf Muschg gibt auf', in: Der Tagesspiegel, nr 19047 (16 December 2005), p. 25.
- (in French) Alexandre Mirlesse: En attendant l'Europe (Rencontre avec Adolf Muschg). La Contre Allée, Lille 2009, ISBN 978-2-917817-01-8.
