= Gerold Späth =

Swiss author, poet and writer (1939–2026)

- Born: 16 October 1939; Rapperswil, St. Gallen, Switzerland
- Died: 14 October 2026 (aged 86)
- Occupations: Author, poet and writer
- Years active: 1970–2026
- Known for: Commedia (1980)
- Style: Adult literature
- Spouse: Christine Lötscher
- Awards: Gerold Späth#Awards

Gerold Späth (16 October 1939 – 14 October 2026) was a Swiss author, poet and writer.

== Life and career ==
Gerold Späth was born in Rapperswil, on the Obersee lakeshore in the canton of St. Gallen in Switzerland, on 16 October 1939, the son of an organ builder. He studied in London and Fribourg, after a training as an export clerk. Later, he worked in his father's company Späth Orgelbau in Rapperswil. Thereafter, Gerold Späth undertook several trips and a longer stay in Ireland. Späth lived and wrote mainly in Rapperswil.

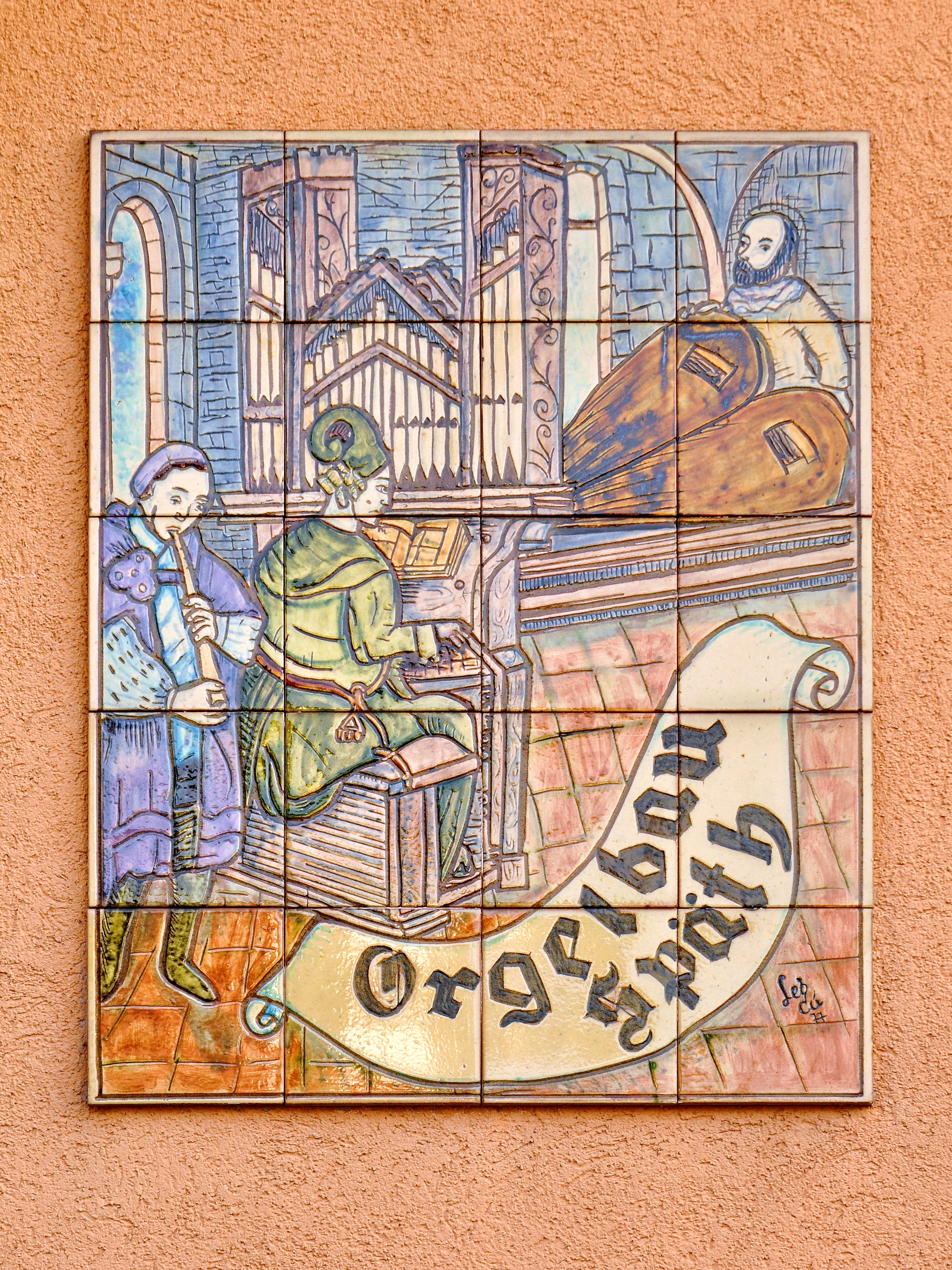
Späth Orgelbau, Giessi in Rapperswil

Späth's three central works are thematically connected: "Unschlecht" (1970), "Balzapf oder als ich auftauchte" (1977) and "Barbarswila" (1988), in which Rapperswil gave model to the fictitious localities Spiessbünzen, Molchgüllen and Barbarswila, the satirical depictions of a typical Swiss small-town. A new narrative form was introduced with Commedia (1980), in a certain way basing on Dante's Inferno, for which Späth was awarded with the German book prize Alfred-Döblin-Preis. Späth's literally cosmos is characterized by love, lust and vices, and a propensity to the blazing sensuality and baroque awareness of the transience of everything earthly. He dominates all the stops by the comical and humorous to the tragic. Tales of Späth's home town of Rapperswil and the region around Zürichsee form a central motif of his work.

The Swiss films Der Landvogt von Greifensee (1979) and Völlerei oder Inselfest (1980) are based on Gerold Späth's novels.

His novels and short stories were translated in various languages, inter alia by Alice Ceresa the Italian-language edition of the novel "Unschlecht" (Italian: L'incredibile storia di Johann il Buono) in 1977.

Späth's self-image as author is palpable to his organ builder family, as he told on occasion of a dramatic reading: "it's important that an organ will still be in 200 years a good organ". This results in care for writing, which he called "team inability". He wants no lecturer, independence in writing is crucial. Also of importance to his literary works are the different residences – Rapperswil, Ireland and Italy – life abroad is deteriorating views of Switzerland. Anyway, Switzerland and his childhood in Rapperswil, which Gerold Späth compares with Mark Twain's Tom Sawyer and Huckleberry Finn, as he grew up with the so-called Seebuebedütsch (Zürichsee children language, meaning also 'wild') and to write on the people's mouth. His 'staff' is reduced to four family members, among them his wife Christine Lötscher.

Späth died on 14 October 2026, aged 86.

== Work ==
=== Books (excerpt) ===
- 1979: Unschlecht. Arche, Zürich 1970, ASIN B002PDE5W4.
- 1979: Commedia. Fischer, Berlin 1980, ISBN 978-3100774026.
- 1991: Stilles Gelände am See. Suhrkamp, Berlin 1991, ISBN 978-3518403730.
- 2013: Drei Vögel im Rosenbusch. Eine Erzählung. Lenos, Basel 2013, ASIN B00J7KDOM0.

== Poems (excerpt) ==
- 2005: Hebed Sorg. In: Ufnau – Insel der Stille, Rapperswil 2005.

== Filmography ==
- 1980: Völlerei oder Inselfest (Todsünde 4)
- 1979: The Bailiff of Greifensee (Der Landvogt von Greifensee)

== Awards ==
- 1970: Award of Conrad Ferdinand Meyer-Stiftung
- 1970: Werkjahr der Stadt Zürich
- 1972: Werkjahr Pro Helvetia (as well in 1991 and 1997)
- 1973: Werkjahr Stiftung Schweizerische Landesausstellung
- 1975: Werkjahr Kanton Zürich
- 1977: Anerkennungsgabe der Stadt Zürich (and in 1984)
- 1979: Anerkennungsgabe Kanton St. Gallen
- 1979: Alfred-Döblin-Preis for Commedia
- 1980: DAAD-Stipendiat in Berlin
- 1980/1981: Istituto Svizzero Roma scholarship
- 1983: Award of Schweizerische Schillerstiftung (and in 1992)
- 1983: Premio stampa internazionale della città di Roma
- 1984: Georg Mackensen-Literaturpreis
- 1987: Hörspielpreis Stiftung "Radio Basel"
- 1990: Preis für Schweizer Theatermacher
- 2001: Ehrengabe der Stadt Zürich
- 2004: Werkbeitrag Pro Helvetia

== Literature ==
- Charlotte E. Aske: Gerold Späth und die Rapperswiler Texte. Untersuchungen zu Intertextualität und kultureller Identität. Lang, Bern 2002, ISBN 3-906767-45-0.
- Klaus Isele, Franz Loquai (Hrsg.): Gerold Späth. Edition Isele, Eggingen 1993, ISBN 3-925016-98-8.
