= Silvio Blatter =

Swiss writer

Silvio Blatter (born 25 January 1946 in Bremgarten, canton Aargau) is a Swiss writer.

== Life ==
Silvio Blatter was born into a working-class family. He attended school at the "Bezirksschule"-level in his hometown. From 1962 to 1966, he attended the teacher's seminar in Wettingen, canton Aargau. He worked as a primary school teacher for six years in Aarau, the capital of canton Aargau. In 1970, he worked in a metalworking company.

In 1972, Blatter began his college education at the University of Zurich in literature and language studies, matriculating after six semesters. In 1974, he was employed as a machinist in the plastics industry. The following year, he completed training for directors of audio plays at the Swiss Broadcast (Schweizer Radio DRS, part of SRG SSR idée suisse).

After long stays in Amsterdam and Husum, Blatter finally settled in Zürich as a freelance writer. Currently, he resides in Oberglatt (canton Zurich).

== Work ==
Silvio Blatter mostly writes prose. In his early works, he described every-day life and the monotony of industrial work in a very haunting and detailed manner. The author became known due to his Freiamt-Trilogie ("Freiamt trilogy") comprising the following novels that were published in Blatter's home region that is called "Freiamt" (a certain part of Aargau):

- Zunehmendes Heimweh (literally: "Increasing homesickness")
- Kein schöner Land (literally: "No country more beautiful". Note: The German title stems from an old fixed phrase that uses Land with a male article, although the neuter article would be the correct use today.)
- Das sanfte Gesetz (literally: "The soft law").

These thick books paint a wide picture of the Freiamt region and its inhabitants. They are realistic family novels. In "Das sanfte Gesetz" for example, Blatter portrays four generations of the fictional family Wolf, a family of entrepreneurs. They suffer tragedy. After a car crash, one family member needs leg amputation, another family member is shot by the police and the son loves his young stepmother, who gets pregnant and the reader does not know by whom. In another volume of the trilogy, a little boy observes hand grenades stolen from a small Swiss army depot at a drill ground/shooting range.

Blatter's narrative style is very realistic and modern. He mentions the boy playing Nintendo Game & Watch hand-held games and names of pop songs and singers (Herbert Grönemeyer, Level 42 and others). Even He-Man from Masters of the Universe plays a role. The child discusses religion with a nun and compares He-Man with Jesus, coming to the conclusion that Jesus, who was a "transformer," would not have a chance against his enemies, when he – after the Christian belief - becomes man in Judgment Day. Man's body was weak because it was of flesh, so Jesus shall stay a roadside granite sculpture.

Despite the realistic style, some of Blatter's books contain a slight trace of everyday magic that Blatter seemingly does not want destroy. In "Das sanfte Gesetz," there is a totemist thinking of Nina, the mysterious nun and the great-grandfather talking to his donkeys, sending light beams into space. Blatter himself sometimes seems to describe life in esoteric terms.

During the 1990s, Blatter stopped writing, as he had taken up painting. Since 2000, writing and painting again have the same importance for him.

== Memberships ==
Silvio Blatter is a member of the Swiss-German PEN Centre (from 1984 to 1986 he was its chairman) and of the club "Autorinnen und Autoren der Schweiz".

== Awards and tributes ==
- 1972 Assisting price of Zürich city
- 1974 Conrad-Ferdinand-Meyer-Preis
- 1978 Assisting price of Zürich city
- 1979 Price of the “Neue Literarische Gesellschaft”

== Books ==
The literal English translations of the book titles are given in brackets

- Brände kommen unerwartet, Zürich 1968 (Burnings come unexpected)
- Eine Wohnung im Erdgeschoß, Aarau 1970 (A flat on ground floor)
- Schaltfehler, Zürich 1972 (Switching Error(s))
- Mary Long, Zürich 1973
- Nur der König trägt Bart, Zürich 1973 (Only the King wears a beard)
- Flucht und Tod des Daniel Zoff, Aarau 1974 (Escape and death of Daniel Zoff)
- Genormte Tage, verschüttete Zeit, Frankfurt am Main 1976 (Normed days, buried time)
- Zunehmendes Heimweh, Frankfurt am Main u.a. 1978 (Increasing homesickness)
- Love me tender, Frankfurt am Main 1980
- Die Schneefalle, Zürich u.a. 1981 (The snow trap)
- Kein schöner Land, Frankfurt am Main 1983 (No beautiful country)
- Die leisen Wellen, Zürich 1985, together with Ulrich Anderegg (The silent waves)
- Wassermann, Frankfurt am Main 1986 (Aquarius)
- Das sanfte Gesetz, Frankfurt am Main 1988 (The soft law)
- Das blaue Haus, Frankfurt am Main 1990 (The blue house)
- Avenue America, Frankfurt am Main u.a. 1992
- Der blinde Fleck, Zürich 1992 (The blind spot)
- Die Glückszahl, Frankfurt am Main 2001 (The lucky number)
- Zwölf Sekunden Stille, Frankfurt am Main 2004 (Twelve seconds of silence)
