= Philippe Jaccottet =

Swiss poet (1925–2021)

- Philippe Jaccottet
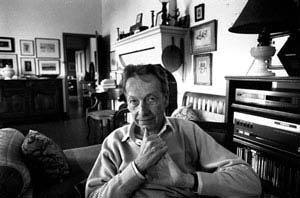
- Jaccottet in 1991
- Born: 30 June 1925; Moudon, Switzerland
- Died: 24 February 2021 (aged 95); Grignan, France
- Writing career
- Language: French

Philippe Jaccottet (French: [filip ʒakotɛ]; 30 June 1925 – 24 February 2021) was a Swiss-born Francophone poet and translator.

== Life and work ==
After completing his studies in Lausanne, he lived for several years in Paris. In 1953, he moved to the town of Grignan in Provence. He translated numerous authors and poets into French, including Goethe, Hölderlin, Mann, Mandelstam, Góngora, Leopardi, Musil, Rilke, Homer and Ungaretti. He was awarded the German international Petrarca-Preis in 1988 for his poetry. In addition to poetry and the novel L'Obscurité (Gallimard, 1961), he is known for his prose writings on music and art, and the notebooks that he published regularly beginning in 1963 under the title La Semaison (seedtime, referring to the seasonal dispersion of seeds).

In 2014, Philippe Jaccottet became the fifteenth living author to be published in the prestigious Bibliothèque de la Pléiade. After Jean-Jacques Rousseau, Blaise Cendrars and Charles-Ferdinand Ramuz, he was the fourth Swiss author to be published in the Bibliothèque de la Pléiade.

He was married in 1953 to the Franco-Swiss painter and illustrator Anne-Marie Jaccottet (b. 26 July 1931, née Haesler). Reproductions of her watercolors and sketches appeared in the volume of his poetry translated into English by Cid Corman in Breathings (Mushinsha Imprint for Grossman Publishers, 1974).

Jaccottet worked with other artists to create limited edition volumes of his work, including Pierre Tal-Cot in À travers un verger (Montpellier: Fata Morgana, 1975) and Zao Wou-Ki in Beauregard (Paris: Maeght, 1981).

His poetry has been characterized as one of "nuance and attenuation" and as moving between "a feeling for the leverage of precise limits and at the same time a yearning, nostalgia, for the illimitably open." The Irish poet Derek Mahon, who translated a selected edition of Jaccottet's poetry from 1953 to 1983, described in his introduction the "intensely visual" quality of the work, and compared it to that of writers as diverse as John Keats, Rilke, Paul Éluard, Samuel Beckett, and W. S. Merwin (who also translated Jaccottet). Translators and critics also note its resemblance to the work of Francis Ponge and its phenomenological discipline.

Jaccottet died in Grignan, France, in February 2021 at the age of 95.

== Honours ==
- 1958 Prix des écrivains vaudois
- 1966 Johann-Heinrich-Voß-Preis für Übersetzung
- 1981 Prix Gottfried Keller
- 1985 Grand Prix de Poésie de la Ville de Paris
- 1988 Petrarca-Preis
- 1995 Grand Prix national de Poésie
- 2003 Prix Goncourt de la poésie
- 2018 Prix mondial Cino Del Duca

== Publications ==
- L'Effraie, 1953
- L'Entretien des muses, 1968
- Paysages avec figures absentes, 1970
- Chant d'En-bas, 1974
- Rilke par lui-même, 1971
- À la lumière d'hiver, 1974
- Des Histoires de passage, 1983
- Pensées sous les nuages, 1983
- La Semaison, Carnets 1954–1967, 1984
- Une Transaction secrète, 1987
- Cahier de verdure, 1990 (poem Cherry Tree, Eng. trans. Mark Treharne)
- Requiem, 1991
- Libretto, La Dogana, 1990
- Poésie, 1946–1967, Poésie/Gallimard, Paris, (1971) 1990
- Requiem (1946); suivi de, Remarques (1990), Fata Morgana, 1991
- Cristal et fumée, Fata Morgana, 1993
- A la lumière d'hiver; précédé de, Leçons; et de, Chants d'en bas; et suivi de, Pensées sous les nuages, Gallimard, 1994 (poem Learning, trans. Mark Treharne, Delos Press, 2001)
- Après beaucoup d'années, Gallimard, 1994
- Autriche, Éditions L'Age d'homme, 1994
- Eaux prodigues, Nasser Assar, lithographies, La Sétérée, J. Clerc, 1994
- Ecrits pour papier journal : chroniques 1951–1970, texts gathered and présented by Jean Pierre Vidal, Gallimard, 1994
- Tout n'est pas dit : billets pour la Béroche : 1956–1964, Le Temps qu'il fait, 1994
- La seconde semaison : carnets 1980-1994, Gallimard, 1996
- Beauregard, postf. d'Adrien Pasquali, Éditions Zoé, 1997
- Paysages avec figures absentes, Gallimard, Paris, (1976) 1997, "coll. poésie/gallimard".
- Observations et autres notes anciennes : 1947–1962, Gallimard, 1998
- A travers un verger; suivi de, Les cormorans; et de, Beauregard, Gallimard, 2000
- Carnets 1995–1998 : la semaison III, Gallimard, 2001
- Notes du ravin, Fata Morgana, 2001
- Et, néanmoins : proses et poésies, Gallimard, 2001
- Le bol du pèlerin (Morandi), La Dogana, 2001.
- Une Constellation, tout près, La Dogana, 2002.
- A partir du mot Russie, Fata Morgana, 2002
- Gustave Roud, présentation et choix de textes par Philippe Jaccottet, Seghers, 2002
- Correspondance, 1942–1976 / Philippe Jaccottet, Gustave Roud; éd. établie, annotée et présentée par José-Flore Tappy, Gallimard, 2002
- Nuages, Philippe Jaccottet, Alexandre Hollan, Fata Morgana, 2002
- Cahier de verdure; suivi de, Après beaucoup d'années, Gallimard, "coll. poésie/gallimard", 2003
- Truinas, le 21 avril 2001, Genève, La Dogana, 2004
- De la poésie, entretien avec Reynald André Chalard, Arléa, 2005

== See also ==
- Swiss literature
- List of Swiss poets

== Bibliography ==
- Alentour de Philippe Jaccottet, Sud no. 80–81, Marseille, 1989.
- "Philippe Jaccottet en filigrane", Revue des sciences humaines, n° 255, Lille, Université Charles-de-Gaulle-Lille III, 1999.
- Marie-Claire DUMAS, La Poésie de Philippe Jaccottet, Paris, Campion, 1986.
- Harvé FERRAGE, Philippe Jaccotet, le pari de l'inactuel, Paris, PUF, 2000.
- Jean-Pierre GIUSTO, Philippe Jaccottet ou le Désir d'inscription, Lille, Presses universitaires de Lille, 1994.
- Yasuaki KAWANABE, Philippe Jaccottet et la Poésie du haiku—"on", L'Un et l'autre, fugures du poème, Revue des Lettres modernes, Paris-Caen, Minard, 2001.
- Jean-Pierre RIHARD, Onze études sur la Poésie moderne, Paris, Seuil, 1964.
- Jean-Pierre VIDAL, Philippe Jaccottet, Paris, Payot, 1990.
