= Adrienne von Speyr =

Swiss doctor and mystic

Servant of God Adrienne von Speyr
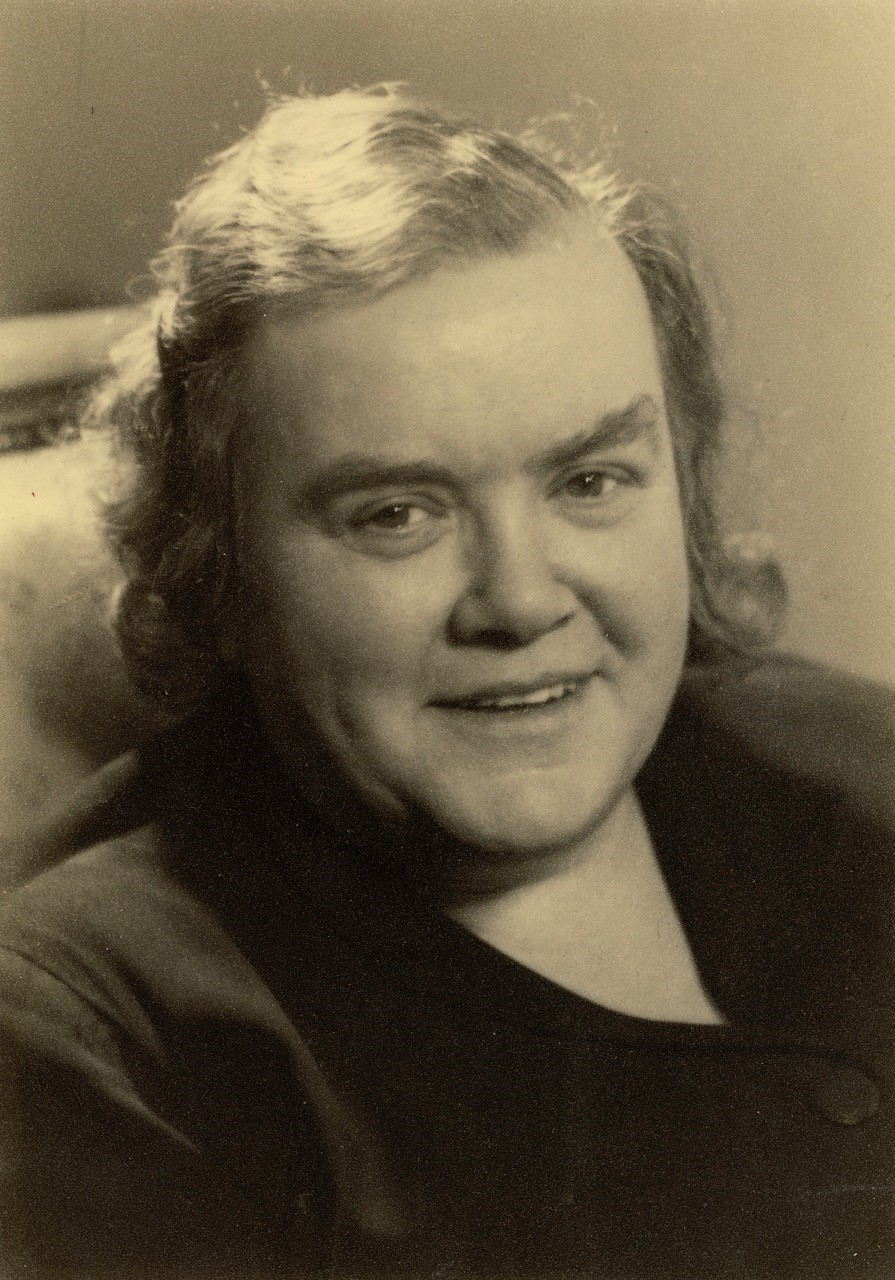
- Born: 20 September 1902; La Chaux-de-Fonds, Neuchâtel, Switzerland
- Died: 17 September 1967 (aged 64); Basel, Switzerland
- Influences: Romano Guardini; Hugo Rahner; Erich Przywara; Reinhold Schneider; Annette Kolb; Gabriel Marcel; Hans Urs von Balthasar; Ignatius of Loyola/Iñigo López de Oñaz y Loyola

Adrienne von Speyr (20 September 1902 – 17 September 1967) was a Swiss Catholic convert, physician, mystic, and author of some sixty books of spirituality and theology.

== Biography ==
=== Early life ===
Adrienne von Speyr was born in La Chaux-de-Fonds, Switzerland, to an upper-middle-class Protestant family. Her father, Theodor von Speyr, was an ophthalmologist. Her mother, Laure Girard, was the descendant of a family of noted watchmakers and jewelers from Geneva and Neuchâtel. Adrienne was her parents' second child. Her sister, Hélène, was a year and a half older. Her first brother, Willy, who became a physician, was born in 1905 and died in 1978. Her second brother, Theodor, was born in 1913 and served as the director of the Swiss Bank Corporation in London for many years.

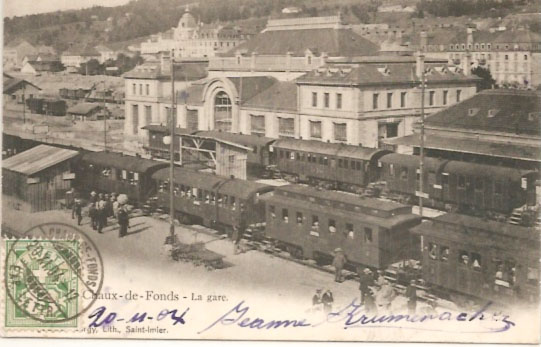
La Chaux-de-Fonds, 1904

By Hans Urs von Balthasar's account, von Speyr was the "unloved child" in her family, despite her cheerfulness. Her mother scolded her daily, often without reason, which led Adrienne to turn to prayer and to develop an appreciation for sacrifice and renunciation. She was close to her father, who understood and respected her, sometimes taking her with him to the hospital to visit sick children. This sparked her desire to become a physician, which would eventually guide her toward a career as a family doctor. In her primary school years, she began knitting for the poor, forming a society with her friends for this purpose. From early on, she had a deep relationship with her grandmother, a prayerful Calvinist.

Von Speyr was a precocious student. As a child, she even occasionally substituted for a teacher who suffered from asthma. In her religion classes, however, she began to sense an emptiness in the form of Protestantism being offered. Although she had no exposure to the Roman Catholic Church, she had some early intuitions about Catholic practice. At the age of nine, she gave a talk to her classmates about the Jesuits, after an angel had told her "that the Jesuits were people who loved Jesus totally, and that the truth of God was greater than that of men, and as a result one could not always tell people everything exactly as one understands it in God". After her conversion to Catholicism in 1940, at thirty-eight years old, she recounted to her confessor Hans Urs von Balthasar that as a young child she encountered in a stairwell a man she only now recognized to be Saint Ignatius of Loyola. During her teenage years, she once reproached a religion teacher for his "prejudice" against Catholicism.

=== Education and teenage years ===
For secondary school, von Speyr attended a coeducational gymnasium, where she excelled, particularly in Latin and Greek. At her mother's insistence, she also spent a year at a girls' school in La Chaux-de-Fonds, since the gymnasium was thought to give her too much exposure to boys. Here, she met fellow student Madeleine Gallet, who became a close companion and helped her mold her sense of Christian discipleship. After a year, von Speyr's father allowed her to return to the gymnasium, where her classmates greeted her with wild applause when she entered. She was popular for her sense of humor and strong ethical judgment.

In November 1917, at age fifteen, she experienced a vision of the Blessed Virgin Mary. "I had never seen anything so beautiful", she later remarked, noting that this image of Mary gave her a "place of refuge" in the years that followed.

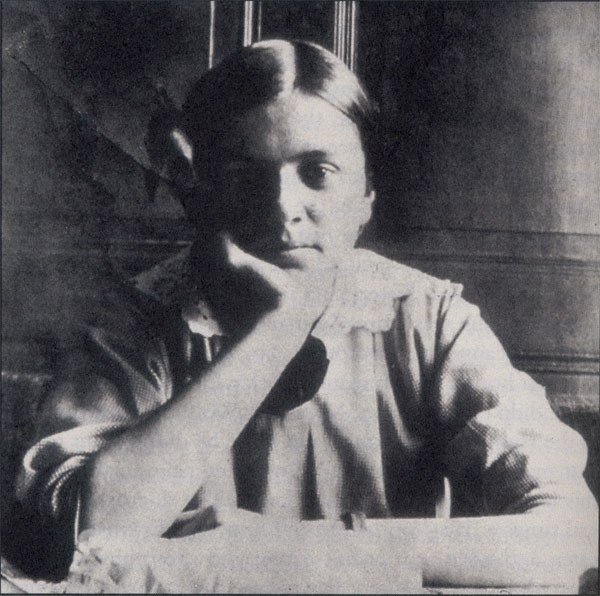
Adrienne von Speyr during secondary school

Adrienne was often sick, with spondylitis that frequently kept her bedridden. According to von Balthasar, she always became ill before Easter and sensed that this was connected with Good Friday. She came to understand her physical suffering as a way of sharing in the pain of others, and she spent much time with the patients at her uncle's psychiatric hospital near Bern, where she discovered a gift for consoling the sick. Theodor von Speyr, Adrienne's father, died of gastrointestinal perforation in January 1918, when she was fifteen. After his death, Adrienne studied at a business school at her mother's request, in addition to her work at the gymnasium. Just a few months later, she contracted tuberculosis, and doctors believed she would die within a year. She was sent to a sanatorium at Leysin, where she was cared for by her cousin, a physician. Her mother rarely wrote or visited. At the sanatorium, von Speyr learned Russian, read Fyodor Dostoyevsky, and was invited to give lectures to fellow patients. One of these talks reportedly prompted her friend Louisa Jacques (later the Poor Clare Sister Mary of the Holy Trinity) to remark, "You're going to make me become a Catholic". At Leysin, Adrienne, too, began to feel drawn to the Roman Catholic Church.

After recovering from a second bout of tuberculosis, von Speyr studied nursing for several months at Hôpital Saint-Loup near Pompaples, but left dissatisfied. She eventually moved with her family to Basel in summer 1921 to finish her secondary studies. Although her mother tried to arrange a job and a husband for her, Adrienne resolved instead to enter medical school at the University of Basel, which created a rift between them. She studied in the Faculty of Medicine between 1923 and 1926, working as a tutor to pay her tuition. She was a pupil of Gerhard Hotz and became a friend of fellow medical students Adolf Portmann, a zoologist, and Franz Merke, a surgeon. She was inspired by the dedication of several doctors and nurses, and shocked by what she perceived as the cowardice or egotism of others. These experiences would later shape her views on the medical practice, particularly her beliefs in the physician's responsibility for his patients, in the medical profession as self-giving service, in the treatment of the whole person, and in the call to accompany terminally ill patients to the end. In a short biography of von Speyr, von Balthasar lists some of the decisive features of her time in medical school:

[C]omplete contentment when she could finally work with the sick, when she could make silent rounds at night in the wards in order to comfort, to help, to prepare the dying for death; her indignation when patients used in demonstrations in the lecture halls or unwed mothers in the delivery room were not treated with respect for their human dignity; her anger when a doctor, responsible for the death of a patient, put the blame on one of the nurses (Adrienne saw to it that his lectures were boycotted by the entire student body until the doctor had to give up his professorship in Basel); her admiration at the silent asceticism of a large number of the nurses.

"In these and many other experiences", he adds, "Adrienne learned to seek the God whom she had not yet succeeded in truly finding by the way of service to neighbor".

=== Medical practice ===
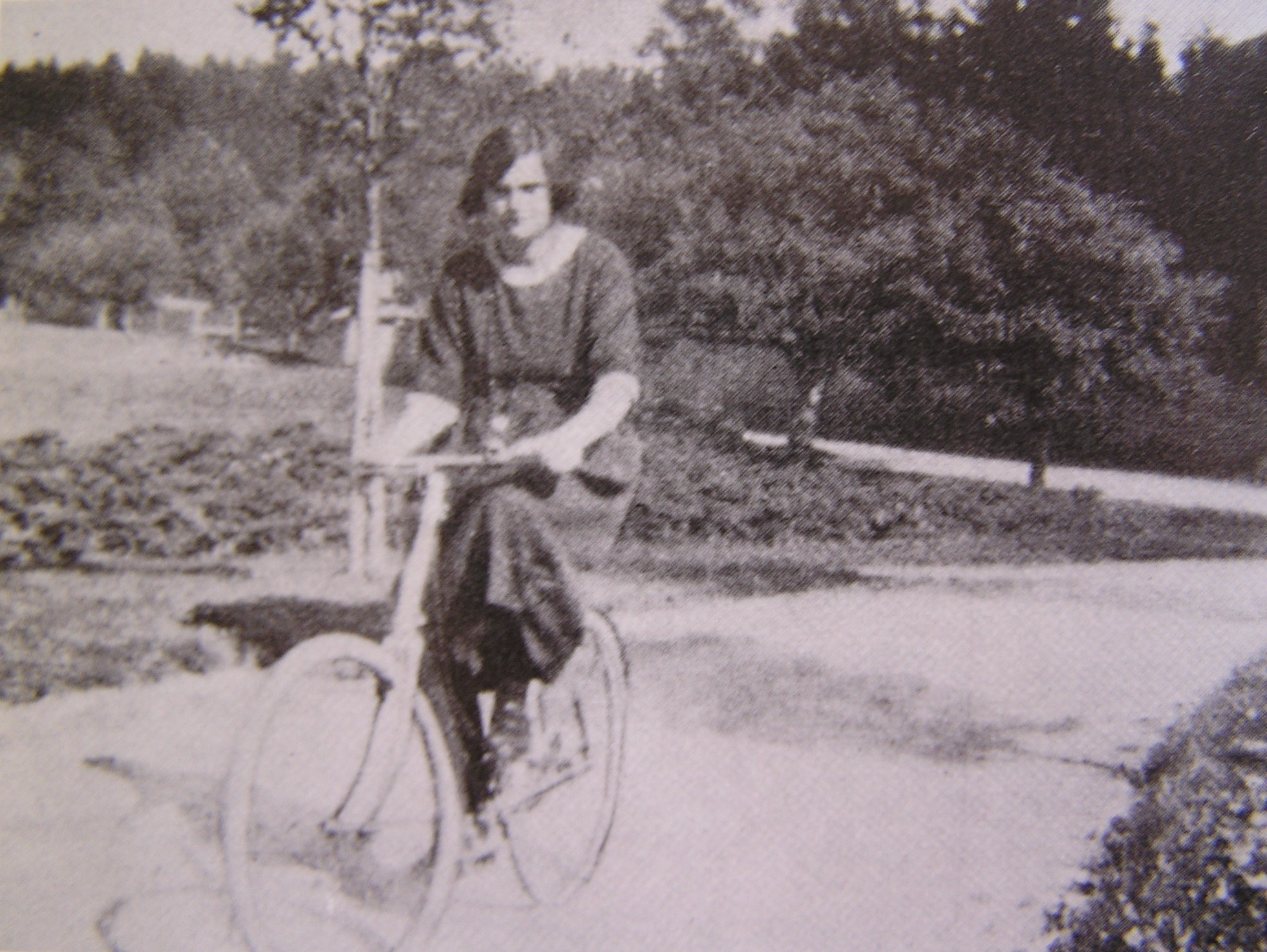
Adrienne von Speyr during a bicycle tour, 1924

In 1930, von Speyr passed her state boards to become a licensed physician, one of the first women in Switzerland to be admitted to the profession. The following year, she started a family medicine practice in Basel. As a doctor, she refused to perform abortions and reportedly dissuaded "thousands of women" from abortion over the course of her career. Since her clientele was mostly poor, she treated many of them free of charge; according to von Balthasar, she “saw as many as sixty to eighty patients a day”. After moving her office to her home for a time during the early 1950s, von Speyr ceased to practice medicine due to illness in 1954.

=== Marriage and family life ===
In 1927, during a trip to San Bernardino, Switzerland, some friends of von Speyr introduced her to the University of Basel historian Emil Dürr, a widower with two young sons. Dürr and von Speyr married, living on the Münsterplatz near the historic Basel Minster church. Von Speyr, who took the name of Dürr, became an adoptive mother to the two boys, Niklaus and Arnold, and played an active role with her husband in upper-class Basel society. She had three miscarriages and bore no children of her own. The couple “seriously considered becoming Catholic”, but Emil died suddenly in a tram accident in 1934, after seven years of marriage. The untimely death of her husband led Adrienne into an interior crisis, provoking her to contemplate suicide until her friend Franz Merke intervened.

The widowed von Speyr continued to raise Niklaus and Arnold on her own and to practice medicine. In 1936, Emil Dürr's friend and colleague Werner Kaegi — who knew the boys and wanted to help raising them – proposed a marriage, and she accepted. Kaegi, a lifelong member of the Swiss Reformed Church, encouraged von Speyr to explore Catholicism, and she converted in 1940. Von Speyr's daughter-in-law Lore Dürr-Freckmann recalls that the couple provided financially for single mothers and opened their home to disadvantaged women and children. Between 1952 and 1967, the Kaegi family also offered a room in their house to Father Hans Urs von Balthasar.

Niklaus and Arnold both married and had a number of children, who considered von Speyr their grandmother. Von Speyr remained close to her sons, daughters-in-law, and grandchildren until her death in 1967. In interviews, her family has described her as joyful, warm, and generous.

=== Conversion ===
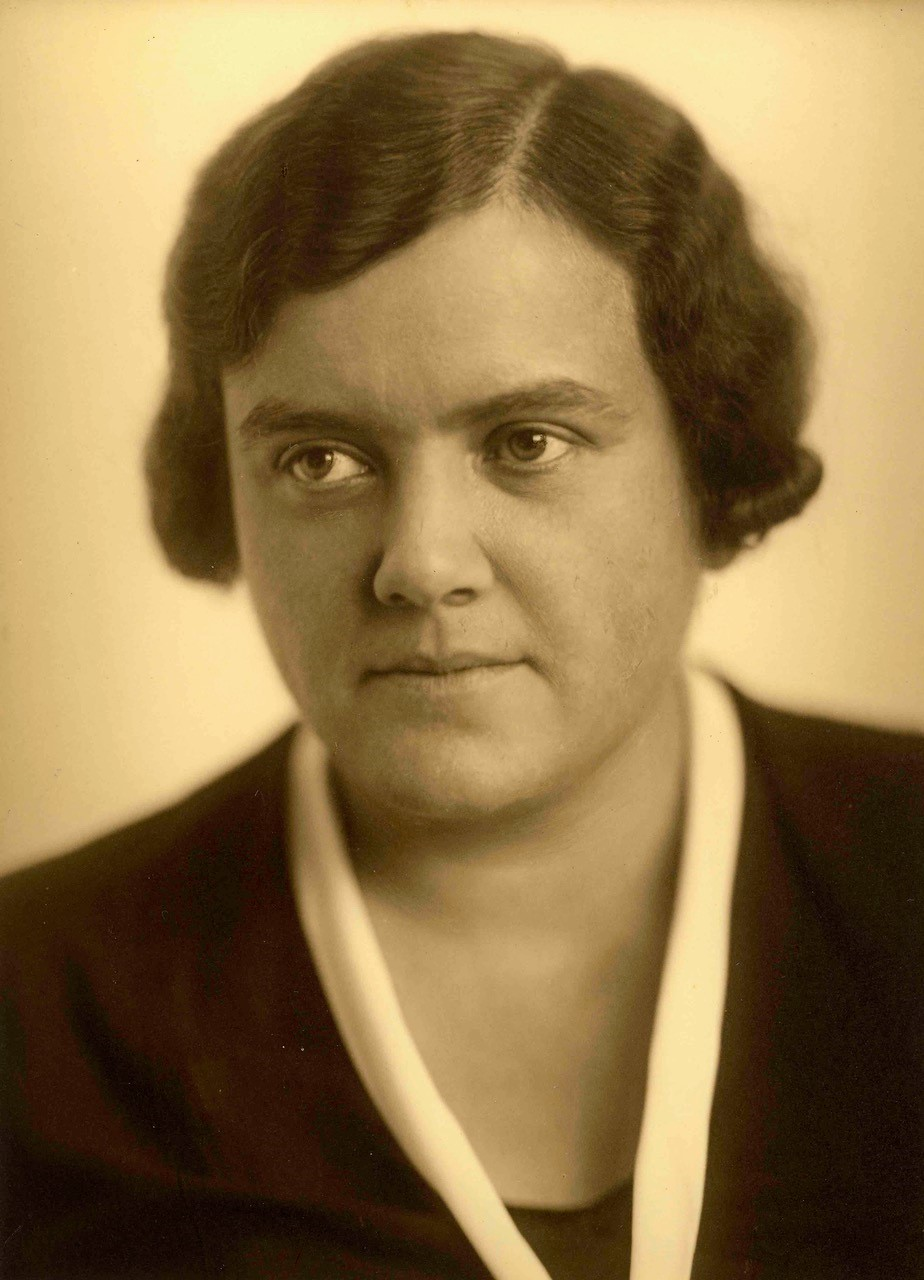
Adrienne von Speyr

Von Speyr began to attend Mass periodically after her husband Emil Dürr’s death in 1934. In the years following his fatal accident, she found it difficult to pray, especially the line “Thy will be done” in the Our Father. After her marriage to Werner Kaegi in 1936, von Speyr made several unsuccessful attempts to contact Catholic priests to receive instruction in the Catholic faith.

In 1940, after recovering from a heart attack, she was introduced by a friend to Father Hans Urs von Balthasar, a Jesuit priest then serving as a university chaplain in Basel. She told him of her interest in entering the Catholic Church, and he began to give her catechetical instruction. Von Balthasar says of this process, “In the instructions she understood everything immediately, as though she had only—and for how long!—waited to hear exactly what I was saying in order to affirm it.” Von Speyr praised the Jesuit for having “removed all the obstacles for me” in prayer. She was received into the Catholic Church on All Saints’ Day, November 1, 1940. After the liturgy, von Speyr apologized for having accidentally omitted the words “extra quam nulla salus” during the profession of faith; when von Balthasar and her husband both replied that they had heard the phrase, she remarked, “Then maybe an angel said it for me”. Still, some scholars have criticized her for leaving out this portion of the profession. She was confirmed shortly after her reception into the Church, with the critic and translator Albert Béguin as her sponsor.

Since von Speyr had many Protestant friends in Basel, her conversion to Catholicism caused some controversy. Her own mother and siblings took a distance from her after her confirmation, though they would reconcile years later. Von Speyr's husband, Werner, supported her embrace of Catholicism, but he himself did not convert. Her sons Niklaus and Arnold, with their children, were eventually received into the Church, along with other family members.

By von Balthasar's account, von Speyr went on to befriend many notable Catholic thinkers in Europe, including Romano Guardini, Hugo Rahner, Erich Przywara, Henri de Lubac, Reinhold Schneider, Annette Kolb, and Gabriel Marcel.

=== Collaboration with Hans Urs von Balthasar ===
In the months following her conversion to Catholicism, von Speyr reported having extraordinary experiences in prayer. Von Balthasar became convinced of the authenticity of von Speyr's mysticism, and the two recognized that they had a shared theological mission.

Between 1944 and 1960, von Speyr dictated to von Balthasar some sixty books of spiritual and Scriptural commentary, including John, Mark, The Letter to the Ephesians, Elijah, and Three Women and the Lord. Given von Speyr's commitments as a mother and a doctor, von Balthasar alone worked to arrange, edit, and publish the texts with ecclesiastical approval through the German-language press Johannes Verlag Einsiedeln. One of her first books to appear was her translation of The Story of a Soul by Saint Thérèse of Lisieux—the first in the German language—followed by Magd des Herrn [Handmaid of the Lord], a book of Marian reflections. Some works, namely those of a more explicitly mystical character, were not released until Pope John Paul II organized a Vatican symposium on von Speyr's work in 1985, almost twenty years after her death.

Von Speyr and von Balthasar also collaborated closely in the founding of the Johannesgemeinschaft (Community of Saint John), a Catholic institute of consecrated laypeople established in 1945. After a long discernment, von Balthasar would eventually leave the Society of Jesus to found this community, since his superiors did not believe it would be compatible with Jesuit life. He saw it as a "personal, special, and non-delegable task." Von Speyr referred to the Johannesgemeinschaft metaphorically as a “Child” she shared with the priest—an analogy that has drawn some criticism but been defended by others. Von Speyr served as the superior of the women's branch of the community until her death.

Von Balthasar, for his part, has stated that his own theological work is inseparable from von Speyr's. “The greater part of so much of what I have written is a translation of what is present in a more immediate, less technical fashion in the powerful work of Adrienne von Speyr.”

=== Later years and death ===
Von Speyr gave up her medical practice in 1954 due to deteriorating health. She suffered from diabetes, heart disease, and severe arthritis, which caused her intense pain and greatly weakened her. According to von Balthasar, “no physician could understand how she could still be alive.” During this period, she prayed, knitted, visited with her grandchildren, wrote letters, read novels, and continued guiding the women in the Johannesgemeinschaft. Members of her family claim that she did not make her illnesses known.

In 1964, von Speyr went blind, and her health slipped into sharp decline. Von Balthasar, who was often present through this time, recounts: “The last months in bed were a continuous, merciless torture, which she bore with great equanimity, always concerned about the others and constantly apologetic about causing me so much trouble.”

On September 17, 1967, the feast of Saint Hildegard of Bingen, von Speyr died in her home in Basel. One of her last phrases was “Que c’est beau de mourir”—“How beautiful it is to die”—and her dying words were "Thank you, thank you, thank you." She was buried in Basel five days later on her sixty-fifth birthday.

== Theology and mysticism ==
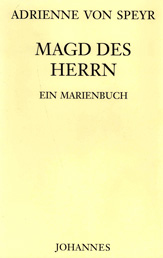
Handmaid of the Lord (Magd des Herrn, 1948), one of the first books published by von Speyr on Johannes Verlag

She is considered by many to have been a mystic and is reputed to have had supernatural experiences of, for example, the Blessed Virgin Mary, the Holy Trinity, a number of saints (including John the Evangelist and Ignatius of Loyola), Christ's Passion, and Hell, as well as incidents of bilocation and stigmata.Aside from her confessor, nobody knew of these reported phenomena during her lifetime, including members of her own religious community. As a doctor, she was also believed to be connected with a number of unexplained healings of patients,often taking on severe penances as a way of sharing in the suffering of others.

Adrienne von Speyr's theological writings—which were generally transcribed, copy edited, and published by Hans Urs von Balthasar—treat a wide range of topics in Catholic spirituality. As L. M. Miles notes in the journal First Things, most of her books are scriptural commentaries and "there is a biblical rather than a dogmatic or systematic organization to her work." These include John (in four volumes), Mark, Letter to the Colossians, Letter to the Ephesians, Three Women and the Lord, Bergpredigt [The Sermon on the Mount], Gleichnisse des Herrn [Parables of the Lord], Die Schöpfung [Creation], Achtzehn Psalmen [Eighteen Psalms], Isaia [Isaiah], and Elijah, among others. She also wrote meditations on Mary (Handmaid of the Lord and Mary in the Redemption), on the Mass (The Holy Mass), on the sacrament of confession (Confession), on the prophets (The Mission of the Prophets), on death (The Mystery of Death), on Christ's Passion (The Passion from Within and The Cross: Word and Sacrament). Some prominent features in her thought include the centrality of Christian obedience and of the Marian fiat, an understanding of God as ever-greater, a Trinitarian approach to prayer, humility and self-effacement as essential Christian attitudes, the attitude of Bereitschaft ("readiness" or "disponsibility") before God, the potential unity between Christian action in the world and action according to God's will, and the reality of Christ's descent into Hell on Holy Saturday. The Spiritual Exercises of Saint Ignatius of Loyola imbue much of her thought.

Von Speyr's more immediately mystical writings were not released until 1985 and vary in theme and style. The work Book of All Saints gives inner portraits of many saints and historical figures in terms of their prayer lives; one Dominican scholar has expressed doubts about her critical description of Saint Thomas Aquinas in the first of her two entries on him. In another posthumous text, Kreuz und Hölle, von Speyr relates her experiences of the Passion and of the descent into Hell, giving illustrations of the metaphysical nature of damnation as isolation and "total depersonalization" in Professor Matthew Sutton's phrase. Some scholars have interpreted these visions as suggesting universalism, or a belief that Hell is empty, but other scholars insist that this is a misreading of the text; Hans Urs von Balthasar himself rejects the universalist reading, understanding von Speyr's experience of Hell as "so real that, in view of it, it would be ridiculous and blasphemous to speak of the nonexistence of hell or even just of apokatastasis [universalism] in the 'systematic' sense." There are critics who dispute the authenticity of von Speyr's visions on other grounds, citing features such as apparent changes of personality and voice and the use of sarcasm, although von Balthasar, who originally related these phenomena, believes these episodes had a pedagogical purpose, to form him in humility as a spiritual director.

== Reception and influence ==
In 1985, the Vatican hosted a colloquium on "Adrienne von Speyr e la sua missione ecclesiale" [Adrienne von Speyr and her ecclesial mission], with presentations by Angelo Scola, Antonio Sicari, Marc Ouellet, Joseph Fessio, SJ and others. Pope John Paul II said in his closing address to the participants:

I would like to take this opportunity to greet the members of the Community of Saint John, which owes its very foundation to a sublime inspiration on the part of Adrienne. She had a special love for "the disciple whom Jesus loved", the last, most profound expositor, as she saw him, of the mystery of Jesus, of the Father’s love for the world, and of the Holy Spirit whose sure hand guides us into the full light of the revelation of Father and Son. Her insight into the inmost communion of faith and love uniting the Mother of Jesus and the one disciple who persevered with her under the Cross was no less profound; it was here that she glimpsed the virginal origin of the Church that would be entrusted to Peter’s care. May this spirituality, which Adrienne embodied with such exemplary vigor, help you to incarnate ever better your own commitment to live in accord with Church and Gospel in the midst of the realities of the contemporary world.

A second symposium was held at the Vatican in 2017 entitled "Adrienne von Speyr: A Woman in the Heart of the 20th Century." The acts of the conference are being published through the Italian press Edizioni Cantagalli.

Poet and playwright T. S. Eliot said of von Speyr's meditations on John, "Von Speyr's book does not lend itself to any classification that I can think of. It is not dogmatic theology; still less is it exegesis.... There is nothing to do but to submit oneself to it; if the reader emerges without having been crushed by it, he will find himself strengthened and exhilarated by a new experience of Christian sensibility."

Theologian Hans Urs von Balthasar claims that most of his own work was primarily inspired by his collaborator von Speyr and her "experiential dogmatics". He puts it in starker terms in First Glance at Adrienne von Speyr: "On the whole I received far more from Adrienne, theologically, than she from me.... As her confessor and spiritual director, I observed her interior life most closely, yet in twenty-seven years I never had the least doubt about the authentic mission that was hers.... [H]er work appears far more important to me than mine.... I am convinced that when her works are made available, those who are in a position to judge will concur with me about their value and will thank God that he has granted such graces to the Church in our time."

The spirituality of Adrienne von Speyr is a pillar of the formation program at the Casa Balthasar, a house of discernment in Rome founded under the auspices of Joseph Ratzinger, and at Heart's Home, an international Catholic missionary organization.

In 2018, French filmmaker Marie Viloin — director of documentaries about Bernadette Soubirous and Faustina Kowalska — produced the half-hour feature Adrienne von Speyr (1902–1967): Sur la terre comme au ciel as a segment of the program Le Jour du Seigneur, broadcast by the national French TV network France 2.

== Beatification process ==
In March 2018, the Diocese of Chur began to consider opening a beatification process for Adrienne Speer together alongside Balthasar's The postulator will be the Argentinian priest Luis Escalante.

== Works ==
- Book of All Saints, edited by Hans Urs von Balthasar, translated by D.C. Schindler, San Francisco 2008. ISBN 978-1-58617-192-6
- Confession, Found at: Ignatius Press, ISBN 978-0-89870-040-4
- Elijah, Found at: Ignatius Press, ISBN 978-0-89870-270-5
- Handmaid of the Lord,Found at: Ignatius Press, ISBN 978-0-89870-042-8
- John, Volume 1, Found at: Ignatius Press, ISBN 978-0-89870-411-2
- John, Volume 2, Found at: Ignatius Press, ISBN 978-0-89870-412-9
- John, Volume 3, Found at: Ignatius Press, ISBN 978-0-89870-111-1
- John, Volume 4, Found at: Ignatius Press, ISBN 978-0-89870-368-9
- Letter to the Colossians, Found at: Ignatius Press Archived 2022-08-10, ISBN 978-0-89870-661-1
- Letter to the Ephesians,Found at: Ignatius Press, ISBN 978-0-89870-570-6
- Light and Images, Found at: Ignatius Press, ISBN 978-0-89870-883-7
- Lumina | New Lumina, Found at: Ignatius Press ISBN 978-1-58617-222-0
- Man before God, ISBN 978-0-89870-882-0
- Mary in the Redemption, ISBN 978-0-89870-955-1
- My Early Years, ISBN 978-0-89870-541-6
- Mystery of Death, ISBN 978-0-89870-204-0
- The Book of All Saints, ISBN 978-1-58617-192-6
- The Boundless God, ISBN 978-0-89870-996-4
- The Christian State of Life, ISBN 978-0-89870-044-2
- The Countenance of the Father, ISBN 978-0-89870-620-8
- The Cross: Word and Sacrament, ISBN 978-0-89870-021-3
- The Gates of Eternal Life, ISBN 978-0-89870-025-1
- The Holy Mass, ISBN 978-0-89870-730-4
- The Mission of the Prophets, ISBN 978-0-89870-593-5
- The Passion from Within, ISBN 978-0-89870-594-2
- They Followed His Call, ISBN 978-0-89870-100-5
- Three Women and the Lord, ISBN 978-0-89870-059-6
- Victory of Love, ISBN 978-0-89870-304-7
- With God and with Men: Prayers, ISBN 978-0-89870-563-8
- World of Prayer, ISBN 978-0-89870-033-6
- Die Nachlasswerke: Das wort und die Mystik: II.Teil: Objektive Mystik (1970)
