= Hans Urs von Balthasar =

Swiss Catholic theologian (1905–1988)

The Reverend Hans Urs von Balthasar
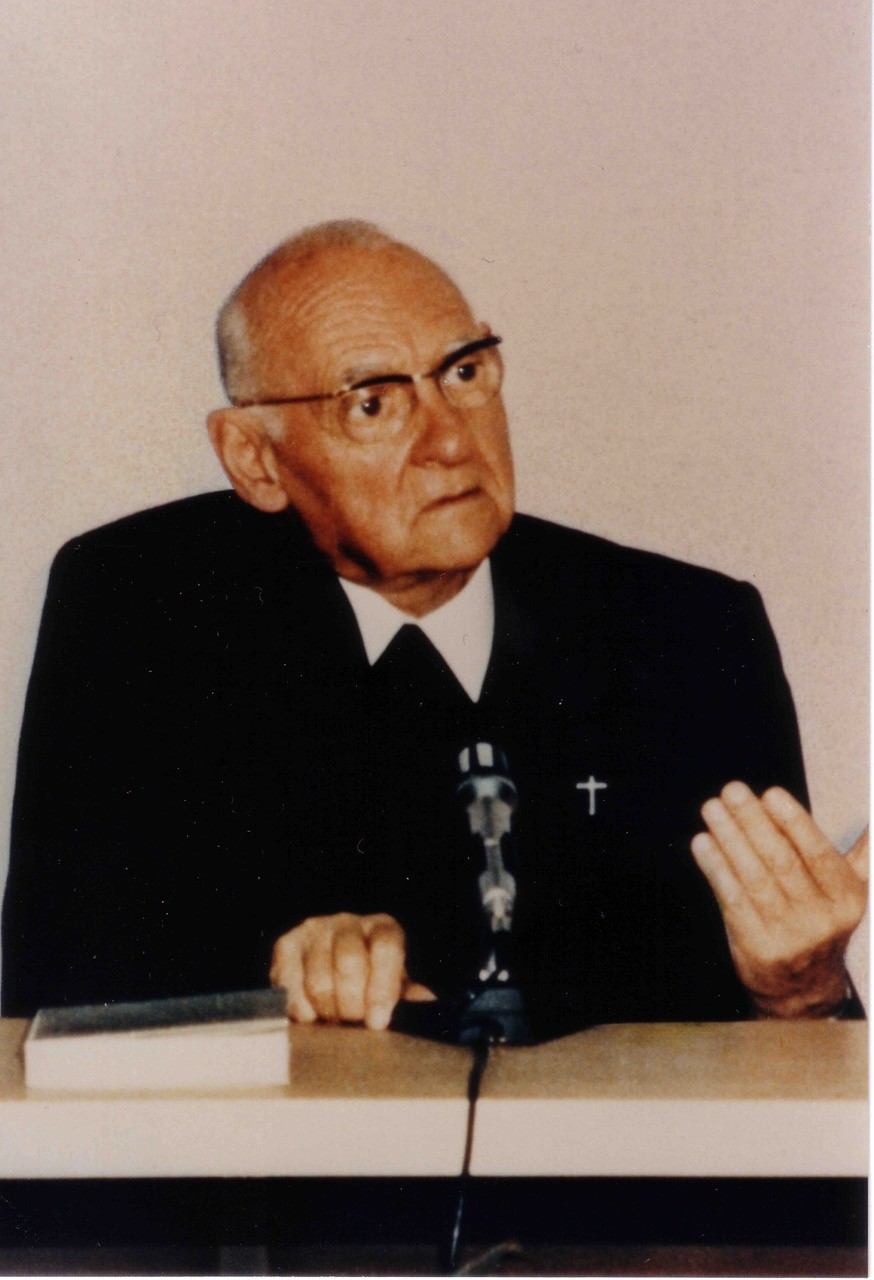
- Born: 12 August 1905; Lucerne, Switzerland
- Died: 26 June 1988 (aged 82); Basel, Switzerland

Academic background
- Influences: Rudolf Allers; Anselm of Canterbury; Thomas Aquinas; Karl Barth; Martin Buber; Henri de Lubac; Johann Wolfgang von Goethe; Romano Guardini; G. W. F. Hegel; Friedrich Hölderlin; Ignatius of Loyola; Irenaeus; Maximus the Confessor; Origen; Plato; Erich Przywara; Adrienne von Speyr; Nicholas of Cusa; Sergei Bulgakov

Academic work
- Discipline: Theology
- Sub-discipline: Christology; soteriology; systematic theology; theological aesthetics
- School or tradition: Nouvelle théologie
- Influenced: Pope Benedict XVI; Klaus Hemmerle; Robert Barron; Angelo Scola; Rowan Williams; John Milbank; David Bentley Hart; Dietrich von Hildebrand; Jean-Luc Marion; Aidan Nichols; Thierry de Roucy; Raymund Schwager; Eric Voegelin; Cyril O'Regan; Stratford Caldecott

Ecclesiastical career
- Religion: Christianity (Roman Catholic)
- Church: Latin Church
- Ordained: 26 July 1936 (priest) by Cardinal Faulhaber

Signature
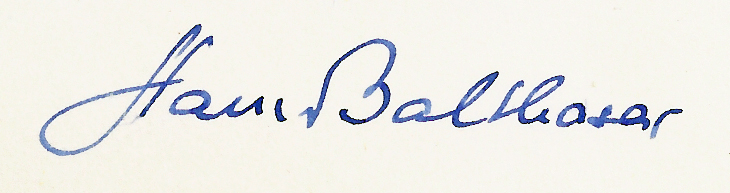

Hans Urs von Balthasar (Swiss Standard German: [ˈhans ˈʊrs fɔn ˈbaltazaːr]; 12 August 1905 – 26 June 1988) was a Swiss theologian and Catholic priest who is considered one of the most important Catholic theologians of the 20th century. With Joseph Ratzinger and Henri de Lubac, he founded the theological journal Communio. Over the course of his life, he authored 85 books, over 500 articles and essays, and almost 100 translations. He is known for his 15-volume trilogy on beauty (The Glory of the Lord), goodness (Theo-Drama), and truth (Theo-Logic).

Pope John Paul II announced his choice of Balthasar to become a cardinal, but he died shortly before the consistory. Ratzinger (later Pope Benedict XVI) said in his funeral oration for Balthasar that "he is right in what he teaches of the faith" and that he "points the way to the sources of living water."

== Life and career ==
=== Early life ===
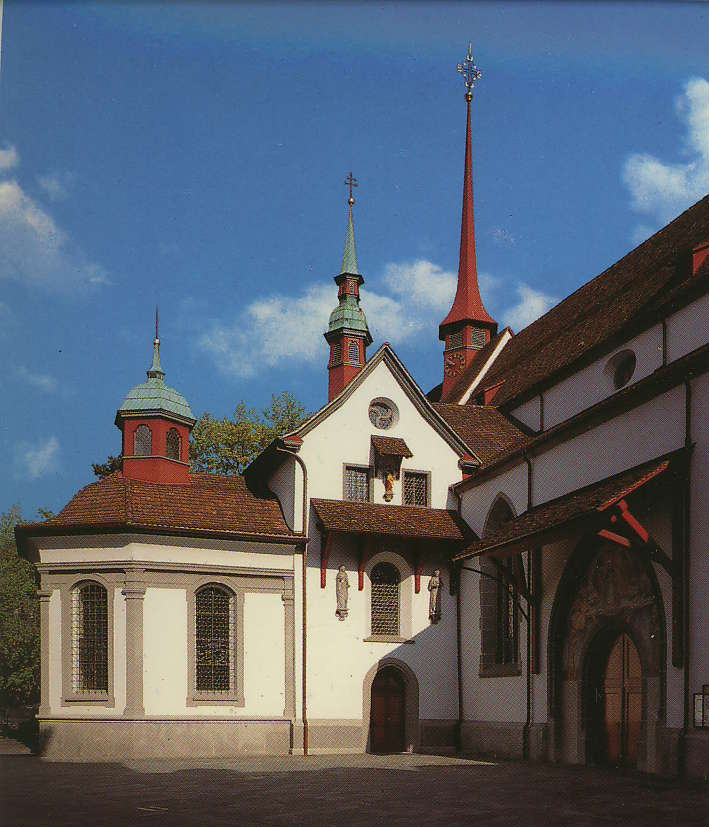
Franziskanerkirche (Franciscan Church) in Lucerne, Switzerland

Balthasar was born in Lucerne, Switzerland, on 12 August 1905, to a patrician family. His father, Oscar Ludwig Carl von Balthasar (1872–1946), was a church architect, and his mother, Gabrielle Pietzcker (d. 1929), helped found the Schweizerischer Katholischer Frauenbund (Swiss League of Catholic Women). Pietzcker was related to the beatified Hungarian bishop Blessed Vilmos Apor, who was shot by Soviet troops in 1945 while trying to protect women from drunken Soviet soldiers. Oscar and Gabrielle had three children. Hans Urs was the eldest. Their son Dieter would join the Swiss Guard. Their daughter Renée (1908–1986) became the superior general of the Franciscan Sisters of Sainte-Marie des Anges. Hans Urs would later describe his family as "straightforwardly Catholic ... I grew up with a faith that was equally straightforward, untroubled by doubt. I can still remember the silent and very moving early Masses on my own in the choir of the Franciscan church in Lucerne and the ten-o'clock Mass in the Jesuit church, which I thought was stunningly beautiful."

As a child, Hans and his family spent much time at the hotel Pension Felsberg, which his grandmother managed. Here, he was regularly exposed to a "cosmopolitan" atmosphere where "trilingualism (German, French, English) [was] taken for granted," as biographer Peter Henrici notes. Hans, who had absolute pitch, was immersed in classical music, particularly Schubert, Tchaikovsky, and Mahler, and this interest would continue through early adulthood. By his own account, he "spent endless hours on the piano". While studying at the University of Vienna, he reportedly would play the piano four hands almost nightly with his roommate Rudolf Allers. Later, as a Jesuit chaplain, he would perform a transcription of Mozart's Don Giovanni from memory.

=== Education ===
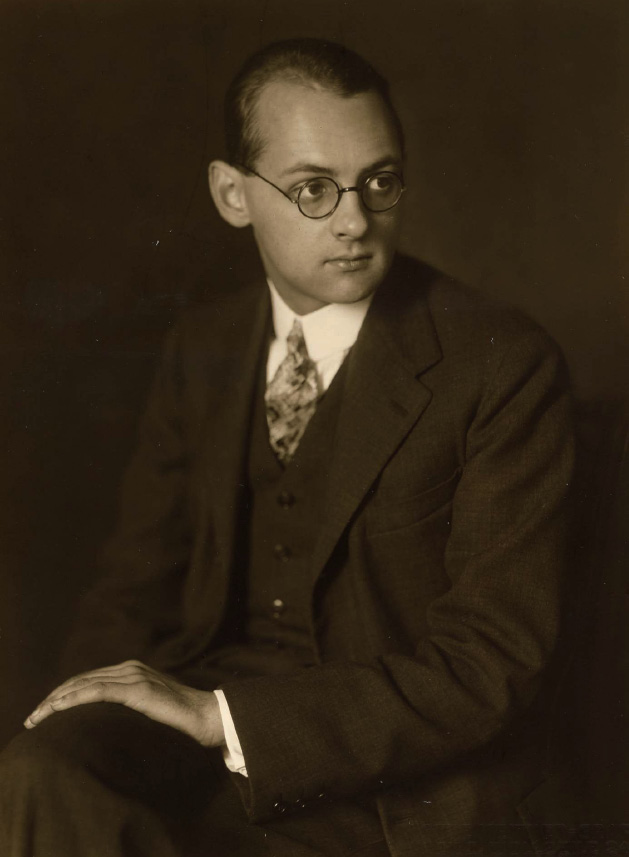
Balthasar in his early twenties, during studies in Vienna

Educated first by Benedictine monks at the abbey school of Engelberg in central Switzerland—during the time of the First World War—Balthasar transferred to the more academically rigorous Stella Matutina, a preparatory school run by the Society of Jesus in Feldkirch, Austria, whose alumni include Arthur Conan Doyle and the Thomist cardinal Franz Ehrle. Aside from music, Balthasar also took a strong interest in literature, later citing Dante and Goethe as key early influences.

A year before graduation from Stella Matutina, he enrolled early at the University of Zurich to study German literature. After stints researching in Vienna and Berlin, he obtained his doctorate in 1928, with a dissertation on the theme of eschatology in German and Germanophone thought, drawing heavily from Catholic theology. Writing in the 1980s, he said of this latter work that "its fundamental impulse was the desire to reveal ... the ultimate religious attitude, often hidden, of the great figures of modern German literature. I wanted to let them, so to speak, 'make their confession'. The work was of insufficient maturity—most of the chapters ought to be rewritten—and yet some of it may still be valid." According to Henrici, submitting a dissertation of this nature to the "Liberal Protestant" University of Zurich was academically risky for a student at that time, but the faculty awarded Balthasar his doctorate summa cum laude.

=== Society of Jesus ===
"I was struck as if by lightning.... I needed only to 'leave everything and follow.'"

— Hans Urs von Balthasar, on his vocation to the Jesuits

Though a practicing Catholic, with "untroubled faith" and "devotion to our Lady", Balthasar had remained largely uninterested in theology and spirituality until his university years. At the University of Vienna—where atheism was prevalent—he was influenced in his religious thinking by Hans Eibl and, more decisively, his friend Rudolf Allers, a convert to Catholicism. While studying in Berlin, he also heard lectures by the theologian Romano Guardini.

In 1929, Balthasar attended a retreat for students in Wyhlen, Germany, and sensed what he believed to be a sudden call to follow Jesus Christ:

Even today [in 1959], after thirty years, I could still find again the tree on the lost path in the Black Forest, not far from Basel, under which I was struck as if by lightning.... [I]t was neither theology nor the priesthood that, at that moment, appeared in a flash before my mind; it was this alone: You have nothing to choose; you are called. You will not serve; another will use you. You have no plans to make; you are only a small little tile in a mosaic that has long been ready. I needed only to "leave everything and follow," without making plans, without wishes or ideas: I needed only to stand there and wait and see what I would be used for—and so it happened.

He understood this experience as having been mediated by the figure of Ignatius of Loyola. Balthasar would later write of Loyola, "I did not choose him; he set me ablaze like a bolt of lightning." On November 18, 1929, Balthasar entered the Society of Jesus in south Germany, not long after the death of his mother. At that time, Jesuit work and ministry was prohibited in Switzerland by constitutional law.

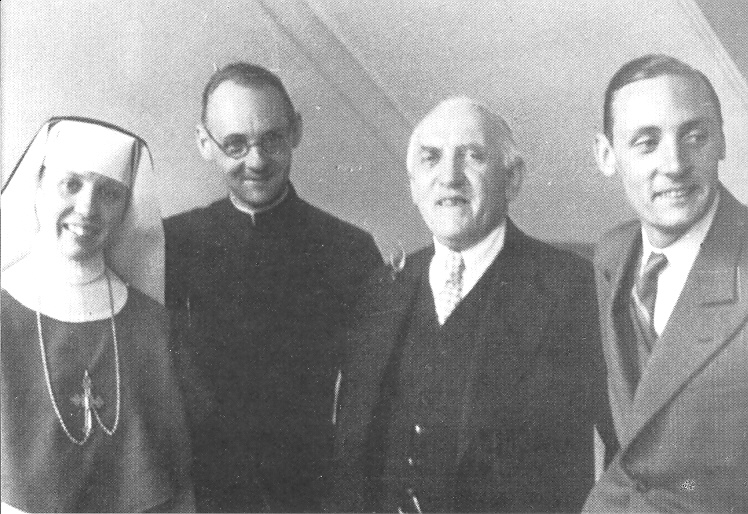
Balthasar (second from left) with his sister, father, and brother

After two years as a Jesuit novice, he studied philosophy at Pullach, near Munich, where he came into contact with Erich Przywara, who formed him in Scholasticism and whose work on the analogia entis impacted him, though he would later express some hesitation about certain aspects of his thought. In 1932, Balthasar moved to Fourvière, the Jesuit school in Lyon, France, for four years of theological study. Here he encountered fellow Jesuits Henri Bouillard, Jean Daniélou, Gaston Fessard, and Henri de Lubac, figures later associated with the nouvelle théologie. De Lubac kindled the young student's interest in the Church Fathers, especially Origen, Gregory of Nyssa, and Maximus the Confessor. In Lyon, Balthasar also encountered the work of French writers Charles Péguy, Georges Bernanos, and Paul Claudel.

Balthasar was ordained a priest on 26 July 1936. As a motto on his ordination card, he used the phrase "Benedixit, fregit, deditque" ("He blessed it, broke it, and gave"), taken from the words of the institution of the Eucharist in the Gospel of Luke. After finishing his theological studies in 1937, he was sent to Munich to work at the journal Stimmen der Zeit, where he remained until 1939. He completed his tertianship with Albert Steger in 1940.

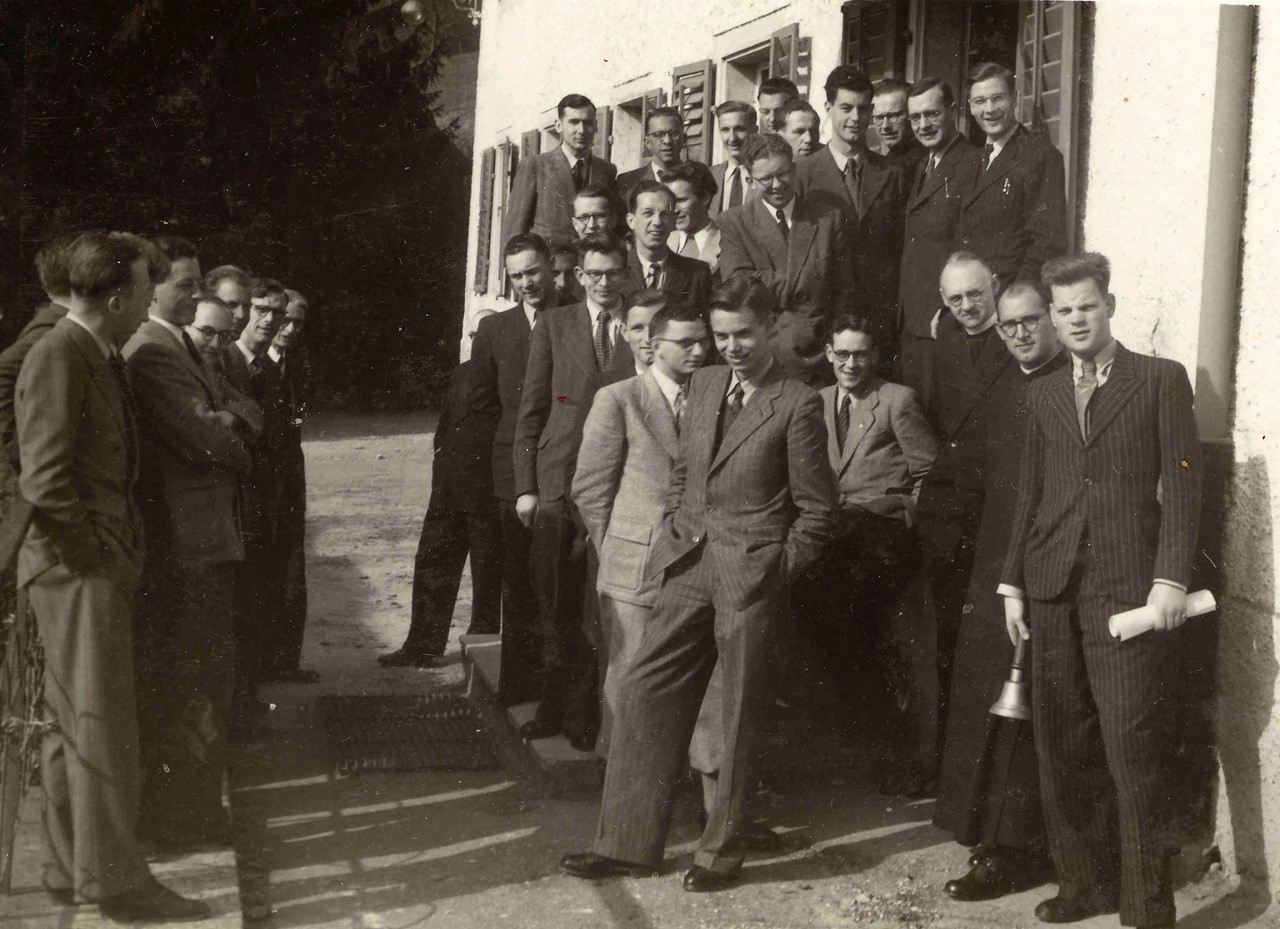
Balthasar (third from right) with the Studentische Schulungsgemeinschaft

When given the choice between a professorship at the Gregorian University in Rome and a role as student chaplain in Basel, Switzerland, he chose the chaplaincy, preferring pastoral work to academia. Moving to Basel in 1940, Balthasar edited the Europaische Reihe literary series for the Sammlung Klosterberg, translated French Resistance poetry, helped to produce plays (including a staging of his own translations of Bernanos' Dialogues of the Carmelites and Claudel's The Satin Slipper), published book-length studies on Maximus the Confessor and Gregory of Nyssa, and regularly lectured to students. He established the Studentische Schulungsgemeinschaft in 1941, an institute for student formation that featured courses and conferences by Hugo Rahner, Martin Buber, Yves Congar, Gustav Siewerth, Henri de Lubac, and others. To the students, Balthasar offered liturgies, sermons, retreats, and spiritual direction, with a particular emphasis on the Spiritual Exercises of Saint Ignatius of Loyola. According to Jacques Servais, "A good number of the young men eventually entered the Society of Jesus, while others decided to remain in the lay state, hoping to find a form of consecration to God in the world."

=== Collaboration with Adrienne von Speyr ===
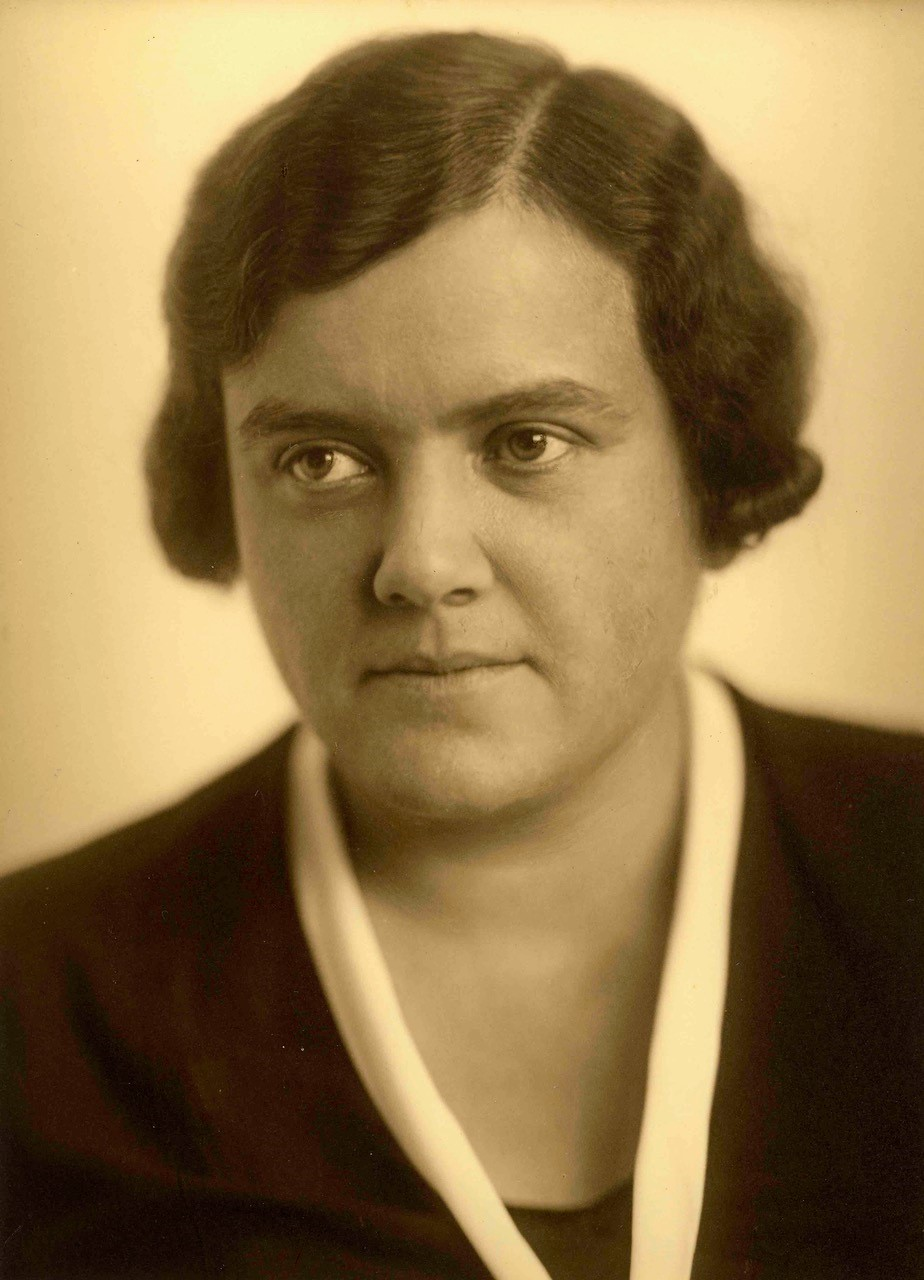
Adrienne von Speyr

During his first months in Basel, he met the physician Adrienne von Speyr through a mutual friend. A mother in her late thirties, and a somewhat prominent figure in Basel society, she was married to the historian Werner Kaegi, with two children from her first marriage to Emil Dürr, who had died suddenly in 1934. She was a Protestant, but interested in becoming Catholic. Balthasar began to offer her catechetical instruction and later said of this process, "In the instructions she understood everything immediately, as though she had only—and for how long!—waited to hear exactly what I was saying in order to affirm it."

Shortly following her reception into the Catholic Church on 1 November 1940—at a liturgy celebrated by Balthasar—Speyr began reporting intense experiences in prayer, including visions of Christ's Passion and encounters with various saints. In Balthasar's words, "A veritable cataract of mystical graces poured over Adrienne in a seemingly chaotic storm that whirled her in all directions at once." He began to accompany her as a spiritual director, in order to help evaluate the experiences. After he became convinced of the authenticity of Speyr's mysticism, Balthasar and Speyr both began to believe that they had a shared theological mission.

Between 1944 and 1960, Speyr dictated to Balthasar some 60 books of spiritual and Scriptural commentary. Given Speyr's responsibilities as a mother and a practicing doctor, Balthasar alone worked to arrange, edit, and publish the texts. In 1947, he founded a publishing house, Johannes Verlag, in Einsiedeln, Switzerland, where he began to print and distribute her works with ecclesiastical imprimatur. Some of Speyr's works, namely those of a more explicitly mystical character, were not released until Pope John Paul II organized a Vatican symposium on her thought in 1985, almost 20 years after her death. In an interview with Angelo Scola in 1986, Balthasar gave a portrait of his relationship with the "extensive theology" of von Speyr:

All I attempted to do was gather it up and embed it in a space, such as the theology of the Fathers, that of the Middle Ages and the modern age, with which I was fairly familiar. My contribution consisted in providing a comprehensive theological horizon, so that all that was new and valid in her thought would not be watered down or falsified, but be given space to unfold. With a mere textbook-theology one could not have captured Adrienne's work; it required a knowledge of the great tradition to realize that her original propositions in no way contradicted it.

Von Speyr and von Balthasar also collaborated closely in the founding of the Johannesgemeinschaft (Community of Saint John), a Catholic institute of consecrated laypeople established in 1945, with a mission to work for the sanctification of the world from within the world. It became more widely known three years later when Balthasar produced a theology for secular institutes in his work Der Laie und der Ordenstand, the first book to be published by Johannes Verlag. After a long discernment, Balthasar would eventually leave the Society of Jesus to found this community, since his superiors did not believe it would be compatible with Jesuit life. He saw it as a "personal, special, and non-delegable task." Speyr referred to the Johannesgemeinschaft metaphorically as a “Child” she shared with the priest—an analogy that has drawn some criticism but been defended by others. Speyr served as the superior of the women's branch of the community until her death.

=== Departure from the Jesuits ===
Beginning in 1945, the year in which he published Das Herz der Welt (Heart of the World), Balthasar met a series of difficulties. He was scheduled to give a Christmas sermon on Swiss public radio, but this was cancelled at the last moment because of the ongoing national constitutional ban on Jesuit activity. The event caused some controversy. In June 1946, his father died, followed not long after by his godmother. In May 1946, Robert Rast, a Jesuit novice who had been his friend and collaborator in the Schulungsgemeinschaft, died of tuberculosis.

That same year, his Jesuit superiors informed him that the Society of Jesus could not be answerable for the Community of Saint John, the secular institute he had begun to organize with Adrienne von Speyr. Feeling that he "was being called by God to certain definite tasks in the Church", he made a 30-day retreat at the request of Father General Jean-Baptiste Janssens, where the director confirmed that Balthasar, while remaining a priest, should leave the Jesuit order to work with the Community of Saint John. Balthasar considered this a "very grave" step, but in 1950, he officially left the Society of Jesus. He renewed his religious vows a few months later. Shortly before his exit from the society, the Ludwig-Maximilians-Universität München offered him a professorship, as a successor to Romano Guardini, but he declined. He remained without a ministerial role in the church until, in 1956, he was incardinated into the Diocese of Chur as a diocesan priest.

=== Lectures, writing, and publishing (1950–1967) ===
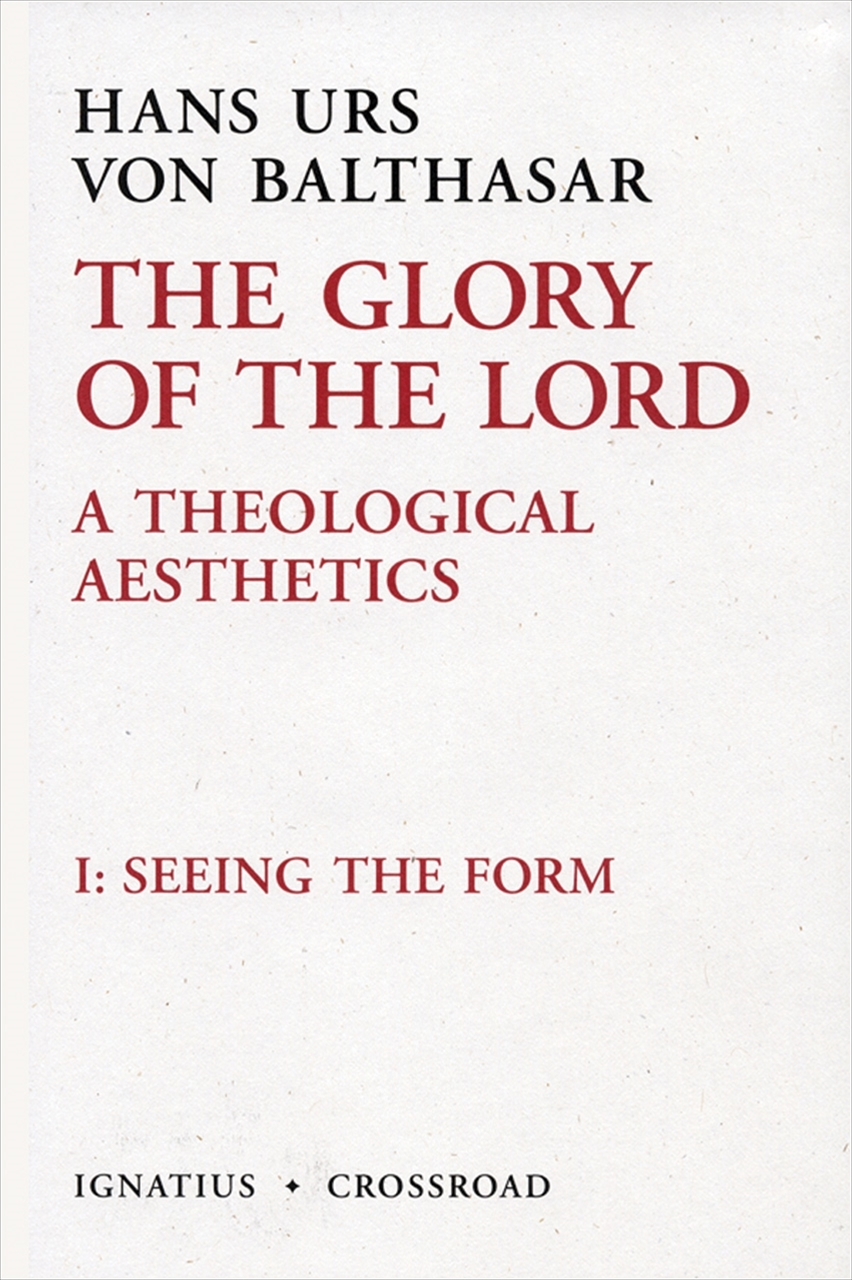
The Glory of the Lord, vol. 1 (2nd English ed., Ignatius Press, 2009)

Balthasar's exit from the Jesuits left him "literally on the street", as biographer Peter Henrici notes, and he took up lecture tours across Germany, which helped him provide for himself and fund the Johannes Verlag publishing house. He also continued giving retreats to young people. Between 1950 and 1956, he authored a number of books and articles, including Therese von Lisieux (Thérèse of Lisieux) (1950), Schleifung der Bastionen (Razing the Bastions) (1952), Das betrachtende Gebet (Prayer) (1955), and Die Gottesfrage des heutigen Menschen (The God Question and Modern Man) (1956), as well as monograph studies of Georges Bernanos, Karl Barth, and Reinhold Schneider. Much of his work during this period—written after the release of Pope Pius XII's apostolic constitution Provida Mater Ecclesia, which gave an ecclesiastical blessing to secular institutes—confronts the question of how Christian discipleship might be lived from within the world.

After he was welcomed into the Diocese of Chur, he settled in the city of Basel, hosted by his married friends Werner Kaegi and Adrienne von Speyr, in whose home he remained until 1967. During this period—although he was diagnosed with leukemia in 1958—Balthasar wrote prolifically, most notably the seven-volume work Herrlichkeit (The Glory of the Lord) (1961–1967), which was to serve as the first part of a theological trilogy on the three classical transcendentals of beauty, goodness, and truth. He also translated and edited for Johannes Verlag, with an emphasis on the writing of his collaborator Speyr. Balthasar was not invited to take part in the Second Vatican Council, which took place during this time, but after the release of Herrlichkeit, his theological reputation would grow significantly.

Adrienne von Speyr, who had been seriously ill since the mid-1950s, died on September 17, 1967, and Balthasar assumed responsibility for the Community of Saint John.

=== Later years: Communio and ecclesiastical honors ===
Moving to another house in Basel, Balthasar continued to write, edit, and translate extensively.

In 1969, Pope Paul VI appointed him to the International Theological Commission. He worked as a theological secretary at the Second Ordinary General Assembly of the Synod of Bishops in 1971, penning the synod document on priestly spirituality, and he also received the Romano Guardini Prize from the Catholic Academy of Bavaria. With Joseph Ratzinger and Henri de Lubac, he founded the international theological journal Communio in 1971, with collaboration from members of the Italian Communion and Liberation movement, including Angelo Scola. The journal was conceived as a more traditionally minded alternative to the progressive Concilium, and Balthasar described its mission in terms of courage: "[T]his truth we believe in strips us bare. Like lambs among wolves. It is not a matter of bravado, but of Christian courage, to expose oneself to risk." Karol Wojtyła became the editor of the Polish edition of the review.

Later in the 1970s, he was given fellowships at the British Academy and the Académie des Sciences Morales et Politiques, in addition to prizes for translation. In 1984 John Paul II awarded him the first Paul VI International Prize for his contributions to theology. The following year saw an official Vatican symposium on the life and work of Adrienne von Speyr, which closed with a laudatory closing address by the pope.

=== Death ===
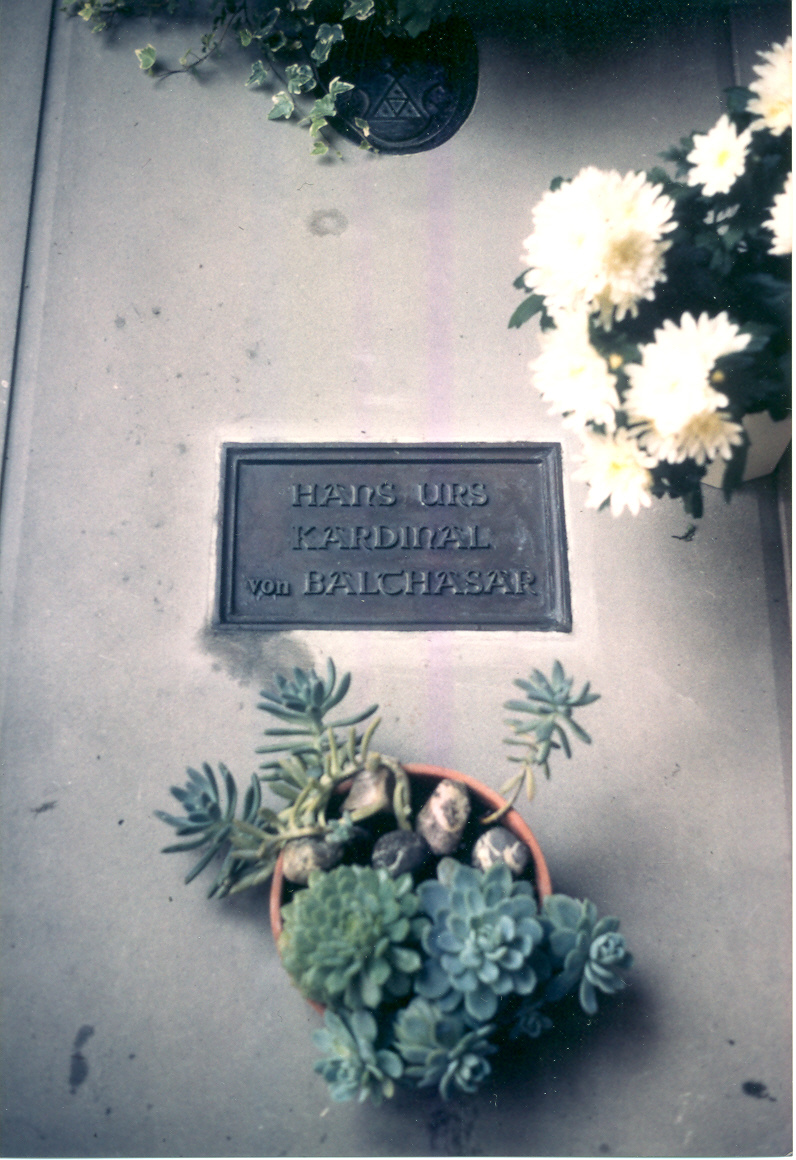
Tomb of von Balthasar, Church of St. Leodegar im Hof, Lucerne

From the low point of being banned from teaching as a result of his leaving the Society of Jesus, Balthasar's reputation had risen to the extent that John Paul II announced plans to make him a cardinal on 29 May 1988. He died, however, in his home in Basel on 26 June 1988, two days before the ceremony which would have granted him that rank. He is buried in the cemetery of the Church of St. Leodegar im Hof (Hofkirche) in Lucerne.

== Theology ==
Along with Karl Rahner and Bernard Lonergan, Balthasar sought to offer a response to Western modernity, which posed a challenge to traditional Catholic thought. While Rahner offered a progressive, accommodating position on modernity and Lonergan worked out a philosophy of history that sought to critically appropriate modernity, Balthasar resisted the reductionism and human focus of modernity, wanting Christianity to be more challenging toward modern sensibilities. Balthasar is eclectic in his approach, sources, and interests and remains difficult to categorize. An example of his eclecticism was his long study and conversation with the influential Reformed Swiss theologian Karl Barth, on whose work he wrote the first Catholic analysis and response. Although Balthasar's major points of analysis on Barth's work have been disputed, his book The Theology of Karl Barth: Exposition and Interpretation (1951) remains a classic work for its sensitivity and insight; Barth himself agreed with its analysis of his own theological enterprise, calling it the best book on his own theology. A distinctive thought in Balthasar's work is that our first experience after birth is the face of love of our mothers, where the "I" encounters for the first time the "Thou", and the "Thou" smiles in a relationship of love and sustenance.

== Writings and thought ==
=== Trilogy ===
Balthasar was better known for his sixteen-volume systematic theological "trilogy", published between 1961 and 1987, with a concluding "epilog" ("epilogue"). It is called a trilogy because it is divided into three parts: Herrlichkeit (The Glory of the Lord), Theodramatik (Theo-Drama), and Theologik (Theo-Logic). They follow the threefold self-description of Jesus in the Gospel of John 14:6 ("I am the way, the truth, and the life") and therefore the transcendentals bonum, verum, and pulchrum (the good, the true, and the beautiful), although the trilogy begins with Herrlichkeit, a study of the pulchrum, the beautiful.

==== Herrlichkeit (The Glory of the Lord) ====
Herrlichkeit is a seven-volume work on theological aesthetics. One of the most often quoted passages from the trilogy comes from the first volume, Schau der Gestalt (Seeing the Form): "Before the beautiful—no, not really before but within the beautiful—the whole person quivers. He not only 'finds' the beautiful moving; rather, he experiences himself as being moved and possessed by it."

1. Schau der Gestalt (Seeing the Form) (1961)
2. Fächer der Stile: Klerikale Stile (Studies in Theological Style: Clerical Styles) (1962)
3. Fächer der Stile: Laikale Stile (Studies in Theological Style: Lay Styles) (1962)
4. Im Raum der Metaphysik: Altertum (The Realm of Metaphysics in Antiquity) (1965)
5. Im Raum der Metaphysik: Neuzeit (The Realm of Metaphysics in the Modern Age) (1965)
6. Theologie: Alter Bund (Theology: The Old Covenant) (1967)
7. Theologie: Neuer Bund (Theology: The New Covenant) (1967)

According to Cyril O'Regan of the University of Notre Dame, "Aquinas is hardly absent from the three thousand pages of Glory of God" and "nowhere throughout the trilogy do we find a trace of Thomistic triumphalism in which Aquinas is considered to be the philosopher and theologian of the Catholic church."

==== Theodramatik (Theo-Drama) ====
Theodramatik is a five-volume work of "theological dramatic theory", examining the ethics and goodness in the action of God and in man's response, especially in the events of Good Friday, Holy Saturday, and Easter Sunday. Balthasar's soteriology, christology, and eschatology are here developed.

1. Prolegomena (Prolegomena) (1973)
2. Die Personen des Spiels: Der Mensch in Gott (Dramatis Personae: Man in God) (1976)
3. Die Personen des Spiels: Die Personen in Christus (Dramatis Personae: Persons in Christ) (1978)
4. Die Handlung (The Action) (1981)
5. Das Endspiel (The Last Act) (1983)

==== Theologik (Theo-Logic) ====
Theologik is a three-volume work on "theological logical theory" describing the truth about the relation of the nature of Jesus Christ (christology) to reality itself (ontology, or the study of being). Volume 1, Wahrheit der Welt (Truth of the World), originally appeared as a standalone book in 1947, but was released with some revision in 1985 as the first part of Theologik.

1. Wahrheit der Welt (Truth of the World) (1985)
2. Wahrheit Gottes (Truth of God) (1985)
3. Der Geist der Wahrheit (The Spirit of Truth) (1987)

=== Apokalypse der deutschen Seele ===
Balthasar's first major work, the three-volume Apokalypse der deutschen Seele (Apocalypse of the German Soul), written from 1937 to 1939, was an expansion of his doctoral dissertation and a study in German literature, theology, and philosophy. Published in Germany and Austria during the Third Reich, one scholar has argued that the work contains anti-Semitism. Balthasar later remarked on the Apokalypse, "The work was of insufficient maturity—most of the chapters ought to be rewritten—and yet some of it may still be valid."

=== Other works ===
Balthasar also wrote of the lives of saints and Church Fathers. Saints appear as an example of the lived Christian life throughout his writings. Instead of merely systematic analysis of theology, Balthasar described his theology as a "kneeling theology" deeply connected to contemplative prayer and as a "sitting theology" intensely connected to faith seeking understanding guided by the heart and mind of the Catholic Church.

Balthasar was very concerned that his writings address spiritual and practical issues. He insisted that his theology never be divorced from the mystical experiences of his long-time friend and convert, the physician Adrienne von Speyr.

Balthasar published varied works spanning many decades, fields of study (e.g., literature and literary analysis, lives of the saints, and the Church Fathers), and languages.

Balthasar used the expression Casta Meretrix to argue that the term Whore of Babylon was acceptable in a certain tradition of the Church, in the writings of Rabanus Maurus for instance.

At Balthasar's funeral, Cardinal Joseph Ratzinger, later to become Pope Benedict XVI, said, speaking of Balthasar's work in general: "What the pope intended to express by this mark of distinction [i.e., elevation to the cardinalate], and of honor, remains valid; no longer only private individuals but the Church itself, in its official responsibility, tells us that he is right in what he teaches of the faith."

=== Debate on Hell, hope, and salvation ===
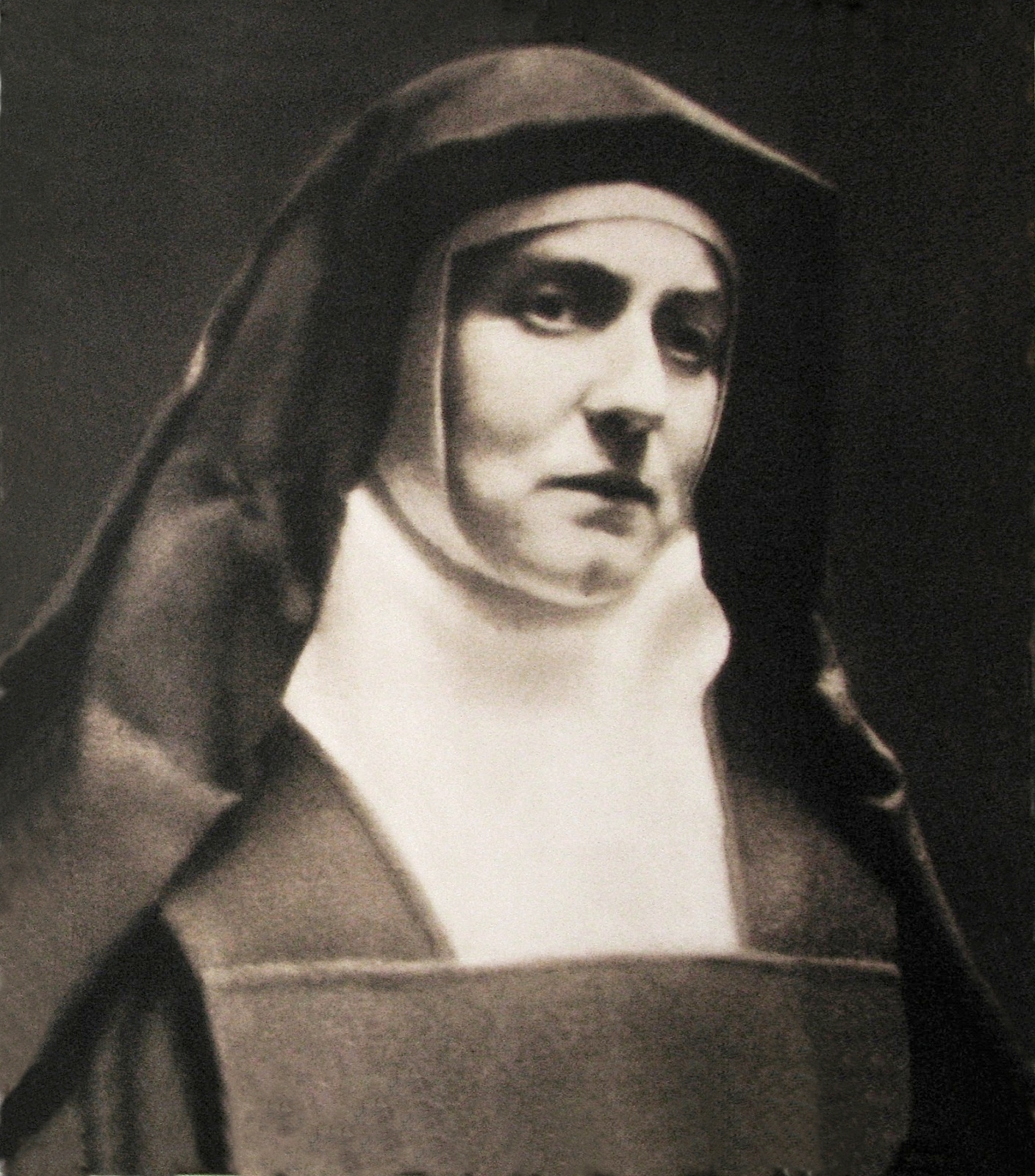
Saint Teresia Benedicta of the Cross (Edith Stein)

In light of the 1987 book Was dürfen wir hoffen? [English title: Dare We Hope "That All Men Be Saved"?], a number of critics have accused Balthasar of implicitly advocating universalism or apocatastasis, the teaching that all people will inherit eternal life, often associated with Origen. Many, however, reject this criticism as a misreading of the theologian's work. Balthasar himself denounces the doctrine of definite universal salvation and affirms the concrete possibility of being damned, while insisting on the Christian duty to hope charitably that each person will be saved: "Thomas Aquinas taught that 'one can hope for eternal life for the other as long as one is united with him through love,' and from which of our brothers would it be permissible to withhold this love?" Ralph Martin and James O'Connor hold that Balthasar's denial of universalism is incomplete, given his prominent use of a quote by Discalced Carmelite saint Edith Stein in his book-length essay Kleiner Diskurs über die Hölle (A Short Discourse on Hell, included in the English translation of Dare We Hope), which references an "infinitely improbable" resistance to grace. Stein writes:

All-merciful love can thus descend to everyone. We believe that it does so. And now, can we assume that there are souls that remain perpetually closed to such love? As a possibility in principle, this cannot be rejected. In reality, it can become infinitely improbable—precisely through what preparatory grace is capable of effecting in the soul. It can do no more than knock at the door, and there are souls that already open themselves to it upon hearing this unobtrusive call. Others allow it to go unheeded. Then it can steal its way into souls and begin to spread itself out there more and more... If all the impulses opposed to the spirit have been expelled from the soul, then any free decision against this has become infinitely improbable.

After witnessing the horrors of Nazism, Teresa Benedicta of the Cross later appeared to have come around to this more pessimistic view, saying that "The possibility of some final loss appears more real and pressing than one which would seem infinitely improbable." Defending Balthasar, Cardinal Avery Dulles interprets this passage as an "orthodox" expression of "hope" rather than a systematic soteriological doctrine. Other scholars have similarly recognized this distinction in the theologian's work more generally. Balthasar responded to allegations of heresy after the publication of Was dürfen wir hoffen? by asking, "How can anyone equate hoping with knowing? I hope that my friend will recover from his serious illness—do I therefore know this?" As Alyssa Pitstick phrases it, universal salvation, if it happens, would be the result of the "utter abandonment the Son undergoes". In A Short Discourse on Hell, Balthasar lists Erich Przywara, Henri de Lubac, Gaston Fessard, Maurice Blondel, Charles Péguy, Paul Claudel, Gabriel Marcel, Léon Bloy, Joseph Ratzinger, Walter Kasper, Romano Guardini, and Karl Rahner as Catholic thinkers who share his perspective on hope—"In summa: a company in which one can feel quite comfortable."

=== "Theology of Holy Saturday" and "eternal super-kenosis" ===
The debate on Balthasar's "Theology of Holy Saturday" and "Christ's descent into Hell", particularly as outlined in the last volume of the book Theo-Drama, is still quite contentious. Following the magisterial principle expressed by the Fathers of the Church according to which "that what has not been taken up by Christ is not made whole" (Gregory of Nazianzus in Epistle 101: "For that which He has not assumed He has not healed", Latin: quod non est assumptum non est sanatum or quod non assumpsit, non redemit), then the redemption would be complete not with his death on the cross but only with the katabasis of his descensio ad inferos. Joseph Ratzinger called Theo-Drama a "profound analysis of the essence of Christian hope" and a "foundational contribution" to the theological field of eschatology. However, while writing the trilogy, Balthasar belatedly realized that his soteriological argument arises not from the Christological kenosis or kenotic Christology, but from a theology of the Cross shifted from the economic to the immanent Trinity, constituting an essential characteristic of it: the oblativity of Christian divine love would be an "eternal super-kenosis". Since the transcendentals are "properties of being", pulchrum, bonum et verum derive from the Ens, just as in the aforementioned Gospel self-definition of Jesus "the way, the truth and the life" are consequential aspects of "I am." In Christian Wolff's terms, general metaphysics must be posited as a prerequisite for the distinction between the three special metaphysics.

== Reception ==
Pope Benedict XVI described Balthasar and Henri de Lubac as the two theologians he appreciated the most. In a 2016 interview, he claimed he shared an "inward intention" and "vision" with Balthasar, remarking positively, "It is unbelievable what this person has written and done."

Balthasar's dramatic theory in Theo-Drama influenced the work of Raymund Schwager.

Balthasar's major writings have been translated into English, and the journal he co-founded with Henri de Lubac, Karl Lehmann, and Joseph Ratzinger, Communio, currently appears in 12 languages. In delivering his eulogy, Ratzinger, quoting de Lubac, called Balthasar "perhaps the most cultured man of our time".

Balthasar has also been highly influential in the work of Bishop Robert Barron, who has been an ardent advocate of Balthasar's soteriology.

== Works ==
The most comprehensive printed bibliography (223 pages, including translations up to 2005) available of all of Balthasar's writings is: Capol, Cornelia; Müller, Claudia, eds. (2005). Hans Urs von Balthasar: Bibliographie 1925-2005. Einsiedeln: Johannes Verlag. ISBN 978-3894110291.

- The Christian and Anxiety (1951)
- Christian Meditation (1984)
- The Christian State of Life (1977)
- Convergences (1969)
- Cosmic Liturgy: The Universe According to Maximus the Confessor (1941)
- Credo (1988)
- Dare We Hope "That All Men Be Saved"? with a Short Discourse on Hell (1986/1987)
- Does Jesus Know Us? Do We Know Him? (1980)
- Elucidations (1971)
- Engagement with God (1971)
- Epilogue (1987)
- Explorations in Theology, Vol. 1: The Word Made Flesh (1960)
- Explorations in Theology, Vol. 2: Spouse of the Word (1961)
- Explorations in Theology, Vol. 3: Creator Spirit (1967)
- Explorations in Theology, Vol. 4: Spirit and Institution (1974)
- Explorations in Theology, Vol. 5: Man Is Created (1986)
- A First Glance at Adrienne von Speyr (1968)
- The Glory of the Lord: A Theological Aesthetics, Vol. 1: Seeing the Form (1961)
- The Glory of the Lord: A Theological Aesthetics, Vol. 2: Studies in Theological Style: Clerical Styles (1962)
- The Glory of the Lord: A Theological Aesthetics, Vol. 3: Studies in Theological Style: Lay Styles (1962)
- The Glory of the Lord: A Theological Aesthetics, Vol. 4: The Realm of Metaphysics in Antiquity (1965)
- The Glory of the Lord: A Theological Aesthetics, Vol. 5: The Realm of Metaphysics in the Modern Age (1965)
- The Glory of the Lord: A Theological Aesthetics, Vol. 6: The Old Covenant (1967)
- The Glory of the Lord: A Theological Aesthetics, Vol. 7: The New Covenant (1969)
- The Grain of Wheat: Aphorisms (1944)
- Heart of the World (1944)
- In the Fullness of the Faith: On the Distinctively Catholic (1975)
- The Laity in the Life of the Counsels (1993)
- Life Out of Death: Meditations on the Paschal Mystery (1984)
- Light of the Word (1987)
- Love Alone is Credible (1963)
- Mary for Today (1987)
- The Moment of Christian Witness (1966)
- My Work in Retrospect (1990)
- Mysterium Paschale: The Mystery of Easter (1969, second edition in 1983)
- The Office of Peter and the Structure of the Church (1974)
- Our Task (1984)
- Paul Struggles with His Congregation (1988)
- Prayer (1955) (German title: Das Betrachtende Gebet "Contemplative Prayer")
- Priestly Spirituality (2007)
- Razing the Bastions (1952)
- Romano Guardini: Reform from the Source (1970)
- A Short Primer for the Unsettled Layman (1980)
- Theo-Drama-Theological Dramatic Theory, Vol. 1; Prologomena (1973)
- Theo-Drama-Theological Dramatic Theory, Vol. 2: Dramatis Personae: Man in God (1976)
- Theo-Drama-Theological Dramatic Theory, Vol. 3: Dramatis Personae: Persons in Christ (1978)
- Theo-Drama-Theological Dramatic Theory, Vol. 4: The Performance (1980)
- Theo-Drama-Theological Dramatic Theory, Vol. 5: The Last Act (1983)
- The Theology of Henri de Lubac: An Overview (1976)
- A Theology of History (1959)
- The Theology of Karl Barth (1951)
- Theo-Logic, Vol. 1: Truth of the World (1985)
- Theo-Logic, Vol. 2: Truth of God (1986)
- Theo-Logic, Vol. 3: The Spirit of Truth (1987)
- The Threefold Garland (1977)
- To the Heart of the Mystery of Redemption (1980)
- Truth is Symphonic: Aspects of Christian Pluralism (1972)
- Two Sisters in the Spirit (1970)
- Unless You Become Like This Child (1988)
- Who is a Christian? (1965)

== See also ==
- Paul Evdokimov
- Philokalia

Awards
| Preceded by Ignazio Silone | Gottfried-Keller-Preis; 1975 | Succeeded by Elias Canetti |
| New award | Paul VI Prize; 1983 | Succeeded by Olivier Messiaen |
