= Aidan Nichols bibliography =

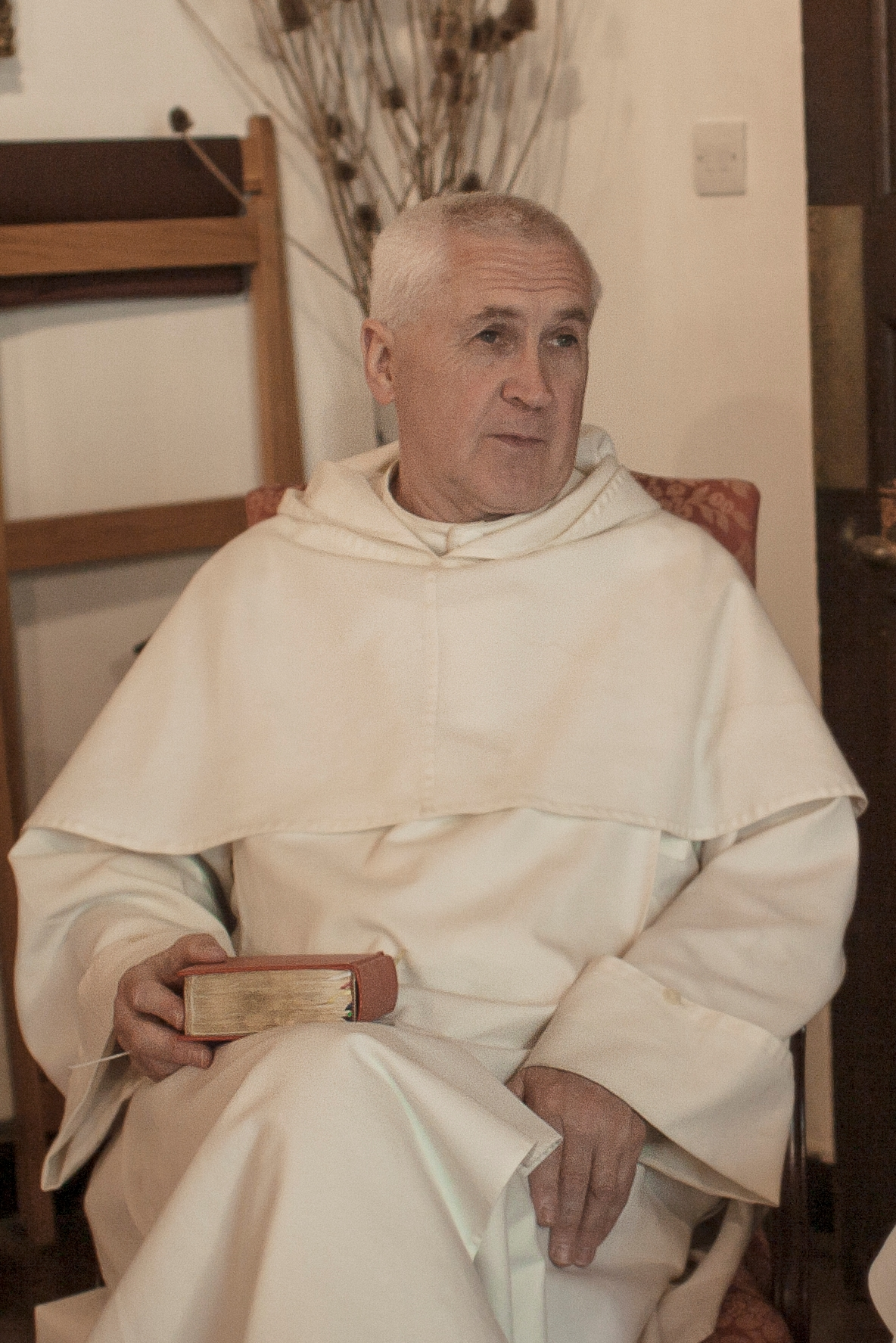
Aidan Nichols in 2014

A list of works by or about Aidan Nichols OP, English academic and Catholic priest.

== Books ==
- The Art of God Incarnate: Theology and Image in Christian Tradition (1980; Wipf and Stock 2016 ISBN 9781498297486)
- The Theology of Joseph Ratzinger: An Introductory Study (1988) ISBN 9780567291486
- Yves Congar, Outstanding Christian Thinkers (Morehouse-Barlow, 1989) ISBN 9780225665376
- Theology in the Russian Diaspora: Church, Fathers, Eucharist in Nikolai Afanas'ev (1893–1966) (Cambridge University Press, 1990) ISBN 9780521365437
- From Newman to Congar: The Idea of Doctrinal Development from the Victorians to the Second Vatican Council (1990) ISBN 9780567291813
- A Grammar of Consent: The Existence of God in Christian Tradition (University of Notre Dame Press, 1991) ISBN 9780268010263
- The Holy Eucharist: From the New Testament to Pope John Paul II (1991) ISBN 9781610978453
- The Shape of Catholic Theology: An Introduction to Its Sources, Principles, and History (Liturgical Press, 1991) ISBN 9780814619094
- Holy Order: The Apostolic Ministry from the New Testament to the Second Vatican Council (Ignatius Press, 1991) ISBN 9781853901751
- The Panther and the Hind: A Theological History of Anglicanism (T&T Clark, 1992) ISBN 9780567292322
- Rome and the Eastern Churches: A Study in Schism (Ignatius, 1992) ISBN 9781586172824
- Byzantine Gospel: Maximus the Confessor in Modern Scholarship (1994) ISBN 9781532680502
- The Splendour of Doctrine: The Catechism of the Catholic Church on Christian Believing (1995) ISBN 9781610978439
- Looking at the Liturgy: A Critical View of Its Contemporary Form (Ignatius Press, 1996)
- The Service of Glory: The Catechism of the Catholic Church on Worship, Ethics, Spirituality (1997) ISBN 9780567085559
- The Word Has Been Abroad: A Guide Through Balthasar's Aesthetics (Catholic University of America Press, 1998)
- Christendom Awake: On Re-Energising the Church in Culture (T & T Clark International, 2000) ISBN 9780567086730
- No Bloodless Myth: A Guide Through Balthasar's Dramatics (Catholic University of America Press, 2000) ISBN 9780813209814
- Say It Is Pentecost: A Guide Through Balthasar's Logic (Catholic University of America, 2001) ISBN 9780813210780
- A Pope and a Council on the Sacred Liturgy: Pope Pius XII's Mediator Dei and the Second Vatican Council's Sacrosanctum Concilium With a Comparative Study a Tale of Two Documents (2002)
- Beyond the Blue Glass: Catholic Essays on Faith and Culture (Saint Austin Press, 2002) ISBN 9781901157161
- Discovering Aquinas: An Introduction to His Life, Work and Influence (2002)
- Epiphany: A Theological Introduction to Catholicism (2002)
- A Spirituality for the Twenty First Century (Our Sunday Visitor, 2003) ISBN 9781931709545
- Scattering the Seed: A Guide Through Balthasar's Early Writings on Philosophy And the Arts Catholic University of America Press (2006)
- The Thought of Pope Benedict XVI: An Introduction to the Theology of Joseph Ratzinger (2007)
- Redeeming Beauty: Soundings in Sacral Aesthetics (2007)
- Divine Fruitfulness: A Guide to Balthasar's Theology beyond the Trilogy Catholic University of America Press (2007)
- Lovely, like Jerusalem. The Fulfilment of the Old Testament in Christ and the Church (2007)
- Redeeming Beauty. Essays on Sacral Aesthetics (2007)
- Reason with Piety. Garrigou-Lagrange in the Service of Catholic Thought (2008)
- The Realm. An Unfashionable Essay on the Conversion of England (2008)
- G. K. Chesterton, Theologian (2009)
- From Hermes to Benedict XVI. Faith and Reason in Modern Catholic Thought (2009)
- Romance and System: The Theological Synthesis of Matthias Joseph Scheeben (Emmaus Academic, 2010) ISBN 9781645850588
- Criticising the Critics. Catholic Apologias for Today (2010)
- A Key to Balthasar: Hans Urs von Balthasar on Beauty, Goodness, and Truth (Baker Academic, 2011) ISBN 9780801039744
- The Poet as Believer: A Theological Study of Paul Claudel (Routledge Studies in Theology, Imagination and the Arts, 2011) ISBN 9781409426851
- Lost in Wonder: Essays on Liturgy and the Arts (Routledge, 2011) ISBN 9781032099248
- The Latin Clerk: The Life, Work, and Travels of Adrian Fortescue (Lutterworth Press, 2011) ISBN 9780718892746
- Chalice of God: A Systematic Theology in Outline (Liturgical Press, 2012) ISBN 9780814634318
- Figuring out the Church: Her Marks, and Her Masters (Ignatius Press, 2013) ISBN 9781586178185
- There Is No Rose: The Mariology of the Catholic Church (Fortress Press, 2015) ISBN 9781451484465
- All Great Art is Praise: Art and Religion in John Ruskin (Catholic University of America Press, 2016) ISBN 9780813228921
- Conciliar Octet: A Concise Commentary on the Eight Key Texts of the Second Vatican Council (Ignatius Press, 2019) ISBN 9781621642862
- Balthasar for Thomists (Ignatius Press, 2020) ISBN 9781621643395

== Book reviews ==
Year	Review article	Work(s) reviewed
2021	Nichols, Aidan (November 2021). "[Untitled review]". New Blackfriars. 102 (1102): 1029–1031. doi:10.1111/nbfr.12701. S2CID 244752340.	Kirwan, Jon (2018). An avant-garde theological generation : the nouvelle theologie and the French crisis of modernity. Oxford: Oxford University Press.
