= Mysterium Paschale =

1969 book by Hans Urs von Balthasar

- Author: Hans Urs von Balthasar
- Language: German
- Publication date: 1992
- ISBN: 9783894110314

Mysterium Paschale. The Mystery of Easter (German: Theologie der Drei Tage) is a 1969 book by the Swiss theologian and Catholic priest Hans Urs von Balthasar. The original German edition was published by Benziger Verlag, Einsiedeln. In 1983 it was reprinted by St. Benno-Verlag, Leipzig, including additions made to the second French edition Pâques le mystère, copyright 1981 by Les Edition du Cerf, Paris. The first English translation with an Introduction by Aidan Nichols, O.P., was published in 1990.

== Publication history ==
The book began as a monograph-sized article for the volume 3/2 of the dogmatic encyclopedia Mysterium Salutis (1965-1976), which was intended as a complete treatment of the mystery of salvation in Catholic theology. Balthasar wrote several sections, but he was not initially asked to author this one on the paschal mystery. The editors had commissioned the article from another collaborator, and when he refused because he was sick, Balthasar was called to replace him at short notice and had to write hastily. The article (197 pages in the original) was published almost simultaneously also in book form, with the title Theologie der drei Tage.

== Content ==
Mysterium Paschale offers an account of the death and resurrection of Christ, and their significance for the Christian life. Balthasar discusses the "bodiliness" of the Resurrection from the "radical" death of Jesus, involving his descent into the place of the dead on Holy Saturday. Balthasar's willingness to assume the nature and the consequence of his sin makes him, as well as the reader, extrapolate that God can endure and conquer godlessness, abandonment, and death. His exegesis emphasizes that Jesus was not betrayed but surrendered and delivered up by himself, since the meaning of the Greek word used by the New Testament, paradidonai (παραδιδόναι, Latin: tradere), is unequivocally "handing over of self". In the 1972 "Preface to the Second Edition", Balthasar takes a cue from Revelation 13:8 (Vulgate: agni qui occisus est ab origine mundi, NIV: "the Lamb who was slain from the creation of the world") to push the theology of the Cross from the immanent Trinity up to the economic One, so that "God is love" consists in an "eternal super-kenosis". In the words of Balthasar himself: "At this point, where the subject undergoing the 'hour' is the Son speaking with the Father, the controversial 'Theopaschist formula' has its proper place: 'One of the Trinity has suffered.' The formula can already be found in Gregory Nazianzen: 'We needed a...crucified God'." But while theopaschism indicates only a Christological kenosis (or kenotic Christology), instead Balthasar supports a Trinitarian kenosis: "The persons of the Trinity constitute themselves as who they are through the very act of pouring themselves out for each other." This allows to clearly distinguish his idea from Subordinationism.

== See also ==
- Judas Iscariot § Other
- Nemo contra Deum nisi Deus ipse
- Self-sabotage
- Trinity § Love
