= Gottfried-Keller-Preis =

Swiss literary award

The Gottfried-Keller-Preis, prix Gottfried-Keller, or premio Gottfried Keller is one of the oldest literary awards of Switzerland. The prize was created by Martin Bodmer and is named after the Swiss author Gottfried Keller. It is awarded every two to three years.

== Laureates ==
- 1922 Jakob Bosshart
- 1925 Heinrich Federer
- 1927 Charles Ferdinand Ramuz
- 1929 Josef Nadler
- 1931 Hans Carossa
- 1933 Festgabe Universität Zürich
- 1936 Hermann Hesse
- 1938 Ernst Gagliardi
- 1943 Robert Faesi
- 1947 Fritz Ernst
- 1949 Rudolf Kassner
- 1952 Gertrud von Le Fort
- 1954 Werner Kaegi
- 1956 Max Rychner
- 1959 Maurice Zermatten
- 1962 Emil Staiger
- 1965 Meinrad Inglin
- 1967 Edzard Schaper
- 1969 Golo Mann
- 1971 Marcel Raymond
- 1973 Ignazio Silone
- 1975 Hans Urs von Balthasar
- 1977 Elias Canetti
- 1979 Max Wehrli
- 1981 Philippe Jaccottet
- 1983 Hermann Lenz
- 1985 Herbert Lüthy
- 1989 Jacques Mercanton
- 1992 Erika Burkart
- 1994 Gerhard Meier
- 1997 Giovanni Orelli
- 1999 Peter Bichsel
- 2001 Agota Kristof
- 2004 Klaus Merz
- 2007 Fabio Pusterla
- 2010 Gerold Späth
- 2013 Collective of writers Bern ist überall
- 2016 Pietro De Marchi
- 2019 Thomas Hürlimann and Adolf Muschg
- 2022 Noëlle Revaz
- 2024 Fleur Jaeggy
