= Raymund Schwager =

The Reverend Raymund Schwager SJ
- Born: 11 November 1935; Balterswil, Switzerland
- Died: 27 February 2004 (aged 68); Innsbruck, Austria

Ecclesiastical career
- Religion: Christianity (Roman Catholic)
- Church: Latin Church
- Ordained: 1955

Academic background
- Education: University of Fribourg
- Influences: Hans Urs von Balthasar; René Girard

Academic work
- Discipline: Theology
- Institutions: University of Innsbruck

Raymund Schwager (1935–2004) was a Swiss Roman Catholic priest and theologian, and member of the Society of Jesus (Jesuits).

== Life ==
Schwager was born on 11 November 1935 in Balterswil into a Swiss farming family as the second of seven children. After primary and secondary school he joined the Society of Jesus (the Jesuits) in 1955. Following Jesuit custom, he studied philosophy (1957–1960 in Pullach near Munich, Germany) and theology (1963–1967 in Lyon-Fourvière, France), separated by educational work as a prefect in a Jesuit boarding school (1960–1963, "Stella Matutina" in Feldkrich, Austria).

Schwager was ordained a priest on 31 July 1966 and completed his formal education with a doctorate in theology (1967–1969 in Fribourg, Switzerland). During those years he also spent some time in Spain, the home country of the Jesuits' Basque founder, Ignatius of Loyola, on whom he wrote his thesis.

For seven years (1970–1977) Schwager was a member of the editors of the journal Orientierung in Zurich and travelled, giving speeches and presentations. In 1977 he became Professor of Dogmatic and Ecumenical Theology at the Faculty of Catholic Theology in Innsbruck, Austria. From 1985 to 1987, and again from 1999 to 2003, he was dean of that faculty. He was a co-founder of the Colloquium on Violence & Religion (1991), its first president (1991–1995) and an honorary member of its advisory board from 1999 until his unexpected death on 27 February 2004.

== Theology ==
Schwager's thinking was above all inspired by three sources: First, his deep Christian faith and spirituality in the tradition of Ignatius of Loyola and nourished by the biblical writings; second: a mode of arguing he called "dramatic", a term he took from Hans Urs von Balthasar but to which he gave new meaning in his theology; third: mimetic theory and the friendship he sustained with its author, René Girard.

In theology, Schwager took up controversial questions like sacrifice and substitution and relentlessly worked to clarify the way we are to conceive of God. By tackling questions that others tried to avoid, Schwager advanced theological thinking and facilitated solutions that previously had not been thought of. He reached these goals via his hallmark "Dramatic Theology": The history of revelation, as it has been recorded in the biblical writings, is not linear. Divine revelation, therefore, is not like a theoretical treatise. History is made up of a web of different interdependent actions – initiatives and responses – by different agents – human and divine. Thus we have to read the Bible like a drama that captures this dramatic back and forth, and each act in the drama of salvation gives new meaning to every cue-line and to the whole play. Only retrospectively can we infer what it is all about and come to a theory, yet a theory that remains always dependent on the whole drama and its acts; separated from it, it petrifies and loses validity.

Also inter-religious dialogue and symbolic actions for peace by world religious leaders ranked high on Schwager's list of important events. He especially valued Pope John Paul II's activities in this respect: his travels and encounters with other religious leaders, his prayer meetings in Assisi and his confession of guilt for the church on the First Sunday of Lent in 2000. Acknowledging the shortcomings of oneself and one’s own community without scapegoating others or the past of one’s own community is a prerequisite for true and lasting peace, Raymund Schwager was convinced.

== Writings ==
Among his numerous writings in books and articles Schwager’s most important works in English translation are:

- Must There Be Scapegoats? Violence and Redemption in the Bible. (German: Brauchen wir einen Sündenbock?) Transl. by M. L. Assad. Crossroad, New York, N. Y., 2000. ISBN 0-8245-1867-5
- Jesus of Nazareth: How He Understood His Life. New York: Crossroad Pub. Co, 1998. Trans. J. G. Williams. ISBN 0-8245-1711-3
- Jesus in the Drama of Salvation. Toward a Biblical Doctrine of Redemption. Trans. J. G. Williams & P. Haddon (Ger.: Jesus im Heilsdrama. Entwurf einer biblischen Erlösungslehre). New York: Crossroad 1999. ISBN 0-8245-1796-2
- Banished from Eden: Original Sin and Evolutionary Theory in the Drama of Salvation London: Gracewing, 2006. Trans. J. G. Williams. (Ger.: Erbsünde und Heilsdrama: Im Kontext von Evolution, Gentechnik und Apokalyptik. Münster: LIT Verlag, 1997.) ISBN 0-85244-606-3
