= Werner Kaegi =

Swiss historian

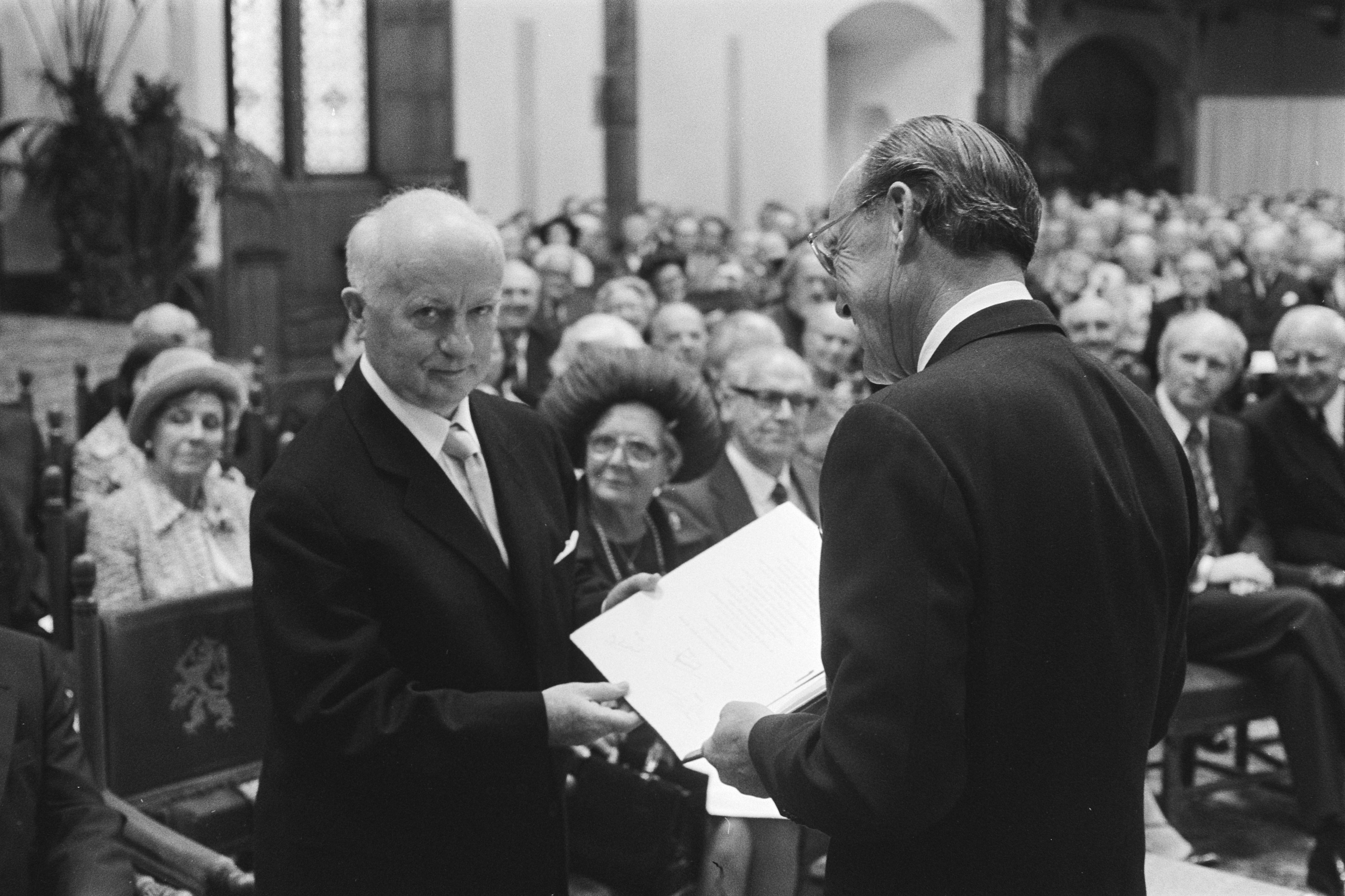
Kaegi (1977)

Werner Kaegi (February 22, 1901 – June 15, 1979) was a Swiss historian. He is best known for a single work, a biography of Jacob Burckhardt. This appeared in seven volumes, from 1947 to 1982.

He was the recipient of the Gottfried-Keller-Preis and the Erasmus Prize.

His wife was the Catholic mystic and stigmatist Adrienne von Speyr (1902–1967). Her spiritual director and friend, the theologian Hans Urs von Balthasar, kept a journal during many years about her life in which details regarding her relationship with Werner Kaegi can be found. This journal was later edited in 3 volumes under the name "Erde und himmel" ("Earth and heaven").

Kaegi became a foreign member of the Royal Netherlands Academy of Arts and Sciences in 1948 and a member of the American Philosophical Society in 1976.
