= Emil Staiger =

Professor of German Studies

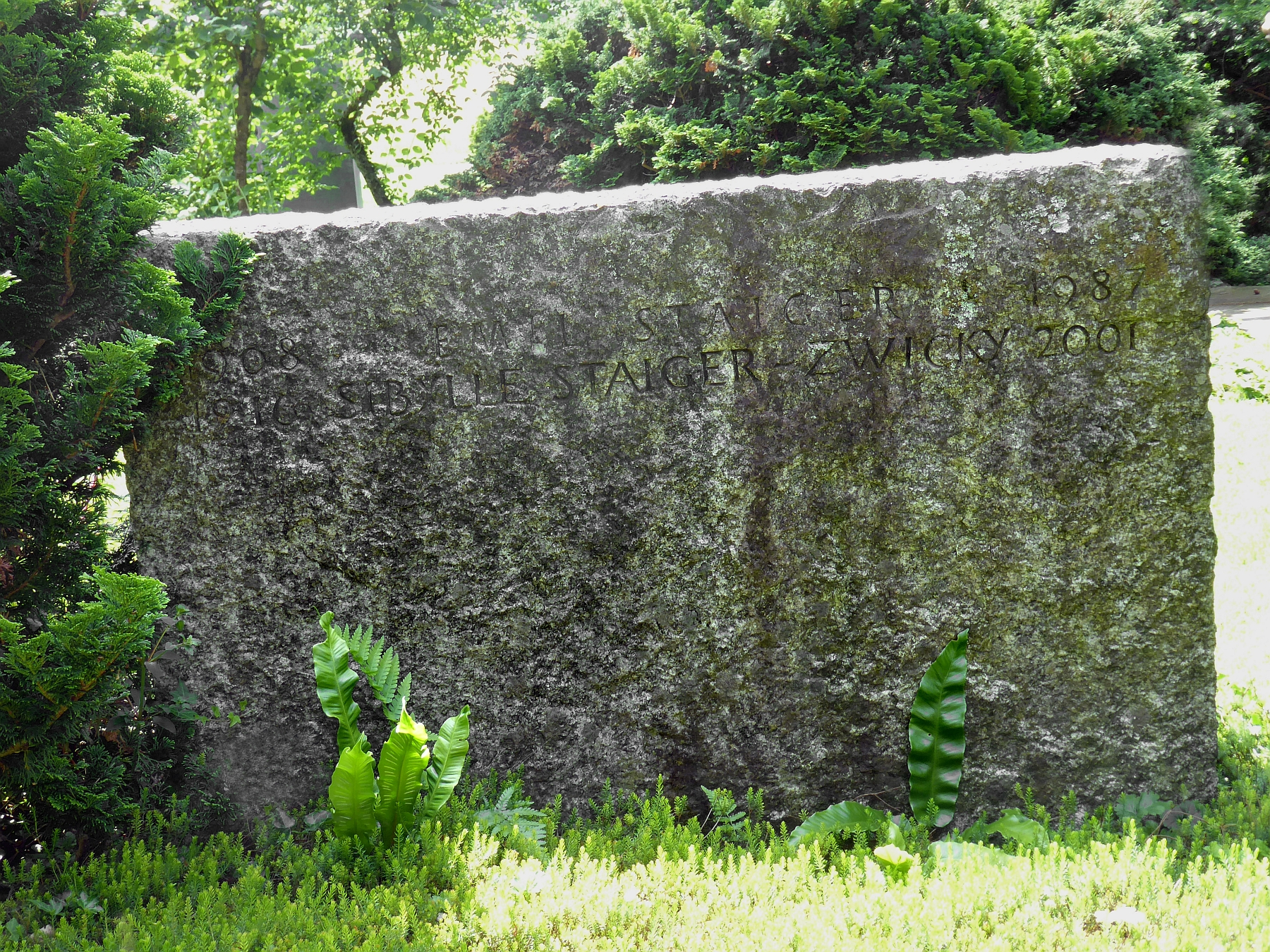
Grave of Emil Staiger at Witikon Cemetery in Zurich

Emil Staiger (8 February 1908 – 28 April 1987) was a Swiss historian, writer, Germanist and Professor of German Studies at the University of Zurich.

== Life ==
Staiger was born on 8 February 1908 in Kreuzlingen, Switzerland. After graduating from school, Emil Staiger first studied theology before switching to German and classical philology. After studying at the University of Geneva, the University of Zurich and the Ludwig-Maximilians-Universität München, he received his doctorate at the University of Zurich in 1932 with a thesis on Annette von Droste-Hülshoff. From 1932 to 1934, he was a member of the National Front (Switzerland), from which he publicly distanced himself in 1935. In 1934, he completed his time at the University of Zurich with a thesis on Schelling, Hegel and Hölderlin. That same year, he became a private lecturer in German literature at the University of Zurich. In 1943, he was appointed to a professorship. Staiger's importance in the field of German literature was founded in his widely acclaimed publications Die Zeit als Einbildkraft des Dichters (1939), Basic Concepts of Poetics (1946), The Art of Interpretation (1955) and in his three-volume Goethe Studies (1952–1959).

Staiger died on 28 April 1987 in Horgen, Switzerland.

=== Critical style ===
Staiger's style of literary criticism was opposed to extra-literary concepts such as positivism and intellectual history, sociology or psychoanalysis. For Staiger, concentration on the literary texts themselves was most important. He wrote that “the poet's word, the word for its own sake, is valid, nothing behind it, about or below it". This sensitive interpretation method, often described with the saying “understand what grabs us”, developed into a distinct Germanic style of studying literature. His work, The Art of Interpretation describes his method of literary criticism.

=== Influence ===
Staiger's 11 o'clock lectures, which inspired students from all over Europe as well as the literary public to attend, were spoken about far beyond the University of Zurich. At the same time Staiger was a renowned translator of ancient and modern languages, and translated Aeschylus, Sophocles, Euripides, Virgil, Tasso, Poliziano and Milton into German. As a controversial theater and music critic as well as a columnist, he influenced Zurich's cultural life for decades. He wrote a column for the Neue Zürcher Zeitung, a Swiss German-language newspaper.

== Prizes ==
- Gottfried-Keller Prize, 1962
- Nominated for the Nobel Prize in Literature, 1964
- Sigmund Freud Prize for scientific prose, 1966
- Zurich Literature Prize, 1966
- Pour le Mérite for science and the arts, 1966
- Corresponding member of the British Academy, 1971
- Austrian Decoration of Honor for Science and Art, 1975
