= Paul VI Prize =

Paul VI International Prize (Italian: Premio Internazionale Paolo VI) is a prize founded in 1979 by the Paul VI Institute in Brescia, Italy, named in honour of Pope Paul VI. The prize is awarded to individuals or institutions "who, with their studies and their works, have contributed to the growth of the religious meaning in the world."

== Recipients ==
- 1983: Hans Urs von Balthasar
- 1988: Olivier Messiaen
- 1993: Oscar Cullmann
- 1997: Jean Vanier
- 2003: Paul Ricœur
- 2008: Editors of Sources Chrétiennes
- 2013: Joseph Coutts
- 2023: Sergio Mattarella

== See also ==
- List of ecclesiastical decorations
