= Gustav Siewerth =

German philosopher and Thomist (1903–1963)

- Born: 28 May 1903; Hofgeismar, Province of Hesse-Nassau, German Empire
- Died: 5 October 1963 (aged 60); Trento, Trentino-Alto Adige, Italy

Education
- Education: University of Frankfurt; University of Freiburg

Philosophical work
- Era: 20th-century philosophy
- Region: Western philosophy
- School: Thomism Christian metaphysics
- Main interests: Metaphysics; Epistemology; Philosophy of education; Philosophy of language

Gustav Siewerth (28 May 1903, Hofgeismar, Germany – 5 October 1963, Trento, Italy) was a German philosopher and educator. He is known for his original synthesis of Thomistic metaphysics with the thought of Martin Heidegger and G. W. F. Hegel, centered on a creative interpretation of the ontological difference and being as the "likeness" (Gleichnis) of God. Siewerth's work influenced theologians such as Hans Urs von Balthasar and remains a distinctive voice in 20th-century Catholic philosophy.

== Biography ==
After graduating from the Lessing-Gymnasium in Frankfurt in 1922, Siewerth studied philosophy and psychology at the University of Frankfurt. In 1924, he completed his Philosophicum at the Fulda Theological Seminary. From 1926 to 1930, he studied philosophy, art history, and history at the University of Freiburg under Martin Honecker, Martin Heidegger, and Edmund Husserl. His fellow students under Honecker included Max Müller, Eugen Seiterich, and Karl Rahner. In 1930, he earned his doctorate in Freiburg with a dissertation titled The Metaphysics of Knowledge according to Thomas Aquinas.

Following a research commission from the German Research Foundation regarding "The Concept of God in the Development of the Young Hegel," Siewerth was granted admission to seek his Habilitation at the University of Frankfurt in 1932. However, in 1933, both his Habilitation and a professorship at the Lyceum Hosianum in Braunsberg were blocked due to the political climate.

Siewerth completed his Habilitation in 1937 at the University of Freiburg with the thesis The Apriority of Knowledge as the Unifying Basis of Philosophical Systematics according to Thomas Aquinas. According to his student Jan Bentz, the work was accepted despite opposition from Heidegger, who reportedly believed the thesis belonged more to theology than to philosophy. Nevertheless, Siewerth was denied a teaching post and barred from editorial positions. During the Third Reich, he spent his "inner emigration" working in industry for the Drahtverband and the Mannesmann Tube Works in Düsseldorf.

In 1945 Siewerth was appointed Professor of Philosophy and Pedagogy and Director at the Rhineland College of Education (Aachen Division). In 1961, he became the founding Rector and Professor of Pedagogy at the Freiburg University of Education. Siewerth died on October 5, 1963, during a conference of the Görres Society in Trento; he is interred at the Bergäcker Cemetery in Freiburg-Littenweiler.

== Philosophical work ==
=== The ontological difference ===
Siewerth attempts to locate the origin of the ontological difference within medieval philosophy of being, especially Thomas Aquinas. Unlike Heidegger's focus on the "forgetfulness of being" (Seinsvergessenheit) in Western metaphysics, Siewerth argues that Aquinas already grasped the difference, albeit in a form obscured by later Scotist and Suárezian scholasticism.

For Siewerth, difference always originates in unity. Unity is more primordial than difference; difference is the "twofoldedness or more-foldedness of the one, the non-identity of identity and the otherness of selfness." Applied to being, this means that Being (as primary act) and essence (as the "other" of being) are distinct but originate from a single source. Siewerth locates this source in the ens commune – non-subsistent actuality – which mirrors subsistent being itself (esse in se subsistens).

=== Non‑subsistent being and the critique of rationalism ===
A central and distinctive doctrine in Siewerth is his account of "non‑subsistent being." As he develops in Die Abstraktion und das Sein nach der Lehre des Thomas von Aquin (Abstraction and Being in the Doctrine of Thomas Aquinas), Siewerth argues that rationalism and nominalist scholasticism reduced being to a univocal, formal concept – an "abstraction of abstraction." Against this, he insists that being as act (actus essendi) is simple, unlimited, and perfect, yet it does not subsist in itself. Non‑subsistence is not a defect but the very condition for being to be the first effect of God and the genuine likeness (Gleichnis) of the divine ground.

   "If being were a subsistent reality, it would be a being of beings; if it were merely logical, it would be a merely conceptual common being (ens rationis). Being itself (esse) is something simple and perfect, but it does not subsist; it is a mere outflow from God, an emanation."[6]

For Siewerth, the distinction between act and subsistence is even more foundational than the classic 'real distinction' between essence and existence. Pure act (actus purus) as such is not yet the image of God; being (esse) only becomes a true likeness of the divine ground when it reaches subsistence (subsistentia) through essence. This occurs paradigmatically in the rational spirit (man), where being "returns to itself" in knowledge and love, achieving personal subsistence. The process of becoming‑subsistent is what constitutes a being as real.

Thus, Siewerth reinterprets the Thomistic imago Dei not merely theologically but ontologically. Man is the image of God precisely because in human reason, being as act comes to subsistence, reflecting the Trinitarian structure of difference‑in‑unity. "If being were not differentiated and remained pure act and being‑in‑itself, it would not mirror the Christian God but rather a counter‑image (Widerbild) – the all‑transcendent One of Plotinus or the inaccessible Allah of the Muslims."

Furthermore, Siewerth insists that the theory of knowledge is itself a form of metaphysics: the act of judgment (conceptio entis) grasps being in its concrete reality, rather than operating with abstract concepts. Understanding being is not a matter of possessing a prior concept (conceptus entis) but of engaging in a dynamic act of conception (conceptio entis) that reveals being in its differentiated, subsistent structure.

=== Aquinas and the forgetfulness of being ===
Unlike Heidegger, who saw Thomas Aquinas as a key figure in the "forgetfulness of being" (Seinsvergessenheit), Siewerth defended Aquinas as a thinker who still genuinely "thought being" in its original structure. According to Siewerth, Aquinas did not create a "system" in the modern sense but practiced a "summary" (summary) mode of thinking, in which the fullness of Being is present, though often implicitly. Aquinas's great achievement, for Siewerth, lay in his strict differentiation between a being (ens) and that from which it is constituted (esse). Consequently, Heidegger's critique of metaphysics does not apply to Aquinas himself but to later Scholasticism (particularly Duns Scotus and Francisco Suárez), which, in Siewerth's view, distorted his legacy.

=== German Idealism and Hegel ===
Siewerth was substantially indebted to G. W. F. Hegel and used Hegelian dialectics to develop Thomism. He adapted Hegel's concept of the "identity of identity and non-identity" but placed it within the framework of "exemplary identity" between God and creation. However, Siewerth sharply rejected Hegel's pantheistic and emanationist conclusions. He argued that Hegel's understanding of contradiction as a constitutive principle of being, and his identification of God with a process of self-knowledge through otherness, represented the apex of "gnosis" in Western thought, leading directly to the "forgetfulness of being." Siewerth's own doctrine of being as a "likeness" (Gleichnis), rather than an emanation, was intended to overcome Hegelian dialectics.

Siewerth's thought has been described as "transcendental theism" – an attempt to think being as mediation and image of the divine ground while preserving the absolute transcendence of God. His work influenced Hans Urs von Balthasar, who called him "one of the most universal thinkers of our time."

Critical voices have noted that Siewerth's distinction between created and uncreated being risks blurring the line between God and creature, especially when he speaks of being as an "emanation" or "flow" from God. Defenders reply that his doctrine of non-subsistence safeguards divine transcendence, because created being never subsists on its own but only in and through essence.

== Selected bibliography ==
The Gustav Siewerth Society (Gustav-Siewerth-Gesellschaft) continues to publish his collected works and promote research on his philosophy.

A complete bibliography is available at .

- Die Metaphysik der Erkenntnis nach Thomas von Aquin. Vol. 1: Die sinnliche Erkenntnis. Oldenbourg, Munich 1933 (= Doctoral thesis, University of Freiburg) (later: Reihe Libelli, Vol. 173, Wissenschaftliche Buchgesellschaft, Darmstadt 1968).
- Der Thomismus als Identitätssystem. Schulte-Bulmke, Frankfurt am Main 1939 (2nd ed. 1961).
- Die Apriorität der menschlichen Erkenntnis nach Thomas von Aquin. In: Symposion, Vol. 1 (1949), pp. 95–167 (= Habilitation thesis, University of Freiburg).
- Wagnis und Bewahrung. Zur metaphysischen Begründung des erzieherischen Auftrages. Schwann, Düsseldorf 1958 (2nd ed. 1964).
- Das Schicksal der Metaphysik von Thomas zu Heidegger (= Sammlung Horizonte, Vol. 6). Johannes Verlag, Einsiedeln 1959 (New edition: Johannes, Freiburg im Breisgau 2003, ISBN 3-89411-382-0).
- Philosophie der Sprache (= Sammlung Horizonte, Vol. 9). Johannes Verlag, Einsiedeln 1962.
- Metaphysik der Kindheit (= Sammlung Horizonte, Vol. 3). 2nd ed. Johannes Verlag, Einsiedeln 1962.
- Grundfragen der Philosophie im Horizont der Seinsdifferenz. Gesammelte Aufsätze zur Philosophie. Schwann, Düsseldorf 1963.
- Hinführung zur exemplarischen Lehre. Aufsätze und Beispiele. Herder, Freiburg im Breisgau 1965.
- Gesammelte Werke (Vol. 1 – Vol. 6 c). Patmos-Verlag, Düsseldorf/Verlag Gustav Siewerth-Gesellschaft, Konstanz 1971–2018.

== See also ==
Gustav Siewerth Academy
