= Aidan Nichols =

English academic and Catholic priest (born 1948)

The Very Reverend Aidan Nichols OP
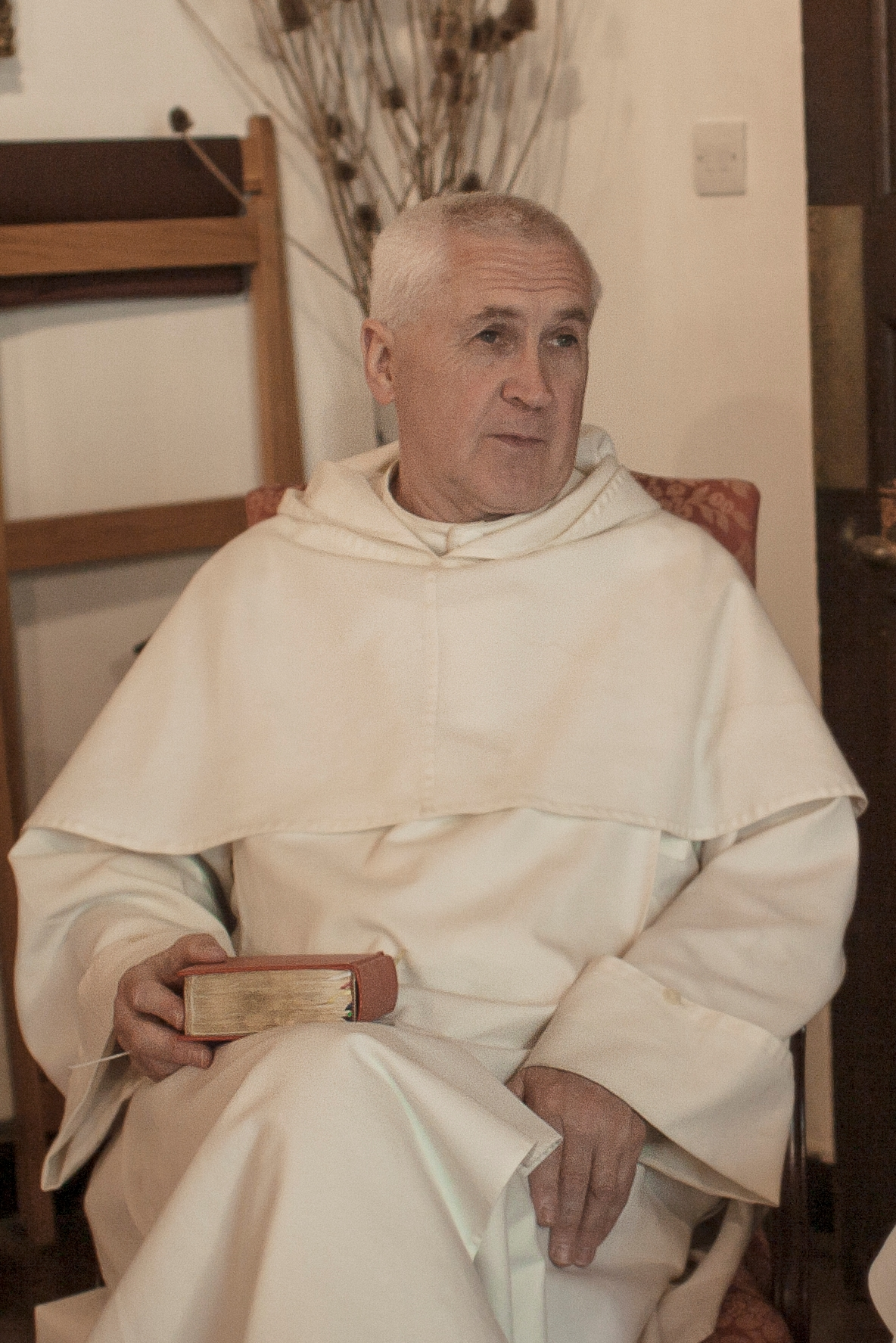
- Nichols in 2014

Orders
- Ordination: 7 July 1976

Personal details
- Born: 17 September 1948 (age 78) Lytham St Annes, Lancashire, England
- Denomination: Catholic (Latin Church)
- Residence: Priory of St Dominic, London
- Occupation: Priest, academic, theologian
- Education: Christ Church, Oxford; Blackfriars, Oxford; University of Edinburgh; Pontifical University of Saint Thomas Aquinas

John Christopher "Aidan" Nichols OP (born 17 September 1948) is an English Catholic academic and Dominican priest. He served as the first John Paul II Memorial Visiting Lecturer at the University of Oxford from 2006 to 2008, the first lectureship of Catholic theology there since the Protestant Reformation.

== Early life ==
Nichols was born in Lytham St Annes, Lancashire, on 17 September 1948. He graduated with first-class honours from Christ Church, Oxford, with a degree in modern history.

== Religious life ==
Nichols entered the Dominican Order in 1970. He spent the next seven years at Blackfriars, Oxford, during which time he was ordained to the priesthood. He then moved to Edinburgh, where he served as a chaplain at the University of Edinburgh. He received his doctorate at Edinburgh in 1986. Between 1983 and 1991, Nichols was lecturer in dogmatics and ecumenics at the Pontifical University of St. Thomas Aquinas in Rome. In 1990 he was awarded the degree of Licentiate of Sacred Theology from the university. In 2003, the master of the Dominican Order conferred on Nichols the degree of Master of Sacred Theology.

From Rome, Nichols moved back to England and to Cambridge, where he began as assistant Catholic chaplain, then as an affiliated university lecturer (1998) as prior of St Michael's for two terms between 1998 and 2004, and again for a third term from 2013.

Since finishing his third term as prior of Cambridge Nichols has lived in California at St. Michael's Abbey and now lives in the Dominican Priory in London.

== Academic work ==
Nichols began his academic work in the Russian theological tradition and has written on many figures, including Sergei Bulgakov. However he is best known for his work on Hans Urs von Balthasar, publishing three analytic volumes on von Balthasar's famous trilogy: The Word Has Been Abroad: A Guide Through Balthasar's Aesthetics (1998), No Bloodless Myth: A Guide Through Balthasar’s Dramatics (2000) and Say It Is Pentecost: A Guide Through Balthasar’s Logic (2001). He was also one of the contributors to the Cambridge Companion to Hans Urs von Balthasar (2004). He has also written The Theology of Joseph Ratzinger (1988), a book on the theological history of Anglicanism in The Panther and the Hind (1992) and a more general work on religion in the modern world, Christendom Awake (1993).

In the 2010s, Nichols suggested to review Roman Catholic Canon Law in order to deal with the problem of errant or wayward popes.

== Selected publications ==
- The Theology of Joseph Ratzinger: An Introductory Study (1988)
- Yves Congar (1989)
- The Holy Eucharist: From the New Testament to Pope John Paul II (1991)
- The Shape of Catholic Theology: An Introduction to Its Sources, Principles, and History (1991)
- The Panther and the Hind: A Theological History of Anglicanism (1992)
- Discovering Aquinas: An Introduction to His Life, Work and Influence (2002)
- Epiphany: A Theological Introduction to Catholicism (2002)
- Lovely, like Jerusalem. The Fulfilment of the Old Testament in Christ and the Church (2007)
- G. K. Chesterton, Theologian (2009)
- Chalice of God. A Systematic Theology in Outline (2012)
- There Is No Rose: The Mariology of the Catholic Church (2015)
- All Great Art is Praise: Art and Religion in John Ruskin (2016)
- Mystical Theologian: The Work of Vladimir Lossky (2017) ISBN 9780852449042
- Balthasar for Thomists (2020)
- Romance and System: The Theological Synthesis of Matthias Joseph Scheeben (2021)
- Apologia: A Memoir (2023)
