= Reinhold Schneider =

German poet

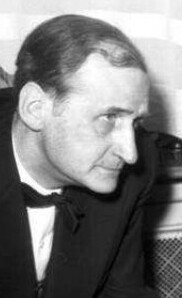
- Born: 13 May 1903; Baden-Baden (German Empire)
- Died: 6 April 1958; Freiburg im Breisgau (West Germany)
- Occupations: Writer, playwright
- Awards: Friedenspreis des Deutschen Buchhandels (Werner Bergengruen, 1956)

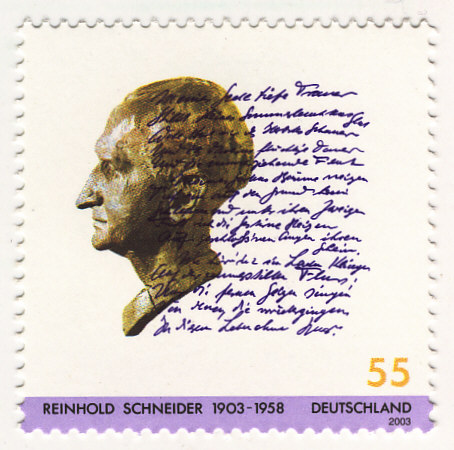
Reinhold Schneider on a stamp

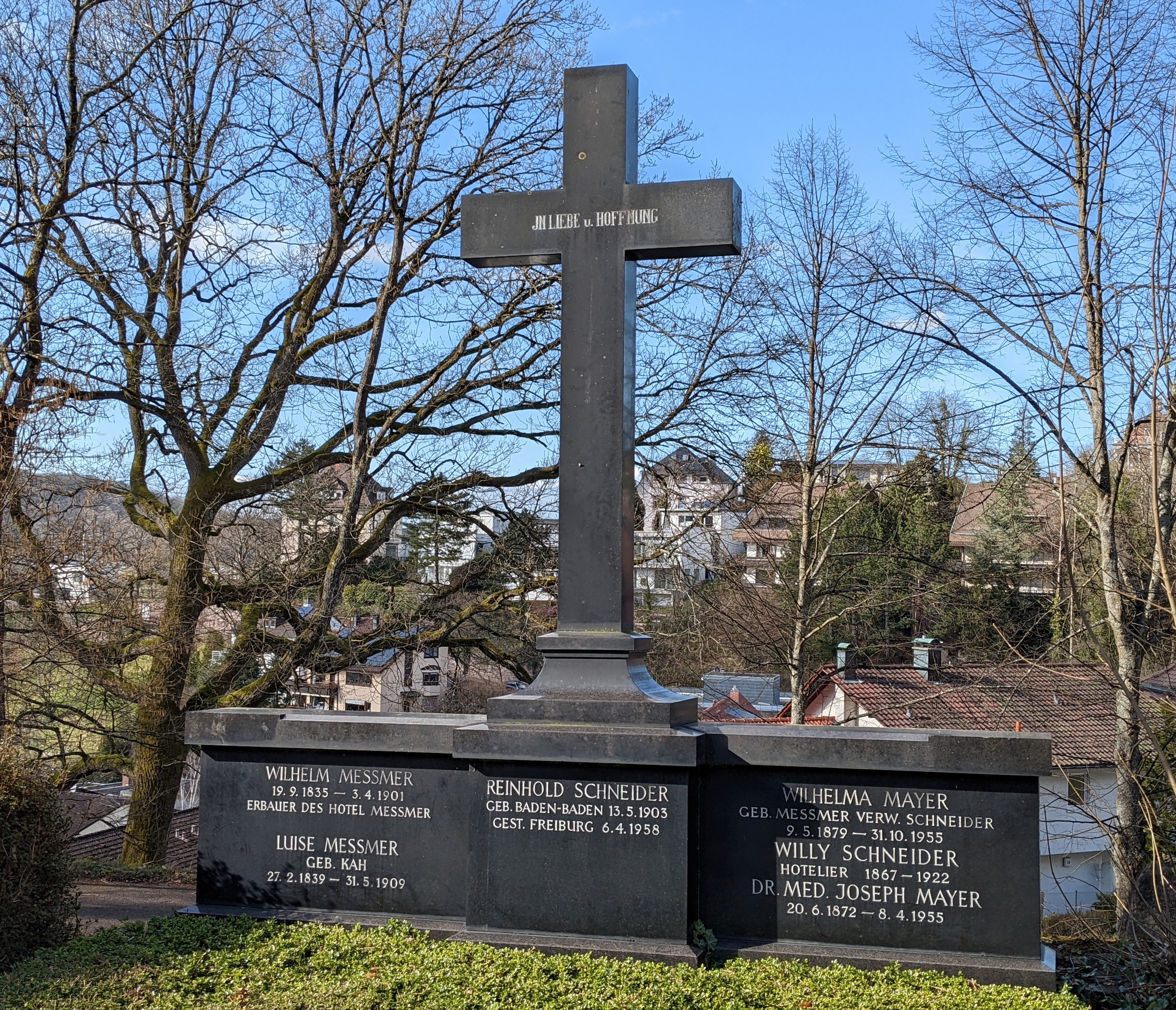
Grave in the main cemetery of Baden-Baden

Reinhold Schneider (Baden-Baden, May 13, 1903 – Freiburg im Breisgau, April 6, 1958) was a German poet who also wrote novels. Initially his works were less religious, but later his poetry had a Christian and specifically Catholic influence. His first works included ones about Luís de Camões and Portugal.

He had written anti-war poems, which were banned in Nazi Germany. Las Casas (1938) had analysed the ways Christians should respond to state oppression, and had criticised Nazi persecution and anti-Semitism; this led to the ban on publishing his works.

During the war associates of Schneider were in the 'Kreisau Circle' and the 'Freiburger Konzil' which had links with anti-Nazi resistance. His works were still published in Karl Ludwig Freiherr von und zu Guttenbergs journal White Papers and "underground", and tracts were distributed to soldiers at the front. Though he was accused of treason by authoring defeatist literature, the war ended before he could be tried.

== Works ==
- Apokalypse (1946): an anthology of sonnets.
- Begegnung und Bekenntnis. Literarische Essays (1963)
- Briefe an einen Freund. Mit Erinnerungen von Otto Heuschele
- Briefwechsel/Reinhold Schneider, Leopold Zeigler (1960)
- Das Inselreich (1936)
- Das Leiden des Camões (1930)
- Der große Verzicht (1950): drama.
- Die Hohenzollern. Tragik und Königtum (1933)
- Die Tarnkappe (1951): drama.
- Innozenz und Franziskus (1952): drama.
- Las Casas vor Karl V. (1938)
- Pfeiler im Strom (1958)
- Philipp der Zweite (1931)
- Tagebuch: 1930-1935
- Über Dichter und Dichtung (1953)
- Verhüllter Tag, Bekenntnis eines Lebens (1954)
- Verpflichtung und Liebe (1964)
- Winter in Wien (1958): a diary account of Schneider's stay in Vienna during 1957.

== Awards ==
- Peace Prize of the German Book Trade (1956)
- Pour le Mérite (Friedensklasse) (1952)
- Honorary doctorates bestowed by the University of Freiburg and the University of Münster (1946/47)
- Droste-Preis (1948)
- Longfellow-Preis (1948)
