= Germanisches Nationalmuseum =

Museum in Nuremberg, Germany

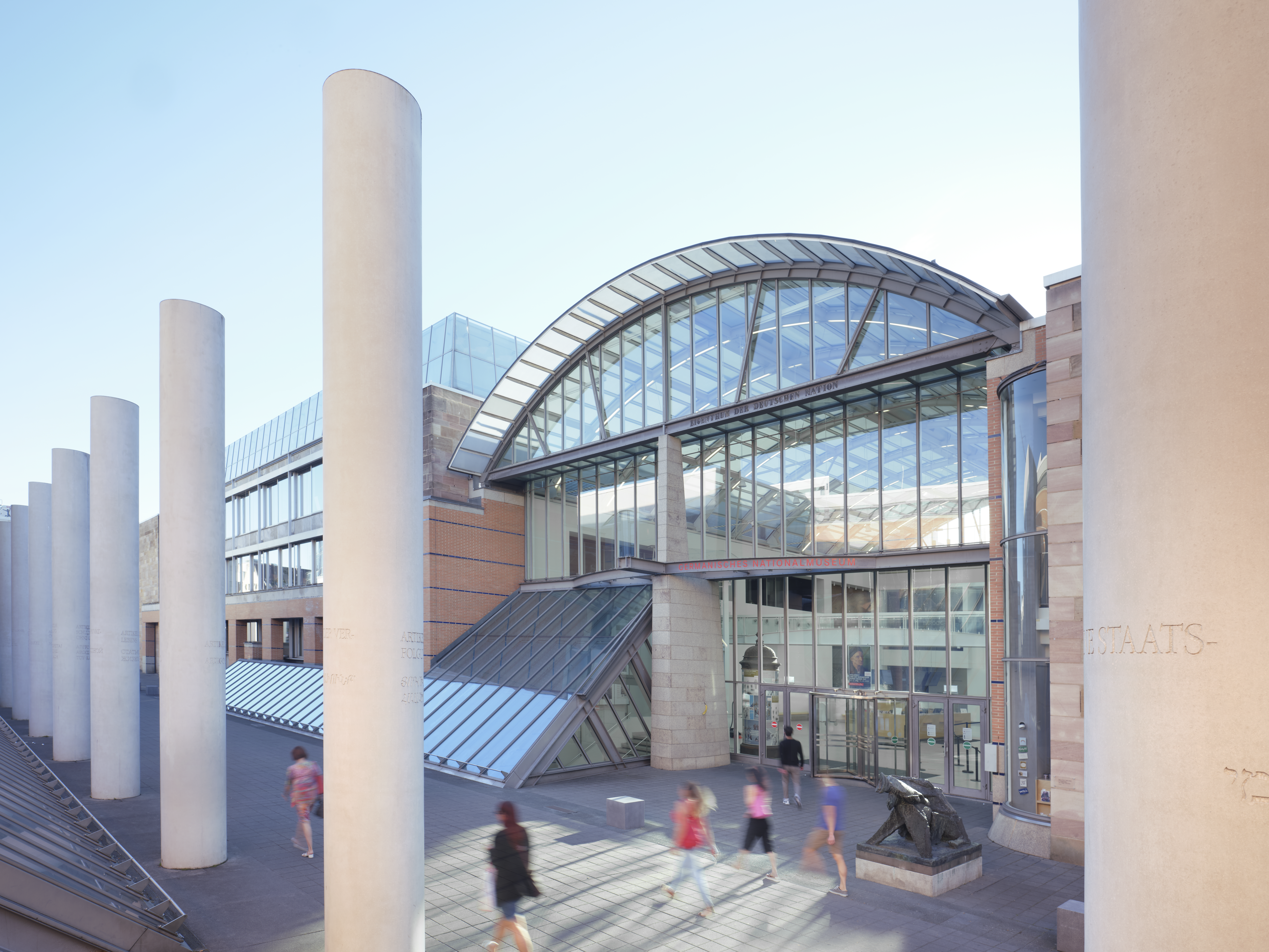
- Main entrance
- Established: 1852
- Location: Nuremberg, Germany
- Coordinates: 49°26′54″N 11°04′32″E
- Visitors: 405,799 (2010)
- Director: Daniel Hess
- Public transit access: U2/U3: Opernhaus; U1: Lorenzkirche
- Website: www.gnm.de

The Germanisches Nationalmuseum is a museum in Nuremberg, Germany. Founded in 1852, it houses a large collection of items relating to German culture and art extending from prehistoric times through to the present day. The museum is Germany's largest museum of cultural history. Out of its total holding of some 1.3 million objects (including the holdings of the library and the Department of Prints and Drawings), approximately 25,000 are exhibited.

The museum is situated in the south of the historic city center between Kornmarkt and Frauentormauer along the medieval city wall. Its entrance hall is situated on Kartäusergasse which was transformed by the Israeli sculptor Dani Karavan to the Way of Human Rights (German: Straße der Menschenrechte).

== Name, establishment, guiding principles ==
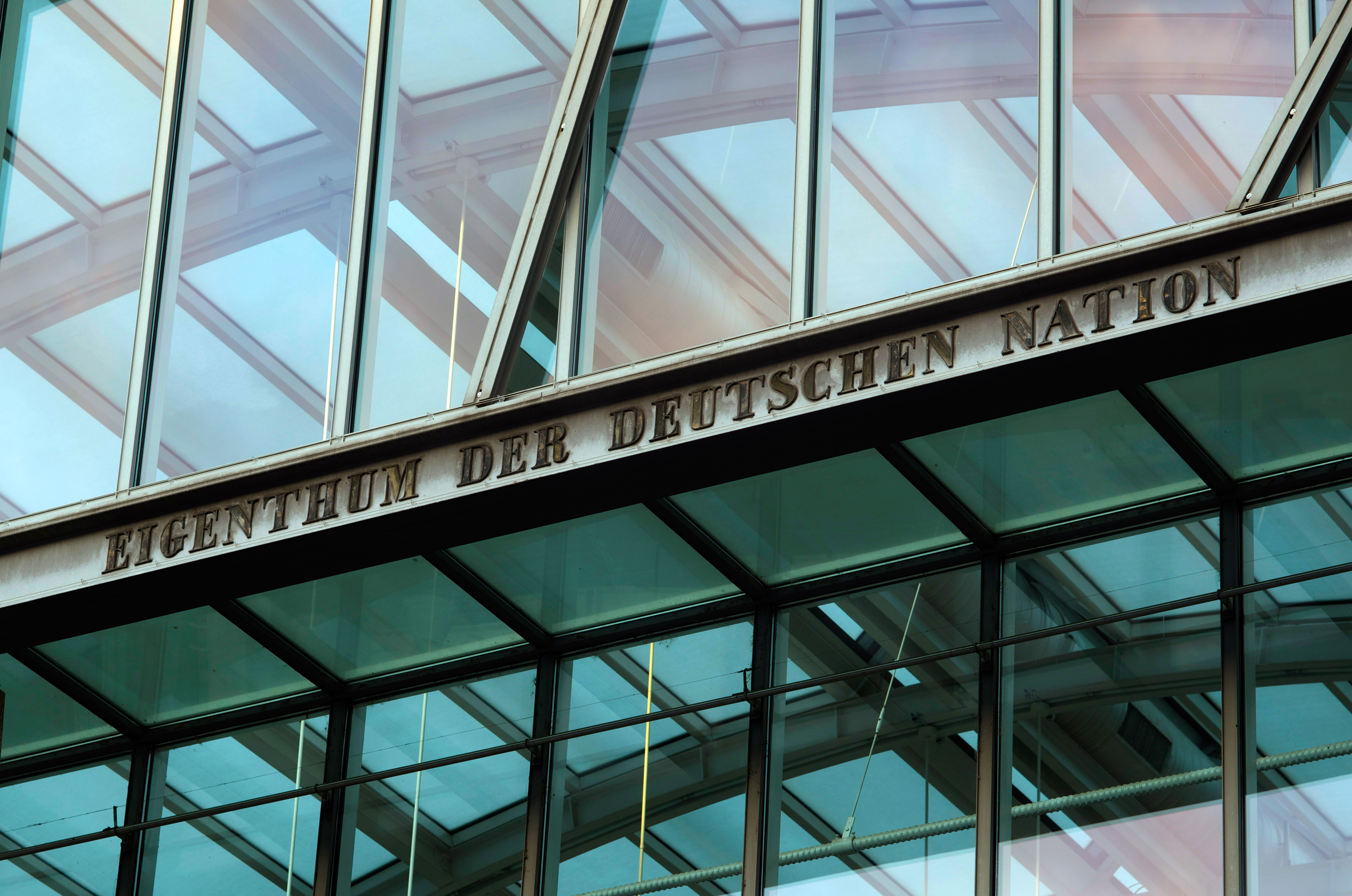
The inscription "EIGENTHUM DER DEUTSCHEN NATION" ("Property of the German Nation") at the main entrance was installed when the museum was founded in 1852, and was commissioned by Hans von und zu Aufseß

The Germanisches Museum, as it was named initially, was founded by a group of individuals led by the Franconian baron Hans von und zu Aufsess, whose goal was to assemble a "well-ordered compendium of all available source material for German history, literature and art".

The term 'Germanic' should be understood in the historical context of the mid nineteenth century. In 1846, German linguists and historians, amongst them the Brothers Grimm, Leopold Ranke and Jacob Burckhardt, had met in Frankfurt, and decided to use "Germanistik" as a comprehensive term embracing all the fields of their academic disciplines related to the culture of German-speaking regions. The German revolutions of 1848–49 had failed to achieve a liberalised and unified Germany. Thus the name of the museum maintained the idea of a close cultural relationship within a region defined by the common German language, and a shared German cultural tradition. In 1852, the museum's intention to document the cultural unity of the German-speaking areas was a progressive concept, free from any exaggerated chauvinism. Only in 1871, when the German Empire was constituted, the museum paid tribute to it by adding national to its name.

The museum understands itself as an important research and educational institution. As a national museum and a museum of the entire German-speaking region the German National Museum collects and maintains cultural, artistic and historical testimonials from the beginning of history to the present. As a research and educational institution of international standing, the collections, exhibitions and publications present the cultural history of the German-speaking countries in an international and interdisciplinary approach. The work of the institution is guided by the principle of respect for all cultures, so that all human beings can understand what the museum communicates, independent of their upbringing, education, and religious beliefs.

== Buildings ==
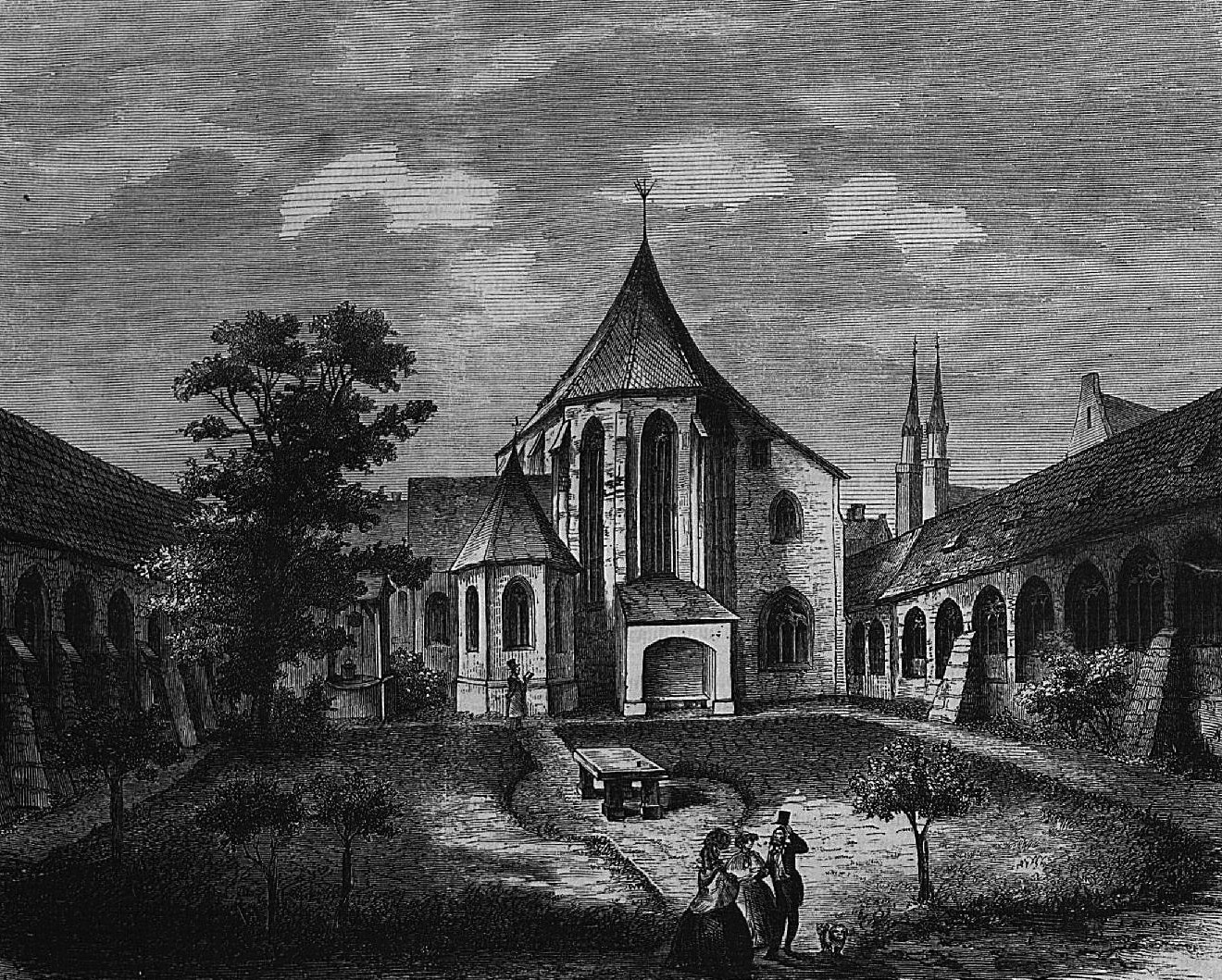
Courtyard of the Carthusian cloister at the time of the foundation of the GNM, 1852

The museum constitutes an architectural monument in itself, as it consists of a variety of buildings erected in different periods. It incorporates the remaining structures of the former Nuremberg Charterhouse (German: Kartäuserkloster), dissolved in 1525 and thereafter used for a variety of secular purposes until in 1857 what was left of these premises, by then badly dilapidated, was given to the museum. The charterhouse was rebuilt and modified to accommodate the collections until the late nineteenth century when Neo-Gothic extensions were added on its south side. During and after the First World War, the "Alter Eingang" (Old Entrance) and the "Galeriebau" (Gallery building) designed by German Bestelmeyer were built to provide an entrance from Kornmarkt and further space.

After the destructions during the Second World War, Sep Ruf designed additional buildings; historical parts of the halls and galleries were adapted to the new architectural concept or torn down after their destruction during the war; only some buildings were restored and rebuilt. The first major building was added 1955–1958, called "Heussbau" after the first president of West Germany, Theodor Heuss. In 1983, and from 1988 to 1993, the museum was substantially enlarged. The "Kartäuserbau" with the new entrance hall situated now on Kartäusergasse was designed by Jan Störmer of architects ME DI UM. In 1999, the 1910 building of the St Lorenz's parish children's home was acquired. It was restored in 2002, and is now the home for the Collection of Children's Toys.

== Collection ==
The collection is displayed in the following sections (denominated here as by the GNM):

- History of the GNM
- Prehistory and Ancient History
- Middle Ages
- Late Middle Ages
- Everyday Culture up to 1700
- Arms and Armour, Hunting, Garden Culture
- Musical Instruments
- Museum of Applied Arts
- Renaissance, Baroque Enlightenment
- Scientific Instruments
- Medicine and Crafts
- Decorative Arts before 1800
- Fashion and Clothing since 1700
- Folk Art
- 19th Century
- 20th Century
- Toys

In the section History of the GNM, the painting Germania is displayed which was exhibited in St. Paul's Church, Frankfurt am Main in 1848.

Some random examples of the collection are shown here:

== Gallery ==
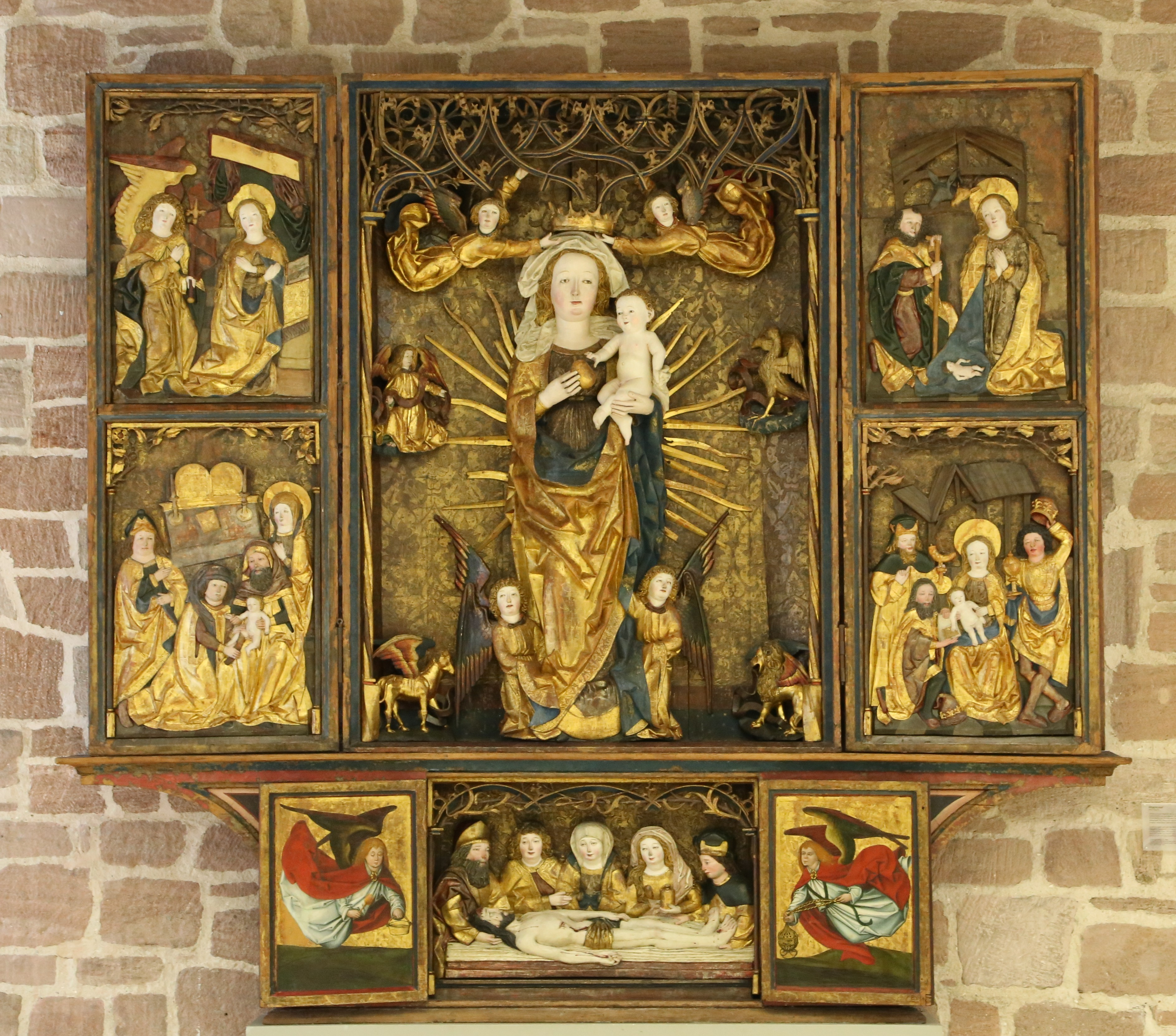
Altarpiece, c. 1500

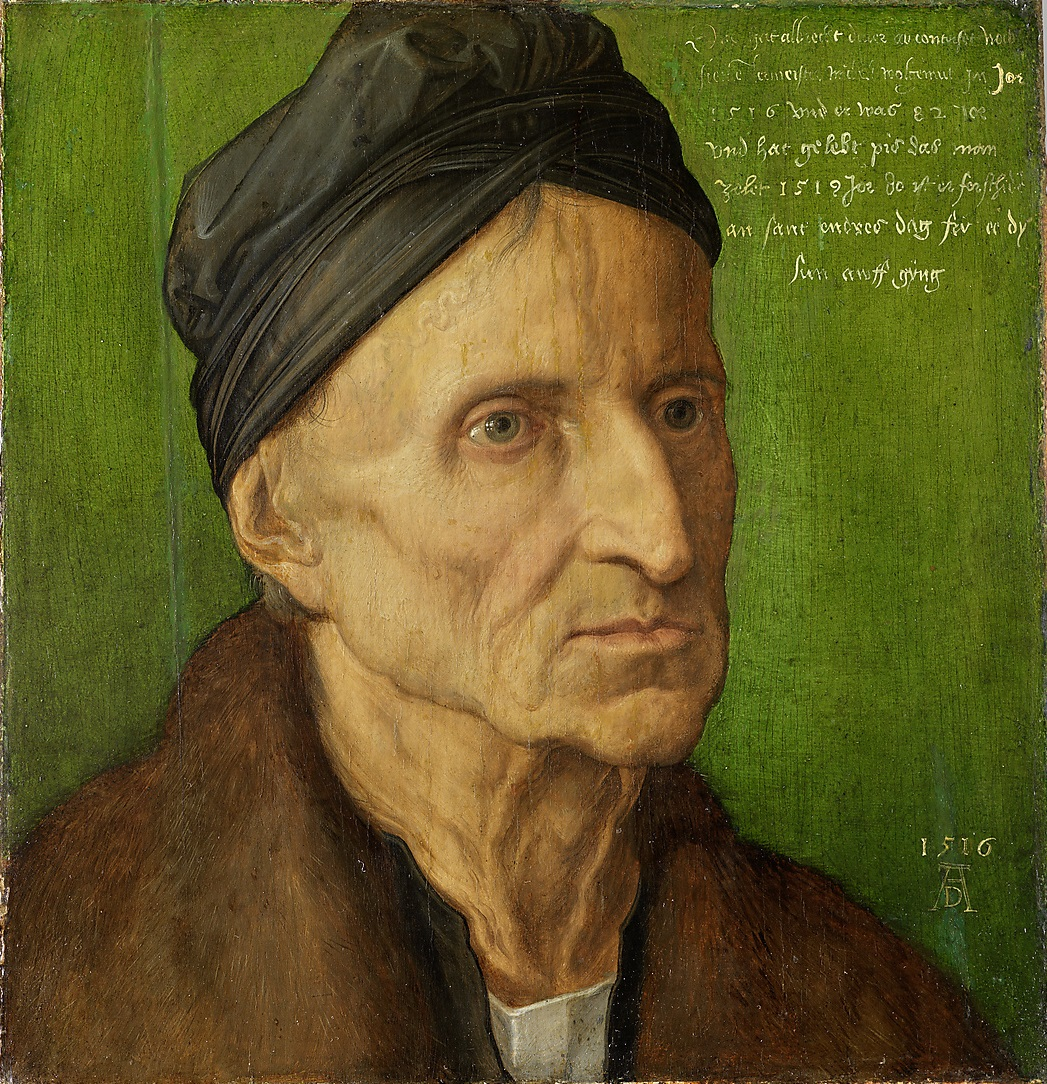
Michael Wolgemut, by Albrecht Dürer, 1516

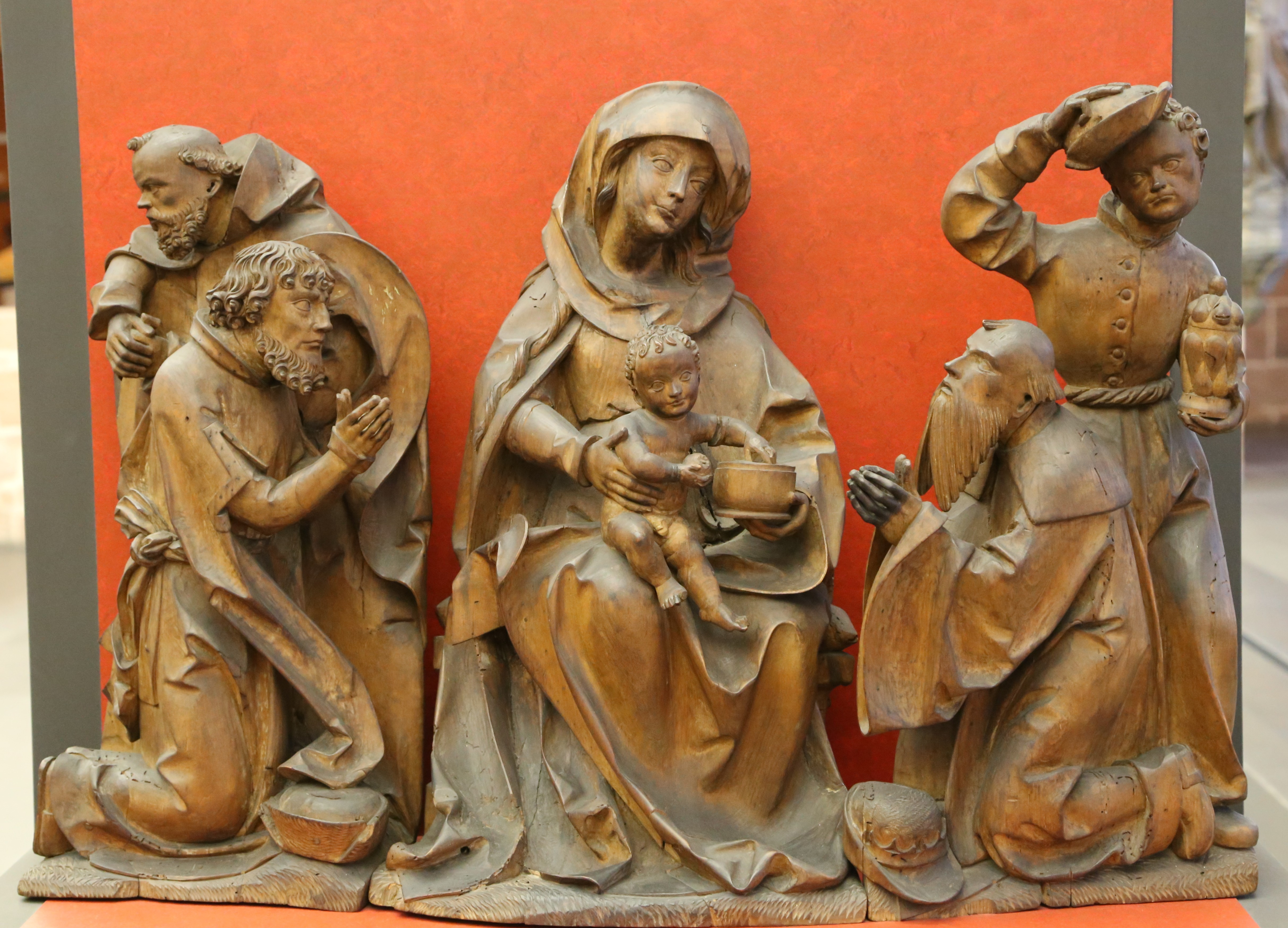
Adoration of the Magi, c. 1520

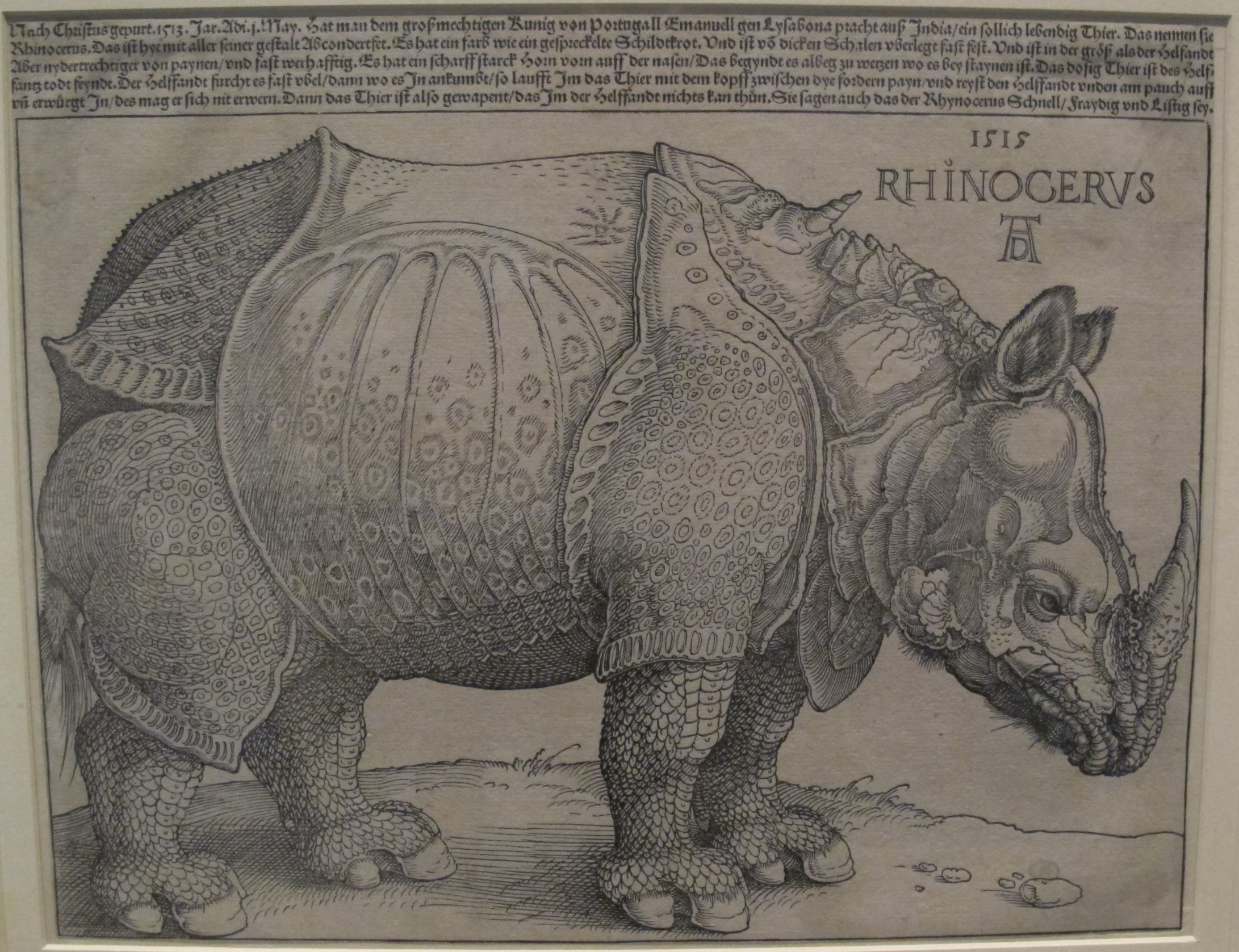
Dürer's Rhinoceros, 1515

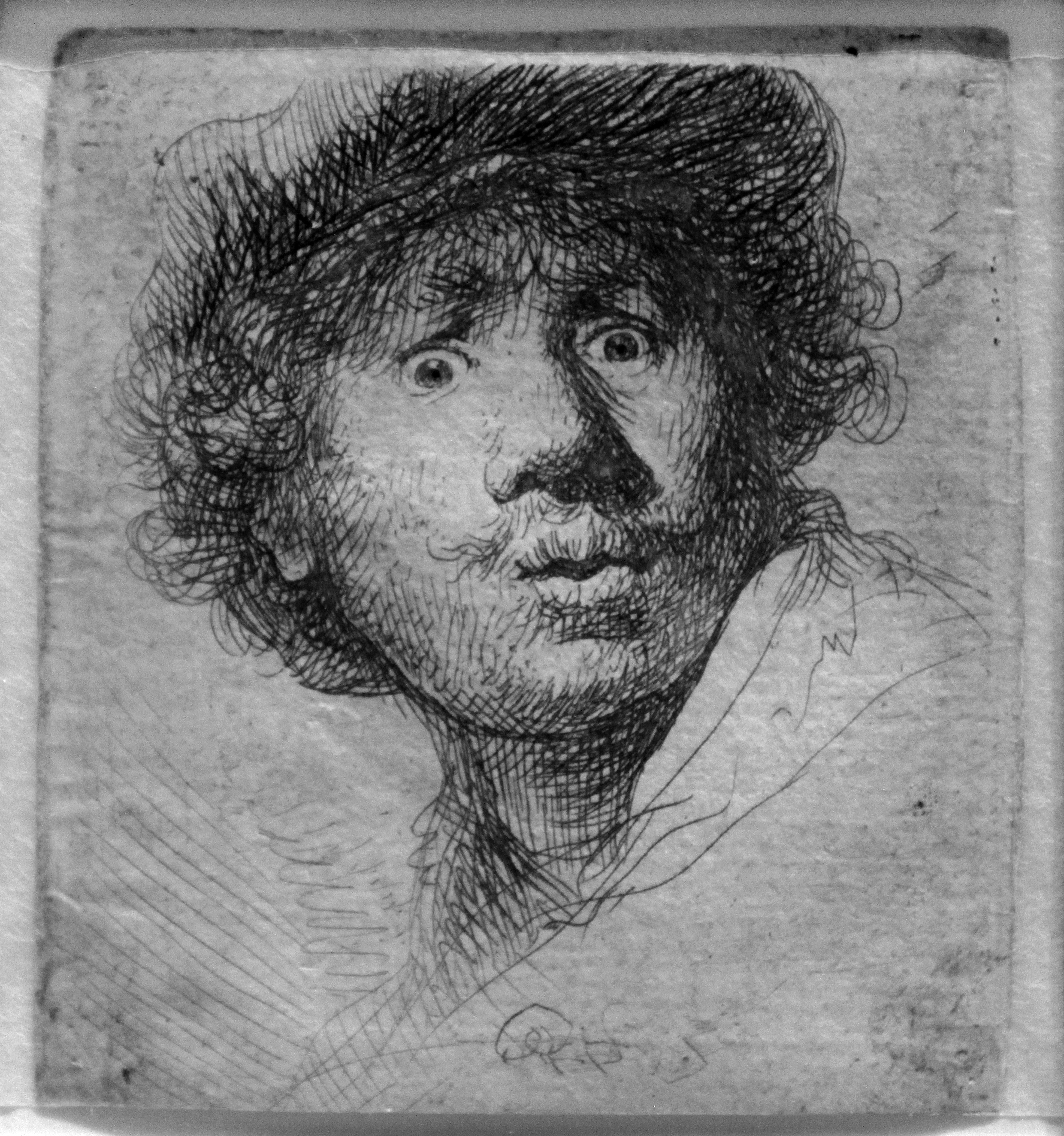
Wide-Eyed Self-Portrait by Rembrandt, 1630

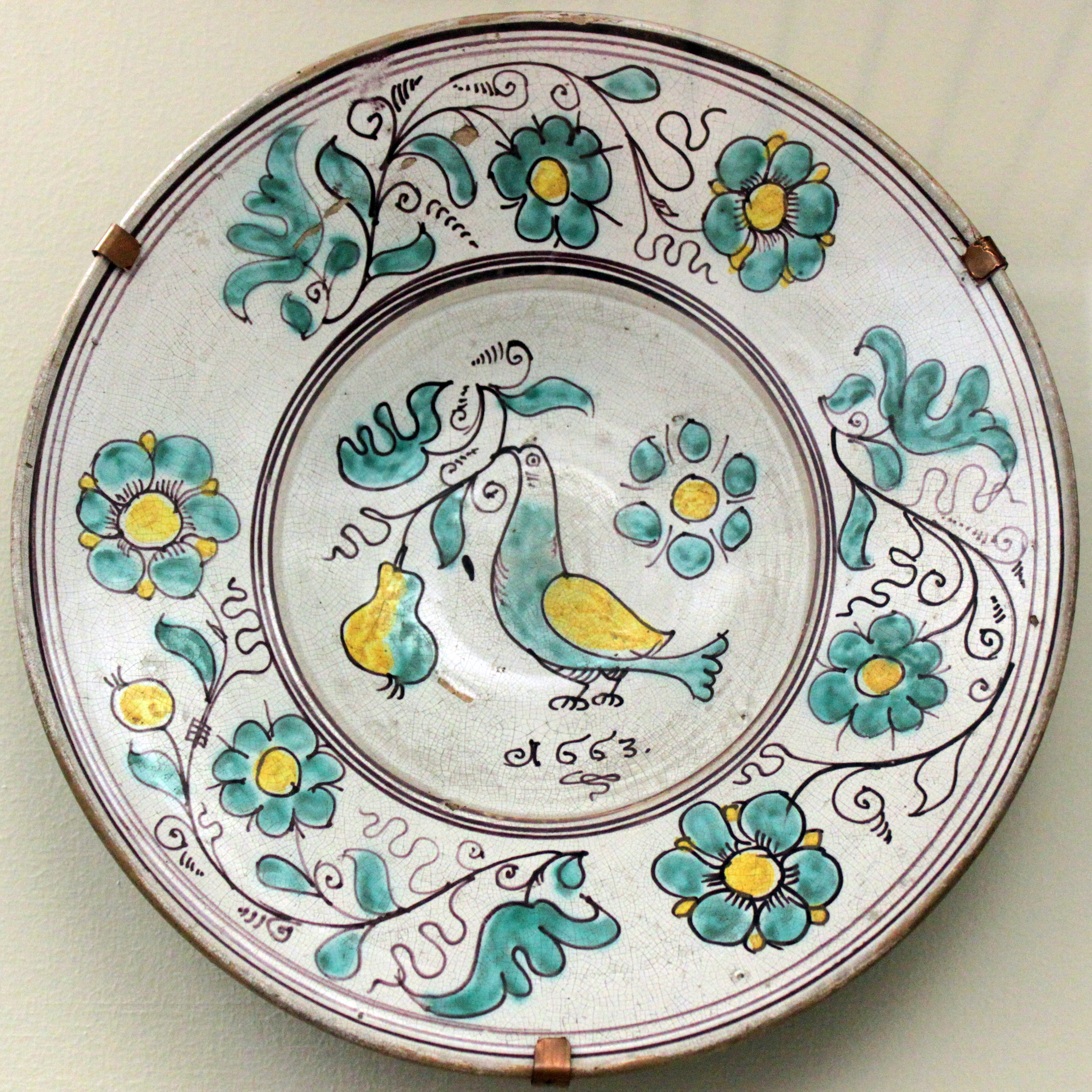
Bowl from Zittau, faience, 1663

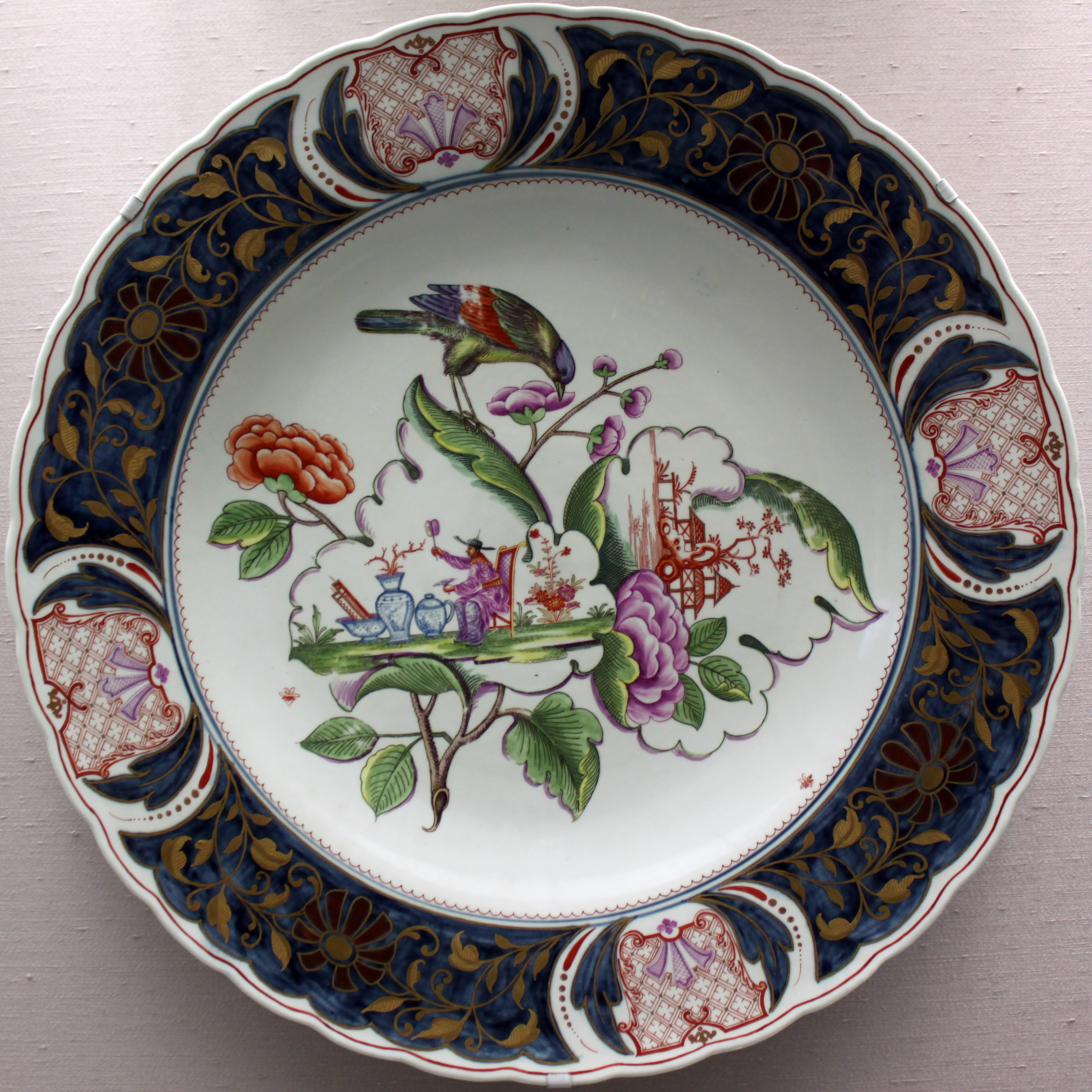
Bowl, Vienna, 1725

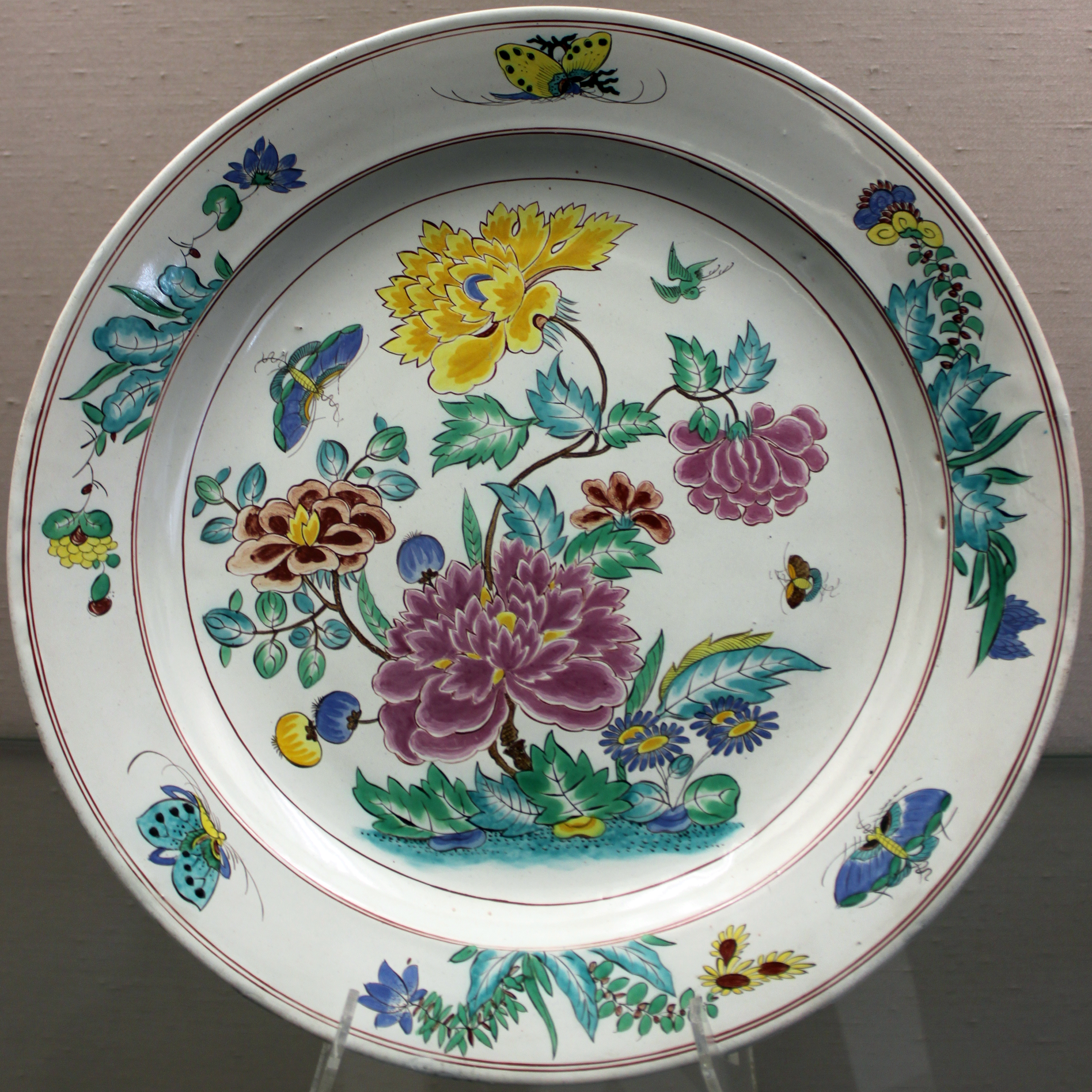
Bowl with Chinese Flowers; faience; Fulda, 1741

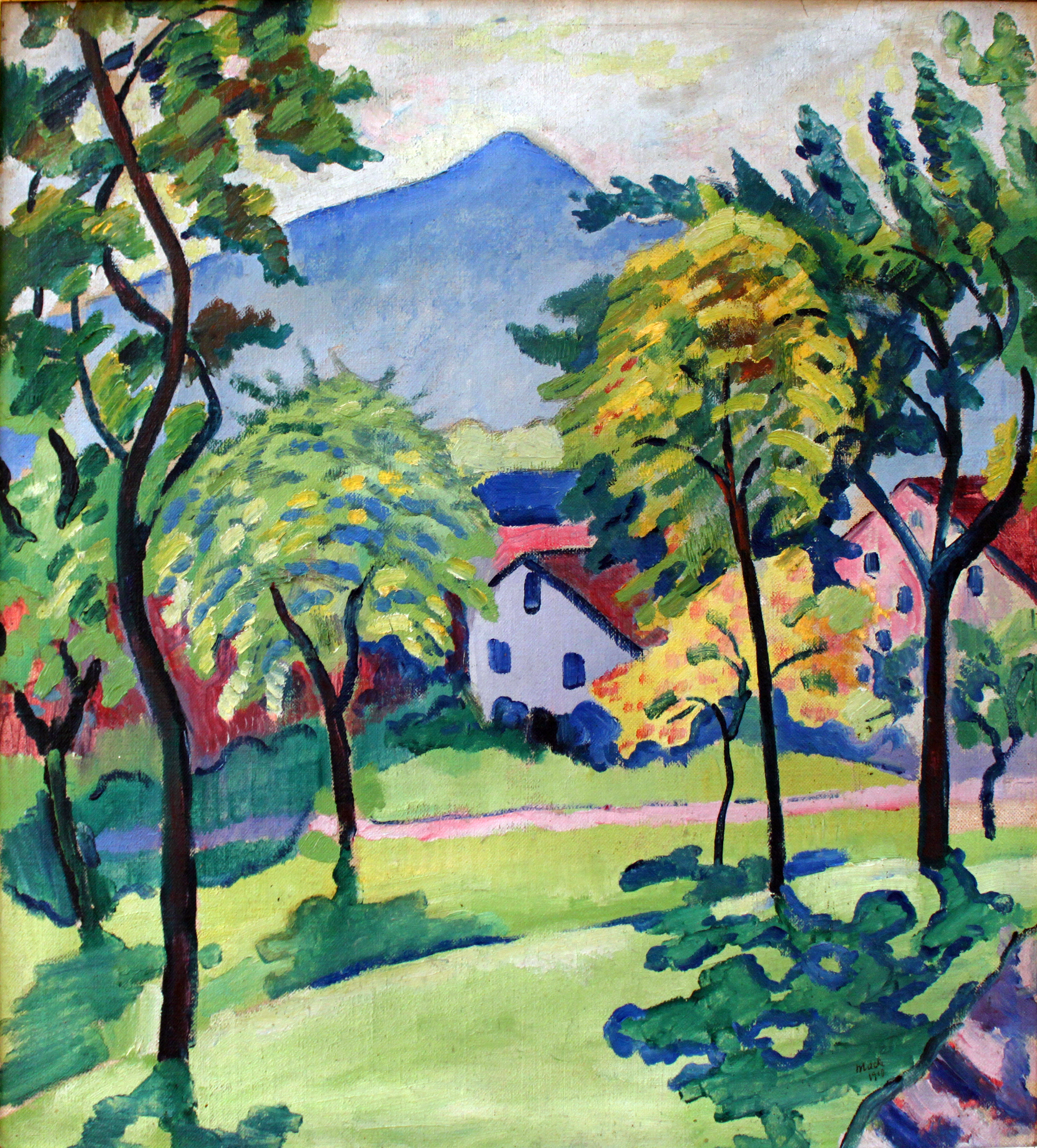
Tegernsee Landscape, by August Macke, 1910

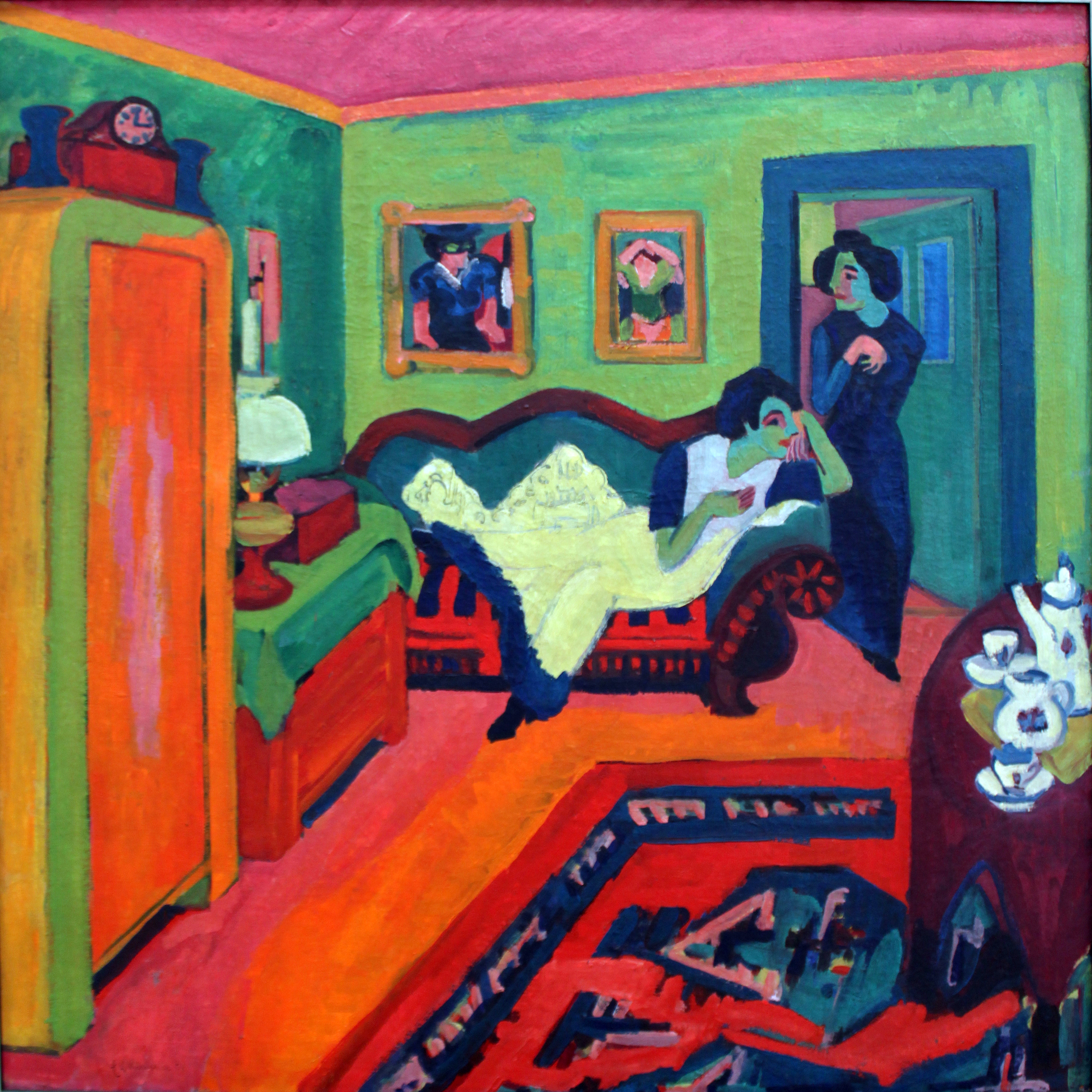
Interior with two girls, by Ernst Ludwig Kirchner, 1926
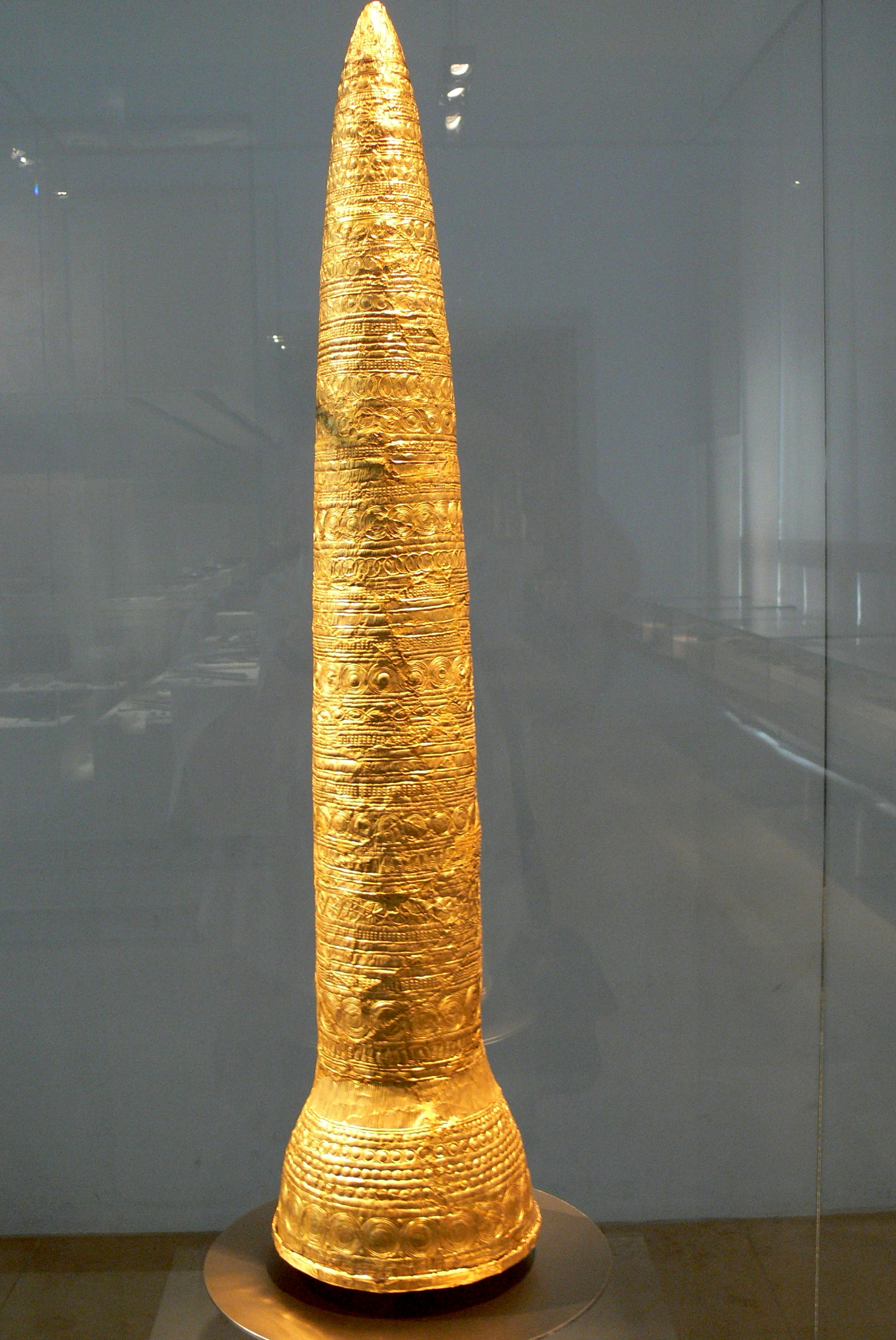
Golden hat of Ezelsdorf-Buch, c. 1000 BC

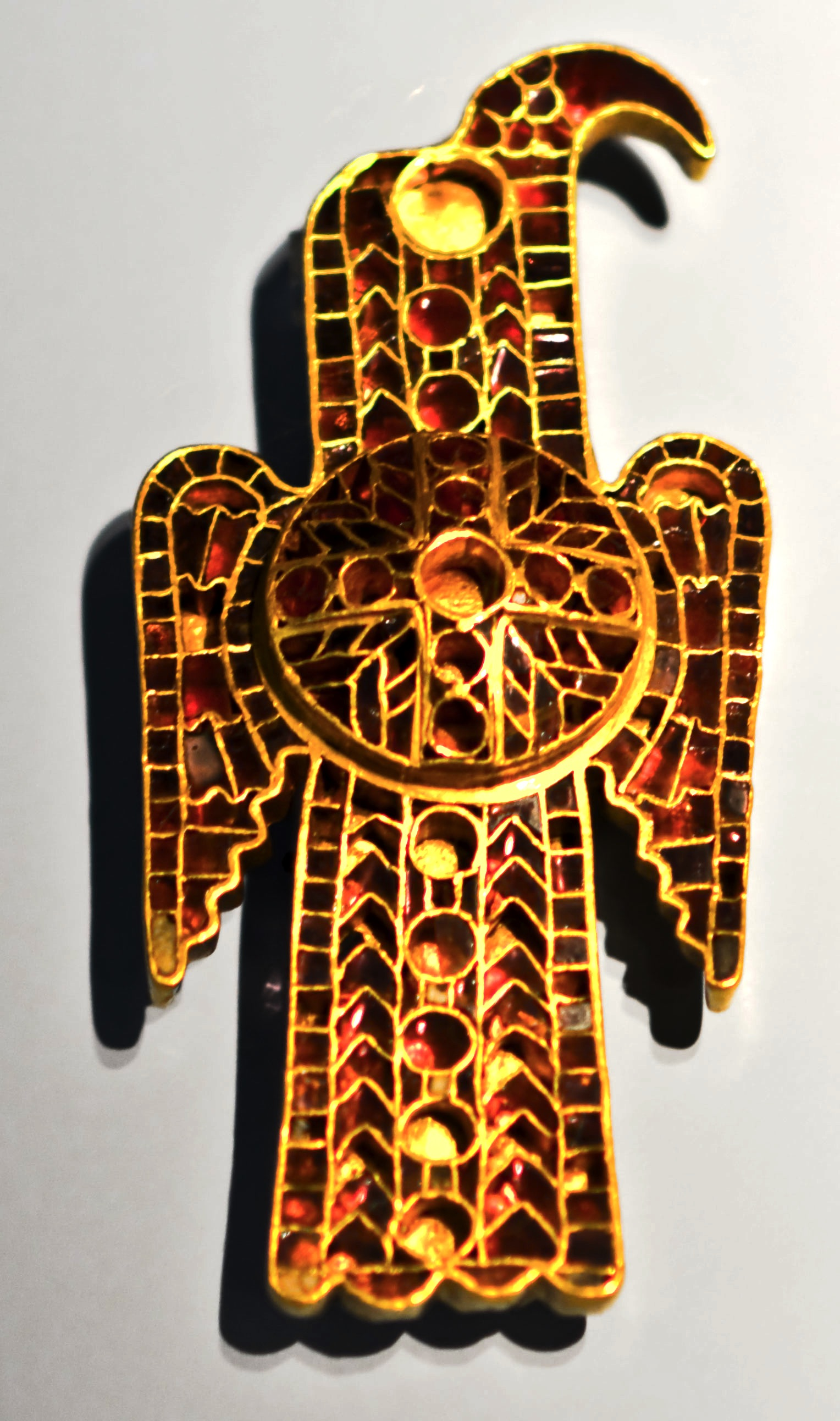
Ostrogothic eagle-shaped fibula, c. 500

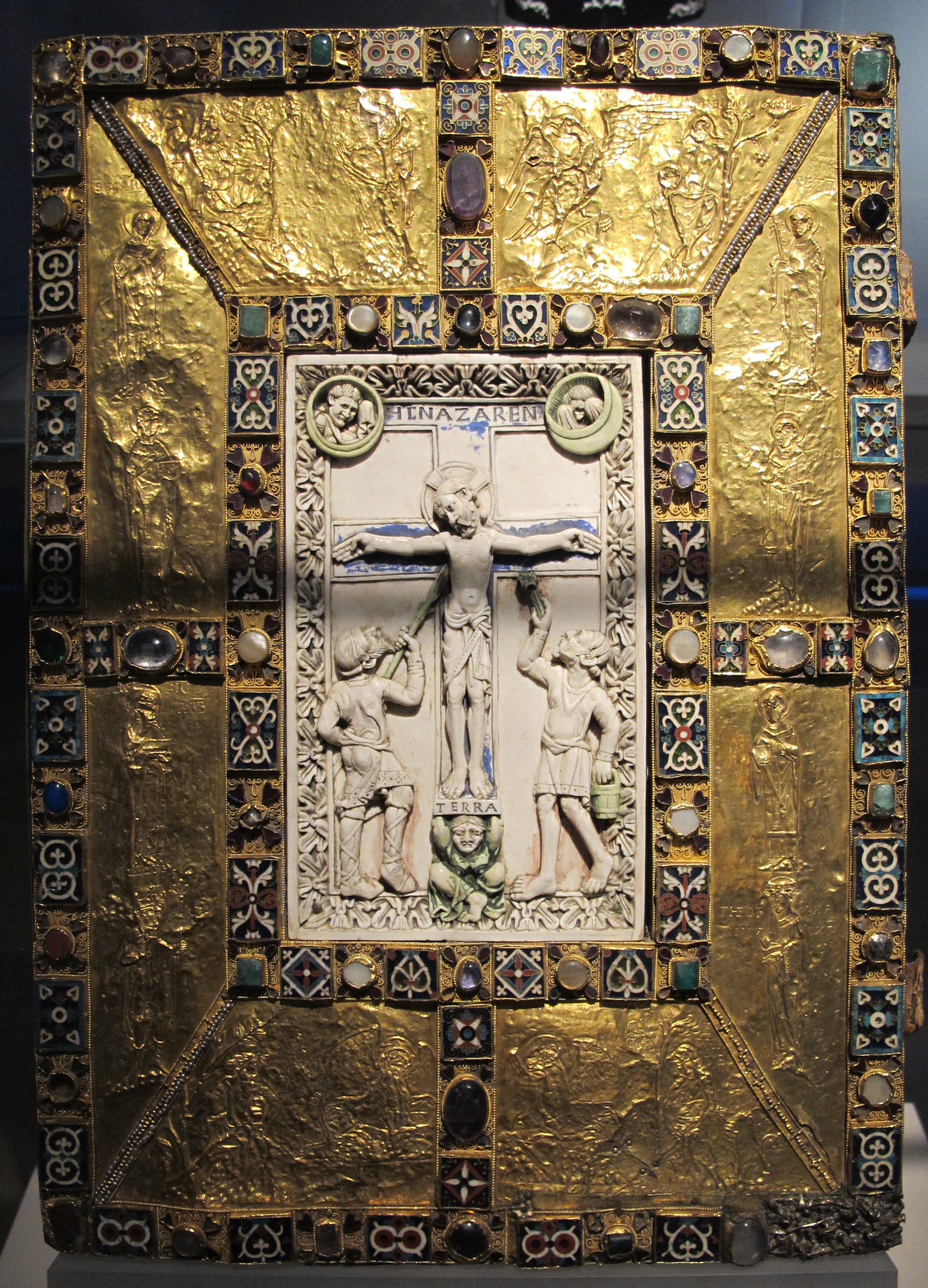
Codex Aureus, 985–987

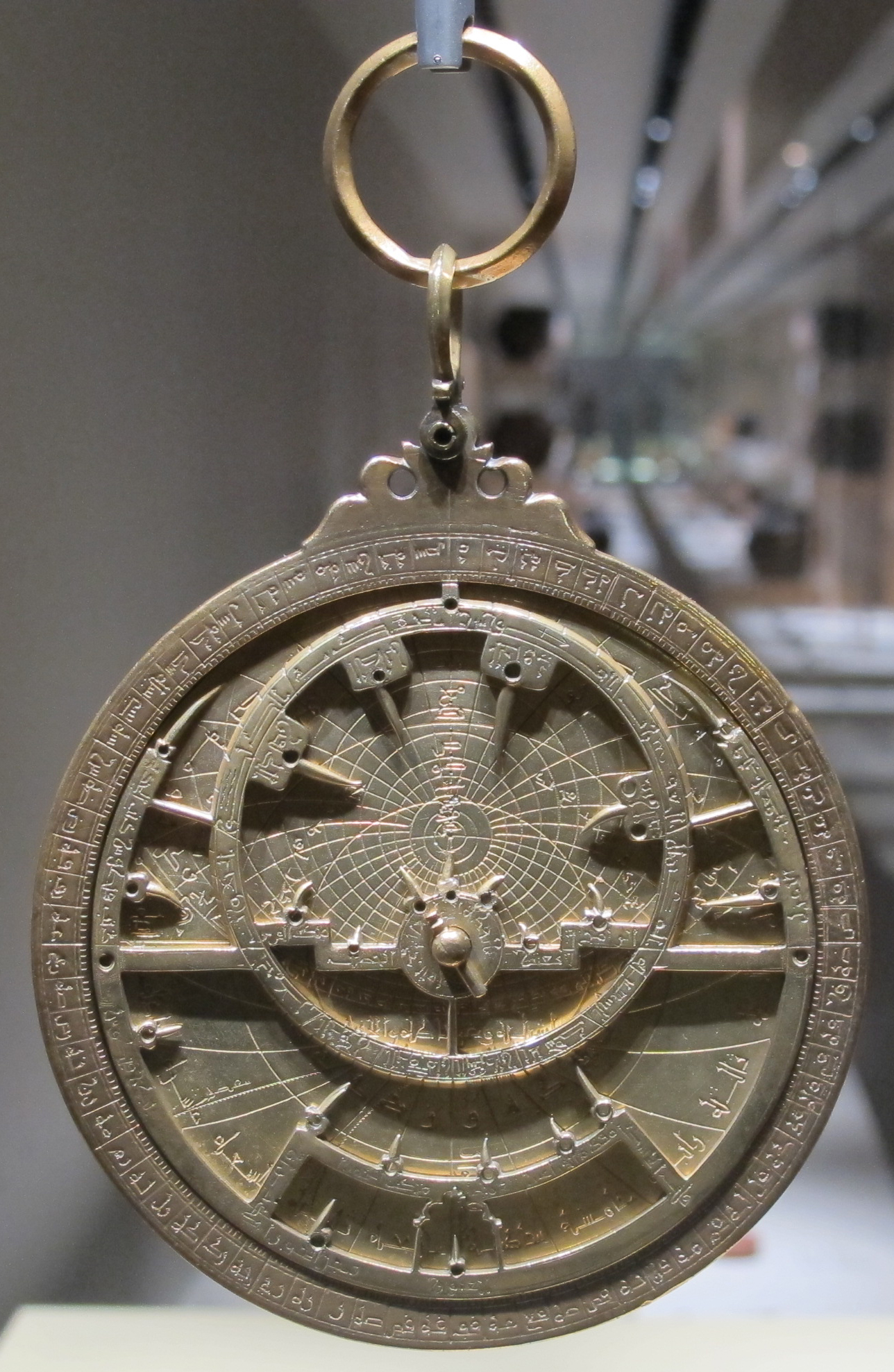
Astrolabe, c. 1080

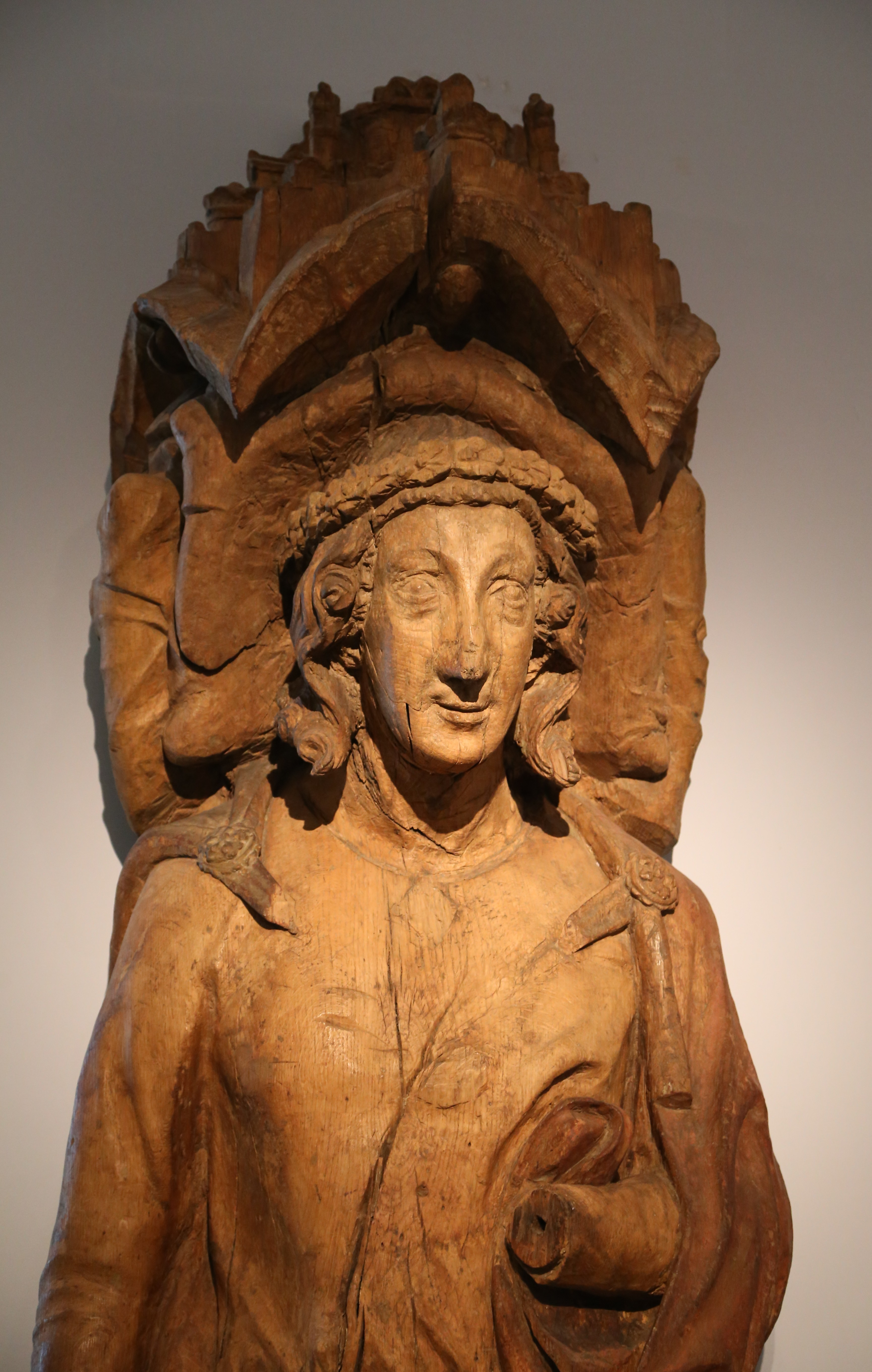
Tomb Statue, c. 1248

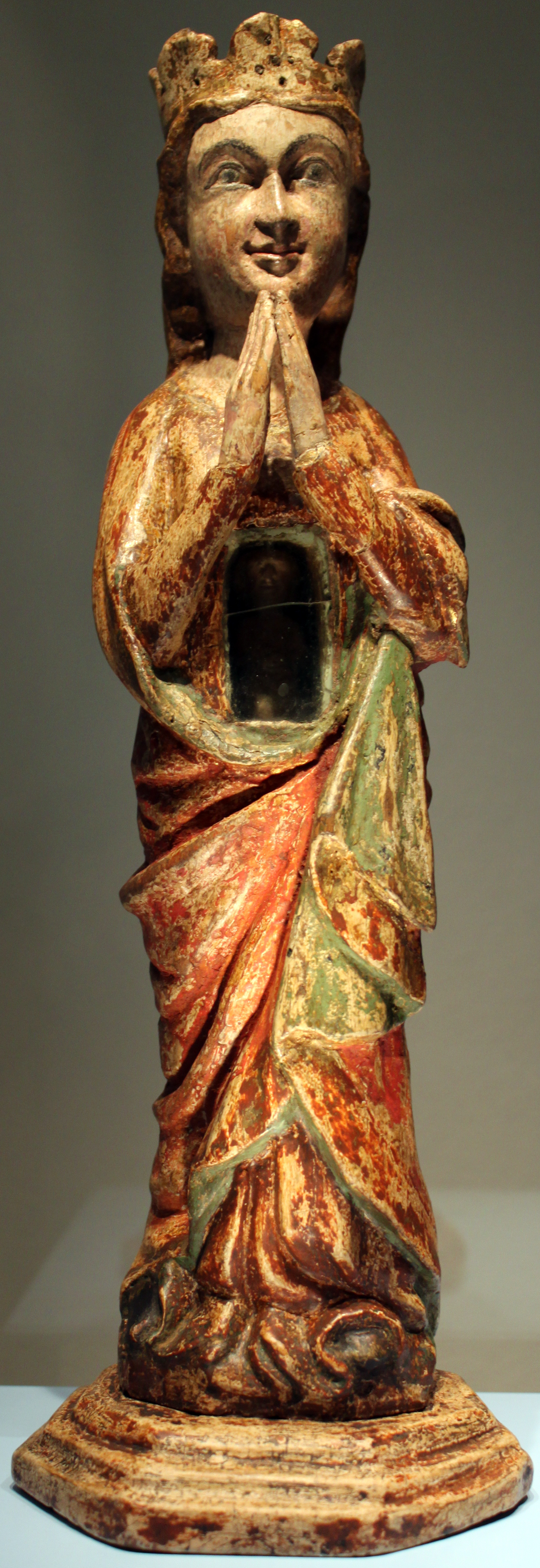
The Expectant Mary; 1300

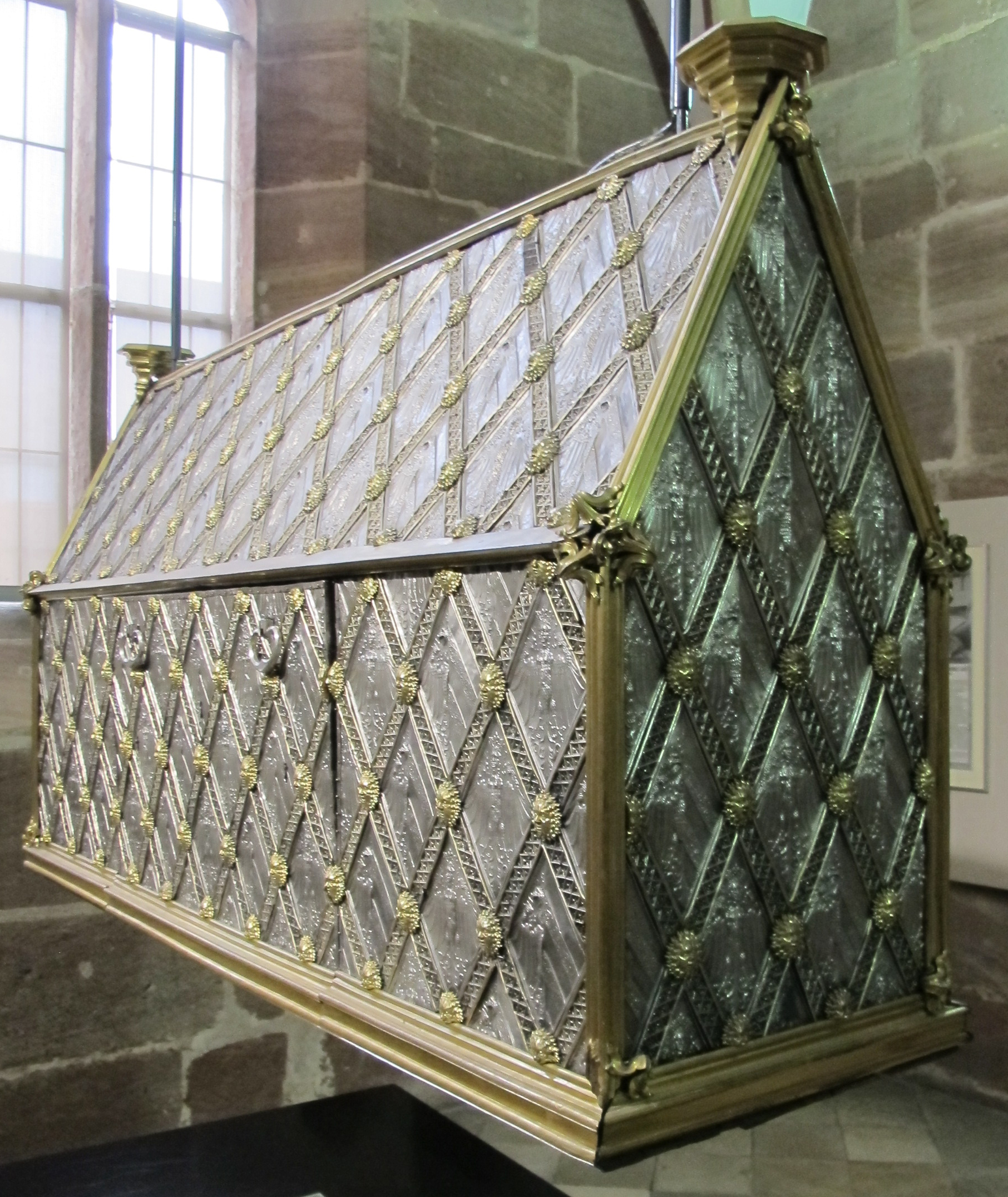
Reliquary Shrine, 1440

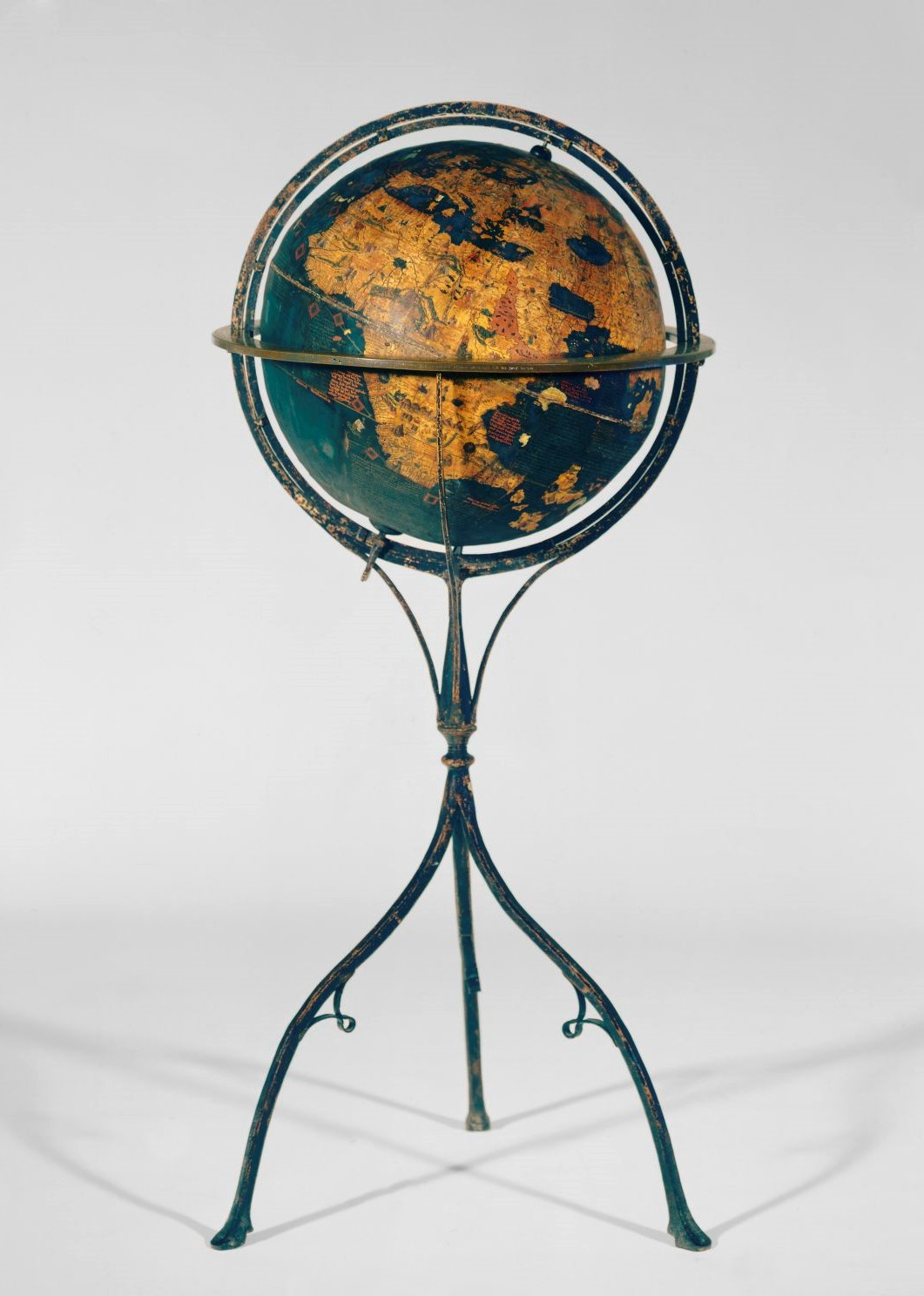
Erdapfel by Martin Behaim, oldest existing globe, 1492–1494

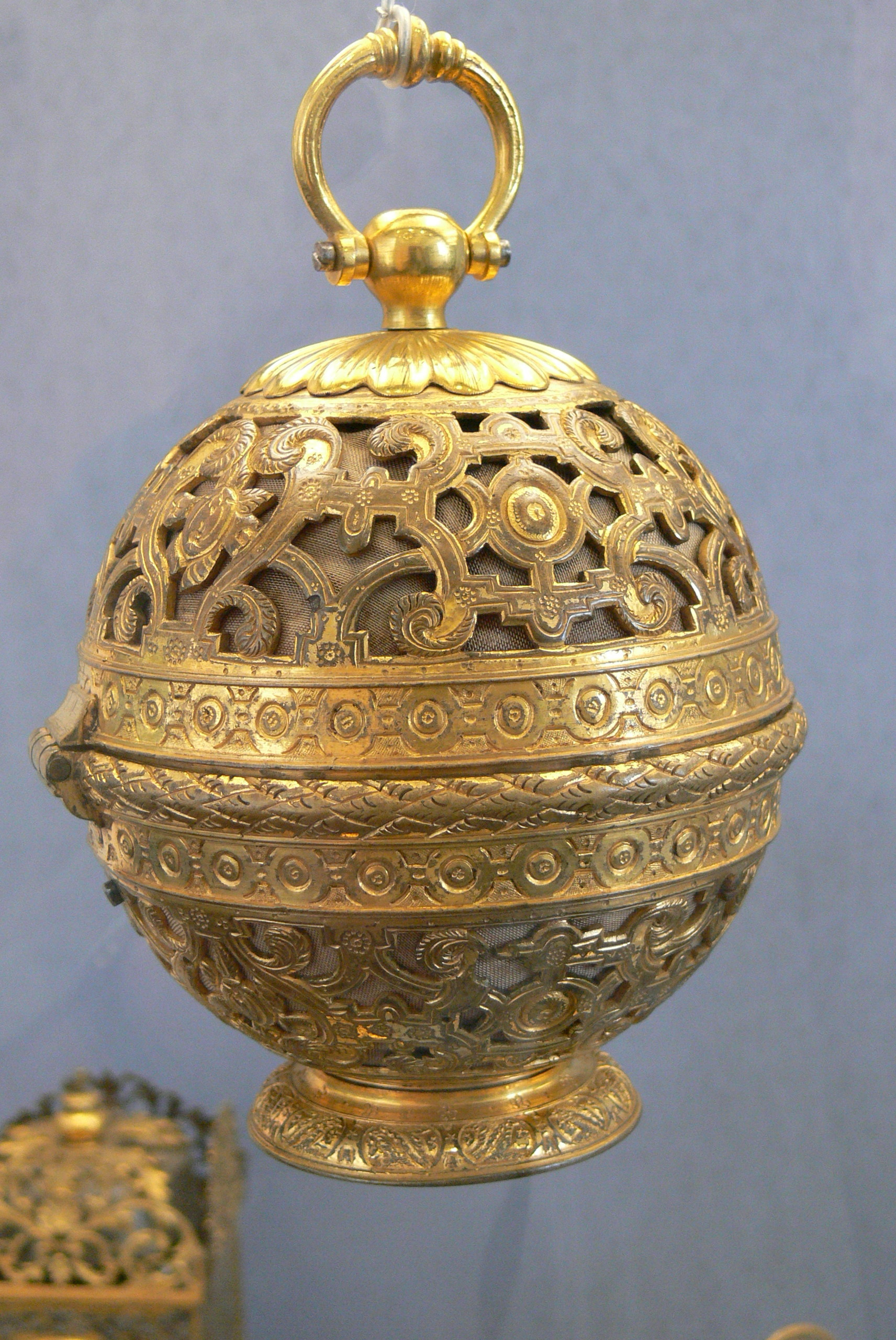
Spherical clock

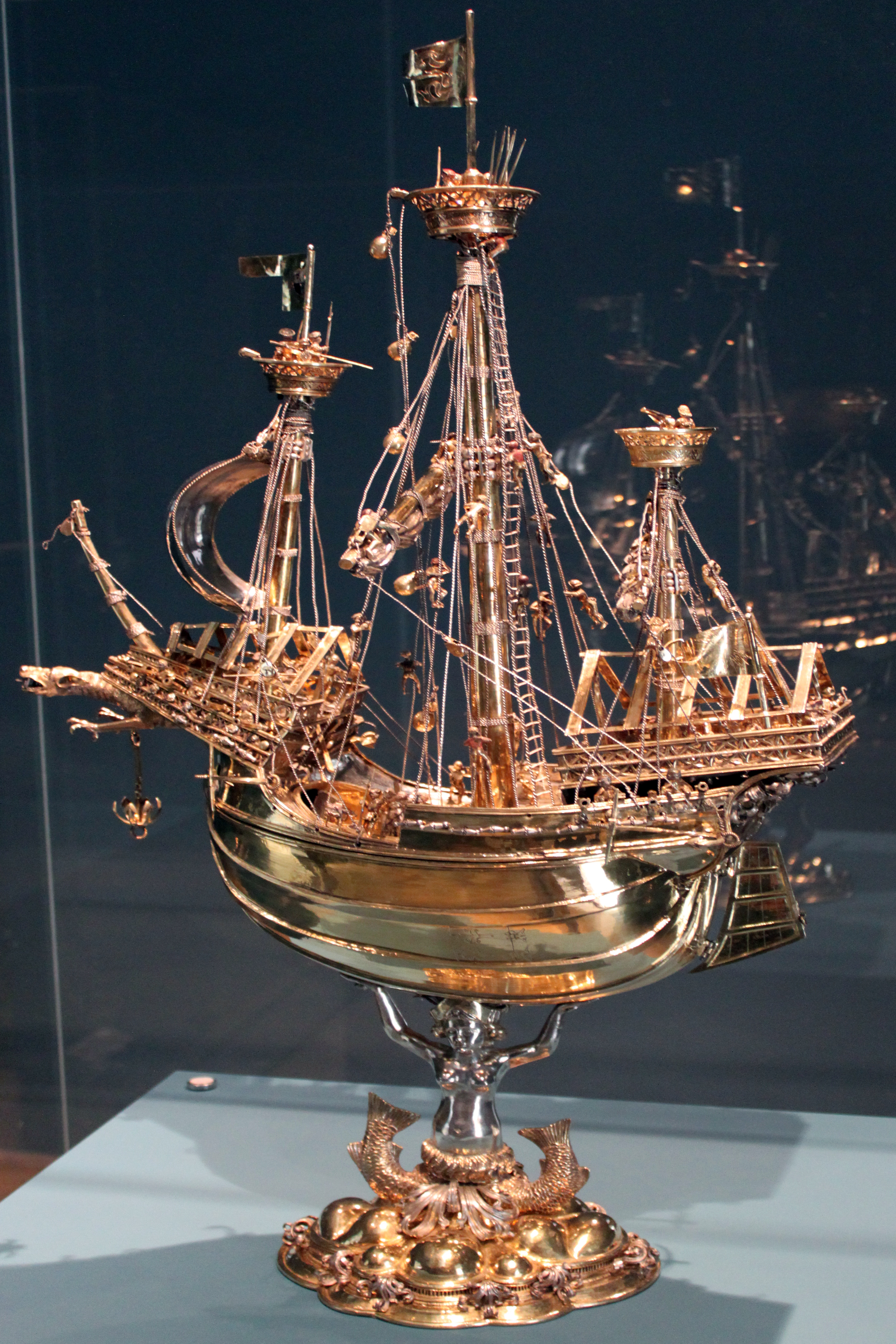
Schlüsselfelder Ship, 1502–1504

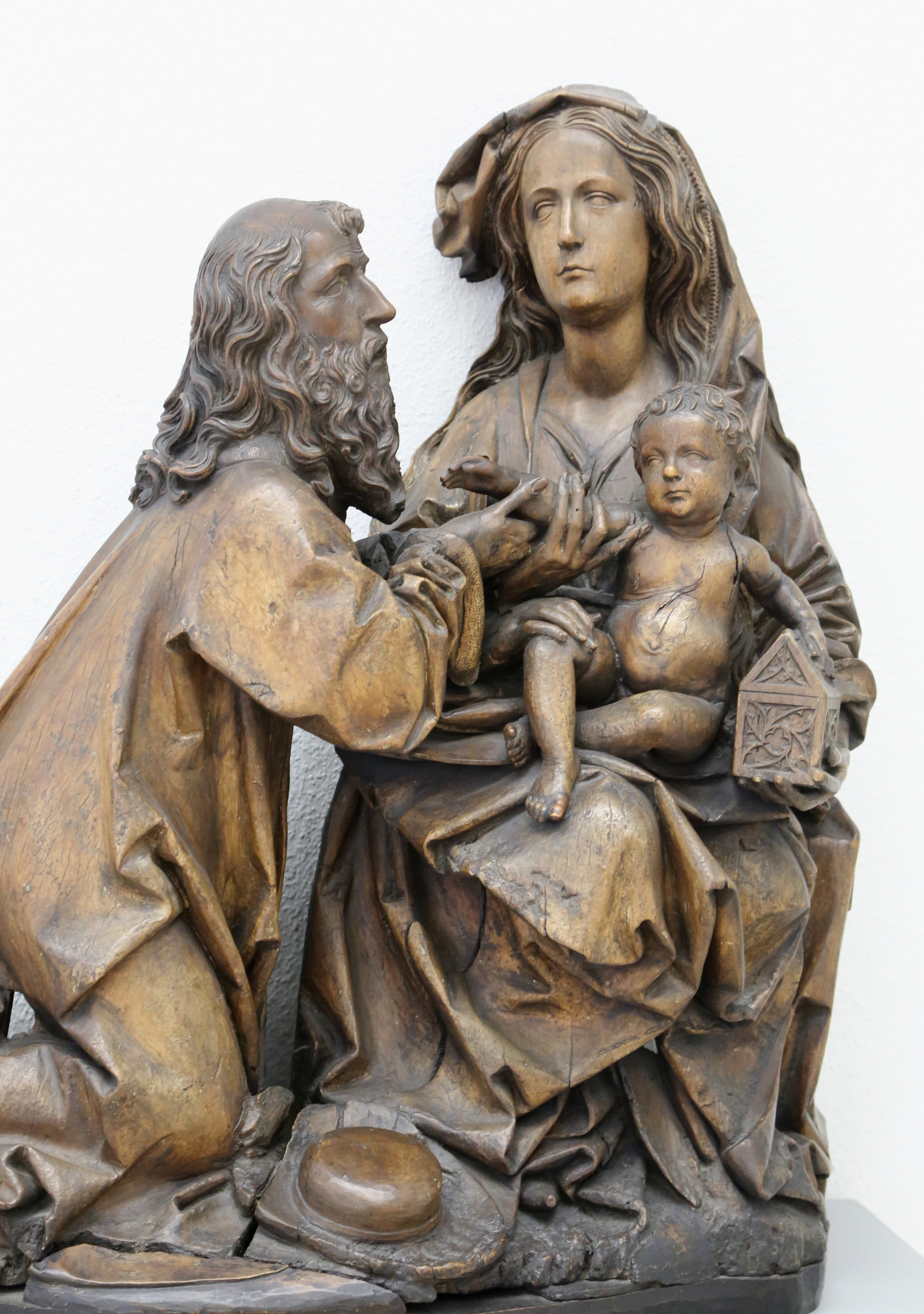
Adoration of the Magi, by Tilman Riemenschneider, c. 1490

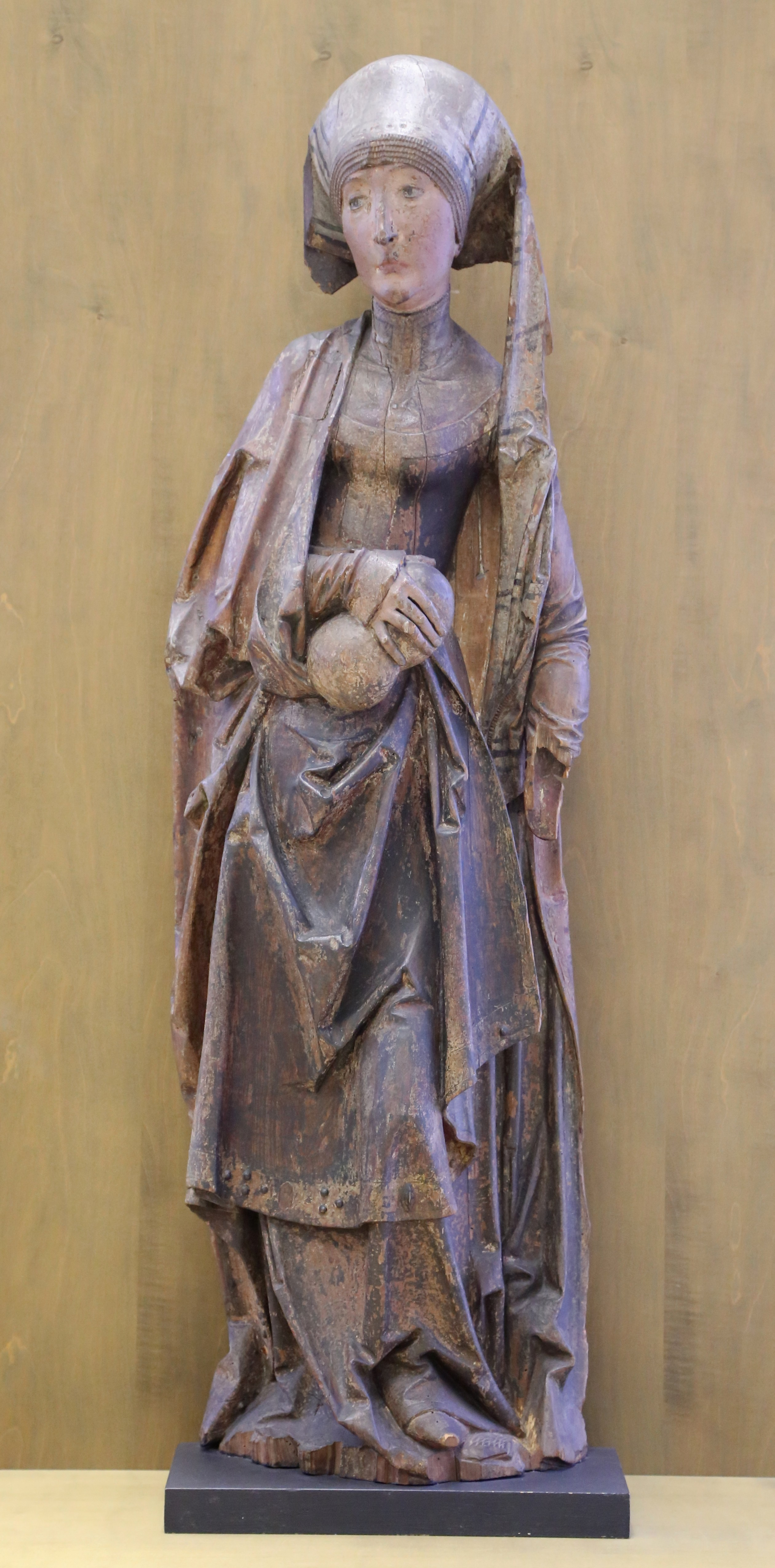
Saint Elizabeth of Hungary), by Tilman Riemenschneider, c. 1510

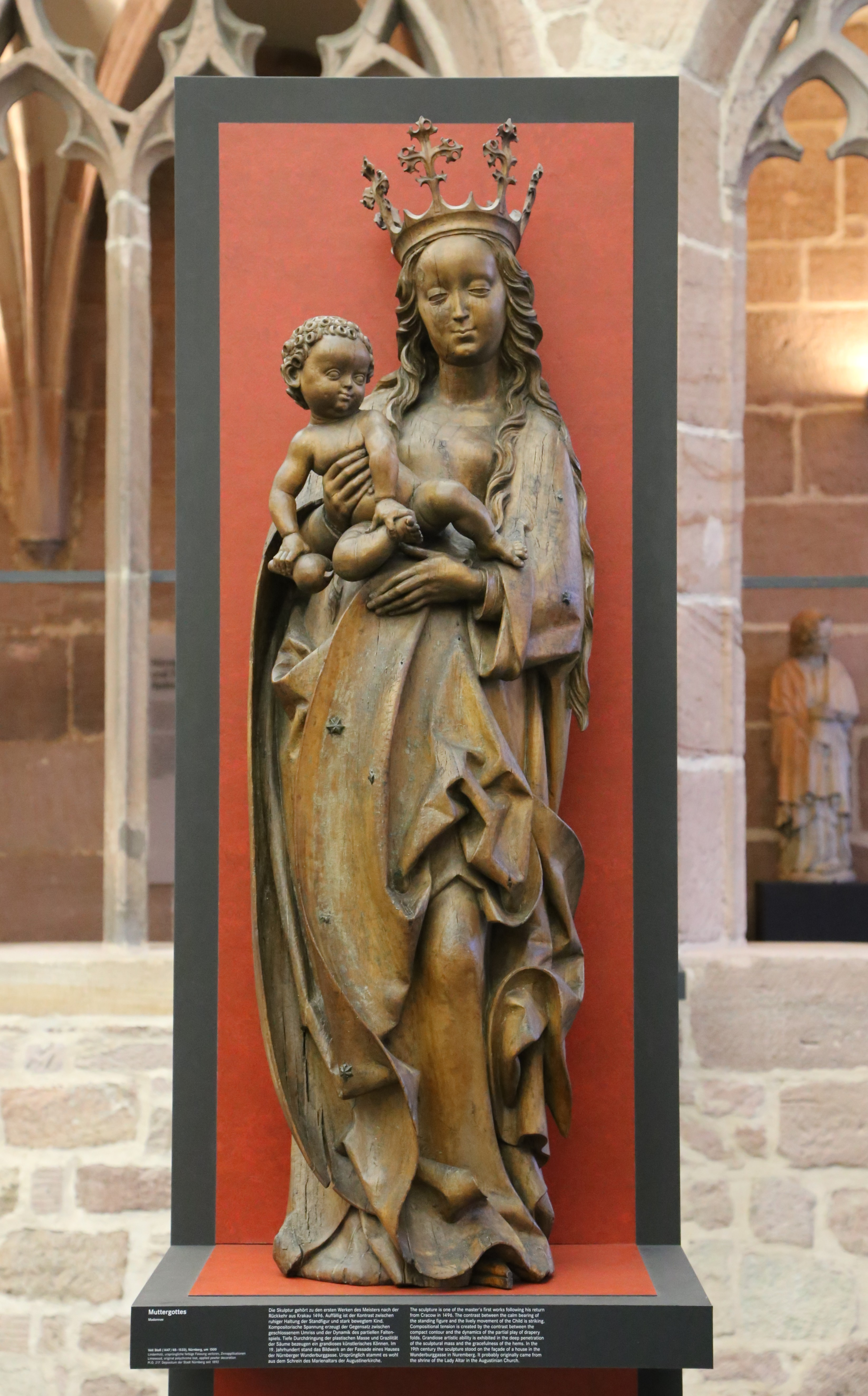
Mother of God, by Veit Stoss, c. 1500

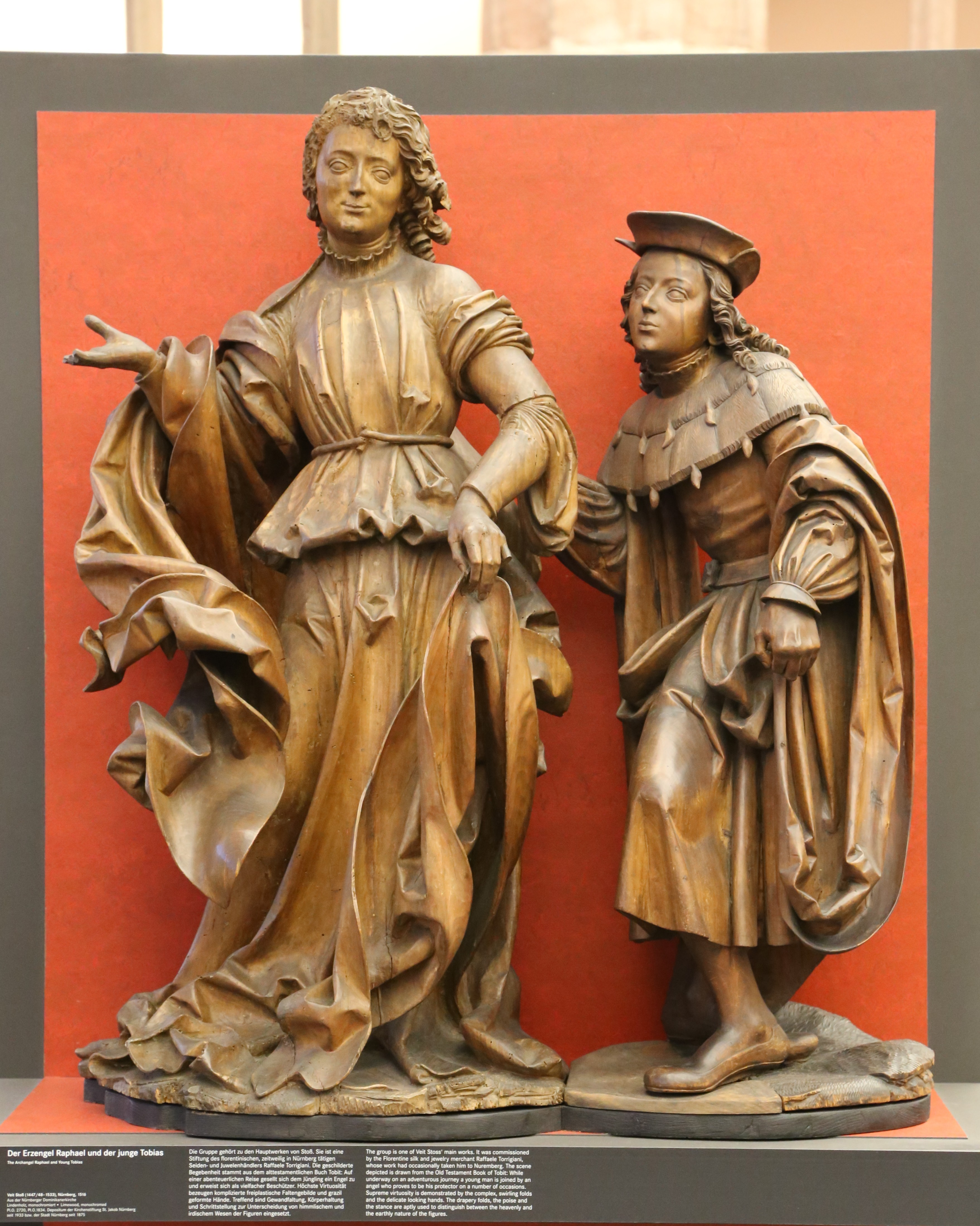
Archangel Raphael and the young Tobias, by Veit Stoss, 1516

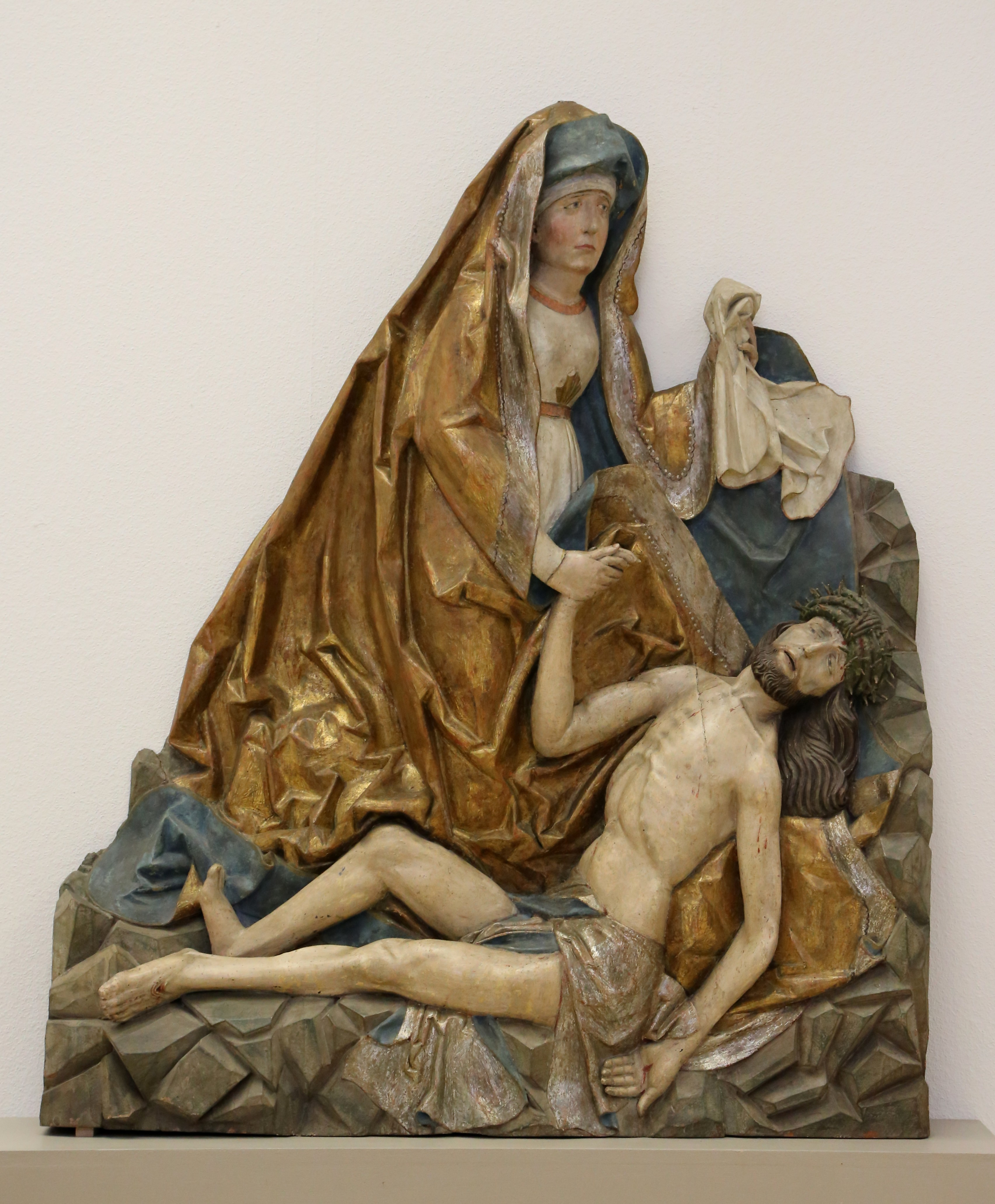
Pietà, by Philipp Koch, c. 1502–03,

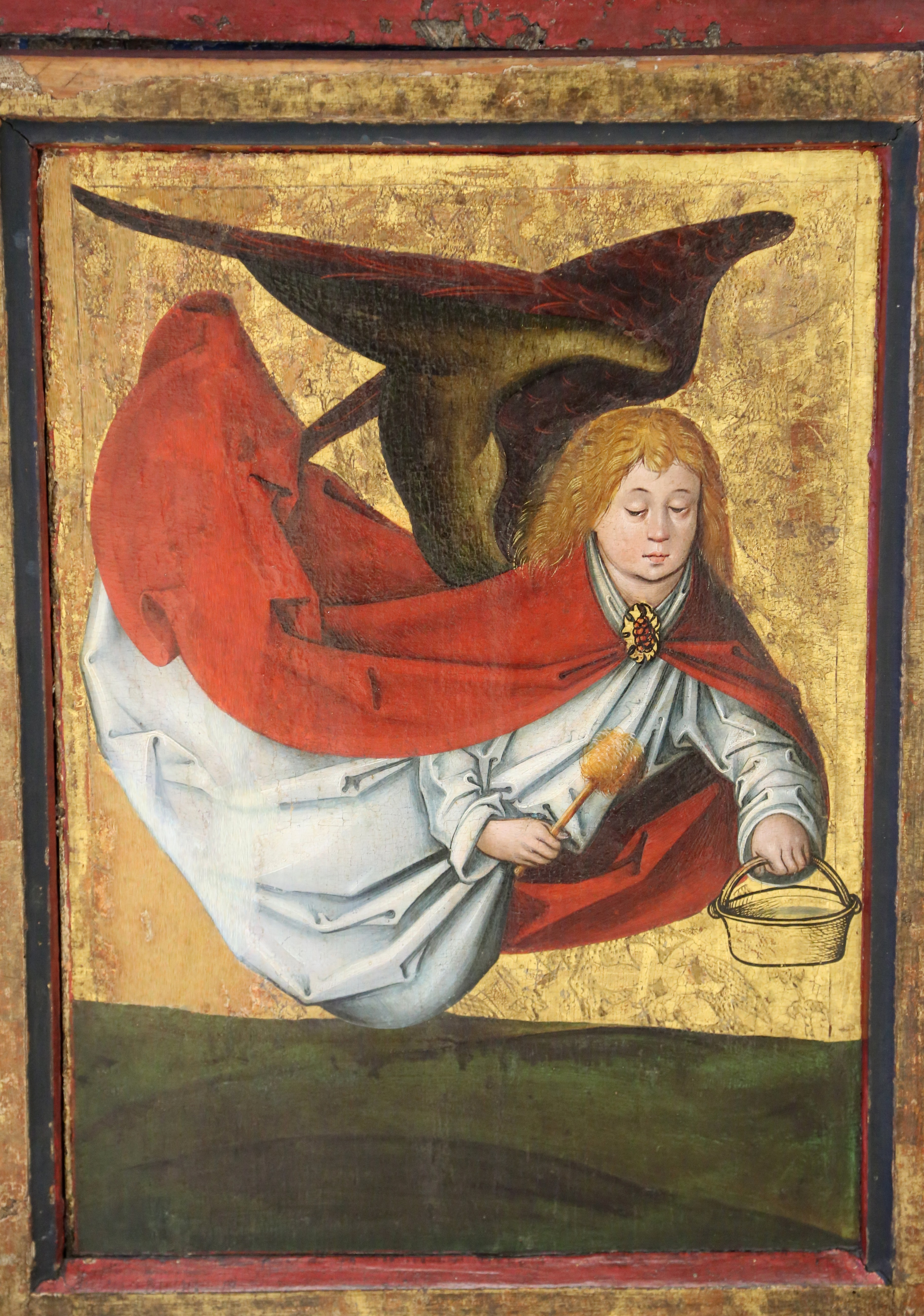
Altarpiece, c. 1500, detail

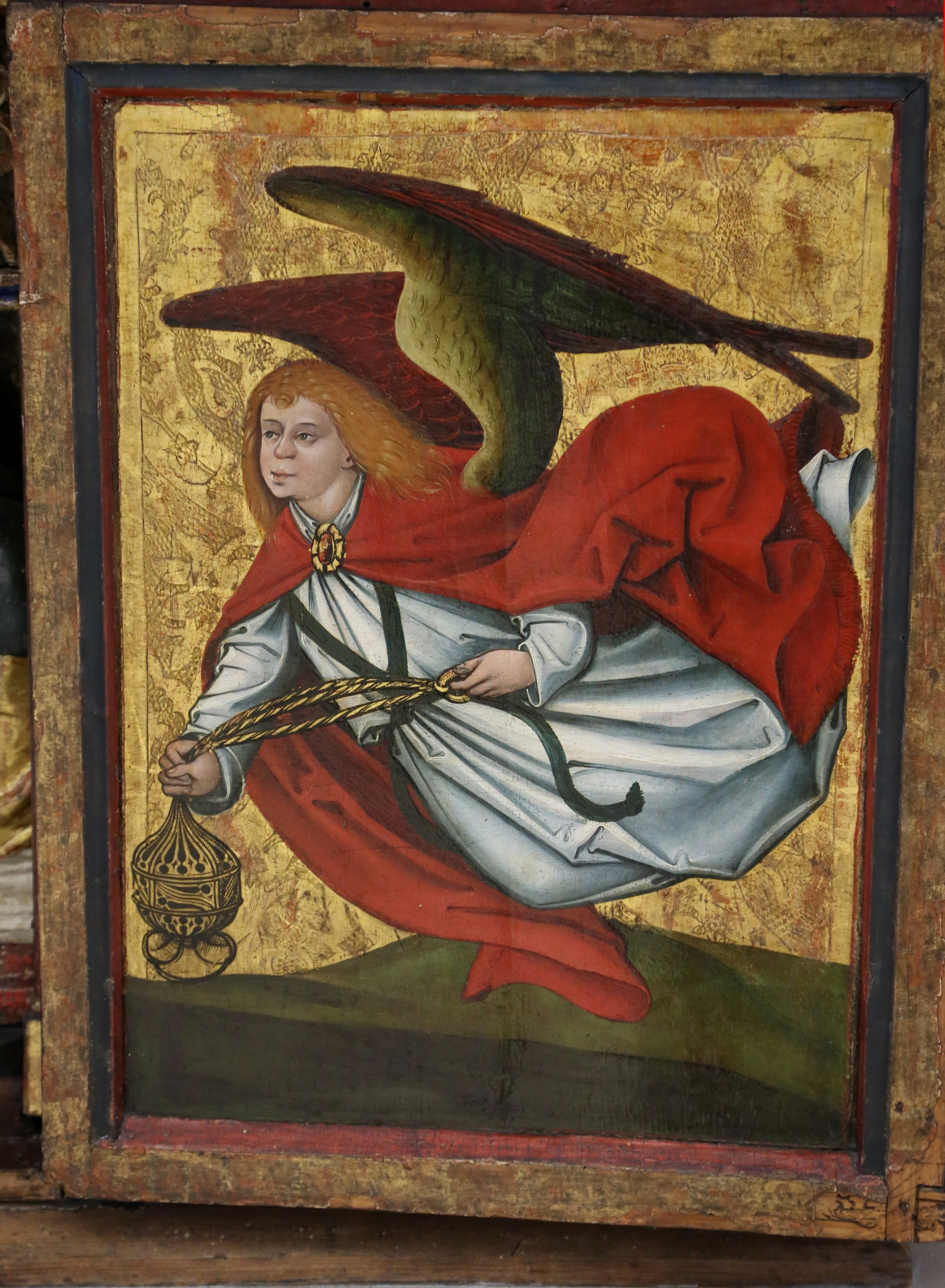
Altarpiece, c. 1500, detail

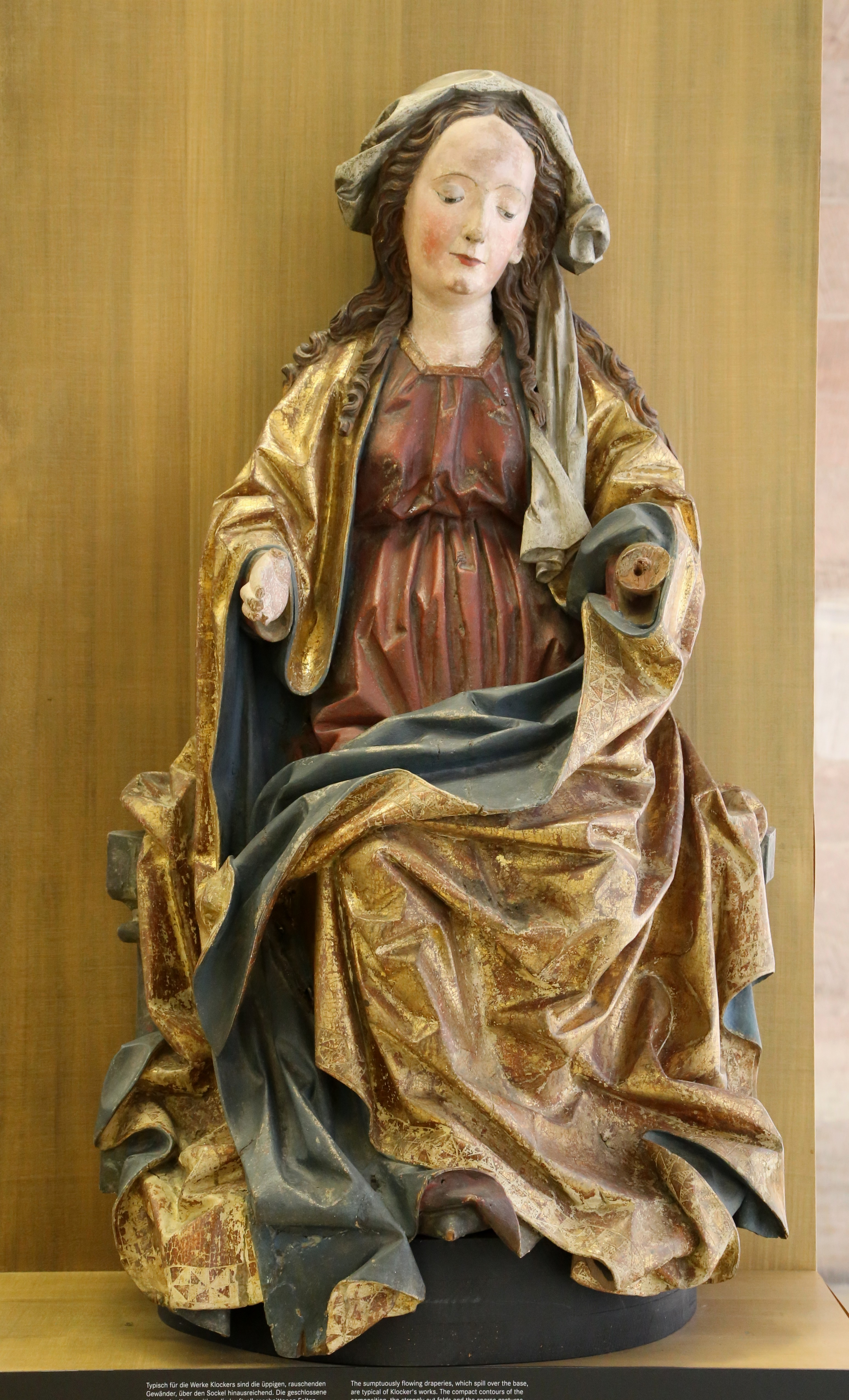
Mother of God, by Hans Klocker, c. 1495,

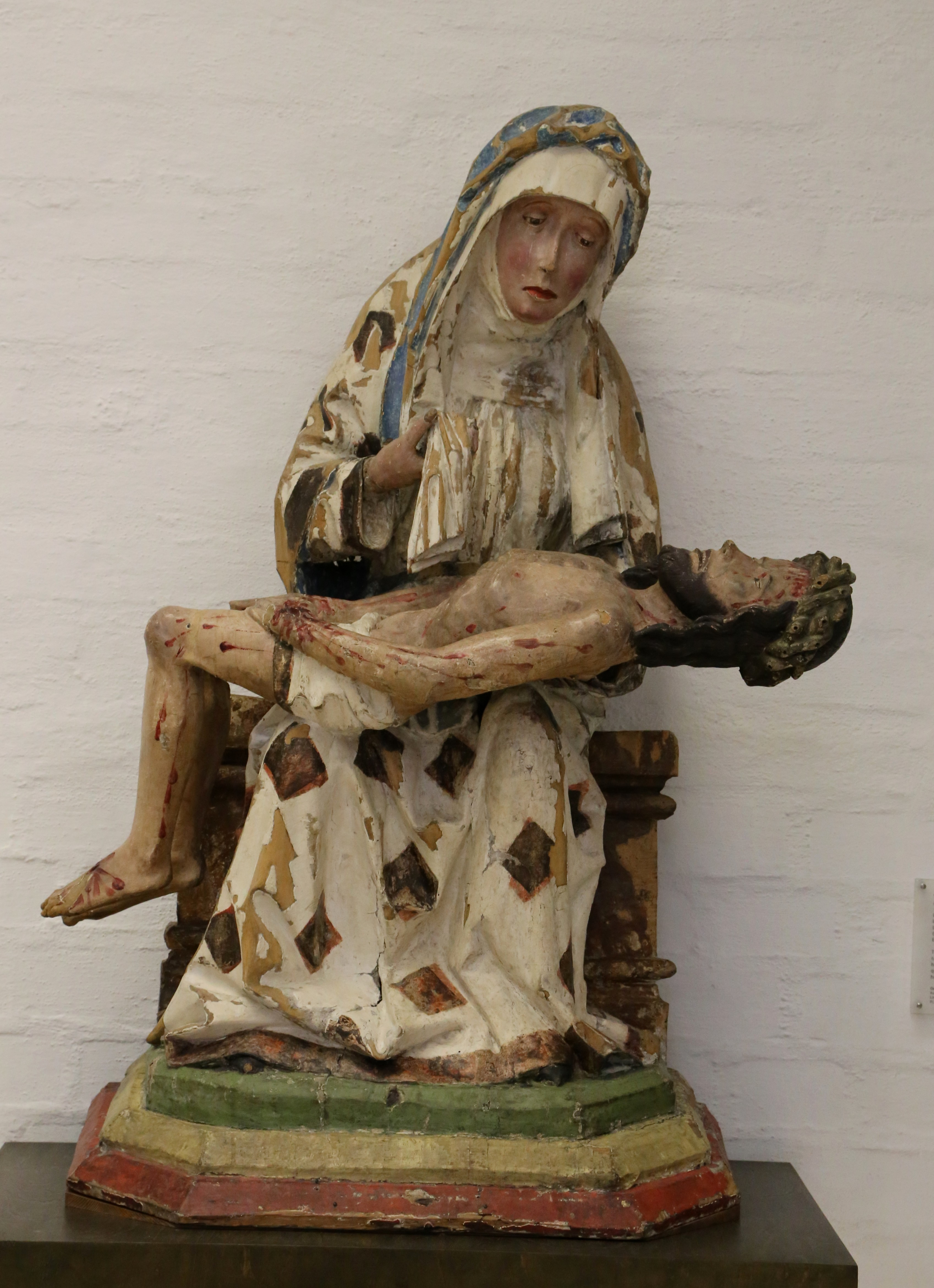
Pietà, c. 1490

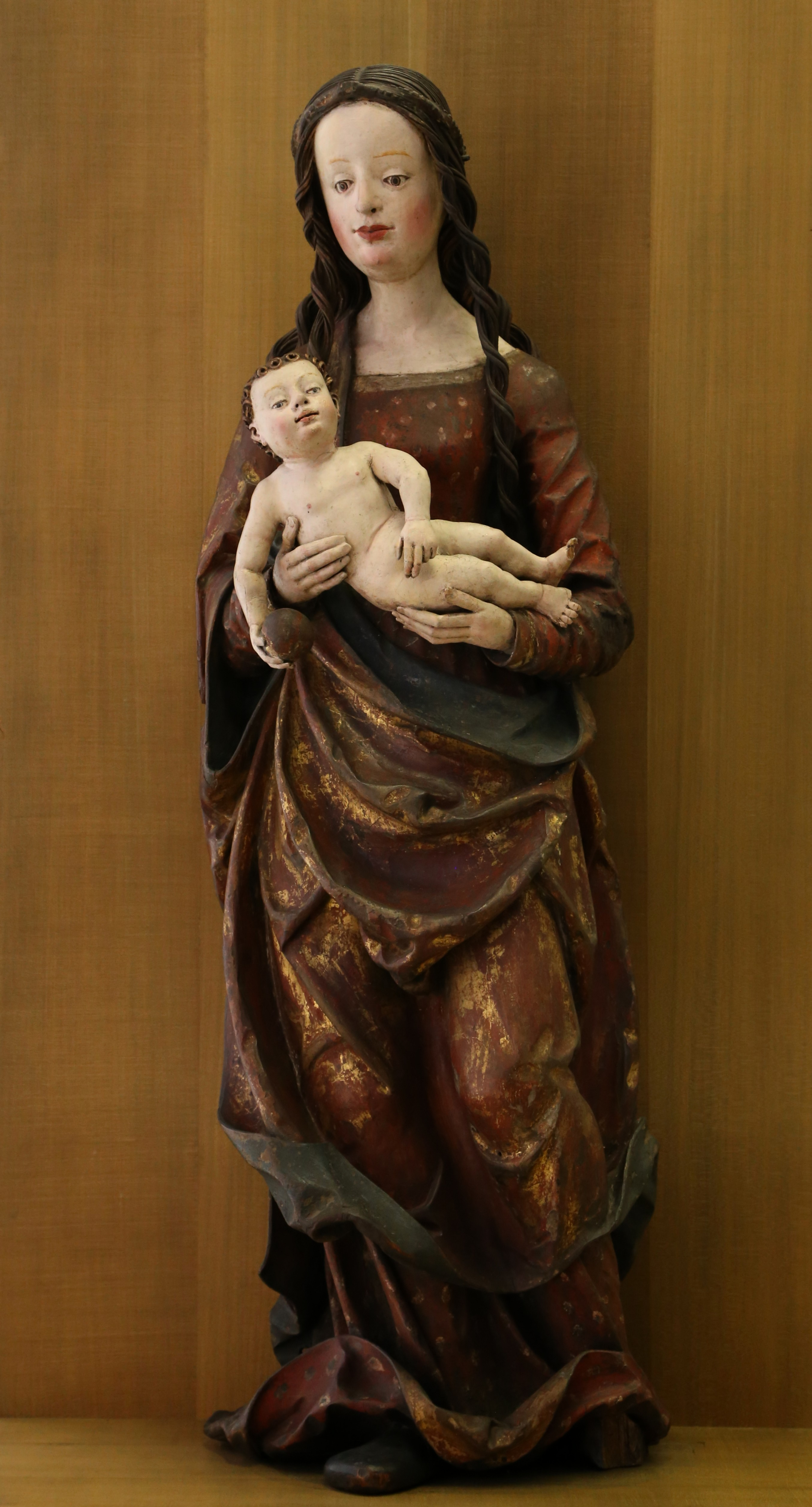
Mother of God, by Michael Parth, c. 1520,

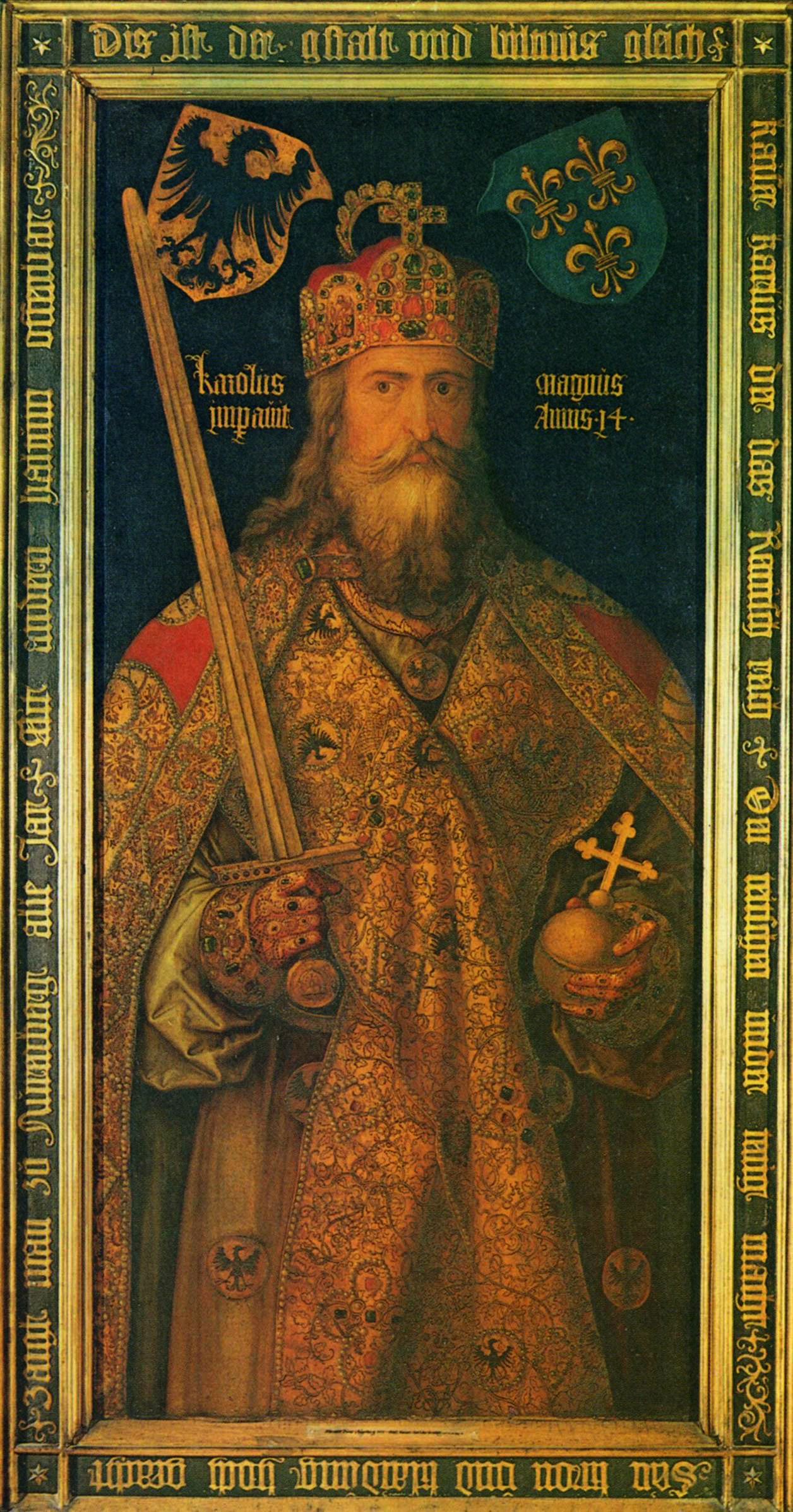
Emperor Charlemagne, by Albrecht Dürer, 1511–1513

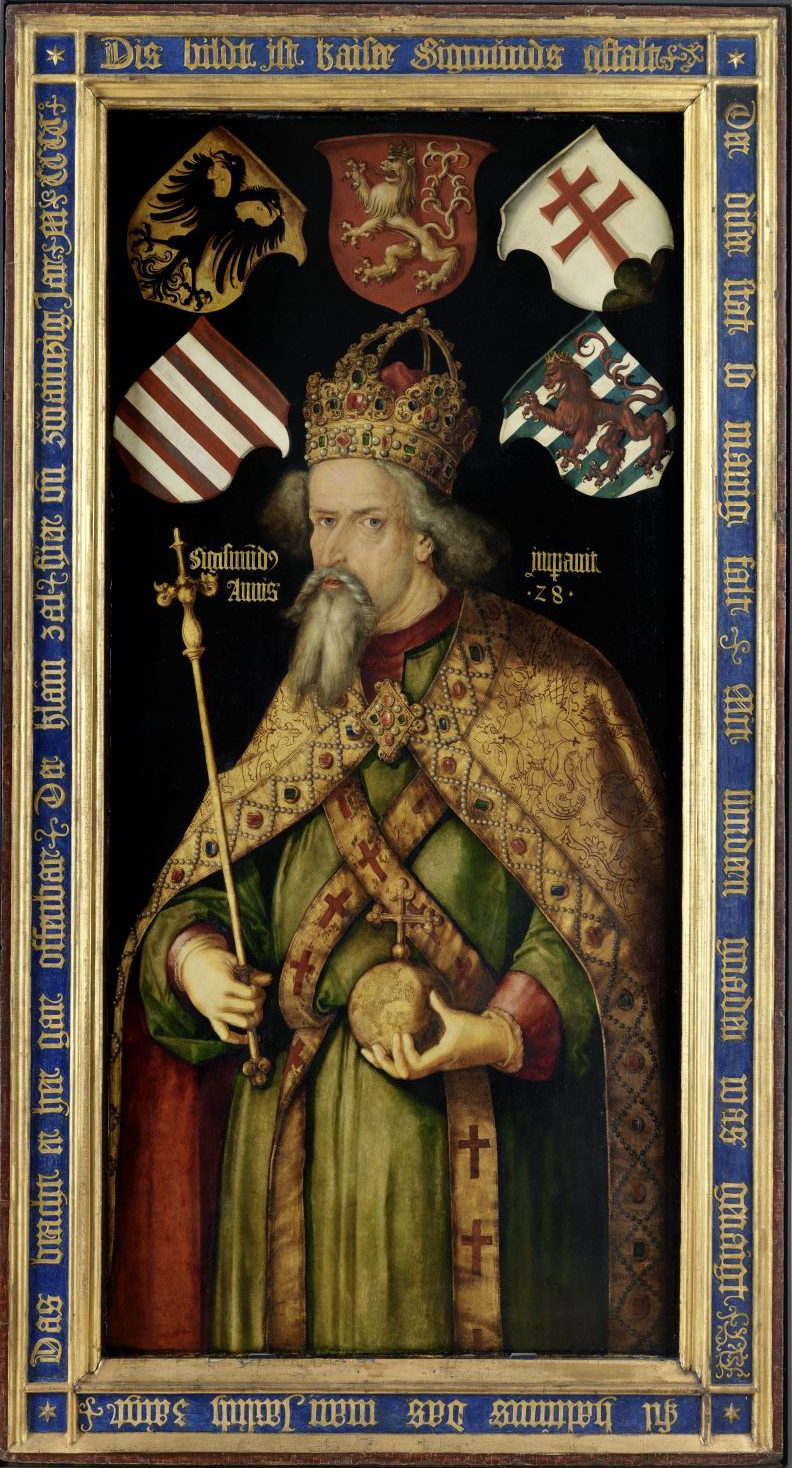
Emperor Sigismund, by Albrecht Dürer, 1509–1516

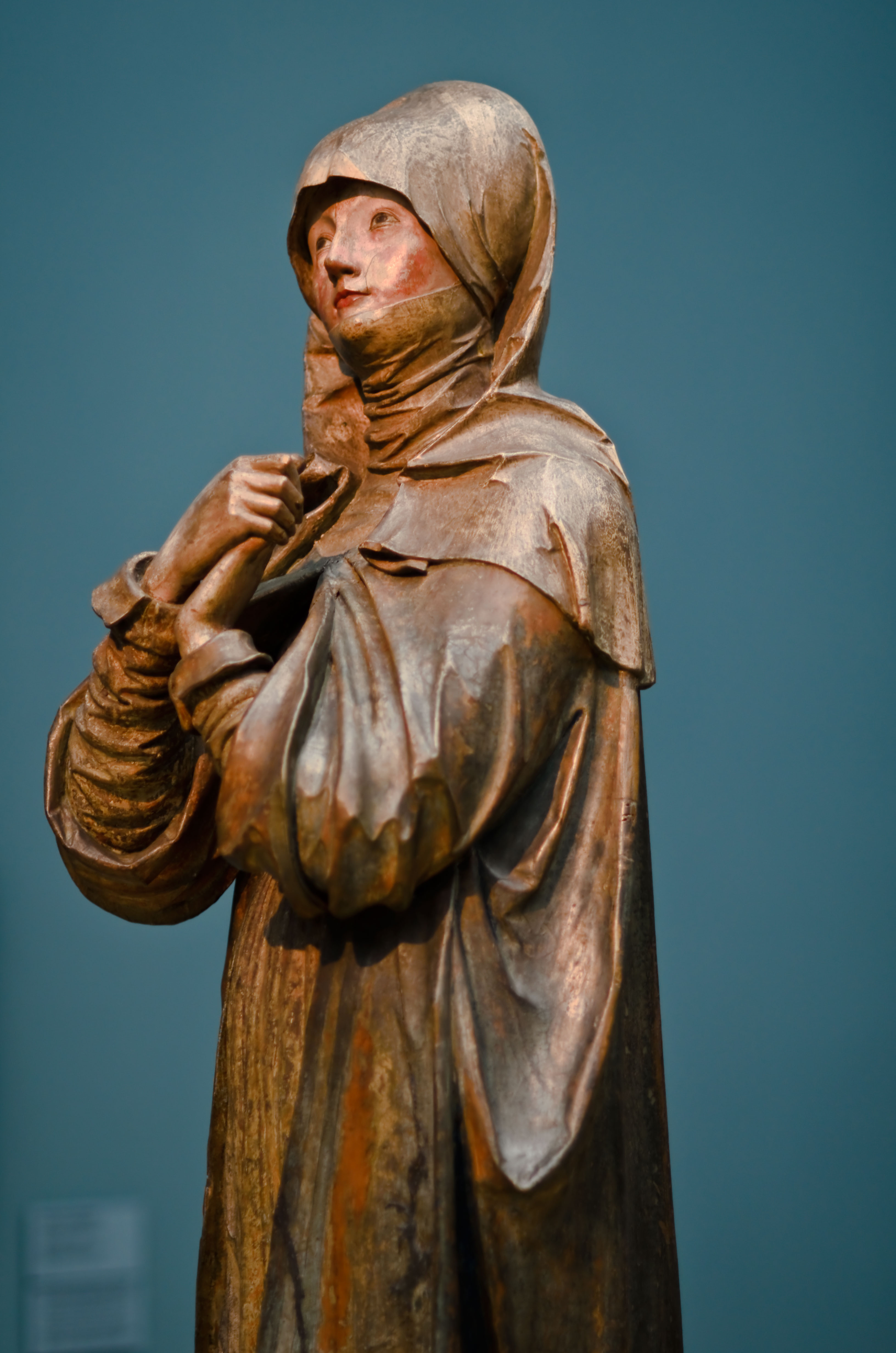
Nuremberg Madonna, c. 1550

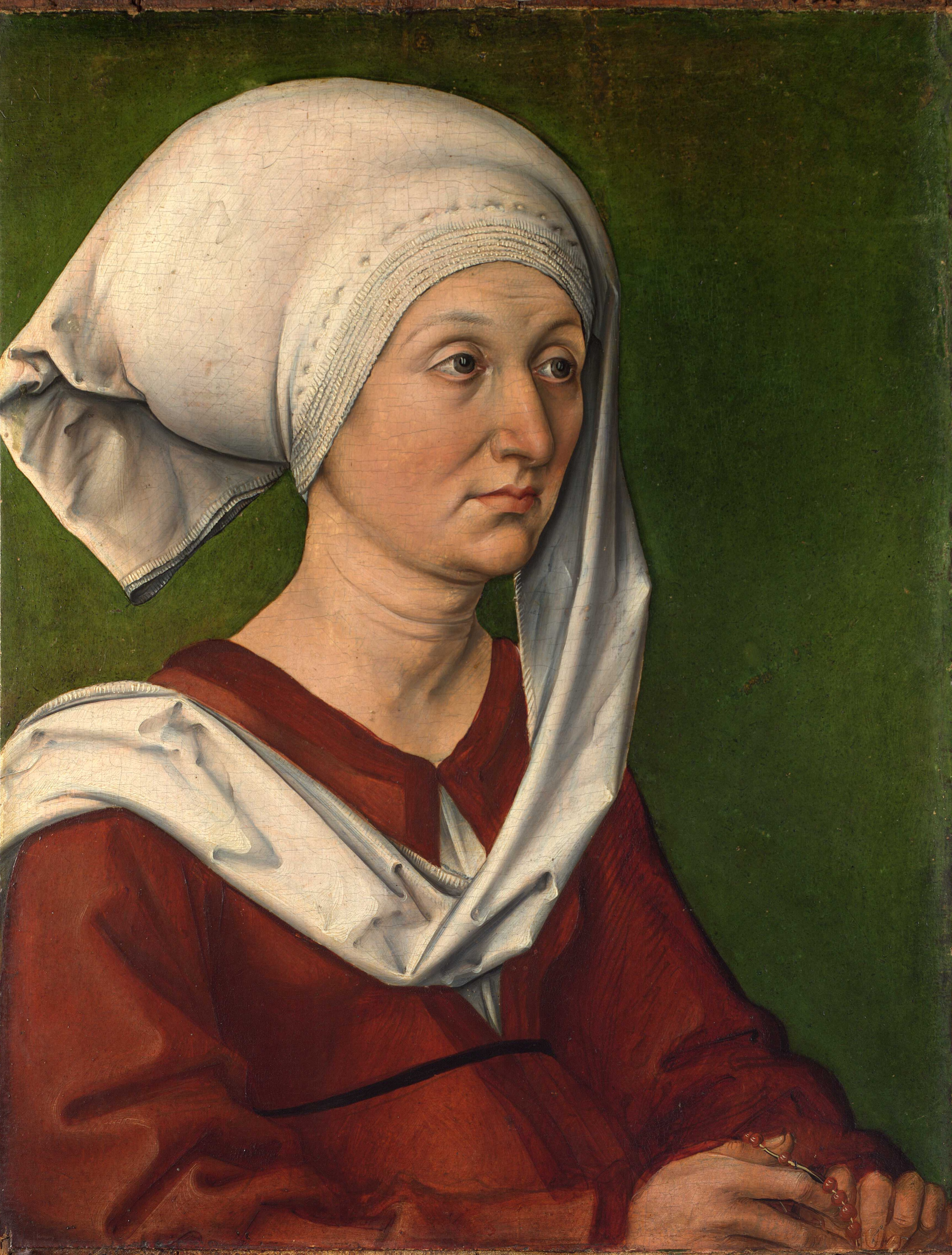
Portrait of Barbara Dürer, Albrecht's mother, c. 1490

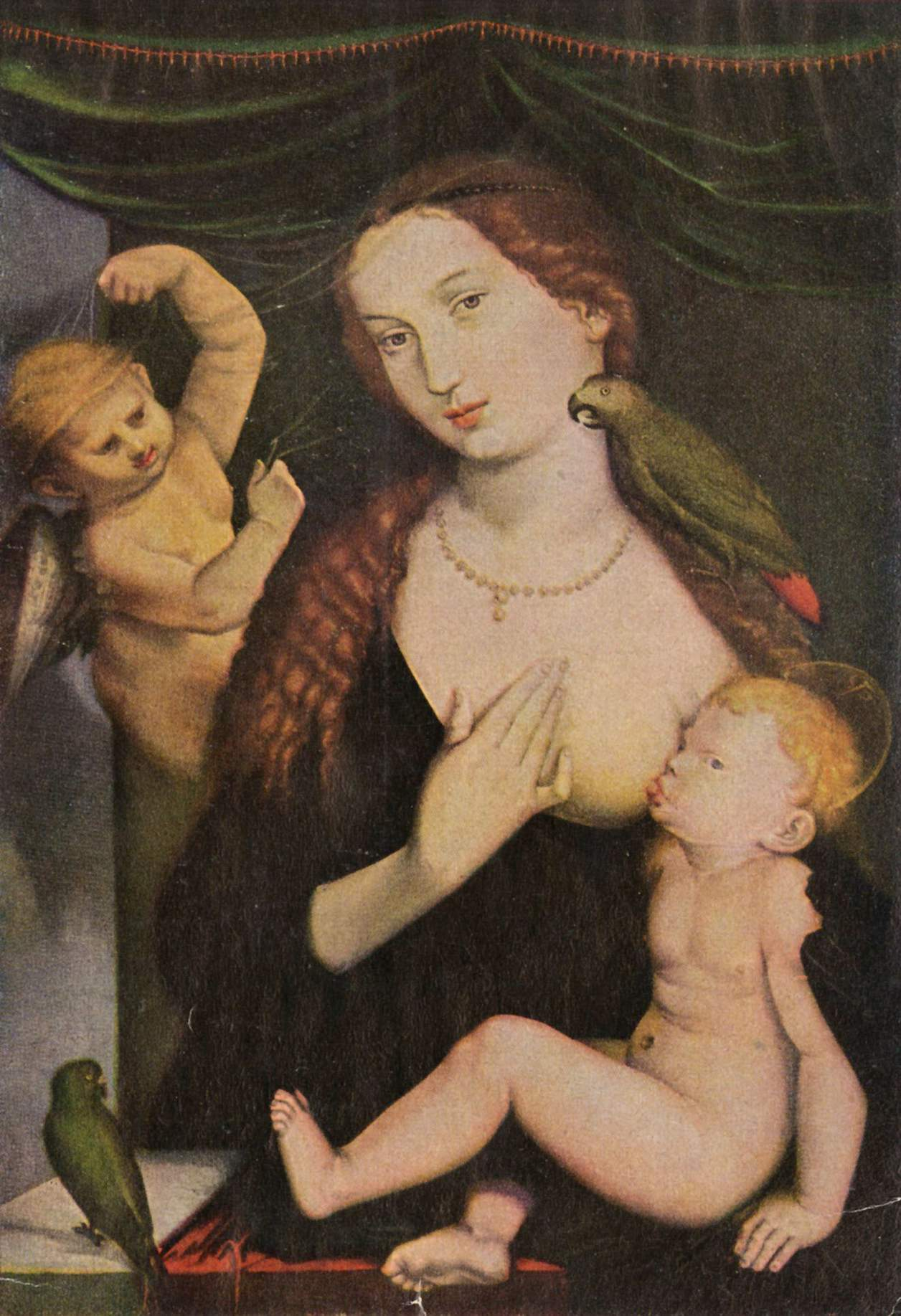
Madonna and Child with parrots, by Hans Baldung Grien, 1533

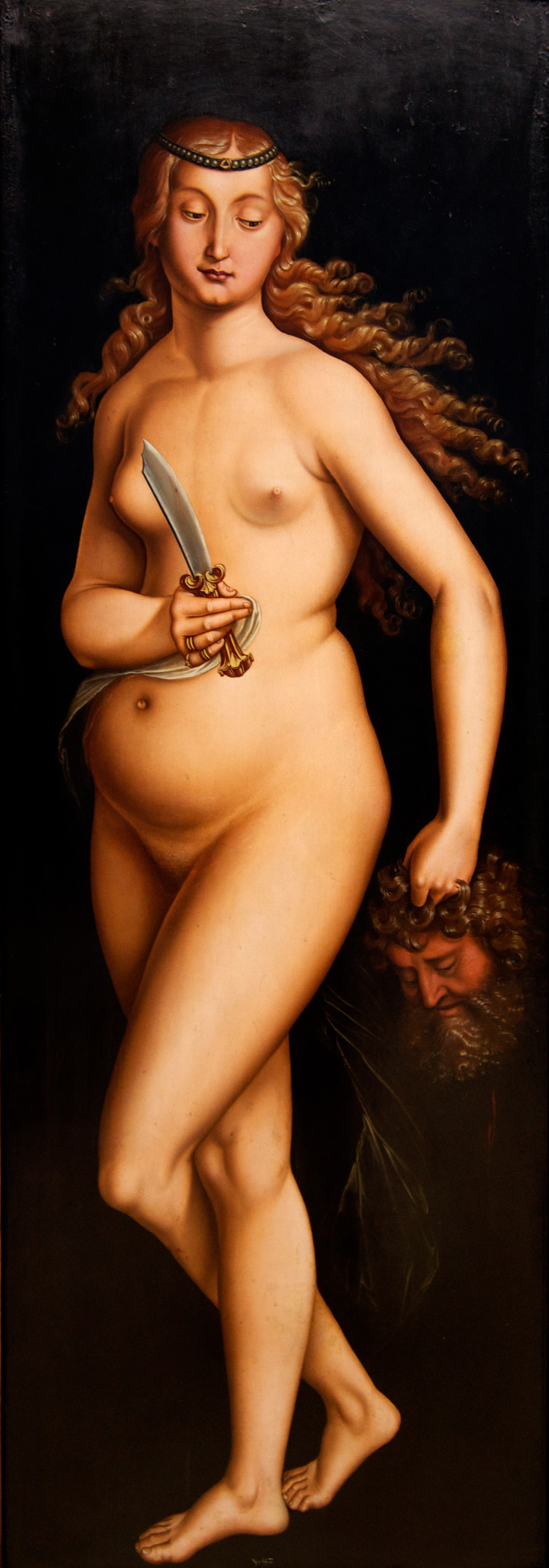
Judith with the Head of Holophernes, by Hans Baldung Grien, c. 1525

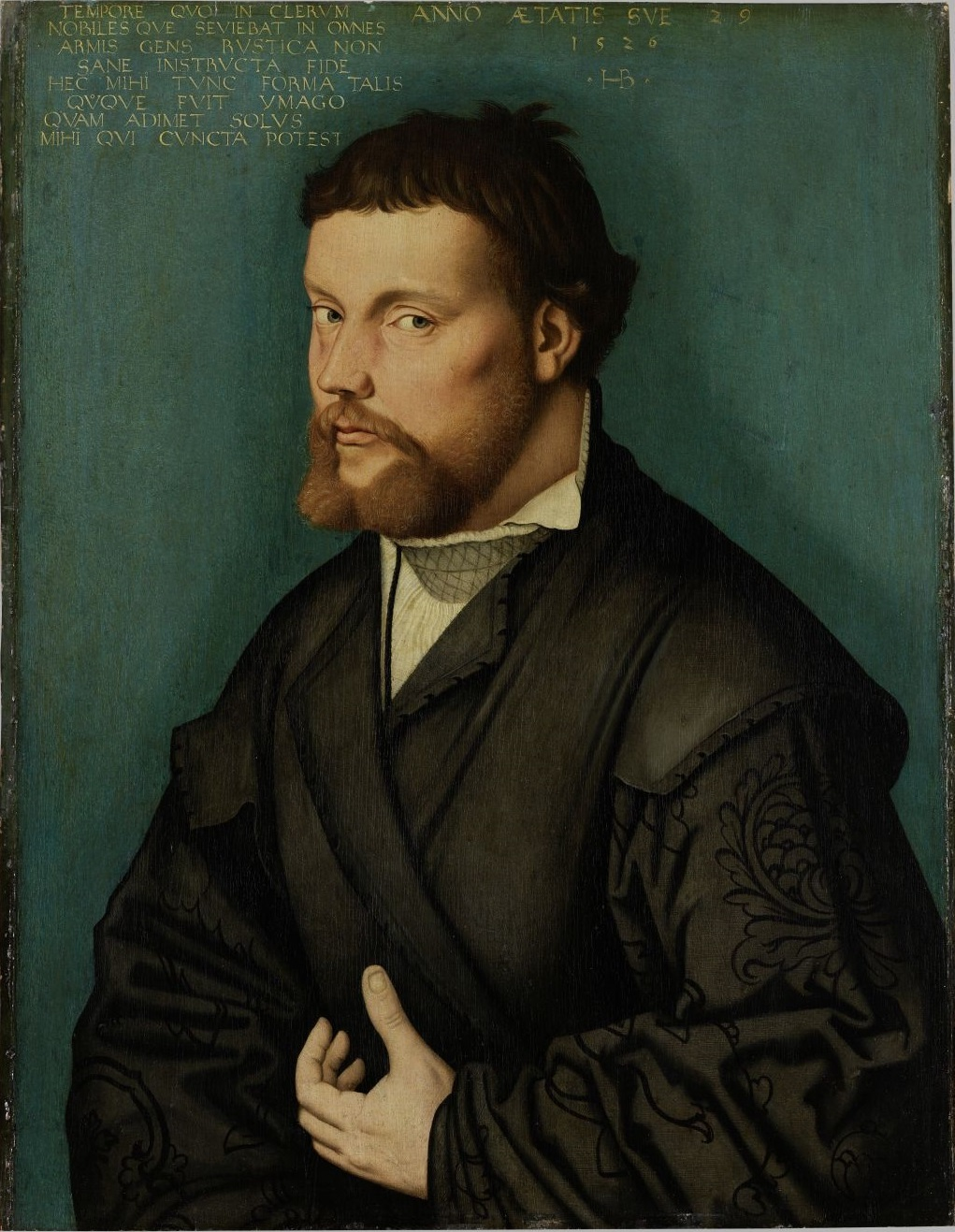
Portrait of a 29-Year-Old Man (Self-portrait ?) by Hans Baldung Grien, 1526

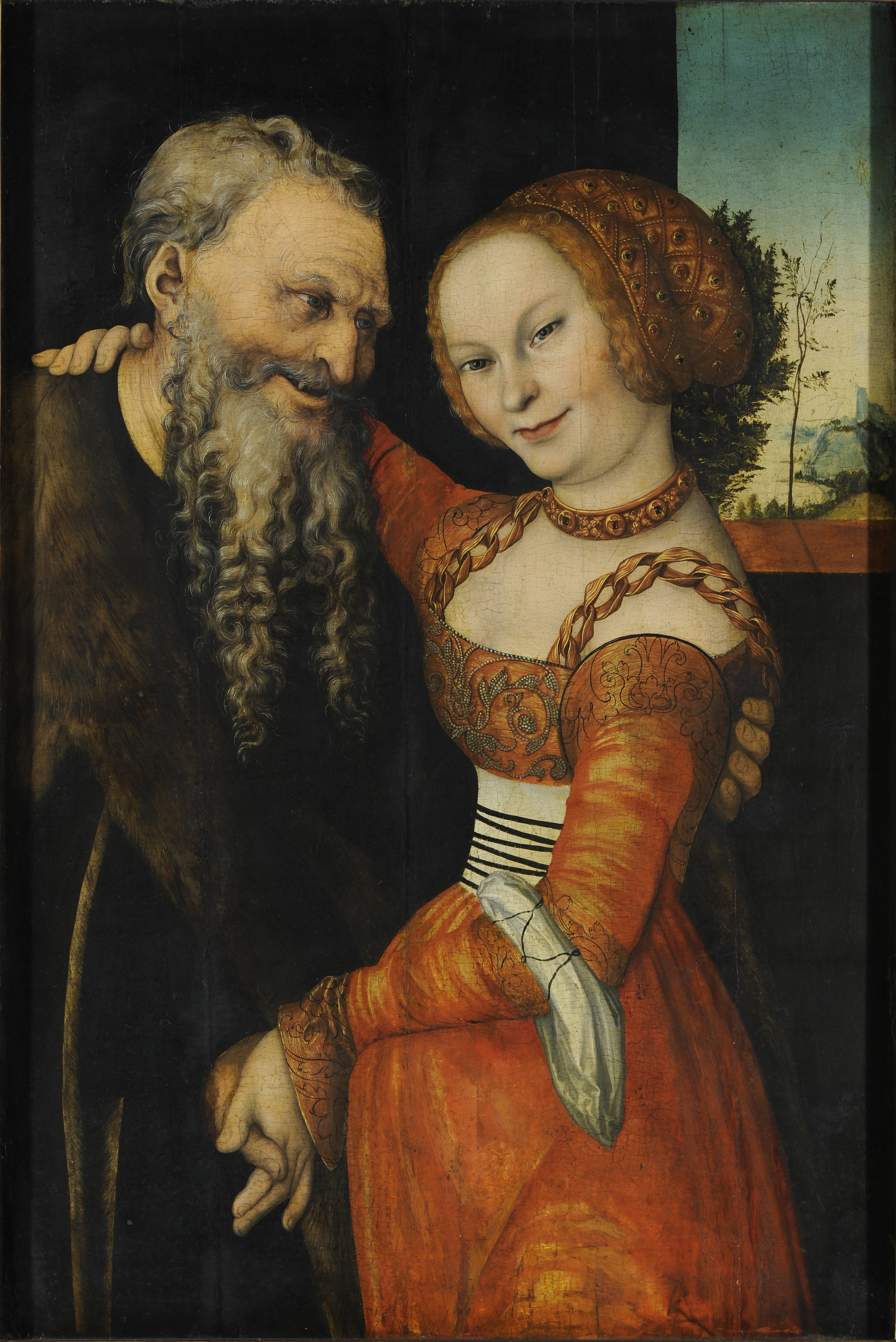
An ill-matched pair, by Lucas Cranach the Elder, c. 1530

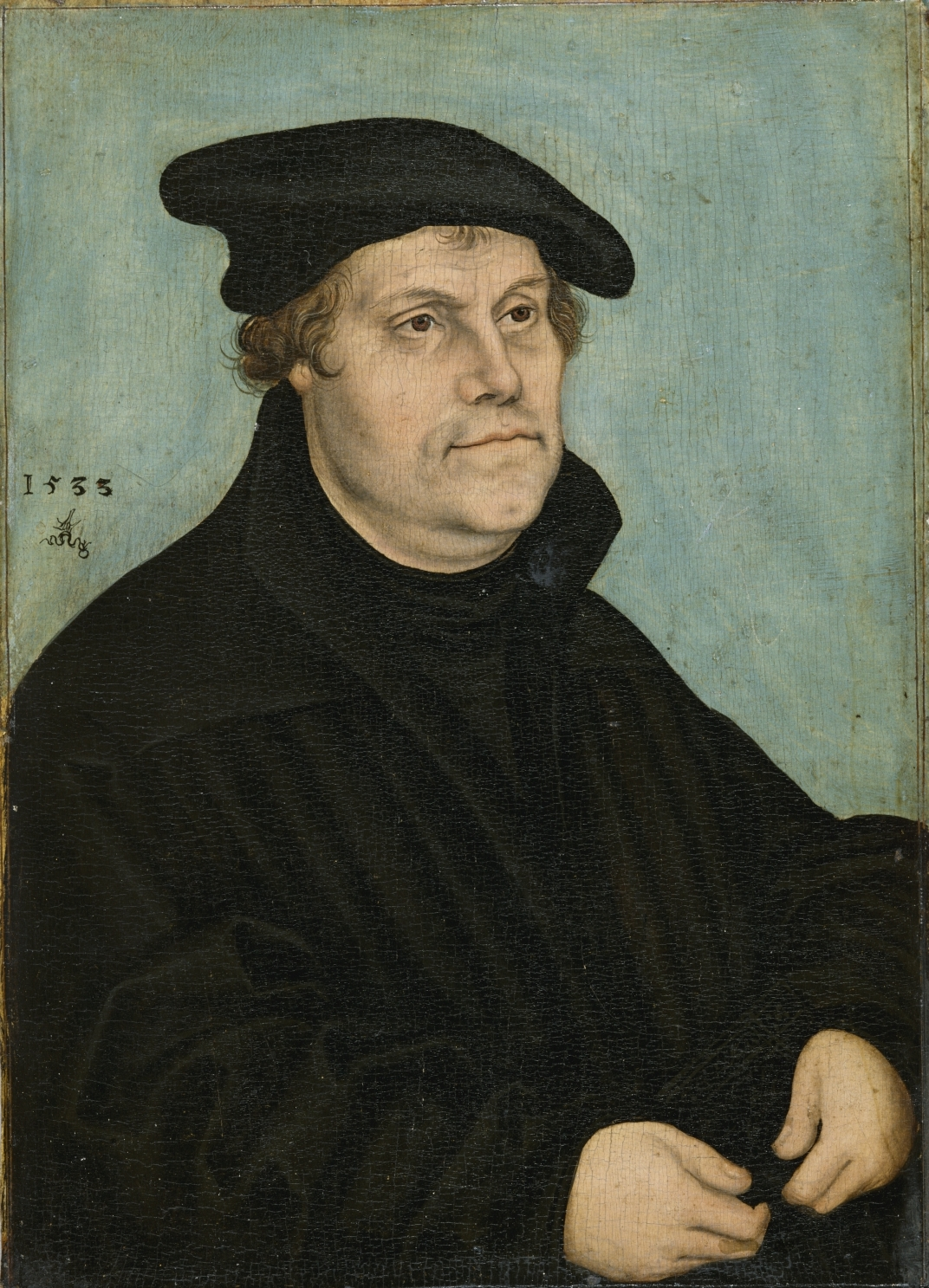
Martin Luther, by Lucas Cranach the Elder, 1533

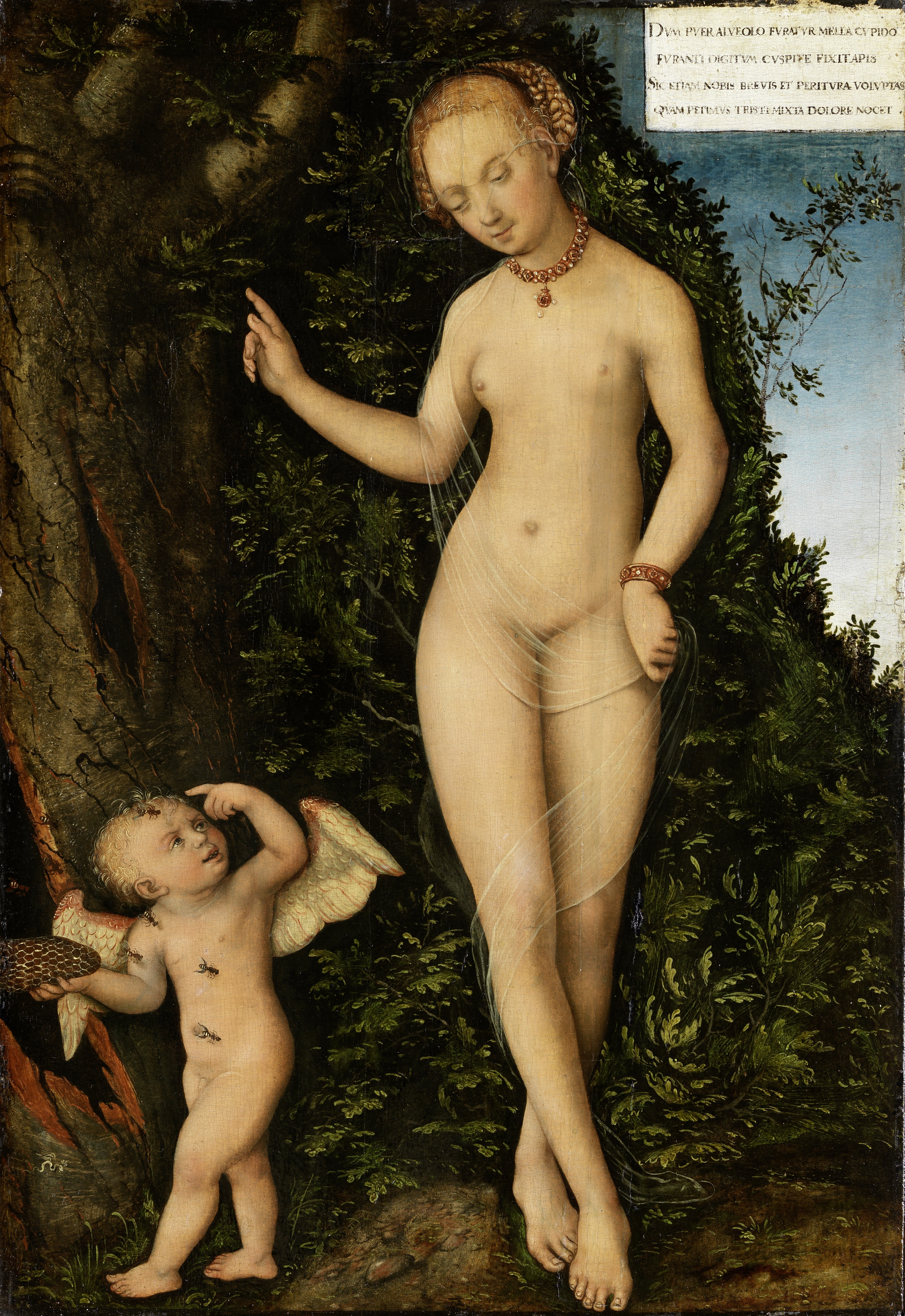
Venus and Cupid, the Honey Thief, by Lucas Cranach the Elder, c. 1537

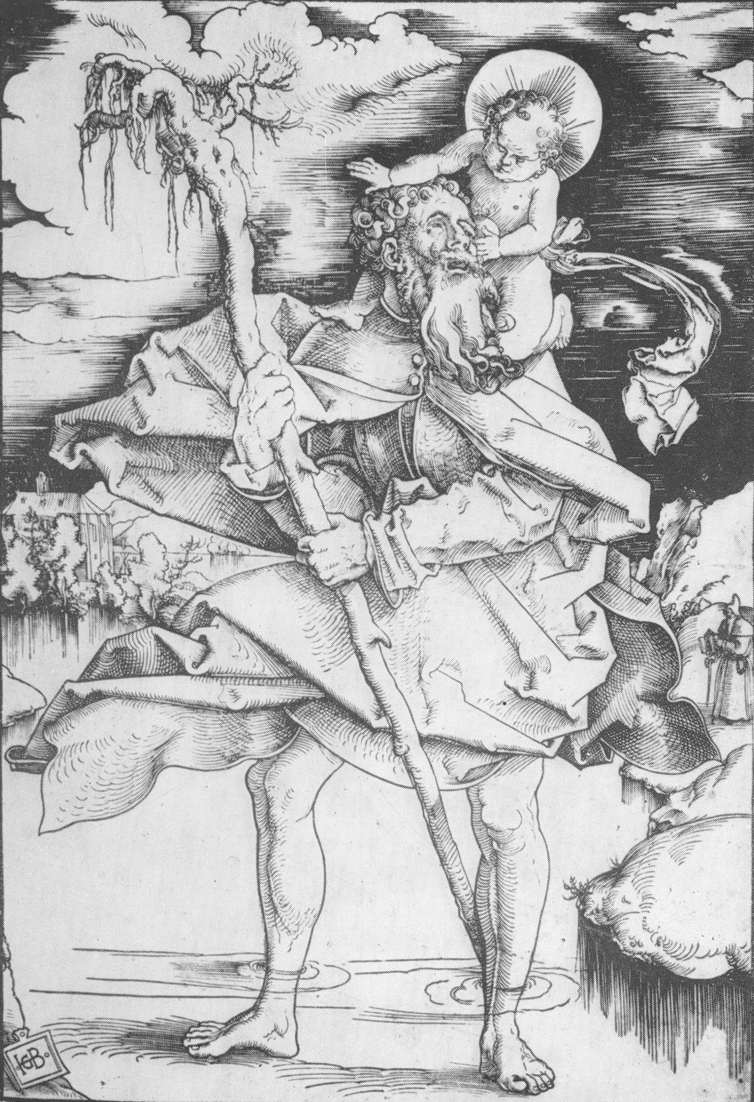
Saint Christopher, by Hans Baldung Grien, c. 1520

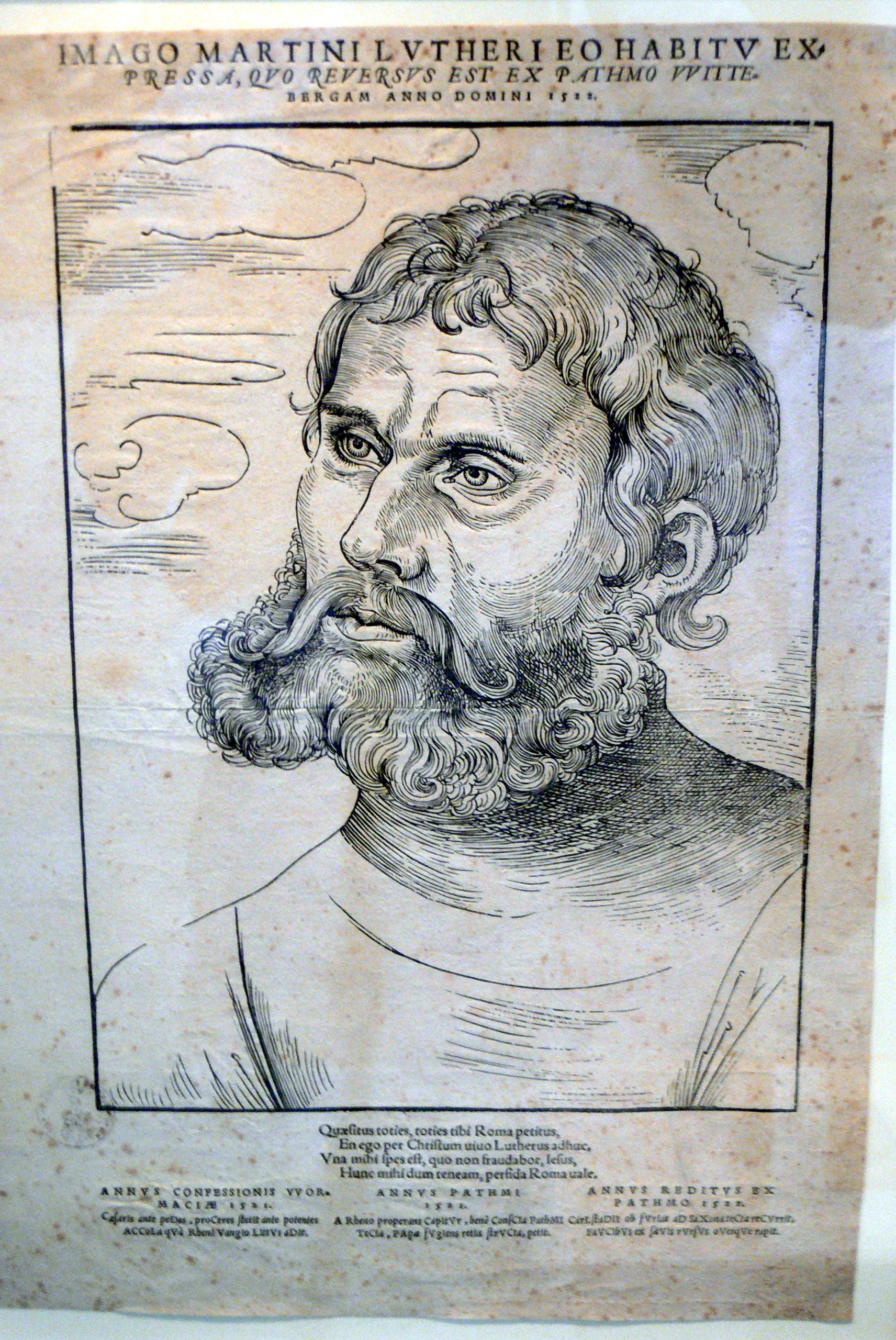
Martin Luther as Junker Jörg, woodcut by Lucas Cranach the Elder, 1522

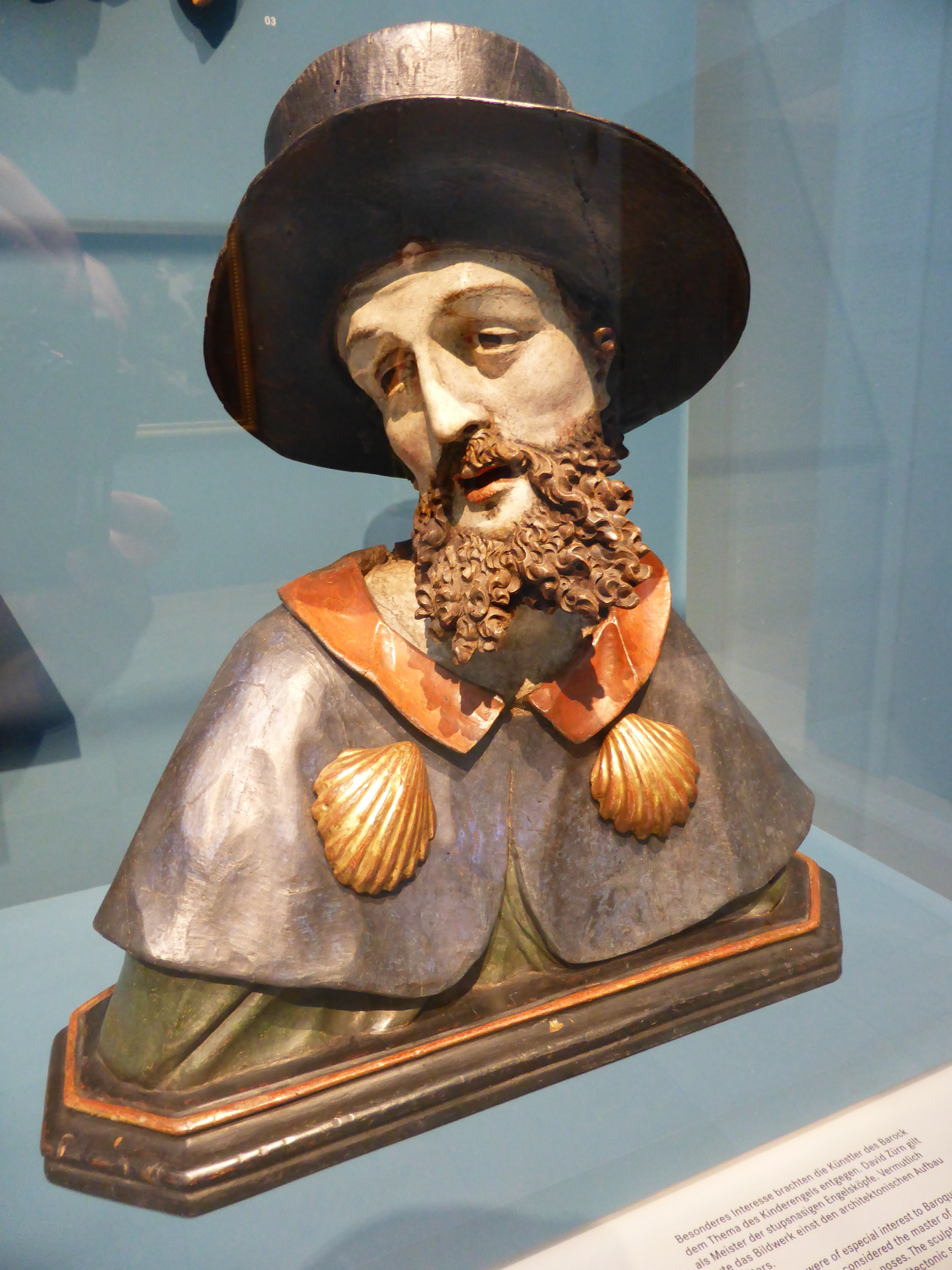
Saint James the Greater, by Hans Zürn the Elder, c. 1613

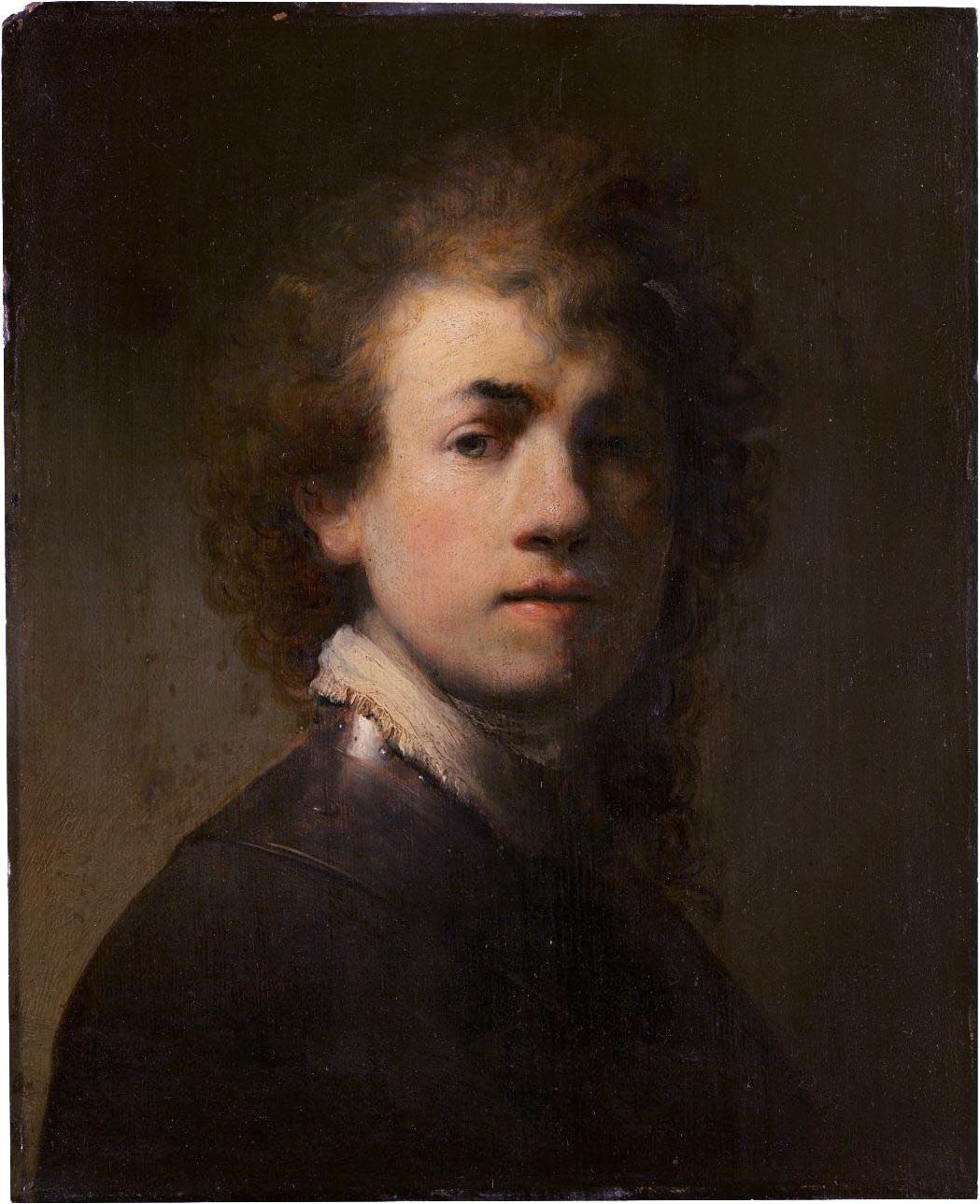
Self Portrait by Rembrandt, c. 1629

== Structure and organization ==
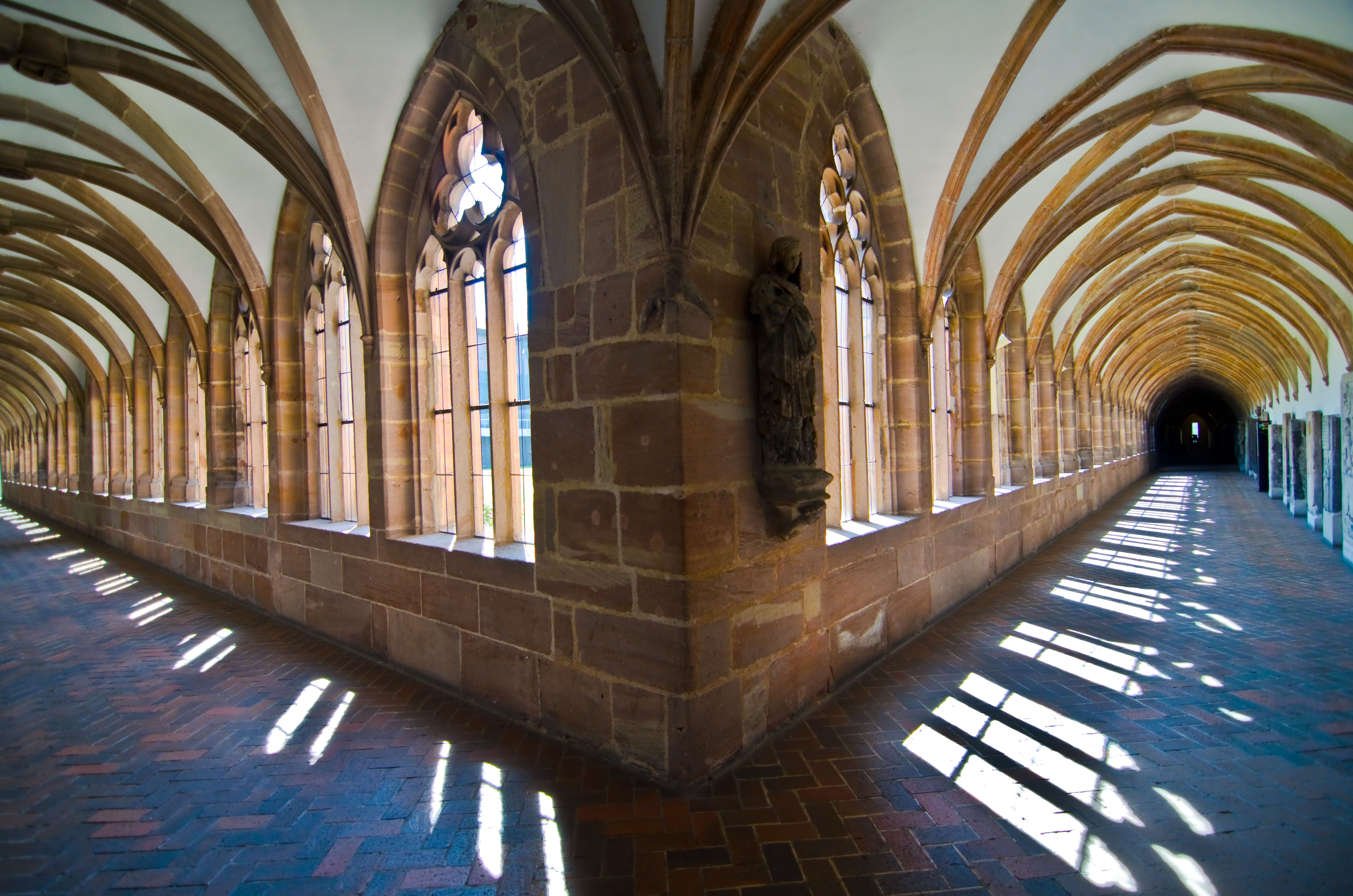
Grand Cloister of the former Carthusian monastery, today part of the museum buildings

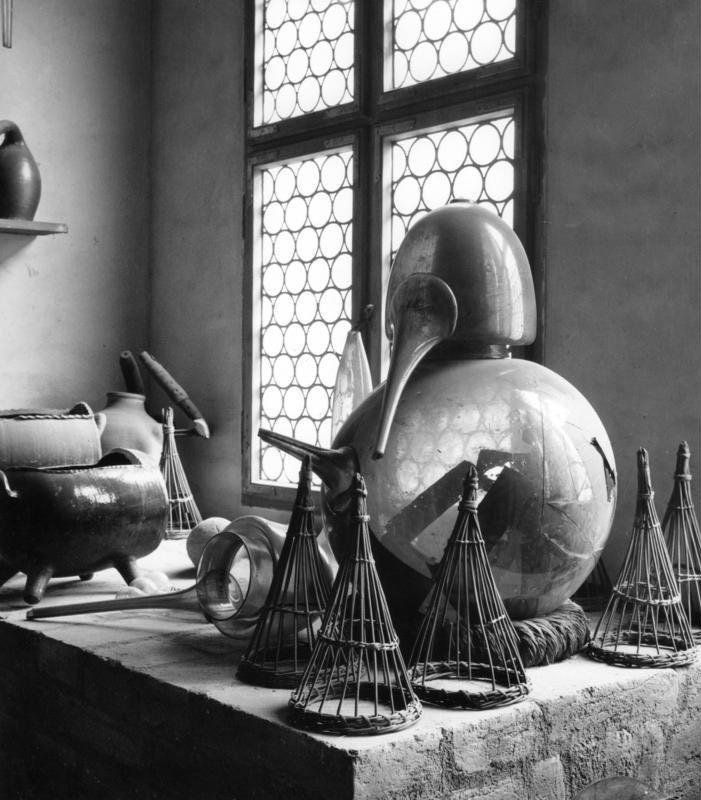
1954 image of an exhibit in the Nationalmuseum

The Germanisches Nationalmuseum is a public law foundation supported by the Federal Republic of Germany, the state of Bavaria and the city of Nuremberg. Its Administrative Board is chaired by Klaus-Dieter Lehmann, the head of the General Directorate is G. Ulrich Großmann (As of 2016).

Associated to the museum are Archives, like the German Archive of Art, libraries, a special department for restoration and conservation (Institut für Kunsttechnik und Konservierung) and an educational center. The museum also administers the Collection of Children's Toys at St. Lorenz's parish, the Museum of the Emperor's Castle at Nuremberg Castle, as well as the Neunhof Palace, a Manor house located north of Nuremberg with its collection of hunting weapons and tools. The museum is organized as a public foundation since 1921. Since 2 July 1954, companies and individual persons (the "Fördererkreis") are invited to support the museum's activities.

As a research institute, the GNM conducts scientific and historical research on the material provided in the collections and archives. The research results are made public in scientific journals and exhibitions. Different long-time research projects are ongoing at the museum, including the "Schrifttum zur Deutschen Kunst" (German Art Literature project), and the Hessian Renaissance Stately Homes Online Catalogue.
