= Bruno Weber Park =

Sculpture park in Switzerland

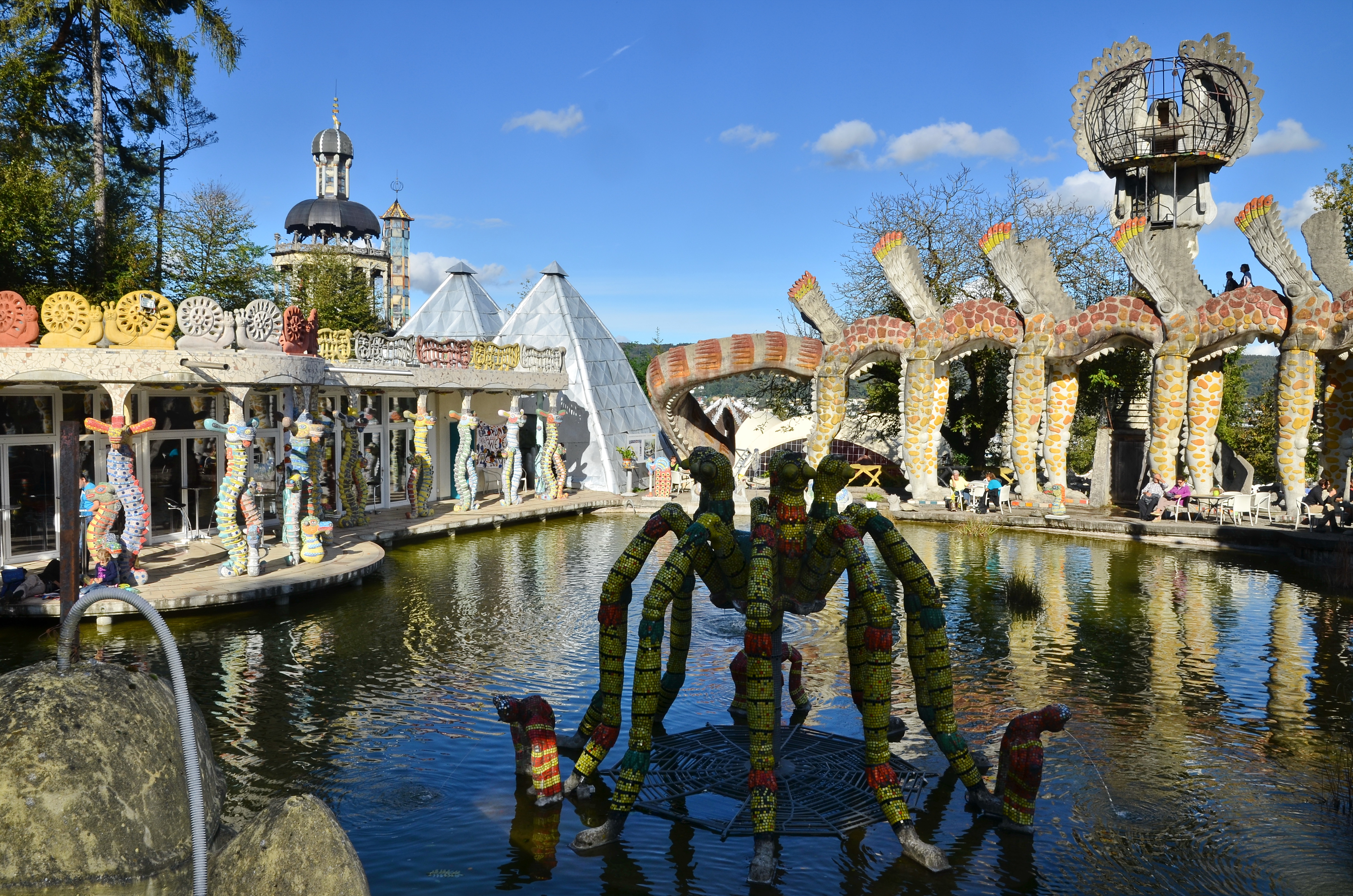
- Bruno Weber Park Wassergarten, Wassergartenhaus and Flügelhund; the villa is situated to the left, the tower and entrance to the right.

- Location within Switzerland
- Established: 1962
- Location: Dietikon and Spreitenbach, Cantons of Zürich and Aargau, Switzerland
- Coordinates: 47.404948°N 8.380599°E
- Type: Indoor/outdoor sculpture park, Gesamtkunstwerk related to Bruno Weber
- Visitors: 20,000 (2014)
- Director: Kristiina D'Agosta
- Curator: Maria Anna Weber-Godon
- Public transit access: Dietikon railway station: S11 (ZVV) and S12 (ZVV)
- Website: https://weberpark.ch/

Aerial first-person fly-through of Bruno Weber Park.

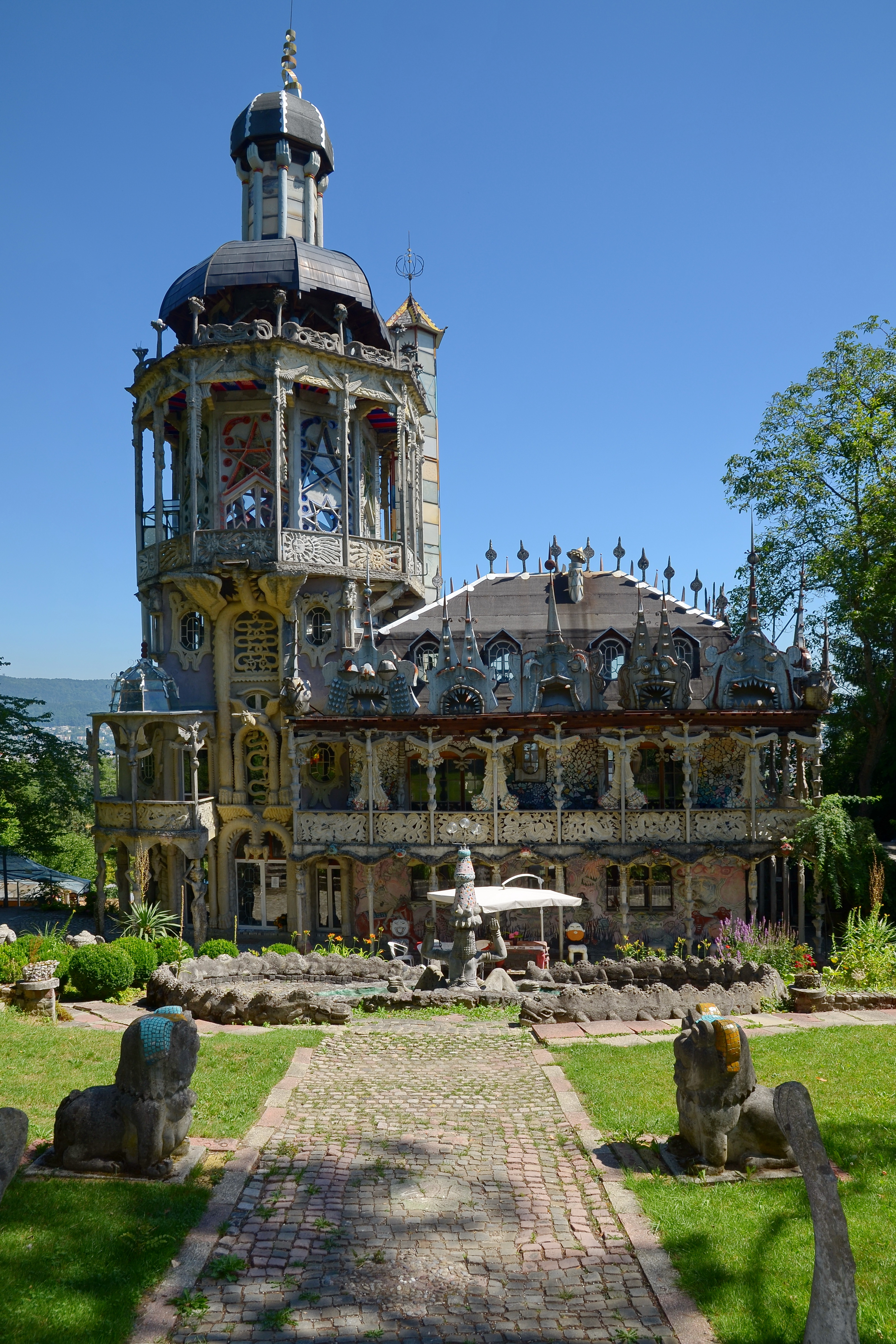
The villa of the Bruno Weber Park, home of Bruno Weber

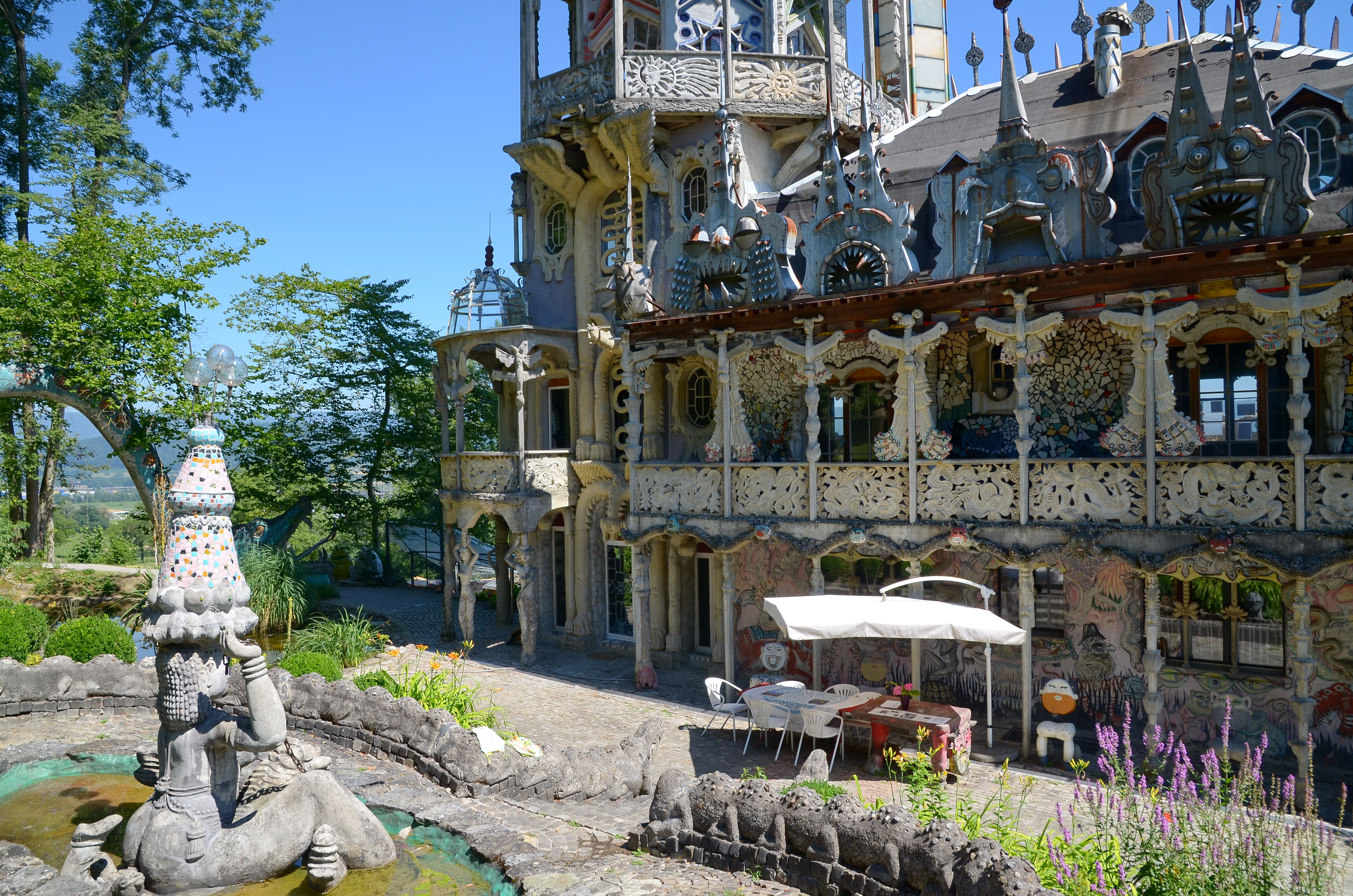

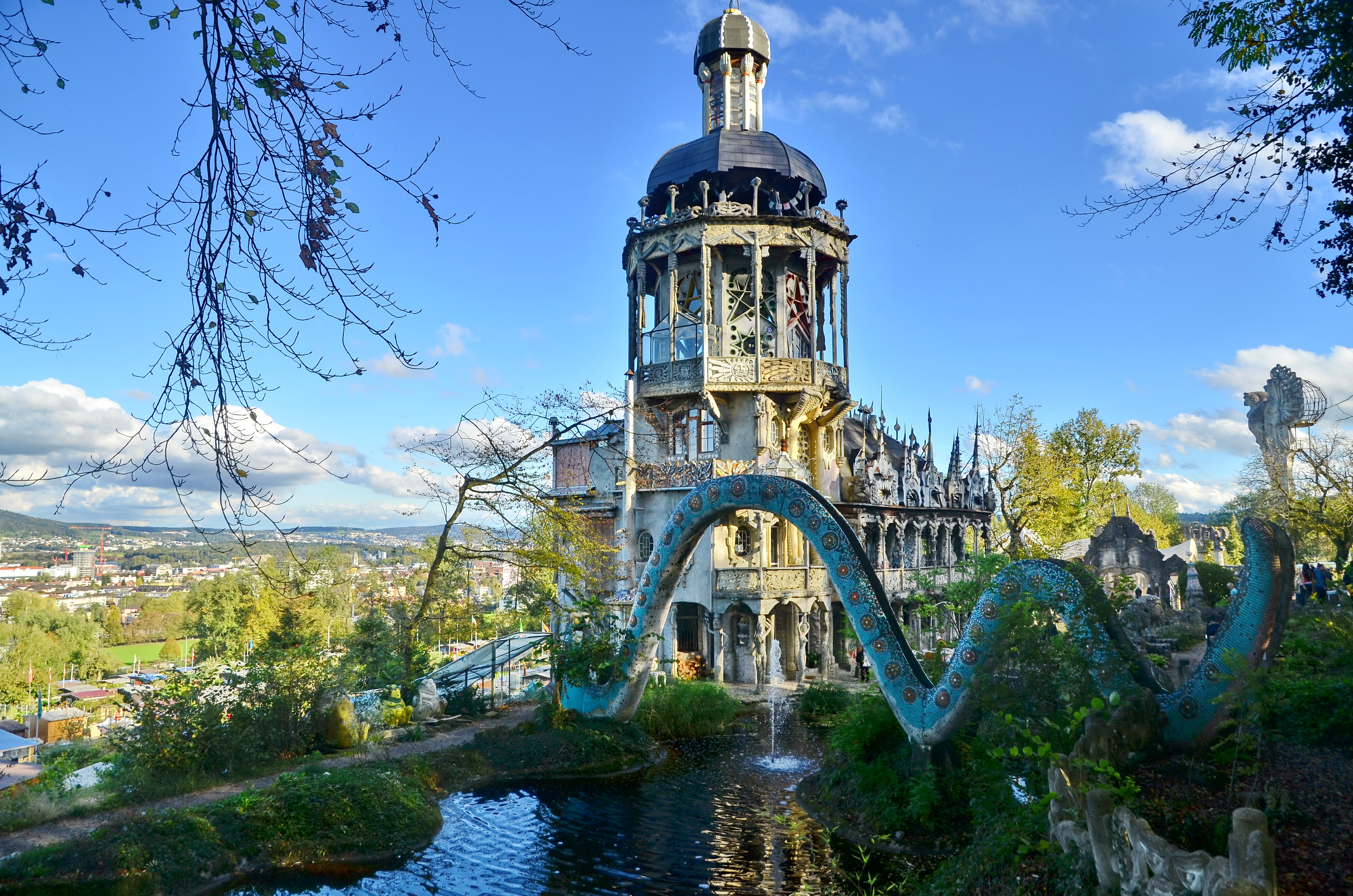
"snake bridge" crossing the pond in the park, the villa's tower in the background

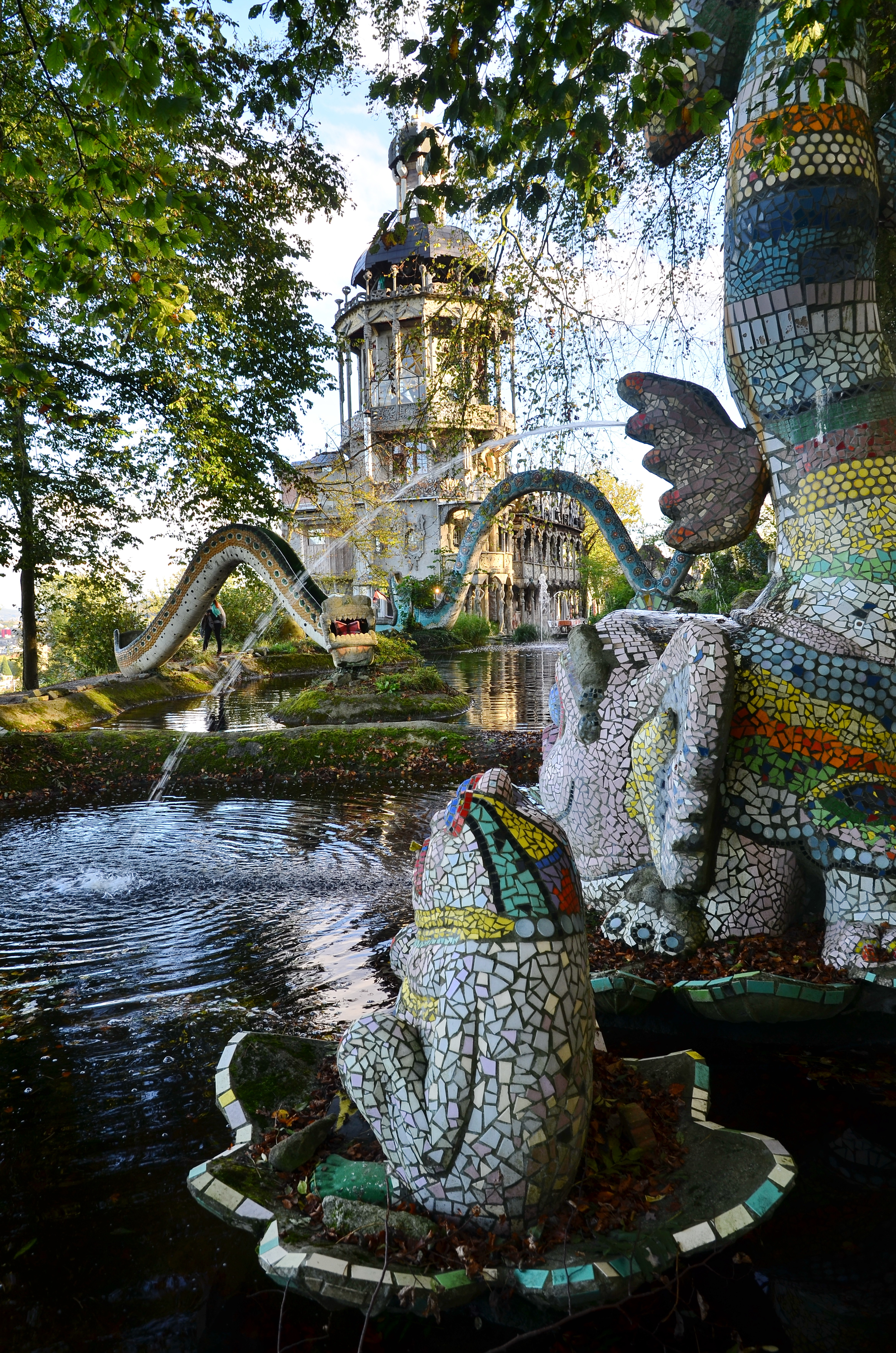

Bruno Weber Park is a sculpture park in the Swiss municipalities Spreitenbach and Dietikon, and besides the Fahr Abbey one of the visitor attractions in the Limmat Valley. The sculpture garden is designed as a Gesamtkunstwerk of the Swiss artist Bruno Weber (1931–2011).

== Architecture ==
The park covers an area of 20,000 m^{2} (220,000 sq ft) and has been extended on the grounds of the former estate of Bruno Weber's parent. Over the years, it was decorated with dozens of columns, reliefs, heads and gargoyles. A 12-metre-high (39 ft) tower at the entrance area and the estate tower were also built, being landmarks overlooking the Limmat Valley. The family's estate was rebuilt in a "fairy-tale castle", with colourful mosaics and decorated animal sculptures. The Wassergarten was opened in May 2012 and is surrounded by two 100-metre-long (330 ft) "wing dogs" (Flügelhund) forming a footbridge, including a ballroom for events to the west. The Crawler is still not really finished, as well as the biggest project that previously existed only on paper: three oversized caterpillars in the water garden room. A few years ago, the ETH Zurich faculty prepared a feasibility study, but it was still not realised.

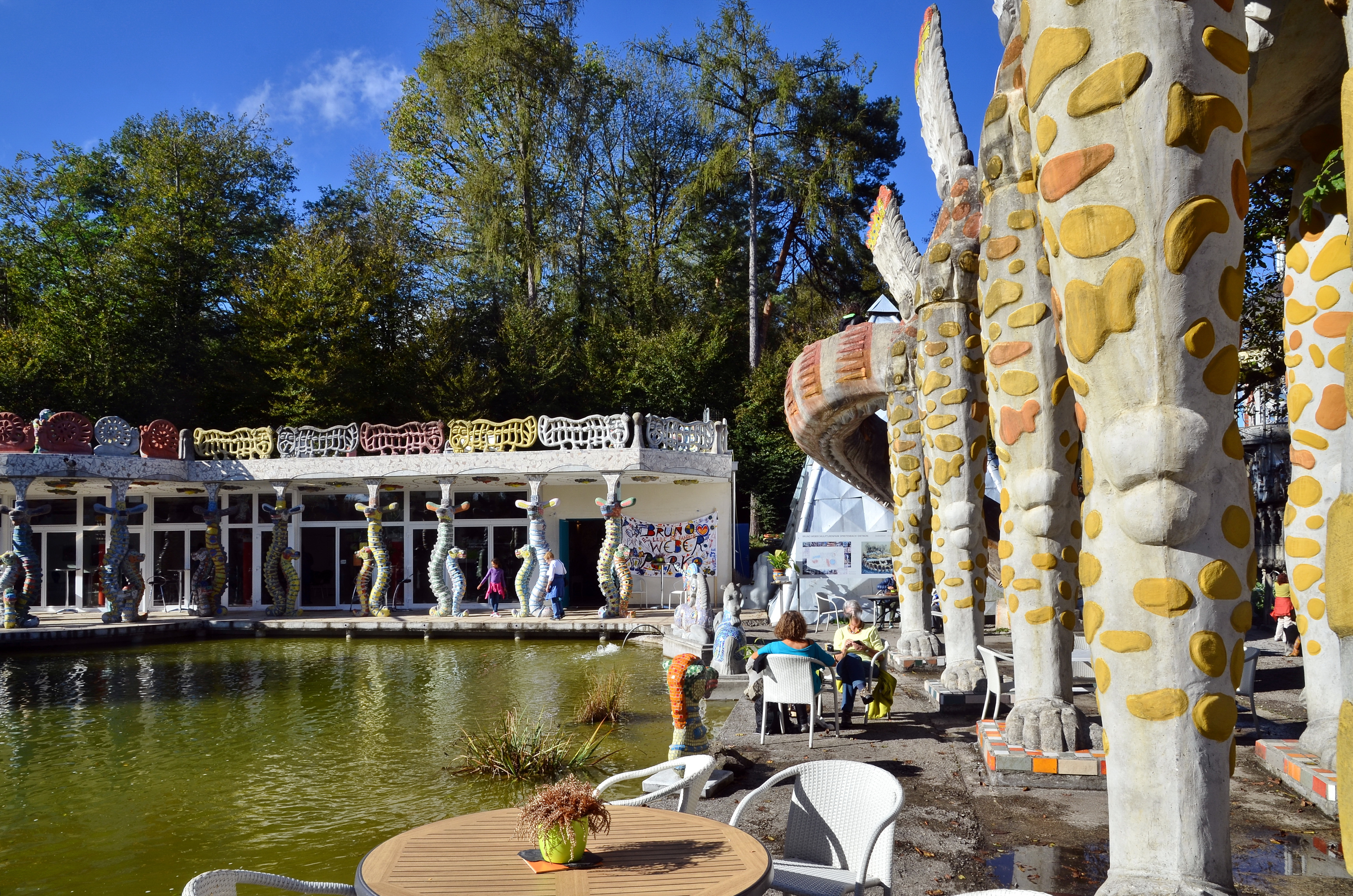
water garden building

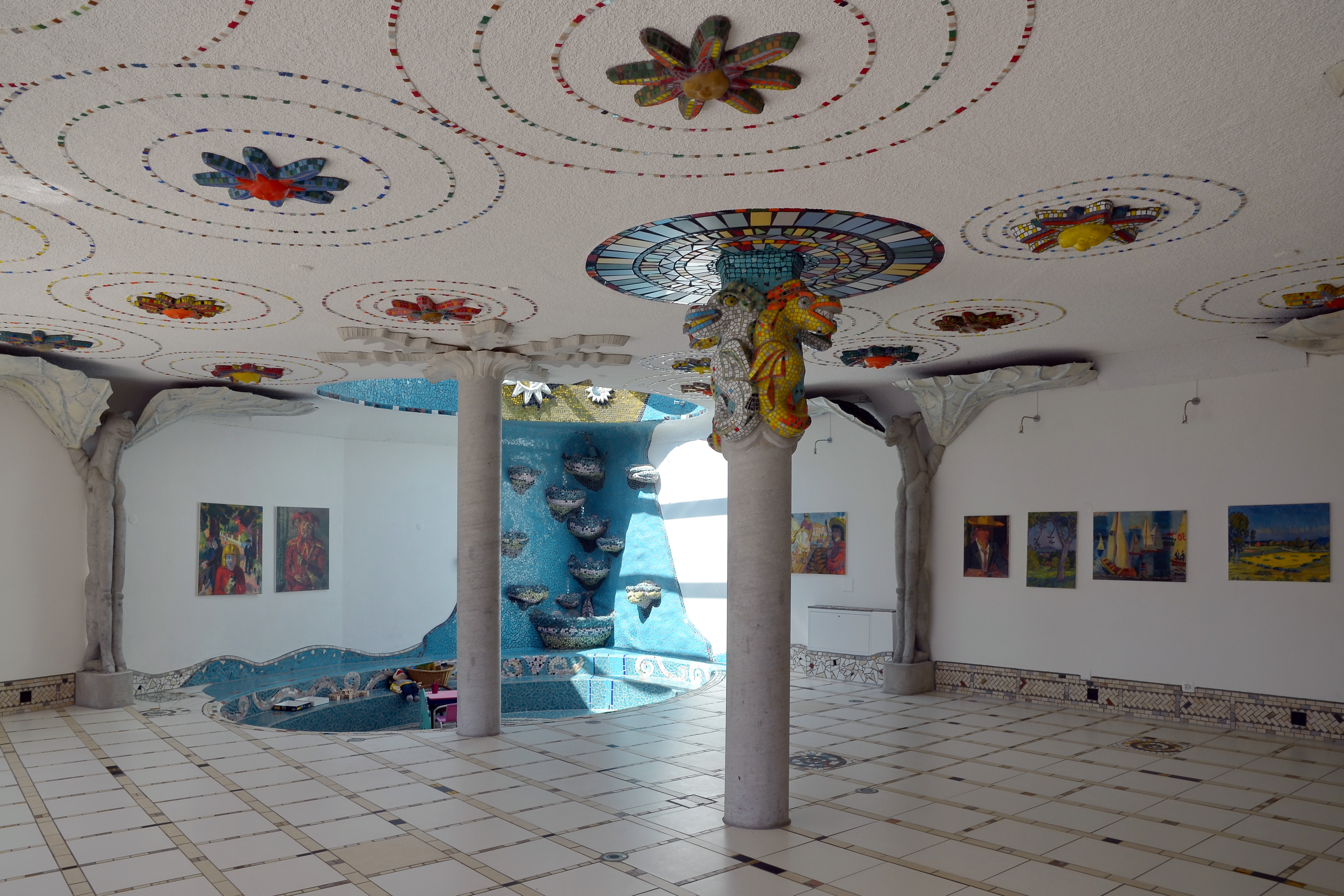
interior

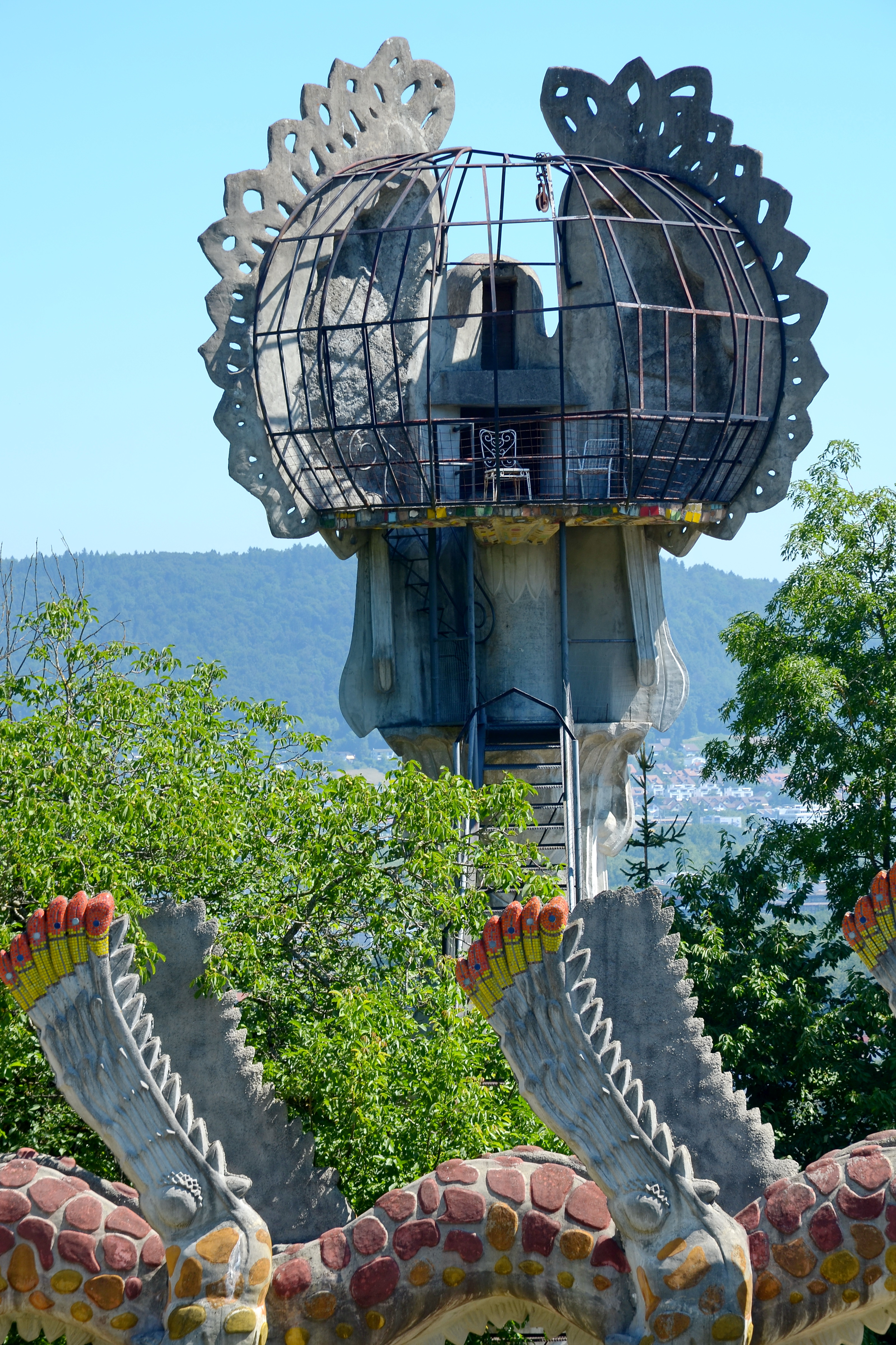
tower

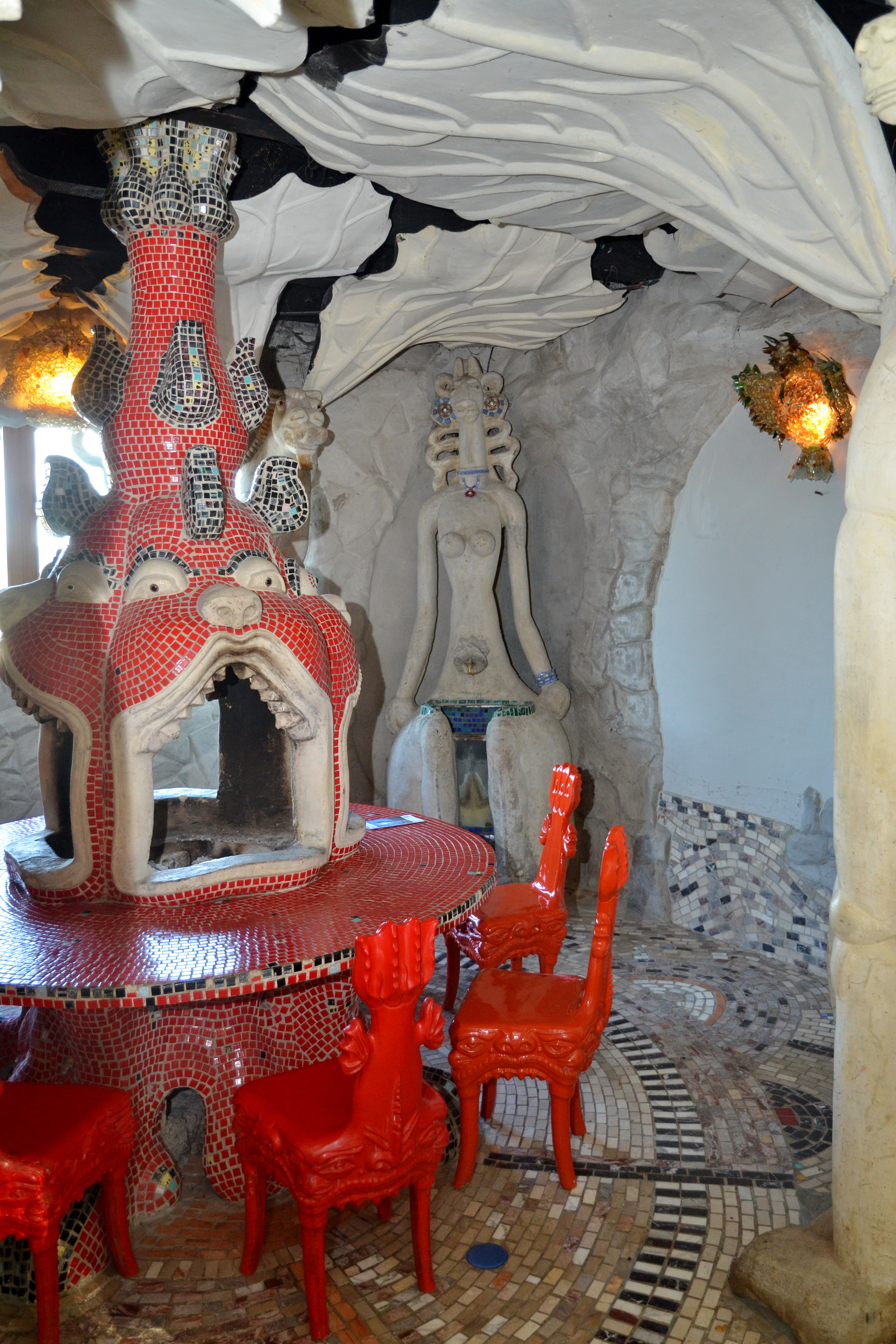
the villa's interior

Although Bruno Weber began his artistic career as a painter and graphic artist, he is best known for his concrete sculptures that are some of the main attractions of the park. Since 1966, that material started to dominate his future work, because only concrete allowed Bruno Weber to realise his impressive visions. In addition, the choice of that material is closely related to the construction activity in the Limmat Valley as a kind of counterpoint; the same material was used for many apartment blocks that were built in the valley in the 1960s and 1970s. Two dragon figures (one male and one female specimen) mark the entrance into the magic forest across from the Webers' family house. That sculpture treats a motif running through Weber's entire work – the balance between woman and man. The dragon gate in the sculpture park is the prototype of the so-called Drachentor sculpture, which represented Switzerland at the World Expo 1992 in Seville. The first stones in the sculpture park, however, were already laid, as Weber Antoni saw Gaudí's Park Güell in Barcelona for the first time.

Also, thousands of mosaic tiles adorn the sculptures of Bruno Weber. At the estate's own water source, opposite the Weber house, in the early 1970s, the artist built a fountain called the Source Goddess. It is one of the first concrete sculptures made by Weber, and he called it "his Indian character".

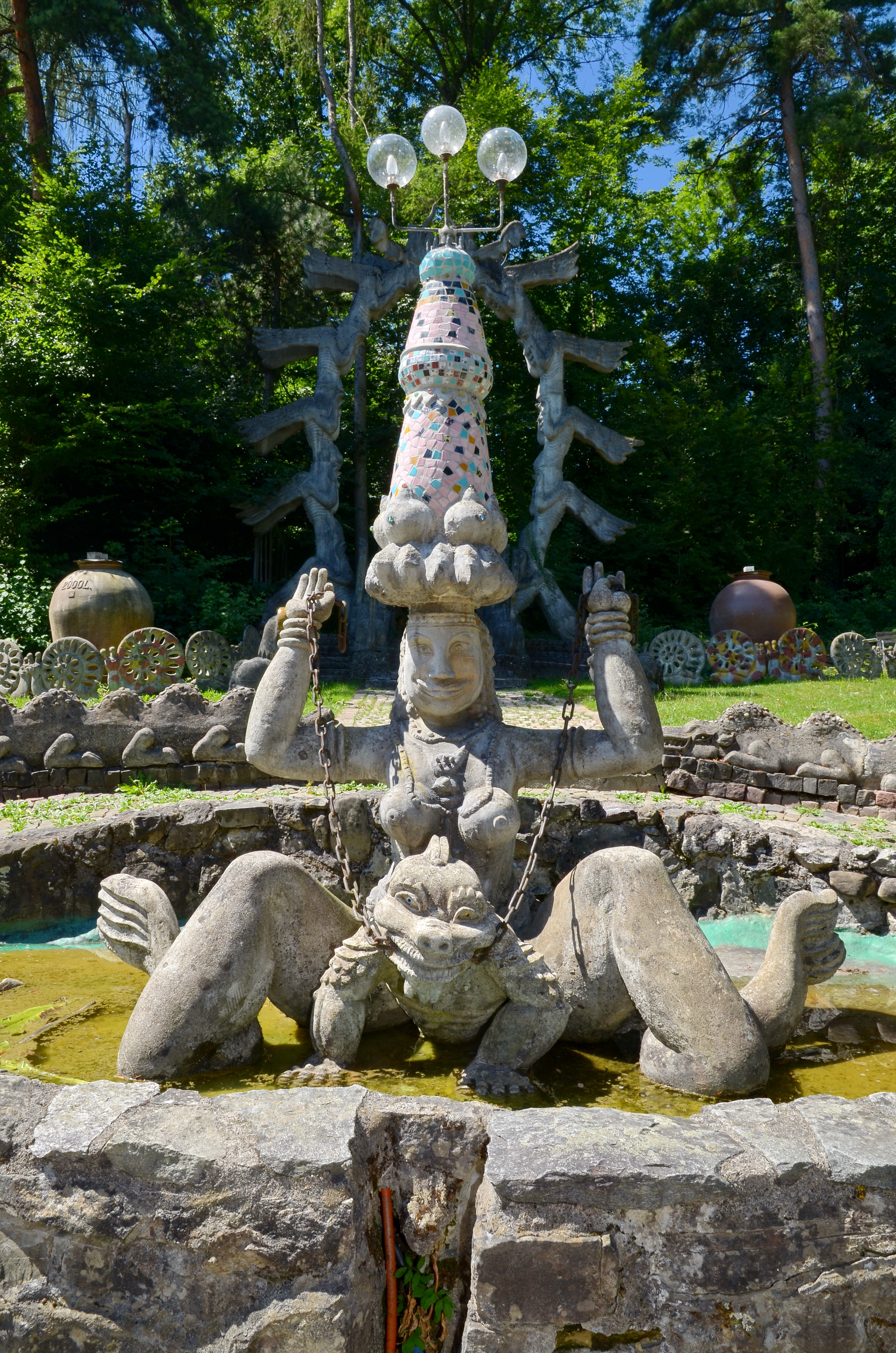
Indian water well Goddess

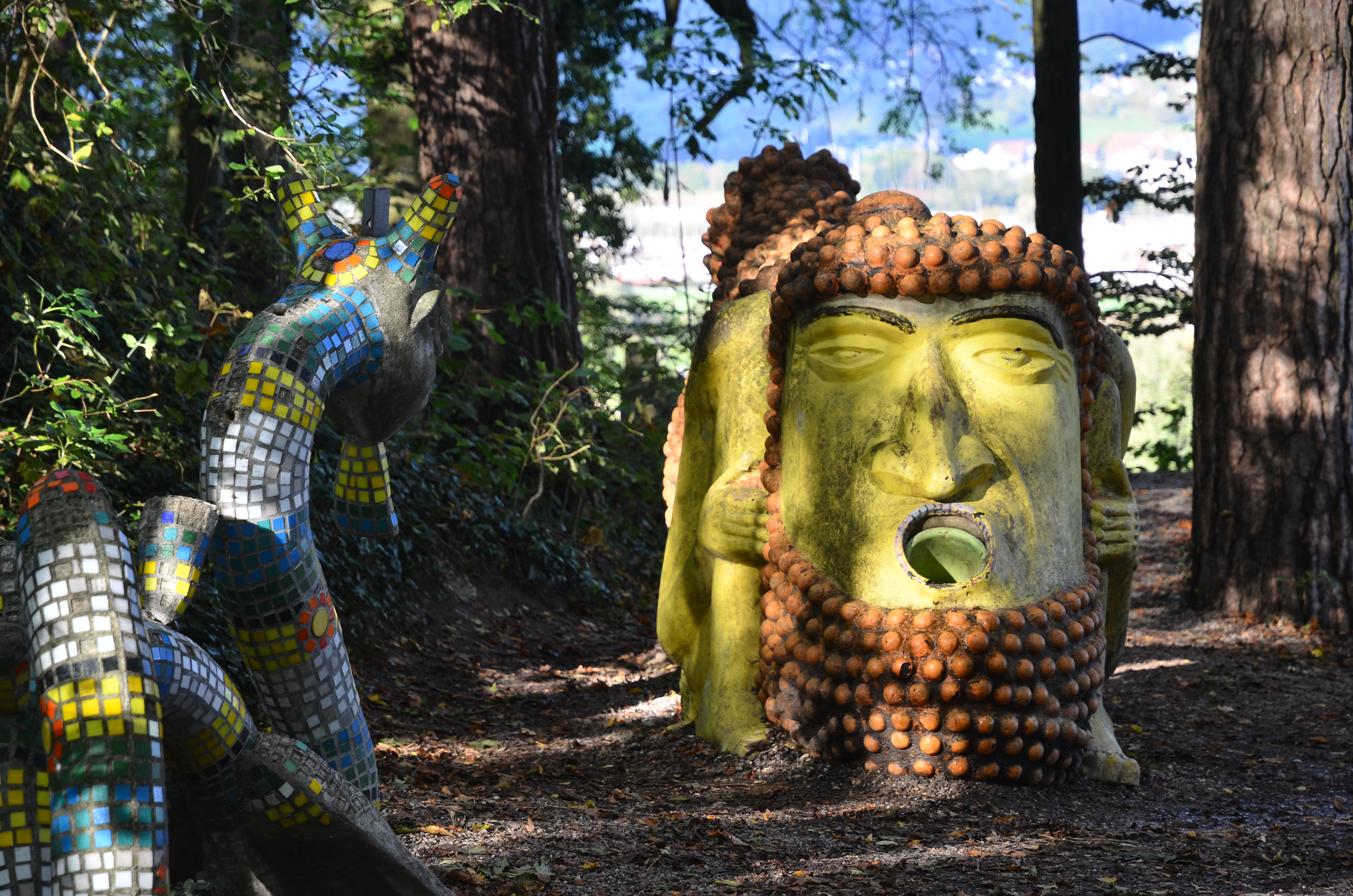
magic forest

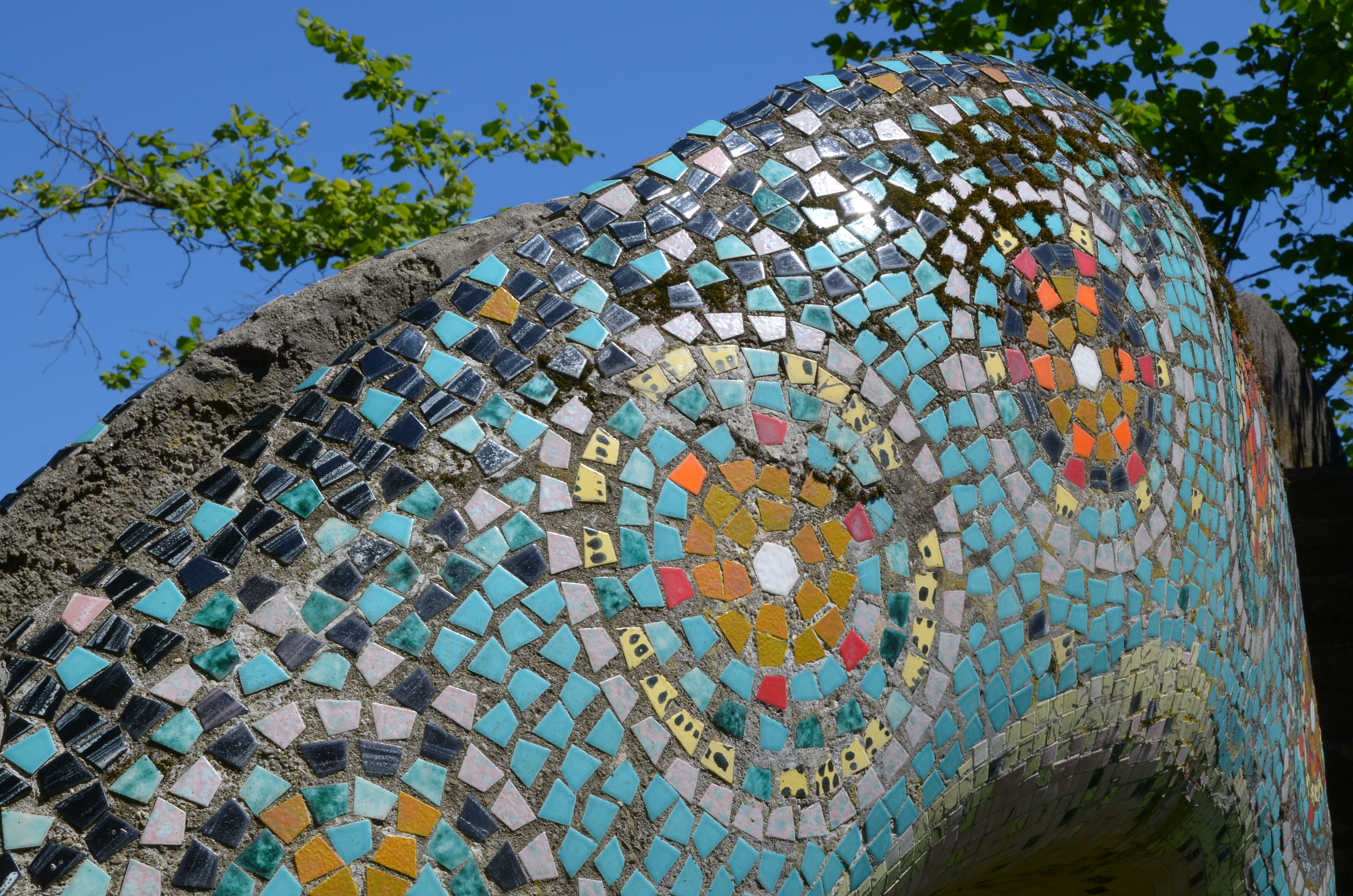
mosaic tiles

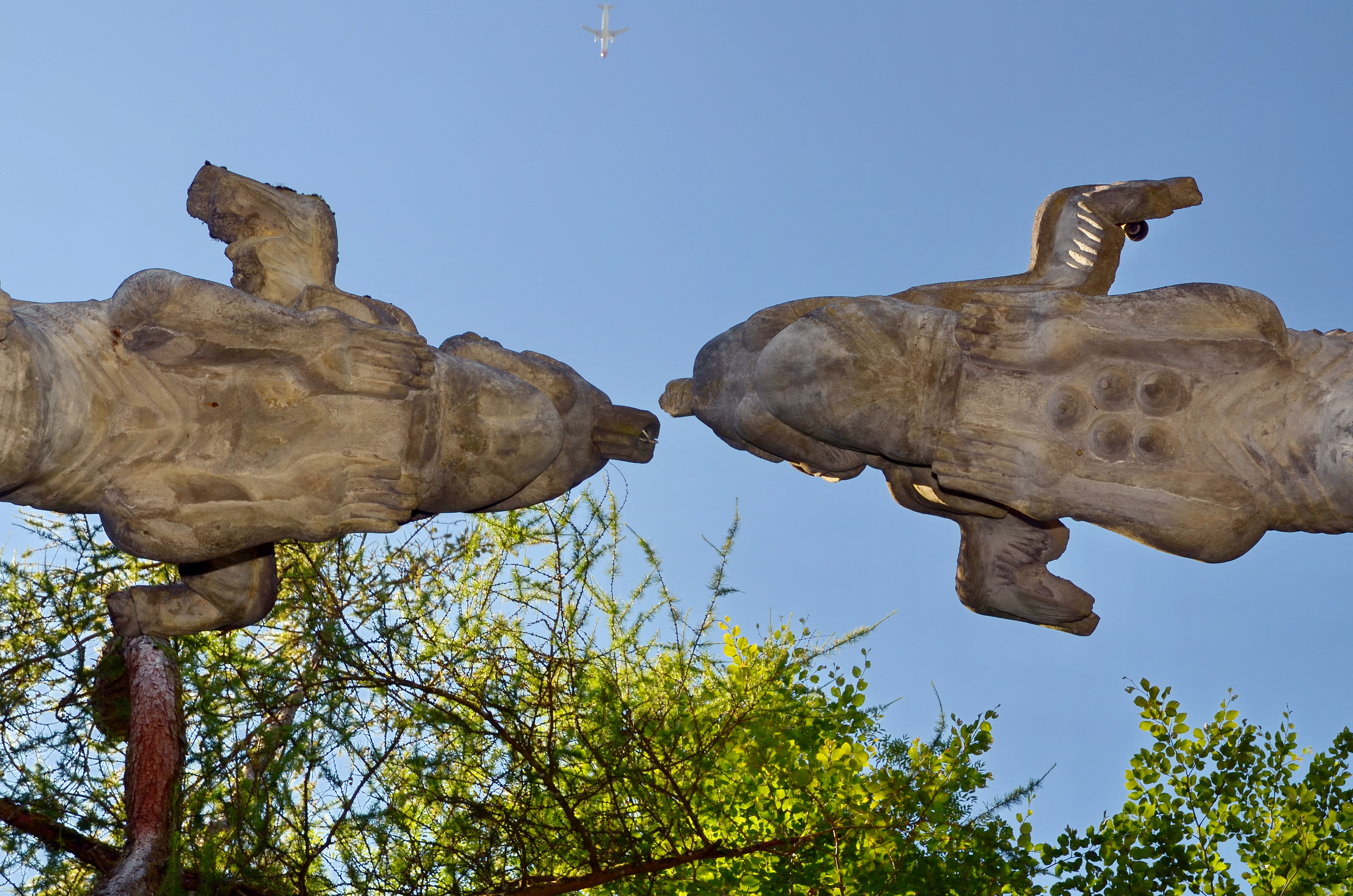
male and female

The interior decoration of the "ballsall", respectively Wassergartenhaus and of the villa was done by Bruno Weber and partially by his wife. The tower of the villa is 25 m (82 ft) high; the villa's ground floor is partially open for public access. The so-called Flügelhund is a beton structure and may be used as a footbridge overlooking nearly the whole garden, except the area in the forest to the northwest.

== Facilities ==
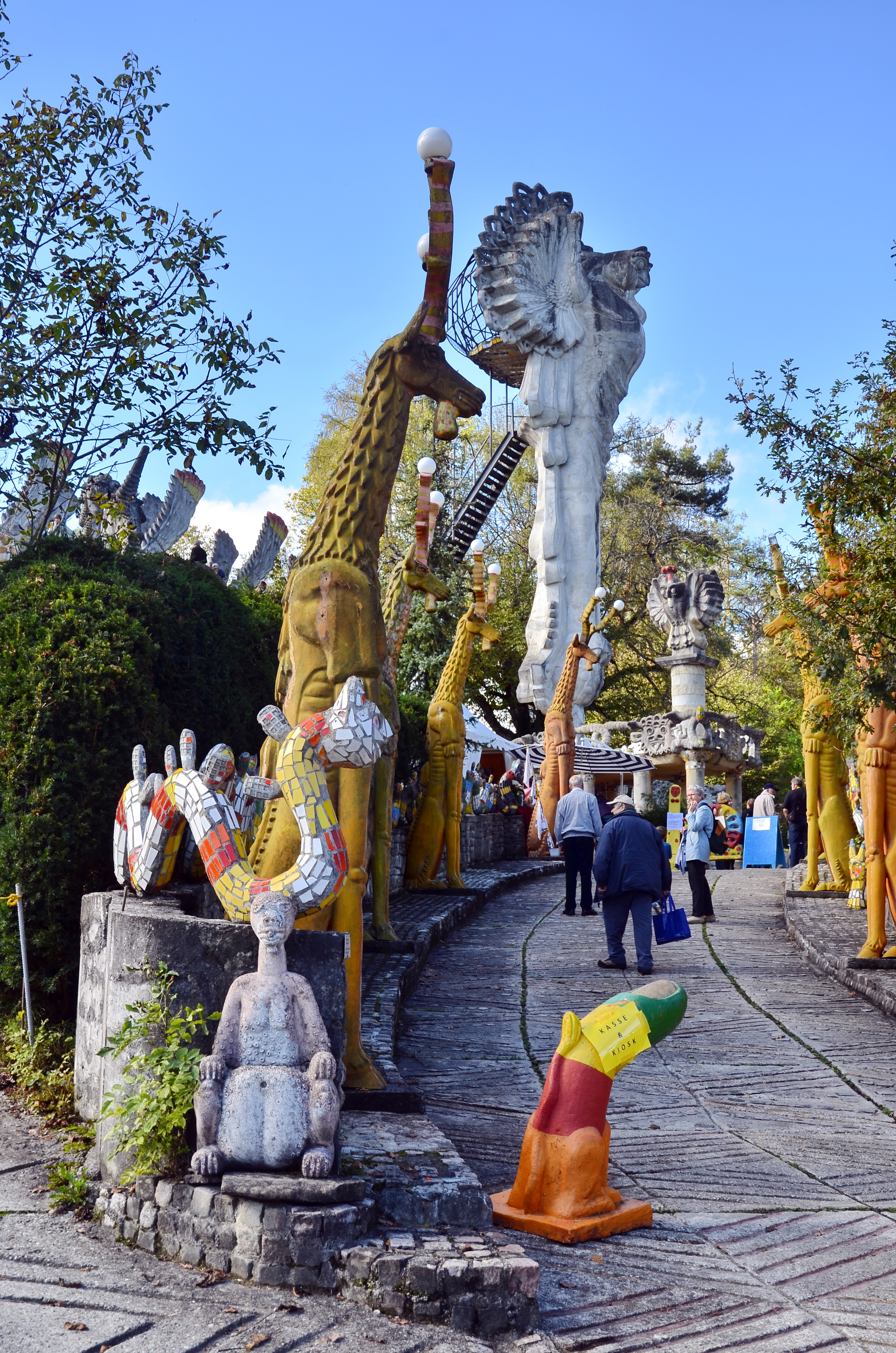
entrance

Bruno Weber Park is situated on the Weinberg hill towards the Heitersberg mountain, i.e. in the west of Dietikon respectively in the south of Spreitenbach. It can be reached by public buses in Dietikon, respectively Spreitenbach to Gjuchstrasse or preferred by Bus 325 from Dietikon Bahnhof to Weinberg stop, or by foot in about 30 minutes from Dietikon railway station. In 2006, the municipalities of Spreitenbach and Dietikon inaugurated a road, Bruno Weber Weg, leading from Dietikon station to the Bruno Weber Park.

As of October 2014, the park has around 20 men and women working there, most of them volunteering, and a core staff of four. Before the final situation was getting worse, the staff planned to establish permanent atelier rooms for rental to artists and to have a place for the mosaics, furniture and small sculptures still made by the park's team.

== History ==
Starting in 1962, Bruno Weber created the sculpture park in the vicinity of his former studio and residence in the municipality of Dietikon in the canton of Zurich. Bruno Weber, Mrs Maria Anna Weber-Godon and in later years her daughter Mrs Rebecca Piperio-Weber, and since the early years, Mr Jimmy Kryeziu expanded the park by constantly integrating new sculptures, mosaics and buildings. Since 1976, Bruno Weber has been in dispute with the authorities of the municipalities Dietikon and Spreitenbach, because of the illegally constructed structures and the sculptures in the forest, which is part of the park. Finally received a lump sum, all buildings and structures got the official approval in 1998. In the same year, Bruno Weber crafted some more sculptures leading from outside the area to the park, to make the access easier and more 'visible' for visitors.

The Bruno-Weber-Stiftung (a foundation according to Swiss law) was founded in 1990 to grant financial support and to exercise administrative issues. The foundation should also ensure the completion of the long-time-planned Wassergarten (water garden, inaugurated in 2012) as the centrepiece of the park, and grant the long-term financing of its operation, which temporarily failed in spring 2014. After Bruno Weber's death in 2011, Maria Anna Weber-Godon sat down with her twin daughters for the preservation and continuation of the life's work of her husband. The government of the Canton of Aargau approved in May 2014 no further operating subsidies and "attested to the work of the artist in the grounds, although of regional, but not even necessarily a cantonal importance".

In 1998, the park was transformed into a unique special Zone for artistic creation within Switzerland to legalise the infrastructure; in 2003, the rezoning was approved by the Spreitenbach community meeting and in 2005 by the canton of Aargau. The legal problems comprise restrictions which do not allow the use of the full potential of activities on the ground, e.g., events to establish new incomes, therefore are limited. Since Bruno Weber's death in October 2011, the ownership and use conditions of the parks have been fixed by a contract between the family and the board of trustees. The artist's widow, who has lived in the house in the sculpture park since 1969, was instrumental in establishing her husband's work.

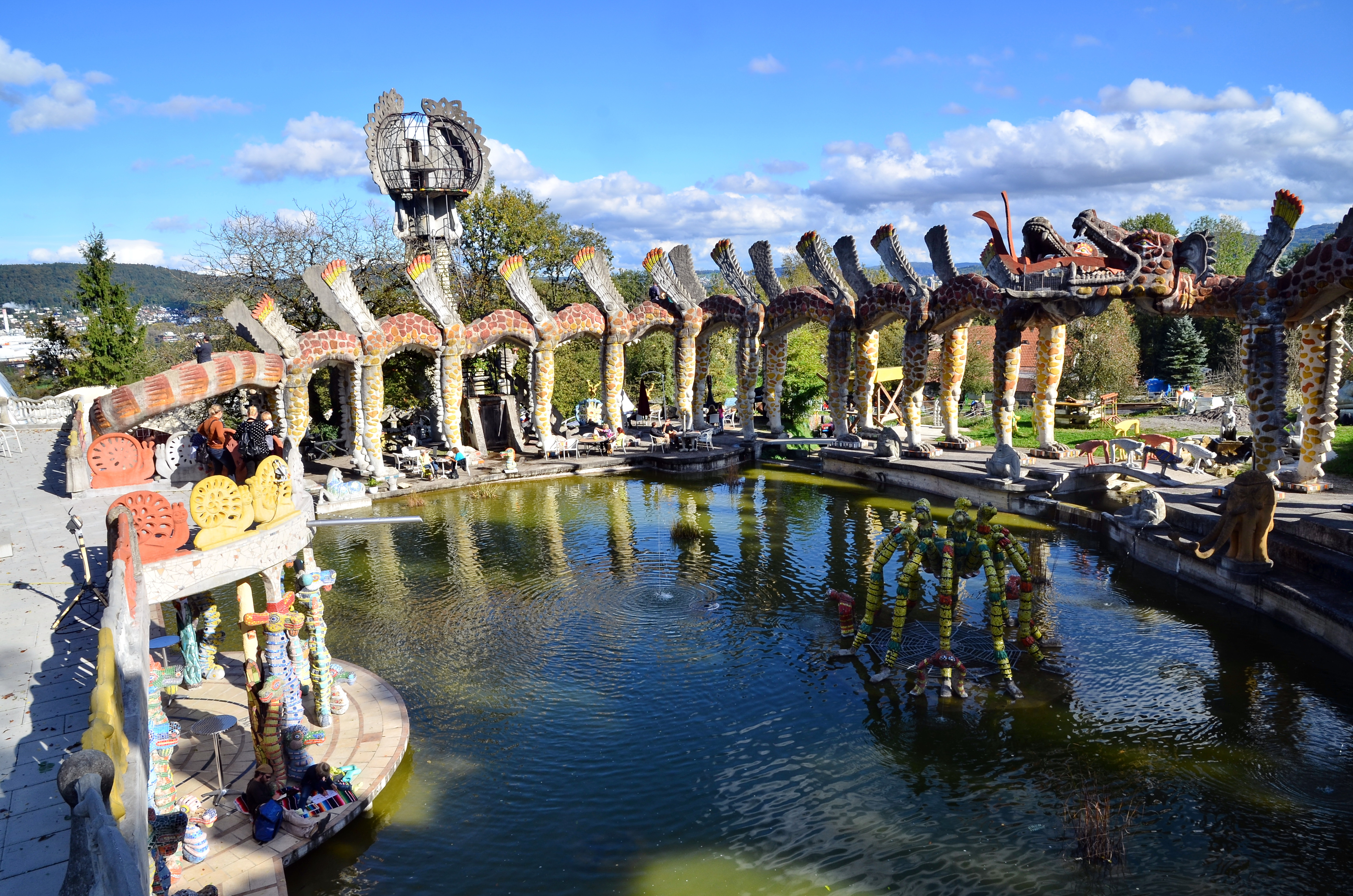
water garden

Despite 20,000 visitors per year, the trustees announced on 22 August 2014 that they would close the park on 20 October 2014, Among others, Guido Magnaguagno, an art expert and the former director of the Tinguely Museum, judged the sculpture garden as a "Monument national". and urgently renovations and maintaining could not be performed. The trustee's board hoped for a reorganisation and continuation of the park, including the needed support of more sponsors and donations. The garden is therefore supported by the Freunde des Bruno Weber Parks (friends of Bruno Weber Park) society, local and national politicians and artists, among them Franz Hohler, and as of mid-October 2014 by a wide variety of reports in the national newspapers and television, as well by two petitions and by public support in the social media. Mrs Maria Anna Weber-Godon (the family still owns 2/3 of the park) told in an interview on Swiss television on 19 October 2014, that she is confident that a solution to the continued operation of the sculpture garden may be found. On 3 November 2014 the election of a new board of the Bruno Weber foundation occurred, to avert the impending liquidation of the foundation and the garden's definitive closure. According to the first media release, it was unclear when the Bruno Weber Park may be opened again, but the board of trustees initially started to provide structural reforms and develop new concepts. The re-established three-person board of trustees, presides by Mrs Isabelle Cart, owns the full confidence by the Weber family, as Mrs Weber also confirmed. Indeed, the initiative started by the friends of Bruno Weber Park and the petition, which resulted in 11,340 signatures by 3 October 2014, and subsequently collected 4,286 votes. Overall, 15,626 people have signed the petition and may have saved the Bruno Weber Park. Bruno Weber Park is saved, titled Schweiz aktuell its broadcast on 13 January 2015 – the garden was re-opened on 4 April 2015. The weekend on 4/5 April 2015, although the weather was stormy, attracted about 700 visitors.

== Legal and financial situation ==
However, notwithstanding that the park was temporarily closed, the interest in the population is huge, and to succeed, a new board of trustees was formed, but also the financial base needs to be improved; due to the structural and financial problems, the former trustees stepped in for one, and therefore, the closure of the park was proclaimed in autumn 2014.

Bruno Weber Park is saved, titled Schweiz aktuell, was broadcast on 13 January 2015, but the financial situation remains tense, and the new board of trustees is looking for more sponsors. The three-person board of trustees, presided by Mrs Isabelle Cart, has the full confidence of the Weber family. The master plan presented on 31 March 2015 includes the renovation of the cement sculptures of the water garden within the next two years, hence, temporarily some of the sculptures are not accessible to the public when the park was re-opened on 4 April 2015, and, despite the entry fee had to be raised. The renovation of the infrastructure and the consolidation of the financial base are set on the schedule of the new board of trustees to 2018, respectively, 2022. As of September 2015, the canton of Aargau still stops its financial support, unless a master plan will be presented by the board of trustees. The sculptures and structures, exposed for decades to wind and weather, must be rehabilitated, by overall an investment requirement of 2 to 2.5 million Swiss Francs; at least 250,000 Swiss Francs immediately, and additional 200,000 Swiss Francs a year are needed for longtime operation of the Bruno Weber Park.

== Renovation of the park ==
As of July 2015, a fireproof repository for non-sculptural art by Bruno Weber was established, consisting of paintings, drawings and graphics. By the end of 2015, the hall of the water garden will be divided and the workshop set up, and about half a million Swiss Francs will be spent on various tasks. The new board has also determined the medium-term to long-term planning: By 2018, the infrastructure for the preservation of the park will be provided. At the same time, the structure of the archives will be established, the double pyramid will be relocated, and the renovation of paths and squares will be carried out. By 2022, it is planned to open the park for overnight visits, including artificial lighting, renovation of buildings, pavilions and a villa. Likewise, the production of sculptures should be restarted. By 2026, the park will hopefully be declared a national monument. Similarly, the six-day operation should be started, the renovation of the house completed, and a café should be opened. Until 2036, further renovations of the park, even enlargements by visions of Bruno Weber, will be scheduled.

The foundation collected donations of 250,000 Swiss Francs (CHF) instead of the scheduled CHF 500,000 in 2015. According to the foundation, this was pleasing due to the ongoing restructuring, and in addition, the patronage practically had to be completely rebuilt. During the 100 opening days, the park attracted more than 23,000 visitors. An inventory of all work by Bruno Weber, including drawings and sketches, was started, but due to the large amount of Weber's works, it will take much time.

== Trivia ==
Franz Hohler said in an interview that just the construction costs for 6 m (20 ft) of the Swiss Autobahn infrastructure may help to secure the further maintenance of the park.

== Literature ==
- Hans-Ruedi Bramaz, edited by Stefan Howald, designed by Helen Ebert. With contributions by Franz Hohler, Fritz Billeter, Peter K. Wehrli, Roman Hocke, Helene Arnet, Peter Conrad, and a foreword by Christine Egerszegi-Obrist: Bruno Weber: Die Kraft der Phantasie. Ein Lebenswerk. Hirmer Verlag, Munich, ISBN 978-3-7774-2081-3.
- Peter K. Wehrli, photographs by Robert Elter: Bruno Weber - Der Architekt seiner Träume. Benteli, 2002, ISBN 3-7165-1263-X.

== Awards (excerpt) ==
- 1999–2001: Werkbeiträge Migros
- 2006: Bruno Weber Weg
