= Bruno Weber =

Swiss artist and architect (1931–2011)

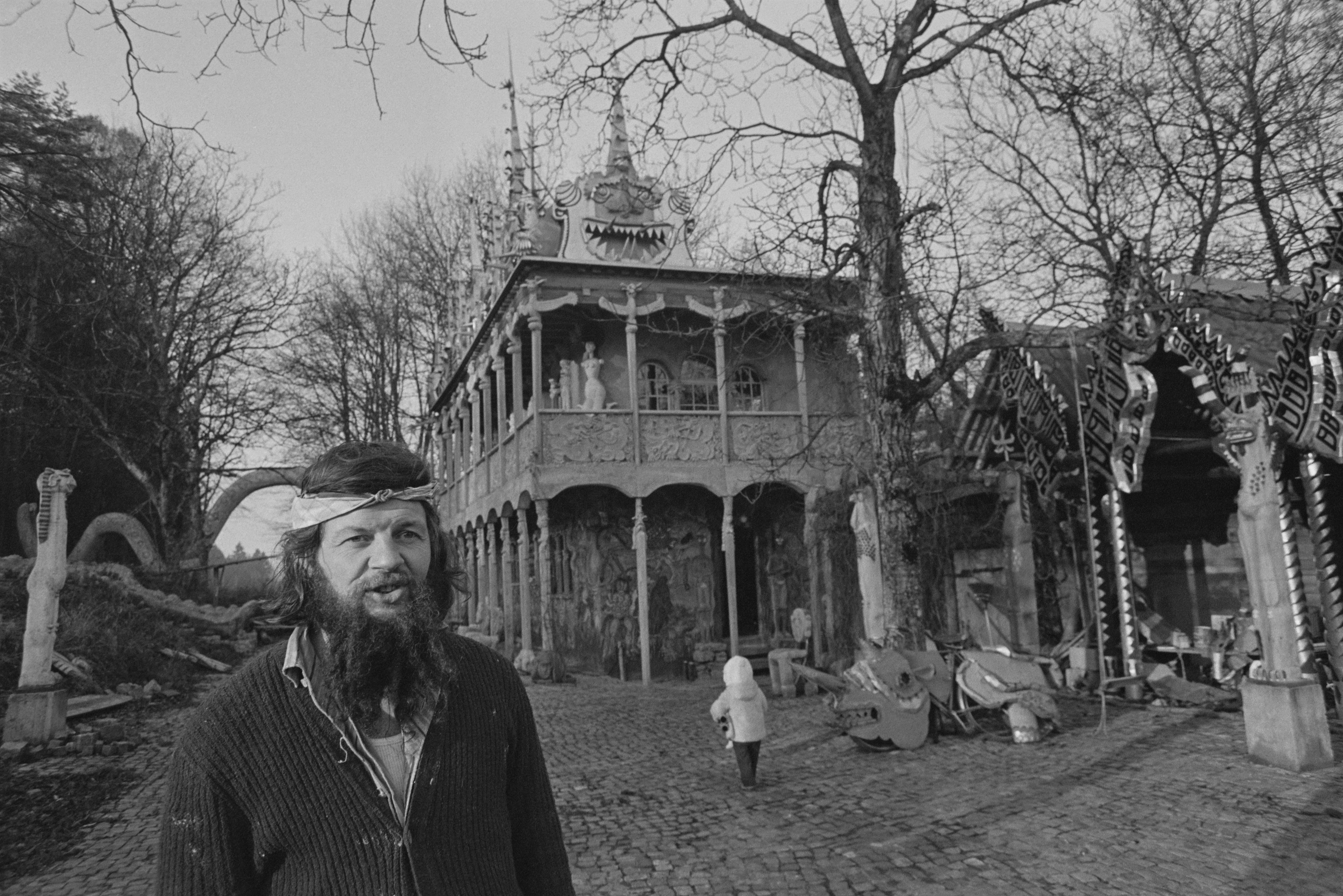
Bruno Weber 1974 in his park

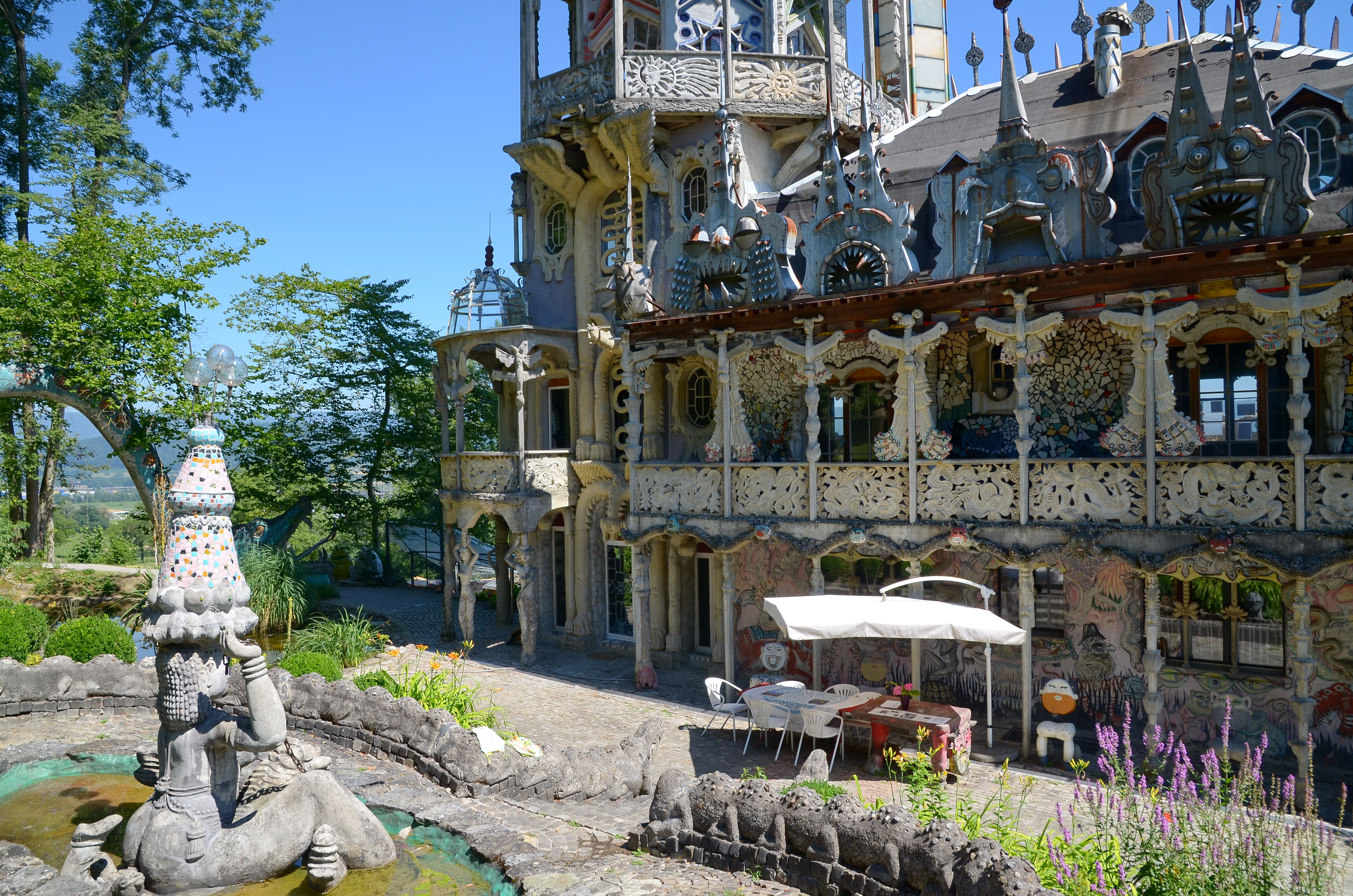
The home of Bruno Weber, as of today the Bruno Weber Park

Bruno Weber (10 April 1931 – 24 October 2011) was a Swiss artist and architect, specialising in fantastic realism.

== Biography ==
=== Early life ===
Bruno Weber was born in 1931 in Dietikon, Switzerland. In 1947, he completed college in Zürich under Johannes Itten, the inventor of a "color sphere". Afterwards, he began training until 1949 as a lithographer with Orell Fuessli (Zürich); later he studied in Italy, Greece and Czechoslovakia.

=== Career ===
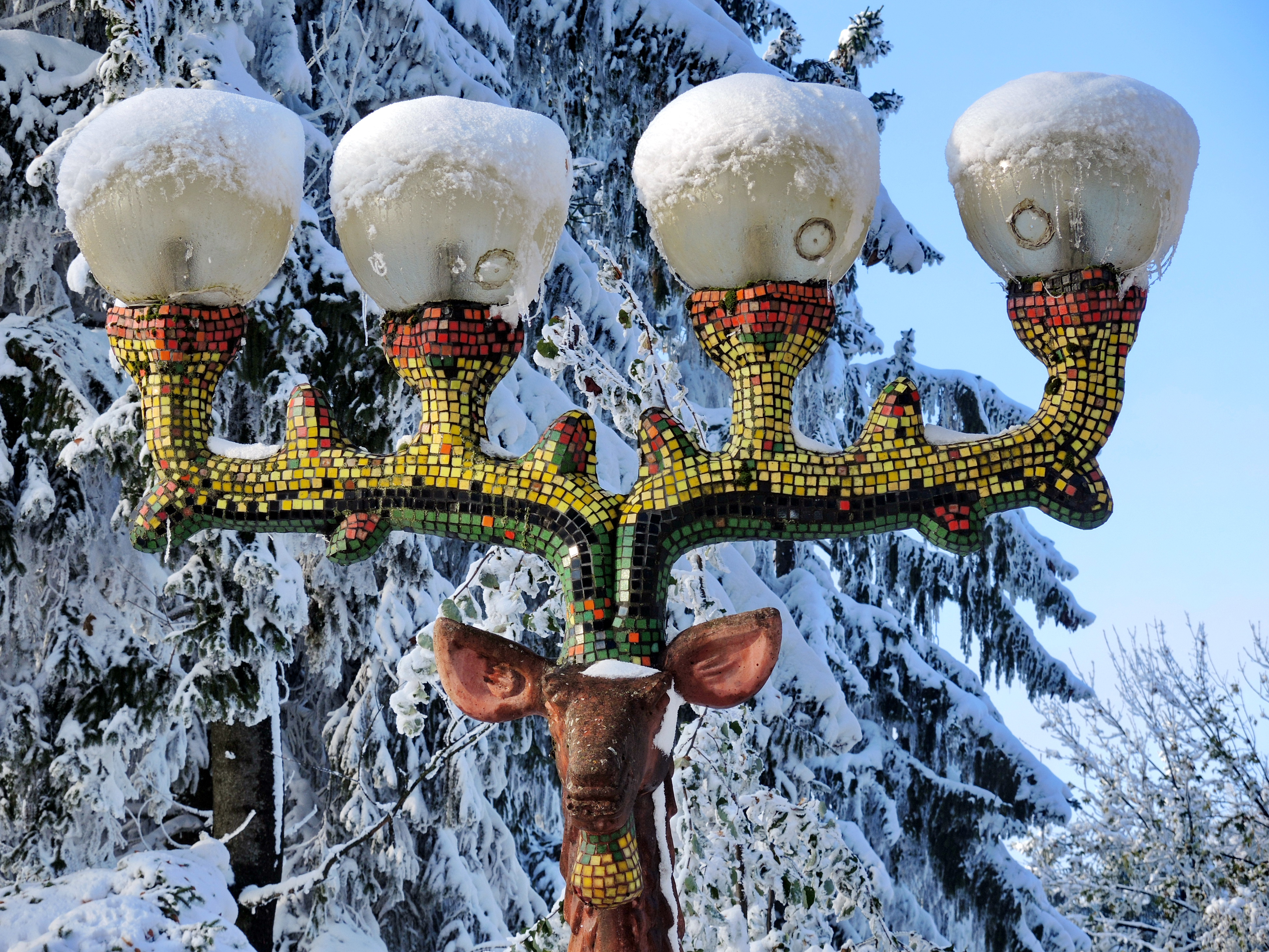
One of the deer lamps on Ueltiberg mountain

Weber extended his Bruno Weber Park (a sculpture garden) in Spreitenbach and Dietikon, where, among other things, his house with a 25m high tower is situated. The park extends over a surface of 20'000 m². The sculpture park is the synthesis of the artist's life's work, and is visited annually by thousands of people. From 1991 to 2003, Weber was responsible for the sculptural decorations on the Uetliberg mountain, including the street lamps leading to the top of Zürich plateau (Uto Kulm) and park benches, that still exist.

Weber cooperated with Zürich architect Justus Dahinden, making sculptures for buildings in Dahinden, Vienna and Zürich.

He discovered his passion for three-dimensional sculptures after thirty years of painting. On the basis of his paintings, development can be recognised, contrary to his sculptures, which are oriented to Cézanne and Gubler.

In 2006, the municipalities of Spreitenbach and Dietikon inaugurated a road – Bruno Weber Weg – leading from Dietikon railway station to the Bruno Weber Park.

== Awards (excerpts) ==
- 1999–2001: Werkbeiträge Migros
- 2006: Bruno Weber Weg

== Literature ==
- Hans-Ruedi Bramaz, edited by Stefan Howald, designed by Helen Ebert. With contributions by Franz Hohler, Fritz Billeter, Peter K. Wehrli, Roman Hocke, Helene Arnet, Peter Conrad, and a foreword by Christine Egerszegi-Obrist: Bruno Weber: Die Kraft der Phantasie. Ein Lebenswerk. Hirmer Verlag, Munich, ISBN 978-3-7774-2081-3.
- Peter K. Wehrli, photographs by Robert Elter: Bruno Weber - Der Architekt seiner Träume. Benteli, 2002, ISBN 3-7165-1263-X.
