= Johann-Peter-Hebel-Preis =

German literary award

The Johann-Peter-Hebel-Preis (Johann Peter Hebel Prize) is a literary award issued by the German state of Baden-Württemberg. It was endowed in 1936 in honour of the writer and Alemannic poet Johann Peter Hebel. The prize is since 1974 awarded every two years (before every year) to writers, translators, essayists, media representatives or scientists from the German state of Baden-Württemberg writing in Alemannic dialect or whose works are connected with Hebel. The ceremony of the €20,000 prize (since 2024; formerly €10,000) takes place in Hausen im Wiesental, which is also home to the "Hebelfest" every 10 May, Hebel's birthday.

== Winners ==
- 1936 Hermann Burte
- 1937 Alfred Huggenberger
- 1938 Eduard Reinacher
- 1939 Hermann Eris Busse
- 1940 Benno Rüttenauer
- 1941 Emil Strauß
- 1942 Wilhelm Weigand
- 1943 Jakob Schaffner
- 1946 Anton Fendrich
- 1947 Franz Schneller
- 1948 Traugott Meyer
- 1949 Wilhelm Hausenstein
- 1950 Wilhelm Altwegg
- 1951 Albert Schweitzer
- 1952 Max Picard
- 1953 Reinhold Zumtobel
- 1954 Otto Flake
- 1955 Wilhelm Zentner
- 1956 Lina Kromer
- 1957 Emanuel Stickelberger
- 1958 Friedrich-Alfred Schmid-Noer
- 1959 Carl Jacob Burckhardt
- 1960 Martin Heidegger
- 1961 Albin Fringeli
- 1962 Richard Nutzinger
- 1963 Robert Minder
- 1964 Adalbert Bächtold
- 1965 Adalbert Welte
- 1966 Eberhard Meckel
- 1967 Josef Lefftz
- 1968 Hermann Schneider
- 1969 Gertrud Fussenegger
- 1970 Marie Luise Kaschnitz
- 1971 Lucien Sittler
- 1972 Kurt Marti
- 1973 Joseph Hermann Kopf
- 1974 Gerhard Jung
- 1976 André Weckmann
- 1978 Erika Burkart
- 1980 Elias Canetti
- 1982 Maria Menz
- 1984 Claude Vigée
- 1986 Peter Bichsel
- 1988 Michael Köhlmeier
- 1990 Manfred Bosch
- 1992 Adrien Finck
- 1994 Peter von Matt
- 1996 Kundeyt Surdum
- 1998 Lotte Paepcke
- 2000 Emma Guntz
- 2002 Markus Werner
- 2004 Maria Beig
- 2006 Martin Stadler
- 2008 Arno Geiger
- 2010 Arnold Stadler
- 2012 Karl-Heinz Ott
- 2014 Franz Hohler
- 2016 Lukas Bärfuss
- 2018 Christoph Meckel
- 2020 Sibylle Berg
- 2022 Monika Helfer
- 2024 Pierre Kretz
- 2026 Annette Pehnt

In 2026, on the occasion of the 200th anniversary of Johann Peter Hebel's death, in addition to the Johann-Peter-Hebel-Preis which was awarded to Annette Pehnt, a special honorary award was given to literary scholar Friedrich Pfäfflin.
