= Emma Guntz =

German-French writer (born 1937)

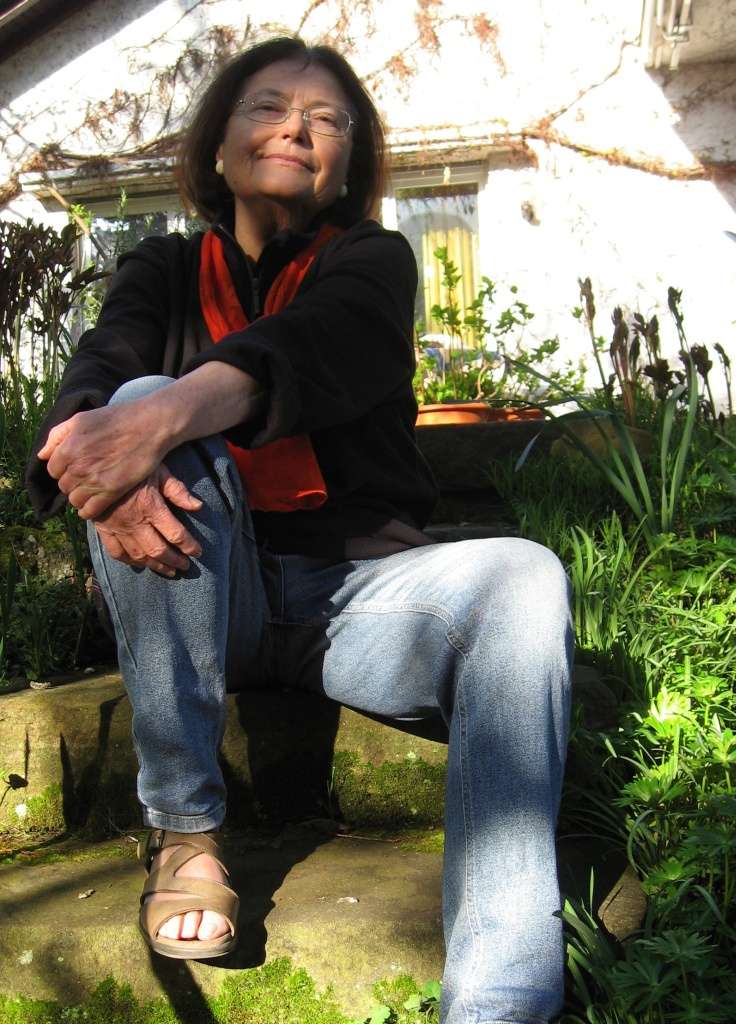
Emma GUNTZ - April 2011. (Photo by Pierre GUNTZ)

Emma Guntz (née Emma Linnebach) (born 30 August 1937 in Bruchsal) is a German-French poet, journalist and editor living and working in Strasbourg, France.

== Life ==
After passing her Abitur exam in her home town of Bruchsal, Emma Guntz studied English, Latin and history at the Ruprecht-Karls-University Heidelberg. Soon after graduation she married Antoine Guntz, a Strasbourg physician; they have three children. In the 1970s she worked as a radio journalist, communicating German culture and tradition to Alsatians. From 1984 to 1996 she hosted a weekly broadcast on poetry at Radio France 3 Alsace, in which she presented contemporary poetry in French, German and the Alsatian dialect.
The first collection of her own poetry, In Klarschrift (In Plain Writing), was published in 1996, followed by others, the last one (in 2009) being Späte Widmung (Late Dedication). Her recent work "MAdamEva" (2015) is in prose and presents a special version of Genesis, mainly from Eve’s point of view. Literary critic Gabriele Weingartner attests that Guntz has found "poetic words full of imagination and precise in style." ."

As a writing journalist she contributed feuilleton articles, e.g. for the German-language edition of Dernières Nouvelles d'Alsace, as well as apostils and short stories. In 2000 she was awarded the Johann Peter Hebel Award, of Baden-Württemberg, and in 2001 she was the first woman to be honored by Deidesheim in Rhineland-Palatinate as Turmschreiberin (tower scribe), which meant sporadic sojourns in the medieval castle tower and resulted in the publication of another collection of poems Ein Jahr Leben (One year of Life), partly dedicated to Deidesheim.

Apart from her literary and journalistic work Emma Guntz was instrumental in co-organizing the ten conferences of the literarische Biennale Mitteleuropa (a biannual meeting of central European literature) at Strasbourg-Schiltigheim (1989–2008). From 1986 to 2001 she was chair person of an organization for the social reintegration of young and permanently unemployed persons.

== Publications ==
- Essays on literature and culture, mainly in the journal ALLMENDE edited by Hermann Bausinger, Adolf Muschg, Martin Walser, André Weckmann, Manfred Bosch
- Short stories and poems e.g. in Lesebuch Schreibende Frauen – edited by Anne Birk / Birgit Heiderich / Regine Kress-Fricke, G. Braun Verlag Karlsruhe 1988
- Elsass, ein literarischer Reisebegleiter, co-edited with André Weckmann, Insel-Verlag, Frankfurt a. M. und Leipzig 2001, ISBN 3-458-34446-2
- with Franz Handschuh, Claudia Klein, Wendelinus Wurth: MAdamEva, Drey Verlag, Gutach 2015, ISBN 978-3-933765-84-0

Poetry Collections:

- In Klarschrift, Le Drapier Editeur 1996
- Hasen sterben lautlos - couleur fraise, couleur framboise, Gollenstein Blieskastel 2000 ISBN 3-933389-21-6
- Ein Jahr Leben - Deidesheimer Gedichte, Verlag Pfälzer Kunst, Landau 2002 ISBN 3-922580-92-0
- Späte Widmung, Drey Verlag Gutach 2009 ISBN 978-3-933765-45-1
- Noch. with illustrations by Claudia Klein und Franz Hartschuh, Drey Verlag, Gutach 2019, ISBN 978-3-948482-02-2

== Honors ==
- 1987: René Schickele media award (Strasbourg) awarded by an organization supporting bilingual culture in Alsace
- 1997: Hebelplakette (Hebel medal) by Hausen im Wiesental
- 2000: Johann-Peter-Hebel-Preis by Baden-Württemberg
- 2001: Turmschreiberin (tower scribe) in Deidesheim
