= Alemannischer Literaturpreis =

German literary award

Alemannischer Literaturpreis is a German literary prize. It was established in 1981 and is awarded to authors in the Alemannic regions of Germany. The prize was originally awarded every two years but changed to every three years in 1987. The winner is awarded €10,000.

== Winners ==
- 1981: Ernst Burren
- 1983: Maria Beig
- 1985: Manfred Bosch
- 1987: Franz Hohler
- 1990: Markus Werner
- 1993: Robert Schneider
- 1996: Hermann Kinder
- 1999: Arnold Stadler
- 2002: Martin Walser
- 2005: Karl-Heinz Ott
- 2008: Peter Weber
- 2011: Peter Stamm
- 2014: Thomas Hürlimann
- 2017: Arno Geiger
- 2020: Christoph Keller
- 2024: Julia Weber
