= Max Picard =

German-Swiss philosopher

- Born: 5 June 1888; Schopfheim, Baden, Germany
- Died: 3 October 1965 (aged 77); Sorengo, Switzerland
- Citizenship: Switzerland
- Occupations: writer, philosopher
- Writing career
- Language: German

Max Picard (5 June 1888 in Schopfheim, Baden, Germany – 3 October 1965 in Sorengo, Switzerland) was a German-Swiss writer and philosopher.

== Biography ==
Born to a Jewish family in Schopfheim, a German village on the Swiss border, Max Picard studied medicine and received his medical degree in 1911. He practiced medicine, first in Heidelberg and later in Munich. Unsatisfied with the positivist and Darwinian orientations of the medical profession at the time, he began as of 1915 to distance himself from it to turn more towards philosophy. In 1919, he immigrated to Switzerland, first to Locarno and later to Brissago.

In 1929, he completed work on Das Menschengesicht (The Human Face). In 1934, Die Flucht vor Gott (The Flight From God) was published. He developed a friendship with fellow immigrant and artist Gunter Böhmer in the late 1930s. In 1939, Picard converted to Roman Catholicism from the Judaism of his youth.

He first met the French philosopher Gabriel Marcel in 1947, and developed a friendship and steady correspondence throughout their lives (published in 2006). Marcel provided the foreword to the first French translation of Picard's Die Welt des Schweigens (The World of Silence) in 1953. Picard received the Johann-Peter-Hebel-Preis in 1952.

Emmanuel Levinas praised Picard's work in Levinas' collection Noms propres (Proper Names) in 1976.

== Selected books ==
- 1917 Expressionistische Bauernmalerei [Expressionist Folk Painting]. München: Delphin
- 1921 Der letzte Mensch [The Last Man]. Leipzig: E. T. Tal & Co.
- 1930 Das Menschengesicht [The Human Face]. München: Delphin (published in English in 1931)
- 1934 Die flucht vor Gott [The Flight From God]. Erlenbach: Rentsch (published in English in 1952)
- 1947 Hitler in uns selbst [Hitler in Our Selves]. Erlenbach: Rentsch (published in English in 1947)
- 1948 Die Welt des Schweigens [The World of Silence]. Erlenbach-Zürich/Konstanz: Rensch
- 1954 Die Atomisierung der Modernen Künste [The Atomization of Modern Arts]. Hamburg: Furche
