= Kannitverstan =

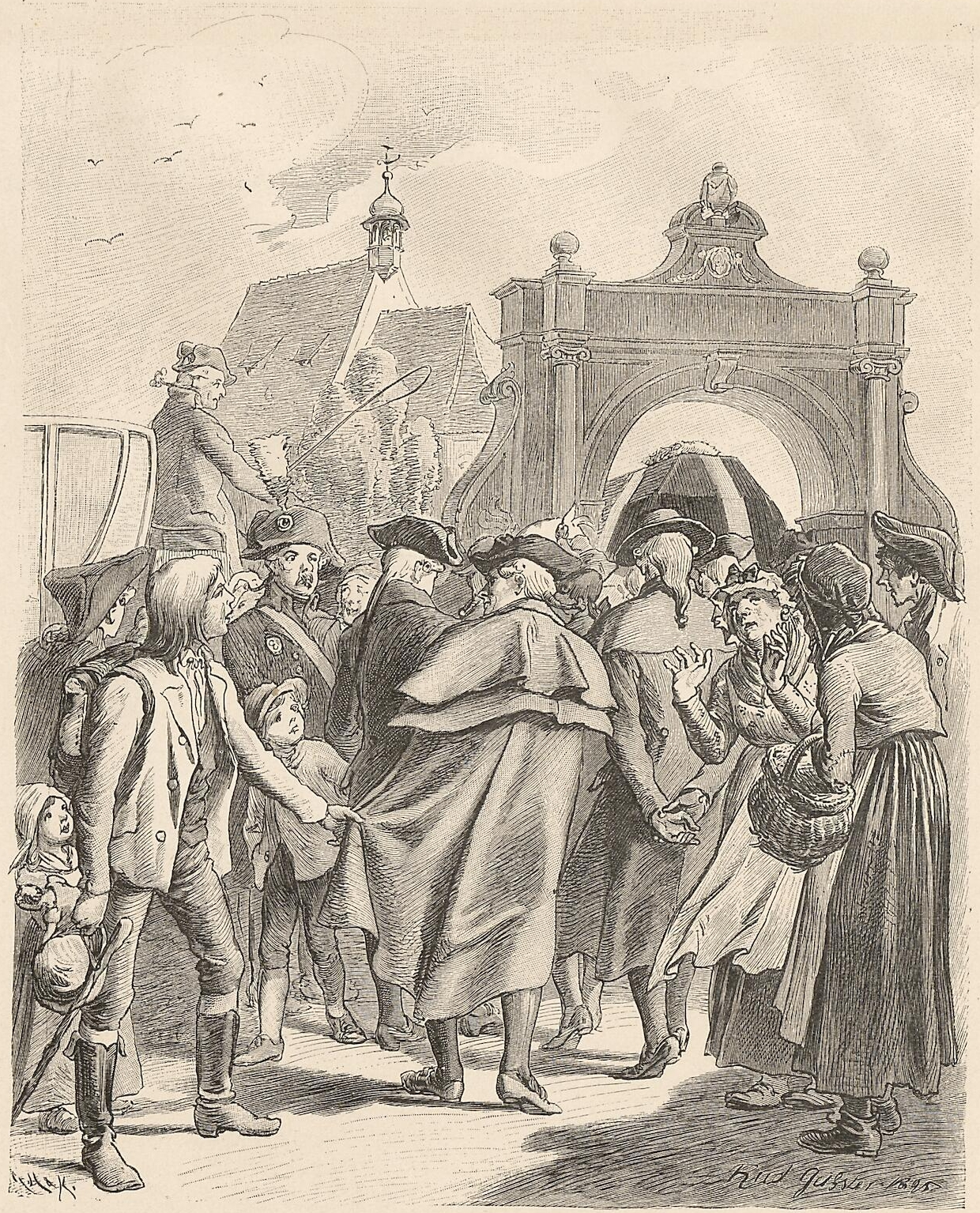
Illustration by Rudolf Geißler for the magazine Münchener Bilderbogen, 1895: The craftsman boy meets the funeral procession of Mr Kannitverstan

Kannitverstan is a short story by the German author Johann Peter Hebel, which first appeared as a calendar story in 1808 in Rheinländischer Hausfreund (Rhenish family friend). It tells of a craftsman who, as a result of a misunderstanding, comes to realise the transience of earthly things and thus regains his contentment.

== Plot ==
A young workman from Tuttlingen (then part of the Duchy of Württemberg) visited the cosmopolitan city of Amsterdam for the first time in his life and was impressed by a particularly stately home and a large ship laden with precious commodities. He innocently asked people about the owners of the house and the boat and both times the answer was "Kannitverstan", which means "I can not understand you". The simple-minded workman, however, believed that it was the name of a man called "Kannitverstan", and was impressed by the supposed Mr. Kannitverstan's wealth, and at the same time felt victimized in the face of his own poverty. Later in the day, he observed a funeral procession and asked one of the mourners who the deceased was. When he received the answer "Kannitverstan" he mourned for the late Mr. Kannitverstan, but at the same time felt very light-hearted, because he realized that death knows no social differences and everything in life is fleeting. Thus, the workman suffered his own poverty much better.

== Origins ==
Kannitverstan is based on a true story. In 1757, the 17-year-old Count Adam Philippe de Custine traveled to Amsterdam and admired a beautiful country house and a great lady. He heard that the winner of the Dutch lottery was announced and observed a funeral procession. Curious, he asked for the names of these people and always got the answer, "Ik kan niet verstaan". The young Count believed then that there existed a "Mr. Kannitverstan". Some time later he saw the lady again, and he offered his condolences for the death of her husband, Mr. Kannitverstan. This led to great laughter but eventually the misunderstanding was clarified. This hilarious episode appeared in written form for the first time in 1782 in the essay collection Les numéros by Charles Peyssonel and was reprinted in 1783 in German in Luzernischen Wochenblatt.

== Reception ==
In the literature, Kannitverstan is regarded as a narrative whose key message is clear to all readers: Every man should be content with what he has and what he is, because in the end death overcomes everyone, whether rich or poor. However, the belief that this was the guiding principle is not shared unanimously by everyone. The jocular nature of the story is often pointed out and readers are asked to not take the story and its message too seriously. Even during Hebel's lifetime, some of his stories from Rheinländischer Hausfreund were included in German textbooks. Kannitverstan still widely appears in textbooks today because of its easily accessible core message and its humorous style which is appropriate for school curricula.
