= Maria Beig =

German school teacher and author (1920–2018)

- Born: October 8, 1920
- Died: September 3, 2018 (aged 97)
- Occupation: Author
- Writing career
- Notable awards: Alemannischer Literaturpreis; Johann-Peter-Hebel-Preis

Maria Beig (8 October 1920 – 3 September 2018) was a German school teacher and author.

== Life and career ==
Beig was born on 8 October 1920 near Lake Constance in the German region of Swabia.

Beig published her first novel, Rabenkrächzen (Raven's Croak) in 1982. It followed the fictional lives of four families from Meckenbeuren. While it was unpopular in her home region of Swabia, it did win the Alemannischer Literaturpreis in 1983.

Her second novel Hochzeitlose (Lost Weddings) was published in 1983 and follows four women from Swabia during the World War I and II. It is set out as four novellas, each focusing on a different woman; Babette, Helene, Klara and Martha, and their refusal to marry. It was translated into English by Jaimy Gordon and Peter Blickle.

Her novel, Hermine: An Animal Life, centers around a fictional woman and her interactions with 64 species of animal on her family's farm. It was also translated by Gordon and Blickle.

In 1996, she won the Johann-Friedrich-von-Cotta-Literatur- und Übersetzerpreis der Landeshauptstadt Stuttgart award and was awarded with the Johann-Peter-Hebel-Preis in 2004.

Her success as a writer was in part aided by the encouraging support she received from the German novelist Martin Walser who directed her to publish with Suhrkamp, a major publisher in Germany. In 2009 she published her autobiography called Ein Lebensweg.
