= Der Kongress der Pinguine =

- Directed by: Hans-Ulrich Schlumpf
- Written by: Hans-Ulrich Schlumpf
- Cinematography: Pio Corradi; Patrick Lindenmaier
- Edited by: Fee Liechti
- Music by: Bruno Spoerri
- Release date: 1993
- Running time: 91 minutes
- Country: Switzerland
- Language: German

Der Kongress der Pinguine is a 1993 Swiss documentary film directed by Hans-Ulrich Schlumpf. It examines environmental change in Antartica, including the ozone hole and climate change. The film was later screened at a number of festivals, including the Locarno Festival in 2017.

== Synopsis ==
Set in Antarctica, the film shows the people living there as they observe changes in the global environment, including the ozone hole and climate change.

== Cast ==
The cast includes:

- Hans-Ulrich Schlumpf as Träumer
- Li Yun as Chinese im Eis
- Albert Freuler as Sprecher
- Peter Schweiger as Stimme des Träumers

== Production ==
In a 2005 interview, Schlumpf described Der Kongress der Pinguine as a more didactic film that sought to address environmental questions, and said that it was based on a dream.

== Reception ==
Filmdienst described the film as an engaged documentary about environmental damage and wrote that its landscape and wildlife footage made it compelling. Filmpodium noted that the film links Antarctic nature footage, research-laboratory images, and historical documentary material through dream narration addressing the continent's uniqueness and its vulnerability to human exploitation. In an interview with Filmbulletin, Schlumpf described the film as a more didactic work that sought to address environmental issues.

== Festival screenings ==
The film premiered in 1993. It was later screened at festivals including Filmfest Hamburg, the 11th Internationale Tage des ökologischen Films in Freiburg im Breisgau, the Duisburger Filmwoche, the Kasseler Dokumentarfilm- & Videofest, the 7th International Documentary Film Festival in Amsterdam, and the Festival International du Film de Montagne et Aventure in 1994. Later screenings included the Festival Internacional de Documentales FIDOCS in 1998 and the Locarno Festival in 2017.

== See also ==
- March of the Penguins (2005)
