= Arno Geiger =

Austrian novelist

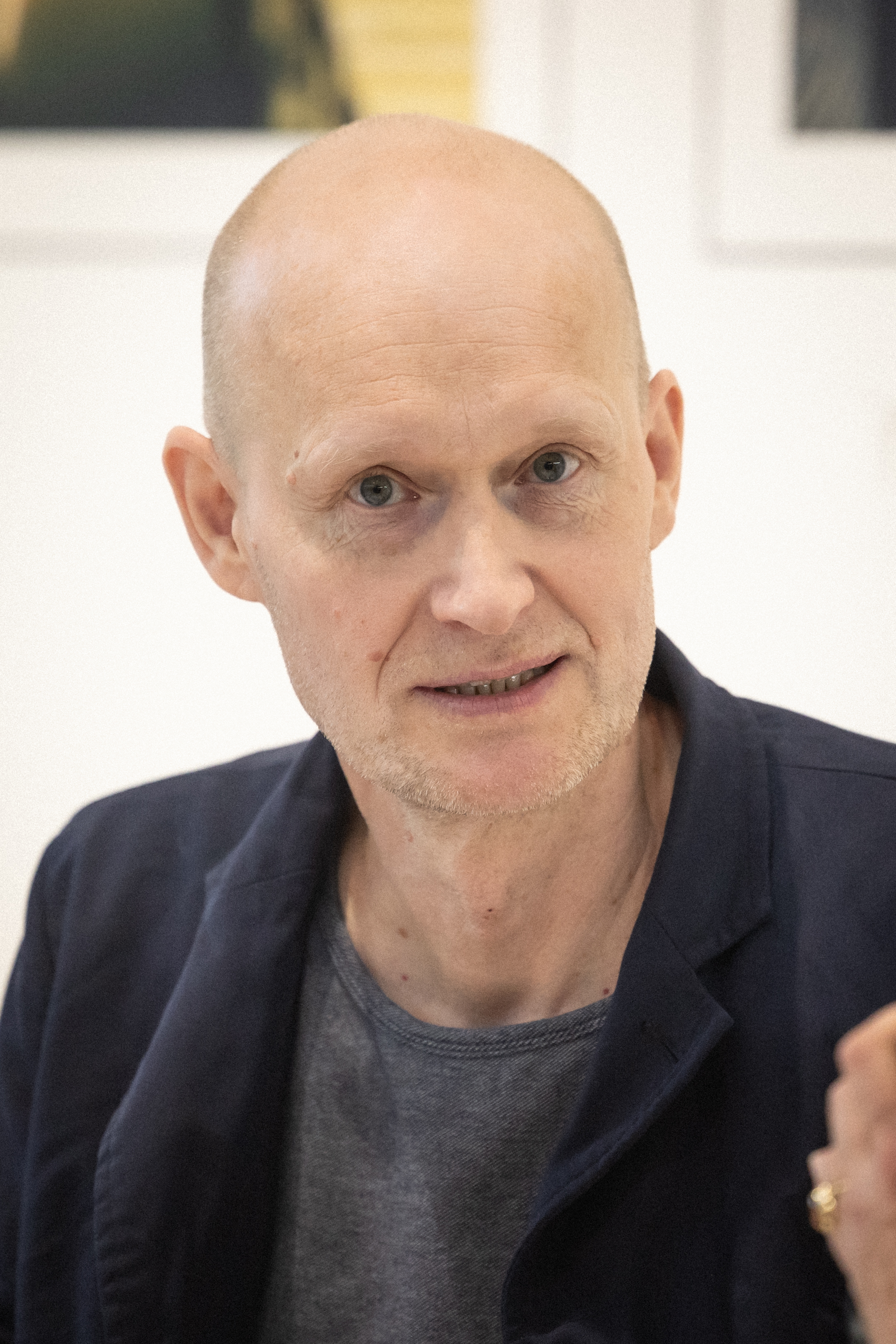
- Arno Geiger being interviewed in 2024
- Born: 22 July 1968 (age 58); Bregenz
- Writing career
- Language: German
- Notable work: Es geht uns gut
- Notable awards: Deutscher Buchpreis (2005)

Arno Geiger (born 22 July 1968) is an Austrian novelist.

Geiger grew up in the village of Wolfurt near Bregenz. He studied German studies, ancient history and comparative literature at the universities of Innsbruck and Vienna. He has worked as a freelance writer since 1993. From 1986 to 2002, he also worked as a technician at the annual Bregenzer Festspiele summer opera festival.

In 1996 and in 2004, he took part in the Ingeborg-Bachmann-Preis competition at Klagenfurt.

In October 2005, he was the recipient of the first Deutscher Buchpreis literature prize (awarded by the booksellers' association of Germany) for his novel Es geht uns gut.

First published in 2011, Geiger's autobiographical The Old King in His Exile has now, with this translation into English (published by And Other Stories in 2017), been translated into 28 languages. The memoir has won literary prizes including the 2011 Friedrich Hölderlin Prize, as well as prizes from medical societies in various countries, including the 2011 German Hospice and Palliative Care Association (DHPV) Award. His novel Unter der Drachenwand, published in Germany by Hanser, was translated into English by Jamie Bulloch and was published by Picador as Hinterland in 2022.

Geiger lives in Wolfurt and Vienna.

== Awards ==
- 1994 Scholarship by the Austrian Ministry of Science and Culture
- 1998 Abraham Woursell Award, New York (a talent award for young European writers)
- 2001 Carl-Mayer-Drehbuch-Förderpreis, Graz (a screenplay award named for screenplay writer Carl Mayer (1894–1944))
- 2005 Förderpreis zum Friedrich-Hölderlin-Preis, Bad Homburg (talent award)
- 2005 Deutscher Buchpreis
- 2011 Friedrich Hölderlin Prize
- 2011 German Hospice and Palliative Care Association (DHPV) Award
- 2011 Anton Wildgans Prize
- 2017 Alemannischer Literaturpreis
- 2023 Rheingau Literatur Preis
