= Franz Hohler =

Swiss author and cabaret performer

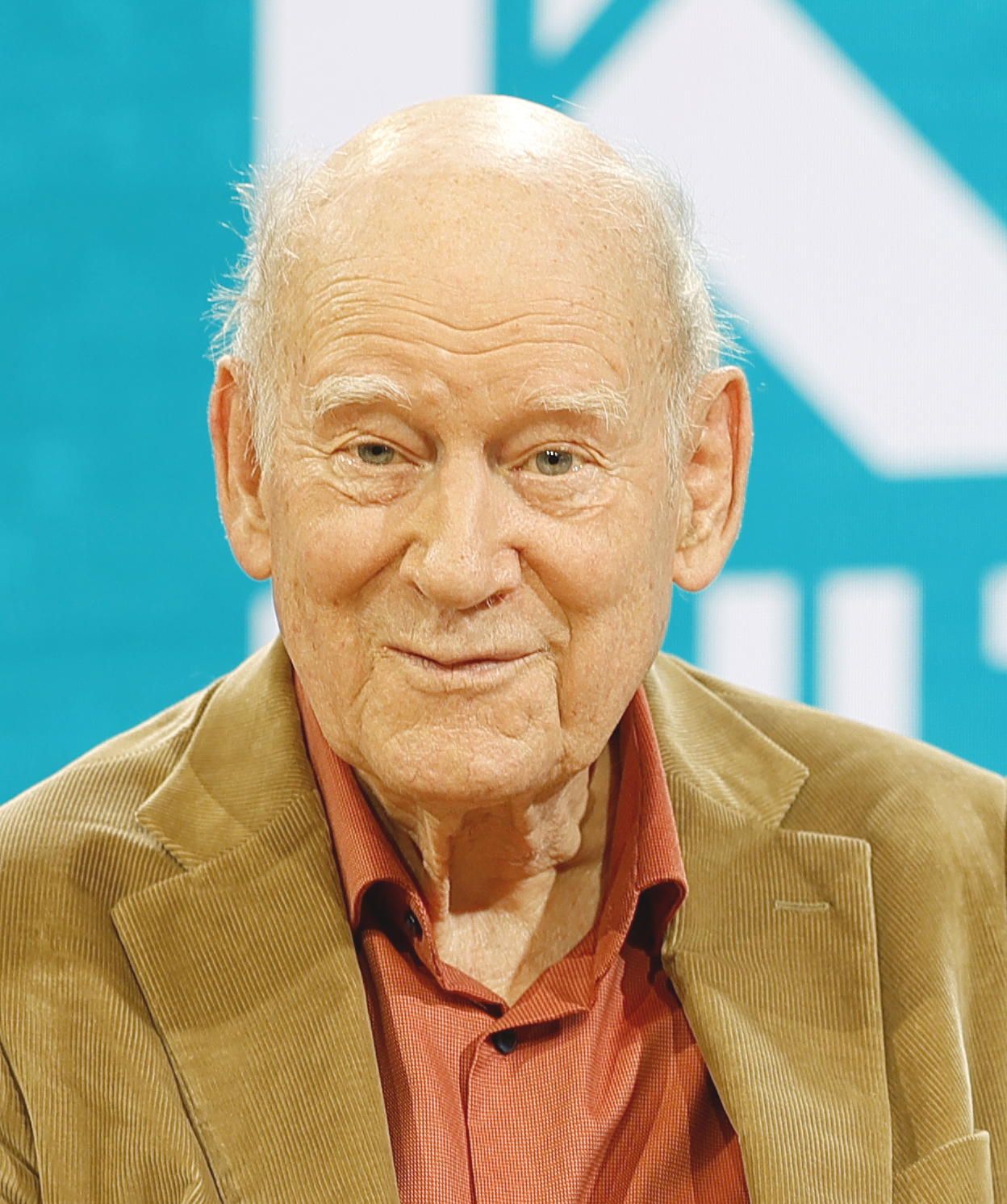
- Hohler in 2024
- Born: 1 March 1943 (age 83); Biel/Bienne, Switzerland
- Education: University of Zurich
- Occupations: Author, playwright, cabaret performer
- Writing career
- Period: 1967–present
- Notable work: s Totemügerli
- Notable awards: Alemannischer Literaturpreis (1987); Kassel Literary Prize (2002); Solothurner Literaturpreis (2013); Johann-Peter-Hebel-Preis (2014)
- Website: franzhohler.ch

Franz Hohler (born 1 March 1943) is a Swiss author and cabaret performer based in Zürich.

== Life ==
Hohler in 1974

Hohler is the author of one-man programs and satirical programs for television and radio. He has written theater pieces, children's books, stories and novels. In 1993, he narrated the Swiss documentary film, Der Kongress der Pinguine. In 2002, he received the Kassel Literary Prize for Grotesque Humor, in 2005 the Art Prize of Zurich, in 2014 the Johann-Peter-Hebel-Preis.

One of Hohler's most famous works is the "Totemügerli". It's a Swiss-German story based upon a fabulous creature, written to make fun of the particular dialect spoken in the Canton of Bern by using words sounding like the Bernese dialect but which aren't real words. His collection of witty short stories Der Stein (2011) features border-crossing between the realistic and the fantastic. It is humorous and thought-provoking.

== Work ==
=== Books (selected works) ===
- Wo? Luchterhand, Darmstadt und Neuwied 1975, ISBN 3-472-86413-3.
- Hin- und Hergeschichten. In co-operation with Jürg Schubiger. Nagel & Kimche, Zürich 1986, ISBN 3-312-00118-8.
- Das verspeiste Buch. Eine Fortsetzungsgeschichte (mit Bildern von Hans Traxler). Schöffling, Frankfurt 1996, ISBN 3-89561-051-8.
- Es klopft. Luchterhand, München 2007, ISBN 978-3-630-87266-7.
- Immer höher. AS Verlag 2014, ISBN 978-3-906055-19-0.
- Der Autostopper. Die kurzen Erzählungen. Luchterhand, München 2014, ISBN 978-3-630-87456-2.
- Ein Feuer im Garten. Luchterhand, München 2015, ISBN 978-3-630-87452-4.

== Literature ==
- Martin Hauzenberger: Franz Hohler. Römerhof Verlag 2015, ISBN 978-3-905894-33-2.
