= Johann Peter Hebel =

German writer (1760–1826)

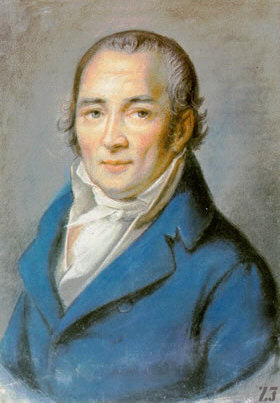
Portrait of Hebel by Philipp Jakob Becker

Johann Peter Hebel (10 May 1760 – 22 September 1826) was a German short story writer, dialectal poet, Lutheran theologian and pedagogue, most famous for a collection of Alemannic lyric poems (Allemannische Gedichte) and one of German tales (Schatzkästlein des rheinischen Hausfreundes – "Treasure Chest of Rhenish Tales").

Born in Basel, Hebel entered primary school in 1766 and joined a Latin school three years later; he visited the schools in Basel during summer and in Hausen and Schopfheim respectively in the nearby Wiesental during winter. After the death of his mother in 1773, he remained at school, graduating with the help of friends from the Gymnasium Illustre of Karlsruhe in 1778 and going on to study theology. He became a home tutor, an assistant preacher, an assistant teacher, a subdeacon and, in 1798, a professor and court deacon.

Hebel was interested in botany, natural history and other subjects. His literary work began with Allemannische Gedichte, which is perhaps the most popular work written in Alemannic. He had success with his calendar stories in the Badischer Landkalender, and later with Rheinländischer Hausfreund (Rhenish Family Treasury), but a dispute between Catholics forced him to resign as editor of the calendar. In his last years he devoted himself increasingly to religion, becoming a prelate in 1819, but his wish to become a parish priest was never fulfilled. His last works were biblical stories for young readers, which served as textbooks until 1855. Hebel died 1826 in Schwetzingen. Goethe, Tolstoy, Gottfried Keller, Hermann Hesse, Martin Heidegger and other writers have praised his works.

== Early life ==
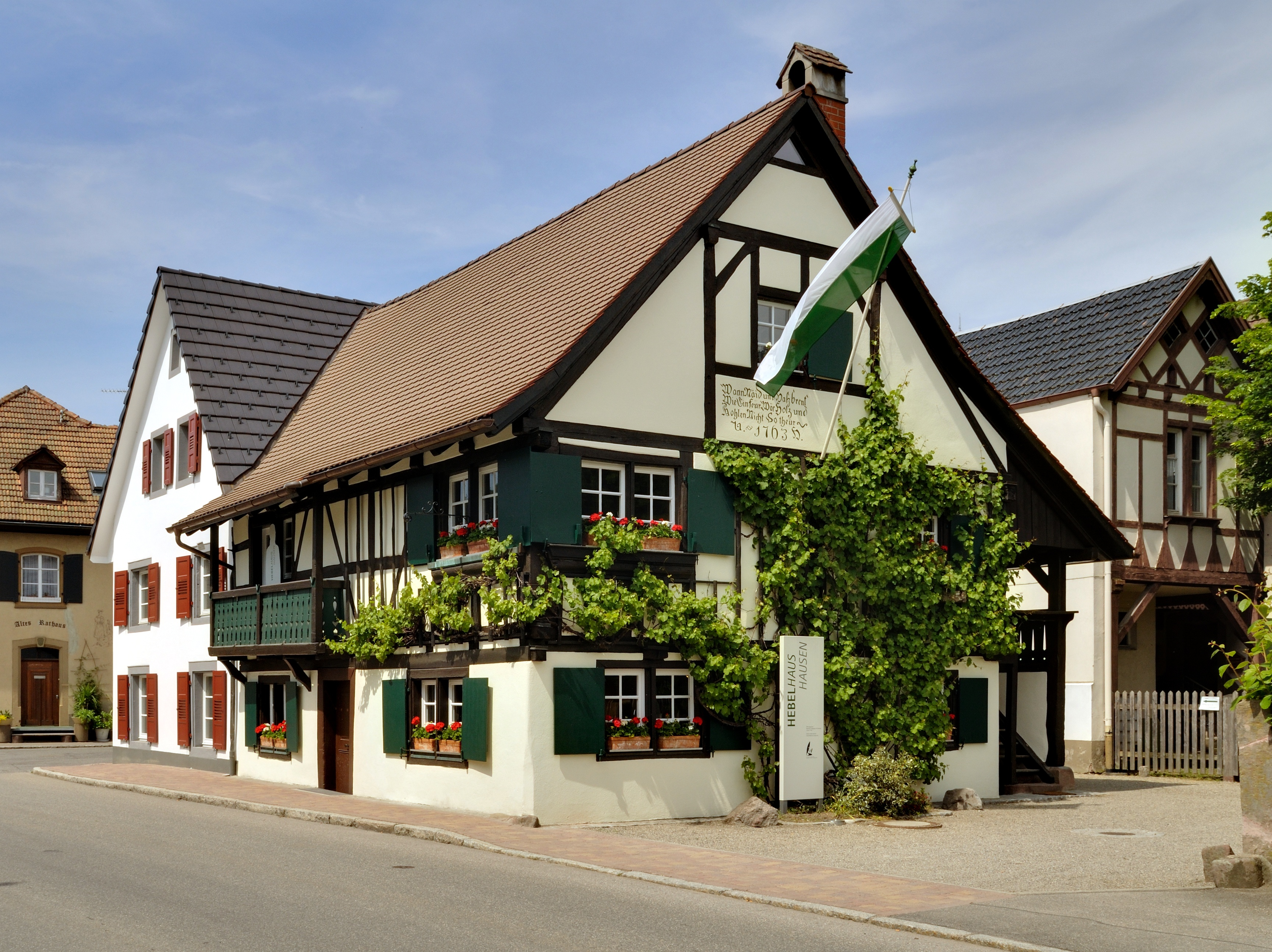
The "Hebelhuus", the native house of Johann Peter Hebel in Hausen i.W.

Johann Peter Hebel was born on 10 May 1760 in Basel, where his parents were employed in a patrician household during the summer. He spent half of his childhood in Basel and the other half in the village of Hausen im Wiesental, where his father worked as a weaver during the winters. As he wrote in an autobiographical sketch, "there I learned early on what it meant to be poor and rich ... to have nothing and to have everything, to be happy with the happy people and to be sad with those who cried". Memories of both places had a deep influence on his literary work. Hebel's father, who had moved to southern Baden from the Hunsrück area, died of typhus early in 1761, as did his younger sister, who was only a few weeks old. Hebel went to primary school in Hausen in 1766, and in 1769 went on to the Latin school in Schopfheim, where his teacher was the theologian August Gottlieb Preuschen. During the summer months he went to a parish school in Basel, and later to the prestigious cathedral school (Gymnasium am Münsterplatz). His mother died when he was thirteen.

In 1774, with financial help from friends, Hebel joined the Gymnasium Illustre in Karlsruhe (now the Bismarck-Gymnasium), where he graduated in 1778. After studying theology in Erlangen from 1778 to 1780, he became a home tutor and assistant preacher in Hertingen, Bad Bellingen, and was appointed Präzeptoratsvikar (assistant teacher) in 1783 at the Pädagogium in Lörrach, now called the Hebel-Gymnasium in his honour. He became friends with the headmaster, Tobias Günttert, and through him met Gustave Fecht, Günttert's sister-in-law, with whom he had a long-lasting, platonic relationship and to whom he sent numerous letters. Hebel remained unmarried all his life, although in later years he adored the actress Henriette Hendel-Schütz. In 1791 he returned to Karlsruhe to take up a position as a deacon at the Karlsruhe Gymnasium, but was instead only named a "subdeacon". Apart from teaching, Hebel occasionally preached at court, where he enjoyed great popularity.

== Later life ==
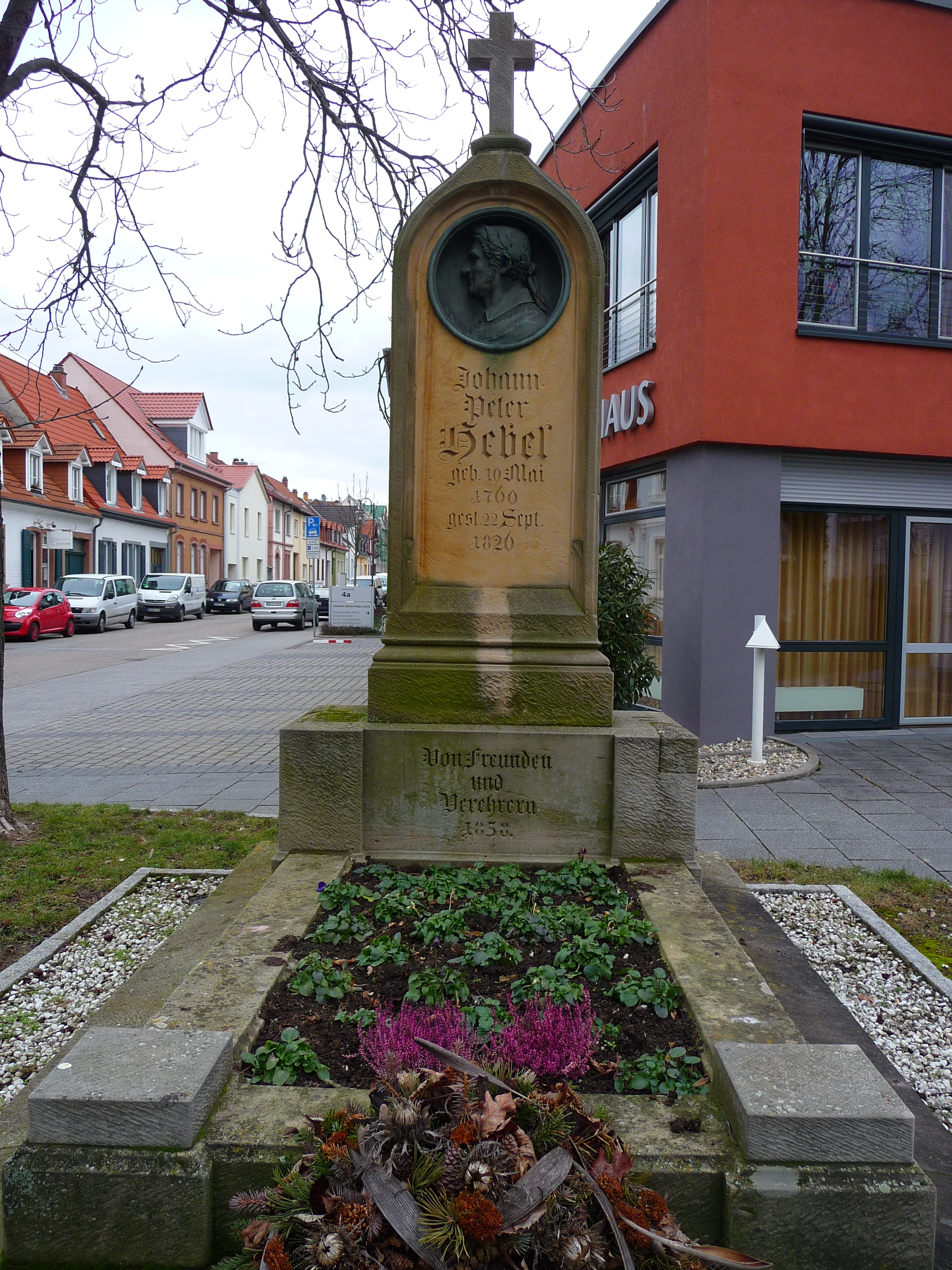
Gravesite in Schwetzingen

In 1798 Hebel became a professor and court deacon. He taught several other subjects in the Gymnasium, among them botany and natural history. He took a broad interest in botany; he maintained a herbarium and rearranged the botanical terms and diagnoses in Flora badensis alsatica, written by his friend, botanist Karl Christian Gmelin. In his honour, Gmelin named a plant Hebelia allemannica, though it was later renamed Tofieldia calyculata. Hebel became an honorary member of the mineralogical society in Jena in 1799, and three years later a corresponding member of the "Vaterländischen Gesellschaft der Ärzte und Naturforscher in Schwaben". In his youth he enjoyed the works of Klopstock and Jung-Stilling. Later he especially liked Jean Paul and Johann Heinrich Voß.

Hebel lived in Karlsruhe until his death, but made occasional journeys to other regions. His wish to become a parish priest in Wiesental was never fulfilled, though he wrote an inaugural sermon for a rural parish in 1820. In this sermon he wrote, "to live and die as a pastor in a peaceful country town, among honest people, has always been my sole wish, up to this hour; it was what I wished for in the happiest and in the darkest moments of my life". Instead, he was "led higher and higher by an invisible hand, ever further away from my modest goals". In 1805 he was offered the Lutheran parish of Freiburg im Breisgau, but he declined it at the behest of Charles Frederick, Grand Duke of Baden. He was rewarded in 1808 with his appointment as director of the Gymnasium in Karlsruhe. In 1819 he became a prelate of the Lutheran regional church, a leading position that brought with it a seat in the Upper House of the Parliament (Ständeversammlung) of Baden. As a member of parliament he devoted himself mainly to education, the church and social policy. He later gave a speech at the consecration of the statehouse in Karlsruhe. Even though the Lutheran and Reformed regional churches of Baden merged in 1821 with strong support from his side, into today's Evangelische Landeskirche in Baden, his position as the prelate of the unified Protestant church was not endangered.

Hebel's health deteriorated after 1815. In 1826 he travelled to Heidelberg and Mannheim to oversee school exams, and he died on 22 September 1826 in nearby Schwetzingen. His grave is there. Johannes Bähr succeeded him as prelate in the regional church of Baden.

== Writings ==
=== Allemannische Gedichte ===
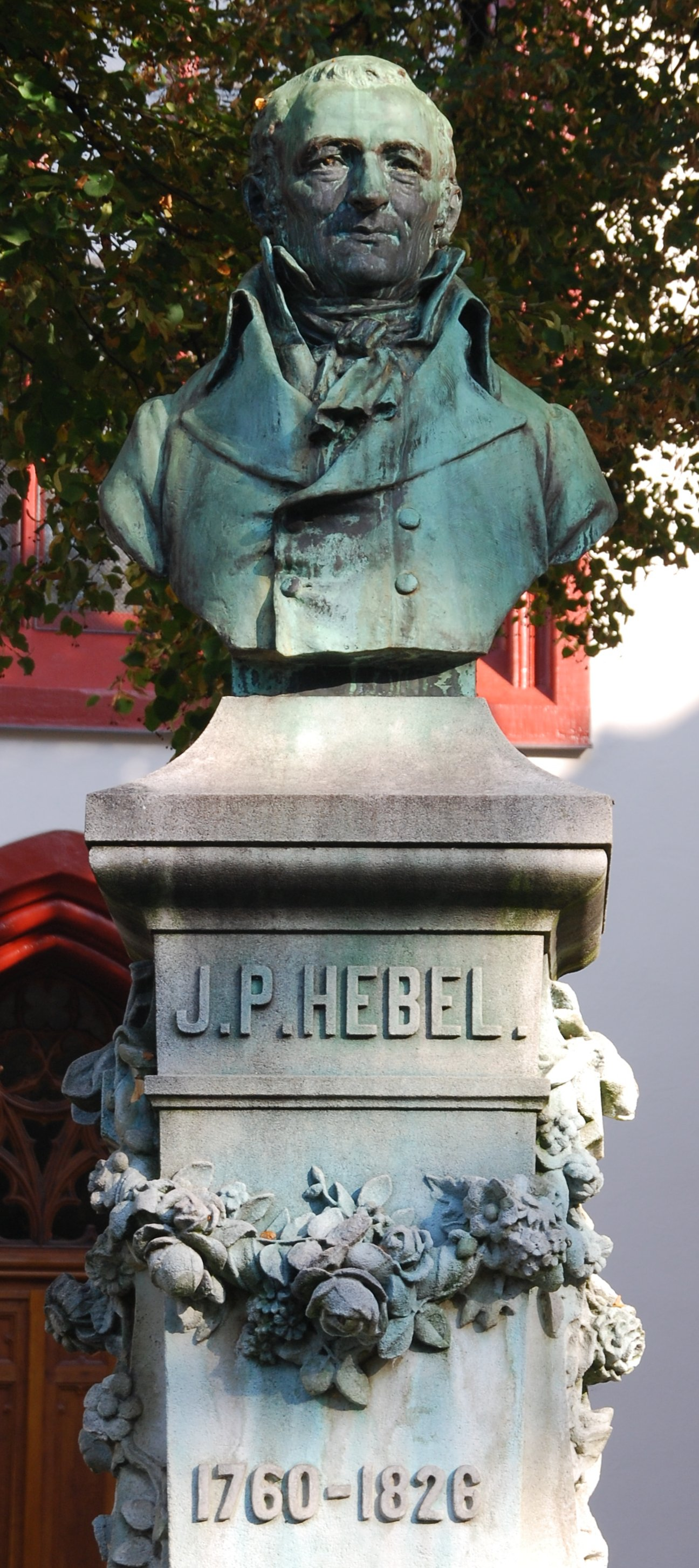
Memorial of Hebel by Max Leu, at the Peterskirche, Basel

Apart from a few early attempts, Hebel's began his literary work near the end of the 18th century. After returning to Karlsruhe from a trip to Wiesental in 1799, he began to write Allemannische Gedichte, inspired by a longing for his home. (Allemannische is the spelling he used; normally it has just one "l".) The 32 poems "for friends of the rural way of life" were written in Alemannic, the local dialect of Wiesental. Hebel could not find a Basel publisher willing to produce the book in Alemannic, and the collection was only published in 1803 by Philip Macklot in Karlsruhe, after Hebel and his friends managed to collect enough advance subscriptions. The first edition was published anonymously, possibly because Hebel was concerned about getting a rustic image.

In Allemannische Gedichte, Hebel depicts the local life and customs of his homeland, with topics ranging from a description of the river Wiese, through praise of the Breisgau area, to his work in the ironworks in Hausen. Perhaps the most famous poem is "Die Vergänglichkeit", a dialogue in blank verse about death, in which the father (Alemannic: Ätti) tells his son (Bueb) a story based on Rötteln Castle, about how a glorious town like Basel will decline – and likewise the whole world. Hebel also included his experience of his mother's death: the conversation between Ätti and Bueb takes place in a cart on the street between Steinen and Brombach, where Hebel's mother had died.

Allemannische Gedichte was very successful, and a new edition was published a year later, this time crediting the author. When Hebel read the poems aloud to margrave Charles Frederick, the duke praised them, and Hebel noticed his exact local knowledge: "I am surprised how the margrave knew all the villages, every small place, every shrub and hedge from Utzenfeld to Lörrach, and could always say: this is this, and yes, that's how it is." In the following decades, further editions were released in Aarau, Vienna and Reutlingen. Famous poets such as Jean Paul (1803) and Goethe (1804) wrote reviews of the poems. Hebel was elated at this success and wrote in a letter: "In certain moments I feel all proud inside, and as if drunk with happiness, that I could make our otherwise despised and ridiculed language so classical and give it such artistic fame".

=== Calendar stories ===
Hebel's second famous work is his calendar stories, which he wrote from 1803 on for the Badische Landkalender and especially from 1807 for its successor, the Rheinländischer Hausfreund. This old Lutheran calendar was selling poorly in the early 19th century, and Hebel was a member of the commission appointed to suggest improvements. After several discussions, Hebel finally became editor of the new calendar, which was first released in 1807. One of the biggest improvements was to have more text, featuring "instructive news and funny stories". Hebel wrote about 30 of these stories each year, and they were highly successful. The Schatzkästlein des rheinischen Hausfreundes was issued in 1811 as a collection of the most interesting of these stories. Further editions followed in 1816 and 1827. The calendar stories included news, short stories, anecdotes, comical stories and modified fairy tales. They were intended both to entertain and to provide moral education. The best-known of Hebel's calendar stories are "Unverhofftes Wiedersehen" (unexpected reunion) and "Kannitverstan" (I cannot understand). The philosopher Ernst Bloch called the first "the most beautiful story of the world". There was a dispute in 1815, as Hebel's calendar story "Der fromme Rat" (pious advice), issued in 1814, was partially criticised by Catholics as being offensive, leading to its removal from the calendar. There he portrays a Catholic who prays to heaven instead of to the cross-bearing priest; the change can be viewed as a conversion of the Catholic to Protestantism. Hebel rounded off his story with the words: "The family friend knows to praise and venerate that, although he has never prayed to a rosary, else he would not write to the Lutheran calendar." Subsequently, Hebel resigned as editor and wrote far fewer calendar stories, except in 1819, when he wrote more than ever to make that year's issue of the Rheinländischer Hausfreund possible.

=== Bible stories ===
After the calendar stories, Hebel wrote Biblische Geschichten (Bible stories), a new school book for lutheran religious education. His criteria were that it should be clearly written and tell biblical stories in an exciting narrative style aimed at children from ten to fourteen. It took five years to write and was completed and released in 1824. It was used as a textbook until 1855.

== Reception and legacy ==
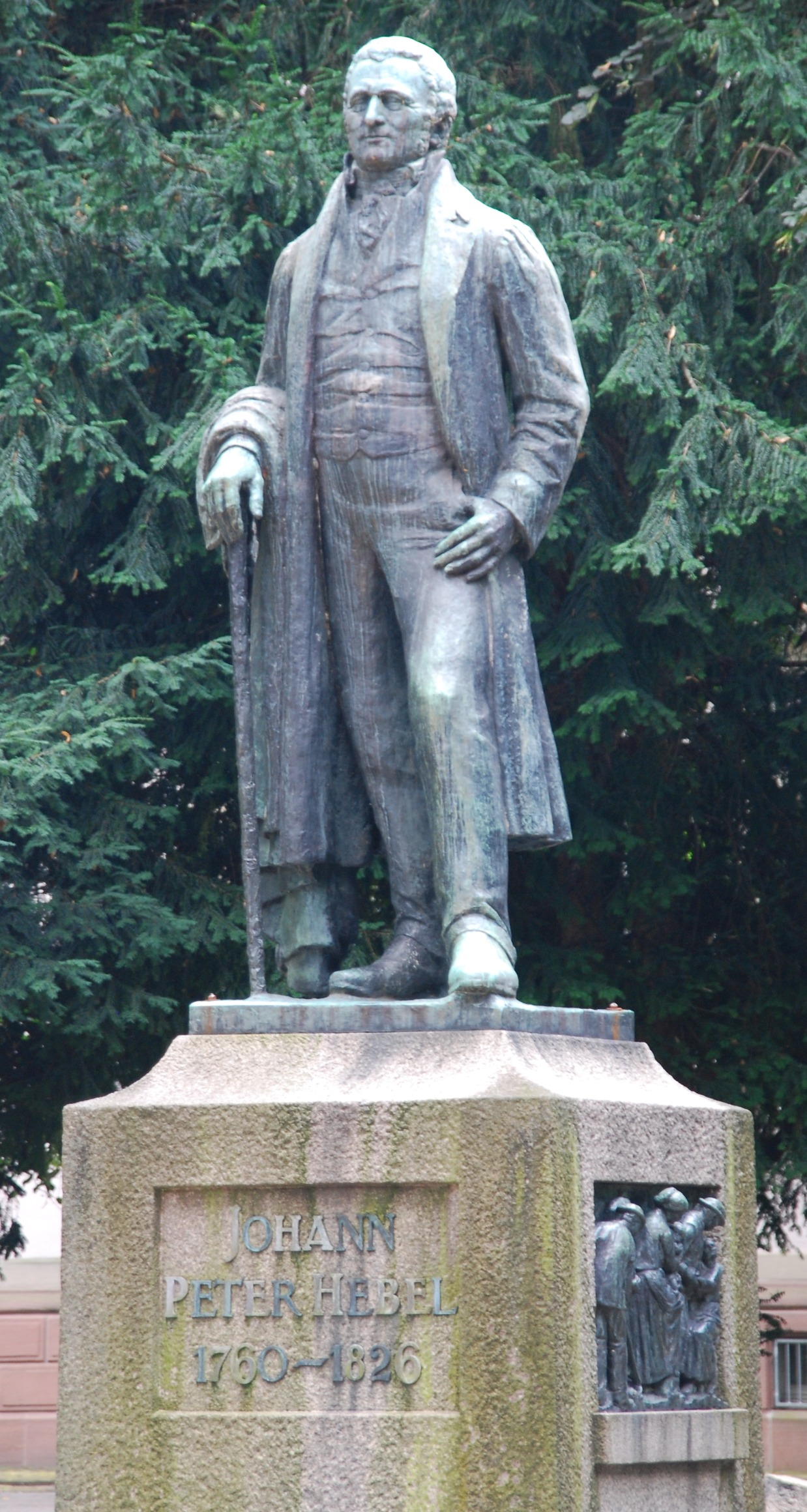
Memorial of Hebel by Wilhelm Gerstel in the Hebelpark, Lörrach

Hebel's admirers include Goethe, Gottfried Keller, Martin Heidegger, W. G. Sebald, Tolstoy, and Walter Benjamin. Goethe, who tried to write a poem (the "Schweizerlied", Swiss song) in Alemannic himself, praised the Allemannische Gedichte highly. According to him, Hebel "countrified the universe in the most naive, graceful fashion". But on the question of whether he would translate Hebel's works, Goethe said: "Such a great poet should be only read in the original! One just needs to learn this language!" The Brothers Grimm also admired Hebel, and he met Jacob Grimm in Karlsruhe in 1814. German composer Wilhelmine Schwertzell used Hebel’s text in her song “Wächteruf.”

Hebel's work reflects the links between popular culture and deeper ideas. August Vilmar, for example, praised Hebel's "Vergänglichkeit" (transience), saying that it gives the folk-like foreground a background not found in other poets who wrote folk idylls. Vilmar further emphasises Hebel's description of nature by the river Wiese, the poem "Sonntagsfrühe", and especially the stories of the Schatzkästlein: "In their mood, their deep and genuine feeling, the liveliness of their imagery, the stories are unsurpassable, and worth a whole cart-load of novels". Theodor Heuss praised Hebel's use of the native Alemannic language, not only for parody and vulgarity, but also to make it "a true tool of the poetic craft", and according to Heuss he created a work that "resonates with the durable, the valid, the eternal, the eternally human".

Later authors appreciated Hebel's work too. Hermann Hesse once commented, "As far as I know, in no literary history do we yet read that Hebel was the greatest German novelist, as great as Keller and more confident and purer and mightier in effect than Goethe." Theodor W. Adorno lauded his essay Die Juden as "one of the most beautiful German prose plays in defence of the Jews". In Die gerettete Zunge, Geschichte einer Jugend, Elias Canetti described the influence that Hebel's Schatzkästlein had on him: "I never wrote a book, but that I did not secretly aspire to his style, and I began by writing everything in shorthand, the knowledge of which I owe to him alone." Marcel Reich-Ranicki wrote, "Hebel's stories are among the most beautiful in the German language", and included the "Schatzkästlein" and "Die Rose" in his Kanon Deutscher Literatur. The first was also listed in the ZEIT-Bibliothek der 100 Bücher.

The Johann-Peter-Hebel-Preis was endowed in 1936 in honour of Hebel. The 10,000-euro prize is awarded every two years to writers, translators, essayists, media representatives or scientists from the German district of Baden-Württemberg who write in Alemannic or are connected with Hebel. The prizegiving ceremony takes place in Hausen im Wiesental, which is also home to the Hebelfest every 10 May. The community of Hausen also awards the annual Johann-Peter-Hebel-Plakette to personalities from the Upper Rhine.

The Lörracher Pädagogium was renamed the Hebel-Gymnasium in 1926. Several Gymnasien in Pforzheim and Schwetzingen were named after him. Basic schools, in Essen, Berlin and especially Südbaden bear his name, as do numerous German streets. Monuments to Hebel are found in the Karlsruhe Palace, in Basel, Hausen and in the Hebelpark Lörrach. The Hebelbund Lörrach, Müllheim and the Basler Hebelstiftung are dedicated to his life and work.

== Bibliography ==
First illustration for Der Morgenstern from the Allemannische Gedichte

- Allemannische Gedichte. Für Freunde ländlicher Natur und Sitten. Karlsruhe, 1803, anonymous (second edition in 1804 with author statement)
  - Allemannische Gedichte. Für Freunde ländlicher Natur und Sitten. Poésies Alémaniques. Pour les amis de la nature et des mœurs rurales translation by Raymond Matzen. Alemannic/French bilingual edition, Kehl am Rhein: Morstadt Verlag 2010, ISBN 978-3-88571-362-3
- Der Rheinländische Hausfreund. Calendar stories for the years 1803–1811
  - Kalendergeschichten. Carl Hanser, Munich 1999
- Schatzkästlein des rheinischen Hausfreundes. Cotta, Stuttgart 1811 (compilation of the Kalendergeschichten with a few omissions and alterations)
  - Aus dem Schatzkästlein des Rheinischen Hausfreundes. With illustrations by K. F. Schulz. Furth im Wald: Vitalis 2001, ISBN 3-934774-93-8.
- Biblische Geschichten. Für die Jugend bearbeitet. Cotta, Stuttgart 1824
- Briefe. Herausgeber Wilhelm Zentner, 2 issues. Müller, Karlsruhe 1957
- Poetische Werke. Nach den Ausgaben letzter Hand und der Gesamtausgabe von 1834 unter Hinzuziehung der früheren Fassungen. Winkler, Munich 1961
- Excerpthefte, issued by Hans-Georg Schmidt-Bergmann and Julie Freifrau Haller von Gaertingen, Schriften des Museums für Literatur am Oberrhein, Karlsruhe 2010, ISBN 978-3-7650-8585-7

== Sources ==
- Val Scullion, Marion Treby & Hansjürg Baumgartner. "Reappraising Johann Peter Hebel - Unoriginal Innovator and Sophisticated German Man of Letters", Cambridge Scholars Publishing, Newcastle upon Tyne, 2026. ISBN 978-1-0364-7680-9
- Jacob Achilles Mähly (1880). "Hebel, Johann Peter" . Allgemeine Deutsche Biographie (in German). Vol. 11. Leipzig: Duncker & Humblot. pp. 188–195.
- (in German) Wilhelm Altwegg: Johann Peter Hebel, Verlag Huber, Frauenfeld and Leipzig 1935
- (in German) Basler Hebelstiftung: Johann Peter Hebel: Wesen, Werk, Wirkung. GS-Verlag, Basel 1990, ISBN 3-7185-0101-5.
- (in German) Richard Faber: Lebendige Tradition und antizipierte Moderne. Über Johann Peter Hebel. Verlag Königshausen und Neumann, Würzburg 2004. ISBN 3-8260-2991-7.
- (in German) Heide Helwig: Johann Peter Hebel. Biographie. Hanser-Verlag, Munich 2010, ISBN 978-3-446-23508-3.
- (in German) Franz Littmann: Johann Peter Hebel. Humanität und Lebensklugheit für jedermann. Sutton-Verlag, Erfurt 2008, ISBN 978-3-86680-332-9.
- (in German) Ralph Ludwig: Der Erzähler. Wie Johann Peter Hebel ein literarisches Schatzkästlein schuf. Wichern-Verlag, Berlin 2010, ISBN 978-3-88981-286-5.
- (in German) Norbert Oellers: "Johann Peter Hebel" in Benno von Wiese's: Deutsche Dichter der Romantik, 2., überarbeitete Auflage, pp. 57–87, Berlin, 1983
- (in German) Carl Pietzcker: zu Hause, aber daheim nicht. Hebelstudien. Königshausen & Neumann, Würzburg 2010, ISBN 978-3-8260-4360-4.
- (in German) Hansgeorg Schmidt-Bergmann and Franz Littmann: Johann Peter Hebel- Glück und Verstand: Minutenlektüren, Hoffmann & Campe, Hamburg 2009, ISBN 3-455-40232-1.
- (in German) Wilfried Setzler: Mit Johann Peter Hebel von Ort zu Ort: Lebensstationen des Dichters in Baden-Württemberg. Silberburg-Verlag, Tübingen 2010, ISBN 978-3-87407-866-5.
- (in German) Rainer Wunderlich Verlag: Über Johann Peter Hebel, Rainer Wunderlich Verlag, Tübingen 1964
- (in German) Bernhard Viel: Johann Peter Hebel oder Das Glück der Vergänglichkeit. Eine Biographie. C. H. Beck, Munich 2010, ISBN 978-3-406-59836-4.
