= Tages-Anzeiger =

Swiss daily newspaper

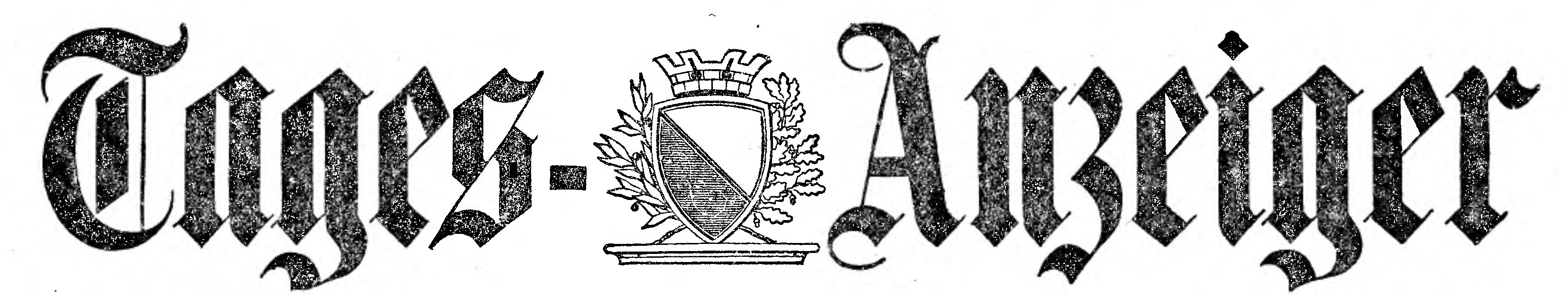
- Type: National daily newspaper
- Format: Broadsheet
- Owner(s): Tamedia (TX Group)
- Founder: Wilhelm Girardet
- Editor: Arthur Rutishauser
- Founded: 1893; 133 years ago
- Language: German
- Headquarters: Zurich
- Country: Switzerland
- Circulation: 203,636 (2010)
- ISSN: 1422-9994
- OCLC number: 611600527
- Website: www.tagesanzeiger.ch

Tages-Anzeiger (German: [ˈtaːɡəs ˈʔantsaɪɡɐ]), also abbreviated Tagi or TA, is a Swiss German-language national daily newspaper published in Zurich, Switzerland.

== History and profile ==
The paper was first published under the name Tages-Anzeiger für Stadt und Kanton Zürich in 1893. The founder was a German, Wilhelm Girardet. Its current name, Tages-Anzeiger, was adopted later. The paper is based in Zurich and is published in broadsheet. Its owner and publisher is Tamedia and its editor is Res Strehle. Although Tages-Anzeiger is a national newspaper, it focuses mainly on the Zurich region.

=== Circulation ===
The circulation of Tages-Anzeiger was 70,000 copies in 1910. It rose to 83,000 copies in 1930 and to 116,000 copies in 1950. In 1967 the paper was the best-selling newspaper with a circulation of 161,000 copies.

In the period of 1995–1996 Tages-Anzeiger had a circulation of 282,222 copies, making it the second best-selling paper in the country. In 1997 its circulation was 283,139 copies. The circulation of the paper was 280,000 copies in 2000.

Tages-Anzeiger sold 268,000 copies in 2001. Its 2003 circulation was 235,000 copies, making it the second best selling newspaper in the country. In 2005 the paper had a circulation of 236,000 copies. The circulation of the paper was 225,287 copies in 2006. In 2008 the circulation of Tages-Anzeiger was 216,000 copies, making it the second best-selling newspaper in the country. In 2009 the paper sold 209,297 copies. It was 203,636 copies in 2010.

=== Political stance ===
Tages-Anzeiger is the first Swiss newspaper with no political affiliation. Although politically and economically independent, the newspaper's political stance is generally characterized as center-left.

=== Format and sections ===
Tages-Anzeiger is published in broadsheet format. The newspaper consists of a number of sections, the first of which is dedicated to domestic and international news as well as economic news. The second section features regional news and sports while the third section covers culture and society. Occasionally, special sections are added to cover major events such as elections.

==== Special sections ====
Special sections are added to the paper on different days of the week:

- Thursdays – Züritipp, an overview of the nightlife and going-out tips as well as cultural events for the week (replaces the cinema and theatre guide in the daily culture section)
- Saturdays – Alpha, specialist and leadership jobs
- Saturdays – Das Magazin (see below)

==== Das Magazin ====
Das Magazin (English: The Magazine) is a supplement to the newspaper's Saturday edition. Added in 1970, it mainly features comments and reports on politics and culture. Patterned after The New York Times Magazine, the magazine employs a style and language of its own.

In its early years, the magazine featured articles by writers including Niklaus Meienberg, Peter Bichsel and Laure Wyss, and, as a bastion of journalistic enlightenment in the 1970s, it heavily defined cultural and political discourse in Switzerland.

In 2005, it was added to two other newspapers, the Basler Zeitung and the Berner Zeitung, reaching around 730,000 readers each weekend (approximately ten percent of the Swiss population). Its main competitor is the weekly Die Weltwoche magazine.

Schweizer Bibliothek

In 2005 and 2006, the magazine published the "Schweizer Bibliothek" – a compilation of twenty books, written by twenty of the 20th century's most important Swiss writers.

- Volume 1: Friedrich Glauser, Matto regiert (1936)
- Volume 2: Markus Werner, Bis bald (1992)
- Volume 3: Alice Rivaz, Schlaflose Nacht (1979, original title: Jette ton pain), German translation by Markus Hediger
- Volume 4: Max Frisch, Der Mensch erscheint im Holozän (1979)
- Volume 4: Ruth Schweikert, Erdnüsse. Totschlagen (1994)
- Volume 6: Friedrich Dürrenmatt, Der Verdacht (1953)
- Volume 7: Gertrud Leutenegger, Vorabend (1975)
- Volume 8: Niklaus Meienberg, St. Fiden – Paris – Oerlikon (1972–1992)
- Volume 9: Peter Weber, Der Wettermacher (1993)
- Volume 10: Nicolas Bouvier, Der Skorpionsfisch (1981, Originaltitel: Le Poisson-scorpion), German translation by Barbara Erni
- Volume 11: Thomas Hürlimann, Das Gartenhaus (1989)
- Volume 12: Agota Kristof, Das grosse Heft (1986, original title: Le grand cahier), German translation by Eva Moldenhauer
- Volume 13: Hugo Loetscher, Der Immune (1975)
- Volume 14: Adolf Muschg, Liebesgeschichten (1972)
- Volume 15: Urs Widmer, Der blaue Siphon (1992)
- Volume 16: Robert Walser, Der Gehülfe (1908)
- Volume 17: Peter Bichsel, Die Jahreszeiten (1967)
- Volume 18: Blaise Cendrars, Moloch. Das Leben des Moravagine (1926, original title: Moravagine), German translation by Giò Waeckerlin Induni
- Volume 19: Fleur Jaeggy, Die seligen Jahre der Züchtigung (1989, original title: I beati anni del castigo), German translation by Barbara Schaden
- Volume 20: Gerhard Meier, Der schnurgerade Kanal (1977)

== See also ==
- List of national newspapers
