= Schweizer Bibliothek =

Compilation of Swiss literature

Schweizer Bibliothek ("Swiss Library") is a twenty-volume compilation of Swiss books, published in 2005/2006. The wide assortment of writers from all around the country is intended to represent 20th century Swiss literature by showcasing twenty of the most important Swiss writers.

The collection was compiled by Das Magazin, a weekend supplement-style magazine enclosed with the Saturday editions of several newspapers (namely Tages-Anzeiger (Zürich), Basler Zeitung, Berner Zeitung and Solothurner Tagblatt).

Readings with famous international writers including Salman Rushdie and Ian McEwan were organized at the same time

== Production and Editing of the volumes ==
One volume was issued every two weeks between 9 December 2005 and the middle of May 2006. The compilation was selected by different experts including Peter von Matt, Corina Caduff, Werner Morlang, Peter Utz, Stefan Zweifel, and by the reviewers of the newspapers involved (e.g. Basler Zeitung, Berner Zeitung, Tages-Anzeiger).

The hardback books are high-grade and of simple design by graphic designer Ludovic Balland (studio "The Remingtons"). They feature no cover pictures, but can be identified from the big colored titles, punched into the front covers.

== The 20 books ==
1. Friedrich Glauser: Matto regiert (In Matto's Realm, 1936)
2. Markus Werner: Bis bald (1992)
3. Alice Rivaz: Schlaflose Nacht (Jette ton pain, original in 1979), translated by Markus Hediger
4. Max Frisch: Der Mensch erscheint im Holozän (Man in the Holocene, 1979)
5. Ruth Schweikert: Erdnüsse, Totschlagen (1994)
6. Friedrich Dürrenmatt: Der Verdacht (Suspicion (novel), 1953)
7. Gertrud Leutenegger: Vorabend (Buch) (1975)
8. Niklaus Meienberg: St. Fiden Paris Oerlikon (1972–1992, Reportagensammlung)
9. Peter Weber: Der Wettermacher (1993)
10. Nicolas Bouvier: Der Skorpionsfisch (Le Poisson-scorpion published 1981 in German, translated by Barbara Erne)
11. Thomas Hürlimann: Das Gartenhaus (1989. English = The Couple)
12. Agota Kristof: Das grosse Heft (1986 original Le grand cahier, English = "the notebook"), translated by Eva Moldenhauer
13. Hugo Loetscher: Der Immune (1975)
14. Adolf Muschg: „Liebesgeschichten“ (1972)
15. Urs Widmer: Der blaue Siphon (1992)
16. Robert Walser: Der Gehülfe (1918)
17. Peter Bichsel: Die Jahreszeiten (1967)
18. Blaise Cendrars: Moloch. Das Leben des Moravagine (1926), (Moravagine, translated by Lotte Frauendienst)
19. Fleur Jaeggy: Die seligen Jahre der Züchtigung (I beati anni del castigo, published 1989 in German, translated by Barbara Schaden)
20. Gerhard Meier: Der schnurgerade Kanal (1977)
