= Helvetism =

Features distinctive of Swiss Standard German that distinguish it from Standard German

Helvetisms (Neo-Latin Helvetia "Switzerland" and -ism) are features distinctive of the varieties of language spoken in Switzerland, most notably in Swiss Standard German, where they distinguish it from Standard German. The most frequent Helvetisms in German occur in vocabulary and pronunciation, but there are also some distinctive features in syntax and orthography. The French and Italian spoken in Switzerland have similar terms, which are also known as Helvetisms. Current French dictionaries, such as the Petit Larousse, include several hundred helvetisms.

The term Helvetism has also been used in broader cultural and historical contexts, particularly in reference to Swiss literary and intellectual currents from the 18th century onward. In this sense, it has denoted expressions of national identity and unity across linguistic and regional boundaries, often linked to movements emphasizing Swiss values, independence, and supracantonal solidarity.

== Background ==
The definitive work for German orthography, the Duden, explicitly declares a number of helvetisms as correct Standard German – albeit with the [schweiz.] annotation, denoting that the usage of the word is limited to Switzerland. However, not all words may be considered part of the "Swiss standard language"/"Swiss standard German" category, because frequency of usage must be evaluated as well; if this does not apply, or if a word's use is known to span only one or more specific dialectal regions, the word must be categorized "dialectal" (German: mundartlich, often abbreviated mdal.)

In orthographical terms, the most significant difference to Standard German outside Switzerland is the absence of ß (eszett). (After having been officially abandoned in the Canton of Zürich in 1935, this character gradually fell into disuse, until it was eventually dropped by the Neue Zürcher Zeitung in 1974.)

In everyday language, Helvetisms may be used both consciously and unconsciously by a Swiss German native speaker. Classic examples of Helvetism usage throughout entire literary works are found in a large part of Swiss literature, notably Jeremias Gotthelf's novels located in the Emmental; a contemporary example would be Tim Krohn in his Quatemberkinder. Another group, the most notable of whom is Peter Bichsel, deliberately use Helvetisms to arouse a sort of emotional attachment to the readers' home country: Bichsel is notorious for using dialectal words like Beiz (instead of Kneipe [English: "pub"]), or Kasten (instead of Schrank [English: "cupboard/cabinet/closet"]) in his "San Salvador" short story. Lastly, there is yet another group of authors whose readers are known to be located all over the German-speaking territory (Germany, Austria, Switzerland as well as some smaller minorities in other European countries) and therefore traditionally refrain from using any Helvetisms in their literary works.

In addition, words which are used outside Switzerland, but which originate from Swiss German may be called "Helvetisms".

Analogously to "Helvetisms", there are also Austricisms and Germanisms (also Teutonicisms).

== Examples of Helvetisms ==
=== Figures of speech ===
- mit abgesägten Hosen dastehen (den kürzeren gezogen haben, being in an unlucky and hopeless situation)
- aus Abschied und Traktanden (fallen) (außer Betracht fallen, when a thing doesn't matter anymore)
- es macht den Anschein (es hat den Anschein, it seems)
- in den Ausgang gehen (ausgehen, going out)
- von Auge (mit bloßem Auge, by naked eye)
- ausjassen (aushandeln, bargaining something/negotiating)
- von Beginn weg (von Beginn an, from the beginnings)
- ab Blatt (spielen) (vom Blatt spielen/ohne Übung, to read music a prima vista, i. e., to play the notes directly from the sheet without having practiced)
- bachab schicken (etwas verwerfen, refusing or dismiss something, e.g., a project)
- Einsitz nehmen (Mitglied in einem Gremium werden, becoming a member of a gremium)
- dastehen wie der Esel am Berg (dastehen wie der Ochse vorm Berg, getting stuck and perplexed by an unexpected situation)
- die Faust im Sack machen (die Faust in der Tasche ballen, holding back/hiding aggression)
- innert nützlicher Frist (angemessen schnell, in a quick way)
- das Fuder überladen (des Guten zuviel tun, doing too much)
- handkehrum (andererseits, on the other hand)
- Hans was Heiri (Jacke wie Hose, when two things result in the same or are the same; either way)
- es hat (es gibt, there are)
- sein Heu nicht auf derselben Bühne haben mit (nicht dieselben Ansichten haben wie, to not find somebody's personality very appealing, having other interests/attitudes)
- jemandem geht der Knopf auf (jemandem geht ein Licht auf, suddenly getting an idea to solve a problem; "a light bulb goes up")
- den Rank finden (eine Lösung finden, finding a solution)
- zu reden geben (für Gesprächsstoff sorgen, a thing being controversial, being much discussed)
- kein Schleck (kein Honigschlecken, no picnic)
- neben den Schuhen stehen (falsch liegen/sich nicht wohl fühlen in seiner Haut, to not feel well in a situation)
- es streng haben (viel zu tun haben, having a lot of work)
- in Tat und Wahrheit (in Wirklichkeit, the truth is...)
- einen Tolggen im Reinheft haben (einen (Schönheits-) Fehler haben, having one single flashy mistake)
- gut tönen (gut klingen/vielsprechend sein, sounding good/interesting)
- gut schmecken (gut riechen, to smell good; the literal translation would be tasting good)
- keinen Wank tun/machen (sich nicht rühren, to be still, not moving)
- es wird sich weisen (es wird sich zeigen, the future will show it)
- werweisen (hin und her raten or sich nicht entscheiden können, guessing without a clue, or not being decisive)
- Jetzt ist genug Heu unten (Jetzt reicht es!, enough!)
- (etwas) versorgen (einräumen put something into [e.g. a cupboard or a cabinet]; in Standard German, versorgen means to attend to someone)

=== Swiss specifics ===
In the area's cuisine, local culture and politics, there are numerous peculiarities that are not well known outside Switzerland and which do not have an equivalent standard German expression.

- Cuisine: Älplermagronen (meal with cut potatoes, Hörnli (Pipette Rigate), cream and melted cheese, Basler Läckerli, Gnagi, Kaffee fertig (coffee with schnaps)
- Local culture: Hornussen (a native throwing game, especially in the Canton of Bern), der/das Nouss ("dish" used in Hornussen), Schwingen (a kind of ring fight), Schwinget (tournament for said ring fight)
- State: Gemeindeversammlung (gathering of the voting community), Halbkanton (half-canton), Initiative, Landsgemeinde, Ständerat, Ständemehr, Vernehmlassung

== Pronunciation ==
Because of their characteristic pronunciation, speakers of Swiss Standard German will be instantly recognized by other German speakers in most cases.

In general, the pronunciation of Swiss Standard German is influenced by the respective Swiss German dialect of each speaker. The degree of that influence may vary according to their education.

=== Stress ===
Swiss German exhibits a strong trend toward stressing all words on the initial syllable:

- Family names including a preposition (such as von) are accented on the preposition rather than on the following word.
- Acronyms are stressed on the first letter rather than the last.
- Many loanwords are stressed on the first syllable regardless of how they are pronounced in the original language. Examples include Apostroph, Billet, Filet, Garage, Papagei, Portemonnaie and the exclamation Merci (thank you, borrowed from French).

=== Consonants ===
- /b d g z/ are voiceless lenes [b̥ d̥ ɡ̊ z̥]
- There is no final-obstruent devoicing.
- /v/ is pronounced as an approximant [ʋ]; in some words, it is replaced by a voiceless lenis [v̥], e.g. in Möve or Advent.
- Double consonants are often geminated, e.g. immer as [ˈɪmːər].
- Initial ⟨ch⟩ is pronounced as a [x], for instance in local names like Chur and Cham or in foreign words like China or Chemie, Chirurgie etc.
- The ending ⟨-ig⟩ is pronounced [-ɪɡ̊], not [-ɪç], e.g. König [køːnɪɡ̊] 'king'
- ⟨chs⟩ is pronounced [xs] or [çs], not [ks], e.g. Dachs as [daxs] or sechs as [z̥ɛçs] 'six'.
- ⟨r⟩ is not vocalized (that is, SSG is rhotic). In Switzerland, Vater 'father' is pronounced [ˈfaːtər] and not [ˈfaːtɐ].
- In Switzerland (except the eastern part and Basel-Stadt) the alveolar [r] is more usual than the uvular [ʀ] or [ʁ].
- There is often no glottal stop which in other varieties of German is present at start of vowel-initial words.
- For some speakers, /x/ is always pronounced as [x], and not differentiated into [x] and [ç], e.g. in nicht [nɪxt] instead of [nɪçt] 'not'.
- For some speakers, /k/ is pronounced as velar affricate [k͡x], e.g. Kunst [k͡xʊnst].
- For a few, /st sp/ are pronounced [ʃt ʃp] instead of [st sp] in all positions, e.g. Ast as [aʃt] 'branch'.

=== Vowels ===
- Unstressed ⟨e⟩ is often not pronounced as schwa, but as [e] or [ɛ], e.g. Gedanke [ɡ̊ɛˈd̥aŋkɛ] or [ɡ̊eˈd̥aŋke] 'thought'.
- ⟨ä⟩ is usually pronounced as an open [æ] like in English "hat", "patch".
- Depending on the dialect, ⟨a⟩ may be pronounced as a back [ɑ]).
- Depending on the dialect, short vowels may be pronounced more closed, e.g. Bett [b̥et] instead of [b̥ɛt] 'bed', offen [ˈofən] instead of [ˈɔfən] 'open', Hölle [hølːe] instead of [ˈhœlːe] 'hell'.
- Depending on the dialect, long vowels may be pronounced more open, e.g. See [z̥ɛː] instead of [ˈz̥eː] 'lake', schon [ʃɔːn] instead of [ʃoːn] 'already', schön [ʃœːn] instead of [ʃøːn] 'beautiful'.

=== Prosody ===
A special feature of Swiss Standard German is a somewhat "singing" cadence: Each word's stressed syllable is marked not only through higher voice volume, but also through a modification of the voice's sound. In general, the pitch of the stressed syllable sinks.

- In the announcement Profitieren Sie! (Benefit!) in shopping malls' transmissions, the pitch sinks from pro- to -fi-, until it has reached the deepest point at -tie-; at -ren and Sie the voice approximately reaches its original pitch again.

== Orthography ==
In orthography, the most visible difference from Standard German usage outside Switzerland is the absence of ß (officially abolished in the Canton of Zürich in 1935; the sign fell gradually out of use and was dropped by the Neue Zürcher Zeitung (NZZ) in 1974).

French and Italian loanwords are written in their original forms in spite of the spelling reform. Majonäse stays Mayonnaise, and Spagetti stays Spaghetti. The NZZ uses the spelling placieren (to place, from French placer) rather than platzieren, which is more common elsewhere.

Geographical names, such as streets, are mostly written together: Baslerstrasse, Genfersee, Zugerberg etc. Compound terms relating to nationality are often written as one word, such as Schweizergrenze ("Swiss border") and Schweizervolk (Swiss people) instead of Schweizer Grenze and Schweizer Volk. The names of municipalities, towns, stations, and streets are often not written with a starting capital umlaut, but instead with Ae, Oe and Ue, such as the Zürich suburb Oerlikon, or the hamlet Aetzikofen, or the Bernese municipality Uebeschi. However, field names, such as Äbenegg, Ötikon (near Stäfa), or Überthal, and any other word, such as Ärzte (English: physicians), usually start with capital umlauts. Finally, there are specialities like e.g. Bretzel instead of Brezel ("pretzel").

Some of the above-mentioned characteristics are due to the general introduction of the typewriter in economics and administration. Because a Swiss typewriter must be able to write not only German texts but also French and Italian texts, the limited number of keys was not enough for all these languages' special characters to be included. So, the eszett and the uppercase umlauts (Ä, Ö and Ü), as well as other upper-case accented vowels (e.g. À and É, used in French and Italian), were omitted.

== Syntax ==
Swiss German differs from Standard German in, for example, the gender of nouns (das E-Mail, das Tram and das SMS instead of die) or in the preposition that verbs require (jemanden anfragen instead of bei jemandem anfragen).

In general, more often than in Germany or Austria, the Swiss use expressly feminine nouns (Bundesrätin Ruth Metzler, Frieda U. wurde zur Primarschullehrerin gewählt) rather than the generic masculine (Bundesrat, Primarschullehrer etc.) to refer to occupations and positions held by women. The Binnen-I (as in ProfessorInnen) is standard in Switzerland but may be marked elsewhere as "politically correct".

Relative pronouns: The relative pronoun welche(r), considered clumsy and antiquated in Standard German, is used without hesitation: in Damit wurde in der Schweiz ein Kompetenzzentrum für Klimafragen geschaffen, welches verstärkt die Bedürfnisse der Bevölkerung in den Mittelpunkt ihrer Forschung stellt. (from Jahresbericht 2001, Annual report of the ETH Zürich).

=== Grammatical case ===
Rabatt is used in the dative case; in Standard German in the accusative case. Example: 20% Rabatt auf allen Artikeln.

=== Sentence structure ===
The syntax has many constructions with a shortened main clause and a following subordinate clause, which is only marked by the initial position of a verb, e.g.

- Gut, gibt es Schweizer Bauern. instead of Es ist gut, dass es Schweizer Bauern gibt.
- Schön, haben Sie heute Zeit. instead of (Es ist) schön, dass Sie heute Zeit haben.
- Schade, bist du gestern nicht hier gewesen. instead of (Es ist) schade, dass du gestern nicht hier gewesen bist.

== Grammatical gender ==
In his book Zündels Abgang, author Markus Werner uses Tram ("tram") – which takes the female article die in Germany's Standard German – with the typically Swiss neuter article das.

== Swiss expressions loaned into Standard German ==
The word Putsch is one example which is widely used in political contexts, even in notable Standard German newspapers. The word Müsli, however, is a special case: in Swiss Standard German (and only there), Müsli is the diminutive of Mus ("mouse") and stands for "little mouse". To describe the food, the Swiss use the spelling Müesli (reflecting the pronunciation [ˈmyəsli] of the dialects).

- Nature:
  - Gletscher (a glacier, in the Western Alps; in the East Alps a glacier is called a Ferner or Kees)
  - Gülle (liquid manure)
  - Lärche (larch)
  - Lawine (avalanche)
  - Murmeltier (marmot)
  - Senn (Alpine farmer)
- Politics:
  - Putsch (putsch, or coup d'état)
  - Reichsdeutsche (Germans living in the German Empire; this term was coined in 1871 by Swiss German-speaking people.)
  - Überfremdung (so-called "over-foreignization" of the country)
- conventions and customs:
  - Heimweh (homesickness; first described among Swiss soldiers who missed their homes in the Alps)
  - Vignette (automobile sticker verifying payment of a road tax)
- kitchen:
  - (Bircher-)Müesli (muesli, a breakfast food with cereals, milk, yogurt, and fruits)
  - Cordon bleu (breaded cutlet dish of traditionally veal or pork pounded thin and wrapped around a slice of ham and a slice of cheese, breaded, and then pan fried)
  - Fondue (fondue, a melted cheese dish)
  - Raclette (raclette, a melted cheese dish)
  - Bündnerfleisch (a seasoned, dried meat, also called Bindenfleisch or Viande des Grisons.)
- Other:
  - unentwegt (unflagging)

== See also ==
- Swiss German
- Standard German
- Swiss Standard German
