= Wilhelm Boeck =

German art historian

Wilhelm Boeck (21 May 1908 - 6 July 1998) was a German art historian.

== Early life and education ==
He was born in Giessen and from 1926 to 1931 studied classical archaeology and art history there and in Munich, Vienna and Berlin. He was a pupil of Edmund Hildebrandt and in 1929 won the Grimm Foundation Prize from the Humboldt University of Berlin.

== Career ==
He taught as a lecturer (from 1941) and an unscheduled professor (from 1948) at the University of Tübingen. After the Second World War he was "one of the first German art historians to engage successfully with Cézanne's art and Picasso's work", though he was marginalised by Tübingen professor Hubert Schrade.

His main area of expertise was Gothic sculpture, the early Renaissance in Italy, Baroque Germany and 20th century art. As well as Cézanne and Picasso, his work particularly focussed on the art of HAP Grieshaber, publishing the first ever monograph on Grieshaber in 1959, the same year as Boeck won the Bodensee-Literaturpreis.

== Honors and awards ==
In 1989, he was awarded the Order of Merit of Baden-Württemberg.

== Death and legacy ==
He died in Tübingen and his written estate is now held by the German Art Archive, part of the German National Museum in Nuremberg.

== Selected works ==
- Oberitalien und Toskana in der Kunst der Renaissance, Borna-Leipzig 1930 (Phil. Diss. Berlin 1929)
- Alte Berliner Kirchen, Atlantis-Verlag, Berlin 1937 (with Heinz Richartz)
- Oranienburg. Geschichte eines preußischen Königsschlosses, Berlin 1938
- Balthasar Permoser, Der Bildhauer des deutschen Barocks, August Hopfer Verlag, 1938
- Paolo Uccello. Der Florentiner Meister und sein Werk, Grote, Berlin 1939
- Alte Gartenkunst - Eine Stilgeschichte in Beispielen, L. Staackmann Verlag, Leipzig 1939
- Andrea Mantegna. Der Meister der oberitalienischen Frührenaissance, August Hopfer, 1942
- Deutsche Malerei des 20. Jahrhunderts, in: Moderne deutsche Kunst, Tübingen 1947
- Joseph Anton Feuchtmayer, Wasmuth, Tübingen 1948
- Der Hochaltar in Blaubeuren, Gesellschaft für Wissenschaftliches Lichtbild, München 1950
- Der Tiefenbronner Altar von Lucas Moser, Gesellschaft für Wissenschaftliches Lichtbild, München 1951
- Birnau am Bodensee, Hirmer, München 1953
- Pablo Picasso, mit einer Lebensbeschreibung von Jaime Sabartes. Kohlhammer, Stuttgart 1955
- HAP Grieshaber - Holzschnitte, Verlag Günther Neske, Pfullingen 1959
- Der Bamberger Meister. Mit Beiträgen von Urs Boeck, Katzmann-Verlag, Tübingen 1960
- Rembrandt, Kohlhammer, Stuttgart 1962
- Pablo Picasso - Linolschnitte, Hatje, Stuttgart 1962
- Der Bildhauer Philipp Harth, in: Philipp Harth - Plastiken und Zeichnungen, Mainz 1962
- Inkunabeln der Bildniskarikatur bei Bologneser Zeichnern des 17. Jahrhunderts, Verlag Gert Hatje, Stuttgart 1968
- Tiepolo-Zeichnungen in Stuttgart. In: Kunstchronik. Volume 24, 1971, S. 57–60.
- Picasso - Zeichnungen, DuMont Schauberg, Köln 1973
- Der Bildhauer, Altarbauer und Stukkateur Joseph Anton Feuchtmayer, Gessler, Friedrichshafen 1981.
