= DKA (disambiguation) =

DKA is diabetic ketoacidosis, a potentially life-threatening complication of diabetes mellitus.

DKA may also refer to:

- Katsina Airport (IATA code), Nigeria
- Delta Kappa Alpha, a professional cinema fraternity at the University of Southern California, US
- Dan Kearney and Associates, a fictional private investigation firm in the work of Joe Gores
- Deutsche Kunstarchiv, Nuremberg, art collection
- Dukuh Atas LRT station, a light rail station in Jakarta, Indonesia
- Dukuh Atas MRT station, a rapid transit station in Jakarta, Indonesia
