= Markus Hediger =

Swiss writer and translator (born 1959)

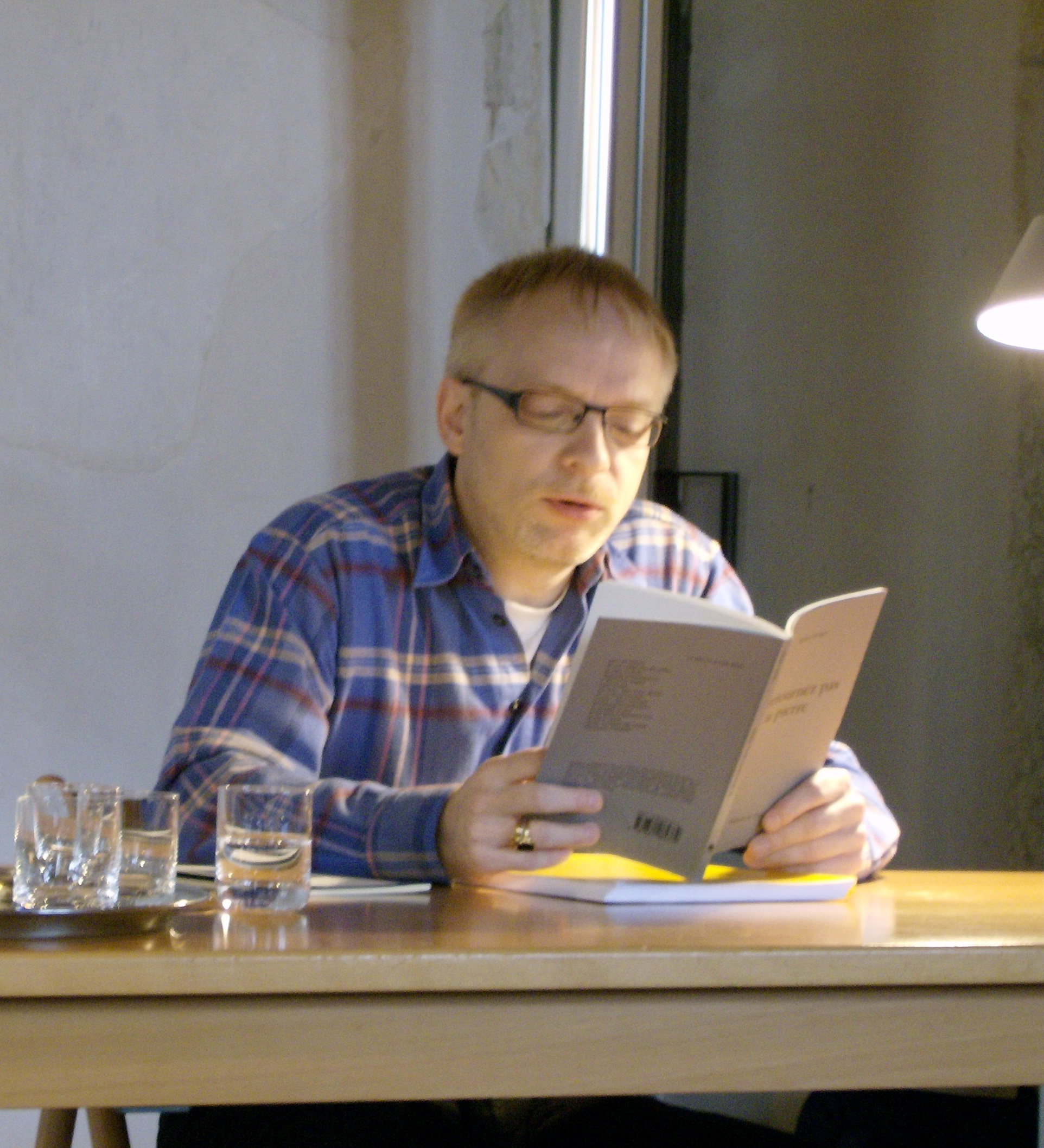
- Born: Markus Hediger; 31 March 1959; Zurich, Switzerland
- Education: University of Zurich
- Writing career
- Period: Late 20th century/Early 21st century
- Genres: Poetry, essays, translations

Markus Hediger (born 31 March 1959) is a Swiss writer and translator.

== Life ==
Markus Hediger was born in Zürich and brought up in Reinach, Aargau. From 1980 to 1990 he studied French literature, literary criticism and Italian literature at University of Zurich.

At the age of 16 he went to Paris for the first time. In 1979 he met there the Lebanese poet and playwright Georges Schehadé who opened to him new poetical horizons and whom he visited regularly until his death in 1989. In Switzerland he became friends with the writers Erika Burkart, Hugo Loetscher, Alice Rivaz and Walter Vogt.

In 1996 Markus Hediger published his first book of poetry, Ne retournez pas la pierre. This was followed by En deçà de la lumière in 2009 and Dans le cendrier du temps in 2022.

In 2011 he was invited to the International Poetry Festival of Rosario (Argentina), in 2014 to the International Poetry Festival of Medellín (Colombia) and in 2016 to the International Poetry Festival of Lima.

== Works ==
=== Poetry ===
- Ne retournez pas la pierre, romésie (1981–1995), Éditions de l'Aire, Vevey 1996 ISBN 2-88108-437-0
- Ne retournez pas la pierre – Dreht den Stein nicht um, Français – Deutsch (Audio CD), German translation by Yla Margrit von Dach, Arsmedia, Schöftland 1999 ISBN 3-909188-36-2
- Là pour me souvenir / Qui per ricordare (traduzione di Alberto Panaro e Grazia Regoli), selection of 17 poems in French and Italian translation. Lietocollelibiri, Faloppio 2005 ISBN 88-7848-154-8
- En deçà de la lumière, romésie II (1996–2007), Éditions de l'Aire, Vevey 2009 ISBN 2-88108-886-4
- Pour que quelqu'un de vous se souvienne (2008-2013), Alla Chiara Fonte, Viganello Lugano 2013
- L'or et l'ombre. Un seul corps, romésies I-III (1981-2016), foreword by René de Ceccatty, Éditions de l'Aire, L'Aire bleue, Vevey 2017 ISBN 9782-94058-612-7
- Dans le cendrier du temps, romésie III (2008-2021), Éditions de l'Aire, L'Aire bleue, Vevey 2022 ISBN 978-2-88956-222-0

=== Essay ===
- Les Après-midi de Georges Schehadé, in: Rencontre II, Éditions de l'Aire, Vevey 2009, ISBN 978-2-88108-900-8

=== Anthology ===
- Passagen – Erzählungen aus der französischen Schweiz 1970–1990. Benziger Verlag, Zürich 1991

=== Translations ===
- Jacques Mercanton: Der Verbannte von Grado (fr. La Sibylle). Italian short stories. Benziger, Zürich 1984
- Étienne Barilier: Die Katze Musica (fr. Musique). Novel. Benziger, Zürich 1991
- Bernard Comment: Diener des Wissens (fr. L’Ombre de mémoire). Novel. Benziger, Zürich 1992
- Alice Rivaz: Wolken in der Hand (fr. Nuages dans la main). Novel. Huber, Frauenfeld 1992
- Jacques Mercanton: Die Stunden des James Joyce (fr. Les Heures de James Joyce). Essay. Lenos, Basel 1993
- Yves Laplace: Ein vorbildlicher Mann (fr. Un Homme exemplaire). Novel. Lenos, Basel 1994
- Alice Rivaz: Schlaflose Nacht (fr. Jette ton pain). Novel. Lenos, Basel 1994
- Jacques-Étienne Bovard: Warum rauchen Sie, Monsieur Grin? (fr. La Griffe). Novel. Lenos, Basel 1996
- Élisabeth Horem: Der Ring (fr. Le Ring). Novel. Lenos Verlag, Basel 1996
- Yvette Z’Graggen: Matthias Berg (fr. Matthias Berg). Novel. Lenos, Basel 1997
- Alice Rivaz: Aus dem Gedächtnis, aus dem Vergessen (fr. De Mémoire et d’oubli). Short stories. Lenos, Basel 1997
- Yvette Z’Graggen: La Punta (fr. La Punta). Novel. Lenos, Basel 1999
- Alice Rivaz: Wie Sand durch die Finger (fr. Comme le sable). Novel. Lenos, Basel 2000
- Alice Rivaz: Das Wellental (fr. Le Creux de la vague). Novel. Lenos, Basel 2001
- Rose-Marie Pagnard: Judiths Vermächtnis (fr. La Leçon de Judith). Short story. Lenos, Basel 2002
- Jean-Bernard Vuillème: Mit dem Gesicht zum Rücken (fr. Face à dos). Novel. Lenos, Basel 2003
- Yvette Z’Graggen: Die Hügel (fr. Les Collines). Short story. Lenos, Basel 2004
- Nicolas Bouvier: Aussen und innen (fr. Le Dehors et le dedans). Poems. Lenos, Basel 2005
- Yvette Z'Graggen: Weiher unter Eis (fr. Un Etang sous la glace). Novel. Lenos, Basel 2006
- Yvette Z’Graggen: Lebenssplitter (fr. Eclats de vie). Lenos. Basel 2008
- Claire Krähenbühl: Ailleurs peut-être / Vielleicht anderswo. Poetry anthology 1991–2010. Wolfbach, Zurich 2013
- Pierre-Alain Tâche, Dire adieu / Abschied nehmen, Zurich, Wolfbach Verlag, 2017
