= Lenos =

Lenos Verlag – founded in 1970 – is a Swiss publisher with a focus on literature from Arab countries as well as from Switzerland. Some of its better known authors are: Alaa Al Aswany, Ibrahim Al-Koni or Nicolas Bouvier, Alice Rivaz and Annemarie Schwarzenbach.
