= Niklaus Meienberg =

Swiss writer and journalist (1940–1993)

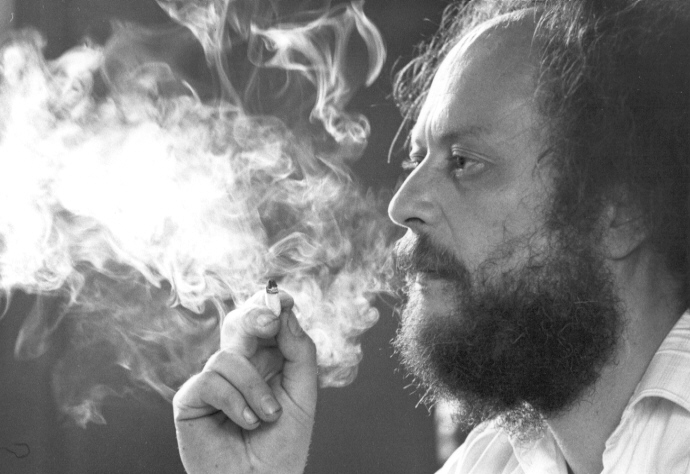
Niklaus Meienberg

Niklaus Meienberg (11 May 1940 – 22 September 1993) was a Swiss writer and investigative journalist.

Meienberg lived in Zürich and published 14 books in his lifetime. His works were primarily about recent Swiss history. His texts are used as exemplars in Swiss journalism schools.

Meienberg's best works were compiled in the book St. Fiden Paris Oerlikon. This book was republished in 2005/06 as part of the series Schweizer Bibliothek (a series of 20 of the most important Swiss books).

== Life ==
Meienberg was born 1940 in St. Gallen. He is the younger brother of missionary Peter Hildebrand Meienberg. After five years in the convent school in Disentis, the 20-year-old went to the U.S. for one year. In New York City he worked as a clerk for the Federation of Migros Cooperatives and in Vancouver, Canada, as a bulldozer driver.

On his return to Switzerland, he was ready to study. As a main subject, he chose history (at the University of Fribourg, then at the ETH Zurich and later thanks to a stipend, in Paris). During his years of study he reportedly was a member of a reactionary secret society. In Paris he experienced the riots of May 1968.

He finished his studies in Fribourg with the title of a „lic. phil.“ and the licentiate work De Gaulle und die USA von 1940 bis 42 (De Gaulle and the USA from 1940 to 42).

From 1966 on, he was a Paris correspondent for the Weltwoche, for five years. Starting in 1971, he reported for the Swiss national television’s culture show Perspektiven (“Perspectives”) and many productions for the Swiss national radio’s transmissions, such as the satirical transmission Faktenordner („Facts Folder“). Meanwhile, he became a freelancer for the Zurich newspaper Tages-Anzeiger and the Tages-Anzeiger's magazine Magazin (today named Das Magazin.)

After 1976, he was banned from writing for the Tages-Anzeiger because of his criticisms of both Swiss history and contemporary Switzerland. The longtime ban was imposed by publisher Otto Coning against the editorial staff's wishes.

In 1977 had to go to court because of scenes of his movie Die Erschiessung des Landesverräters Ernst S. (English meaning: “The execution of the national betrayer Ernst S.”) and because of a planned theatre play about Ulrich Wille. Meienberg, who was represented by leftist Moritz Leuenberger, a later member of the Bundesrat (Swiss Federal Council), won the process against the two sons of Wille.

From 1982 to 83, Niklaus Meienberg was head of the Paris Bureau of the German magazine Stern. Afterwards, he was a freelancer for the weekly newspaper WOZ and acted as a writer.

In spring 1987, he wrote a critical and heavy discussed biography of Ulrich Wille and his family for the Weltwoche. During fall of the same year, it was published as a book with the title Die Welt als Wille und Wahn (literally: “The World as Will and Delusion”). The German title is a play on words: “Wille” is not only a German word for "will"/"intention", but means the surname of Ulrich Wille, too. The title in turn seems to be a reference to German philosopher Arthur Schopenhauer’s (1788–1860) main work “Die Welt als Wille und Vorstellung” (“The World as Will and Representation”, sometimes also known in English as “The World as Will and Idea”)

Meienberg's penmanship found a lot few other sophisticated word-plays, too: In "Die Erschiessung des Landesverräters Ernst S." he calls the traitor's execution "Tells Geschoss" ("Tell's projectile"), because the executor shot through the betrayer's eye, like Tell shot through an apple, and the macabre punchline is as follows: in German, the "eyeball" is literally called "eye apple". Even Meienberg's book's titles attest a liking for word jokes (e.g. "The make-believing of true facts" that inverts "Die Vorspiegelung falscher Tatsachen", which is a set phrase in the world of German-speaking courts and jurisdiction.)

The above-mentioned report is partially based on photographs of unpublished letters that Wille wrote to his wife. The exclusive photographs were taken by Meienberg without permission - they were exposed as pieces of scenery in an exhibition. In the Afterword, Meienberg, admitted this fact as follows:

The guard commanding supervisor of the local museum Meilen never had flipped open the book, but was happy that its content pleased me and photographer Roland Gretler that much, and didn’t mind me excerpting any passages of the text or Roland Gretler integrally photographing a few dozens of pages.

Meienberg committed suicide on 22 September 1993.

In the media, the suicide of Meienberg caused a big echo. The Austrian writer Erich Hackl thinks, Meienberg killed himself, because he was no longer able to cope with the direction of the world. A doctor would trace this back to untreated depression. In his last letters Meienberg called himself an “expiring model” (of a journalist?), original text: “auslaufendes Modell”.

Niklaus Meienberg's literary remains are conserved in the Swiss Literary Archives in Bern, that amongst others also conserves the literary remains of famous names like Albert Einstein, Hermann Hesse, Patricia Highsmith and Adolf Muschg.

In 1998, Meienberg's former lover, Aline Graf, published a book with the title Der andere Niklaus Meienberg (The other Niklaus Meienberg), in which she describes the eight years she was his lover. She writes rather negatively about him, says that he had held her too tight and his body had looked like a cockchafer grub. Graf was invited to talk shows, gave interviews, had a big media presence. Her book received rather bad reviews in Switzerland's papers and magazines, only in Germany were some positive voices. Her style was found dirty and polluting, she was supposed to being keen on media presence.

The Swiss, that defended Meienberg, were disgusted and angry. Graf wanted to leave the country to recover in the Netherlands for a while.

=== Famous voices on Niklaus Meienberg ===
- "For me, Meienberg mainly is an important author of prose. It doesn’t matter, where this prose finally was published. That’s similar to Heine. Heinrich Heine wrote a big part of his work for newspapers. That now is part of the binding German-speaking prose." Peter von Matt
- "It is just right, what he wrote" Max Frisch

== Awards ==
- 1990 culture prize of the city St.Gallen
- 1989 Zürich journalists price
- 1988 workprice of the Max-Frisch-foundation

== Films ==
- 1976 »Die Erschiessung des Landesverräters Ernst S.« Drehbuch-Autor (with Richard Dindo) (English meaning: “The execution of the national betrayer Ernst S.”)
- 1980 »Es ist kalt in Brandenburg (Hitler töten«) (with Villi Hermann and Hans Sturm) 150 minutes. CH / BRD 1978/80. (English meaning: “It’s cold in Brandenburg (killing Hitler)”)
- Films for Swiss Television, together with Villi Hermann:
  - 1974 Ein Fremdarbeiter namens Liebermann (English meaning: „A foreign worker called Liebermann“)
  - 1974 Bundesarchiv – Putzfrauen und Politiker (English meaning: „Charladies and politicians“)

== Books ==
- St. Fiden - Paris - Oerlikon. Zürich 2006 ISBN 3-905753-08-1
- Reportagen 1 & 2. Zürich 2000 ISBN 3-85791-344-4 and 3-85791-345-2 (English meaning: „Reports: Vol. 1 and Vol. 2“)
- Zunder. Überfälle, Übergriffe, Überbleibsel. Zürich 1993 ISBN 3-257-22775-2 (English meaning: „Tinder. Attacks, inroads, remains“)
- Geschichte des Liebens und des Liebäugelns. Zürich 1992 ISBN 3-85791-210-3 (English meaning: „Story of Loving and Flirting”)
- Weh unser guter Kaspar ist tot. Plädoyers u. dgl.. Zürich 1991 ISBN 3-85791-185-9 (English meaning: „Sore, our good Kaspar is dead“)
- Golf-Krieg. Engagement, Verfolgung und Bedrohung. 1990 (English meaning: „Gulf War. Engagement, Prosecution and Harassment”)
- Vielleicht sind wir morgen schon bleich u. tot. Zürich 1989 ISBN 3-85791-149-2 (out of print) (English meaning: „Maybe tomorrow we are already pale and dead“)
- Die Welt als Wille & Wahn. Elemente zur Naturgeschichte eines Clans. Zürich 1987 ISBN 3-85791-128-X (English meaning: “The World as Will and Delusion. Elements about the natural history of a clan”)
- Heimsuchungen. Ein ausschweifendes Lesebuch. Zürich 1986 ISBN 3-257-21355-7 (English meaning: „Visitations: An outraging Storybook“)
- Der wissenschaftliche Spazierstock. Zürich 1985 ISBN 3-85791-095-X (English meaning: „The Scientific Cane“)
- Vorspiegelung wahrer Tatsachen. Zürich 1983 ISBN 3-85791-060-7 (English meaning: „The Make-believe of true Facts”)
- Die Erweiterung der Pupillen beim Eintritt ins Hochgebirge. Poesie 1966-1981. Zürich 1981 ISBN 3-85791-028-3 (English meaning: „The Enlargement of Pupillas when entering High Mountains”)
- Es ist kalt in Brandenburg. Ein Hitler-Attentat. Zürich 1980, Berlin 1990 (out of print) (English meaning: “It’s cold in Brandenburg. An attempt on Hitler”)
- Die Erschiessung des Landesverräters Ernst S. Darmstadt 1977, Zürich 1992, ISBN 3-85791-201-4 (English meaning: “The execution of the national betrayer Ernst S.”
- Das Schmettern des gallischen Hahns. Darmstadt 1976, Zürich 1987, ISBN 3-85791-123-9 (English meaning: “The smashing of the Gallic Rooster”)
- Reportagen aus der Schweiz. Darmstadt 1974, Zürich 1994 ISBN 3-85791-227-8 (English meaning: “Reports from Switzerland”)
