= Pirmin Meier =

Swiss author and teacher (born 1947)

- Born: February 21, 1947 (age 79); Würenlingen, Aargau, Switzerland
- Occupations: Writer, teacher
- Writing career
- Language: German
- Genre: Nonfiction

Pirmin Adrian Meier (born February 21, 1947) is a Swiss author and teacher (also in the field of adult education). To fellow writer Hansjörg Schneider, Meier is "der eigenständigste und eigenwilligste Schweizer Geschichtsschreiber seiner Generation" ("the most independent-minded and original Swiss writer of history in his generation").

== Life and career ==
Pirmin Meier was born into a butcher's family and grew up in Würenlingen. From 1963 to 1967, he attended the Benediktiner-Kollegium (a gymnasium) in Sarnen and then went on to study German language and literature, philosophy and history at the University of Zürich, where he received his PhD for a work on Reinhold Schneider in 1975. Subsequently, he worked as a school teacher and a journalist and served as joint editor in the publishing of the works of Reinhold Schneider by Suhrkamp and Insel (today a subsidiary of Suhrkamp). He also is a member of the Reinhold Schneider-Gesellschaft e.V.

Since 1979 he's been dividing this time primarily between teaching Philosophy, German and other subjects at a gymnasium in Beromünster and researching and writing his books which focus on portraying historical figures, places, and traditions in broad scope and detail.

Unusual for him, in 1984, Meier published Gsottniger Werwolf (which translates as "boiled werewolf"), a collection of poems, written in free-verse form and rife with literary allusions.

2004 saw the première of the miracle play Licht überm Tüchelweg (music by Stephan Meier) and in 2007, the Vitus-Oratorium aka Sankt Vitus in Merenschwand (music by Enrico Lavarini) was given its first performance; for both of these projects Meier provided the libretto.

He currently resides in Rickenbach.

== Literary style and themes ==
It's not easy to peg Meier's writings – often of strongly bio- or monographical content – to any particular discipline or literary genre. Most of his books are oscillating heavily between nonfiction and fiction, between historiographical scholarly paper and historical novel.

Although meticulously researched and diligently sourced, Meier doesn't limit himself to a rigid and terse presentation of facts but employs a literary language, engages in speculation where sources are sparse or nonexistent and also otherwise often applies novelistic techniques, for example by delving into the psyche of his characters. One might consider his approach as veering into the so-called nonfiction novel territory, but then it doesn't seem to fully square with how Truman Capote coined that term, either. So it is probably best described by Meier himself who gave his book about Heinrich Federer the subtitle "eine erzählerische Recherche" ("a narrational research").

All his historical protagonists are creative thinkers whose ideas, convictions, actions and conditions often made them outsiders or even social misfits facing considerable obstacles throughout their lives. So far, these include:

- Franz Desgouttes
- Heinrich Federer
- Heinrich Hössli
- Jacques-Barthélemy Micheli du Crest
- Paracelsus
- Reinhold Schneider
- Eduard Spörri
- Niklaus von Flüe
- Joseph Viktor von Scheffel

(for the exact titles, see Selected works below)

== Awards and honors ==
Year	Type of recognition
1993	The city of Überlingen's Bodensee-Literaturpreis for Paracelsus
2000	Annual award of the Stiftung für Abendländische Besinnung
2002	Aargauer Literaturpreis for his life's work
2008	Innerschweizer Kulturpreis

== Selected works ==
Year	Title	Publisher	ISBN
1972	Reinhold Schneider. Kurzer Führer durch Leben und Werk	Baden-Verlag, Baden	–
1978	Form und Dissonanz. Reinhold Schneider als historiographischer Schriftsteller	Lang, Bern	978-3-26-103-126-6
1984	Gsottniger Werwolf. Literaten-Gedichte zur Erbauung sowie zur Unterbrechung der Erbauung	SAZ, Zürich	978-3-90-798-700-1
1986	Joseph Victor von Scheffel und das Seetal. Zum 100. Todestag des Dichters. In memoriam Dr. Samuel Siegrist	–, Seengen	–
1989	Fundamentalismus, eine neue Bedrohung?	IPZ, Zürich	–
1991	Memorial Muri 1841. Zur aargauischen Klosteraufhebung von 1841	Kulturstiftung St. Martin, Muri	978-3-85-545-051-0
1993	Paracelsus. Arzt und Prophet. Annäherungen an Theophrastus von Hohenheim	Ammann, Zürich	978-3-25-010-152-9
1993	Schweiz. Geheimnisvolle Landschaft im Schatten der Alpen	Goldmann (Magisch Reisen), München	978-3-44-212-298-1
1997	Ich Bruder Klaus von Flüe. Eine Geschichte aus der inneren Schweiz. Ein biographischer Diskurs	Ammann, Zürich	978-3-25-010-309-7
1999	Die Einsamkeit des Staatsgefangenen Micheli du Crest. Eine Geschichte von Freiheit, Physik und Demokratie	Pendo, Zürich	978-3-85-842-357-3
2001	Eduard Spörri. Ein Alter Meister aus dem Aargau	AT, Aarau	978-3-85-502-728-6
2001	Mord, Philosophie und die Liebe der Männer. Franz Desgouttes und Heinrich Hössli. Eine Parallelbiographie	Pendo, Zürich	978-3-85-842-417-4
2002	Der Fall Federer. Priester und Schriftsteller in der Stunde der Versuchung. Eine erzählerische Recherche	Ammann, Zürich	978-3-25-010-442-1
2005	Landschaft der Pilger. Geheimnisvolle Orte im Herzen der Schweiz	Comenius, Luzern	978-3-90-628-624-2
2007	Politik, Prinzipien und das Gericht der Geschichte. Eine mit angemessener Schärfe formulierte zeitkritische Analyse	Schweizerzeit, Flaach	–
2007	Licht und Schatten über den Wassern (in Vierwaldstättersee. Lebensraum für Pflanzen, Tiere und Menschen, ed. Pius Stadelmann, pp. 296–309)	Brunner Verlag, Kriens	978-3-03-727-010-3
2009	Lerne das Leben und lebe das Lernen. Ausblick auf Erwin Jaeckle (1909–1997) zum 100. Geburtstag	Stiftung für Abendländische Ethik und Kultur, Zürich	978-3-03-302-135-8
2009	Angstfreier Blick über Wasser und Steine. Ein Fischzug ins Reich der Namen, Mütter, Heiler und Tellen (in Heimliches und Unheimliches vom Zugersee, ed. Thomas Hürlimann, pp. 47–79)	Hürlimann, Walchwil	978-3-03-302-210-2
