= Bodensee-Literaturpreis =

German literary award

Bodensee-Literaturpreis (Lake Constance Literature Prize) is a literary prize awarded in Baden-Württemberg, Germany. The city of Überlingen has been awarding the Lake Constance Literature Prize since 1954. The foundation of this municipal literature prize goes back to an initiative of the Baltic writer Eugen Assmann (1902–1979). The prize is to be awarded to an author for a special literary achievement within the literature of the entire Lake Constance area. The prize is endowed with 5,000 euros.

== Winners ==
- 1954 Wolfram von den Steinen for Notker der Dichter und seine geistige Welt
- 1955 Friedrich Georg Jünger for "sein lyrisches Werk"
- 1956 Leopold Ziegler for "sein philosophisches Werk"
- 1957 Richard Beitl for "sein volkskundliches und erzählerisches Werk"
- 1958 Mary Lavater-Sloman forEinsamkeit
- 1959 Wilhelm Boeck forJoseph Anton Feuchtmayer
- 1960 Johannes Duft for Bibliotheca Sangallensis
- 1961 Albert Knoepfli for "sein kunsthistorisches Schaffen"
- 1962 Felix Freiherr von Hornstein for Wald und Mensch
- 1963 not awarded
- 1964 Jacob Picard for Die alte Lehre
- 1965 Otto Feger for Geschichte des Bodenseeraumes
- 1966 Albert Bächtold for "sein erzählerisches Werk"
- 1967 Martin Walser for "sein Gesamtwerk"
- 1968 Georg Siemens for "seine erzählenden und wissenschaftlichen Arbeiten"
- 1969 Gebhard Spahr for Weingartner Liederhandschrift
- 1970 not awarded
- 1971 Claus Zoege for Die Bildhauerfamilie Zürn
- 1972 Werner Koch for Seeleben
- 1973 not awarded
- 1974 Ernst Benz for Geist und Landschaft
- 1975 Horst Stern for "seine publizistische Tätigkeit, besonders im Hinblick auf die Ökologie des Bodenseeraumes"
- 1976 und 1977 exposed
- 1978 Manfred Bosch for "seine Gedichte in Radolfzeller Mundart und seine Essays"
- 1979 Arno Borst for Mönche am Bodensee 610–1525
- 1980 Otto Frei for "sein erzählerisches Werk"
- 1981 Hermann Kinder for "seine epische Prosa" und Peter Renz for Vorläufige Beruhigung
- 1983 Ingrid Puganigg for Fasnacht
- 1985 Werner Dürrson for Das Kattenhorner Schweigen
- 1987 Golo Mann for "seine dem Bodensee geltenden essayistischen und autobiographischen Schriften"
- 1989 Hans Boesch for Der Sog
- 1991 Bruno Epple for "sein literarisches Schaffen"
- 1993 Pirmin Meier for Paracelsus – Arzt und Prophet
- 1995 not awarded
- 1997 Manfred Bosch for Bohème am Bodensee
- 1999 Beat Brechbühl for Fussreise mit Adolf Dietrich and for "seine Beiträge zu Auf dem Rücken des Sees"
- 2001 Werner Mezger for Das große Buch der schwäbisch-alemannischen Fasnet
- 2004 Zsuzsanna Gahse for durch und durch. Müllheim/Thur in drei Kapiteln
- 2006 Markus Werner for Am Hang
- 2008 Michael Köhlmeier for Abendland
- 2010 Christian Uetz for previous literary oeuvre
- 2012 Peter Stamm for previous literary
- 2014 Arnold Stadler for previous literary oeuvre
- 2016 Peter Salomon for previous literary oeuvre
- 2018 Eva Gesine Baur for previous literary oeuvre
- 2020 Monika Helfer for literary oeuvre
- 2022 Verena Rossbacher for her literary oeuvre
