= Albert Knoepfli =

Swiss art historian (1909–2002)

Albert Knoepfli (9 December 1909, in Bischofszell – 14 December 2002, in Aadorf) was a Swiss art historian and conservator. A graduate of the University of Basel, the University of Grenoble, and the University of Perugia, he lectured at ETH Zurich. He was a recipient of the Bodensee-Literaturpreis.
