= Faraja Foundation =

Faraja Foundation is a Kenyan-based nonprofit humanitarian organisation founded by Peter Hildebrand Meienberg. Previously a social intervention and implementation department of Faraja Trust, Faraja Foundation was formally established in 2011.

The organization's goals are to "rehabilitate and reintegrate offenders and children in conflict with the law in a rights-based approach." This mission is guided by a focus on three branches: capacity development, advocacy, and community adaptation. Additionally, Faraja foundation has done work in agricultural training for young apprentices, launched initiatives to build rainwater tanks for small scale farmers.

== History ==
Faraja Foundation was established in 1999 by Fr. Peter Meienberg. Its name, Faraja, is Swahili for 'consolation' or 'encouragement.' Initially, Faraja trust was established to finance many projects in the fields of humanitarian aid and education, engaging predominantly with displaced refugees and those living in slums. Later, responding to Meienberg's new focus on prison reform in Kenya, Faraja Foundation's work on prison reform gained prominence.

Faraja Trust was initially fully financed by Meienberg's networks in Switzerland, forming the Swiss Donors' Association of Faraja Trust. Later, Meienberg purchased land in the Westlands to construct 24 luxury apartments to rent to expatriates, who worked for embassies, the UN, or NGOs. Presently, Faraja Foundation is also financed by donor fundraisers.

== Current Work ==
Faraja Foundation focuses on supporting the rehabilitation of incarcerated individuals. Currently involved in 50 prisons or correctional institutions, the Foundation aims to improve existing institutions that tackle rehabilitation, by streamlining congestion, improving documentation process, and implementing more concrete rehabilitation programmes. Additionally, the foundation is also concerned with psychosocial and counselling support for offenders in prison.

Faraja Foundation also implements a variety of rehabilitation programs to reintegrate offenders into society. These measures include transportation stipends, skills training, and scholarships for offenders pursuing vocational training or secondary education.

Faraja Foundation is also invested in human rights and advocacy. Seeking to empower incarcerated individuals, Faraja Foundation coordinates with activists at the local and national level, organisation offer training sessions, training paralegals to reach unreached prisons, and campaigning for increased legislative protections in government, such as gaps in CAP 90,92,64,141.
