= Hermann Kinder =

German writer (1944–2021)

- Born: 18 May or 18 June 1944; Toruń, German-occupied Poland
- Died: 27 August 2021 (aged 77); Konstanz, Germany
- Occupations: Writer; Professor

Hermann Kinder (18 May or 18 June 1944 – 27 August 2021) was a German writer.

== Biography ==
Kinder was born on 18 May or 18 June 1944 in Toruń and spent his childhood in Ulm, Nuremberg, and Münster. He earned a degree in art history from the University of Münster and later earned a master's degree. In 1972, he became an assistant professor from the University of Konstanz. He also taught at the University of Klagenfurt and Shanghai University.

In 1977, Kinder was awarded the Hungertuch-Preis and the Bodensee-Literaturpreis in 1981. In 1996, he was given the Alemannischer Literaturpreis and the Literaturpreis der Stadt Stuttgart in 1998.

Hermann Kinder died in Konstanz on 27 August 2021, at the age of 77.

== Works ==
- Das Verhältnis von Dichtung und Geschichte in Wilhelm Raabes „Odfeld“ und „Hastenbeck“ (1968)
- Poesie als Synthese (1973)
- Der Schleiftrog (1977)
- Du mußt nur die Laufrichtung ändern (1978)
- Lauter lieben (1980)
- Vom Schweinemut der Zeit (1980)
- Der helle Wahn (1981)
- Bürgers Liebe (1981)
- Liebe und Tod (1983)
- Der Mensch, ich Arsch (1983)
- Die klassische Sau (1986)
- Ins Auge (1987)
- Winter am Meer (1987)
- Fremd – daheim (1988)
- Kina, Kina (1988)
- Die böhmischen Schwestern (1990)
- Der Mythos von der Gruppe 47 (1991)
- Alma (1994)
- Von gleicher Hand (1995)
- Um Leben und Tod (1997)
- Nachts mit Filzstift und Tinte (1998)
- Himmelhohes Krähengeschrei (2000)
- Die Forellsche Erkrankung (2002)
- Mein Melaten. Der Methusalem-Roman (2006)
- Berthold Auerbach - "Einst fast eine Weltberühmtheit" (2011)
