= Ruth Schweikert =

Swiss writer (1964–2023)

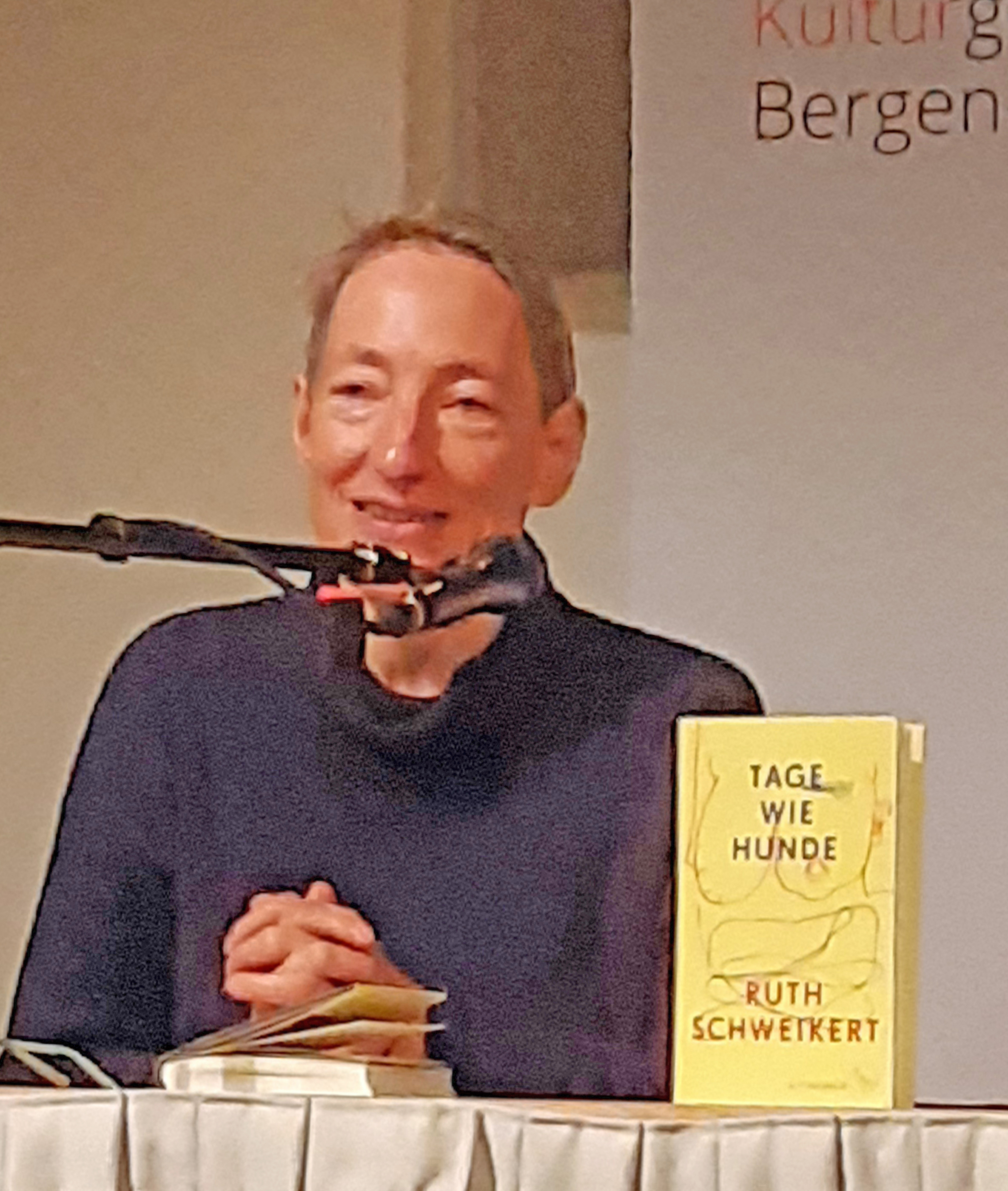
Schweikert in 2020

Ruth Schweikert (15 July 1964 – 4 June 2023) was a Swiss writer. She is best known for her novels Augen zu (Eyes Shut) (1998), Ohio (2005) and How we get older (2015). Schweikert was awarded a number of prizes, including the Swiss Schiller Foundation Prize in 1999, the Art Prize of the City of Zurich in 2016 and the Solothurn Literature Prize, also in 2016.

== Life ==
Schweikert was born on 15 July 1964 in Lörrach, southern Germany. She published her debut, Erdnüsse. Totschlagen, a collection of short stories, in 1994. The book garnered immediate attention, and Schweikert "caused a sensation as a powerful voice for a new, young generation in Swiss literature", inviting comparison with writers Peter Weber and Urs Richle. She is best known for her novels Augen zu (Eyes Shut) (1998), Ohio (2005) and How we get older (2015). She was president of the Suisseculture association for four years, and mentored young writers at the Literatur Institute (Bern Academy of the Arts) in Biel or at the Young Literature Lab in Zurich.

Schweikert was awarded a number of prizes, including the Swiss Schiller Foundation Prize in 1999, the Art Prize of the City of Zurich in 2016 and the Solothurn Literature Prize, also in 2016. Her stories have been described as "elementary, anarchic, with an irrepressible zest for life and an impetuous narrative power". She has been credited with creating "a great encyclopedia of the unhappy family – which is also an equally great declaration of love for the family".

Schweikert was diagnosed with aggressive breast cancer in 2016, which she used as a springboard for her last novel, Days Like Dogs, published in 2019. She died on 4 June 2023 at the age of 58, from cancer. Schweikert was married to filmmaker Eric Bergkraut. She was survived by her husband and her five sons.

== Publications ==
=== Prose ===
- Erdnüsse. Totschlagen. Rotpunktverlag, Zürich 1994, ISBN 3-85869-095-3.
  - Taschenbuchausgabe: dtv, München 1999, ISBN 3-423-12691-4.
  - Schweizer Bibliothek: Band 5, Zürich 2005, ISBN 3-905753-05-7.
- Paris. Reflexionen. Ein Buchprojekt von Peter Schweizer (Photographien) und Ruth Schweikert (Text). Edition Schweizer, Pratteln 1996, ISBN 3-9520695-1-5.
- Augen zu. Roman. Ammann, Zürich 1998, ISBN 3-250-60024-5.
  - Taschenbuchausgabe: Fischer, Frankfurt am Main 2000, ISBN 3-596-14656-9.
- Ohio. Roman. Ammann, Zürich 2005, ISBN 3-250-60051-2.
- Hin und Her. Ein Dialog zwischen Peter Radelfinger und Ruth Schweikert. Verlag für moderne Kunst, Nürnberg 2006, ISBN 3-938821-99-X.
- Wie wir älter werden. Roman. S. Fischer, Frankfurt am Main 2015, ISBN 978-3-10-002263-9.
- Tage wie Hunde. S. Fischer, Frankfurt am Main 2019, ISBN 978-3-10-397386-0.
- Fallen Sie Nicht. Fliegen Sie lieber. Stories and essays. Edited by Eric Bergkraut, Raphael Schweikert, and Martin Zingg, with contributions by Katharina Hacker, Noëmi Lerch, and Adolf Muschg, Limmat Verlag, Zürich, 2025, ISBN 978-3-03926-089-8

=== Stage play ===
- Welcome home. Premiere at Theater am Neumarkt, Zürich, 1998.
- Mary & Mary. Premiere at Theater Chur, Chur, 2009.

=== Screenplay ===
- (zusammen mit Eric Bergkraut): Wir Eltern. Spielfilm. Schweiz 2019.

=== Contributions to anthologies ===
- Ein Beitrag in: Take care. Swiss Institute, New York 1995
- Michele, geb. 1926; Almut geb. 1933. In: Grenzen sprengen. Texte von Schweizer Autorinnen und Autoren. Hg. v. Annemarie Bänziger. Wolfbach, Zürich 1997, S. 9–15.
- Ein Beitrag in: Domino. Ein Schweizer Literatur-Reigen. Hg. v. Simone Meier. Otto Müller, Salzburg 1998
- Fabrizio, geb. 1926; Almut geb. 1933. In: Die Schweiz erzählt. Junge Erzähler. Ausgewählt und mit einem Vorwort herausgegeben von Plinio Bachmann. Fischer Taschenbuch, Frankfurt am Main 1998, S. 175–180.
- Ein Beitrag in: Das Beste kommt noch. Theater Neumarkt Zürich 1993–1999. Eine Hinterlassenschaft. Kontrast, Zürich 1999, ISBN 3-9521287-4-0
- E la nave va. In: Swiss Made. Junge Literatur aus der deutschsprachigen Schweiz. Hg. v. Reto Sorg und Andreas Paschedag. Wagenbach, Berlin 2001, S. 100–105.
- Alejandros Katze. In: Natürlich die Schweizer! Neues von Paul Nizon, Ruth Schweikert, Peter Stamm u. a. Hg. v. Reto Sorg und Yeboaa Ofosu. Aufbau Taschenbuch, Berlin 2002, S. 73–79.
- Ein Beitrag in: Valser Texte. Anthologie der Hausautoren. Edition Therme, Vals 2005, ISBN 3-938767-09-X.
- Bei den Pappeln. In: Nachbilder. Eine Foto Text Anthologie. Hrsg. von der Plattform Kulturpublizistik der Zürcher Hochschule der Künste und dem Fotomuseum Winterthur. Spector Books, Leipzig 2021.

== Awards and honors ==
- 1994: Ingeborg-Bachmann-Preis: Bertelsmann-Stipendium für die Erzählung 50 Franken
- 1996: Stipendium des Suhrkamp Verlages Zürich
- 1998: Ehrengaben der Stadt und des Kantons Zürich für Augen zu
- 1999: Preis der Schweizerischen Schillerstiftung
- 2015: Stadtschreiber von Bergen-Enkheim
- 2016: Schweizer Literaturpreis
- 2016: Solothurner Literaturpreis
- 2016: Zürcher Kunstpreis
- 2019: Anerkennungsbeitrag des Kantons Zürich
- 2020: Schillerpreis der Zürcher Kantonalbank für Tage wie Hunde
