= Müsli =

Müsli may refer to:

- an alternative spelling of Muesli, a breakfast dish based on raw rolled oats and other ingredients
- a diminutive term for a mouse in Swiss German
- Müsli, Glarus, a hamlet near the village of Elm in the Swiss canton of Glarus
