= Zündels Abgang =

1984 novel by Markus Werner

Zündel’s Departure
- First edition
- Author: Markus Werner
- Original title: Zündels Abgang
- Genre: Novel
- Publisher: Residenz Verlag
- Publication date: 1984
- Publication place: Switzerland

Zündels Abgang (Zündel’s Departure) is the first novel of Swiss writer Markus Werner (1944 in Eschlikon). It was published in 1984 and became a bestseller and enjoys the status of cult novel for a lot of readers.

== Plot summary ==
From diary-style notes and personal memories and conversations, the fictive narrator Reverend Busch reconstructs and documents the stepwise fall of his missing friend, the teacher Konrad Zündel. During many summer weeks, the life of the depressive, intellectual, quixotic protagonist is destroyed step by step. In the reader's eyes, Zündel simply suffers one mishap after another, but for the unstable teacher – that says, he never was happy in his life – these mishaps lead into mania and into the planning and execution of his departure.

Konrad Zündel and his wife Magda, whose relationship after five years breaks down because of everyday things, decide to spend their holidays separately. While Magda spends some days with her friend Helen, Konrad decides to visit Greece. But in Italy, he suddenly loses an incisor and travels back to Switzerland per train. While travelling, his wallet is stolen and he finds a severed finger on the train closet. The finger's origins and meaning never are explained. In his Swiss flat, the caretaker denotes that Magda did something with another man. Later, this statement turns out to be a lie, but the thought of losing his wife throws Zündel out of his way. He travels to Genoa, where he was sired by a Swiss sick-nurse and an irresponsible globetrotter. In Genoa, he is drunken nearly all the time and tries to write down his philosophical – often cynic – gnosis.

It is about – like the whole novel – the relation between Konrad and Magda, between man and woman, between womanhood and manhood. The guilty for his departure, due to Magda, who represent the totality of all women, who destroy men with their will to self-actualization.

Zündel has two important meetings in Genoa: In a bar, he meets Serafin, a Spanish sailor with an Austrian accent. The two men are constating a relation between their souls – and leave each other. Not less surreal is the meeting with the French woman Nounou; Zündel spends a night with her, again discovering relation of souls. He leaves her in dawn, before the situation would necessitate hundred knives to separate us.

After these two meetings, Zündel wants to fulfil the main goal of his voyage: Getting an illegal handgun. This plan shipwrecks, too. Because of his naïveté and gentleman's style, Zündel is frauded. Afterwards, he travels home. Extremely confused, undernourished and now heavily addicted to alcohol, he enters the flat, where the distressed Magda has expected his return for days. A normal conversation, that would clear these misunderstandings (e.g. the not existing lover), isn't possible, because Zündel now is mentally ill.

The next morning, the teacher Zündel only gives another two lessons, which turn out to be very strange. Then he breaks down in school, is brought to the hospital and then to mental clinic. The psychiatrists fail in making a diagnosis. Zündel escapes from the clinic to his weekend house in the mountains, where he hides armed and dangerous. The narrator, Busch, is the last person who is able to get close to him, before he departs finally.
