= Hugo Loetscher =

Swiss writer and essayist

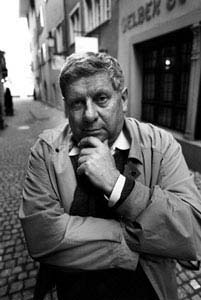
- Hugo Loetscher by Erling Mandelmann
- Born: 22 December 1929; Zürich, Switzerland
- Died: 18 August 2009 (aged 79); Zürich, Switzerland
- Occupations: Novelist, essayist
- Writing career
- Language: German
- Period: 1963–2009
- Notable awards: Conrad-Ferdinand-Meyer-Preis (1966)

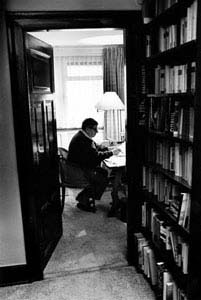

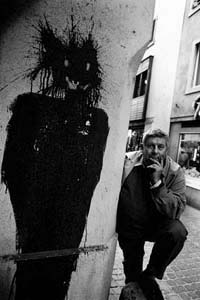

Hugo Loetscher (22 December 1929 – 18 August 2009) was a Swiss writer and essayist.

== Life ==
Loetscher was born and raised in Zurich. He studied philosophy, sociology, and literature at the University of Zurich and the Sorbonne. At Zurich in 1956 he obtained a doctorate with a work called Die politische Philosophie in Frankreich nach 1945 ("Political Philosophy in France after 1945").

Afterwards, he was literature reviewer for the newspaper Neue Zürcher Zeitung and the magazine Weltwoche. From 1958 to 1962, he was a member of the editorial department of the monthly cultural magazine Du and founded the literary supplement Das Wort. From 1964 until 1969 he was feuilleton editor and member of the editorial board of the Weltwoche. He next became a freelance writer.

In the 1960s, Loetscher worked as a reporter in Latin America with his primary focuses being Cuba and Brazil. Later, he also traveled through Southeast Asia. He was writer in residence in 1979/80 at the University of Southern California in Los Angeles where he wrote Herbst in der Grossen Orange. In 1981/82, he was the first holder of the Swiss Chair at the City University of New York. He was guest lecturer at several universities, e.g., in 1988 at LMU Munich, in 1999 at the University of Porto, and in 2008 at the Shanghai International Studies University and the University of California, Berkeley. Loetscher died aged 79 in Zurich.

== Performances ==
Hugo Loetscher's works were often based on his traveling experiences; he has been called "the most cosmopolitan Swiss writer". His experiences are reflected in reports including Zehn Jahre Fidel Castro (1969) and narrative works such as Wunderwelt a Brazilian Fairy Tale, and Eine brasilianische Begegnung (1979). Loetscher's most famous works are Der Immune (1975) and Die Papiere des Immunen (1986), in which he experimented with several literary genres. This variety of genres also reflects itself in other works: fables in Die Fliege und die Suppe (1989), short stories in Der Buckel (2002), columns in Der Waschküchenschlüssel und andere Helvetica (1983), poetry in Es war einmal die Welt (2004). In 2003, he published Lesen statt klettern, a collection of essays on Swiss literature, in which he questioned the traditional image of Switzerland as an Alpine nation. His literary estate is archived in the Swiss Literary Archives in Bern.

Loetscher also had strong interest in visual arts, particularly painting and photography. Besides, he made a documentary on politics in Portugal in 1965. He was a close friend of the Swiss painter Varlin (Willy Guggenheim). Varlin painted Loetscher and in 1969, Loetscher edited the first book about Varlin's life and work. As President of the Foundation of Swiss Photography, Loetscher was co-editor of the first history of Swiss photography Photographie in Der Schweiz Von 1840 Bis Heute (1974).

Loetscher was a member of the Swiss Writers´ Association (Schweizerischer Schriftstellerverband), serving as its president from 1986 to 1989. He was also a corresponding member of the Deutsche Akademie für Sprache und Dichtung in Darmstadt.

== The Dürrenmatt affair ==
Loetscher was a good friend of the Swiss playwright Friedrich Dürrenmatt. After Dürrenmatt's death, legal action was taken against Loetscher by Dürrenmatt's widow Charlotte Kerr, which was to be later dismissed. The lawsuit's reason: Loetscher wrote a report about Dürrenmatt's abdication in Lesen statt klettern, which Kerr claimed violated her "personal rights". She also criticized details like the folded hands of the laid out corpse or a Stephen King book on Dürrenmatt's bedside table. The description of the funeral had hurt her dignity. She stated that Loetscher was mistaken; Dürrenmatt had been atheist, he would not have folded his hands. Loetscher explained that there had been a drawing that showed Dürrenmatt with hands folded. Kerr supposedly had asked for it and burnt it. He emphasized that he had been a friend of Dürrenmatt for many years. The judges dismissed the case, exonerating Loetscher.

== Awards and honors ==
- 1964 Charles Veillon prize
- 1966 Conrad-Ferdinand-Meyer-Preis
- 1972 Literature prize of the city of Zurich
- 1985 Schiller prize of the canton bank of Zurich
- 1992 Big Schiller prize of the Swiss Schiller Foundation (de)
- 1994 Cruzeiro do Sul for his merits for Brazilian culture
- First prize in the poetry competition of the Festival Rilke in Sierre for Once Upon a Time the World, 2006
- Honorary citizen of the municipality of Escholzmatt (Canton of Lucerne), 2004
- Contribution from the Canton of Zurich in the field of literature, 2000
- Honorary gift from the city of Zurich in the field of literature, 1999
- Honorary gift from the Canton of Zurich in the field of literature, 1999
- Brasserie Lipp literary prize for The Fly and the Soup: Award for Hugo Loetscher and for the translation into French by Jean-Claude Capèle, 1996

== Works ==
- Abwässer, Zürich 1963
- Die Kranzflechterin, Zürich 1964
- Noah, Zürich 1967 (Noah: A Novel of the Boom Times, translated by Samuel P. Willcocks, Seagull Books 2012, ISBN 9780857420466)
- Zehn Jahre Fidel Castro, Zürich 1969
- Der Immune, Darmstadt u. a. 1975 (Le Déserteur engagé, translated into French by Monique Thiollet, Éditions Belfond, Paris, 1989; also 2006 in the Book series Schweizer Bibliothek)
- Die Entdeckung der Schweiz und anderes, Zürich 1976
- Kulinaritäten, Bern 1976 (corresponding with Alice Vollenweider)
- Wunderwelt, Darmstadt u. a. 1979
- Herbst in der Grossen Orange, Zürich 1982
- How many languages does man need?, New York 1982
- Der Waschküchenschlüssel und andere Helvetica, Zürich 1983
- Das Hugo-Loetscher-Lesebuch, Zürich 1984
- Die Papiere des Immunen, Zürich 1986
- Vom Erzählen erzählen, Zürich 1988
- Die Fliege und die Suppe und 33 andere Tiere in 33 anderen Situationen, Zürich 1989
- Der predigende Hahn, Zürich 1992
- Saison, Zürich 1995
- Die Augen des Mandarin, Zürich 1999
- Äs tischört und plutschins, Zürich 2000
- Durchs Bild zur Welt gekommen, Zürich 2001
- Der Buckel, Zürich 2002
- Lesen statt klettern, Zürich 2003
- Es war einmal die Welt, Zürich 2004
- War meine Zeit meine Zeit, Zürich 2009

=== Publications as a publisher ===
- Manuel Gasser: Welt vor Augen, Frankfurt am Main 1964
- António Vieira: Die Predigt des Heiligen Antonius an die Fische, Zürich 1966
- Varlin: Varlin, Zürich 1969
- Zürich – Aspekte eines Kantons, Zürich 1972
- Photographie in der Schweiz von 1840 bis heute, Teufen 1974; compl. Bern 1992
- Adrien Turel: Bilanz eines erfolglosen Lebens, Frauenfeld 1976
- Hans Falk: Circus zum Thema, Zürich 1981

=== Translations ===
- Le Corbusier: Von der Poesie des Bauens, Zürich 1957
- Ayi Kwei Armah: Die Schönen sind noch nicht geboren, Olten u. a. 1971
- Walter Sorell: Europas kleiner Riese, München 1972 (with Franz Z. Küttel)
- José Guadelupe Posada: Posada, Zürich 1979

== Literature ==
- Romey Sabalius: Die Romane Hugo Loetschers im Spannungsfeld von Fremde und Vertrautheit, New York u. a.: Lang 1995. (= Studies in modern German literature; 72) ISBN 0-8204-2670-9
- Jeroen Dewulf: Hugo Loetscher und die «portugiesischsprachige Welt», Bern u. a.: Lang 1999. (= Europäische Hochschulschriften; Reihe 1, Deutsche Sprache und Literatur; 1734) ISBN 3-906763-78-1
- Jeroen Dewulf: In alle Richtungen gehen. Reden und Aufsätze über Hugo Loetscher, Zürich: Diogenes 2005. ISBN 3-257-06466-7
- Jeroen Dewulf: Brasilien mit Brüchen. Schweizer unter dem Kreuz des Südens, Zürich: NZZ Verlag 2007. ISBN 978-3-03823-349-7
