= German Art Archive =

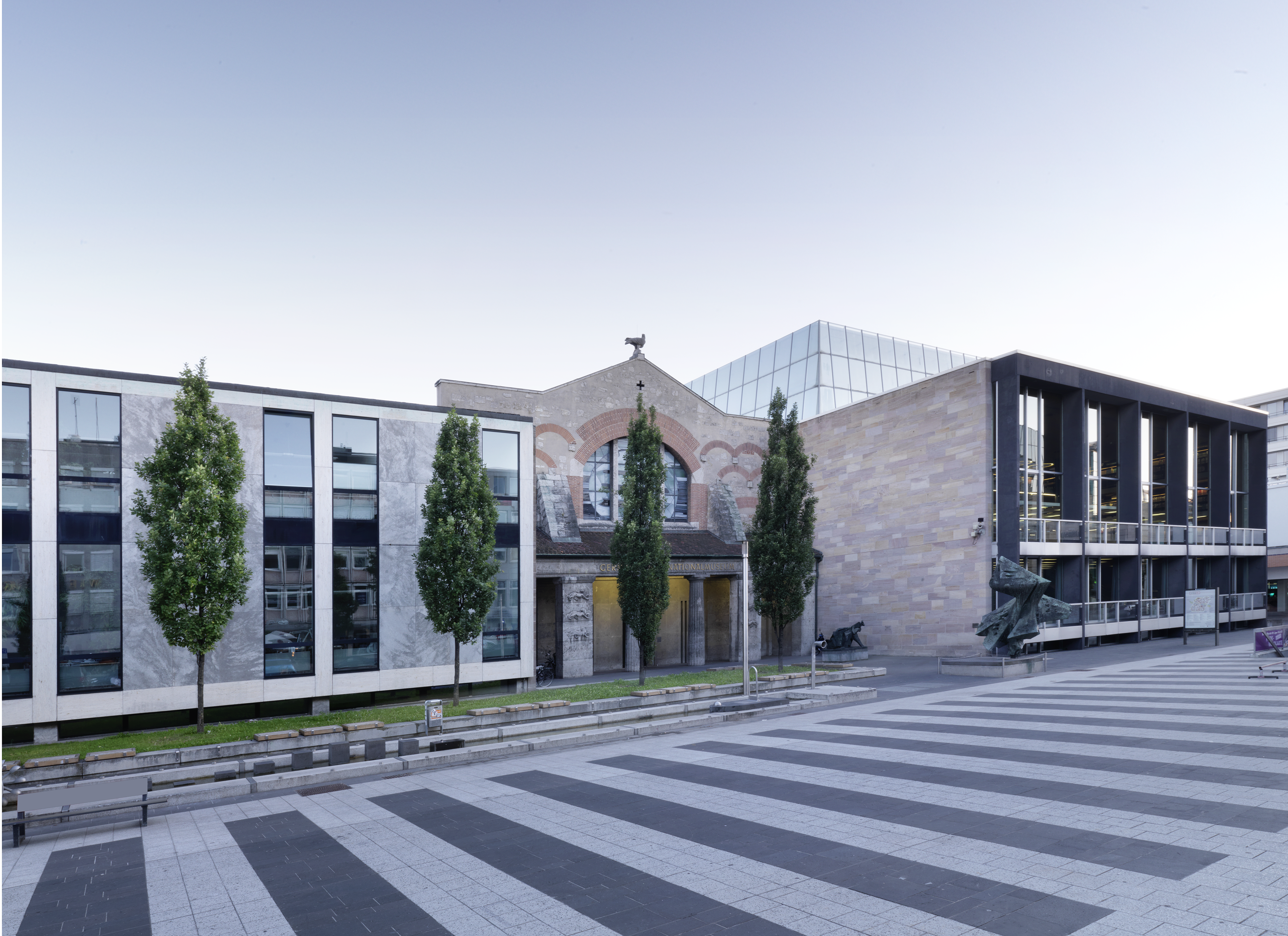
Entrance to the Archive at 1 Kornmarkt.

The German Art Archive (Deutsche Kunstarchiv or DKA) is the world's largest collection of 'Nachlasse' or literary estates on art and culture in the German-speaking lands from the late 19th century to the present day. It was established in 1964 as part of the German National Museum in Nuremberg and was renamed to its present name in 2008. It has been headed by archivists such as Ludwig Veit, Irmtraud von Andrian-Werburg, Birgit Jooss and Roland Prügel, Susanna Brogi (since 2018).

The estates were donated before death or bequeathed and the archive also houses associated documents. The archive has over 1,400 holdings and approximately 3.2 kilometres of shelving. It focusses on personal documents, correspondence and records but also houses sketchbooks, photographs and audiovisual material. It covers architecture, sculpture, painting, design, photography, art history, the art market, applied arts, visual studies and art restoration.

The DKA collects and preserves personal papers and legacies and produces and publishes scholarly catalogues. At the interface between art production, scholarship, and the art-loving public, it makes its holdings available to all interested parties in its study room, while respecting current copyright. It answers enquiries, provides papers and other items for exhibitions, and organises conferences, seminars and workshops. Through teaching, lectures, guided tours, exhibitions, editorial projects, catalogues raisonnés and biographies, the DKA keeps in close contact with other archives, museums, universities, researchers and art historians.

== Collections ==
It houses the literary estates of Lovis Corinth, Otto Dix, Johannes Grützke, Olaf Gulbransson, Hannah Höch, Käthe Kruse, Franz Marc, Gerhard Marcks, Gabriel von Max, Stefan Moses, Anna Muthesius, Ernst Wilhelm Nay, Richard Riemerschmid, Elisabeth Treskow, Werner Tübke, Ursula Schultze-Bluhm and Sarah Schumann.

== In-person exhibitions ==
=== Selected exhibitions ===
- 1976 Charles Crodel (Katalog: Materialien 1)
- 1977 Otto Dix (Katalog: Materialien 2)
- 1978 Cuno Fischer (Katalog: Materialien 3)
- 1978 Fritz Koelle (Katalog: Materialien 4a)
- 1978 Hans Reiffenstuel (Katalog: Materialien 4b)
- 1978 Bernhard Bleeker (Katalog: Materialien 5a)
- 1978 Curth Georg Becker (Katalog: Materialien 6)
- 1979 Gerhard Marcks. Briefe und Werke (Katalog: Materialien 7)
- 1980 Ernst Wilhelm Nay. Bilder und Dokumente (Katalog: Werke und Dokumente, NF. 1)
- 1980 Olaf Gulbransson (Katalog: Werke und Dokumente, NF. 2)
- 1981 Georg Meistermann (Katalog: Werke und Dokumente, NF. 3)
- 1981 Conrad Felixmüller (Katalog: Werke und Dokumente, NF. 4)
- 1982 Richard Riemerschmid. Vom Jugendstil zum Werkbund (Katalog: Werke und Dokumente, NF. 5)
- 1984 Gustav Seitz (Katalog: Werke und Dokumente, NF. 6)
- 1987 Otto Herbert Hajek (Katalog: Werke und Dokumente, NF. 7)
- 1988 Gerhard Marcks (Katalog: Werke und Dokumente, NF. 8)
- 1991 Max Kaus (Katalog: Werke und Dokumente, NF. 9)
- 1995 Carl-Heinz Kliemann (Katalog: Werke und Dokumente, NF. 10)
- 1996 Eberhard Fiebig. Plädoyer für eine intelligente Kunst (Katalog: Werke und Dokumente, NF. 11)
- 1998 Karl Hartung (Katalog: Werke und Dokumente, NF. 12)
- 2003 Heinz Trökes (Katalog: Werke und Dokumente, NF. 13)
- 2005 Georg Tappert. Deutscher Expressionist (Katalog: Werke und Dokumente, NF. 14)
- 2011 Johannes Grützke. Die Retrospektive (Katalog: Werke und Dokumente, NF. 15)

== Bibliography (in German) ==
- Roland Prügel: Das Deutsche Kunstarchiv im Germanischen Nationalmuseum. In: Anlass: Nachlass. Kompendium zum Umgang mit Künstlernachlässen. Hrsg. vom Bundesverband Bildender Künstlerinnen und Künstler. Oberhausen 2015, S. 54–56.
- Birgit Jooss: Basis aller Arbeit im Deutschen Kunstarchiv bleibt die Sicherung des Schriftguts und damit unseres Kulturerbes für die zukünftige kunstwissenschaftliche Forschung. In: anno RAK. Mitteilungen aus dem Rheinischen Archiv für Künstlernachlässe. Heft 1. Bonn 2009, S. 22 f.
- Birgit Jooss: Das Deutsche Kunstarchiv im Germanischen Nationalmuseum, Nürnberg. Vom Umgang mit schriftlichen Nachlässen von Künstlern und Kunstwissenschaftlern. In: AKMB news. Informationen zu Kunst, Museum und Bibliothek. Jg. 16, Heft 1, 2010, S. 16–21.
- Birgit Jooss: Das Deutsche Kunstarchiv im Germanischen Nationalmuseum, Nürnberg. In: kultur politik. Bundesverband Bildender Künstlerinnen und Künstler. Nr. 2. Juni 2010, S. 15 f.
- Birgit Jooss: Das Deutsche Kunstarchiv in Nürnberg als Forschungszentrum zur Kunst aus Mitteldeutschland. In: Kultur Report. Stiftung Mitteldeutscher Kulturrat. Heft 1, 2014, S. 11–13.
- Birgit Jooss: Wider das Vergessen. Die Gesichter des Deutschen Kunstarchivs. In: Rundbrief Fotografie. Analoge und digitale Bildmedien in Archiven und Sammlungen. Hrsg. von Hubert Locher und Christian Bracht, Vol. 21, No. 4, 2014, S. 33–42.
- Birgit Jooss: Vom Umgang mit unserem kulturellen Gedächtnis. Das Deutsche Kunstarchiv im Germanischen Nationalmuseum, Nürnberg. In: Ja, was is denn des?! Forschen im Museum (Bayerischer Museumstag 2013). Hrsg. von der Landesstelle für die nichtstaatlichen Museen beim Bayerischen Landesamt für Denkmalpflege, München 2014, S. 40–43.
- Birgit Jooss and Lars Blunck (ed.s): Die Gesichter der Kunst. Beiträge der Tagung im Germanischen Nationalmuseum, Nürnberg 2018
- Claus Pese: Das Archiv für Bildende Kunst im Germanischen Nationalmuseum. In: Kulturberichte. Hrsg. vom Arbeitskreis selbständiger Kulturinstitute (ASKI) e. V., H.2, Juli 1997, S. 36 f.
- Claus Pese: Mehr als nur Kunst. Das Archiv für Bildende Kunst im Germanischen Nationalmuseum. Hatje, Ostfildern-Ruit 1998, ISBN 3-7757-0783-2.
- Claus Pese: Archiv für Bildende Kunst. In: 1852/2002. Germanisches Nationalmuseum, Heidelberg 2001, S. 60 (= Vernissage, 9. Jg., H. 18).
- Claus Pese: Das Archiv für Bildende Kunst. In: Mäzene, Schenker, Stifter. Das Germanische Nationalmuseum und seine Sammlungen. Nürnberg 2002, S. 117–124.
- Horst Pohl: Ordnungsmethoden im Archiv für bildende Kunst. In: Der Archivar. Mitteilungsblatt für deutsches Archivwesen. Bd. 22, 1969, S. 385–395.
- Ludwig Veit: Das Historische Archiv und das Archiv für Bildende Kunst. In: Das Germanische Nationalmuseum Nürnberg 1852–1977. Hrsg. von Bernward Deneke und Rainer Kahsnitz. Deutscher Kunstverlag, München/Berlin 1978, ISBN 3-422-00684-2, S. 521–545.
- Martina Wehlte-Höschele: Die Spuren der Künstler. Das Archiv für Bildende Kunst im Germanischen Nationalmuseum in Nürnberg. In: Frankfurter Allgemeine Zeitung. 27. August 1987.

== External links (in German) ==
- Internetpräsenz des Deutschen Kunstarchivs
- Online-Katalog des Deutschen Kunstarchivs
- Datenbank „Galerie Heinemann online“
- Die virtuelle Ausstellung „Die Gesichter des Deutschen Kunstarchivs“
- Kathrin Fischeidl M.A. / Gudrun Schwenk B.A.: Katzen bei Stefan Moses, Video zur Korrespondenz von Stefan Moses, Germanisches Nationalmuseum 2021.
