= Markus Werner =

Swiss writer

Markus Werner (German: [vɛʀneʀ]; 27 December 1944 – 3 July 2016) was a Swiss writer, known as the author of the novels Zündels Abgang (Zündel’s Exit), Am Hang (On the Edge), and Die kalte Schulter (Cold Shoulder).

== Life ==
Markus Werner was born in Eschlikon, in the canton of Thurgau. In 1948 the family moved to Thayngen (canton of Schaffhausen) where Werner finished school and passed the general qualification for university entrance in 1965. At the university of Zürich he studied German, philosophy and psychology. In 1974 he completed a doctorate on Max Frisch, whose writing has been an important influence on Werner. From 1975 to 1985, he worked as a teacher, and from 1985 to 1990 as an assistant professor at the Kantonsschule (high school) in Schaffhausen. He dedicated himself exclusively to writing after 1990. In 2002, he was elected member of the Deutsche Akademie für Sprache und Dichtung in Darmstadt. Werner lived in Schaffhausen until his death in 2016.

== Performances ==
The protagonists of Werner's novels have quit their jobs. From their perspectives Werner laconically describes everyday life, at turns astonished, with distress, and with humour. The results are strictly calculated scenes and episodes in which the course of the world appears in too sharp and sometimes laughable details, situations that Werner's protagonists simply cannot deal with. Seemingly harmless everyday perfidies break down Werner's characters: the deaf ears of their fellow men, their cold, headstrong souls. Human deficiencies are described in a tragicomical way. Werner sees the self-evident as something strange, is astonished and wonders like a child. His protagonists want the right to make mistakes and have deficiencies ("self-assuredness is the sign of the yokel", in: Die kalte Schulter, a Chinese saying). They crave love, but at the same time curse the world and themselves.

== Awards ==
- 1984 Prize of the Jürgen Ponto Foundation
- 1984 and 1993 singular work award of the Swiss Schiller Foundation
- 1986 Georg Fischer Prize of the city Schaffhausen
- 1990 Alemannic Literature Prize
- 1993 Thomas Valentin Literature Prize
- 1995 Prix littéraire Lipp; International Bodensee Literature Prize
- 1997 Preis der SWR-Bestenliste
- 1999 Hermann-Hesse-Literaturpreis
- 2000 Joseph Breitbach Prize (jointly with Ilse Aichinger and W. G. Sebald)
- 2002 Johann Peter Hebel Prize of Baden-Württemberg
- 2005 Life achievement Award of the Swiss Schiller Foundation
- 2006 Bodensee Literature Prize

== Works ==
- Zündels Abgang (1984). Zündel's Exit, trans. Michael Hoffman (Dalkey Archive Press, 2013). ISBN 978-1-56478-921-1
- Froschnacht (1985). The Frog in the Throat, trans. Michael Hoffman (New York Review Books, 2025)
- Die kalte Schulter (1989). Cold Shoulder, trans. Michael Hoffman (Dalkey Archive Press, 2016). ISBN 978-1-943150-00-7
- Bis bald (1992). "See You Soon"
- Festland (1996). "Mainland"
- Der ägyptische Heinrich (1999). "The Egyptian Heinrich"
- Am Hang (2004). On the Edge, trans. Robert E. Goodwin (Haus Publishing, 2012; NYRB Lit, 2014). ISBN 978-1-59017-652-8
