= Alice Rivaz =

Swiss writer (1901–1998)

- Born: Alice Golay; 14 August 1901; Rovray, Switzerland
- Died: 27 February 1998 (aged 96); Genthod, Switzerland

Alice Rivaz (14 August 1901 – 27 February 1998) was a Swiss writer and feminist.

== Life ==
She was born Alice Golay in the small Swiss municipality of Rovray, in the Canton of Vaud, the only child of Paul Golay and Ida Ettler, both strong Calvinists. Her mother had been a deaconess before deciding to leave that life to marry, while her father was a school teacher at the time of her birth. With a growing embrace of socialism, he later gave up that career and became a writer for the leftist periodical, Le Grutléen, for which the family moved to Lausanne.

Alice Rivaz' later writings are thought to reflect the conflict the couple experienced as a result of their differing points of view, with her mother's piety butting up against her father's political convictions.

At the age of 25 Rivaz moved to Geneva, where she spent the rest of her life. She originally studied music, training to become a pianist. After several years of work with the International Labour Organization she turned to writing, and became one of the foremost French language writers of Switzerland. She died in that city at the age of 96 and was buried at the prestigious Cimetière des Rois in the Plainpalais district.

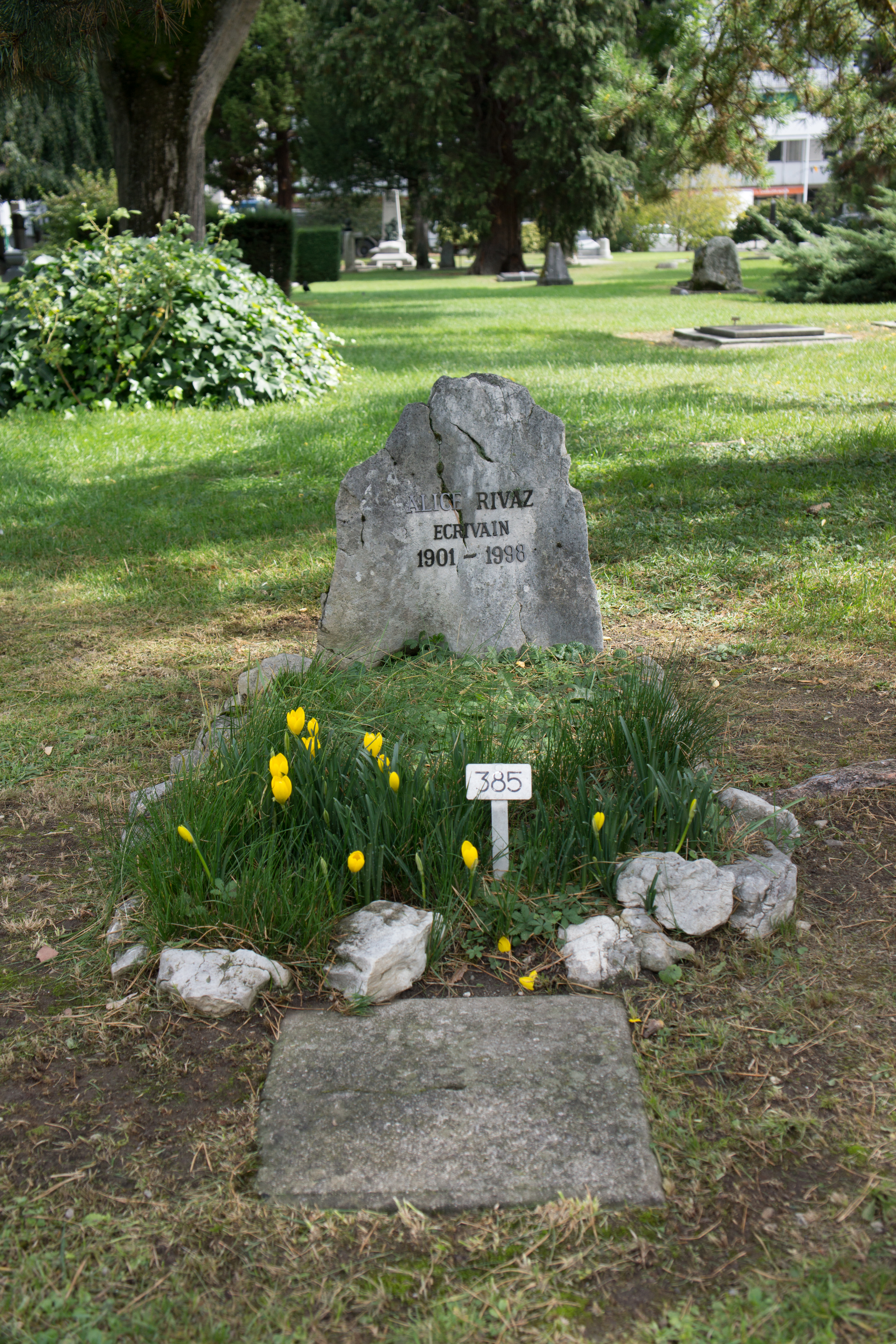
Alice Rivaz – Cimetière des Rois

In her birthplace there is a commemorative plaque. In Geneva a street and a College were named after her. And since 2002 there is even an Intercity train called Alice Rivaz.

== Writing ==
Rivaz began working on her first novel around 1937, which came to be titled Nuages dans la main (Clouds in your Hands), published in 1940. Her novel Jette ton pain (Cast your Bread), published in 1979, is considered her finest work. Her writings are known for dealing with women in art and in the family, as well as having feminist themes. Along with novels, short stories, essays and diaries she also did a study of poet Jean-Georges Lossier.

== Bibliography ==
- Nuages dans la main novel, (1940) trans. Clouds in your Hands
- Comme le sable, novel (1946)
- La Paix des ruches, novel (1947) trans. The Peace of the Beehive
- Sans Alcool (1961), short stories, trans. Without Alcohol.
- Comptez vos jours (1966)
- Le Creux de la vague, novel (1967)
- L'Alphabet du matin, novel (1968)
- De Mémoire et d'oubli, short stories (1973)
- Jette ton pain, novel (1979), trans. Cast your Bread
- Ce Nom qui n'est pas le mien, essays (1980)
- Traces de vie, diaries (1983)
- Jean-Georges Lossier. Poésie et vie intérieure, essay, 1986
- L’Homme et son enfant. Sans alcool. Le Canari, short stories, 1996
- Creuser des puits dans le désert Letters to Jean-Claude Fontanet, 2001
- Les Enveloppes bleues. Correspondance 1944–51 (with Pierre Girard), 2005
- Pourquoi serions-nous heureux? Correspondance 1945–1982 (with Jean-Georges Lossier), 2008
