= Johann Caspar Bagnato =

Baroque architect for south-west Germany and north Switzerland

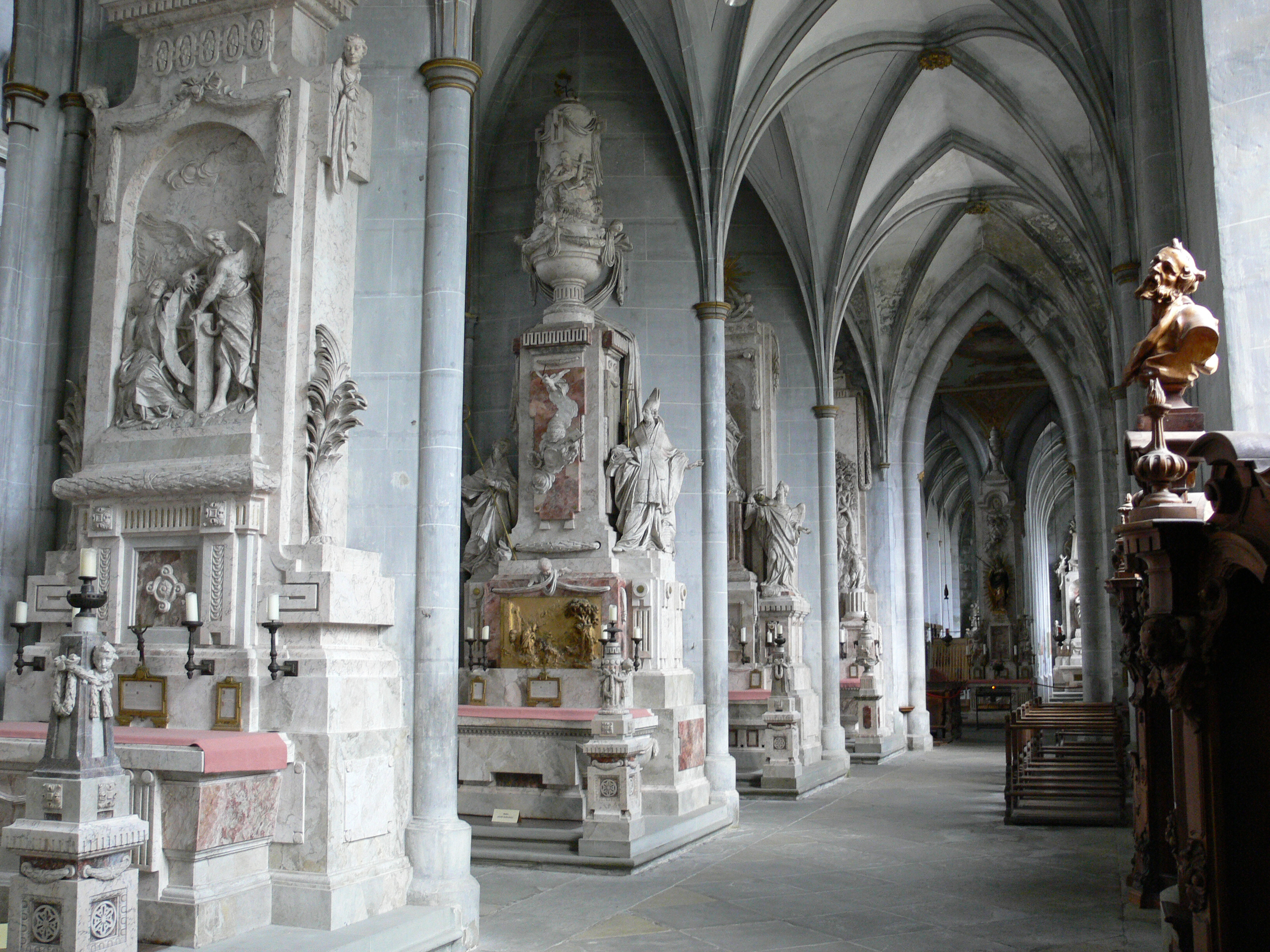
Salem Minster, nave

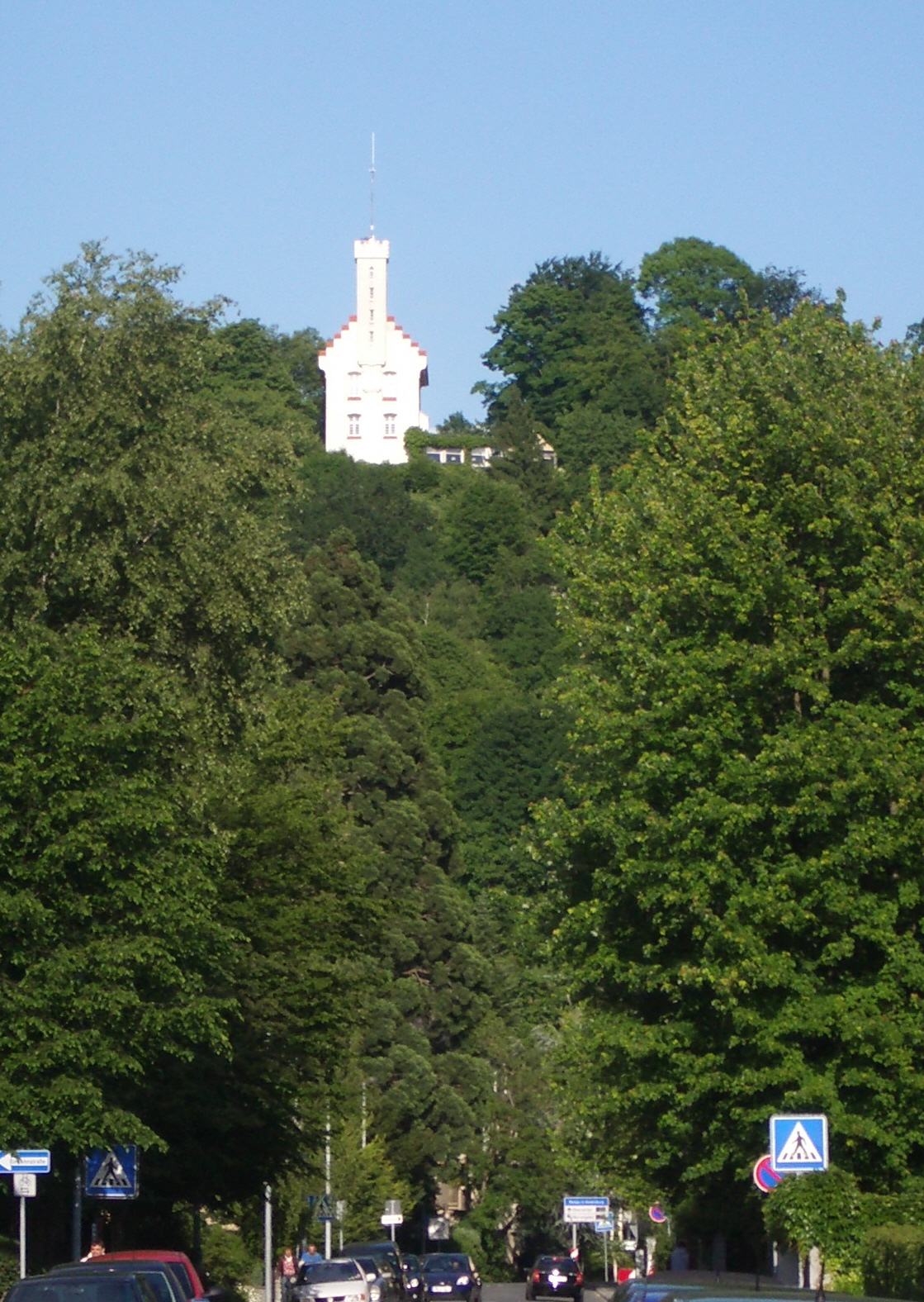
Veitsburg in Ravensburg

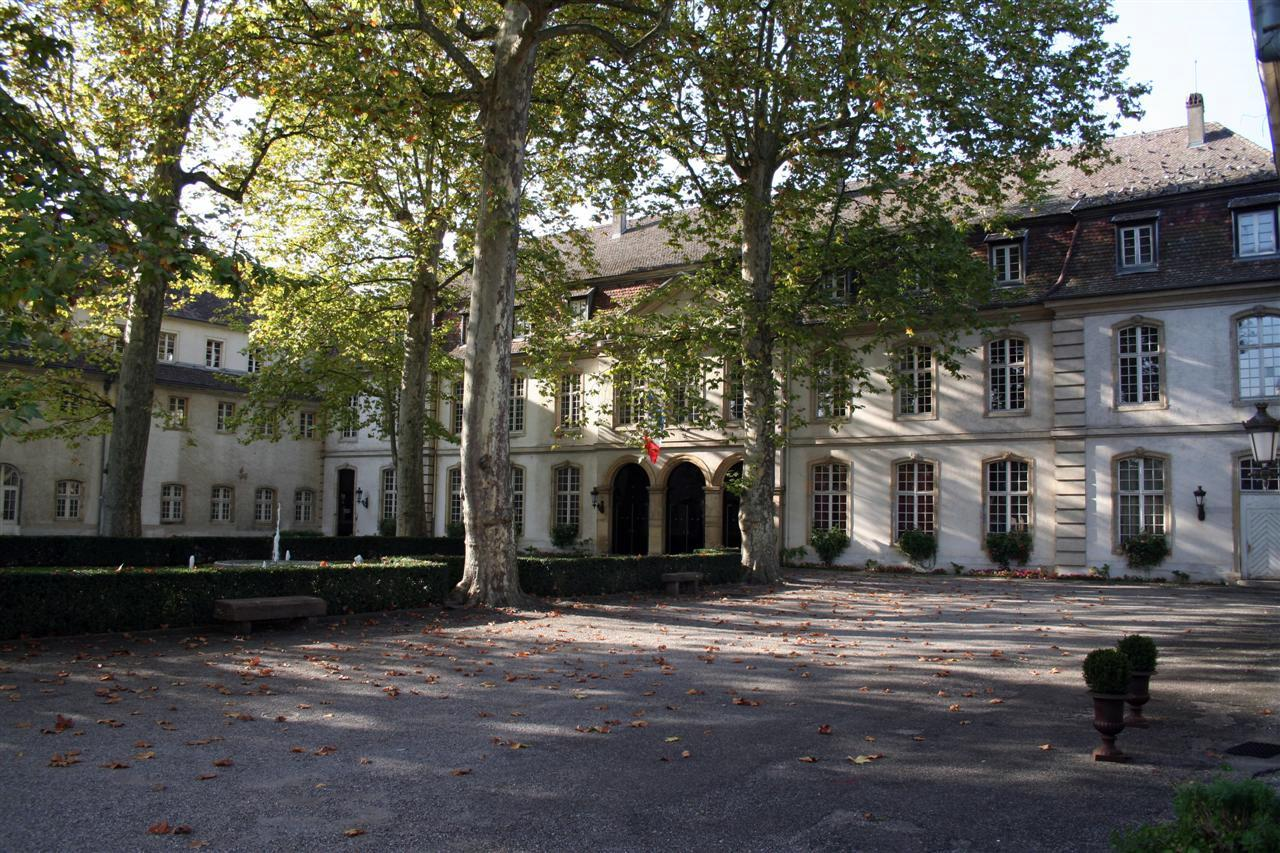
Rixheim, commandry of Teutonic Knights

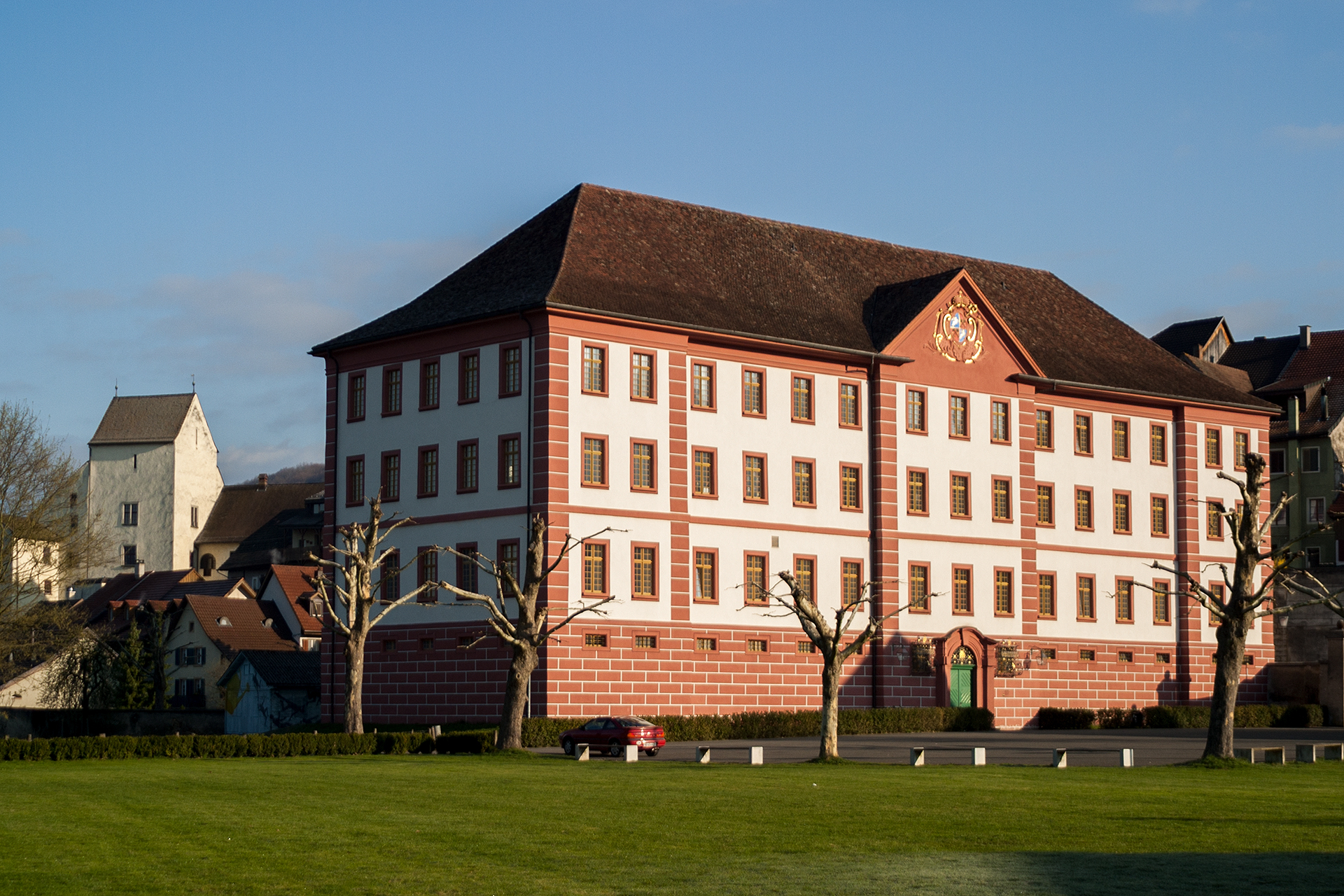
Klingnau, provost's office

Johann Caspar Bagnato (13 September 1696 – 15 July 1757), also known as Giovanni Gaspare Bagnato, was born in Landau in the Palatinate of the Rhine. He was an architect of the Baroque-period, most active in the southwest of Germany and in northern Switzerland. His father was born in Como, Italy, whereas his mother, Anna Maria Stickelmeyer, was German. His son Franz (Ignaz) Anton Bagnato (1731–1810) also worked as an architect.

In 1729, he was offered the chance to execute a major re-design of the castle in Altshausen. Most of the plans he designed for this castle were, however, never realized.

== Works ==
- 1729: extension of Castle Altshausen.
- 1731-1733: church St Madgalena in Friedberg near Saulgau.
- 1732: St Martin's chapel in Meßkirch.
- from 1732: St Mary's church, Mainau island.
- 1733: alteration of minster St Verena in Zurzach.
- 1737: stables and coach building at the castle of the Freiherrn of Zimmern in Meßkirch.
- from 1739: castle of the Teutonic Knights on Mainau island.
- ca. 1740: yard and gateway at castle Dillingen/Danube.
- 1744: commandry of the Order of St. John in Tobel-Tägerschen, Canton Thurgau, Switzerland.
- 1747: church St Otmar in Bremelau near Münsingen.
- 1747-1748: Chapel of the Holy Cross in Oberdorf, Konstanz.
- from 1747: extension of monastery in Obermarchtal.
- ca. 1750: project for a church in St Gallen, Switzerland (not executed).
- from 1751: Baroque castle Veitsburg, Ravensburg.
- 1750-1757: minster at Salem, redesign of interior and adding a turret.
- 1752-1757: renovation, redesign and extension of castle Beuggen near Rheinfelden in Baden.
- 1753-1755: church St Afra in Obernheim.
- 1745 and 1754: provost's office building in Klingnau in Canton Aargau, Switzerland.
- 1754: house in St. Blasien, later to be called Bagnato-building.
- from 1754: choir and sacristy of church St Blasius in Ehingen.
- commandry of Teutonic Knights at Rixheim.

== See also ==
- Upper Swabian Baroque Route
