= Christoph Daniel Schenck =

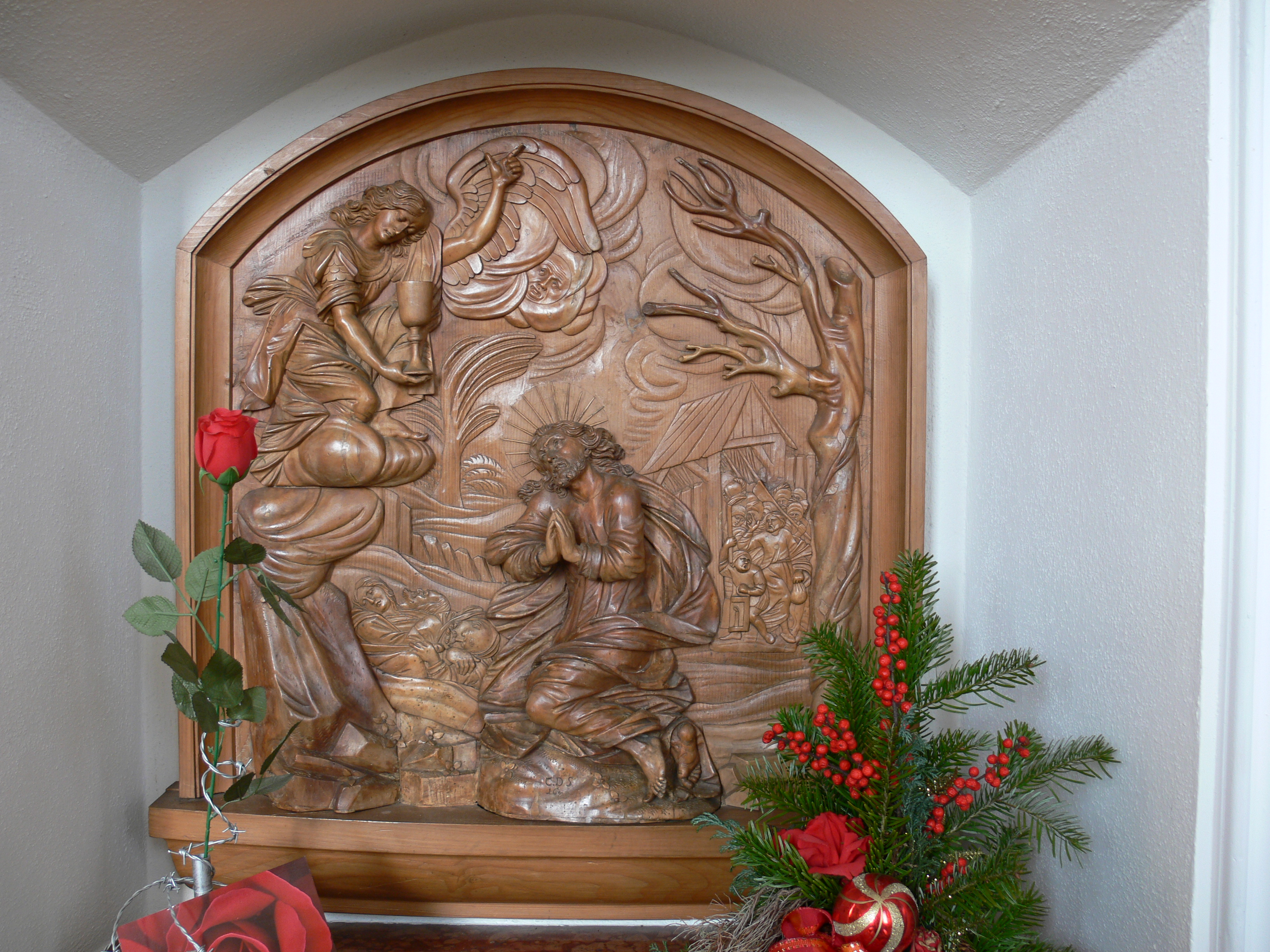
Relief, Agony in the Garden, Pfarrkirche Kluftern

Christoph Daniel Schenck (before 26 August 1633 – 1691) was a German sculptor, also known as Christophorus Schenck or Christoph Daniel Schenk. Christoph-Daniel-Schenk-Straße is named after him in Konstanz, the city where he was born and died.

He was born into a family of sculptors in Konstanz, which was mainly active in the Bodensee, Upper Swabia and North Swiss regions, and trained under his father. He was mainly active during the Catholic Reformation, during which many monasteries and churches were redesigned and refurnished.

He is best known for this Baroque religious works, mainly small ones made of boxwood and ivory. He also produced several wooden sculptures and figures for altars.

== Selected works ==
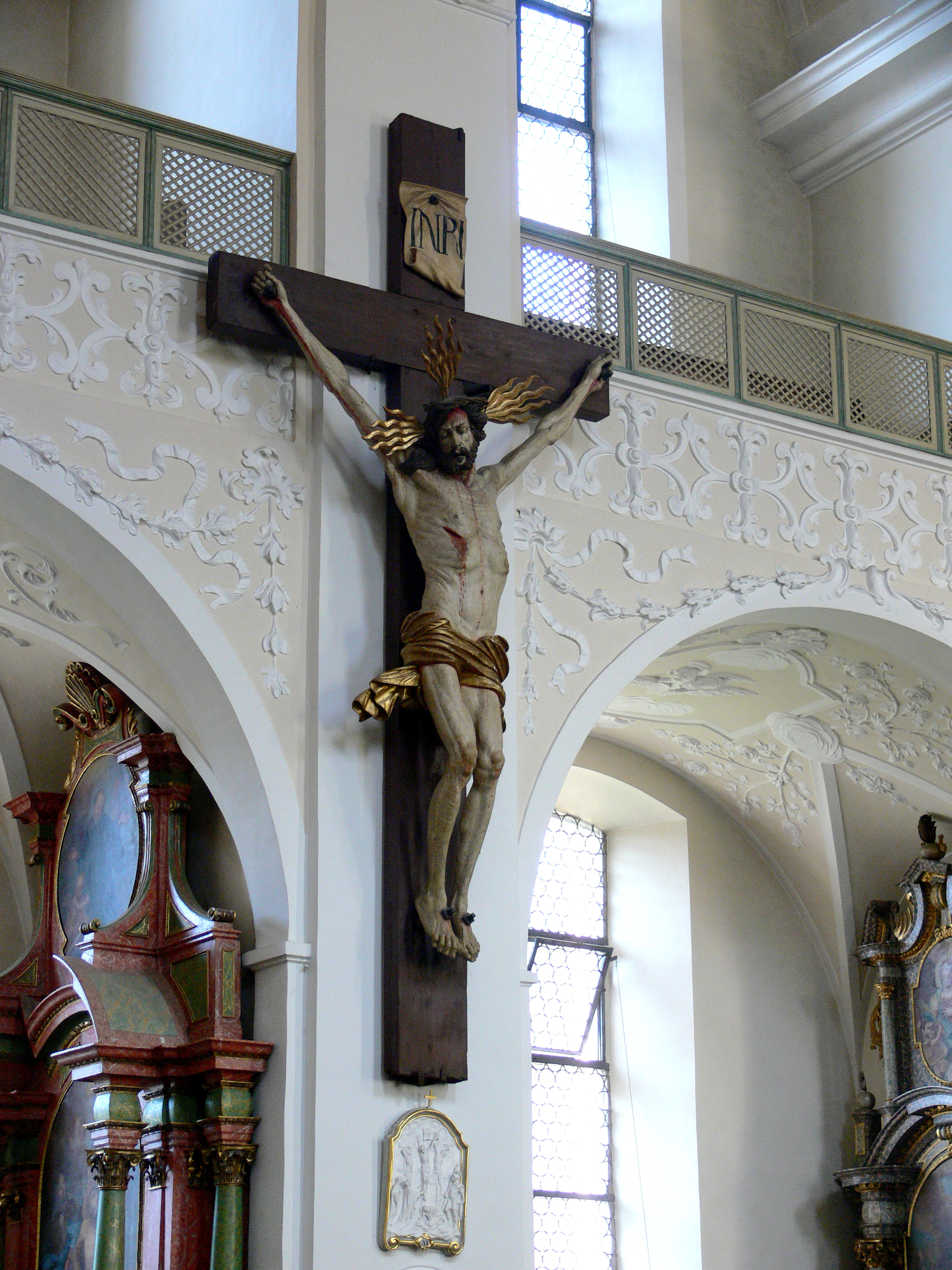
Mission Cross in Klosterkirche St. Trudpert

- colossal high altar at Salem Minster, whose figures were largely destroyed in the fire of 1697 (1627–1633)
- The Archangel Michael Overcoming Satan (c. 1645/50 and/or 1675)
- Christ with an Angel outside the tower of St.-Laurentius-Kirche in Tengen (c. 1650)
- Samson (1670) in the Augustinermuseum Freiburg
- Penitent Magdalene (1679)
- Penitent St Peter (1679)
- The Conversion of St Paul (1685)
- Christ Mocked (1685) in the J. Paul Getty Museum, Los Angeles
- Epitaph in the choir of the Stephanskirche in Lindau with the grave monument of Valentin Heider from Lindau
- Altar in the north transept (Thomaschor) of Konstanz Minster

== Bibliography (in German) ==
- Wilhelm Boeck: Das unbekannte Werk des Konstanzer Bildschnitzers Christoph Daniel Schenck. In: Das Münster. Zeitschrift für christliche Kunst und Kunstgeschichte, Jg. 6 (1953), Heft 3/4, S. 66–74.
- Fritz Fischer and others.: Christoph Daniel Schenck 1633–1691. Thorbecke, Sigmaringen 1996, ISBN 3-7995-3153-X (catalogue for the exhibition of the same name at the Rosgartenmuseum, Konstanz, 21 September to 10 November 1996).
- Fritz Fischer: Christoph Daniel Schenck und Johann Caspar Schenck. Zwei vorderösterreichische Künstler?. In: Schwäbische Heimat, Jg. 50 (1999), Heft 1, S. 37–40
- Rainer Kahsnitz, Peter Volk (ed.): Die Skulptur in Süddeutschland 1400–1770. Festschrift für Alfred Schädler. Deutscher Kunstverlag München 1998, ISBN 3-422-06220-3.
- Brigitte Lohse: Christoph Daniel Schenck. Ein Konstanzer Meister des Barock (Thorbecke-Kunstbücherei volume 10). Thorbecke, Konstanz 1960.
- Lore Noack-Heuck: Zum Werk des Konstanzer Bildschnitzers Christoph Daniel Schenck und seiner Werkstatt. In: Das Münster 23, 1970, S. 28–40.
