= Salem Minster =

- Minster of Our Lady
- Salemer Münster
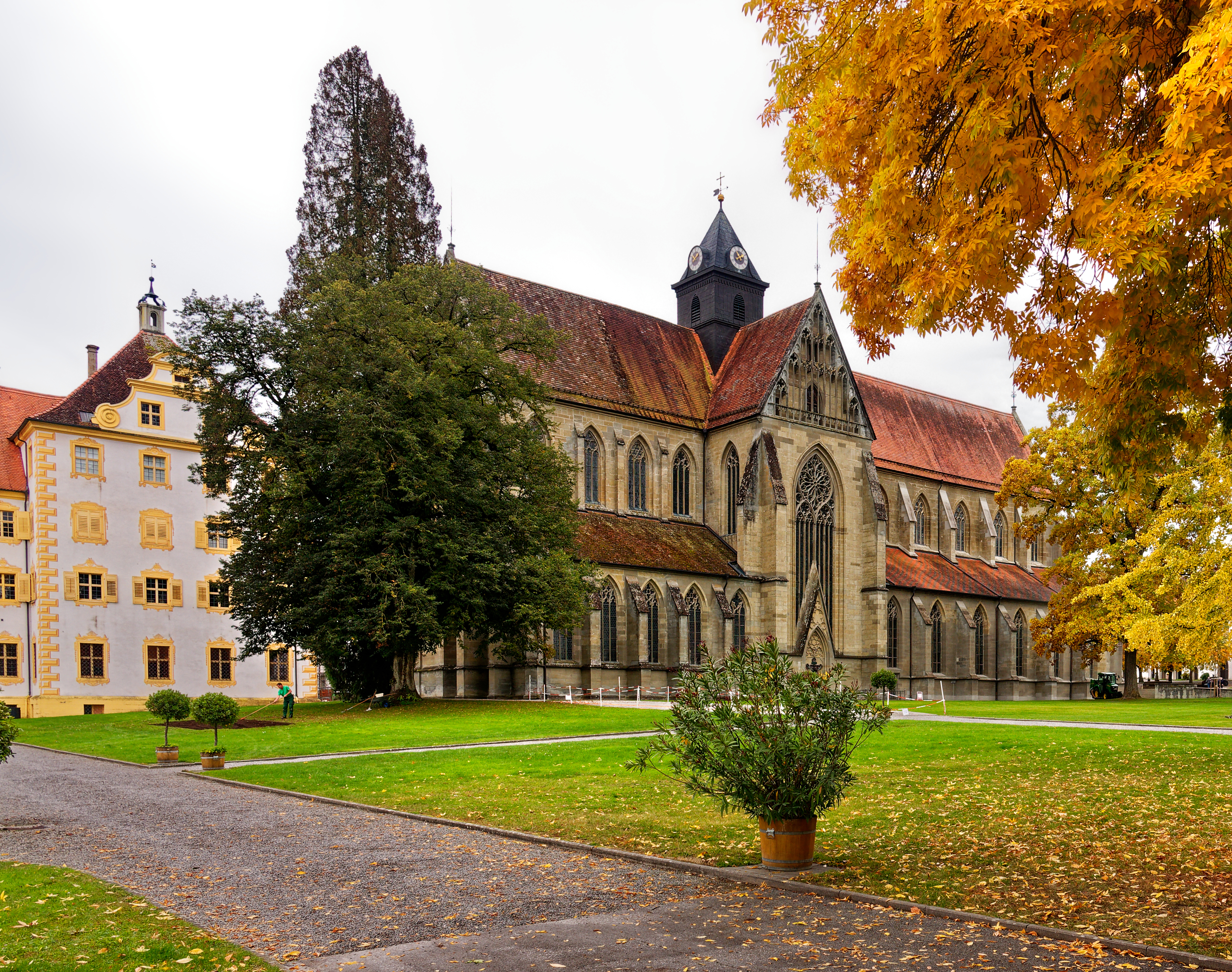
- Salem Minster, North face (2020)

- Location in Germany
- 47°46′36″N 9°16′38″E
- Location: Salem, Baden-Württemberg
- Country: Germany
- Denomination: Catholic
- Website: https://www.salem.de/

History
- Consecrated: December 23, 1414

Architecture
- Functional status: Active
- Architectural type: High Gothic
- Groundbreaking: 1285

Administration
- Archdiocese: Archdiocese of Freiburg

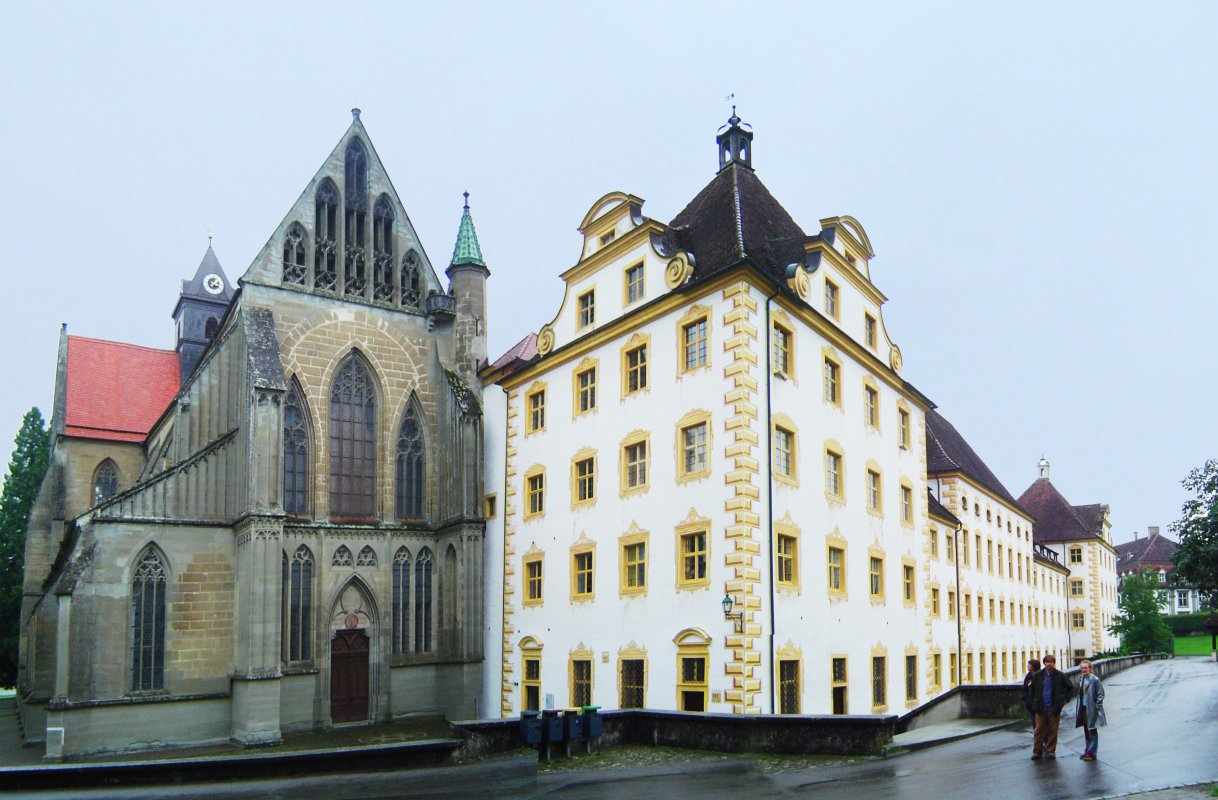
Minster and abbey, seen from the west (2005)

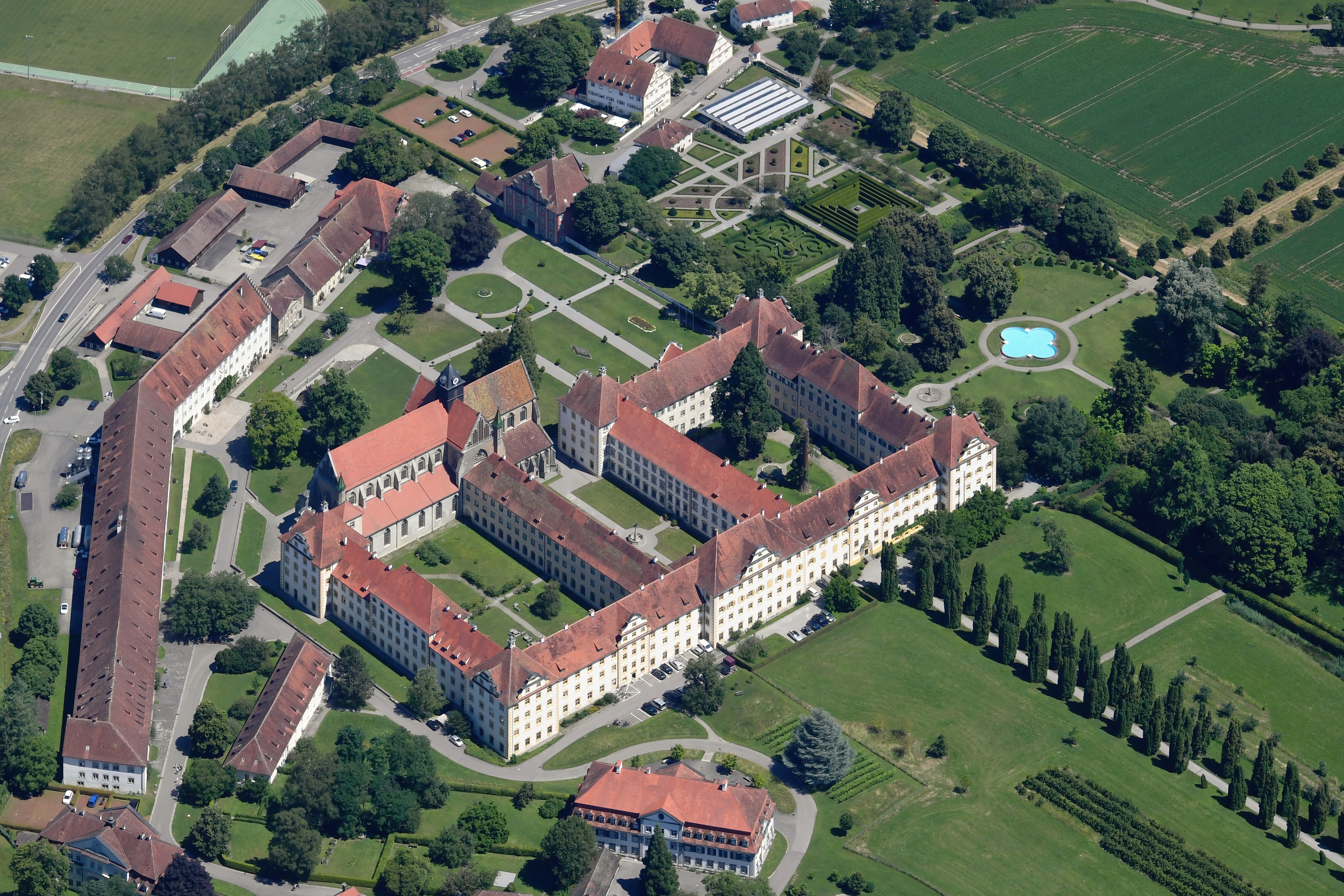
Aerial view of the Salem minster in the Salem abbey

Salem Minster (German: Salemer Münster) is the Roman Catholic parish church of the community of Salem, Baden-Württemberg and was the abbey church of the former imperial abbey of Salem. It was built in Gothic architecture from around 1285 to 1420 as a three-aisled columned basilica and is one of the most important High Gothic Cistercian buildings in the German-speaking world. The exterior of the church largely corresponds to the original design, while alterations to the interior have had a lasting effect on the sense of space within. The inventory includes furnishings from the late Gothic, Baroque, Rococo and Classicist periods. It is the third largest Gothic church in Baden-Württemberg after Ulm Minster and Freiburg Minster.

== First monastery church ==
In 1137, a delegation of Cistercians from the Lützel monastery (Upper Alsace) arrived in the Salmannsweiler district on Lake Constance to found the Salem monastery. At the time of settlement, there was already a chapel there, which was subject to the double patronage of St. Verena and St. Cyriac. This chapel was demolished around 1150 for the construction of a new monastery church.

No structural evidence of the first monastery church has survived. If the church of the primary abbey of Clairvaux and the churches of Lützel, Kaisheim and other Cistercian monasteries built at the same time allow conclusions to be drawn, it was a three-aisled basilica with a cruciform ground plan in the Romanesque style. According to Knapp (2004), the transept may have been divided into three chapels on the north side and two east-facing chapels on the south side, in addition to the central rectangular apse. It is documented that it was built entirely of stone and had at least eight altars, the first four of which were consecrated by the Bishop of Chur and the Bishop of Constance on September 13, 1152. The church itself was consecrated on July 14, 1179 after around 30 years of construction. It was demolished a century later to make way for the construction of the minster.

== Construction Period ==
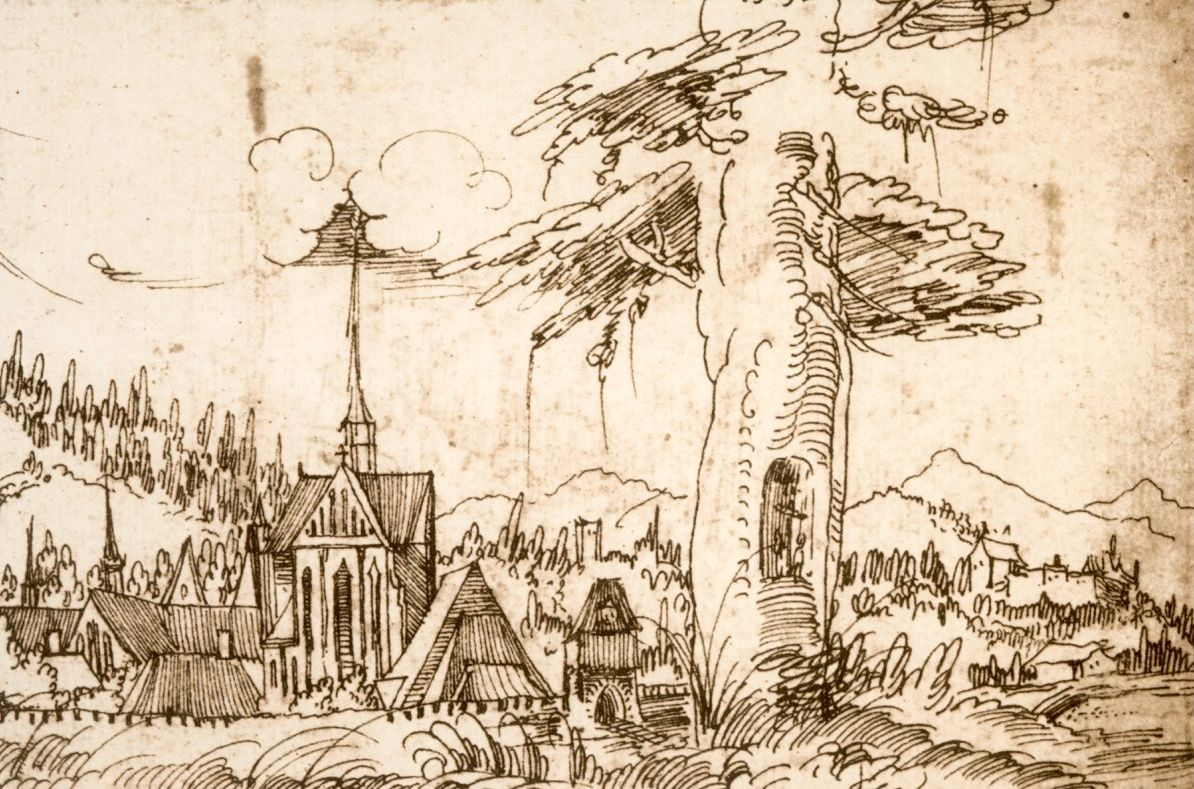
Oldest known representation of the Salem Minster, created in 1536 by Augustin Hirschvogel

Until the death of Frederick II in 1250, the monastery was under the protection of the Hohenstaufen kings. The power vacuum in the Holy Roman Empire that followed his death was exploited by the monastery's neighbors to take hold of its possessions. The ascension of Rudolf I in 1273 ended the interregnum, after which he took Salem under his protection and ensured that the lost property was returned. Thanks to the income secured in this way and a series of letters of indulgence issued in the 1280s, the monastery found itself in a financial position to build a new, larger church. The building of the minster thus also documents a new era in the history of the monastery - the beginning of Habsburg protection, which was to secure the monastery's independence in the following centuries.

The initiator of the new building was Abbot Ulrich II von Seelfingen (1282-1311). The main reason for the new building was probably that the old church had become too small for the convent, which had grown to around 300 monks and lay brothers within a few decades. For a long time, it was thought that the new building was started in 1299; however, more recent building surveys and the connection between the church building and Rudolf I's policy of revindication suggest that construction began around 1285. Rather than roughly hewn quarry stones, as in the previous church, large blocks of hewn sandstone were used for the new building, which came from quarries in the surrounding area. The workers and planners were probably mostly lay brothers, some of whom were also active beyond Salem, for example in the construction of the tower of the Bebenhausen monastery church.

Construction began on the east side and progressed rapidly at first. Eleven altars were consecrated in 1307; twelve more were consecrated in 1313 and 1319. When the choir and transept were completed and roofed around 1319, construction was only continued slowly, if not temporarily halted. The number of monks had decreased since 1300, so that the already roofed room under the eastern nave provided sufficient space for the convent.

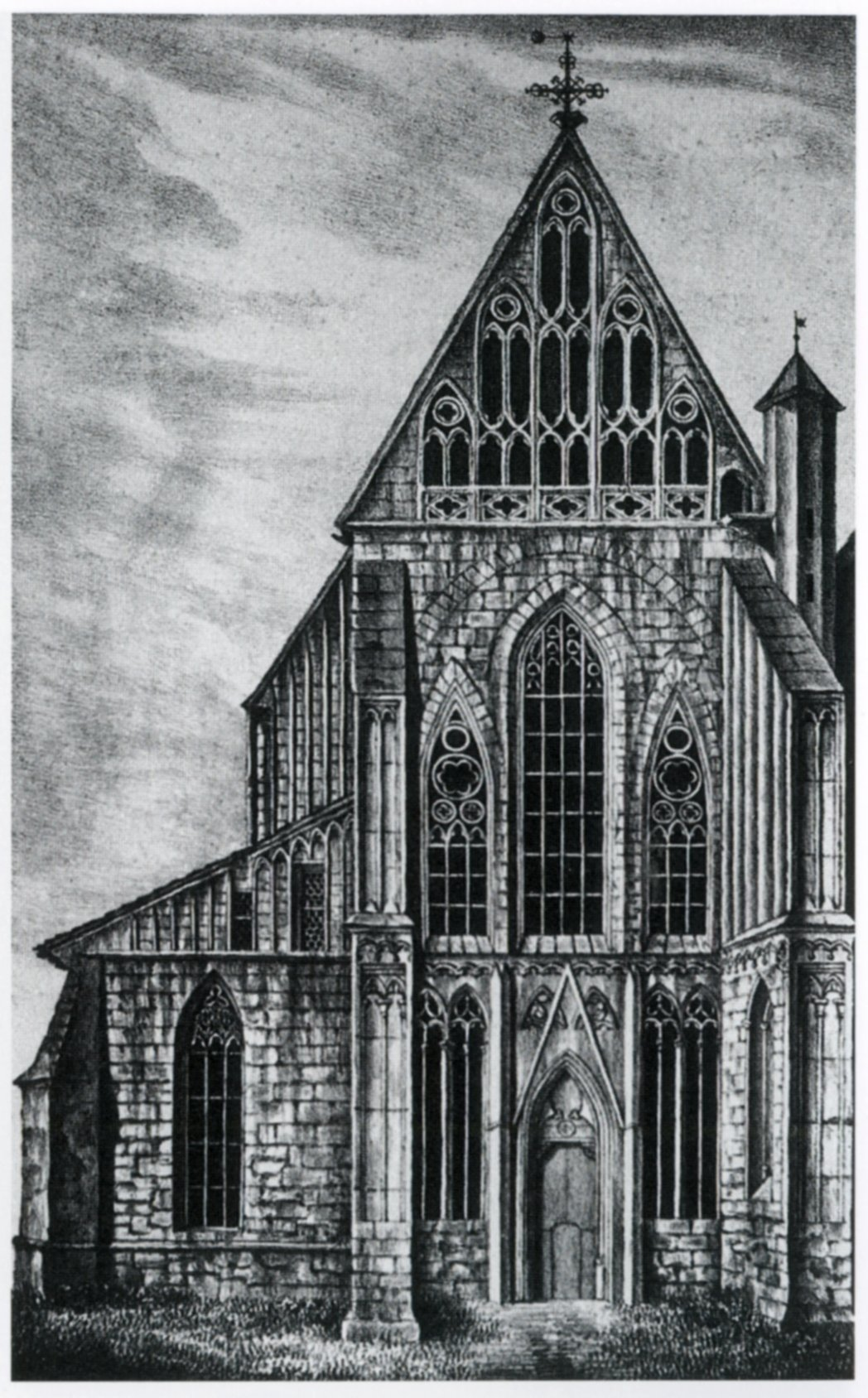
The tracery on the west façade was only completed in the final construction phase. This lithograph from 1823 shows the façade in its original state before the changes caused by the restoration of 1890

The interruption was initially due to financial problems, as Louis the Bavarian, an opponent of the Pope, was in power from 1314 to 1347, who revoked the Habsburg protection over Salem and thus terminated the legal security of many estates. After Louis' successor Charles IV affirmed the abbey's rights again, the plague struck southern Germany in 1348. It was not until around 1400 that the building could be continued and completely rebuilt in the 1420s, as recent dendrochronological studies have shown. The construction period of around 150 years is nevertheless quite short in comparison, as many Gothic church buildings remained incomplete for a long time or, like Ulm Minster, were only completed in the Gothic-inspired 19th century.

The church was consecrated even before construction was completed. Abbot Jodokus Senner took advantage of the Council of Constance, which had begun in 1414, and invited the Archbishop of Salzburg Eberhard III, who was present there, to consecrate the church. Eberhard III probably felt a connection to Salem because his predecessor in office, Eberhard II, had taken the monastery under his protection around 200 years previously. It is likely that King Sigismund was also present at the consecration of the church on December 23, 1414, as he had spent the night in the Salem town courtyard in Überlingen the day before and arrived at the council on December 24.

With Salem as a pioneer, Gothic architecture had found its way from Strasbourg on the Upper Rhine to Lake Constance: At around the same time, the diocese of Constance also had Constance Minster modernized in the Gothic style, and shortly after the completion of construction in Salem, work began in the neighbouring imperial city of Überlingen to expand the parish church of St. Nicholas into a five-aisled basilica to surpass Salem.

== Architecture ==
=== Building Structure ===
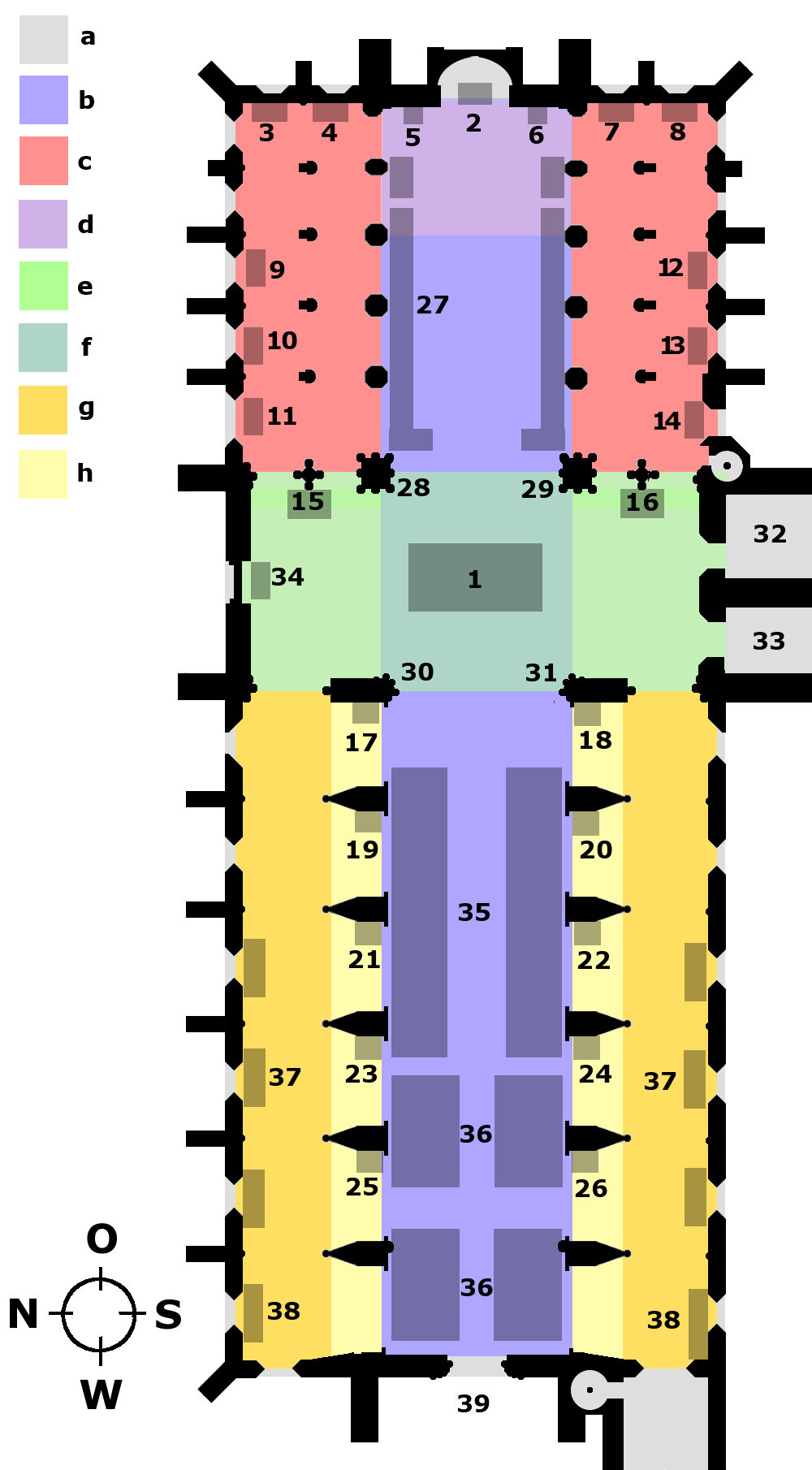
Ground plan of the Minster with Furnishings

The minster is integrated into the monastery precinct and is barely taller than it. Today, the austere, simple forms of the church contrast with its expansive baroque architectural style. The architectural reduction of the Salem church, which is only broken up by individual decorative elements on the façade, demonstratively distances itself from the pomp of the official church cathedrals and the monastery architecture of the Cluniac monks.

To the south is the cloister, which leads directly to the convent building. This entrance, known as St. Bernard's Portal, served as the entrance for the monks, while other churchgoers used the west portal. Another portal - closed since 1750 - can be found on the north side of the transept; it originally served as a separate entrance for high-ranking guests.

Salem Minster is a three-aisled basilica with transept, choir and ambulatory on a rectangular base measuring 67 × 28 m (external dimensions); the narrow, tall structure of the transept does not protrude laterally beyond the basic quadrangle. The dimensions of Salem Minster are roughly the same as those of Constance Minster and its length is similar to that of Basel Minster. The building material is finely textured molasse sandstone in yellow-grey, greenish and brown tones, which is unrendered on the outside. The monastery church in Kappel am Albis and the Petershausen monastery cathedral, which no longer exists today, may have served as regional models for the cruciform building. As Petershausen, like Salem, had become independent from the diocese of Constance and Salem wanted to demonstrate this independence, the Petershausen monastery church was probably the direct model for Salem Minster.

The roof ridge of the transept extends up to the 32 m high ridge of the central nave. The gabled roofs of the nave and transept tower over the low side aisles with their mono-pitched roofs by around twice as much. The roof truss above the high choir dates back in part to 1301. Original glazed roof tiles, which once gave the roof a golden sheen, have been preserved on the south side of the choir; until it was re-roofed in 1997, the entire roof of the nave was still largely covered with tiles from the period of construction.

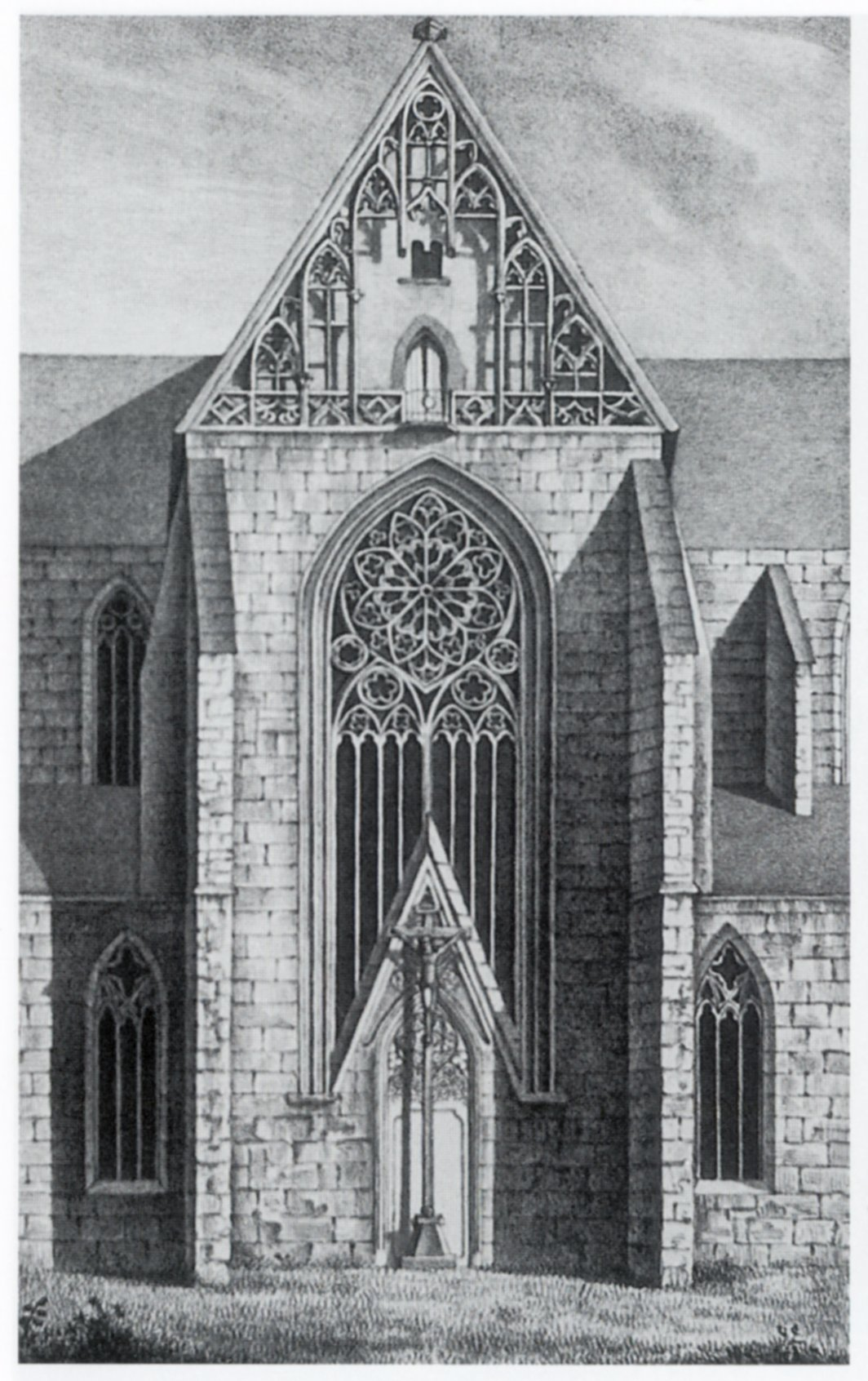
The window on the north façade: the representative north side of the minster as it was before the restoration of 1890, when the window was reduced in size

On the outside of the building, only the harp gables and the lancet windows lend a certain filigree to the architecturally rather coarse building. The west front is surmounted by a high triangular harp gable, the basic shape of which, an equilateral triangle, could be understood as a worship of the Trinity in medieval numerical mysticism. Two mighty buttresses support the façade and frame the entrance to the church. The design of the gables is repeated in a similar form on the east side and on the south and north sides of the transept.

Ten tracery windows on each side of the central nave (clerestory) provide light to the interior. Six of these are located to the west and four to the east of the transept. The side aisles have one more window axis, as the window arches of the eastern nave have been further apart than the bays of the ambulatory since the renovation of 1750. There are further tracery windows on the four gables of the church, although the windows on the east side were bricked up during the remodeling of the interior around 1750. The front side of the northern transept also has a large eight-pane fan-shaped rose window based on the model of Strasbourg Cathedral, which proves that it was designed as a showpiece side of the church. The tracery lattice in front of the gable wall with staggered two-lane lancets, which are connected horizontally by cloverleaf shapes, was probably also modeled on Strasbourg.

=== Tower Construction (1753–1757) ===
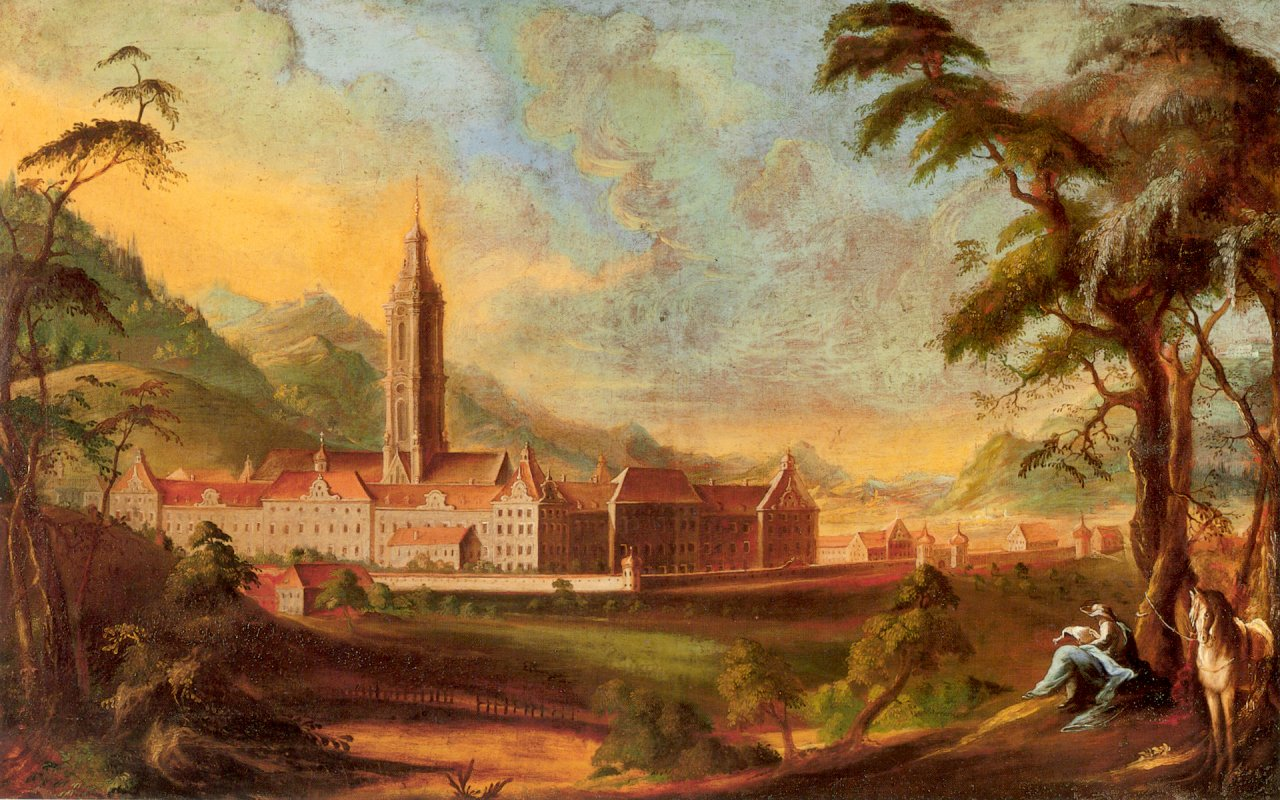
Salem with the tower of Abbot Anselm II Schwab. Oil painting by Andreas Brugger around 1765

In accordance with the rules of the Cistercian order, which demanded simplicity and modesty, the minster was not given a church tower, but only a simple ridge turret to carry the bells. This changed in the 18th century: in 1697, a fire destroyed almost the entire monastery building. The building survived the fire largely undamaged, while a large part of the inventory was destroyed in the flames. When the monastery complex was rebuilt by the Vorarlberg master builder Franz Beer between 1697 and 1708, the minster was in danger of disappearing visually behind the huge complex of buildings. Beer therefore planned a free-standing bell tower, but this was not built.

Abbot Anselm II Schwab (in office 1746-1778), who had already demonstrated his sense of prestige with the construction of the Birnau pilgrimage church, could no longer resist the temptation to equip the church with a magnificent crossing tower. The master builder Johann Caspar Bagnato, who had made a name for himself with the construction of Altshausen Castle, was commissioned to plan and build the tower in 1753, and it was completed in 1756. The tower was constructed using timber framing and clad with copper panels. The corner pilasters were made of lead and decorated with bronze, so that from a distance the tower did not look any different from masonry towers of this type, but must have appeared even more magnificent in its copper sheen. With the gilded spire knob, which itself was almost two meters in diameter, the tower reached a height of over 85 meters - more than fifty meters higher than the roof ridge of the nave. Sixteen new bells decorated with reliefs and a new clock mechanism were purchased.

=== Interior ===
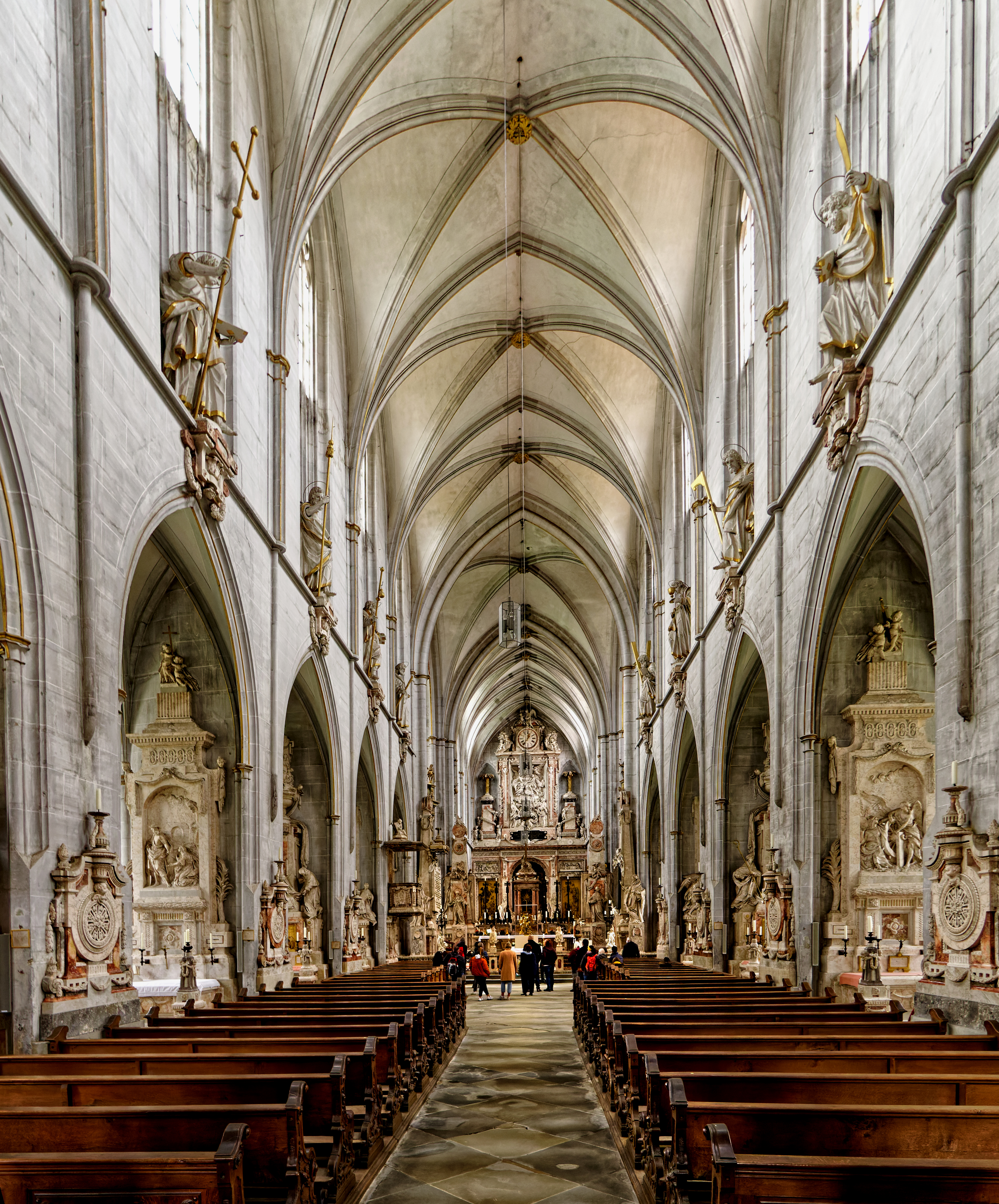
Middle View

The central nave and side aisles are covered by Gothic cross vaults. The vault of the nave is supported by pillars in an asymmetrical "icebreaker" shape: Towards the nave, they present themselves as rectangular pillars whose bulky shape is tempered by slender bundles of columns; towards the side aisles, they terminate at an acute angle, making the vault appear lighter and the side aisles more spacious. For reasons of statics, the pillars were drawn far into the depths, replacing special buttresses on the outside. This construction method created spaces between the pillars for small side chapels, which in turn are vaulted with cross ribs, creating the impression of an additional side aisle.

The eastern parts of the side aisles are each divided into two narrower naves by rows of columns and ribbed vaults. The outer supports are designed as slender pillars that end in three-quarter columns towards the central nave. The pillars, which lie directly between the choir and the ambulatory, have an octagonal cross-section.They belong to the oldest construction phase and document an orientation towards an older architectural style, such as that characteristic of the church of Lilienfeld Abbey. Overall, the columns of the ambulatory are much slimmer than the massive pillars of the western nave, making the choir room appear lighter and brighter. The visible supporting elements were therefore concealed or reshaped in favor of the overall visual effect of the interior. This development, which is typical of the beginning of German High Gothic in contrast to French Gothic, is also evident in the conception of the interior as a sculptural spatial shell to be designed.

=== Conversion of the Choir Polygon ===
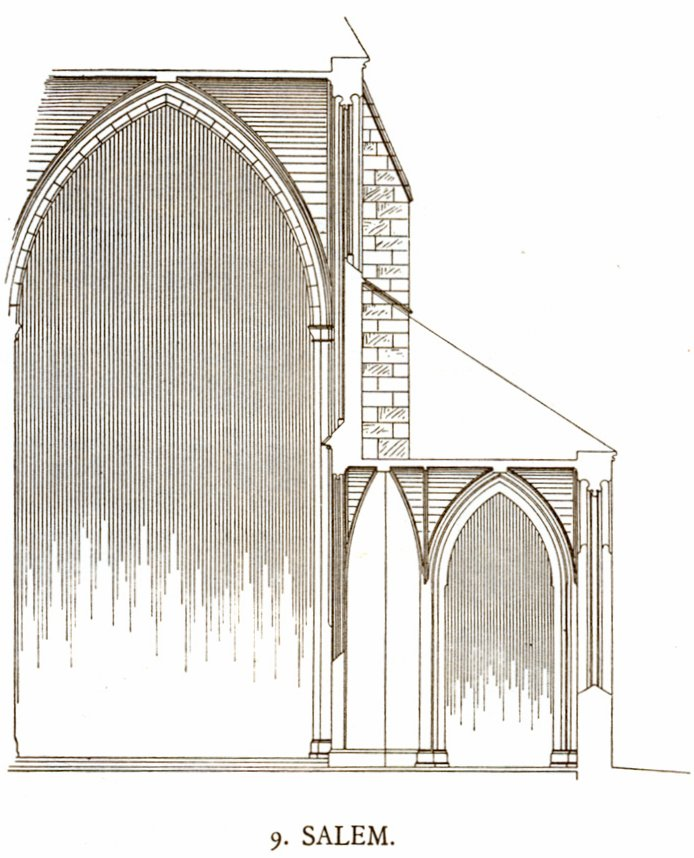
Cross-section of the nave and ambulatory

Until 1750, the eastern central nave (choir) had a gallery with a polygonal end on three sides, following the example of the monastery church in Morimond. Above the westernmost bay of the choir, the vaulting created an upper storey, where there was probably a small chapel dedicated to the Virgin Mary, all the angels and St. Michael the Archangel. The windows of the west façade, which were still uncovered at the time, allowed light to fall through the rows of columns of the choir and the upper storey, creating a mystical lighting effect.

One of the reasons for the conversion was space problems: As early as 1708, the monastery chronicle Apiarium Salemitanum complained about the large crowds of lay people and the "immense concursus" in the church. Abbot Anselm feared that the monastery's discipline could be disturbed too much by this contact with the people. The high altar was therefore moved under the crossing and the choir stalls to the east side of the now extended nave. Previously, the laity and monks had only been separated by a wooden barrier (rood screen), but now the fathers were completely alone. The medieval play of light was lost and gave way to a frontal, theatrical spatial effect; instead, the choir was now better lit, as more light entered the room through additional windows in the upper part of the nave.

== Equipment ==
=== Equipment Phases ===
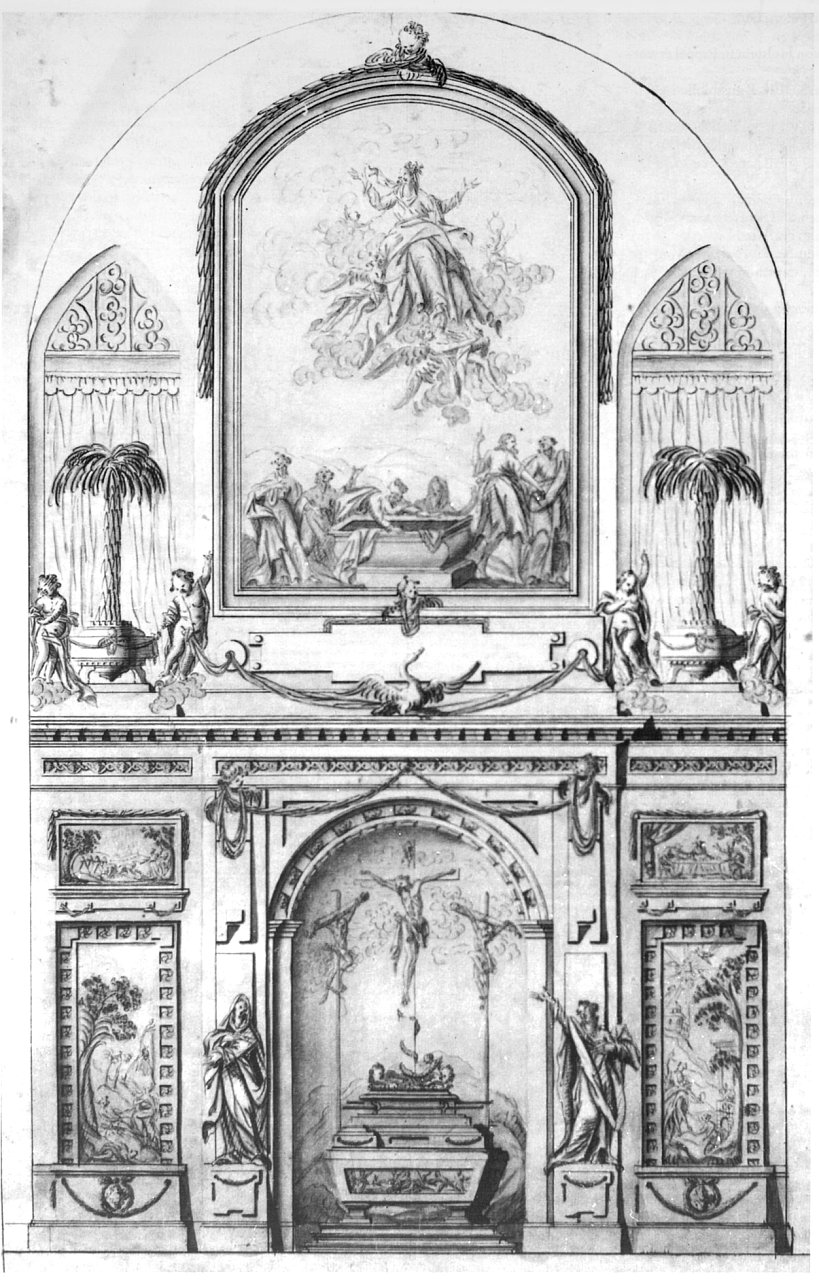
Classicist structure on the east wall with the Chapel of St. Verena in the lower part

For the Cistercians, simplicity in design and a renunciation of color also applied to the interior of the church. While the official church and orders such as the Cluniacs invested their wealth in the magnificent decoration of the churches, the Cistercians feared that the lavish pictorial decoration could distract the monks from their piety. However, the urge to decorate could not always be stopped: The designers of Salem Minster no longer held back as much as they had in the early days of the order's art. However, gilded keystones, painted vault ribs and colored elements in the otherwise colorless windows, as one would expect in Salem, were not welcomed by the order's leadership. The church furnishings were also to be made of the simplest materials, a principle that could no longer be consistently enforced in the late Middle Ages. The furnishings thus always appeared to be a compromise between the spiritual obligation to renounce and the abbots' need for prestige, who ultimately had to compete with the prince-bishops not only on a religious but also on a political level.

==== Late Middle Ages ====
Little is known about the furnishings of the 14th and 15th centuries, and even less has survived. The fragments that can be attributed to the furnishings of the abbey church, adjoining buildings or the manor houses are now widely scattered. Wooden sculptures and panel paintings can be linked to the Cistercian abbey insofar as they probably belonged to the former furnishings or can at least be proven to have been in Salem's possession at a later date.

At the time, the interior walls of the minster were simply whitewashed and decorated with green, red and ochre trim as well as decorative ornaments. Abbot Johannes I Stantenat (1471-1494) had the windows of the nave renewed, the stone tabernacle built, and a carved wooden altar made, in addition to structural repairs; the reredos carved by Michel Erhart around 1494 was probably lost apart from a few wooden figures.

According to the rules of the order, the large and numerous windows were only allowed to be painted with simple grisailles so as not to violate the commandments of simplicitas (simplicity) and humilitas (humility). Art historians assume that colored and figural elements were also incorporated; however, there is no indication as to whether and to what extent the windows were colored. Glass craftsmen are documented in the rich Salem sources: "Item domum adiacentem, quam pictores et vitrorum artifices frequentius inhabitare consueverunt."

==== Early Baroque ====
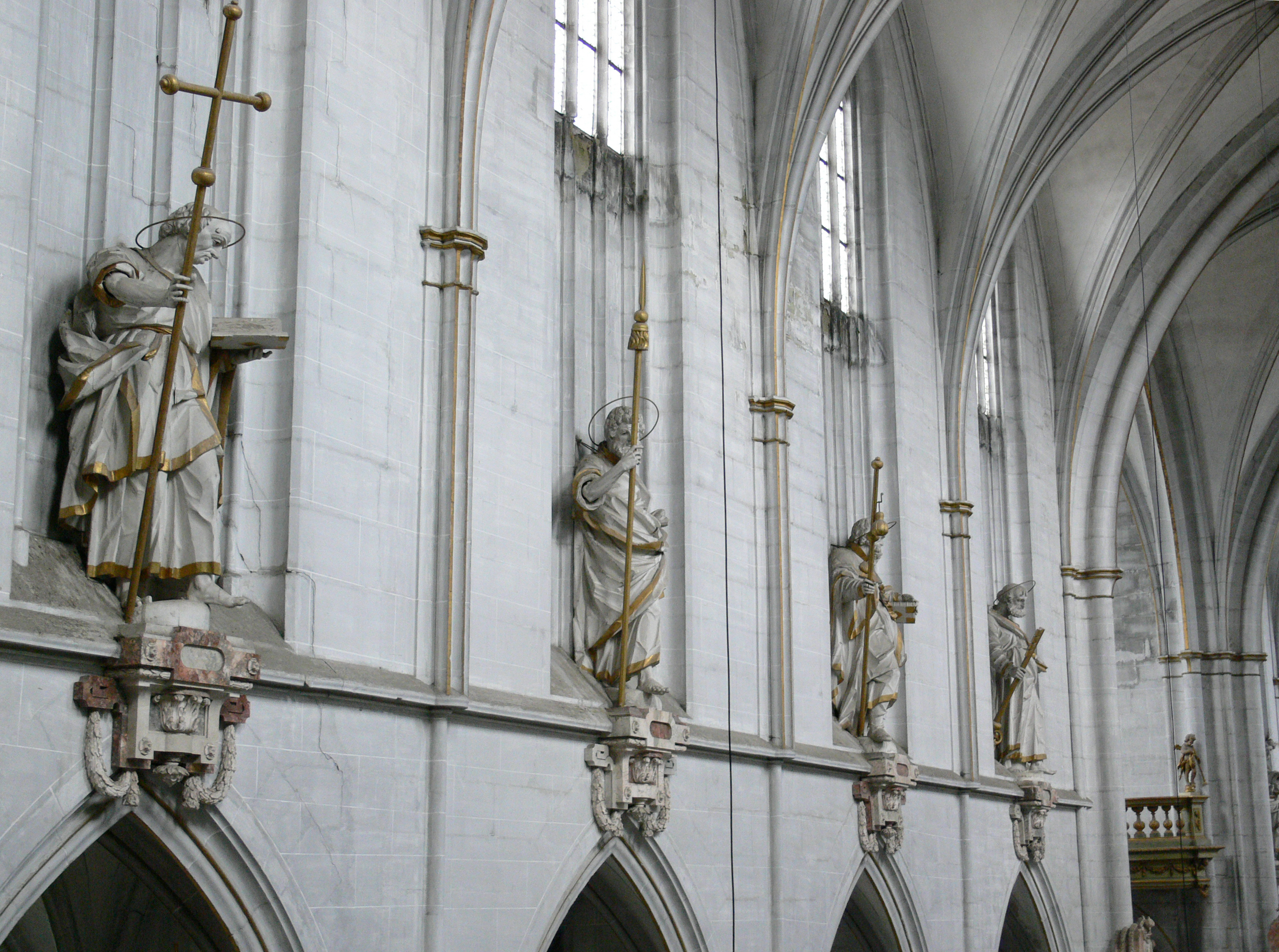
Early Baroque Apostle figures

Around 1620, the monastery gained a high status within the order with the founding of the Upper German Cistercian Congregation, which was based in Salem. At the same time, the new liturgy of the Tridentine Mass was introduced in Salem, which required new sacred objects and a reorganization of the church interior. Abbot Thomas I Wunn (1615-1647) took the increased importance of his monastery and the necessary spatial reorganization as an opportunity to have the entire room refurnished and redecorated. The work carried out between 1627 and 1633 is considered to be the earliest complete Baroque decoration in southern Germany. The sculptor Christoph Daniel Schenck created a colossal high altar whose wood carvings (which were largely destroyed in the fire of 1697) reached almost 20 meters in height under the vault of the nave. It had numerous carved figures, some of which were larger than life. The patron saints of the church (patrocinia) were painted in gold, while others were painted in a naturalistic style or kept in plain white. The large number of carved figures on the high altar was complemented by a dozen larger-than-life wooden apostle figures. The walls were whitewashed in gray and painted with a network of grouting, the facings of the clerestory were decorated and the vault was adorned with garlands of plants. To reinforce the sublime effect of the high altar, the partly colored windows were completely replaced by unadorned clear glazing.

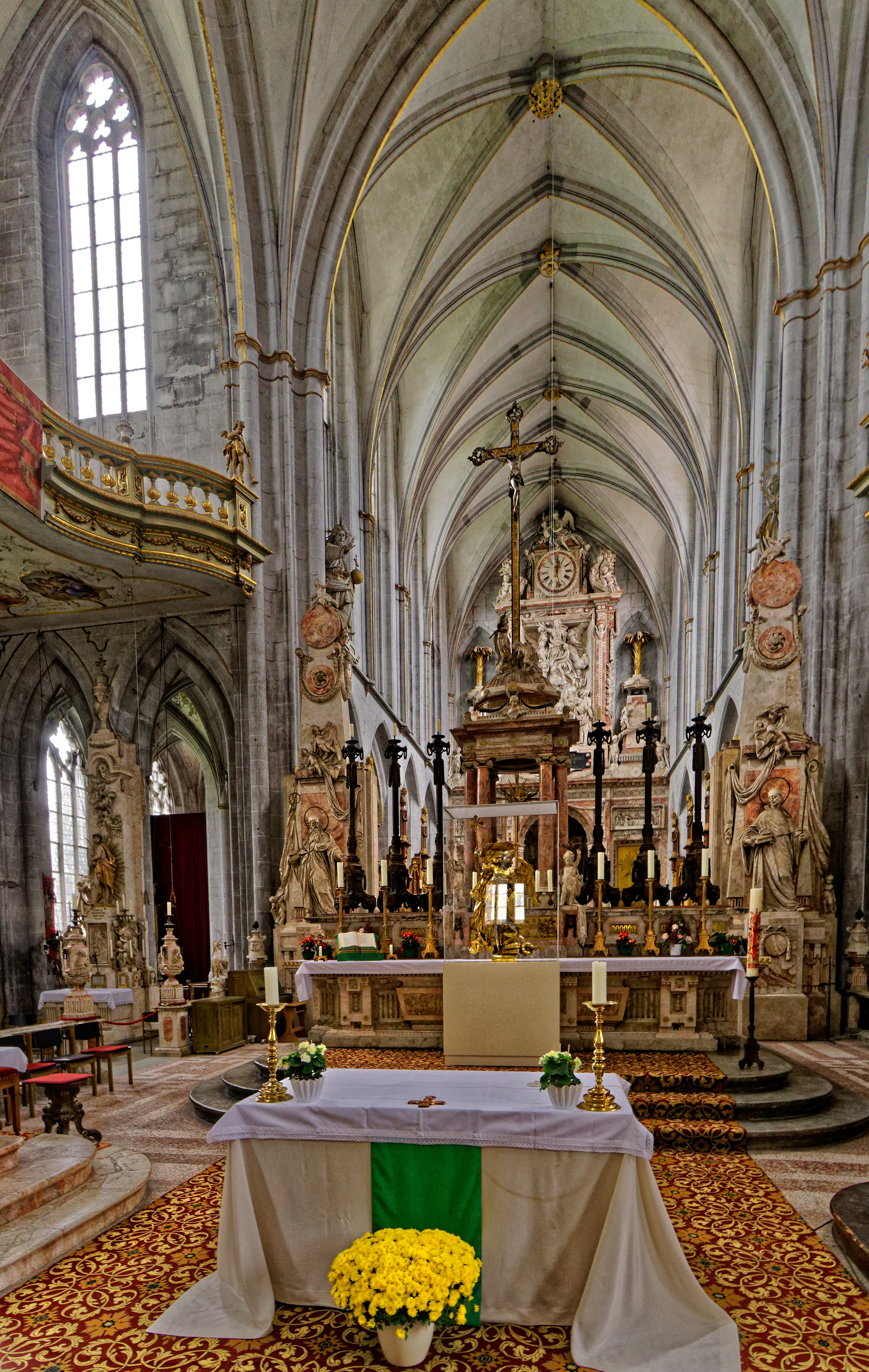
View of the choir in the Minster.

==== Baroque and Rococo ====
The "second baroqueization" began around 1710 following the rebuilding of the monastery complex, which had been destroyed by fire in 1697. It is closely linked to the economic revival of the monastery in the 18th century, which was made possible by tax relief. The representative tasks of the imperial abbey had also grown, as it had to compete with the feudal splendor of the surrounding counties and small principalities. First, however, the organs damaged in the fire had to be repaired and the destroyed altars and church furnishings replaced. The sculptor Franz Joseph Feuchtmayer, who had lived in nearby Mimmenhausen since 1706, produced most of the sculptural decoration, while the painter Franz Carl Stauder created the altar pieces.

Under the abbots Konstantin Miller (1725-1745) and Anselm II Schwab (1748-1778), the rococo style decoration was continued until around 1765. In keeping with the taste of the time, Franz Joseph Spiegler painted the vaulted ceilings of the ambulatory with colorful figurative ceiling frescoes, a few of which are visible again today under the peeling plaster. Numerous altars were redesigned and provided with stucco marble ante-menorals. The decorative and sculptural work was carried out by the elder Feuchtmayer's son Joseph Anton Feuchtmayer. Today, only a few putti and stucco figures as well as the benches of the choir stalls in the minster bear witness to this period of decoration.

==== Classicism ====
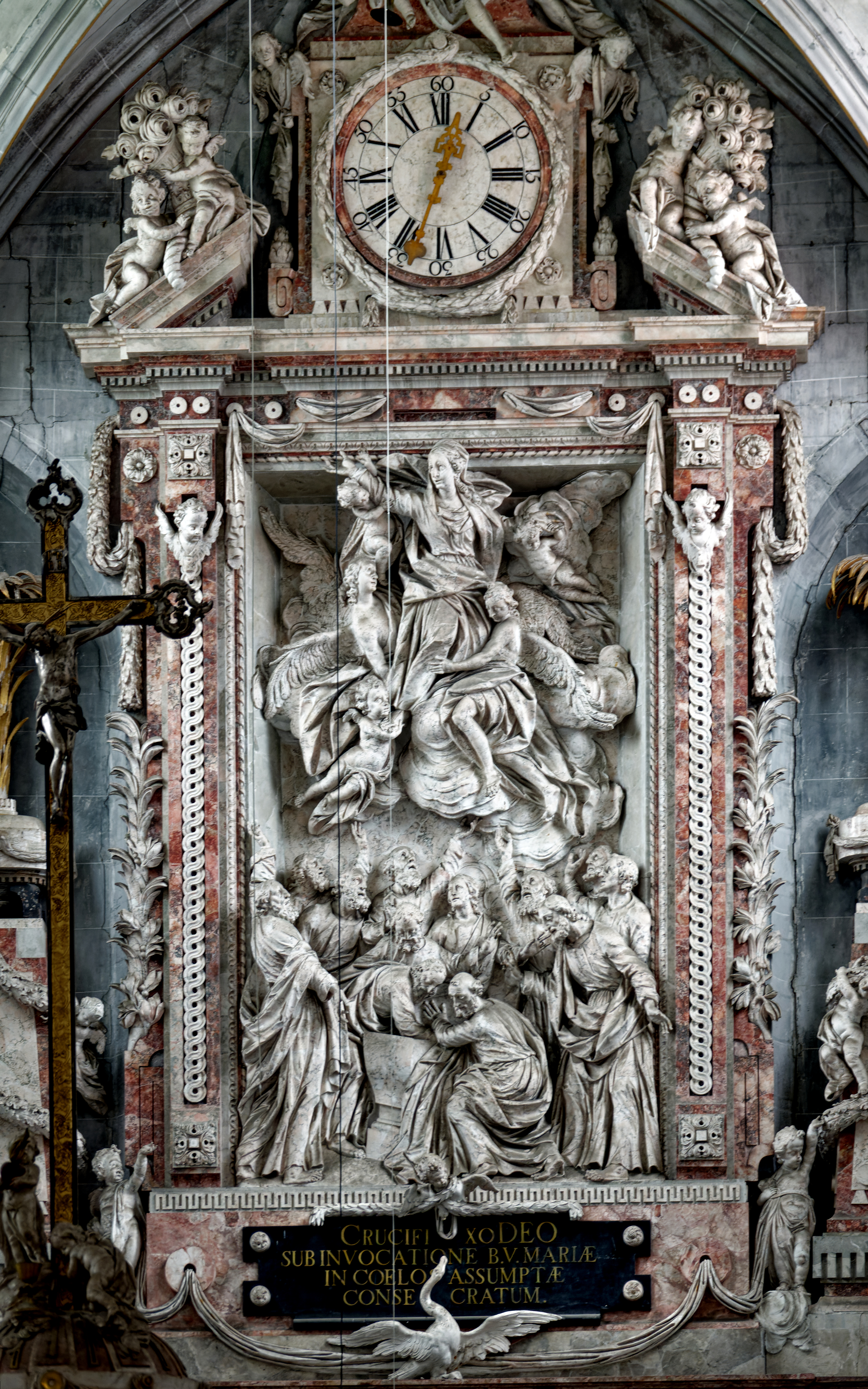
Classicist structure of the Verena Altar

The artistic upheaval that brought Salem back into the role of pioneer among the southern German abbeys was due to Abbot Anselm's trips to Paris in 1765 and 1766. There, Anselm became acquainted with the court architecture of early French classicism and enthusiastically decided on a large-scale redesign of the minster in the French style. The monastery management initially tried to win over the renowned palace and church architect Pierre Michel d'Ixnard for the overall design. However, the planning phase dragged on for several years without a final decision and Feuchtmayer's death in 1770 also deprived him of artistic direction.

It was not until 1772 that the project was fully resumed and successfully completed. The monastery appointed d'Ixnard's pupil Johann Joachim Scholl as building director, who drew up an overall design and oversaw its implementation. Feuchtmayer's successor Johann Georg Dirr and his son-in-law Johann Georg Wieland took over a large part of the sculptural work on altars, monuments and decorative elements. Wieland in particular is credited with the innovative design language of the altars, which chose simple, geometric elements such as pyramids, obelisks, triangular pediments and truncated columns instead of the curved lines of the late Baroque. A huge decorative structure resembling a stage set was installed in front of the east wall. The interior was completely painted in light shades of grey in 1777 to harmonize with the alabaster of the altars; the baroque frescoes were also painted over in the process.

This last comprehensive redesign still characterizes the overall appearance today and is considered unique in southwest German sacred art. It became a model for similar decorations, for example in the Neresheim abbey. The art historian Georg Dehio praised its "pseudo-Dodoric stiff austerity", which fits in well with the "most genuine and truthful monastic style" of Cistercian architecture. While "embellishments" of Gothic churches were common in the 18th century, the interior of Salem Minster was designed in such a way that it opened up a view of the original church architecture. This was entirely in keeping with the new understanding of Gothic art that gained a foothold in France around 1750 and a little later in Germany with Goethe.

=== Altars ===
The current high altar dates back to a design from 1773. Originally the commission was to go to Josef Anton Feuchtmayer, but as he died in 1770, it was planned and executed by his successor Johann Georg Dirr and renewed by Johann Georg Wieland in 1785. The relief shows a depiction of the washing of the feet and the Last Supper. As the altar was to be placed under the crossing, it is decorated with motifs on both sides. This meant that two priests could say mass for the laity on the west side and for the convent on the east side at the same time.

The church has 25 other altars. The 10 largest are in the side chapels between the nave pillars; others are in the ambulatory of the choir. Some of the altar tables are still preserved from the Middle Ages; the structure and the sculptures were designed by Dirr and Wieland in the style of French classicism and made of light-colored alabaster (from the Klettgau region). Some of them are dedicated to religious saints such as Bernard of Clairvaux and Benedict of Nursia, but the regionally venerated Saint Conrad of Constance was also included.

=== East Wall Construction ===
A special niche under the east wall was dedicated to St. Verena, who was already a patron saint of the minster's predecessor church. Dirr designed the Verena altar here as well as two reliefs depicting the Temptation of St. Benedict and the Temptation of St. Bernard. Wieland created two statues of St. John and Mary as well as a large relief depicting the Assumption of Mary, which replaced an older altarpiece with the same motif.

=== Choir Stalls ===
The carved choir stalls were made by Josef Anton Feuchtmayer and his colleagues Franz Anton and Johann Georg Dirr between 1765 and 1775. The seats date from 1766/1767 and are still stylistically rococo, while the back wall and the structure are already neoclassical. Ten gilded relief panels, designed by Wieland around 1785 and placed on the stalls, depict scenes from the Old and New Testaments. On top of them are carved half-columns bearing busts (presumably) of religious saints; it has not yet been possible to identify them clearly.

The old choir stalls were made by Melchior Binder in 1593, the remains of which are now displayed at the west end of the side aisles. What is remarkable about them is the independent combination of late Gothic formal language with antique elements, as was common in the Italian Renaissance.

=== Memorials ===
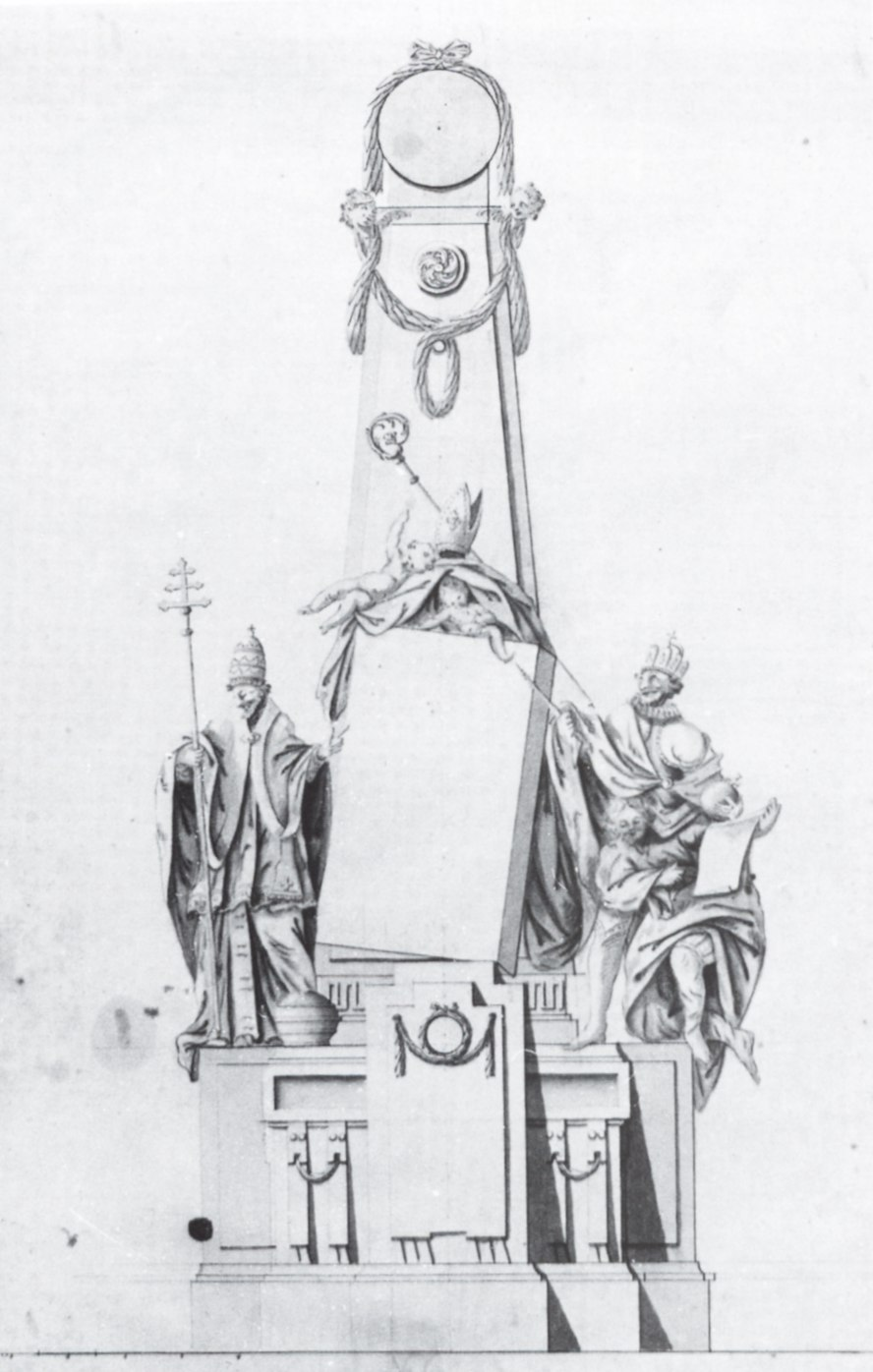
Design by Johann Georg Dirr for the donor monument

Four neoclassical monuments are located in the crossing. They commemorate the most important figures in the history of the monastery and the tradition of the order: the abbot monument lists the Salem abbots and their dates of death alongside skeletons. Two further monuments commemorate Benedict of Nursia, the founder of Western European monasticism, and Bernard of Clairvaux, the saint of the order and great Cistercian missionary.

Finally, the donor monument is dedicated to the founders of the monastery: Baron Guntram von Adelsreute, who donated the building site for the monastery, King Conrad III, who made Salem an imperial abbey, and Pope Benedict XII, who gave the right to a Salem abbot for the first time forgave the use of the pontifical insignia in the coat of arms. (In 1384, this right was permanently granted by Urban VI.) A salt pot and a coat of arms are reminiscent of Eberhard II, the Archbishop of Salzburg, who took the monastery under his protection in 1201 after the founder family died out and subsequently referred to it as “second founder” of the monastery was venerated.

=== Vault Keystones ===
57 gilded reliefs on the keystones of the ribbed vault in the ambulatory date from the earliest construction period around 1298. In the south aisle they show, among other things, animal symbols, including a lion, an eagle and a pelican, which represent the resurrection, ascension and sacrificial death of Christ, a monkey as a symbol of the devil, as well as grimaces, monsters and demons, which as apotropaic figures were supposed to ward off evil. There are also a number of depictions from the life of the Virgin Mary: the flight into Egypt, the birth of Christ and an ostrich as a symbol of the Immaculate Conception.

In the northern area there is the adoration of the Magi, an angel, a praying monk and numerous plant motifs that symbolize the Virgin Mary or, according to other interpretations, Christ. The depiction of the bearded monk is usually interpreted as a (self-)portrait of the master craftsman, who in this case must have been a frater barbatus, a beard-wearing lay brother. The change from figurative to floral motifs is unusual; It is conceivable that the program was changed after the leadership of the Cistercian order strongly condemned the veneration of Mary and the excessive decoration of the churches in 1298.

=== Tabernacle ===
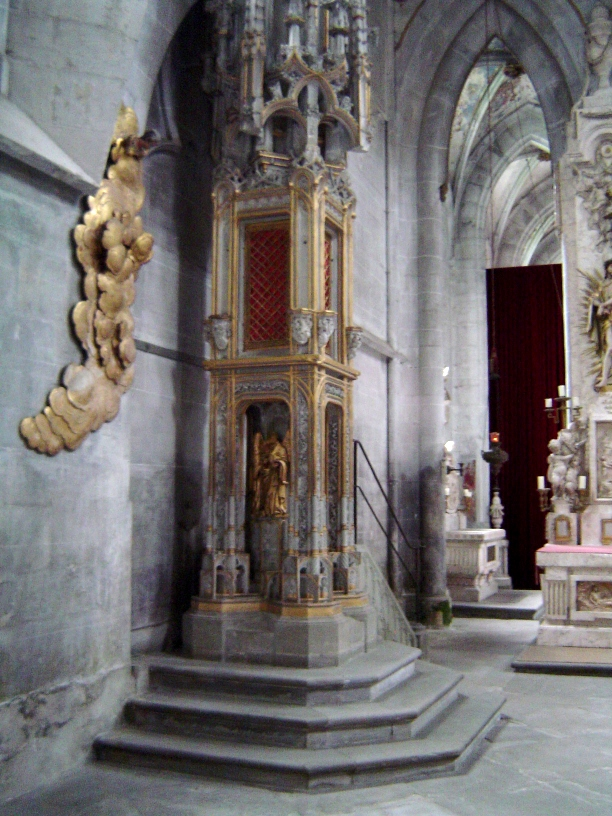
Tabernacle

One of the oldest pieces of equipment is the late Gothic tabernacle from 1494. The stone tower, decorated with Gothic ornaments, is 16 meters high. It originally stood as a monument on the grave of the great abbot John I Stantenat (1471–1494) and today stands on the north wall of the transept, where it is partially hidden by the gallery. The pinnacles are stone carvings from Salem workshops, probably by the nationally effective master craftsman Hans von Safoy. The gilded carved figures were not made for the sacrament shrine, but are probably remains of the high altar made by Michel Erhart. Since it was moved to its current location in 1751, the shrine has been framed by gilded putti and cloud towers from Josef Anton Feuchtmayer's workshop.

=== Apostle Figures ===
The early Baroque period left its mark in the form of fourteen larger-than-life wooden sculptures depicting the twelve apostles, the Virgin Mary and Jesus Christ, decorated in a modest gray with a few decorative elements made of gold leaf. They stand on classicist consoles in front of the windows of the nave. The series of figures was started by Christoph Schenck, completed in 1630 by Zacharias Binder and is one of the most important wood carvings of the early Baroque in the Lake Constance area.

=== Organ ===
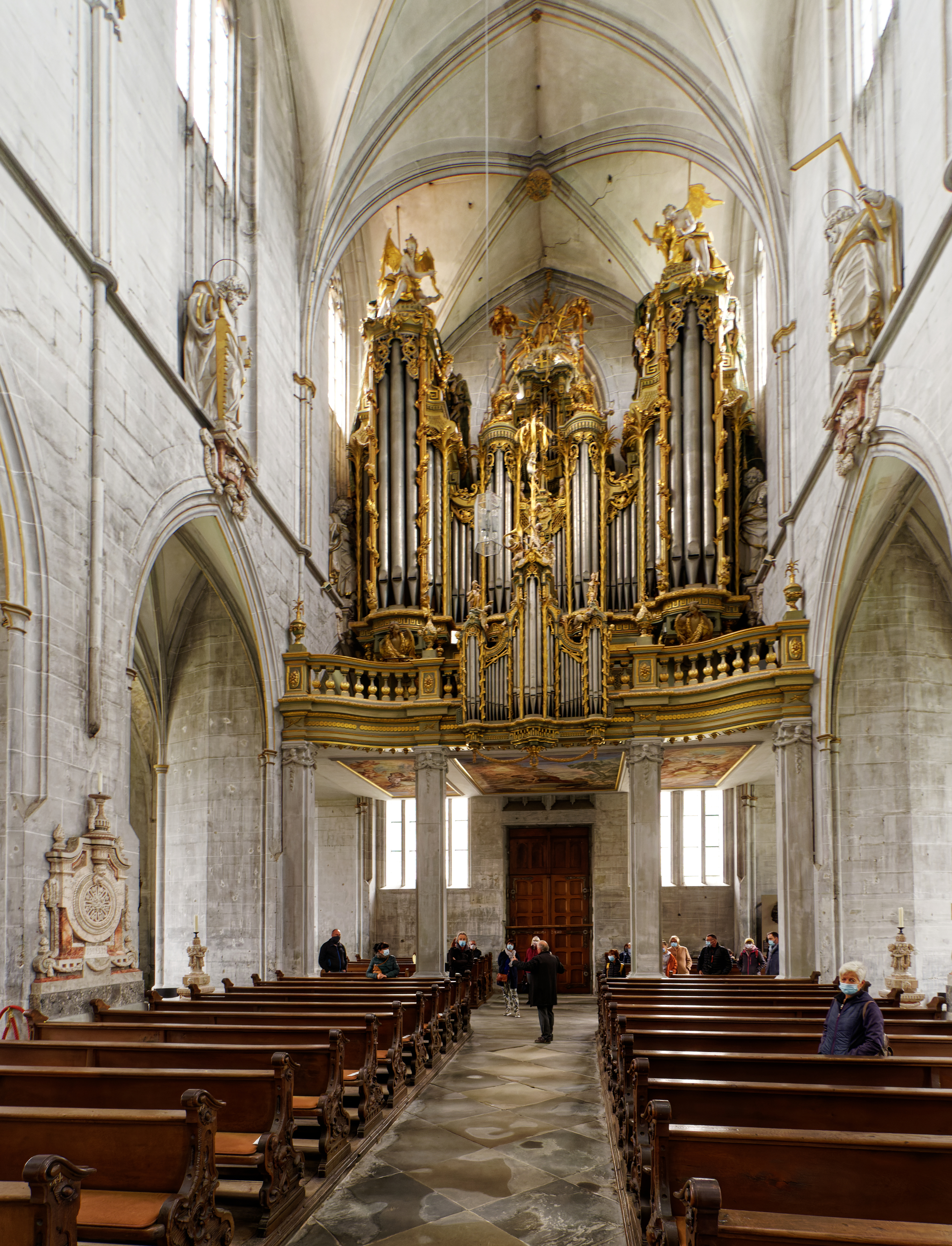
The remaining organ case by J. G. Dirr with the preserved front pipes by K. J. Riepp

In the 15th century, organ music found its way into Cistercian church services. The Salem organ history coincides in all important sections with the building history of the minster, which was consecrated in 1414. A few decades later, Caspar Bruschius reported in his Chronologia that Abbot Georgius Münch had a “quite handsome” organ built in 1441, the largest pipe of which was 28 feet long and four spans in circumference. The second organ was probably a smaller choir organ, which was probably installed as a functional instrument soon after the minster was consecrated. The next abbot ordered a new small organ in 1511 from a priest Bernhardin from the Reichenau abbey.

Around 1600 the two organs were rebuilt and rebuilt. The Apiarium reported in 1708 about the “all-things” organ with the 28-foot-high pipe in the middle of the front field, which therefore tapered on both sides. On the night of 9/10. In March 1697 the abbey was hit by a fire that destroyed the monastery buildings with the exception of the church. Nevertheless, the choir organ had suffered badly and had become unplayable. A lying positive organ was used for the most necessary use and was repaired in 1720 by the archbishop's organ maker Johann Christoph Egedacher from Salzburg. As early as 1714, Abbot Stephan I had chosen this to have four very individual organs built according to his ideas with a total of 117 sounding registers. Only the Liebfrauenorgan on the gallery of the southern transept and the Trinity organ on the west gallery were rebuilt. Both had two manuals, 31 sounding registers and had a 32′ sub bass in the pedal. It was only Abbot Anselm II (term 1746–1778) who took up the four-organ project again and had the church equipped with four new organs. The Swabian “royal organ maker” Karl Joseph Riepp, who was based in Dijon, was commissioned to do this. They were created between 1766 and 1774, comprised a total of 13 keyboards and were composed of 12 works with 7,223 pipes. In their diverse tonal individuality and characteristics - e.g. (the soft and brilliant Liebfrauenorgan, the strong Trinity organ) At least the three big ones were in harmony and yet consciously different. They were coordinated with the extraordinary ringing of the bells in the crossing tower, which was demolished in 1807/1808. The southern gallery of the transept carried the Liebfrauen organ and the northern one the tabernacle organ (for the latter, the water power of a stream diverted underground took over the function of the limestone). The Trinity organ was installed in the magnificent organ case above the west portal, and the Orgue Ordinaire was hidden invisibly behind the choir stalls. The organs were played simultaneously in specially composed orchestral masses.

Due to the consequences of secularization, the two transept organs were sold. The intact Trinity organ above the west gallery, which was still there until 1900, was replaced in 1901 by a pneumatic organ from the Überlingen organ building workshop Wilhelm Schwarz & Sohn. The typical disposition of this period encloses the preserved classicist case from the workshop of Johann Georg Dirr, whereby the prospectus still shows Riepp's handwriting and the pipes of Johann Christoph Egedacher from the previous organ, some of which he used.

=== Epitaphs ===
The gravestones in the minster document that most of the abbots of the monastery were buried here - with the exception of those who left the monastery before their death. Some graves, such as those of the founder Guntram von Adelsreute and the first Salem abbot Frowin, raise doubts: On the one hand, none of the monastery churches were standing at the time of their deaths; On the other hand, it was only in the 18th century that skeletons were exhumed during renovation work and buried under these names.

The Archbishop of Salzburg Eberhard II is also supposedly located here. Hugo I von Werdenberg and the Lords of Bodman, Gremlich and Jungingen, who as donors contributed to the economic situation of the monastery, also rest here; However, the last graves of these noble families date from the early 17th century. Since the early 15th century, deserving non-aristocratic laypeople such as the master builder Michael von Safoy have also been buried in the minster.

== Literature ==
- Oskar Hammer: Das Münster in Salem. Diss., Stuttgart 1917.
- Doris Ast: Die Bauten des Stifts Salem im 17. und 18. Jahrhundert. Tradition und Neuerung in der Kunst einer Zisterzienserabtei. Diss., München 1977.
- Reinhard Schneider (Hrsg.): Salem: 850 Jahre Reichsabtei und Schloss. Stadler, Konstanz 1984. ISBN 3-7977-0104-7.
- Stephan Klingen: Von Birnau nach Salem. Der Übergang vom Rokoko zum Klassizismus in Architektur und Dekoration der südwestdeutschen Sakralkunst. Diss., Bonn 1993, 1999.
- Ulrich Knapp: Ehemalige Zisterzienserreichsabtei Salem. Schnell und Steiner, Regensburg 1998 (3. Aufl.), ISBN 3-7954-1151-3. (Kurzführer)
- Günter Eckstein, Andreas Stiene: Das Salemer Münster. Befunddokumentation und Bestandssicherung an Fassaden und Dachwerk. Arbeitshefte des Landesdenkmalamtes Baden-Württemberg. Bd. 11. Theiss, Stuttgart 2002. ISBN 3-8062-1750-5.
- Richard Strobel: Die Maßwerkfenster der Klosterkirche Salem. Zur Erhaltung und Dokumentation von gotischem Maßwerk. In: Denkmalpflege in Baden-Württemberg, 32. Jg. 2003, Heft 2, S. 160–167. (PDF)
- Ulrich Knapp: Salem: Die Gebäude der ehemaligen Zisterzienserabtei und ihre Ausstattung. Theiss, Stuttgart 2004, ISBN 3-8062-1359-3. (Standardwerk)
- Ulrich Knapp: Salem. Katalog der Pläne und Entwürfe. Theiss, Stuttgart 2004, ISBN 3-8062-1359-3. (Bestandsdokumentation durch das Landesdenkmalamt Baden-Württemberg und Quellensammlung zur Baugeschichte)
- Ulrich Knapp: Eine Musterrestaurierung des 19. Jahrhunderts. Die Instandsetzung der Klosterkirche Salem in den Jahren 1883 bis 1894. In: Denkmalpflege in Baden-Württemberg, 17. Jg. 1988, Heft 3, S. 138–146. (PDF)
- Staatliche Schlösser und Gärten Baden-Württemberg, Klaus Gereon Beuckers unter Mitarbeit von Charlott Hannig (Hrsg.): Die Zisterzienserabtei Salem. Neue Forschungen. Kunstverlag Fink, Lindenberg 2023.

== Links ==
- Homepage Schloss Salem
- Unterrichtsmedien im Internet: Klosterkirche Salem
- Burgundische Romanik – Pontigny – Zisterziensergotik auf gebaut.eu
- Schwarz-Orgel des Münsters Salem auf Orgel-Verzeichnis.de
