= Seck (surname) =

Seck is a surname found both in German and Senegalese populations. Notable people with the surname include:

== Performers ==
- Cheick Tidiane Seck, Malian musician
- Djeneba Seck, Malian singer
- Mansour Seck, Senegalese musician
- Thione Seck, Senegalese musician

=== Politicians ===
- Assane Seck, Senegalese politician
- Awa Marie Coll-Seck, Senegalese politician
- Idrissa Seck, Prime Minister of Senegal, 2002-2004
- Mamadou Seck (politician), Senegal
- Ousmane Seck, Senegalese politician
- Ramatoulaye Seck, Senegalese politician

=== Sportspeople ===
- Abdoul Karim Seck, Senegalese judoka
- Abdoulaye Seck (footballer, born 1988), Senegal
- Abdoulaye Seck (footballer, born 1992)
- Anke von Seck, German canoe racer
- Baba Ndaw Seck, Senegalese footballer
- Babacar Seck, Senegalese basketball player
- Charles-Louis Seck, Senegalese sprinter
- Cheikh Seck, Senegalese footballer
- Demba Seck, Senegalese footballer
- Ibrahima Seck, Senegalese footballer
- Leyti Seck Austrian-Senegalese skier
- Malick Seck, Senegalese judoka
- Mamadou Seck (footballer), Senegal
- Mbaye Seck, Senegalese footballer
- Moustapha Seck, Senegalese footballer
- Saliou Seck, Senegalese sprinter
- Seydou Bocar Seck, Senegalese footballer
- Steve Seck, American judoka

=== Others ===
- Fodé Seck, Senegalese diplomat
- Mame Seck Mbacké, Senegalese writer
- Rudolf Joachim Seck, Nazi war criminal

== See also ==
- Seeck
- Secker
