= Cheikh Niang =

Senegalese diplomat (born 10 July 1957)

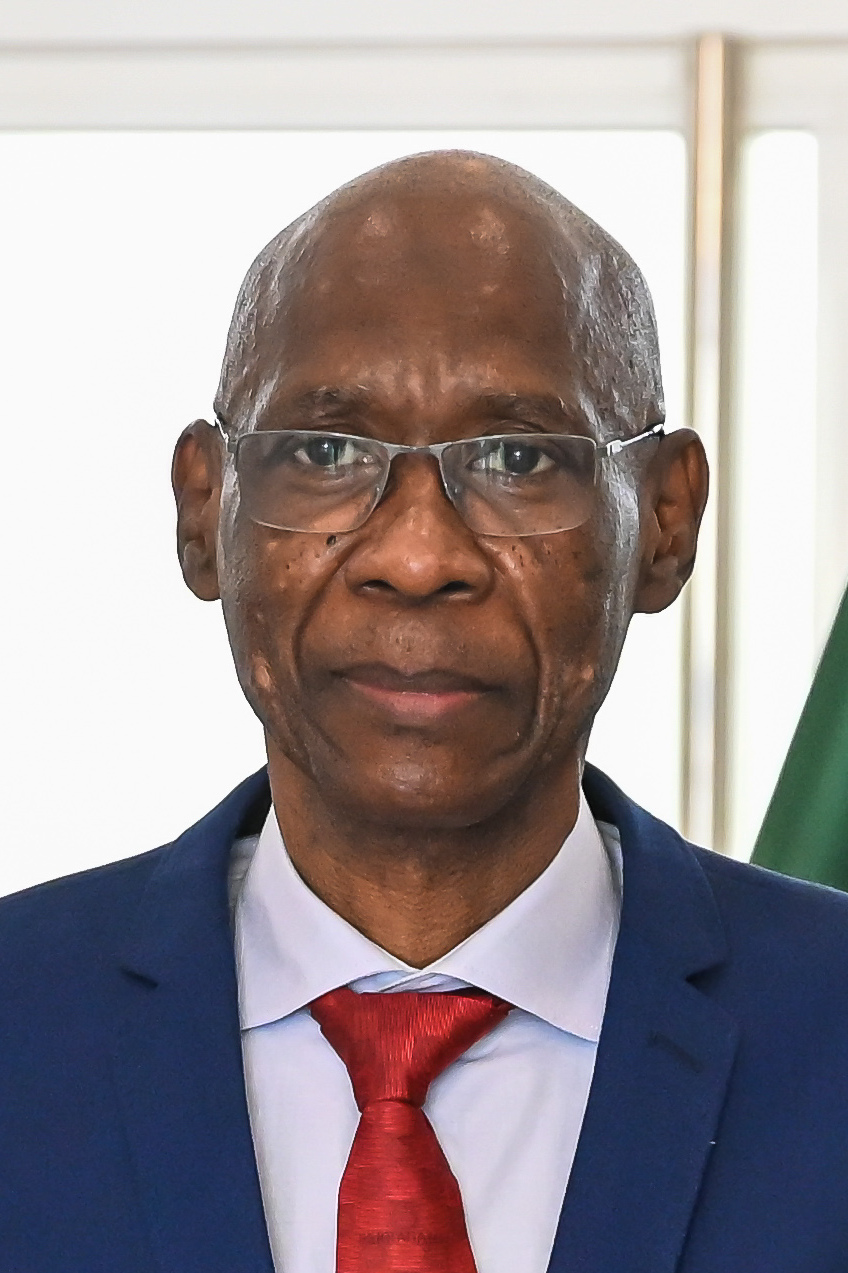
- Niang in 2026

Minister of Foreign Affairs
- Incumbent
- Assumed office 5 September 2025
- President: Bassirou Diomaye Faye
- Prime Minister: Ousmane Sonko
- Preceded by: Yassine Fall

Permanent Representative of Senegal to the United Nations
- In office July 2018 – September 2025
- Preceded by: Fodé Seck

Personal details
- Born: 10 July 1957 (age 69) Senegal
- Occupation: Politician; diplomat

Cheikh Niang (born 10 July 1957) is a Senegalese diplomat and politician who currently serves as Senegalese Minister of Foreign Affairs. Prior to his appointment, he had held several governmental roles which including Permanent Representative of Senegal to the United Nations and several ambassadorial roles.

== Early life and education ==
Niang was born on 10 July 1957 in Thies, Senegal. He studied at the École nationale d’administration et de magistrature (ENA/ENAM) in Dakar. He later furthered his studies to obtain a Master's degree in International Relations and Strategic Studies from Lancaster University, United Kingdom and also a master’s degree / M.Phil in English studies from Cheikh Anta Diop University, Dakar.
