= Minister of the Economy and Finance (Senegal) =

This is a list of individuals who have served as Minister of the Economy and Finance (Ministres de l'Économie et des Finances) of the Republic of Senegal.

== List of ministers ==
- André Peytavin (April 1959 – November 1962)
- Valdiodio Ndiaye (November 1962 – December 1963)
- Daniel Cabou (December 1963 – February 1964)
- Jean Collin (February 1964 – April 1971)
- Babacar Ba (April 1971 – March 1978)
- Ousmane Seck (March 1978 – April 1983)
- Mamoudou Touré (May 1983 – April 1988)
- Serigne Lamine Diop (April 1988 – March 1990)
- Moussa Touré (April 1990 – April 1991)
- Famara Ibrahima Sagna (April 1991 – June 1993)
- Papa Ousmane Sakho (June 1993 – January 1998)
- Mamadou Lamine Loum (January 1998 – July 1998)
- Moustapha Diagne (July 1998 – April 2000)
- Makhtar Diop (April 2000 – May 2001)
- Mamadou Seck (12 May 2001 – 23 May 2001)
- Abdoulaye Diop (May 2001 – 2012)
- Amadou Kane, (2012 – 2013)
- Amadou Ba, (2013 – 2019)
- Abdoulaye Daouda Diallo, (2019 – 2022)
- Mamadou Moustapha Bâ, (2022 – 2024)
- Cheikh Diba, (2024 – )
- Abdourahmane Sarr, (2024 – )

== See also ==
- Politics of Senegal
- Economy of Senegal
