= Seydou Madani Sy =

Senegalese jurist and politician (1933–2026)

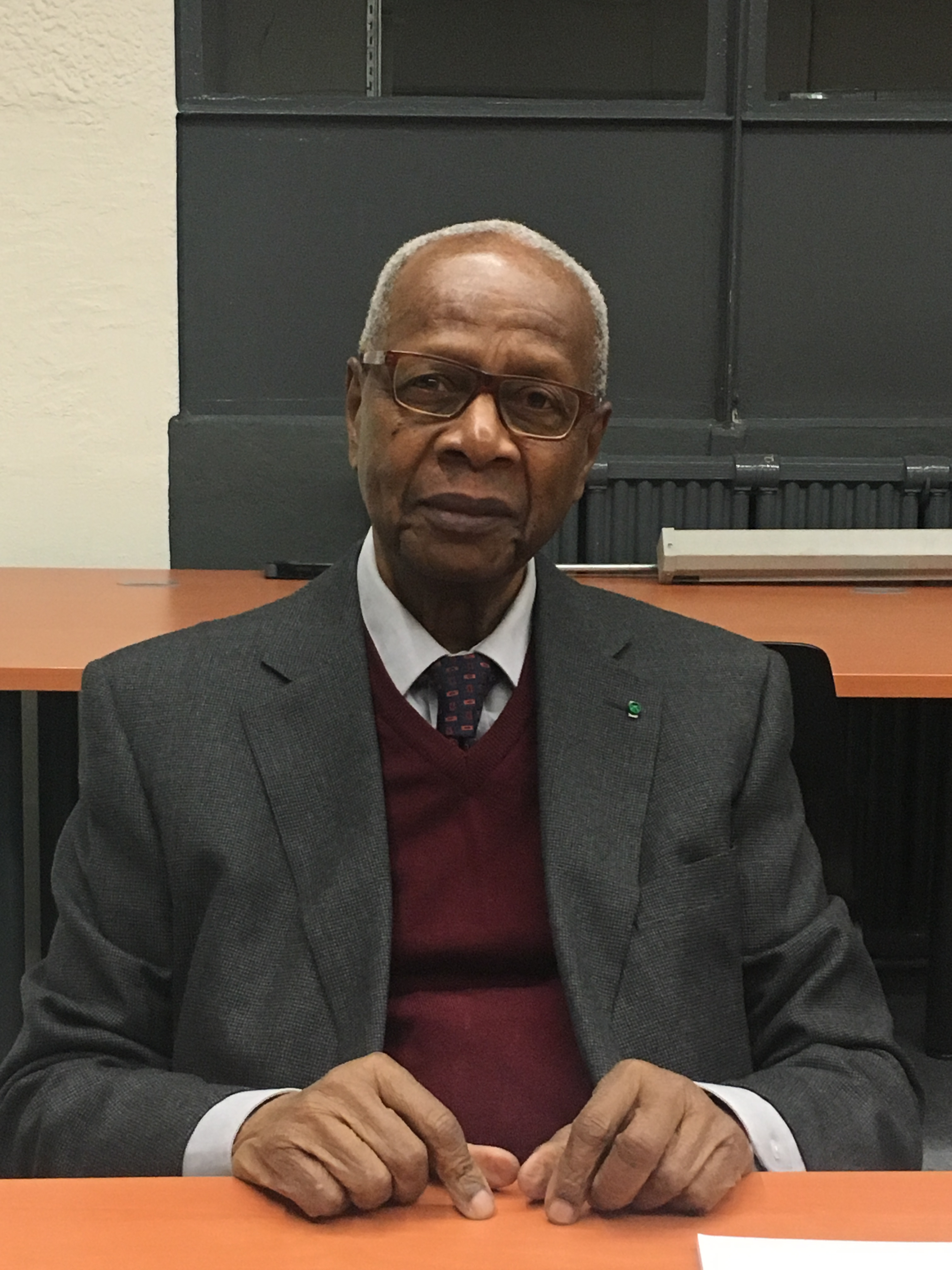
- Sy in 2018

Minister of Justice
- In office 1986–1990
- Preceded by: Abu Bakar Kamara
- Succeeded by: Serigne Lamine Diop

Personal details
- Born: 16 November 1933 Dakar, French Senegal, French West Africa
- Died: 7 January 2026 (aged 92) Dakar, Senegal
- Education: École Nationale des Chartes (DAP); University of Dakar (LLD, (ADP)
- Occupation: Jurist; Civil servant

Seydou Madani Sy (16 November 1933 – 7 January 2026) was a Senegalese jurist and civil servant.

== Life and career ==
Born in Dakar on 16 November 1933, Sy graduated from the École Nationale des Chartes in 1961 before earning a Doctor of Laws from the University of Dakar in 1964, where he also earned an agrégation de droit public in 1966. He then entered academia, serving as president of the University of Dakar from 1971 to 1986. From 1986 to 1989, he was keeper of the seals at the Ministry of Justice, and he was Minister from 1986 to 1990. From 1993 to 1997, he served as ambassador of Senegal to the United Kingdom. Following his retirement, he directed his research towards political science and globalization.

Sy died in Dakar on 7 January 2026, at the age of 92.

== Works ==
- Recherches sur l'exercice du pouvoir politique en Afrique noire : Côte-d'Ivoire, Guinée, Mali (1965)
- Les Régimes politiques sénégalais, de l'indépendance à l'alternance politique : 1960-2008 (2009)
- Le Capitaine Mamadou Racine Sy (1838-1902) : une figure sénégalaise au temps des Tirailleurs (2014)
