= Ministry of Justice (Senegal) =

The Ministry of Justice of Senegal is in charge of the courts of the judiciary (excluding the Supreme court), training of magistrates and other judicial workers, monitoring human rights, avoiding cruel and inhuman punishment and fighting trafficking in persons.

== List of ministers (Post-1960 upon achieving independence) ==
- Gabriel d'Arboussier (1960-1962)
- Andre Guillabert (1962-1963)
- Alioune Badara M'Bengue (1963-1968)
- Abdourahmane Diop (1968-1971)
- Amadou Cledor Sall (1972-1974)
- Alioune Badara M'Bengue (1974-1983)
- Doudou N'Doye (1983-1985)
- Abu Bakar Kamara (1984-1985)
- Seydou Madani Sy (1986-1990)
- Serigne Lamine Diop (1990-1993)
- Jacques Baudin (1993-1998)
- Serigne Diop (1998-2000)
- Mame Madior Boye (2000-2002) [1st female]
- Serigne Diop (2002-2006)
- Chiekh Tidiane Sy (2007-2009)
- Madicke Niang (2009-2011)
- Chiekh Tidiane Sy (2011-2012)
- Aminata Touré (2012-2013)
- Sidiki Kaba (2013-2017)
- Ismaila Madior Fall (2017–present)

== See also ==
- Justice ministry
- Politics of Senegal
