= Babacar Ba =

Senegalese politician

Babacar Ba (June 14, 1930 – December 13, 2006) was a Senegalese politician from Kaolack. He served as Minister of Finance and Economy from 1971 to 1978, when Ousmane Seck took office. Ba was named Foreign Minister of Senegal. He stepped down as from the foreign ministry later that same year, and was succeeded by Moustapha Niasse.
