= United States and the International Monetary Fund =

The United States was a founding member of the International Monetary Fund (IMF) and has played a dominant role in the institution since its inception. Having hosted the Bretton Woods Conference in 1944, the U.S. delegation was instrumental in designing the IMF's core structure and principles. The U.S. remains the largest financial contributor to the Fund and, consequently, wields significant influence over its governance and policy direction.

== Founding and the Bretton Woods System ==
The conceptual framework for the IMF was largely developed in the United States. In July 1944, delegates from 44 allied nations convened at the Mount Washington Hotel in Bretton Woods, New Hampshire, to design a new post-war international monetary system. The American delegation, led by Harry Dexter White of the U.S. Treasury Department, was a central force in the negotiations, working alongside the British delegation led by John Maynard Keynes.

White's "White Plan" formed the basis for the IMF's structure, and he was a principal author of the Joint Statement by Experts, which evolved into the IMF's Articles of Agreement. Following the conference, White was confirmed by the U.S. Senate in 1946 as the first American Executive Director of the Fund.

The resulting Bretton Woods system established the U.S. dollar as the cornerstone of the global economy. All other major currencies were pegged to the dollar at fixed exchange rates, while the dollar itself was convertible to gold at a rate of $35 per ounce. This system made the IMF, tasked with overseeing this fixed-rate regime and providing short-term financing to members, a central pillar of the post-war economic order.

== The Nixon Shock and the end of Bretton Woods ==
The Bretton Woods system relied on the strength and stability of the U.S. economy. However, by the 1950s and 1960s, the United States began running persistent balance-of-payments deficits, leading to a steady drain on its massive gold reserves. From 1958 to 1962, the U.S. lost an average of $1.4 billion in gold annually. Compounding this, inflation in the U.S. accelerated after 1965, tripling to around 6 percent and undermining confidence in the dollar's fixed value.

Faced with mounting pressure, President Richard Nixon unilaterally suspended the dollar's convertibility into gold on August 15, 1971, an event known as the Nixon Shock. This move effectively ended the Bretton Woods system of fixed exchange rates and forced the IMF to reinvent its primary role, shifting its focus to managing floating exchange rates and providing policy advice and financial support during debt crises.

== Contemporary role and influence ==
The United States remains the IMF's most powerful member state. It is the largest financial contributor, with a quota of approximately 83 billion SDRs (around $117 billion as of 2022) and has committed an additional $44 billion in supplemental funds.

This financial preeminence translates into decisive voting power. The U.S. holds roughly 17% of the total votes in the IMF's governing boards. Since major decisions require an 85% supermajority, the U.S. effectively holds a unilateral veto over any significant changes to the Fund's structure, policies, or quota system. Beyond formal voting power, the U.S. maintains close relations with the IMF's management and exerts considerable informal influence over its strategic agenda.

== Scholarly analysis of U.S. influence ==
Academic studies have extensively examined the nature of American influence on IMF lending decisions. A prominent finding is that U.S. political allies often receive more favorable treatment. A study from the University of Chicago concluded that countries with closer ties to the U.S. faced fewer conditions on their IMF loans. Similarly, research by Strom Thacker found that a country's political alignment with the U.S., measured by voting patterns in the UN, significantly increased its likelihood of receiving an IMF loan.

However, other scholarship suggests that U.S. influence is not the only factor. A 2003 study argued that changes in IMF conditionality were more directly correlated with the interests of private international financiers than with the geopolitical objectives of the U.S. government.

== See also ==
- Bretton Woods system
- World Bank
- Petrodollar
- International organization membership of the United States
- United States and the United Nations
