= Kwakwa =

Kwakwa may refer to:

== People ==
- Enock Kwakwa (born 1994), Ghanaian football player
- Eric Kwakwa (born 1994), Ghanaian football player
- Victoria Kwakwa, Ghanaian economist

== Places ==
- Kwakwa, Cameroon
- QwaQwa, South Africa
