= Mamadou Seck =

Mamadou Seck may refer to:

- Mamadou Seck (politician), President of the National Assembly of Senegal
- Mamadou Seck (footballer)
