= International Finance Corporation =

World Bank Group member financial institution

- IFC logo

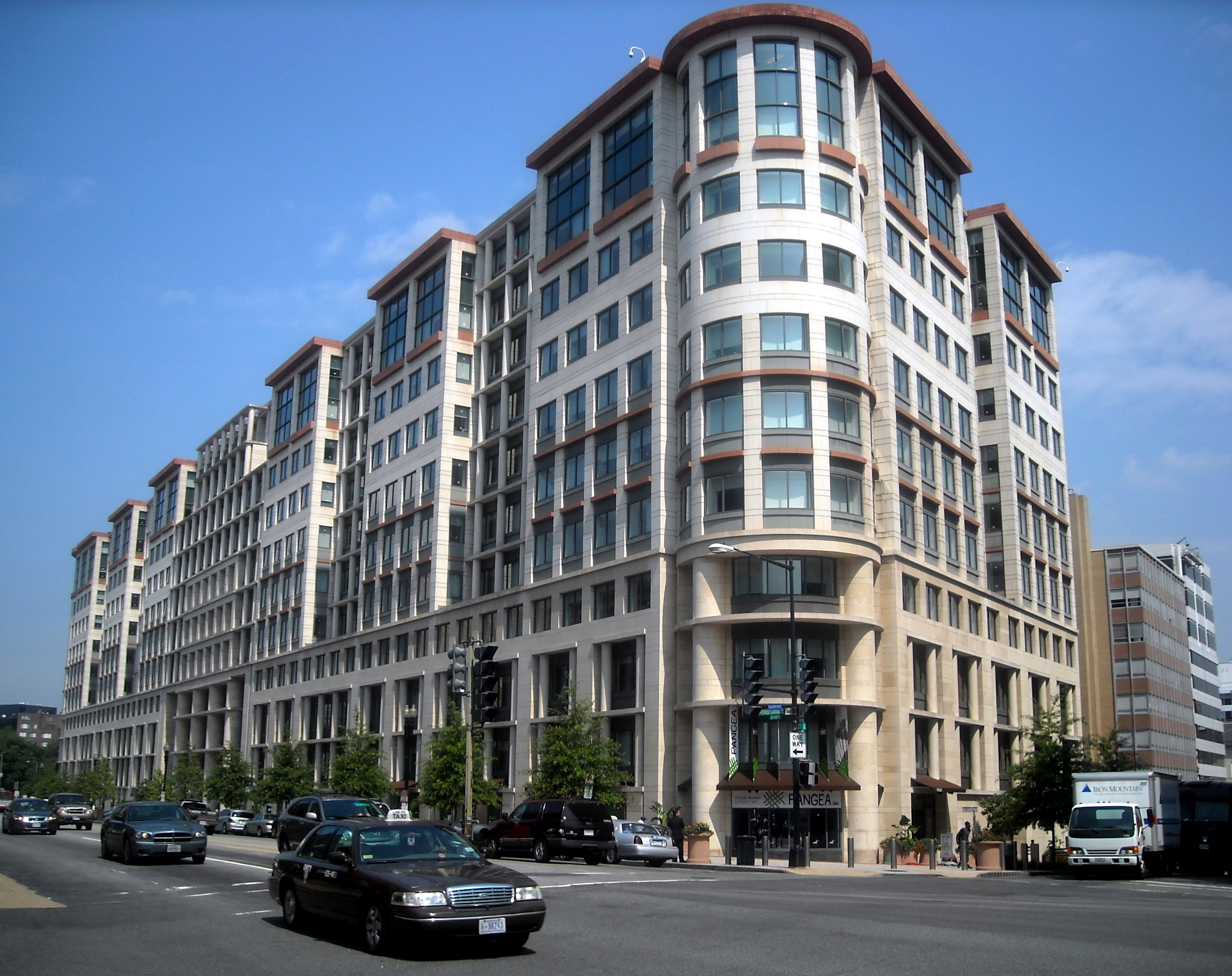
- IFC headquarters building, designed by architect Michael Graves
- Formation: July 20, 1956; 70 years ago
- Type: Development finance institution
- Legal status: Treaty
- Purpose: Private sector development, Poverty reduction
- Headquarters: Washington, D.C., United States
- Members: 186 countries
- Managing Director: Makhtar Diop
- Parent organization: World Bank Group
- Website: ifc.org

The International Finance Corporation (IFC) is an international financial institution that offers investment, advisory, and asset management services to encourage private sector development in developing countries. It is a member of the World Bank Group and is headquartered in Washington, D.C.

IFC is the largest global development institution focused exclusively on the private sector in emerging markets and developing economies. As of 2025 it operates in more than 100 countries, employs over 3,400 staff — approximately half stationed in field offices — and has 186 member countries. In fiscal year 2025 (ended June 30, 2025), IFC committed a record $71.7 billion in total investment across its own-account and mobilized capital, making it one of the largest providers of development finance globally. IFC holds AAA/Aaa long-term credit ratings from Moody's, S&P Global, and Fitch, with stable outlooks.

IFC was established in 1956 as a sister institution to the International Bank for Reconstruction and Development (IBRD) to channel private capital into productive investment in the developing world. Unlike the World Bank, which lends to governments, IFC finances private enterprises without requiring government guarantees. Its stated mission is to promote economic development in emerging markets by supporting private sector growth, generating employment, and mobilizing private investment. The private sector creates nine out of ten jobs in developing economies — a figure IFC uses as the cornerstone of its development rationale. Managing Director Makhtar Diop, who assumed the role on March 1, 2021, is the first African to lead the institution.

IFC has faced criticism from civil society, journalists, and independent evaluators over financing — particularly through financial intermediaries — linked to environmental damage, forced displacement, and human rights abuses. In Jam v. International Finance Corporation (2019), the US Supreme Court held that international organizations can be sued in US courts for commercial activities that cause harm.

== History ==
=== Origins and establishment (1944–1956) ===
The idea for a World Bank affiliate focused on private sector investment dates to the 1944 Bretton Woods Conference, which created the International Monetary Fund and the International Bank for Reconstruction and Development, but did not address the role of private capital in development finance. Robert L. Garner joined the World Bank in 1947 and became the principal advocate for a new institution that would invest in private enterprises in developing countries without sovereign guarantees — a concept the IBRD's articles prevented it from pursuing directly. In 1952, Garner submitted a memorandum to World Bank President Eugene Black proposing the creation of a separate affiliate; Black pursued the idea through diplomatic and legislative channels.

Nelson Rockefeller, chairman of the United States International Development Advisory Board, called for a program for economic development which involved private sector. The board submitted a report to President Truman on March 7, 1951.

In 1954, the U.N. General Assembly passed a resolution (A/RES/822(IX)) urging the World Bank to study the concept of a private-investment affiliate. IFC's Articles of Agreement came into force on July 20, 1956, with an initial authorized capital of $100 million (approximately $1.2 billion in 2025 dollars). Time magazine reported at IFC's founding that Garner's institution started with $78.4 million in paid-in subscriptions. Garner became IFC's first president. IFC's original charter prohibited equity investments. In 1957, IFC made its first investment: a $2 million loan to a Brazilian affiliate of Siemens AG. IFC was structured as a legally separate institution with its own Articles of Agreement, share capital, management, and staff. The World Bank Group President serves simultaneously as IFC President under the Articles of Agreement, but IFC is independently managed on a day-to-day basis by a managing director.

=== Early decades and expansion (1956–2000s) ===
In its first five years, IFC was restricted to making loans. In 1959, IFC initiated its first loan syndication, mobilizing $2 million from a group of commercial banks for an investment in a Brazilian pulp and paper company — a model that would grow into one of the largest syndication programs among development finance institutions. The equity restriction was lifted in 1961, when the Articles of Agreement were amended to permit investments in capital stock. IFC made its first equity investment in 1962, in FEMSA, a Spanish firm. Under successive leaders — the title was changed from president to executive vice president in 1961 when the role became subordinate to the World Bank president — IFC broadened its sector coverage into financial markets, capital-market development, and tourism by the 1970s.

The 1980s brought significant expansion as the debt crisis that swept Latin America and Africa created hardship and opportunity: as commercial bank lending to developing countries collapsed, IFC stepped in as one of the few sources of long-term capital. IFC extended its product range to include partial credit guarantees, risk management instruments, and local currency financing. Its last capital increase before 2020 occurred in 1992.

One of IFC's consequential innovations of the 1980s was the creation of the Emerging Markets Growth Fund (EMGF) in 1986, one of the first private equity funds dedicated to developing-country investments, which helped demonstrate that private equity in emerging markets could generate competitive returns.

The collapse of the Soviet Union opened new markets in the early 1990s. IFC moved into Central and Eastern Europe, the former Soviet republics, and China, providing some of the earliest foreign investment in economies transitioning from central planning to market systems. The 1997–98 Asian financial crisis and Russian debt default tested IFC's balance sheet and forced significant write-downs on the equity portfolio.

Peter Woicke served as Executive Vice President from January 1999 to January 2005, overseeing a period of institutional transformation in which IFC prioritized the poorest and most difficult markets, including fragile and conflict-affected states.

=== Expansion and reform (2000s–2010s) ===
Annual long-term own-account commitments grew from roughly $3–4 billion in the early 2000s to over $10 billion by 2010. IFC broadened its investment product range, establishing the Global Trade Finance Program (GTFP) in 2005 to support trade in the riskiest markets and expanding its local currency lending capabilities. IFC also took an early and influential role in financial sector development, becoming one of the largest single investors in financial institutions across emerging markets.

IFC issued its first Performance Standards in 2006 — eight standards governing environmental and social risk management that its investment clients were required to implement. These quickly became influential far beyond IFC itself, forming the basis for the Equator Principles' 2006 revision and making IFC's standards the effective global benchmark for responsible project finance.

The 2008 global financial crisis tested IFC's capacity for counter-cyclical lending. IFC deployed capital more rapidly than in prior crises and introduced new facilities to support distressed financial institutions. The IFC Asset Management Company (AMC) was established in 2009 to attract third-party institutional capital — sovereign wealth funds, pension funds, and insurance companies — to invest alongside IFC in its own portfolio.

In 2012, IFC completed a comprehensive revision of its Sustainability Framework and Performance Standards, effective January 1, 2012. The updated standards introduced formal recognition of Free, Prior and Informed Consent (FPIC) for indigenous peoples in defined circumstances and extended supply chain due diligence requirements to cover child and forced labor and high-risk commodities.

A 2019 US Supreme Court ruling in Jam v. IFC changed IFC's legal exposure, establishing that international organizations can face suit in US federal courts for commercial activities causing harm.

=== IFC 3.0 and recent developments (2016–present) ===
In December 2016, IFC's Board endorsed a new strategic framework known as IFC 3.0, formalized through 2017–2018. The strategy shifted IFC's approach from primarily identifying and financing good private-sector investment opportunities to actively creating markets — using upstream advisory work, blended finance, and policy dialogue with governments to generate investment where private capital would not otherwise flow. The accompanying "Cascade" approach established a sequencing principle: commercial private finance should be used wherever possible before blended or public finance is deployed.

The IFC 3.0 strategy was accompanied in April 2018 by the first capital increase in 26 years: the Development Committee endorsed a $13 billion capital package for the World Bank Group, of which $5.5 billion was paid-in capital for IFC and $7.5 billion for IBRD. The US Congress authorized its share in March 2020 through the CARES Act. Under the capital increase package (CIP), IFC committed to doubling its annual investment program to $48 billion by 2030, tripling annual investments in the poorest and fragile countries, and raising the share of IDA-eligible and fragile/conflict-affected country commitments to 40% of the portfolio by FY2030.

In March 2020, IFC committed $8 billion in fast-track financing as part of a $14 billion World Bank Group package to help developing countries respond to the COVID-19 pandemic, targeting small and medium enterprises through four facilities covering real-sector crisis response, trade finance, working capital solutions, and the Global Trade Liquidity Program. IFC's total COVID-related commitments reached approximately $10.8 billion in FY2021. The financial impact of the pandemic was reflected in IFC's FY2020 net loss of $1.67 billion, followed by a $4.2 billion gain in FY2021 as markets rebounded.

When Russia invaded Ukraine in February 2022, IFC committed $12 billion of the World Bank Group's $30 billion food security response package through August 2023, and launched the Economic Resilience Action (ERA) program for Ukraine in December 2022. By February 2026, ERA had committed $2.8 billion including over $1 billion mobilized from donor partners, covering SME finance, agribusiness, critical imports and exports, energy security, and telecommunications infrastructure.

Makhtar Diop was appointed Managing Director on March 1, 2021, and oversaw a period of record investment activity. Total commitments grew from $31.5 billion in FY2021 to $71.7 billion in FY2025, a record reported by Reuters as a 28% increase over the previous year's prior record of $56 billion. World Bank Group President Ajay Banga, who assumed the presidency in June 2023, launched the Private Sector Investment Lab (PSIL) and championed an ambitious mobilization agenda, including a World Bank Group Guarantee Platform launched in July 2024 that consolidated more than 20 guarantee products with a goal of tripling guarantee issuances to $20 billion per year by 2030.

In October 2025, World Bank Group President Banga announced a sweeping organizational restructuring effective January 2026, merging IFC's knowledge and research teams with those of IBRD and IDA into five unified verticals — People, Prosperity, Planet, Infrastructure, and Digital — and merging treasury operations. The Center for Global Development and Bretton Woods Project raised concerns about potential conflicts of interest when IFC's commercial arm is integrated with the World Bank Group's knowledge and research production.

=== Originate-to-distribute strategy ===
Under a ten-year strategic vision announced at the October 2025 Annual Meetings, IFC is repositioning toward an "originate-to-distribute" model — packaging loans as rated securities sold to institutional investors rather than holding them to maturity — to free balance sheet capacity for new investments. World Bank Group President Banga described the strategy: "This is step one in an originate-to-distribute strategy that holds significant potential to attract private capital at scale. It also frees up our balance sheet so we can support more countries and private sector players."

== Governance and organization ==
=== Member countries and shareholding ===
As of 2026, IFC has 186 member countries. Membership is open only to countries that are members of the International Bank for Reconstruction and Development. Each member country holds shares in IFC; voting power is weighted by share capital plus basic votes distributed equally among all members. The United States is the largest single shareholder, with 17.11% of voting power — not the approximate 20% it held before the 2018 capital increase diluted its share from ~21% to ~18.1% of capital stock. The US holds effective veto power over major decisions requiring an 85% supermajority — including capital increases and amendments to the Articles of Agreement — since its ~17% share exceeds the 15% blocking threshold.

The $5.5 billion capital increase approved in April 2018 and effective in 2020 more than tripled IFC's paid-in capital stock, which stood at $24.0 billion at June 30, 2025. The US did not participate in the capital increase by prior agreement, resulting in dilution of its capital stock share while retaining its veto. OECD member countries collectively held 65.79% of IFC's total voting power as of June 30, 2025. A regular five-year shareholding review was underway in 2025, examining potential realignment of voting power toward developing and transition countries.

Largest shareholders by voting power (As of January 2026)
Rank	Country	No. of votes	% of total voting power	Notes
1	United States	4,348,895	17.11%	Largest shareholder; holds effective veto power
2	Japan	1,808,059	7.08%	Second largest
3	Germany	1,269,308	4.97%	
4	France	1,192,055	4.67%	Tied with United Kingdom
5	United Kingdom	1,192,055	4.67%	Tied with France
6	India	1,015,214	3.98%	Largest emerging market shareholder
7	Canada	803,754	3.15%	Tied with Italy
8	Italy	803,754	3.15%	Tied with Canada
9	Russian Federation	791,828	3.10%	
10	China	747,122	2.93%	
11	Saudi Arabia	591,422	2.32%	
12	Netherlands	557,001	2.18%	
13	Belgium	502,964	1.97%	
14	Brazil	484,247	1.90%	Largest Latin American shareholder
15	Australia	470,851	1.84%	

Sources: IFC Country Voting Table (January 9, 2026); IFC Annual Information Statement FY25

=== Board of Governors ===
Each of the 186 member countries appoints one Governor and one alternate Governor to the Board of Governors, typically represented by Finance Ministers or their equivalents. The Board of Governors meets annually at the World Bank Group's Annual Meetings, held in Washington, D.C. in most years and at rotating venues every third year. It holds corporate powers but delegates most operating authority to the board of directors.

=== Board of Directors ===
The Board of Directors consists of 25 Executive Directors who meet regularly at World Bank Group headquarters in Washington, D.C. The Board reviews and approves individual investments above certain thresholds, sets strategy, and provides oversight. Voting is weighted by the share capital each director represents. Each director represents a constituency of member countries, with the exception of the United States, Japan, Germany, France, and the United Kingdom, which each appoint a single executive director.

Each member's voting power consists of basic votes and share votes. Basic votes are distributed equally among all members and represent 5.55% of the aggregate voting power. Share votes are allocated at one vote per share of capital stock held.

=== Relationship to the World Bank Group ===
IFC is a legally separate institution from the International Bank for Reconstruction and Development, International Development Association, and Multilateral Investment Guarantee Agency, but shares the World Bank Group president as its nominal corporate president under the Articles of Agreement. IFC operates alongside the World Bank Group's public-sector arms, with a division of labor: IBRD and IDA lend to governments; IFC invests in private enterprises; MIGA provides political risk guarantees. IFC works closely with the World Bank through joint Country Private Sector Diagnostics, the Cascade approach, and upstream project preparation that can result in regulatory reforms enabling IFC investments. In October 2025, World Bank Group President Banga announced the integration of IFC's knowledge and research teams into unified World Bank Group verticals.

=== Managing Director ===
IFC's day-to-day operations are led by a managing director (officially the managing director and Executive Vice President). The World Bank Group President formally holds the title of IFC President under the Articles of Agreement, but management authority rests with the managing director.

The current managing director is Makhtar Diop, appointed March 1, 2021, and the first African to hold this position. Under his leadership, IFC hit a record $56 billion in total investments in FY2024, rising to $71.7 billion in FY2025. The full management team as of 2025–2026 comprises:

Makhtar Diop — Managing Director. Former World Bank Vice President for Infrastructure and Vice President for Africa. Minister of Economy and Finance of Senegal in the late 1980s. Educated at the Universities of Warwick and Nottingham.

Elena Bourganskaia — Vice President, Strategy and Operations Support. Oversees corporate strategy, E&S policy, human resources, and communications. Joined IFC in 1998 as a Health Specialist; MD, Semashko Moscow Medical School; MPA, New York University.

Federico Galizia — Vice President, Risk and Finance. Former Chief Risk Officer, Inter-American Development Bank; former IMF Deputy Division Chief, Monetary and Capital Markets. PhD in economics, Yale University.

John Gandolfo — Vice President and Chief Financial Officer. Leads IFC's financial strategy, debt and equity capital mobilization, blended finance, and global investor relations. Former Director and Chief Investment Officer, World Bank Pension and Endowments Department ($27 billion). Over 30 years at World Bank Group. BA, University of Pennsylvania; MBA, George Washington University.

Mohamed Gouled — Vice President, Products & Clients. Responsible for IFC's private equity and venture capital business, trade and supply chain finance, and structured products. Joined IFC in 1999.

Alfonso García Mora — Regional Vice President, Europe, Latin America and the Caribbean. Leads IFC engagement in Ukraine response and post-COVID-19 recovery. Former IFC Regional VP for Asia and the Pacific. PhD in Financial Economics, Universidad Autónoma de Madrid.

Mary-Jean Moyo — Chief of Staff. Former IFC Regional Industry Director for Manufacturing, Agribusiness and Services, Middle East and Africa. Master's in Banking and Finance, University of Wales; BA in Economic History, University of Zimbabwe.

Ramit Nagpal — Vice President and General Counsel, Legal, Institutional Risk and Governance. Former Managing Director, Deputy General Counsel, European Bank for Reconstruction and Development; former Deputy General Counsel, Asian Development Bank. LLM, Harvard Law School.

Sarvesh Suri — Regional Vice President, Asia and the Pacific. Former Director for Climate, Energy, Extractives, Capital, and Financial Markets Operations at MIGA, managing 250 projects with $34 billion in guarantees. Post-graduate diploma, IIM Ahmedabad.

Ethiopis Tafara — Regional Vice President, Africa. Oversees IFC's Africa portfolio of $20 billion committed across 800+ staff. Former VP and General Counsel, IFC; former Director of the Office of International Affairs, US Securities and Exchange Commission. JD, Georgetown University Law Center; AB, Princeton University.

IFC Managing Directors
Name	Country	Tenure
Robert L. Garner	United States	1956–1961
Martin M. Rosen	United States	1961–1984
Sir William S. Ryrie	United Kingdom	1984–1994
Jannik Lindbaek	Norway	1994–1999
Peter Woicke	Germany	1999–2005
Lars H. Thunell	Sweden	2006–2012
Jin-Yong Cai	China	2012–2016
Philippe Le Houérou	France	2016–2021
Makhtar Diop	Senegal	2021–present

Source: IFC Annual Report 2024

== Operations and finances ==
=== Investment portfolio ===
Total investment commitments (own account plus mobilized) have grown substantially in recent years, setting successive annual records since FY2022:

IFC total investment commitments (USD billions)
Fiscal Year	Own-Account LTF	Core Mobilization	Short-Term Finance (Own Account)	Total
FY2021	$12.5B	$10.8B	$8.2B	$31.5B
FY2022	$12.6B	$11.4B	$9.7B	$32.8B
FY2023	$16.7B	$16.0B	$11.0B	$43.7B
FY2024	$21.5B	$24.4B	$10.2B	$56.1B
FY2025	$18.2B	$43.4B	$10.1B	$71.7B

Sources: World Bank Group Annual Report; IFC FY2025 MD&A

The FY2025 total of $71.7 billion was driven primarily by a near-doubling of core mobilization from $24.4 billion to $43.4 billion. Within FY2025 core mobilization, the largest components were syndicated loans ($14.3 billion), anchor investments ($6.9 billion), advisory and upstream mobilization ($6.8 billion), trade finance ($3.8 billion), third-party managed funds ($3.4 billion), and guarantees ($2.6 billion).

In FY2025, Africa was IFC's largest region for own-account long-term commitments at $4.8 billion (26.3%), followed by Latin America and the Caribbean at $4.3 billion (23.6%), South Asia at $2.5 billion (14.0%), East Asia and the Pacific at $2.4 billion (13.3%), and Europe at $2.3 billion (12.5%). Reuters reported in November 2025 that Africa had exceeded $15 billion in IFC commitments in the prior year, with IFC expanding local-currency lending and direct equity investments across the continent. IFC partnered with Standard Bank and Rand Merchant Bank in 2024 and with Standard Chartered in 2025 to deepen local-currency financing across African markets.

Financial markets remained the dominant sector, with $8.8 billion in own-account long-term commitments (48.2% of total) in FY2025, followed by infrastructure ($2.2 billion, 12.0%), tourism, retail and property ($1.6 billion, 8.9%), and manufacturing ($1.5 billion, 8.1%). IFC's Financial Institutions Group (FIG) accounts for roughly half of IFC's own-account long-term commitments, working with over 700 financial institution clients globally.

India was IFC's largest single country exposure at $10.3 billion (11.4% of global portfolio) as of June 30, 2025, followed by Brazil ($7.1 billion, 7.9%), Türkiye ($5.6 billion, 6.2%), South Africa ($4.0 billion, 4.4%), China ($3.1 billion, 3.4%), Colombia ($2.8 billion), Chile ($2.4 billion), Egypt ($2.4 billion), Romania ($2.4 billion), and Vietnam ($2.2 billion). The total disbursed investment portfolio stood at $67.5 billion in FY2025, and total portfolio exposure was $90.6 billion across 2,121 firms.

The strategy's targets include doubling its investment program within three years, doubling the long-term finance mobilization ratio, growing its portfolio by 40%, tripling annual climate-related own-account financing, and quadrupling annual own-account financing to women and women-owned SMEs. Beginning July 1, 2025, all new IFC investments were 100% aligned with the Paris Agreement, with a target that 45% of annual financing go to climate.

=== Income and profitability ===
IFC's net income is structurally volatile because of the mark-to-market treatment of its equity portfolio, liquid asset portfolio, and — since FY2025 — its own borrowings under fair value option accounting.

IFC net income/loss and total assets (USD billions)
Fiscal Year	Net Income (Loss)	Total Assets
FY2020	($1,672M) — net loss	$105.3B
FY2021	$4,209M	$105.3B
FY2022	($464M) — net loss	$99.0B
FY2023	$672M	$110.5B
FY2024	$1,485M	$108.2B
FY2025	$2,007M	$129.7B

Source: IFC Annual Report Financial Statements (audited)

The FY2020 loss reflected equity portfolio impairments and provisioning for loan losses in the early months of the COVID-19 pandemic. FY2021 income of $4.2 billion was driven by $3.3 billion in unrealized equity gains as global markets rebounded. The FY2022 loss of $464 million resulted from unrealized losses in the liquid asset portfolio as US Treasury yields rose sharply — a consequence of IFC's interest rate exposure in its liquid reserves, not portfolio deterioration. FY2025 net income of $2.0 billion — the highest in several years — was driven by higher unrealized gains on borrowings, increased equity income, and treasury income.

IFC's capital utilization ratio was 61.6% in FY2025, within its target operating range. The non-performing loan ratio fell to approximately 1.5% in FY2025, the lowest level since FY2010.

=== Credit ratings and bond program ===
IFC maintains AAA/Aaa long-term ratings from all three major credit rating agencies with stable outlooks:

IFC credit ratings (As of 2025)
Agency	Long-Term Rating	Short-Term	Outlook
Moody's	Aaa	(P)P-1	Stable
S&P Global	AAA	A-1+	Stable
Fitch	AAA	F1+	Stable

Source: Moody's Credit Opinion, December 2025

Moody's December 2025 credit opinion cited IFC's strong capital position with low leverage, ample liquidity buffers, a highly rated shareholder base, and a CIS-1 ESG credit impact score. Reuters noted in September 2024 that IFC must "carefully evaluate the implications" for its "highly sought-after AAA rating" when boosting equity investments.

In November 2023, IFC issued a $1.5 billion three-year social bond — the largest social bond in IFC history and the largest USD social bond by any supranational institution in 2023. IFC followed this in 2025 with a record $2 billion social bond. IFC's FY26 annual funding program target is up to $20 billion, with $68.1 billion in outstanding debt as of FY25.

== Development impact ==
=== AIMM framework ===
IFC's Development Outcome Tracking System (DOTS), introduced in 2005, rated the development outcomes of IFC investments along four dimensions: financial performance, economic performance, environmental and social performance, and private-sector development impact. DOTS was succeeded in 2017 by the Anticipated Impact Measurement and Monitoring (AIMM) system.

AIMM, integrated into all IFC investment projects from January 2018, scores every new investment project ex-ante on two dimensions: project outcomes (direct effects on workers, customers, suppliers, and communities) and market outcomes (catalytic effects on broader market development). Over 2,900 investment projects have been assessed under the framework.

In FY2025, 281 projects were committed with an average AIMM score of 58, up 3 points from FY2024 and up 9 points from the 2019 baseline. However, the IEG's RAP 2024 found that in an analysis of 21 projects, 43% of market-level outcomes had no tracking indicators in the AIMM system.

The IEG found that IFC investment project development outcome performance troughed at 41% mostly successful (calendar years 2016–18) before recovering to 51% (CY2021–23) — still below the 53% achieved in CY2013–15. IFC work quality ratings declined from 62% satisfactory or better (CY2013–15) to 55% (CY2021–23).

In FY2025, 88% of the 141 projects that completed implementation received at least a "Satisfactory" development impact rating, representing 94% of corresponding commitment volume.

=== Global Emerging Markets Risk Database ===
IFC manages the Global Emerging Markets Risk Database Consortium (GEMs), established in 2009 as a joint initiative with the European Investment Bank. It is the largest database of historical default rates, recovery rates, and credit-migration statistics for borrowers in emerging markets, with data contributed by over 25 multilateral development banks and development finance institutions. In 2023–2024, responding to calls from the G20 and academic researchers, IFC began making portions of the GEMs data publicly available for the first time — intended to help commercial banks and institutional investors make better-informed decisions about emerging-market credit risk. The Financial Times reported in April 2024 that IFC data shows investment risks in emerging market companies compare favorably with those experienced in other asset classes.

=== Key impact metrics ===
In FY2025, IFC's portfolio results reported through the World Bank Group scorecard included:

89.4 million people provided with electricity

147.7 million people with broadband internet service

72.3 million individuals and firms receiving access to financial services

68.3 million people provided with health, nutrition, and population services

51.7 million people with improved access to sustainable transport

15.3 GW of renewable energy capacity enabled in the portfolio

26.3 million people benefiting from enhanced climate resilience

4 million people with new or improved water and sanitation access

$41.1 billion in private capital enabled

== Products and services ==
=== Private capital mobilization ===
==== Securitization ====
IFC completed its inaugural securitization in September 2025 through the Emerging Markets Securitization Program (EMSP), formerly the Warehouse-Enabled Securitization Program (WESP). The transaction — IFC Emerging Markets Securitization 2025–1, Ltd — packaged loans to 57 companies across 28 countries into a $510 million collateralized loan obligation arranged by Goldman Sachs and listed on the London Stock Exchange. The $320 million senior tranche, rated Aaa by Moody's, was priced at 130 basis points over SOFR; IFC retained the $130 million mezzanine and $60 million equity tranches, retaining at least 25% own-account risk per underlying loan. The sector mix spanned food and beverage (18.8%), telecommunications (13%), and construction (13%). The Financial Times described the transaction as "a template to boost flows into developing countries" and the first true-sale securitization by a multilateral development bank backed by emerging market corporate loans.

==== Trade and supply chain finance ====
IFC's Global Trade Finance Program (GTFP) had supported $130 billion in trade finance for approximately 200,000 firms in its first 20 years of operation, with 40% of activity concentrated in Africa and one-third in agriculture and food sectors. The global trade finance gap doubled between 2017 and 2025 to $2.5 trillion, with SMEs in high-potential markets bearing the majority of this shortfall. In October 2024, at the World Bank Group Annual Meetings, IFC tripled the limit on its Global Supply Chain Finance Program from $1 billion to $3 billion, alongside a joint commitment by six multilateral development banks and the World Trade Organization to expand supply chain finance in emerging markets. The Global Trade Supplier Finance program disbursed $3.5 billion to more than 350 suppliers in FY2025, with 73% in sustainability-linked facilities and 60% to suppliers in the world's poorest countries; cumulative disbursements since 2012 total $18.6 billion to 2,500 suppliers across 33 countries.

==== Managed Co-Lending Portfolio Program ====
The Managed Co-Lending Portfolio Program (MCPP), IFC's flagship syndications platform, allows institutional investors — pension funds, insurance companies, sovereign wealth funds — and credit insurers to invest alongside IFC on commercial terms in globally diversified loan portfolios. Launched in 2013, MCPP operates like an index fund for emerging market private sector lending: investors commit capital upfront and receive participations in IFC-originated loans meeting agreed eligibility criteria. As of February 2026, MCPP mobilization totals $25.5 billion across funds and credit risk capacity from 18 partners.

The program's inaugural iteration, MCPP SAFE (2013), was a $3 billion trust fund co-investment by China's State Administration of Foreign Exchange (SAFE) — the reserves manager of the People's Bank of China — fully deployed over five years to 2018. In 2016, IFC launched MCPP Infrastructure with Allianz Global Investors as anchor partner, committing $500 million toward a $5 billion target for senior emerging-market infrastructure debt; IFC provided a junior first-loss credit enhancement to improve investors' risk profile toward investment grade. In September 2017, the Hong Kong Monetary Authority (HKMA) committed $1 billion to MCPP, doubling total MCPP financing available at the time to approximately $6 billion and covering cross-sectoral lending in over 100 countries.

At COP26 in November 2021, IFC and partners established MCPP One Planet — a $3 billion platform combining private B-Loan and sovereign trust fund structures in a single cross-sectoral portfolio of Paris Agreement–aligned emerging-market loans, with Allianz Global Investors managing the B-Loan vehicle and HKMA the trust fund component.

The credit insurance sub-program of MCPP, targeting financial institution lending, launched in 2017 at $1 billion with two insurers and expanded through successive iterations: MCPP FIG II ($2 billion, June 2020, six insurers, designed to enable up to $5 billion in IFC lending over four years), MCPP FIG III ($3.5 billion, September 2023, 13 insurers, designed to enable more than $7 billion in new IFC lending over six years), and MCPP Real Sector ($3 billion, December 2024, 14 insurers). The MCPP Real Sector iteration was IFC's first credit insurance facility targeting non-financial sectors — energy, transport, telecoms, agribusiness, and manufacturing — as all prior MCPP credit insurance iterations had covered financial institution lending exclusively. By December 2024, MCPP had supported 329 clients across 68 countries. In February 2026, IFC and 19 global insurance companies — including AIG, Swiss Re, Allianz Trade, AXA XL, Chubb, and Munich Re — signed a $6 billion credit insurance facility, the fifth iteration of the credit insurer program. Across all five iterations since 2017, total MCPP credit insurance mobilization reached $15.5 billion. Combined with the fund platforms, total MCPP mobilization across all instruments reached $25.5 billion.

==== B-loan syndications ====
IFC's B-loan syndication program — created by IFC in 1959 as the world's oldest development finance syndication structure — recorded $14.256 billion in syndication commitments in FY2025, a 76% increase from $8.079 billion in FY2024 and the largest single-year increase in program history; the outstanding syndicated loan portfolio reached $20.735 billion. Over the program's full history, IFC has mobilized more than $130 billion in debt financing from more than 500 investment partners. IFC's Master Cooperation Agreement for parallel development finance institution co-lending has more than 35 signatory institutions and has mobilized over $19 billion in loans to developing-country borrowers.

==== Bond program and capital markets ====
IFC raised a record $21.4 billion through its bond program in FY2025 across 19 currencies — well above the initial target of $12–13 billion and the largest annual funding volume in its history. Notable issuances included a £650 million sterling bond in July 2025 — IFC's first sterling-denominated social bond, later tapped to £1 billion — and a HKD 5 billion social bond in April 2025, the largest Hong Kong dollar-denominated issuance by a supranational organization to that date.

==== Significant risk transfers ====
IFC has pioneered significant risk transfer (SRT) transactions in emerging market and developing economies since the mid-2010s, the only multilateral development bank active globally in emerging market SRTs. Cumulative SRT commitments exceeded $1.1 billion through FY2025. In November 2025, IFC and Crédit Agricole CIB closed an SRT covering a $2 billion trade finance portfolio, with IFC providing a $95 million financial guarantee to enable new emerging market trade finance commitments by Crédit Agricole CIB.

==== Partnership platforms ====
In February 2026, IFC and 19 global insurance companies — including AIG, Swiss Re, Allianz Trade, AXA XL, AXIS Capital, Chubb, Munich Re, and Tokio Marine — signed a $6 billion credit insurance facility, the fifth iteration of IFC's MCPP for Credit Insurers program. The facility, IFC's largest single mobilization agreement, is designed to support up to $10 billion in new IFC lending, primarily to banks serving small and medium enterprises. With this facility, total Managed Co-Lending Portfolio Program (MCPP) mobilization reached $25.5 billion across funds and credit risk capacity.

In April 2025, the European Commission signed the Better Futures Programme with IFC — part of the Global Gateway initiative — providing up to €291 million in guarantees from the European Fund for Sustainable Development Plus (EFSD+) expected to mobilize more than $1 billion in private sector investments across Southeast Europe, Türkiye, Asia-Pacific, Sub-Saharan Africa, MENA, Latin America, and the Western Balkans through April 2028. In September 2025, IFC participated in the first close of Singapore's Financing Asia's Transition Partnership (FAST-P) Green Investments Partnership, which reached $510 million in committed capital under fund manager Pentagreen Capital — a sustainable infrastructure debt platform co-founded by HSBC and Temasek. Also in September 2025, IFC jointly launched a Blue Economy Bond strategy with T. Rowe Price, raising more than $200 million in initial commitments from IFC, T. Rowe Price, Xylem Inc., and Builders Vision to invest in corporate bonds by financial institutions and companies engaged in marine ecosystem conservation, wastewater treatment, and coastal climate adaptation in emerging markets.

=== MSME and financial institutions ===
==== MSME finance gap ====
A March 2025 report by IFC and the SME Finance Forum re-estimated the MSME finance gap in 119 emerging market and developing economies at $5.7 trillion for formal enterprises, rising to $8 trillion when informal enterprises are included — a 27% increase from the $4.4 trillion gap estimated in 2017. Women-owned MSMEs account for 34% of the total gap. In May 2024, IFC launched a $4 billion MSME Finance Platform for financial institutions, paired with a Catalytic First Loss Guarantee designed to crowd in an additional $4 billion from eligible financial service providers. IFC's Financial Institutions Group had 74 million loans to MSMEs and a committed portfolio of $18.2 billion as of October 2025. Through its financial institution clients, IFC reported 44 million loans to microenterprises totaling $50 billion, and 5.6 million loans to SMEs totaling $385 billion, as of 2024.

==== Financial institution lending ====
IFC extends MSME financing through commercial banks and non-bank financial institutions across all emerging-market regions. In February 2026, IFC and Banco Industrial of Guatemala closed an $850 million MSME financing package — a $100 million IFC subordinated loan paired with a $750 million bond placement in international capital markets — structured as the world's first "C/B Loan" issued by a financial institution and the largest subordinated debt placement by a financial institution in Central America; investor orders exceeded $2.8 billion. In December 2025, IFC made its first long-term investment in the Argentine financial system in over seven years with a $150 million loan to BBVA Argentina for long-tenor SME financing in a market where SMEs represent 98.6% of all firms and nearly 65% of private sector employment. In September 2025, IFC provided a $100 million loan to FirstRand Bank of South Africa — where approximately 5% of formal MSMEs have access to credit and SMEs account for around 60% of all jobs — to expand MSME lending through FNB, its retail banking division. A separate risk-sharing facility with FirstRand, backed by the European Fund for Sustainable Development, covers 50% of credit risk on up to ZAR 1.8 billion of SME loans with a targeted focus on women-owned businesses and climate-smart agriculture.

In January 2026, IFC committed $166 million to Sri Lanka's financial sector — its first debt investment there since the country's 2022 economic crisis — comprising a $50 million loan to Nations Trust Bank, risk-sharing facilities totaling $80 million with Commercial Bank of Ceylon and National Development Bank, and a $36 million GTFP trade facility. In the Philippines, IFC committed up to $130 million to Asialink Finance Corporation in January 2025, with at least 60% of proceeds earmarked for women-owned or women-led MSMEs. In April 2023, IFC arranged a $77 million risk-sharing facility with the Bank of Africa Group across ten Sub-Saharan countries — including several fragile and conflict-affected states — expected to generate 12,000 new loans, at least 2,000 to women-owned businesses.

==== Risk-sharing and guarantee facilities ====
IFC's Small Loan Guarantee Program (SLGP), backed by the IDA Private Sector Window Blended Finance Facility, provides a programmatic risk-sharing structure that has been deployed across multiple markets. In February 2026, it supported a $40 million risk-sharing facility with Habib Metropolitan Bank in Pakistan — where fewer than 200,000 of 3.2 million SMEs have formal credit access — and a $10 million facility with Dashen Bank in Ethiopia targeting agribusiness SMEs.

IFC's SME Ventures Program, launched in 2010, invests in private equity funds focused on SMEs in IDA-eligible and fragile or conflict-affected states. As of August 2025, the program had invested $347 million across 18 fund managers, supporting more than 300 SMEs and more than 44,000 jobs in markets where conventional private equity capital is largely absent.

==== Digital financial services ====
IFC and the Mastercard Foundation conducted a seven-year joint initiative that reached 100 million adults through digital financial services in Sub-Saharan Africa, including a $37.4 million Partnership for Financial Inclusion that generated 7.2 million new digital finance users and $300 million in monthly transactions. In September 2025, IFC published the MSME Banking in the Digital Era handbook, offering guidance for financial institutions in Africa and other emerging markets on using digital channels and data analytics to extend MSME lending without traditional collateral requirements.

=== Equity investments ===
==== Portfolio overview ====
IFC is the largest international equity investor in emerging markets, providing long-term equity capital that commercial investors are often unwilling to provide alone. As of June 30, 2025, IFC's disbursed equity portfolio totaled $11.44 billion — 17% of its $68.5 billion total disbursed investment portfolio — comprising $5.64 billion in direct share investments and $6.14 billion in equity interests in private equity funds. Equity income in FY2025 was $517 million, compared with $142 million in FY2024, driven by $219 million in net realized gains and a reversal from $231 million in unrealized losses in FY2024 to $157 million in unrealized gains. The ten-year strategic vision announced in 2025 identifies expanded equity investment as a top priority, characterizing equity as "the scarcest form of financing in emerging markets."

==== Africa equity strategy ====
IFC's Managing Director Makhtar Diop announced in April 2025 that IFC plans to "significantly" increase its equity stakes in Africa over the next five years, noting that companies there are "often over-leveraged because they don't have enough equity." IFC's Africa equity portfolio grew from $2.60 billion in FY2024 to $2.91 billion in FY2025, outpacing IFC's overall equity growth rate. The approach involves partnering with Africa's largest commercial banks to identify companies ready for equity investment and deploying first-loss positions to de-risk private equity investments by African fund managers, with the goal of creating continental-scale businesses.

==== Frontier Opportunities Fund ====
In February 2025, the IFC board approved the Frontier Opportunities Fund, initially capitalized at $100 million from IFC's FY2024 net income, to provide concessional junior equity for investments in difficult or early-stage markets where standard commercial returns are insufficient to attract private capital. The SME Ventures Program, a related equity vehicle launched in 2010, targets first-time and local fund managers in IDA-eligible and fragile states; as of 2025 it had committed $347 million across 18 fund managers, supporting more than 300 SMEs and 44,000 jobs.

=== Private equity and venture capital ===
==== Venture capital and fintech ====
IFC's fintech equity portfolio exceeded $600 million in early-stage and growth-stage companies, making it the largest emerging-market fintech investor. Across all venture capital activity, IFC had invested or committed $3 billion to more than 175 technology companies and more than 120 VC funds, seed funds, and accelerators as of mid-2024. The IFC Startup Catalyst program, launched in 2016, makes $4–6 million investments in accelerators and seed funds in markets with nascent VC ecosystems; as of March 2025, it had supported 25 or more such vehicles that collectively funded 768 startups across 55 emerging markets and achieved 26 successful exits. In November 2022, IFC launched a dedicated $225 million VC platform for Africa, the Middle East, Central Asia, and Pakistan — regions that collectively received less than 2% of $643 billion in global VC funding in 2021 — backed by $50 million from the IDA Private Sector Window Blended Finance Facility.

==== Private equity fund investments ====
IFC is the largest investor in private equity funds in emerging markets, having committed more than $9 billion to approximately 400 PE funds between 2013 and 2023. Research published in January 2026 by the Independent Evaluation Group found that IFC's private equity investments outperformed the MSCI Emerging Markets Index by an average of 16% over the period 1990 to 2023, driven in part by a small number of very high-return deals. A November 2025 IFC research note analyzing 266 direct equity investments in core infrastructure between 1961 and 2020 found a public market equivalent (PME) of 1.17 against the S&P 500 — equivalent to 2.0 percentage points per year of excess return — and a PME of 5.07 for infrastructure investments in Sub-Saharan Africa specifically.

==== Recent fund commitments ====
Among recent PE fund commitments, IFC committed $100 million to Brookfield Asset Management's Catalytic Transition Fund in November 2025, alongside a $75 million co-investment envelope, with the fund targeting business decarbonization, distributed energy systems, and sustainable solutions across Asia, Latin America, Eastern Europe, and the Middle East. In February 2026, IFC committed $25 million to anchor Seraya Partners Fund II's new Southeast Asia emerging markets sleeve, covering Indonesia, Malaysia, the Philippines, Thailand, and Vietnam. Bloomberg reported in February 2026 that IFC was helping global private equity managers set up India-focused funds at an accelerating pace, with its South Asia Funds Group confirming fresh capital already allocated to one India-focused vehicle and a second investment in the process of closing.

== Notable projects, initiatives, and programs ==
=== Global Trade Finance Program ===
IFC's Global Trade Finance Program (GTFP), established in FY2005, extends and complements the capacity of confirming banks to deliver trade financing in new or challenging markets, covering up to 100% of transaction value. The program's ceiling grew from $500 million at launch to $5 billion in 2012, responding to surging demand during the 2008 global financial crisis. Over 20 years, GTFP has facilitated more than $120 billion in trade finance to over 188,000 firms. One-third of activities are in agriculture and food; 40% are in Africa. The program uses master agreements enabling 24–48 hour response via SWIFT.

=== IFC Asset Management Company ===
The IFC Asset Management Company (AMC), established in 2009 as a wholly owned IFC subsidiary, manages third-party institutional capital alongside IFC's own investments in emerging markets. Investors include sovereign wealth funds, pension funds, development finance institutions, and other institutional investors. As of 2025, AMC has raised more than $10 billion from 60-plus investors across 16 funds, invested in 145 companies and funds, fueled 480-plus businesses, generated 103 exits, and returned $6 billion-plus to investors. AMC is a direct outgrowth of IFC's long equity history: IFC coined the term "Emerging Markets," established one of the first EM stock databases (later sold to S&P in 1999), and launched the first publicly traded emerging market country fund on the NYSE.

=== Scaling Solar ===
Scaling Solar is a World Bank Group program, led by IFC, making it easier for governments to procure large, privately financed, grid-connected solar projects quickly and at competitive tariffs — targeting operational status within two years from project launch. The program provides expert project preparation, fully templated procurement documents, pre-approved IFC financing, and MIGA guarantees. Active in 10-plus countries, the program had completed approximately 235 megawatts across Zambia, Senegal, and Uzbekistan as of 2023. In Senegal, two 60-megawatt plants — structured through Scaling Solar — achieved some of the lowest solar tariffs in Sub-Saharan Africa (3.98 and 3.80 Euro cents per kWh) and avoid 89,000 tonnes of CO₂ per year.

=== Global Health Platform ===
In July 2020, IFC launched a $4 billion Global Health Platform — $2 billion from IFC's own account and $2 billion from private-sector partners — to address a severe shortage of medical supplies in developing countries during the COVID-19 pandemic, financing manufacturers of healthcare products, suppliers of critical raw materials, and healthcare service providers. Companies in developed countries were required to commit a share of supply to developing countries. The platform built on an earlier $8 billion IFC fast-track COVID-19 facility launched in March 2020.

=== Country Private Sector Diagnostics ===
Country Private Sector Diagnostics (CPSDs) are joint IFC/World Bank Group analyses prepared for each country to identify where private sector investment can accelerate growth if policy and regulatory barriers are addressed. Launched in 2017 as a core pillar of IFC 3.0, each CPSD discusses the overall business environment, provides deep-dive sector analysis, and identifies investment opportunities. CPSD 2.0, launched in FY2025, represents an updated methodology as the analytical foundation for country and sector strategies driving IFC investment and advisory pipeline.

=== Recent major deals ===
In October 2025, IFC and Appian Capital Advisory launched a $1 billion Critical Minerals and Metals Fund for emerging markets — IFC's first-ever fund partnership with a private mining investor. IFC contributed $100 million as anchor investor. The fund, managed by Appian (~$5 billion AUM), targets nickel, copper, cobalt, and rare earths in Africa and Latin America, with its first investment in Atlantic Nickel's Santa Rita mine in Brazil.

In August 2025, IFC and Brazil's BTG Pactual announced a strategic partnership targeting up to $1 billion in joint investments and private capital mobilized by end of 2028, focusing on sustainability and development in Brazil and across Latin America, including nature-based solutions and the Amazon bioeconomy. IFC separately committed $50 million to BTG Pactual TIG's Latin American reforestation strategy in 2024.

In June 2025, IFC approved a $400 million loan for the Reko Diq copper-gold mine in Balochistan, Pakistan — one of the world's largest undeveloped copper-gold deposits — as part of a broader strategy to double down on Pakistan infrastructure. In August 2025, IFC approved a loan for an Omani polysilicon manufacturing project over US objection, with Reuters reporting it was designed to diversify solar supply chains away from China. IFC also signed a $500 million contract with Iraq's Basrah Gas Company in September 2025 for associated gas capture and port development.

=== Banking on Women ===
IFC's Banking on Women program, operating since 2012, invests in financial institutions in emerging markets to build their capacity to provide capital to women customers and women-led businesses, through loans, equity investments, guarantees, and advisory expertise on gender-smart product design and credit risk methodology.

As of October 2025, Banking on Women has mobilized and invested more than $11 billion across 324 financial institutions in 84 countries. The program has launched 15 gender bonds across 13 countries totaling over $2.6 billion. The GTFP's Banking on Women component has guaranteed more than $285 million in trade finance for women entrepreneurs. In the calendar year 2023 portfolio, IFC's financial institution clients reported 33.4 million MSME loans outstanding to women-owned enterprises with a combined value of $58.9 billion.

Bloomberg reported in May 2024 that IFC was calling for more collateral registries and credit bureaus in emerging economies, noting that women-led firms account for just 15% of exporting businesses.

The Women Entrepreneurs Opportunity Facility (WEOF), launched in 2014 in partnership with the Goldman Sachs Foundation's 10,000 Women Initiative, was the first-of-its-kind global facility providing capital access specifically for women entrepreneurs. By September 2025, WEOF had supported over 267,000 women entrepreneurs across 59 countries and unlocked $3.17 billion in investments — more than five times its original target of 100,000 women and $600 million.

In March 2026, Reuters reported that Fasanara Capital and IFC were launching a ~$100 million initiative to lend to women-owned small businesses in developing countries, with loans averaging ~$50,000 via 100+ fintech platforms, citing a $5.7 trillion global financing gap for small enterprises.

=== 2X Challenge ===
IFC participates in the 2X Challenge, a G7-backed initiative for gender lens investing by development finance institutions launched at the G7 Summit in Canada in 2018, which mobilized $33.63 billion in gender lens investments from 2018 to 2023. A new commitment of at least $20 billion was announced for the 2024–2027 period.

At COP28 in December 2023, IFC launched the She Wins Climate program to accelerate women-led climate startups in emerging markets, noting that only 7% of venture capital funding in emerging markets goes to women-led businesses and only 10% of climate tech investment globally reaches women-led startups.

=== Climate finance ===
IFC issued the world's first green bond in April 2010 — a $200 million private placement structured to direct proceeds exclusively to climate-related investment in emerging markets, widely credited with establishing the concept and launching the global green bond market. In 2013, IFC issued the first global benchmark-size USD green bonds — two $1 billion issuances — helping establish green bonds as a mainstream institutional investment instrument. By 2019, IFC had crossed $10 billion in cumulative green bond issuances; cumulative issuances through June 2025 reached $14.9 billion across 214 bonds in 21 currencies.

The cumulative green bond portfolio through FY2024 has supported 317 projects and results include an estimated 33.1 million tonnes of CO₂-equivalent GHG reductions per year, 43.7 million MWh per year of renewable electricity generated, and 12.3 gigawatts of installed renewable capacity. IFC's Green Bond Framework is rated "Medium Green" with an "Excellent" governance score by S&P Shades of Green.

In FY2024, total sustainable bond issuances reached $3.6 billion — $1.3 billion in green bonds and $2.3 billion in social bonds, representing more than 27% of IFC's total $13 billion FY2024 funding program.

IFC's Climate Change Action Plan (CCAP) for FY2021–FY2025 committed to an average of 35% of own-account long-term finance commitments going to climate-related projects. IFC exceeded this target: the FY2021–FY2024 average was 39.9%, with FY2024 reaching a record 43% ($9.1 billion own-account). In FY2025, own-account climate finance was $8.1 billion (45% of own-account long-term finance), with core mobilization for climate reaching $16.4 billion — a combined total of approximately $24.5 billion.

The FY2024 own-account climate finance breakdown included sustainability-linked finance ($3.3 billion), green buildings ($2.5 billion), renewable energy ($2.3 billion), energy and resource efficiency ($0.8 billion), clean transportation ($0.5 billion), waste and water management ($0.4 billion), and climate-smart agriculture ($0.3 billion). IFC lent $130 million to LMI Holdings (Ghana) for a 1,000-megawatt solar project in 2024 that would increase Ghana's solar generation sevenfold by 2030. IFC also signed a $60 million green financing deal with PT Gunung Raja Paksi Tbk, Indonesia's largest privately owned steel maker, for transition to lower-carbon electric arc furnace production — its first investment in Asian steel in over 10 years.

Starting in FY2025, the World Bank Group raised its annual climate finance target from 35% to 45% of total financing. Over the last decade, IFC committed and mobilized over $62 billion in infrastructure and energy investments.

IFC committed to aligning 85% of new investment projects with the Paris Agreement starting July 2023, and exceeded that threshold in FY2024. Beginning July 1, 2025, IFC committed to 100% Paris alignment for all new investments. IFC uses the Joint MDB Methodological Principles for Paris Alignment assessment, screens all new investments for physical and transition climate risk, and integrates countries' Nationally Determined Contributions into project assessment.

At COP28 in Dubai in December 2023, IFC joined a joint statement with nine other multilateral development banks committing to 45% of annual financing for climate from FY2025. At COP29 in Baku in November 2024, MDBs projected that by 2030 their collective annual climate financing for low- and middle-income countries would reach $120 billion, including $42 billion for adaptation, with private sector mobilization of $65 billion annually.

The Amundi Planet Emerging Green One (AP EGO) fund, launched in March 2018 as a joint initiative between IFC and Amundi, was the world's first and largest green bond fund focused exclusively on green bonds issued by financial institutions in emerging markets. The fund used a layered blended structure with development finance institutions including IFC, EBRD, EIB, and Proparco as anchor investors in junior tranches. By 2024, the fund had invested $1.4 billion into 48 bonds from 18 emerging market countries.

A successor fund — the Sustainable Emerging Economy Development Debt (SEED) Fund — raised $436 million at final close in April 2024, supported by a partial credit guarantee from the IDA Private Sector Window's Blended Finance Facility. A 2024 IEG assessment found the PSW had committed $3.8 billion but noted challenges in measuring additionality.

== Environmental and social framework ==
=== Performance Standards ===
IFC's Sustainability Framework requires investment clients to manage environmental and social risks according to eight Performance Standards (PS). The standards were first issued in 2006 alongside the revised Equator Principles, and revised through extensive global consultation in 2009–2011, taking effect on January 1, 2012. The Sustainability Framework also includes a Sustainability Policy (outlining IFC's due diligence and supervision commitments) and an Access to Information Policy defining public disclosure requirements.

IFC Performance Standards
#	Standard	Key requirements
PS1	Assessment and Management of E&S Risks and Impacts	Environmental and Social Management System (ESMS); community engagement; grievance mechanisms; applies to all investment projects
PS2	Labor and Working Conditions	Fair treatment, non-discrimination; prohibition of child and forced labor; supply chain due diligence; safe working conditions
PS3	Resource Efficiency and Pollution Prevention	Minimizing pollution; energy and water efficiency; GHG emissions reduction; mitigation hierarchy
PS4	Community Health, Safety, and Security	Protecting communities from project-related risks; emergency response; security arrangements
PS5	Land Acquisition and Involuntary Resettlement	Avoiding displacement; adequate compensation; livelihood restoration
PS6	Biodiversity and Natural Resources	Protecting biodiversity and endangered species; sustainable use of living natural resources
PS7	Indigenous Peoples	Free, Prior and Informed Consent (FPIC) in defined circumstances including relocation, cultural heritage, and resource extraction
PS8	Cultural Heritage	Protecting and preserving cultural heritage; consultation with affected communities

Source: IFC Sustainability Policy and Performance Standards Overview

IFC's Performance Standards underpin the Equator Principles, used by 137 financial institutions in 38 countries as of end-2023 as a benchmark for environmental and social risk in project finance, applied across an estimated $4.5 trillion in emerging market investments.

In FY2025, IFC categorized its own-account long-term investments by environmental and social risk level: 13 Category A projects ($1.13 billion), 122 Category B projects ($6.75 billion), 8 Category C projects ($66 million), and 203 Financial Intermediary projects totaling $10.2 billion.

In April 2025, IFC launched a second full review of the Sustainability Framework, the first since 2012, endorsed by the Board in January 2025. The review covers all four components, with Phase I stakeholder dialogue running through early 2026 and a public consultation phase through March 2028. The updated framework is expected in 2028. Civil society organizations have called the review a "generational opportunity" but warned it risks being a procedural update unless it embeds community-led remedy frameworks, mandates full sub-project transparency for FI investments, and strengthens FPIC requirements to align with the UN Declaration on the Rights of Indigenous Peoples.

=== Equator Principles ===
The Equator Principles are a financial-industry framework for assessing and managing environmental and social risk in project finance, based on IFC's Performance Standards and World Bank Group Environmental, Health and Safety Guidelines. They were launched on June 4, 2003, in Washington, D.C., initially adopted by ten banks including ABN AMRO, Barclays, Citigroup, and WestLB. The Principles have gone through four iterations: EP II in July 2006, EP III in June 2013, and EP4 in November 2019. EP4 extended scope to include project-related corporate loans and bridge loans and strengthened human rights due diligence requirements.

Critics have noted that adoption does not always translate into compliance. The Equator Principles faced criticism when several adopting banks participated in financing the Dakota Access Pipeline in 2016–2017, which drew protests from the Standing Rock Sioux Tribe and environmental groups.

=== EDGE green building certification ===
EDGE (Excellence in Design for Greater Efficiencies) is a green building certification system created by IFC in 2015. EDGE requires a minimum 20% projected reduction in energy use, water use, and embodied carbon in materials relative to a standard local baseline building. As of 2025, EDGE has been deployed in approximately 129 countries and has certified over 130 million square meters of floor space across residential, commercial, hospitality, healthcare, education, and other building types. The certification is administered by the Green Business Certification Inc. (GBCI) in most markets.

IFC's cumulative investment portfolio in green buildings since 2015 totals $7.5 billion, and it has identified available green building investment opportunities in emerging markets of $24.7 trillion by 2030. In 2023, IFC recognized 20 global EDGE Champions for their sustainable building commitments.

=== Compliance Advisor Ombudsman ===
The Office of the Compliance Advisor/Ombudsman (CAO) is IFC's independent accountability mechanism, with a mandate to address complaints from people affected by IFC and MIGA projects "in a manner that is fair, objective, and constructive." The CAO operates through three functions: dispute resolution (neutral problem-solving between affected communities and IFC/MIGA clients), compliance (investigating IFC and MIGA compliance with environmental and social policies and assessing harm), and advisory (recommending improvements to IFC and MIGA performance).

Under the 2021 CAO Policy (effective July 1, 2021), the CAO Director General reports directly to the IFC and MIGA Boards — a significant governance change from the prior arrangement in which the CAO reported to the World Bank Group President. Civil society organizations had long advocated for this shift as a prerequisite for genuine CAO independence, and 24 civil society organizations submitted comments in the 2021 policy revision process.

In April 2025, IFC and MIGA Boards approved an Interim Remedial Action Framework — the first remedial action framework adopted by a multilateral development bank — alongside Responsible Exit Principles governing how they exit investments without causing additional environmental and social harm.

In early 2026, the IFC and MIGA Boards commissioned a targeted review of the CAO Policy, addressing five issues: FI eligibility criteria for complaints, referrals to IFC/MIGA management, Management Action Plans, monitoring, and timelines.

== Criticism ==
=== Financial intermediary lending ===
Over 60% of IFC's long-term financing commitments by the early 2020s were channeled through financial intermediaries (FIs) — commercial banks, private equity funds, hedge funds, and leasing companies — rather than directly to projects. A 2013 CAO audit found that 35% of examined cases showed IFC could not verify that FI clients had implemented required environmental and social management systems, and 60% of sub-clients had not improved their E&S practices following IFC investment. The 2015 Oxfam report The Suffering of Others argued IFC was unable to verify whether FI investments complied with its "do no harm" commitments. A 2025 CAO compliance monitoring report found continued gaps in IFC's environmental and social risk management in its FI portfolio. A 2020 external review of IFC's accountability framework found that only 13% of remedial actions taken by IFC in response to non-compliance findings were fully adequate, and that "most CAO non-compliance findings do not lead to effective remedy." A related case involving IFC's 2011 $70 million investment in Ficohsa (Honduras) illustrates the problem: the CAO found IFC's E&S staff had not asked about Ficohsa's exposure to Corporación Dinant — whose owner had documented links to land rights violence — while investment staff who were aware did not inform them.

=== Fossil fuel financing ===
Despite IFC's Paris alignment commitments, environmental organizations have documented continued fossil fuel financing primarily through financial intermediaries. Between 2011 and 2015, IFC made five equity and debt investments in Rizal Commercial Banking Corporation (RCBC) in the Philippines totaling $228 million; after receiving IFC investment, RCBC financed 19 coal-fired power plants. A CAO compliance investigation found that IFC's failure to ensure RCBC applied Performance Standards "very likely caused serious harm to surrounding communities." In January 2025, IFC indicated it would not take action to remedy documented harms; the CAO's monitoring report found "limited evidence of meaningful outcomes" from IFC's remediation effort, and civil society groups described IFC's response as a “coal cash cover-up.” The Bank Climate Advocates coalition, analyzing 350 IFC direct investments and 60 MIGA guarantees from 2012 to 2023, alleged "systematic non-compliance" with IFC's GHG assessment policies, finding that IFC's FI clients were exposed to 68.3 GW of coal-fired power capacity in Asia.

=== Bridge International Academies ===
In October 2023, the CAO published a compliance investigation into IFC's investment in Bridge International Academies, a for-profit chain of low-cost schools that operated in Kenya, Uganda, Nigeria, Liberia, and India during the period of IFC's investment (2014–2022). The CAO found IFC had failed to meet its due diligence and supervision requirements under the Sustainability Policy and Performance Standards 1 and 4, and that IFC had received information about child sexual abuse incidents at Bridge schools but did not act on those reports as early or aggressively as its policies required. In May 2024, World Bank Group President Banga commissioned an external review by Freshfields Bruckhaus Deringer, which was completed in January 2025 and confirmed the CAO's findings. IFC exited its direct investment in Bridge in March 2022 but retained indirect exposure through a financial intermediary, Learn Capital. Inclusive Development International reported in 2025 that one year after the investigation, survivors had received no remedy or accountability.

=== Salala Rubber Corporation ===
In March 2025, the IFC Board approved a Management Action Plan in response to a CAO investigation into IFC's investment in the Salala Rubber Corporation (SRC) in Liberia, responding to a 2019 complaint from Liberian NGOs on behalf of local communities who raised concerns about land and livelihood loss. The CAO found IFC non-compliant in its assessment and monitoring of environmental and social risks. The investigation was completed in December 2023, and the International Consortium of Investigative Journalists published reporting on the case in April 2025.

=== Industrial animal agriculture ===
IFC has been identified as the world's largest multilateral funder of industrial animal agriculture. Between 2017 and 2023, IFC provided an estimated $1.6–1.8 billion in financing to industrial animal farming projects in countries including Vietnam, China, Brazil, Ecuador, and Uganda. In 2024, the World Bank Group invested $650 million in industrial animal agriculture, representing 53% of all such investments analyzed across 16 multilateral finance institutions. A 2025 analysis by the Stop Financing Factory Farming coalition found IFC "failed to enforce its own climate requirements across 38 loans" to animal agriculture projects totaling over $2 billion. IFC has stated its livestock financing goals concern food security, livelihoods, and climate change, noting that 1.3 billion people's livelihoods are tied to livestock, and that financing recipients are required to adhere to their countries' Paris Agreement commitments.

== Legal proceedings ==
=== Jam v. International Finance Corporation (2019) ===
In 2008, IFC approved a $450 million loan to Coastal Gujarat Power Limited, a subsidiary of Tata Power, to finance the 4,000 MW Tata Mundra Ultra Mega Power Plant in Kutch district, Gujarat, India. Local fishing and farming communities filed a complaint with the CAO in 2011, alleging the plant had destroyed freshwater access, caused pollution, and forced displacement; the CAO found IFC had violated its own policies in November 2013 and again in February 2017. Community representatives, represented by EarthRights International, filed suit in US federal court in 2015. On February 27, 2019, the US Supreme Court reversed the lower courts in a 7–1 decision authored by Chief Justice John G. Roberts Jr., holding that the International Organizations Immunities Act of 1945 ties international organization immunity to the evolving standard under the Foreign Sovereign Immunities Act of 1976 — meaning exceptions for commercial activities apply to organizations including IFC. This was the first time the Supreme Court established that US-based international organizations could be sued in federal courts for overseas investment activities causing community harm.

On remand, the DC Circuit affirmed dismissal in July 2021, holding that because Tata Power and its subsidiary's construction and operation "more directly" injured the plaintiffs than IFC's act of approving the loan, the commercial activity exception did not apply; the Supreme Court declined further review in April 2022. In September 2025, the CAO published its third and final monitoring report on the case, concluding that while IFC had implemented most commitments in its 2013 Action Plan, these efforts did not resolve the non-compliance findings; after the client completed loan prepayment in 2018, IFC took no further action.

== See also ==
- World Bank Group
- International Bank for Reconstruction and Development
- International Development Association
- Multilateral Investment Guarantee Agency
- Equator Principles
- Compliance Advisor Ombudsman
- Development finance institution
- Blended finance
- Jam v. International Finance Corporation
- Green bond
- Makhtar Diop
- Bretton Woods system
- Washington Consensus
