= Makhtar Diop =

Senegalese economist (born 1960)

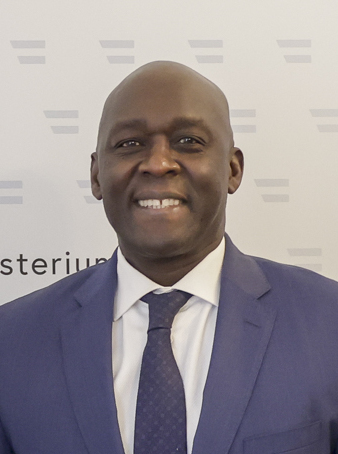
- Diop in 2021

Managing Director of the International Finance Corporation (IFC)
- Incumbent
- Assumed office 01 March 2021
- Preceded by: Philippe Le Houérou (de)

Vice President of the World Bank for Infrastructure
- In office 01 July 2018 – 01 March 2021
- President: David Malpass; Jim Yong Kim
- Succeeded by: Riccardo Puliti

Vice President of the World Bank for Africa
- In office 01 March 2012 – 01 July 2018
- President: Jim Yong Kim; Robert Zoellick
- Preceded by: Oby Ezekwesili
- Succeeded by: Hafez Ghanem

Minister of Economy and Finance
- In office 05 April 2000 – 12 May 2001
- President: Abdoulaye Wade
- Prime Minister: Moustapha Niasse
- Preceded by: Moustapha Diagne (fr)
- Succeeded by: Mamadou Seck

Personal details
- Born: Dakar, Senegal
- Education: University of Warwick; University of Nottingham
- Occupation: Economist

Makhtar Diop (born June 27, 1960) is a Senegalese economist and public official. He is currently the managing director of the International Finance Corporation (IFC), the largest development institution focused on the private sector in emerging markets and developing economies. He is the first African to hold this position. Before his appointment at the IFC, Diop had a series of senior leadership roles at the World Bank and served as Senegal’s Minister of Finance and Economy from 2000 to 2001.

== Early life and education ==
Diop was born on June 27, 1960, in Dakar, Senegal. Diop obtained a master's degree in Finance from a Grande Ecole in France. He also obtained master's degrees in economics at the University of Warwick (MSc) and the University of Nottingham (MPhil) in the United Kingdom. In June 2023, he was awarded an Honorary Doctorate from the University of Ottawa for his contributions to economic development and finance.

== Career ==
=== Early career ===
Diop began his career as a financial analyst. From 1986 to 1993, he served as a technical advisor to the Senegalese Ministry of Economy and Finance. He also worked as an economist at the International Monetary Fund (IMF) between 1997 and 2000.

=== Minister of Economy and Finance, 2000–2001 ===
In April 2000, Diop was appointed Minister of Finance and Economy of Senegal under Prime Minister Moustapha Niasse and President Abdoulaye Wade, making him the youngest person to hold this position in the country's history. Diop chaired the Council of Ministers of the West African Economic and Monetary Union. He played a key role in restructuring the country's Customs and Treasury departments (ref 19, 20). He also launched Senegal’s first "Sovereign Debt Credit Rating" with Standard and Poor’s, the first in Sub-Saharan Africa outside of South Africa. He also played a role in initiatives associated with the Omega Plan MRAP and the New Partnership for Africa’s Development (NEPAD).

=== The World Bank ===
Diop joined the World Bank in October 2001 (ref 22). He was Country Director for Kenya, Somalia, and Eritrea; Sector Director for Finance, Private Sector and Infrastructure for Latin America and the Caribbean; Director of Operations and Strategy for Latin America and the Caribbean; and Country Director for Brazil from 2009 to 2012. The World Bank's Country Partnership Strategy (2012–2015) for Brazil was developed under Diop's leadership.

On May 1, 2012, Diop was appointed by World Bank President Robert Zoellick as the institution's vice president for Africa, responsible for Sub-Saharan countries. In this role, Diop oversaw the institution’s strategy and delivery of $70 billion in funding to promote economic growth, reduce poverty, and enhance resilience across the continent. He was instrumental in expanding financial inclusion programs, especially in rural regions, and in leading infrastructure projects that addressed energy deficits and transportation challenges.

On July 1, 2018, Diop was appointed vice president for Infrastructure at the World Bank. He oversaw the World Bank portfolio for Energy & Extractives, Transport, Digital Development, Infrastructure Finance, Public-Private Partnerships (PPPs), and Guarantees.

=== Managing Director of the International Finance Corporation (IFC) (2021–Present) ===
On March 1, 2021, Diop was appointed managing director and Executive Vice President of the International Finance Corporation (IFC), the private sector arm of the World Bank Group, becoming the first African to hold the position. In his current role, he has championed initiatives to mobilize private sector investment, promote climate finance, and support sustainable development in emerging markets. Diop has also strongly emphasized the importance of fostering innovation and digital transformation in developing economies. Under Diop's leadership, IFC hit a record $56 billion in investments in the 2024 financial year.

== Personal Interests ==
=== Creative Industries ===
Diop hosts the “Creative Development” podcast, where he engages in discussions on cultural innovation, development, and the role of creative industries in spurring economic growth. His guests have included internationally renowned figures such as Idris Elba, Pretty Yende, Chimamanda Ngozi-Adichie, Don Cheadle, Nadia Nadim, Alexandra Cousteau, Lewis Pugh, Anand Mahindra, Vidya Balan, Dia Mirza, Sauti Sol, Baaba Maal, Ablaye Cissoko, Barbara Hendricks, and others. The podcast emerged as Finalist in 15th Annual Shorty Awards.

=== Music ===
Diop is a jazz enthusiast and an advocate for the arts. He has spoken on how the creativity inherent in jazz music influences leadership, problem-solving, and innovation within the realm of finance.

=== Sports ===
In addition to his financial and economic endeavors, Diop is an accomplished karate competitor. A three-time Senegal Karate Champion, he has also represented his country in the World Karate Championships on two occasions, crediting the discipline for fostering resilience and focus in his professional life. He is also a member of Olympism365, a commission of the International Olympic Committee (IOC).

== Recognition ==
Diop’s contributions to economic policy and international development have earned him numerous accolades, including:

- Listed in Jeune Afrique's "50 Most Influential Africans" (2014)
- Awarded the Regents’ Lectureship Award by the University of California, Berkeley (2015)
- Named among the 100 Most Influential Africans by New African Magazine (2017)
- Elevated to Commander in the National Order of the Lion of Senegal by the President Macky Sall (2022)
- Named by Business Insider Africa as one of 5 Highly Influential Africans Leading Top Global Organizations (2024)
