= Amadou Karim Gaye =

Senegalese politician (1913–2000)

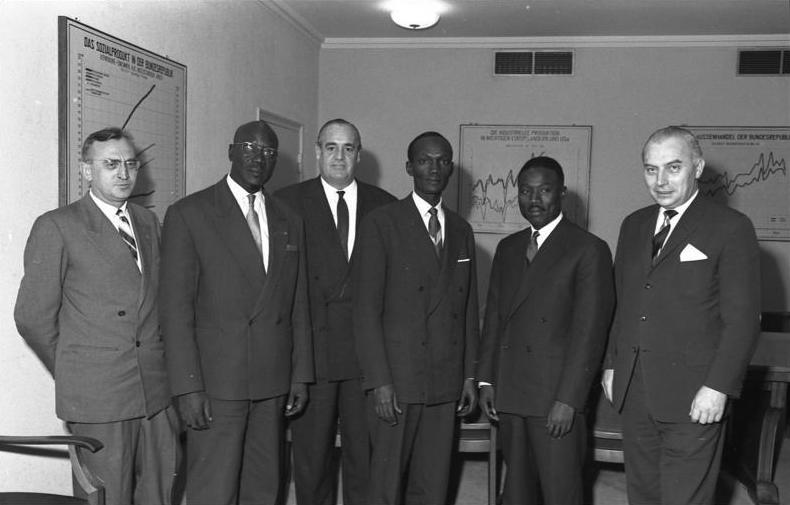
- Gaye (3rd from the right) visiting Bonn in 1960

Foreign Minister of Senegal
- In office 1968–1972
- Preceded by: Alioune Badara M'Bengue
- Succeeded by: Coumba Ndoffène Diouf

3rd Secretary-General of the Organisation of Islamic Cooperation
- In office 1975–1979
- Preceded by: Hassan Tuhami
- Succeeded by: Habib Chatti

Personal details
- Born: November 3, 1913 Saint-Louis, Senegal
- Died: October 2, 2000 (aged 86) Dakar
- Children: Babacar Gaye; Anta Germane Gaye

Amadou Karim Gaye (November 8, 1913 – October 2, 2000) was a Senegalese veterinarian, physician and politician from Saint-Louis. He served as Foreign Minister of Senegal from 1968–1972.
