= Cheikh Tidiane Gadio =

Senegalese politician

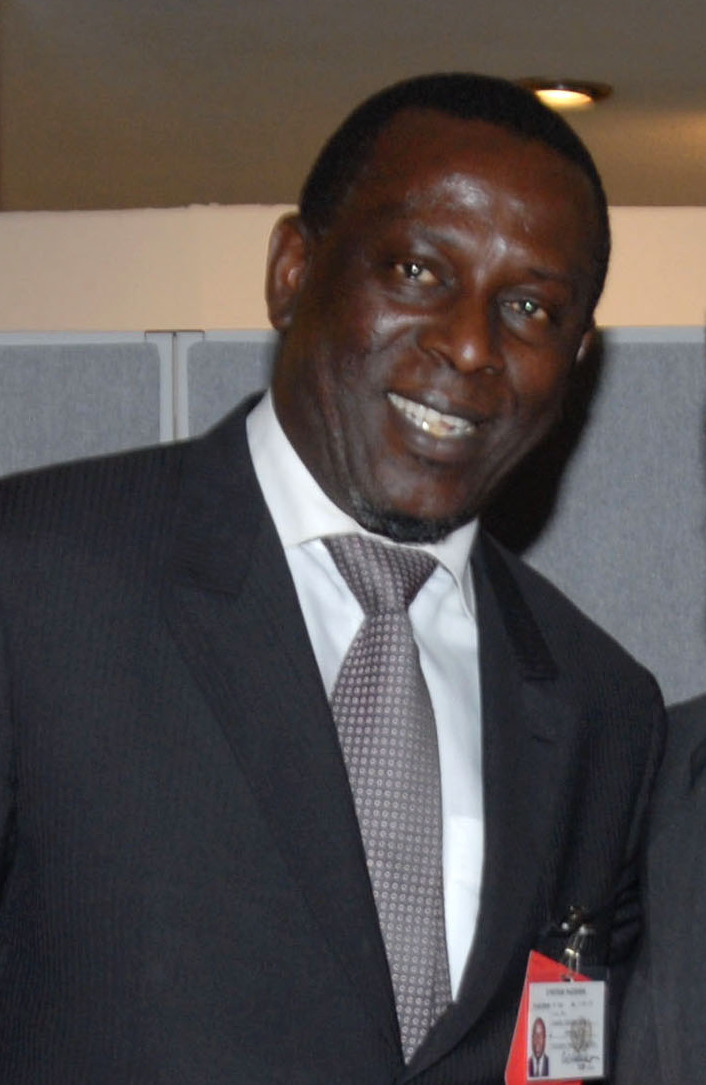
- Cheikh Tidiane Gadio in 2007

Foreign Minister of Senegal
- In office April 3, 2000 – October 1, 2009
- President: Abdoulaye Wade
- Prime Minister: Moustapha Niasse, Mame Madior Boye, Idrissa Seck, Macky Sall, Souleymane Ndéné Ndiaye
- Preceded by: Jacques Baudin
- Succeeded by: Madické Niang

Special Envoy of the Organisation Internationale de la Francophonie to Mali
- Incumbent
- Assumed office September 2020
- Louise Mushikiwabo: Secretary General

Personal details
- Born: 16 September 1956 (age 70) Saint-Louis, Senegal
- Party: Mouvement Politique Citoyen Luy Jot Jotna (MPCL)
- Education: Ohio State University; Paris Diderot University

Cheikh Tidiane Gadio (born 16 September 1956) is a Senegalese political figure and diplomat currently serves as Special Envoy of the Organisation Internationale de la Francophonie (OIF) to Mali (September 2020 – present) and Special Envoy for the Organisation of Islamic Cooperation (OIC) for the Central African Republic.

== Early life ==
Cheikh Tidiane Gadio was born 16 September 1956 in Senegal's first capital, Saint Louis. He comes from a traditional Muslim Fulani family with its origins in the Department of Podor in an area known as Fouta Toro in Northern Senegal. His parents moved to Saint Louis from their native Fouta Toro, both from aristocratic lineage of great Islamic scholars and rulers of the Almamiya of Fouta Toro. Gadio is a fourth-generation descendant of Almamy Youssouf Cire Ly, a famous king-ruler of Fouta who served as Almami for a nearly unprecedented 11 terms. By way of his maternal lineage, he is a grandson of the renown Fulani Scholar Dewo Elimane Moctar Ly, founder of the historic city of Saldé Tebegoutt.

Gadio's father, El Hadj Ousmane Aliou Gadio (from the village of Gadiobe), was a decorated World War II veteran who served as president of the Association of Veterans and Prisoners of War at the Institute of Pape Gueye Fall in Dakar He moved to Dakar at the age of 3, when the Senegalese capital was moved from Saint Louis to Dakar, where he did most of his primary schooling. At age 12, as a exceptional young student, he was tapped to enroll as a young cadet in Prytanée Militaire de Saint Louis, a highly selective international military academy where he was first acquainted with Pan-Africanism through close friendships developed with students from Niger, Côte d'Ivoire and Burkina Faso.

== Education ==
After completing his secondary studies in Senegal, Gadio moved to Paris, France to continue his studies in the following areas:

- 1981: Bachelor’s in Sociology of Development and International Relations (Paris 8 University).
- 1982: Professional Journalism Certificate (CFJ Paris).
- 1983: Master’s in Sociology (Paris 7).
- 1984: D.E.A. in Sociology of Mass Communication (Paris IV-Sorbonne)

After completing his studies in France, Gadio obtained a diploma of practical training in communication technologies and program development for audio-visual education in Montreal in 1986. He later moved to the United States, where he attended the Ohio State University and earned a doctorate in Communication (1994).

== Early career ==
Gadio took on several influential journalistic roles from 1980 to 1996: editor in chief of the Parisian quarterly African review (Tribune Africaine), a journal advocating African unity and new approaches to African development (1980-1984); collaborator and political analyst on African issues for broadcast television weeklies such as "African Time" and "Forum Africain" broadcasting in the Tri-State area of New York, New-Jersey and Connecticut (1992-1994); assistant professor of communication at CESTI, Dakar University in Senegal where he conducted research and lectured on communication technology, television production, political economy of telecommunications, telephony, telematics and internet (1984 – 1988 and 1994 – 1996).

In 1996, Gadio took on the role of coordinator of the US-Africa Institute, then of as the regional director for Africa at the School for international Training (SIT) in Vermont, the accredited college of World Learning, an international organization committed to promoting international understanding and cross-cultural education (1998-1999). During his tenure at SIT, his portfolio included programs in Southern Africa (South Africa, Botswana and Zimbabwe) and Francophone Africa (Morocco, Cameroon, Mali and Madagascar). During the same period, he was also a registered consultant for the United Nations (UNOPS) and the European Commission's Technical Assistance to the third World Countries Programme. He was coordinator for West and Francophone Africa (West and Francophone), World Links for Development Program, WBI, The World Bank in Washington, DC, when he was appointed Minister of Foreign Affairs of Senegal in April 2000.

== Diplomatic and political career ==
Gadio was appointed as Foreign Minister of the Republic of Senegal when Abdoulaye Wade took office as President in April 2000. He was later promoted to the rank of Minister of State, while retaining the foreign affairs portfolio, in November 2002. He was appointed Chairman of the Economic Community of West African States (ECOWAS) Council of Ministers and Chairman of the ECOWAS Peace and Mediation Council, roles in which he served from January 2002 – January 2003. During his tenure as Chairman, he led negotiations that led to the 17 October 2002 signing of the cease-fire agreement that ended the first phase of the Civil War in Côte d'Ivoire. During his tenure as Foreign Minister, Gadio led several successful mediation missions in Madagascar, Guinea Bissau, Sudan, Libya, and Mauritania, to end conflicts and establish peace (e.g., the Dakar Agreement of May 2003 between Madagascar political leaders; the Dakar Peace Agreement of March 2008 between Chad and Sudan; the African Union International Mediation in Mauritania of June 2009; and the resumption of diplomatic ties between Senegal and China, signed 25 October 2005 in Beijing).

At the African Union summit in Accra, Ghana in July 2007, where leaders discussed whether a United States of Africa should be created immediately or gradually, Gadio expressed Senegal's stance in favor of immediate creation, saying that "We are ready to abandon partially or totally our sovereignty to join a unity government in Africa." He mentioned the possibility that Senegal could join a smaller union of willing states if the rest of Africa was not ready.

After more than nine years as Foreign Minister, Gadio was replaced by Madické Niang in the government named on 1 October 2009. No reason was given, although in the Senegalese press it was reported that Gadio had a poor relationship with Karim Wade, the President's son, who also served in the government as Minister of State for International Cooperation, Infrastructure, Air Transport, and Public Works. Gadio was against all attempts of monarchical transfer of power (or worse "dynastic succession"), which he believed President Wade was preparing his son for. In protest, Gadio did not attend the weekly ministerial meetings at the presidential palace for six months prior to his departure from Wade's government.

A few months after his dismissal, Gadio launched a new political movement, the Citizen Political Movement (Mouvement politique citoyen Luy Jot Jotna; MPCL) in May 2010, and reaffirmed his support for pan-Africanism expressing his hope for an "African Renaissance" in the 21st century. Gadio joined the opposition against President Wade's and vowed to combat all efforts to eliminate the second round of presidential elections in Senegal; the proposal to reduce elections to a single round was perceived as a change that would work to Wade's benefit and allow him to install his son in power. Gadio stood in the February 2012 presidential election as one of the candidates of the 23 June Movement (M23), he placed eighth in the elections out of 14 candidates.

== Post-diplomatic service ==
After leaving Wade's government, in November 2009 Gadio co-founded a consulting and advisory firm (Sarata Holding LLC) for "Business and Development Partnerships with Africa," with three locations: Dakar, Washington, DC, Casablanca. He was the Chairman and CEO of that firm until March 2016.

In November 2012, he founded the Pan-African Strategies Institute, and he has subsequently served as its President. Speaking at the Bamako Forum in February 2015, he argued in favor of integration between regions as a step towards African unity. He said that some national borders, such as those separating Senegal from Gambia and Guinea-Bissau, lacked justification and should be eliminated.

Gadio was appointed Special Envoy for the Organization of Islamic Cooperation (OIC) for the Central African Republique in February 2014 and served as such for three years. He was given an additional appointment in 2016 with OIC as the Secretary General Special Representative for Africa in charge of the Mali and Sahel crisis, Boko Haram and The Lake Chad Basin countries. After legislative elections in 2017, in which Gadio's political party participated, he was elected to the Senegalese Parliament as a Congressman for 5 years.

=== Gadio's legal scandal in the U.S. ===
In November 2017, Gadio was accused of being complicit in corrupt acts of CEFC officials that the United States Department of Justice charged were violative of the Foreign Corrupt Practices Act. He was subjected to home confinement in his family home in Maryland for a period of 9 months.

After participating in a 9-month process which included multiple interviews with federal prosecutors, the charges withdrew the charges but offered no explanation for the decision on September 14, 2018. The New York Times article adds, "dismissals of this sort often come with agreements not to prosecute in return for testimony."

Gadio was requested to await the trial of the charged CEFC official before going back home – in case he was needed to testify. Gadio was able to return to Senegal cleared of all charges in December 2018. He immediately regained his position as a congressman and 10 months later was elected as a vice president of the Senegalese Parliament. Gadio, once home, called a press conference, attended by nearly 40 National and international journalists and several media outlets, to issue a statement that, after more than a decade serving at the highest levels of the Senegalese government, he was regarded as having a perfect record in good and ethical governance. He indicated that the US incident could only be termed "a tragic misunderstanding," and that he was glad, after a long process, to reclaim his good name. In October 2019, Gadio was elected as a Vice President of the Senegalese National Assembly.

== Personal life ==
Gadio is married to Ndeye Coumba Mar and a father of three children. His wife is the current United Nations Resident Coordinator for Zambia, responsible for all UN organizations dealing with operational activities for development in the country.

== Honors ==
=== Foreign Honors ===
- France: Legion of Honour – 2001
- Madagascar: National Order of Madagascar – 2003
- Ivory Coast: National Order of the Ivory Coast – 2016

=== Other Recognition ===
- Gadio was awarded distinction for service rendered as President of the African Student Association at Ohio State University in 1992 (year served 1991 – 1992).
- Certificate of Recognition – Cheikh Anta Diop University, Department of Medicine, Pharmacy, and Dentistry – 2009
- Honorary Diploma – Friendship and Solidarity Association between Senegal and Cuba – 2017
- Diploma of Recognition – Dynamic Youth Association in support of actions of African Heads of State - 2020
