= Mamoudou Touré =

Senegalese economist, diplomat, and politician

Minister of the Economy and Finance of Senegal
- In office May 1983 – April 1988
- President: Abdou Diouf
- Preceded by: Ousmane Seck
- Succeeded by: Serigne Lamine Diop

Personal details
- Born: 2 April 1928; Kaédi, French West Africa
- Died: 28 December 2017 (aged 89); Dakar, Senegal

Mamoudou Touré (2 April 1928 – 28 December 2017) was a Senegalese economist, diplomat and politician. He served as Minister of Economy and Finance from May 1983 until April 1988 under former President Abdou Diouf. Under Touré, the government launched a series of agricultural and industrial policies.

Touré was also a former official and economist for the International Monetary Fund (IMF), which he joined in April 1967. He chaired the board of directors of the Senegalese-Tunisian Bank (Banque sénégalo-tunisienne) later in life.

Mamoudou Touré died in Dakar, Senegal, on 28 December 2017, at the age of 89.
