= Foreign Minister of Senegal =

Government position

The Foreign Minister of Senegal is a cabinet-level position in the government of the Republic of Senegal. The position was founded upon independence of Senegal from France in 1960.

== List of Foreign Ministers of Senegal ==
Name (Birth–Death)	Term of office	
Doudou Thiam	1960	1962
André Guillabert	1962	1962
Doudou Thiam	1962	1968
Alioune Badara M'Bengue	1968	1968
Amadou Karim Gaye	1968	1972
Coumba Ndoffène Diouf	1972	1973
Assane Seck	1973	1978
Babacar Ba	1978	1978
Moustapha Niasse	1978	1984
Ibrahima Fall	1984	1990
Seydina Oumar Sy	1990	1991
Djibo Ka	1991	1993
Moustapha Niasse	1993	1998
Jacques Baudin	1998	2000
Cheikh Tidiane Gadio	2000	2009
Madické Niang	2009	2012
Alioune Badara Cissé	2012	2012
Mankeur Ndiaye	2012	2017
Sidiki Kaba	2017	2019
Amadou Ba	2019	2020
Aïssata Tall Sall	2020	2023
Ismaïla Madior Fall	2023	2024
Mankeur Ndiaye	2024	2024
Yassine Fall	2024	2025
Cheikh Niang	2025	Incumbent
