= André Guillabert =

Senegalese politician and diplomat

André Guillabert (15 June 1918 – 24 August 2010) was a Senegalese politician and diplomat. Guillabert was a member of the Senegalese Senate from June 1958 to July 1959. He was also elected to the French senate in 1958. Guillabert was Foreign Minister of Senegal briefly in 1962.

Preceded by Doudou Thiam	Foreign Minister of Senegal; 1962	Succeeded by Doudou Thiam
