= Seydina Oumar Sy =

Senegalese politician

Seydina Oumar Sy (born October 10, 1937 in Kayes) is a Senegalese politician. He served as Foreign Minister of Senegal from 1990 to 1991.

In 1985, he was accredited Ambassador to the European Economic Community

In 2023 in an interview he expressed his opposition to a limitation of a number of president terms, in the context of a debate whether the number of terms for a president of Senegal must be limited to two.
