= Secker =

Secker is a surname. Notable people with the surname include:

- Hans Friedrich Secker (1888–1960), German art historian and museum director
- Jayne Secker (born 1972), English journalist and newsreader
- Kathy Secker (1945–2015), British broadcaster
- Louise Secker, American politician
- Martin Secker (1882–1978), London publisher
- Patrick Secker (born 1956), Australian politician
- Thomas Secker (1693–1768), Archbishop of Canterbury
- William Secker (? – c.1681), Church of England clergyman and religious writer

== See also ==
- Secher
