= Serigne Lamine Diop =

Secretary of State for the Budget
- In office 1978–1980
- President: Léopold Sédar Senghor
- Prime Minister: Abdou Diouf

Minister of Rural Development
- In office January 1981 – 5 April 1983
- President: Abdou Diouf
- Prime Minister: Habib Thiam
- Succeeded by: Bator Diop

Minister of Industrial and Craft Development
- In office 5 April 1983 – April 1988
- President: Abdou Diouf
- Prime Minister: Moustapha Niasse
- Succeeded by: Famara Ibrahima Sagna

Minister of Finance and Economy
- In office April 1988 – April 1990
- President: Abdou Diouf
- Preceded by: Mamoudou Touré
- Succeeded by: Moussa Touré

Keeper of the Seals
- In office April 1990 – June 1993
- President: Abdou Diouf
- Succeeded by: Jacques Baudin

Personal details
- Born: 28 April 1935 Dakar, Senegal
- Died: 16 December 2008 (aged 73) Dakar
- Profession: Statistician
- Awards: Officer de l'Ordre National du Lion (1976); Commandeur de l'Ordre National du Mérite (1977); Grande croix de l'Ordre National du Mérite (2006)

Serigne Lamine Diop (28 April 1935 - 16 December 2008) was a Senegalese statistician and politician, who held several ministerial positions during the presidency of Abdou Diouf.

== Early life ==
Diop attended primary school in Plateau, Dakar, at the school on Thiong St. He attended the Maurice Delafosse technical lycée, the Van Vollenhoven lycée and the Lamine Guèye lycée, where he received the elementary baccalauréat in mathematics. He then pursued higher education at the faculty of sciences in the University of Dakar, receiving a certificate in general mathematics and physics. Diop then went to Paris, where he attended the Paris Institute of Statistics and then ENSAE. He received the diploma of Ingénieur statisticien économiste (ISE) in 1962.

== Statistician ==
Diop returned to Dakar in 1962 after completing his studies in Paris. He joined the Senegalese Statistical Service, where he was responsible for the National accounts until 1965. In that year, he became the first Senegalese person to direct the Senegalese Statistical Service, which became the Directorate of Statistics in the same year. He left the Directorate in April 1974 and was succeeded by Lamine Diop.

In addition to his role as Director, Serigne Lamine Diop taught at the University of Dakar and the National School of Administration and Civil Service (ENAM), which is now the National School of Administration.

Throughout his life, Diop remained involved in the promotion of statistics, both on the national stage through the Senegalese Association of Statisticians and Demographers, of which he was president for several years, and on the international stage, as a member of the International Statistical Institute from 1974 and of the International Association of Survey Statisticians from 1975.

== Public official ==
When Diop left the Directorate of Statistics in 1974, he did so in order to take up the role of Director of Customs in the Ministry of Economy and Finance. He successfully re-organised this important and lucrative branch of government and also introduced a social and health service to customs service. He moved on from this position in 1978, when he was appointed Secretary of State for the Budget, while Abdou Diouf was prime minister. He remained in this role until 1980, when he began a political career.

== Political career ==
Diop's political career began in 1981 when he became Minister of Rural Development in Habib Thiam's government. He held that post until 1983 when he became Minister of Industrial and Craft Development. In 1988 he became Minister of Finance and Economy. From 1990 until 1993, he was Keeper of the Seals.

He remained active after that and was President of the Board of Directors of the Senegalese National Society of Water Usage (SONEES), from 1993 to 1995, then President of the Board of Directors of the Banque Internationale pour le Commerce et l'Industrie du Sénégal (BICIS) until 2001.

== Honours ==
Diop has received the following honours from the Republic of Senegal:

- Officer of the National Order of the Lion (1976)
- Commander of the National Order of Merit (1977)
- Grand Cross of the National Order of Merit (2006)

== Bibliography ==
- Babacar Ndiaye et Waly Ndiaye, Présidents et ministres de la République du Sénégal, Dakar, 2006 (2nd edition), p. 183.
