= Hafez Ghanem =

Egyptian and French economist

Vice President of the World Bank for Eastern and Southern Africa
- In office July 2020 – July 2022
- President: David Malpass
- Preceded by: Himself (Africa)
- Succeeded by: Victoria Kwakwa

Vice President of the World Bank for Africa
- In office 2018–2020
- President: David Malpass; Kristalina Georgieva (Acting); Jim Yong Kim
- Preceded by: Makhtar Diop
- Succeeded by: Himself (Eastern and Southern Africa); Ousmane Diagana (Western and Central Africa)

Vice President of the World Bank for Middle East and North Africa
- In office 2015–2018
- President: Jim Yong Kim
- Preceded by: Inger Andersen
- Succeeded by: Ferid Belhaj

Assistant Director-General at the Food and Agriculture Organization of the United Nations (FAO)
- In office 2007–2012
- Director-General: José Graziano da Silva; Jacques Diouf

Personal details
- Education: American University in Cairo (BA, MA); University of California, Davis (PhD)
- Occupation: Economist

Hafez Ghanem is an economist, a non resident scholar and a senior fellow at Policy Center for the New South.

== Education ==
Ghanem holds a bachelor's in economics from the American University in Cairo and master's degree in economics in the same university. He also has PhD in economics from the University of California, Davis.

== Career ==
Ghanem began his career as an economist at the International Food Policy Research Institute (IFPRI) in Washington, D.C. There, he conducted research on various aspects of agriculture and rural development, with a focus on improving food security and alleviating poverty in developing countries.

In 2008, Ghanem joined the World Bank as a Senior Economist, where he played a key role in shaping the bank's strategy for promoting inclusive growth and sustainable development. Over the years, he has held several leadership positions at the World Bank, including Vice President for Eastern and Southern Africa (2020-2022), Vice President for Africa (2018-2020) and Vice President for the Middle East and North Africa (2015-2018).

As Vice President for Africa, Ghanem oversaw the bank's operations and policy dialogue with countries across the African continent, working to address the region's most pressing development challenges, such as poverty, inequality, and conflict. Under his leadership, the World Bank launched various initiatives to support economic diversification, job creation, and social inclusion in Africa.

In his role as vice president for the Middle East and North Africa, Ghanem focused on supporting the region's transition to more inclusive and sustainable economic systems. He led efforts to enhance regional integration, improve governance and accountability, and boost private sector development in countries affected by conflict and political instability.

Between 2007 and 2012, he served as the Assistant Director-General at the Food and Agriculture Organization of the United Nations (FAO).
