= Alioune Badara Cissé =

Senegalese politician (1958–2021)

Foreign Minister of Senegal
- In office 4 April 2012 – 29 October 2012
- President: Macky Sall
- Preceded by: Madické Niang
- Succeeded by: Mankeur Ndiaye

Personal details
- Born: 7 February 1958 Saint-Louis, Senegal, French West Africa
- Died: 28 August 2021 (aged 63) Dakar, Senegal
- Party: APR

Alioune Badara Cissé (7 February 1958 – 28 August 2021) was a Senegalese politician.

A member of the Alliance for the Republic (APR), he served as Foreign Minister of Senegal from 4 April to 29 October 2012.

== Biography ==
Born in Saint-Louis on 7 February 1958, Cissé passed his primary studies in his native city. He studied foreign language application in English and Spanish at Cheikh Anta Diop University and graduated in 1980. He then studied at Jean Monnet University and the Institut d'études politiques de Toulouse.

In 1988, Cissé returned to Senegal and was admitted to the Dakar Bar, becoming a lawyer in 1992. That year, he was awarded the Hubert H. Humphrey Fellowship Program to study at the University of Minnesota. He earned a doctorate in law from Hamline University School of Law in Saint Paul, Minnesota.

In 2007, Cissé became a special advisor to Prime Minister Macky Sall. When Sall became President, he appointed Cissé to be Foreign Minister. He held the position for seven months before returning to his activities as a lawyer. In August 2015, he was appointed Mediator of the Republic, replacing Serigne Diop.

Alioune Badara Cissé died from complications of COVID-19 in Dakar on 28 August 2021 at the age of 63.
