= Doudou Thiam =

Senegalese diplomat, politician and lawyer

Doudou Thiam (3 February 1926 – 6 July 1999) was a Senegalese diplomat, politician and lawyer. Thiam was the first ever foreign minister of independent Senegal from 1960–1962 and the third from1964–1968. From 1970 until his death in 1999, Thiam was a member of the International Law Commission. During his almost three decades of service on the Commission, Thiam served as Special Rapporteur on one of the major projects of the Commission, the Draft Code of Crimes Against the Peace and Security of Mankind. He was appointed as Special Rapporteur in 1982, and served between 1983 and 1985. His contribution included preparation of 13 reports for the Commission containing detailed analysis, texts and commentaries until completion of the Code containing 20 draft articles in 1996. He also held several offices on the Commission, including the post of Chairman of the Commission.

== Early life and education ==
Doudou Thiam was born on February 3, 1926, in Bambey, in what was then French West Africa. He completed his early schooling in Senegal, earning his baccalauréat in 1944 before traveling to France for higher education. There, he studied law at the University of Paris, where he distinguished himself academically and received awards such as the prix du Droit civil from the city of Paris. Thiam continued his legal studies at the University of Poitiers, earning a Doctorate in Law in 1951 with a dissertation on French citizenship in overseas territories. After completing his education, he returned to West Africa and began a career as a lawyer and public servant, laying the foundation for his later work as a diplomat and statesman.

== Political Philosophy ==
=== Senegalese Independence ===
As Senegal’s first Foreign Minister after independence, Doudou Thiam constantly fought for a foreign policy grounded in the sovereignty of the newly independent Senegalese state. In his influential 1963 work La politique étrangère des États africains, Thiam articulated the foundational ideological and practical principles shaping the foreign policies of post‑colonial African states, emphasizing the necessity for sovereign decision‑making free from the direct influence of former colonial powers and external blocs. Thiam’s approach underscored his belief that true independence must be actively upheld in policy as a living expression of national sovereignty rather than a formal status.

==== Africa's Engagement in the Cold War ====
Amidst the burgeoning of many young nations in West Africa during the early 1960s, Doudou Thiam emerged as a prominent voice in political thought especially given the global context during the independence of these African countries. In a time where many African nations were both forming their doctrines for foreign policy and were facing pressure from both the United States and Soviet Union to pick a side in the contentious Cold War, Thiam strongly advocated for an approach of non-alignment. In a world defined by the ideological conflict between two proposed methods of government, Thiam advocated that African nations take an independent "third way" path, rather than become pawns of either superpower.

===== Skepticism of Pan-Africanism and African Socialism =====
Furthermore, he was one of the first to express skepticism over whether a number of emerging ideals such as Pan-Africanism and African Socialism could be realized in practice. He pointed to institutional shortcomings in newly independent states: lack of a tradition of foreign-policy, the use of imported foreign-policy structures, and especially lack of a democratic/political culture that could provide a stable base for consistent policies.

His views on Pan-Africanism, specifically were especially explicit. Thiam argued that Africa’s future lay not in many small, fragmented “micro-national” states defined by colonial borders, ethnicity or tribal identity, but in a broader continental solidarity grounded in a collective African identity a “macro-nationalism.” For him, Pan-Africanism was a means of achieving genuine African unity and self-determination, transcending arbitrary colonial boundaries and ethnic divisions. Only a politically and culturally united Africa could resist imperialism or neocolonial pressures and realize the shared interests of African peoples in autonomy, development, and dignity.

== Tenure as Foreign Minister of Senegal ==
=== Role in Senegal–U.S. Relations ===
Thiam was the foreign minister of Senegal from both 1960-1962 and from 1966-1968, in 1960 he became the first person to hold this office after Senegal's independence. He is known for his leading role in the tense Senegal U.S. relations amidst the ongoing Cold War during John F. Kennedy's presidency. In his meetings with United States Ambassador Philip Mayer Kaiser, he stressed that the relations between the two countries were at risk. Despite the ideological differences between the two nations which were emphasized at the time of meeting, he detailed how Senegal's relations with the U.S. hinged upon whether the burgeoning nation continued to receive economic support from their western ally.

==== Role in the Dissolution of the Mali Federation ====
When the Mali Federation collapsed in August 1960, Senegal faced the urgent task of securing international recognition of its newly proclaimed independence upon withdrawing from the federation. Under Foreign Minister Doudou Thiam, Senegal’s government argued to the world that its withdrawal was a legitimate assertion of sovereign rights in response to political breakdown within the federation and moved quickly to formalize its status as an independent state. Thiam coordinated Senegal’s diplomatic initiatives, including Senegal’s application for United Nations membership, which was recommended unanimously by the UN Security Council in Resolution 158 on 28 September 1960, just over a month after the federation’s dissolution, clearing the way for its admission to the UN. In these efforts, Thiam is credited with defending the young republic’s interests, articulating its legal and political rationale to other governments, and helping secure the trust of the international community at a critical moment for Senegal’s sovereignty on the world stage.

==== Interim Roles in Executive Positions ====
While involved with the Senegalese government, Doudou Thiam’s responsibilities extended beyond his duties as Foreign Minister. From 1963 to 1968, he was officially styled “Ministre d’État chargé des Affaires étrangères, des Relations avec les Assemblées et de la suppléance du Président de la République,” a title indicating that he was designated to act as a substitute for the President of the Republic when necessary. In this capacity, Thiam assumed the presidential interim in 1964, helping ensure continuity of executive authority during periods when President Léopold Sédar Senghor was unavailable, demonstrating the trust placed in him as a senior statesman, and highlighting his importance not only in diplomacy but also in the broader governance of the young Senegalese state.

== Legacy in African Political Thought ==
=== The Right to Development ===
Key to Doudou Thiam's legacy in International politics was his introduction of "The Right to Development" into the political sphere. Thiam first publicly articulated the notion of a “right to development” for formerly colonized and economically marginalized countries during a landmark speech to the United Nations General Assembly on 23 September 1966. His speech primarily argued that political independence alone was insufficient, and that newly decolonized countries also had a right to social, economic, and collective development. Thiam appealed for a fundamental reshaping of international economic relations grounded in justice, dignity, and equality. In doing this, he laid the conceptual foundations for what would become recognized decades later as a universal human right.

==== Role in the African Charter on Human and People's Rights ====
Thiam's argument helped shape the African Charter on Human and Peoples' Rights (adopted 1981), another central piece of his political legacy, which for the first time among major regional instruments recognized the right to economic, social and cultural development for all peoples, obliging states to work individually and collectively to ensure its realization. By doing so, Thiam and his contemporaries helped expand the human-rights paradigm in Africa beyond civil and political rights making social justice, economic dignity, resource sovereignty and collective welfare central to the continent’s understanding of rights, governance, and post-colonial sovereignty.

===== Impact on International Law and Accountability =====
Doudou Thiam played a central and sustained role in the International Law Commission's efforts to elaborate the Draft Code of Crimes Against the Peace and Security of Mankind. Thiam was appointed Special Rapporteur by the ILC in 1982 and served from 1983-1985, preparing multiple detailed reports that shaped the structure, scope, and content of the draft code. His work involved recommending how international crimes should be defined, formulating draft articles, and providing analytical commentaries on offenses such as war crimes, crimes against humanity and related matters, including consideration of implementation mechanisms and general principles of international criminal law.

=== References ===
Preceded by Post created	Foreign Minister of Senegal; 1960-1962	Succeeded by André Guillabert
Preceded by André Guillabert	Foreign Minister of Senegal; 1962-1968	Succeeded by Alioune Badara M'Bengue
