= Coumba Ndoffène Diouf =

Senegalese politician

Coumba Ndoffène Diouf (born 29 December 1932 in Diakhao) is a Senegalese politician. He served as Foreign Minister of Senegal from 1972–73.

== Biography ==
Succeeding Dr Amadou Karim Gaye, he served as Senegal's Minister of Foreign Affairs from June 1972 to April 1973, when he was succeeded by Professor Assane Seck. From 1973 to 1974, he served as Minister of Public Health and Social Affairs, before becoming Senegal's Ambassador to Ghana. He subsequently served as Director of BICIS and, finally, as Chairman of the Board of Directors of LONASE.

== Honours and Decorations ==
- Gabon
- Saudi Arabia
- Morocco
- Côte d'Ivoire
- Brazil

== Publications ==
- Labour Law in Senegal (Le Droit du Travail au Sénégal)
- Wages in Senegal (Les Salaires au Sénégal)

== Elected and Political Positions ==
- 1968–1974: Member of the National Assembly
- 1967–1974: Secretary-General of the Fatick Departmental Coordination Committee
- 1970: Deputy Secretary-General of the Sine-Saloum Regional Socialist Union
- 1970–1972: Member of the Political Bureau of the Socialist Party

== Administrative and Governmental Positions ==
- 1961–1963: Labour Inspector for the Thiès and Diourbel regions
- 1963–1968: Director of Labour and Social Security
- 1965–1968: Extraordinary Service Adviser to the Supreme Court
- 1965–1968: Lecturer at the National School of Administration (Trade Union Law) and the CFPA (Administrative Vocational Training Centre)
- 1980–1981: Adviser to the President of the Economic and Social Council
- 1970–1971: Minister of the Civil Service and Labour
- 1972–1973: Minister of Foreign Affairs
- 1973–1974: Minister of Public Health
- 1979–1980: Senegalese Ambassador to Ghana
- 1982–1984: Chairman of the Board of Directors of BICIS
- 1995–2000: Chairman of the Board of Directors of LONASE
