= Mamadou Moustapha Ba =

Senegalese politician (1965–2024)

Minister of the Economy and Finance
- In office 17 September 2022 – 6 March 2024
- Preceded by: Abdoulaye Daouda Diallo
- Succeeded by: Cheikh Diba

Personal details
- Born: 6 August 1965 Nioro du Rip, Senegal
- Died: 4 November 2024 (aged 59)
- Party: APR
- Education: École nationale d'économie appliquée University of Antwerp

Mamadou Moustapha Ba (6 August 1965 – 4 November 2024) was a Senegalese politician of the Alliance for the Republic (APR). He served as Minister of the Economy and Finance in the first and second governments of Prime Minister Amadou Ba.

== Life and career ==
Born in Nioro du Rip on 6 August 1965, Ba attended secondary school at the Prytanée militaire de Saint-Louis in Dakar. He then studied at the École nationale d'économie appliquée and the University of Antwerp. In 1992, he began working for the Ministry of the Economy and Finance. On 17 September 2022, he was named executive of the ministry, replacing Abdoulaye Daouda Diallo.

Ba died following a short illness on 4 November 2024, at the age of 59. the Senegalese justice system ordered the postponement of his burial, citing a suspicious death. Ba death certificate was issued in France, having died in France.
