= Cheikh Diba =

Senegal Minister for Finance and Budget

Mr Cheikh Diba
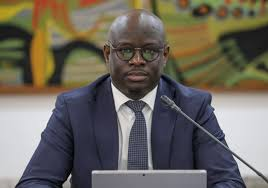
- Cheikh Diba

Minister of Budget, Finance and Economie
- Incumbent
- Assumed office 5 April 2024
- President: Bassirou Diomaye Faye
- Preceded by: Mamadou Moustapha Bâ

Personal details
- Born: 1978 (age 47–48) Darka (Senegal)
- Education: Paris-I-Panthéon-Sorbonne University

Cheikh Diba (born 22 August 1978) is a Senegalese politician. He has been the Senegal's minister for Finance and Budget since 5 April 2024 and since June 1, 2026, he is also the minister of Economie

== Career ==
From May 2022 until the time of his appointment in April 2024, he was the Director of Budget Programming within the General Directorate of the Budget. He was appointed under President Bassirou and Prime Minister Ousmane Sonko (succeeded by Mamadou Moustapha Bâ).
