= Ibrahima Fall (politician) =

Senegalese politician

- Born: 1942 (age 83–84); Tivaouane, western Senegal
- Education: Cheikh Anta Diop University
- Occupation: politician
- Spouse: married
- Children: 5

Ibrahima Fall (born 1942) is a Senegalese political leader, professor, former government minister, and presidential candidate.

== Background ==
Ibrahima Fall was born in 1942 in Tivaouane, western Senegal. He is a married father of five children.

== Career ==
After pursuing a law degree at Cheikh Anta Diop University in Dakar, Fall was in named professor of international and constitutional law at UCAD in 1972. From 1975 to 1981 he was dean of the university.

In 1983, Fall was made Minister of Higher Education in the government of Abdou Diouf, 2nd President of Senegal. From 1984 to 1990, Fall was made Foreign Minister of Senegal, again under the Senegalese Socialist Party government of Diouf.

Fall was later appointed United Nations Under Secretary in charge of human rights and Director of the Center for Human Rights in Geneva, serving that role from 1992 to 1997. In 2002 the United Nations named Fall Special Representative to the Great Lakes Region of Africa and Undersecretary General of Political Affairs. Fall has led the drafting of the African Charter on Human and Peoples Rights by the African Union, is founder of the Senegalese Association for African Unity, and is consultant to several Non Governmental Organisations.

In June 2011, Fall formally announced his candidacy for the 2012 Senegalese presidential elections.
