= Victoria Kwakwa =

Ghanaian economist

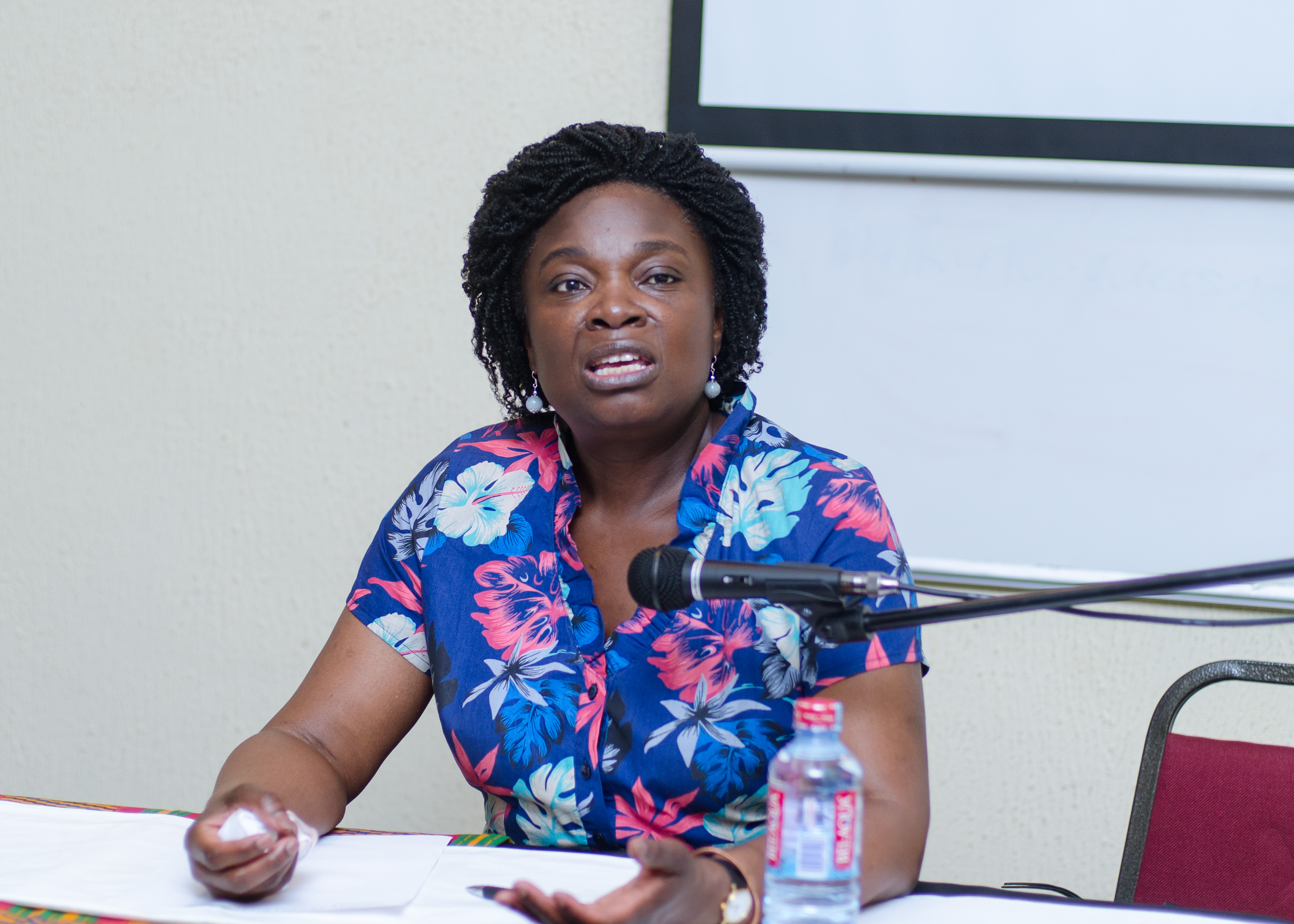

Vice President of the World Bank for Eastern and Southern Africa
- Incumbent
- Assumed office 01 July 2022
- President: Ajay Banga; David Malpass
- Preceded by: Hafez Ghanem

Vice President of the World Bank for Corporate Strategic Initiatives
- In office 01 September 2021 – 01 July 2022
- President: David Malpass

Vice President of the World Bank for East Asia and the Pacific
- In office 15 April 2016 – 01 September 2021
- President: David Malpass; Kristalina Georgieva (Acting); Jim Yong Kim
- Succeeded by: Manuela Ferro (fr)

Personal details
- Born: Ghana
- Education: University of Ghana (BA); Queens University (MA, PhD)
- Occupation: Economist

Victoria Kwakwa is a Ghanaian economist who currently serves as the Vice President of the World Bank for Eastern and Southern Africa. She previously served as the Vice President of the World Bank for Corporate Strategic Initiatives from September 2021 to 1 July 2022.

She also served as vice president at the World Bank for East Asia and the Pacific between April 2016 and August 2021. Prior to that she was country director of the World Bank in Vietnam.

== Early life and education ==
She obtained her B.A. Degree in Economics and Statistics from the University of Ghana, Legon. She later attended Queens University in Kingston, Canada for her M.A. and PhD in Economics with a specialization in International Trade and Finance and Monetary Theory.

== Career ==
She started her career as a young economist with the World Bank (WB) in 1989. As President of the East Asia Pacific Region, Kwakwa was the direct manager of Rodrigo Chaves who was ultimately forced to resign from WB in late 2019 after multiple complaints of sexual harassment and assault. Internal investigations led to his recall to Washington and demotion. Chaves was WB Country Director for Indonesia 2013-19 from which multiple complaints arose. Kwakwa did not take action. Chaves later became the Finance Minister for Costa Rica.
