= Daniel Cabou =

Senegalese politician

Minister of the Economy and Finance of Senegal
- In office 1963–1964
- President: Léopold Sédar Senghor
- Preceded by: Valdiodio Ndiaye
- Succeeded by: Jean Collin

Personal details
- Born: July 6, 1929 Mandina, French West Africa
- Died: December 17, 2018 (aged 89)
- Party: Socialist Party of Senegal
- Education: École nationale de la France d'outre-mer
- Occupation: Politician, Diplomat, Civil Servant

Daniel Cabou (July 6, 1929 – December 17, 2018) was a Senegalese politician, minister, and former Secretary General of the Central Bank of West African States (BCEAO).

== Early life ==
Cabou was born on July 6, 1929, in Mandina, a village founded by his grandfather in the Casamance region of Senegal. He completed his primary education at the Brière de L'Isle School in Saint-Louis, then in Thiès and Ngazobil where he began his secondary studies, which he continued at the Van Vollenhoven High School in Dakar after obtaining a Baccalaureate in July 1950.

He furthered his education at Dakar Institute of Advanced Studies (now Cheikh Anta DIOP University of Dakar), where he spent two years studying Law and Literature. He received a government scholarship to study in France and later enrolled at École nationale de la France d'outre-mer (ENFOM) in Paris.
