= Yassine Fall =

Senegalese economist and politician

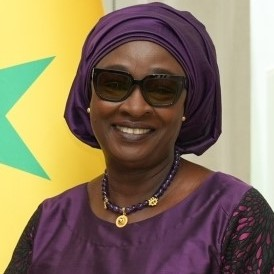
- Fall in 2024

Foreign Minister of Senegal
- Incumbent
- Assumed office 5 April 2024
- President: Bassirou Diomaye Faye
- Prime Minister: Ousmane Sonko
- Preceded by: Mankeur Ndiaye

Personal details
- Born: Ndiangue, Senegal
- Party: PASTEF

Yassine Fall (sometimes spelled Yacine Fall) is a Senegalese economist and politician who has been the country's Minister of Foreign Affairs since April 2024. She worked for fifteen years in various economic and leadership roles for the United Nations and has advised various African governments and organisations on economic policy.

== Early life and education ==
Yassine Fall was born in Ndiangue in Richard Toll in the Waalo and grew up in Pikine. Her father was an imam and her mother was a farmer who practiced traditional basketry. Fall attended John F. Kennedy High School in Dakar and the Ecole Normale des Filles in Thiès.

Fall began studying Spanish at the University of Dakar before moving to the University of Villetaneuse in Paris. She has a Masters in Economics from Howard University and studied for a PhD at the University of Texas, but chose not to defend her thesis in order to return to Senegal and join the UN.

== Career ==
Fall taught mathematics in Washington, D.C. before establishing an international consulting firm based in Dakar and Nairobi in 1983 called African Economists for Social Change. She worked for thirteen years on development issues including food and aid distribution, land management, and eradication of poverty.

Fall worked for the United Nations for fifteen years. She was the UNIFEM Regional Programme Director of Francophone and Lusophone countries in West and Central Africa. For five years, she was executive director of the Association of African Women for Research and Development, mobilising resources to facilitate policy dialogue between governments. With other women economists from around the world, she co-founded the Casablanca Dream Initiative which produced the publication Vision of a Better World: From Crisis to Equality. As a UN Senior Economic Advisor, she was seconded to the UN Millennium Project in New York City in 2003 as Senior Policy on Gender Equality. She contributed to the book The End of Poverty.

In 2006, Fall founded the Africa Women Millennium Initiative (AWOMI), which mobilised women and youth in Senegal, DRC, Mauritania, Mali and Ghana to build capacity and identify leaders for social and economic change. Fall was invited alongside African heads of state Olusegun Obasanjo, Ellen Johnson Sirleaf, Amadou Toumani Toure and Alassane Ouattara by billionaire George Soros to establish the Open Society Initiative for West Africa (OSIWA). She managed the allocation of OSIWA's funds for four years. Fall also co-founded Gender and Economic Reforms in Africa, the International Gender and Trade Network and the Network of African Women Economists. She has been a consultant on economics and gender, poverty, and trade to the United Nations Development Programme, the Food and Agriculture Organization, the World Food Programme, the United Nations High Commissioner for Refugees, UNESCO and the International Labour Organization. She is the president of Def Lila War, a movement for economic independence, social justice and ethics.

=== Political career ===
In December 2018, just before the 2019 presidential election, Fall joined Ousmane Sonko's political party The African Patriots of Senegal for Work, Ethics and Fraternity (PASTEF). In October 2022, she was appointed vice president in charge of international affairs of PASTEF. The party was banned in 2023 after Sonko's arrest for insurrection, a decree that was repealed after PASTEF's General Secretary Bassirou Diomaye Faye won the 2024 presidential election. In March 2023, Fall released a podcast episode in which she criticized President Macky Sall regarding the country's economic and political freedom.

On 5 April 2024, Fall was appointed Minister of Foreign Affairs and African Integration by President Faye. Former President of Liberia, Ellen Johnson Sirleaf publicly congratulated her on her appointment, saying on her official X account, "She brings to the role an accomplished track record as an economist and an understanding of the critical importance of advancing #genderequality to meet the continent’s development goals."

== Selected publications ==
- Fall, Yassine (1997). "Gender Relations in the Democratization Process: An Analysis of Agrarian Policies in Africa". African Issues. 25 (2): 8–11. doi:10.2307/1166736. JSTOR 1166736.
- Fall, Yassine (1999). Africa: Gender, Globalization and Resistance. AAWORD.
- Fall, Yassine (2001). "Gender and Social Implications of Globalisztion: An African Perspective". In Rita Mae Kelly (ed.). Gender, Globalization, and Democratization. Rowman & Littlefield. pp. 49–74. ISBN 978-0-7425-0978-8.
- Zedillo, E.; McArthur, J.W.; Bahadur, C.; Bernstein, S.; Fall, Y. (2005). UN Millennium Development Library: Overview. Routledge. doi:10.4324/9781315065823. ISBN 9781315065823.
- Fall, Yassine (2011). "The Cost of Commodotization of Food and Water for Women". In Devaki Jain; Diane Elson (eds.). Harvesting Feminist Knowledge for Public Policy: Rebuilding Progress. IDRC. pp. 200–223. ISBN 978-81-321-0741-5.
