= Abdoulaye Daouda Diallo =

Senegalese politician

President of the Economic, Social and Environmental Council of Senegal
- Incumbent
- Assumed office April 2023
- Preceded by: Idrissa Seck

Minister of Infrastructure, Land Transport and Accessibility
- In office September 2017 – April 2019
- President: Macky Sall

Minister of the Interior
- In office September 2013 – 2017
- President: Macky Sall

Minister for the Budget
- In office April 2012 – September 2013
- President: Macky Sall
- Prime Minister: Abdoul Mbaye

Abdoulaye Daouda Diallo is a Senegalese politician and the president of Economic, Social and Environmental Council of Senegal since April 2023. He was the first Minister for the Budget under Abdoul Mbaye from April 2012 to September 2013, minister of interior from September 2013 to 2017 and Minister of Infrastructure, Land Transport and Accessibility from September 2017 to April 2019.

== Political career ==
Diallo began his political career as a close associate of President Macky Sall, playing a key role in the formation of the Alliance for the Republic (APR), the political party founded by Sall in 2008. Diallo was among the early technocrats who supported Sall’s bid for the presidency. Following Macky Sall’s election as President of Senegal in 2012, Diallo was appointed Minister of the Interior, a position he held from 2013 to 2017.

In September 2017, he was appointed Minister of Infrastructure, Land Transport, and Opening Up, responsible for directing major public works projects, including the expansion of national road networks and rural connectivity initiatives. Under his oversight, several infrastructure projects tied to the Plan Sénégal Émergent (PSE) were launched, aiming to enhance regional trade and accessibility.

In November 2019, he assumed the position of Minister of Finance and Budget, succeeding Amadou Ba and In September 2022, Abdoulaye Daouda Diallo was appointed Minister, Chief of Staff to the President of the Republic of Senegal

== See also ==
- Minister of the Economy and Finance (Senegal)
