= Secher =

Secher is a surname. It is a protected surname in Denmark. Notable people with the surname include:

- David Secher, British businessman, specializing in research commercialization
- Niels Henry Secher (born 1946), Danish rower and medical researcher
- Steen Secher (born 1959), Danish Olympic sailor
