= Mbaye Seck =

Senegalese footballer

Personal information
- Date of birth: 27 November 1998 (age 27)
- Place of birth: Dakar, Senegal
- Height: 1.78 m (5 ft 10 in)
- Position: Left back

Team information
- Current team: ASD Brusaporto

Youth career
- –2015: Atalanta

Senior career*
Years	Team	Apps	(Gls)
2015–2019	Atalanta	0	(0)
2015–2017	→ Virtus Bergamo (loan)	57	(5)
2017–2019	→ Giana Erminio (loan)	36	(0)
2019–	ASD Brusaporto	9	(0)
- * Club domestic league appearances and goals as of 19:10, 6 April 2020 (UTC)

Mbaye Seck (born 27 November 1998) is a Senegalese football player. He plays for Serie D club ASD Brusaporto.

== Club career ==
He made his Serie C debut for Giana Erminio on 27 August 2017 in a game against Pro Piacenza.
