= Mame Seck Mbacké =

Senegalese writer (1947–2018)

- Born: 1947; Gossas, Senegal
- Died: December 24, 2018 (aged 70–71)
- Education: Institute of Higher International Studies; Sorbonne
- Occupation: Writer

Mame Seck Mbacké (October 1947 – December 24, 2018) was a Senegalese writer. She wrote in French and in Wolof.

== Biography ==
She was born in Gossas. Mbacké studied Social and Economic Development at the Institute of Higher International Studies in Paris. She worked as a diplomat in France and Morocco, then as a social worker at the Senegalese consulate in Paris. In Paris, she completed an International Relations degree at the Sorbonne and post-graduate studies in public health and nutrition at the Pantheon-Sorbonne University. She later worked for the Ministry for Foreign Affairs in Dakar.

Her short story "Mame Touba" was included in the anthology Anthologie de la Nouvelle Sénégalaise (1970–1977).

Mbacké established the publishing house Éditions Sembene in 2006.

== Awards ==
In 1999, she received the Premier Prix de Poésie from the Ministry of Culture of the Republic of Senegal.

== Selected works ==
- Le chant des Séanes, poetry (1987)
- Poèmes en Etincelles, poetry (1999)
- Pluie – Poésie Les Pieds Sur La Mer, poetry (2000)
- Le Froid et le Piment, novel (2000)
- Qui est ma Femme?, play (2000)
- Les Alizés de la Souffrance: Poèmes, poetry (2001)
- Lions de la Teranga: L’Envol Sacré, poetry (2006)
