= Steve Seck =

American judoka

Steve Seck is a former competitive judoka for the United States. Seck was the 1976 alternate for the U.S. Judo Team.

== National Champion ==
In 1978, 1979 and 1980 Seck won the Gold Medal in the US National Championships in Judo. For winning the National Championship, Olympic Trials, and U.S Open in the same year, Seck was elected to the 1980 Black Belt Magazine Hall of Fame. In 1981, Seck would earn silver in the US National Championships.

== Olympics ==
Seck qualified for the 1980 U.S. Judo Olympic team but did not compete due to the U.S. Olympic Committee's boycott of the 1980 Summer Olympics in Moscow, Russia. He was one of 461 athletes to receive a Congressional Gold Medal instead.

== Education ==
Seck attended California State University, Northridge.

== Personal life ==
Seck was a believer in developing mental game plans for Judo matches.

== Gallery ==
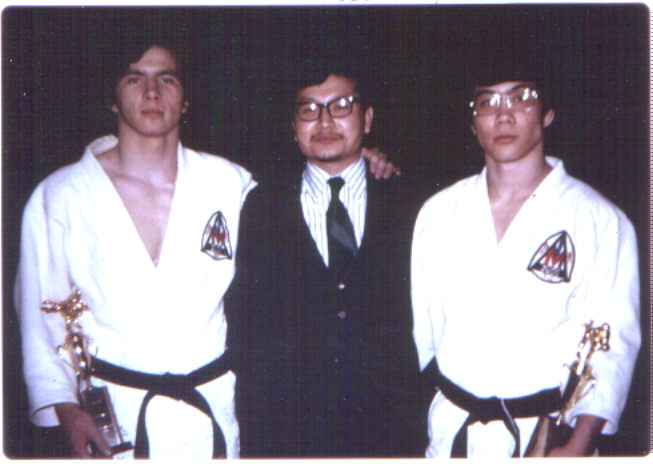
1972 Steve Comer, Mr Sudo, and Steve Seck after a tournament with both placing 1st

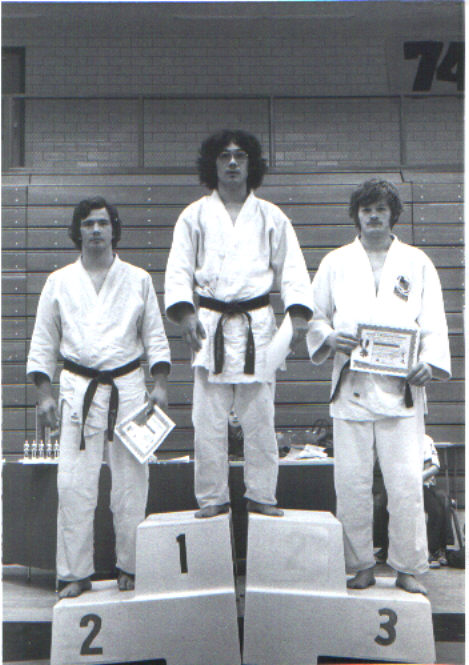
1974 Minnesota State Tournament. L - R Steve Comer, Steve Seck, Al Balker.
