= Alioune Badara M'Bengue =

Senegalese politician (1924–1992)

Alioune Badara

Foreign Minister of Senegal
- In office 1968–1968
- Preceded by: Doudou Thiam
- Succeeded by: Amadou Karim Gaye

Personal details
- Born: 1 February 1924
- Died: 12 November 1992 (aged 68)

Alioune Badara Mbengue (1 February 1924 – 12 November 1992) was a Senegalese politician. He served as Foreign Minister of Senegal in 1968.

Preceded by Doudou Thiam	Foreign Minister of Senegal; 1968	Succeeded by Amadou Karim Gaye
