= Anta Germaine Gaye =

Senegalese painter, sculptor (born 1953)

- Born: 1953 (age 71–72); Saint-Louis, Senegal
- Education: Cheikh Anta Diop University (BA), l'École normale supérieure d'éducation artistique
- Occupation(s): Painter, sculptor, mixed media artist

Anta Germaine Gaye (born 1953) is a Senegalese painter and sculptor.

== Biography ==
Anta Germaine Gaye was born on 1953, in Saint-Louis, Senegal. She attended the Arts Education High School of Dakar. Gaye graduated with a degree in English from Cheikh Anta Diop University in Dakar. She also attended the l'École normale supérieure d'éducation artistique (ENSEA) in Dakar.

She works on painting on glass, reverse glass painting (or sous verre), ceramics, and metal sculpture.

== Exhibitions ==
- 1983: Cosaan (tradition) Daniel Sorano National Theatre of Dakar, Dakar, Senegal
- 1985: American-Senegalese meeting, National Art Gallery of Dakar, Dakar, Senegal
- 1987: Art against Apartheid, Dynamic Museum Dakar, Dakar, Senegal
- 1990: Unita Festival, Pian di Massiano, Perugia, Italy
- 1991: Salon d'Automne, Grand Palais, Paris, France
- 1995: Signes Plus (Helsen), Maison de la Culture de Saint-Gervais, Geneva, Switzerland
- 1996: Finalists for the President of the Republic Prize for the Arts, Dakar, Senegal
- 1998: Le Pont (metal sculpture), Goethe-Institut, Saint-Louis, Senegal
