= Articles of agreement =

Articles of agreement may refer to,

- Ship's articles
- Pirate code
- Articles of Agreement (cricket)
