= Fodé Seck =

Senegalese diplomat

Fodé Seck is a Senegalese diplomat who has been Senegal's Permanent Representative to the United Nations since 2014. He served as the President of the United Nations Security Council for the month of November 2016.

Following his appointment as Permanent Representative to the United Nations, Seck presented his credentials to UN Secretary-General Ban Ki-moon on 19 September 2014.
