= Ousmane Seck =

Senegalese politician

Ousmane Seck (28 May 1938 – 28 January 2018) was a Senegalese politician who served as Minister of the Economy and Finance between 1978 and 1983. He died in Dakar, aged 79.
