= Mamadou Seck (politician) =

Senegalese politician

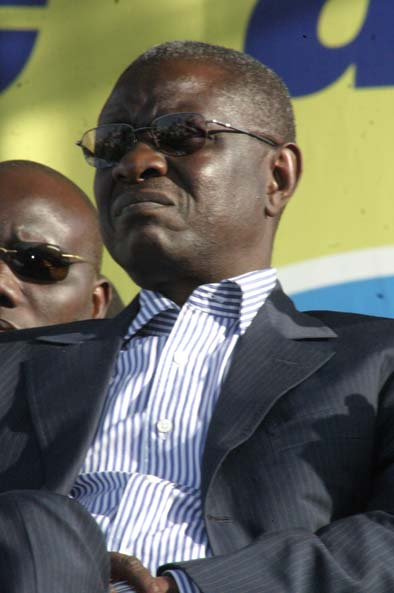

President of the National Assembly of Senegal
- In office 9 November 2008 – 30 July 2012
- President: Abdoulaye Wade
- Preceded by: Macky Sall
- Succeeded by: Moustapha Niasse

Personal details
- Born: 5 August 1947 (age 78) Dakar, Senegal
- Party: Senegalese Democratic Party (Since 1979)

Mamadou Seck is a Senegalese politician who was President of the National Assembly of Senegal from 2008 to 2012. He was briefly Minister of Finance and Economy in 2001, and he was Minister of Infrastructure, Equipment and Transport from 2002 to 2006. He has also served as Mayor of Mbao.

== Political career ==
Seck was Director-General of the Handling and Shipping Company (Société de manutention et de transit, Somicoa) in the 1980s. In connection with a case regarding the diversion of proceeds from the sale of food aid, Seck was given a two-year suspended sentence in 1988. Seck denied wrongdoing.

In the government of Prime Minister Mame Madior Boye, appointed on 12 May 2001, Seck was included as Minister of Finance and Economy. However, his appointment caused attention to be focused on his conviction in the late 1980s, and as a result he promptly resigned from the government on 23 May 2001. According to Seck, he felt this was necessary due to the nature of the allegations and the doubts some had regarding his moral integrity. He was subsequently cleared of wrongdoing by the Court of Appeal in Dakar.

Seck was later appointed to the government as Minister of Infrastructure, Equipment and Transport on 6 November 2002. He held that post until 1 February 2006, when Habib Sy was appointed to replace him. In the June 2007 parliamentary election, Seck was elected to the National Assembly on a departmental list of the Sopi Coalition. He then became the President of the National Assembly's Finance, General Economy, Planning, and Cooperation Committee.

After Macky Sall, the President of the National Assembly, was removed from his position, Seck was elected as President of the National Assembly on 16 November 2008. There were 130 votes in favor of Seck and three against him.
