= Jacques Baudin =

Senegalese politician

Jacques Baudin (14 August 1939 – 25 November 2018) was a Senegalese politician from Diourbel. He served as Foreign Minister of Senegal from 1998 to 2000. He was member of the Committee on the Elimination of Racial Discrimination.
