= List of Cameroonian writers =

This is a list of Cameroonian writers.

- Boé A-Amang (1938– ), playwright and theatre director^{[Jahn]}
- Severin Cecile Abega (1955–2008), French-language fiction writer and anthropologist, author of Les Bimanes, Le Bourreau and Entre Terre et Ciel^{[Gikandi]}
- Imbolo Mbue (1981– ) novelist
- Marie-Therese Assiga Ahanda, chemist and novelist
- Paul-Charles Atangana (1930– ), French-language poet
- Philomène Bassek (1957– ), French-language novelist, author of La Tache de Sang^{[Gikandi]}
- Francis Bebey (1929–2001), author of Les Trois Petits Cireurs, Agatha Moudio'son, The Ashanti Doll, Enfant Pluie and Ministre et le Griot^{[Gikandi]} ^{[Jahn]}
- Jacques Bengono (1938– ), poet and short story writer^{[Jahn]}
- Bate Besong (1954–2007), poet^{[Gikandi]}
- Mongo Beti, pseudonym of Alexandre Biyidi Awala (1932–2001), novelist writing in French^{[Gikandi]} ^{[Jahn]} ^{[Killam & Rowe]}
- Calixthe Beyala (1961– ), novelist writing in French^{[Gikandi]} ^{[Killam & Rowe]}
- Jacques Bonjawo (1960– ), software engineer and columnist
- Hemley Boum (1973– ), novelist
- Bole Butake (1947–2016), playwright^{[Gikandi]}
- Fernando d'Almeida (1955– ), journalist and poet
- Paul Dakeyo (1948– ), poet^{[Gikandi]}
- Jeanne-Louise Djanga (living), novelist and poet
- Sarah Namondo Luma, (1988– ), Christian poet, children's story writer, refugee rights correspondent, travel blogger, Christian blogger, English language teacher
- Nsah Mala (1988– ), poet, fiction writer, children's author
- Mbella Sonne Dipoko (1936–2009), English-language novelist, poet and painter^{[Gikandi]} ^{[Jahn]}
- Lydie Dooh Bunya (1933–2020), journalist and writer
- Ntone Edjabe (1970– ), journalist
- Gaston-Paul Effa (1965– ), novelist^{[Gikandi]}
- Jean Marc Ela (1936–2008), African liberation theologian, author of African Cry and My Faith as an African^{[Jahn]}
- Frieda Ekotto, professor and novelist; Chuchote pas trop/Don't Whisper too Much
- Samuel-Martin Eno Belinga (1935–2004), poet, geologist and civil servant ^{[Jahn]}
- Elolongué Epanya Yondo (1930–1998), poet in French and Duala ^{[Jahn]}
- Valère Epée (1938– ), musician, poet and historian^{[Jahn]}
- Denise Epoté (1954– ), journalist and head of African reporting for TV5 Monde
- Professor Ndumbe Eyoh (1949–2006), playwright
- Alexis Maxime Feyou de Happy, French-language playwright, author of Conscience Ouverte (1974), Dithy (2002), Fairy Tales from Propagamar (2006), Victus Libri/Classic African Art (2008), Les Mezzotiniales (2009), Bodanou le Petit Oiseau Rouge (2010), and La Septieme Colonne/L'Ombre de Meridor (2010)
- Jean Ikelle-Matiba (1936–1984)^{[Jahn]}
- Bernard Fonlon (1924–1986), politician and writer
- Suzanne Kala Lobè (1953–2024), journalist
- Patrice Kayo (1942– ), poet, short story writer and oral storyteller^{[Gikandi]}
- Yodi Karone (1954– ), novelist^{[Gikandi]} ^{[Killam & Rowe]}
- Jacques Kuoh Moukouri (1909–2002), civil servant and autobiographical writer^{[Jahn]}
- Thérèse Kuoh-Moukouri (1938– ), novelist
- Werewere Liking (1950– ), novelist also associated with Côte d'Ivoire^{[Gikandi]}
- 'Sankie Maimo (1930–2013), playwright^{[Jahn]}
- Benjamin Matip (1932–2017), novelist and playwright^{[Jahn]}
- Claude-Joseph M'Bafou-Zetebeg (1948– ), French-language poet
- Achille Mbembe (1957– ), political philosopher
- William Eteki'a Mbumua (1933–2016)^{[Jahn]}
- Rémy Sylvestre Medou Mvomo (1938–2014), novelist and playwright^{[Gikandi]} ^{[Jahn]}
- Rose Epie Mbole (1954— ), journalist and television presenter
- Dualla Misipo (1901–?), autobiographical writer^{[Jahn]}
- Pabé Mongo (1948– ), playwright and novelist^{[Jahn]}
- Evelyne Mpoudi Ngolé (1953– ), French-language novelist, author of Sous La Cendre Le Feu and Petit Jo, Enfant Des Rues
- Engelbert Mveng (1930–1995), Jesuit priest and French-language poet, author of Balafon ^{[Jahn]}
- Bernard Nanga (1934–1985), French-language novelist, author of Les Chauve-Souris^{[Gikandi]}
- David Ndachi Tagne (1958–2006), novelist and journalist^{[Gikandi]}
- Patrice Ndedi-Penda (1945– ), playwright^{[Jahn]}
- Bill F. Ndi (1964– ), English-language poet and playwright, author of K'cracy, Trees in the Storm and Other Poems, Mishaps and Other Poems, Toils and Travails, and Gods in the Ivory Towers ^{[Jahn]}
- Timothee Ndzaagap (1949– ), poet, playwright and story writer^{[Jahn]}
- Patrice Nganang (1970– ), novelist
- Charles Ngandé, French-language poet
- Job Nganthojeff (1936– ), poet^{[Jahn]}
- Jeanne Ngo Mai (1933–2008), French-language poet
- John Emmanuel Akwo Ngoh (c.1940–2008), poet and novelist^{[Jahn]}
- Joel Gustave Nana Ngongang (1982–2015), activist and writer
- Simon Njami (1962– ), novelist^{[Killam & Rowe]}
- Martin Njoya (1944– ), poet^{[Jahn]}
- John Nkemngong Nkengasong (1959– ), poet, playwright, novelist and critic
- Jean-Jacques Nkollo (1962– ), novelist^{[Gikandi]}
- Etienne B. Noumé, pen name of Etienne NKepndep (1944–1970), French-language poet^{[Jahn]}
- Jean-Paul-Nyunaï (1932– ), French-language poet ^{[Jahn]}
- Anne Mireille Nzouankeu, journalist
- Jacques Muriel Nzouankeu (1938– ), short story writer and playwright^{[Jahn]}
- Ernestine Ouandié (1961–2009), journalist
- Joseph Owono (1921–1981), novelist and diplomat^{[Jahn]}
- Ferdinand Oyono (1929–2010 ), novelist^{[Gikandi]} ^{[Jahn]} ^{[Killam & Rowe]}
- Guillaume Oyono-Mbia (1939–2021), playwright writing in English and French, author of Trois Pretendants un mari^{[Gikandi]} ^{[Jahn]} ^{[Killam & Rowe]}
- René Philombé, pseudonym of Philippe-Louis Ombede (1930–2001), novelist and editor^{[Gikandi]} ^{[Jahn]}
- Careen Pilo (fl. 2010s), novelist and diplomat
- Louis-Marie Pouka-M'Bague (1910–1991), journalist and poet^{[Jahn]}
- Simon Rifoé (1943– ), teacher and autobiographical writer^{[Jahn]}
- Francois Sengat-Kuo (1931–1997), French-language poet, author of Fleurs de Laterite, Heures rouges, and Collier de Cauris ^{[Jahn]}
- Alice Delphine Tang (fl 2009), writer and literature lecturer at University of Yaoundé
- Veye Tatah (c. 1971– ), journalist living in Germany
- Marcien Towa
- Florence Tsagué Assopgoum (born 1977), political scientist and writer
- Delphine Zanga Tsogo (1935–2020), feminist and writer^{[Gikandi]}
- Shey Ductu (1991– ), short story and essay writer
- Kelly Mua Kingsly (1977– ), author and professor
- Donald Besong (unknown year of birth), scientist, author of short thrillers with postcolonial and language-debate themes. Contains female minor characters that challenge on-going claims that African literature written by men often trivialize women, as noted by Margarita Johanson and Nkiru Doris Onyemachi.
