= Literature of Cameroon =

Cameroonian literature includes literature in French, English and indigenous languages.

== Overview ==
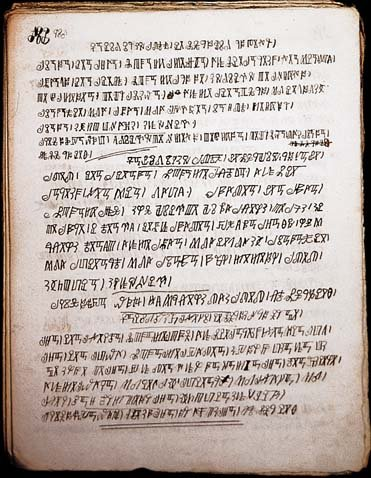
Text in Bamum script, 1910.

Colonial-era writers such as Louis-Marie Pouka and Sankie Maimo were educated by European missionary societies and advocated assimilation into European culture as the means to bring Cameroon into the modern world. Jean-Louis Njemba Medu was a pioneering writer who published the science fiction novel Nnanga Kon in the Bulu language as early as 1932. After World War II, writers such as Mongo Beti and Ferdinand Oyono analysed and criticised colonialism and rejected assimilation. Other older generation writers include Guillaume Oyônô Mbia, Mbella Sonne Dipoko, Francis Bebey, René Philombé and kenjo Jumbam.

Some critically acclaimed writers include Marcien Towa, Imbolo Mbue, Patrice Nganang, Calixthe Beyala, Bate Besong, Gaston-Paul Effa, Werewere Liking, Ba'bila Mutia, John Nkemngong Nkengasong, Bole Butake, Leonora Miano, Francis B Nyamnjoh and Linus T. Asong.

Diplomat and politician Claude-Joseph M’Bafou-Zetebeg also had a successful career as a writer in the post-independence era. His works include poetry like La Couronne d'épines (1973) and L’Oiseau en liberté (2001), as well as theatrical works like Le Martyr du Bouganda (1976). These works focus on themes of freedom, identity, political struggle, and human resilience in times of suffering.

In 2014, Imbolo Mbue signed a million dollar deal with Random House for her debut manuscript. The novel titled Behold the Dreamers follows the travails of a Cameroonian immigrant and a Lehman Brothers executive during the 2008 financial crisis.

== Literary awards ==
International and bilingual English-and-French literary prizes, Grand Prix of Literary Associations (GPLA), were launched in Cameroon in 2013, and are to date the main literary awards in Cameroon. They have already contributed to unveil or confirm many gifted authors, such as Eric Mendi, twice winner in the Belles-Lettres Category, Charles Salé, Fiston Mwanza Mujila, Felwine Sarr, to name a few. The GPLA also pay tribute to deceased authors through the Grand prix de la mémoire, which was awarded to late Cameroonian author Sankie Maimo in the last edition (GPLA 2016).

== See also ==
- Grand Prix of Literary Associations
- List of Cameroonian writers
- Media of Cameroon

== References and further reading ==
- Pierre Fandio, La littérature camerounaise dans le champ social : grandeurs, misères et défis, l'Harmattan, Paris, Budapest, Kinshasa, 2006, 244 p.
- Pierre Fandio, Les lieux incertains du champ littéraire camerounais : la postcolonie à partir de la marge, l'Harmattan, Paris, 2012, 273 p.
- Shadrack Ambanasom, Education of the Deprived: A Study of Four Cameroonian Playwrights. Yaounde: Yaounde University Press, 2003.
- Shadrack Ambanasom, The Cameroon Novel of English Expression: An Introduction. Bamenda; Agwecam, 2007.
- Hilarious Ambe, Change Aesthetics in Anglophone Cameroon Drama and Theatre.Bayreuth African Studies 2007.
- Joyce B Ashuntantang, Landscaping Postcoloniality:The Dissemination of Cameroon Anglophone Literature. Bamenda; Langaa RPCIG, 2009.
- Oscar C Labang, ImagiNation:Theorizing the Nation in Postcolonial Anglophone Cameroon Poetry. Yaounde; Miraclaire Academic Publications, 2012.
