= Anne Tanyi Tang =

- Born: Akiriba, Manyu Division, Cameroon
- Died: June 2, 2019; Yaoundé, Cameroon
- Education: University of Yaoundé (BA); University of Kent (MA); University of St Andrews (PhD)
- Occupations: Playwright, academic, theatre scholar
- Employer: University of Yaoundé I
- Writing career
- Genres: Drama, feminist theatre
- Notable works: Ewa and Other Plays; Chief Ayito and Other Plays; Eneta vs Elimo

Anne Tanyi Tang (died 2 June 2019) was a Cameroonian playwright and academic. Her body of work explores gender dynamics, female agency, and socio-political critique through a distinctly feminist lens, making a lasting contribution to Anglophone Cameroonian literature.

== Biography ==
Anne Tanyi-Tang was born in Akiriba, a village in the Manyu Division of the South West Region of Cameroon.

=== Education ===
Tanyi Tang pursued her higher education across several countries. She first obtained a Bachelor of Arts degree in English from the then University of Yaoundé. She then travelled to the United Kingdom to attend the University of Kent at Canterbury, where she enrolled in the Department of Drama and Theatre Studies within the Faculty of Humanities. In November 1989, she was admitted into a Master of Arts programme. She subsequently transferred to the University of St Andrews in Scotland, where she earned a Doctorate in Drama, Theatre and Social Anthropology in July 1994, from the Department of Social Anthropology, Faculty of Arts.

== Academic career ==
Following the completion of her doctorate, Tanyi Tang built a distinguished academic career in Cameroon. She served as Vice Dean in charge of Programmes and Academic Affairs at the Faculty of Arts of the University of Buea. She later joined the Department of Arts and Archaeology at the University of Yaoundé I, where she held the rank of Associate Professor and continued to teach and write until her death.

== Literary work and themes ==
=== Overview ===
Anne Tanyi Tang's plays contributed to the development of Anglophone Cameroonian drama, particularly through the way they reframed the representation of women on stage.

=== Feminist perspective ===
Examined from a feminist perspective, Tanyi Tang's plays offer a nuanced portrayal of women as assertive, rebellious, and intellectually capable individuals who mount a successful resistance to patriarchy. This portrayal stands in sharp contrast to female characters found in the work of some of her male contemporaries. Her female characters are strikingly self-willed and independent, relying on their intellect to combat familial and social challenges, rather than resorting to the passive or stereotypical roles often assigned to women in African drama.

By situating her stories among urban women navigating both patriarchal structures and post-colonial disillusionment, Tanyi-Tang brought a new vision to Anglophone Cameroonian theatre one that actively celebrated women's achievements in both the public and private spheres.

Her plays tend to project female characters who are empowered in some areas of their lives (such as education and professional work) while simultaneously constrained in others (particularly within marriage). Rather than positing empowerment and disempowerment as opposites, her drama treats them as intertwined forces. As such, her plays function as reformist feminist texts, in which women seek to transform gender relations from within the structures that contain them.

== Selected works ==
=== Plays ===
- Ewa and Other Plays (Éditions CLE, 2000)
- Three Plays: The Heiress; The Song of Ayanta; & Obsession
- Eneta vs Elimo
- Down the Hill
- Visiting America
- Marienuelle
- The Girl Who Sold Oranges and Other Plays (first published 2003)
- Two Plays

=== Non-fiction ===
- Theatre Production and Artistic Directing: Lessons from Bubbles Theatre Troupe

=== Articles ===
- Tanyi-Tang, Anne (2001-03-01). "Theatre for Change: An analysis of two performances by women in Mundemba Sub-Division". Research in Drama Education: The Journal of Applied Theatre and Performance. 6 (1): 23–38. doi:10.1080/13569780020031771. ISSN 1356-9783.

== Awards and Recognition ==
In 2004, Tang received a Fulbright Scholarship for African Principal Researcher.

== Death and legacy ==
Anne Tanyi Tang died on 2 June 2019 at the University Teaching Hospital in Yaoundé. Her passing was widely mourned across Cameroon's literary community. Her death followed those of fellow Anglophone Cameroonian literary figures Bate Besong and Bole Butake, prompting tributes from scholars, students and writers across the country.
