= Theatre of Cameroon =

Theatre of Cameroon consists in the theatrical plays produced across Cameroon. Its history dates back to the pre-colonial time, but it has gained wide popularity since the 1970s, with practitioners such as Daniel Ndo, Dieudonné Afana and David Kemzeu (alias Deiv K. Moktoï). It is made of different trends, some of them are more inflected by the European theatrical tradition, some others are more attuned to the indigenous performative styles. The comic genre is presently dominating so that laughter has become synonymous with modern Cameroon theatre productions, according to Bole Butake. Theatre of Cameroon is sometimes subdivided in traditional theatre, colonial theatre, and post-independence theatre.

== History ==
Cameroonian theatre production starts well before the annexation of Cameroon by the Germans at the Berlin Conference. Traditional ceremonies and rituals, which are made of a combination of dance, music, spoken word and mime, can be seen as forms of theatrical performance. Ambassa Betoko points at the Mvet among the Betis, the Ngondo among the Sawas, and the So among the Ewondos, while Tala interprets the religious ceremony Menda-Nkwe of the North-West Cameroon as a ritual drama. The traditional theatre's main features are multi-mediality, improvisation of the dialogues, and the spontaneous participation of members of the audience in the performance. During the pre-colonial time also missionaries stage theatrical plays, in order to spread their religious message and Christianize the native people. These are dramatizations of Bible passages in the local languages, such as «The parable of the ten virgins», «The birth and death of Christ» and «The treachery of Judas».

During the colonial era, theatre becomes a didactic tool used by teachers in schools. They organize the staging of European playwrights such as Molière, Shakespeare and La Fontaine, in both colonial and local languages, and encourage the writing of new works. According to the colonialist mentality of the time, the goal is to educate and uplift the local viewers from their so-called “primitive” ways of lives, through plays that celebrate the virtues of Western culture.

After independence, there is an upsurge in dramatic production, characterized by artistic-oriented scripts, the use of standard French/English and well-educated publics. The first play of francophone Cameroon is Trois prétendants: un mari by Guillaume Oyono-Mbia, while I am Vindicated by Sankie Maimo is the first play of anglophone Cameroon. Many factors contribute to this favorable situation. A first boost comes from the mass-media and particularly the establishment of radio dramas by such stations as BBC and RFI. The Concours théâtrale interafricain on RFI plays a major role in this regard. The French Cultural Centers are also helpful in so far as they sponsor the staging of plays in French, by offering their halls and giving financial and material assistance to the troupes. The postcolonial state gives some support in the first decades after independence. In 1976, the Ministry of Information and Culture establishes the troupe Théâtre National in the effort to promote African and especially Cameroonian theatre among the wide public. In addition, schools and universities organize theatre clubs to teach theatre culture to the youths. The professionalism of the Yaounde University theatre groups is here remarkable.

Most of the plays center on the conflicts between modernity and tradition, while openly political plays are rare, due to the repressive regimes of Ahmadou Ahidjo and his successor Paul Biya. Within this context, it is an exception the committed work of Bole Butake, which, for example, denounces the so-called Anglophone problem, namely the cultural, economic and political marginalization of Anglophone Cameroon (North-West and South-West regions) by the francophone elites in power. His major creative works are « Lake God », « And palm wine will flow », « The survivors », « Shoes and four men in arms », « Dance of the vampires » and « The Rape of Michelle ». Bole Butake is sometimes considered the boldest and most committed author of Cameroon. Other critics consider Bate Besong as the "most vocal and controversial poet, playwright and scholar" from Anglophone Cameroon so far. For example, Bate Besong's play "Beats of No Nation" forcefully depicts the oppression and marginalisation of Anglophone Cameroonians. Another important political author is Babila Mutia, whose « Before this time yesterday » touches upon the burning question of the UPC rebellion.

Due to the lack of theatre halls and the scarcity of resources, theatrical plays are rarely staged and tend to circulate as texts, often published by the Yaounde Editions C.L.E. They are read by the educated people, but rarely known by the wider public.

Since the 1970s a new kind of theatre has come up, following the huge success of the Radio Cameroon program Radio Trottoir, which launched the comic character of Jean Miché Kankan, an old and greedy bamileke man, performed by Dieudonné Afana. This new kind of farcical theatre is known as “Cameroonian popular theatre” to distance it from more serious forms of theatre. Followed by ordinary people, such as taxi drivers, beer-retailers, and shop-keepers, it circulates widely. Beyond the radio, it is staged in cultural centers, official ceremonies, bars, conference halls, street corners, and recorded on sound cassettes, CDs and videos, sold in markets and by itinerant paddlers. Its main features are comedy, improvisation and linguistic creativity. Its comic quality comes from the exaggerated and grotesque representation of the everyday, through a series of stock characters such as the poor villager and the old man who does not understand the modern world around him. This type of theatre is motivated by the material interest of the practitioners who aim at winning over the widest public as possible in order to earn a living, but it also conveys some social critic, behind its apparent escapism. Unlike other Cameroonian theatrical productions, it is generally oral, sometimes combining dramatic action with musical performances, singing and dancing. The actors improvise the dialogues on the scene and directly address the public that can participate in the creation of the play. They use Camfranglais – i.e. the local vernacular language made of a mix of French, English, Pidgin English, local languages and other Western languages - instead of standard French/English. Taking up the slang of the disadvantaged districts of Douala and Yaounde, they embrace the fluidity of this young and oral language to make up hilarious neologisms. As a result, their plays are set in a very specific Cameroonian setting. However, some Cameroonians condemn this linguistic creativity as a bastardization of Western languages, while others see it as a simple way to win over a non-educated public, without transmitting any social message.

The main promoters of the Cameroonian popular theatre are Daniel Ndo (with the character of Oncle Otsama, the stereotype of the old ewondo villager, who misunderstands the meaning of what is happening in the world around him), Dieudonné Afana (with the character of Jean Miché Kankan, the parody of the stingy and bad-tempered bamileke man), and David Kemzeu (alias Deiv K. Moktoï, with the character of Newrich Proudlove, a professor of “social affarism” who teaches how to get rich fraudulently, without being caught. They are well-known characters not only in Cameroon, but also in the rest of Africa and in the diaspora.

== List of troupes ==
- Théâtre National
- Club d’Art Dramatique
- The Barombi Players
- Théâtre Ecole
- The Flame Players
- Les Tréteaux d’Ebène
- Uhuru Drama
- Les Magouilleurs
- Le Théâtre Experimental
- Les Compagnons de la Comédie
- Les Etoiles de la Capitale
- Le Théâtre Populaire
- Les Compagnons de la Comédie
- Le Théâtre de l’Espoir
- Négro Star
- Le Théâtre Saisonnier
- Les Comédiens Associés
- Troupe du Foyer d’Education et d’Union
- Le Cercle Camerounais d’Art Dramatique
- L’Avant-garde Africaine
- Le Théâtre Professionnel Camerounais
- Musinga Drama Group
- Les Miroirs Convexes
- The Ideal Theatre Troupe, Buea

== Readings ==
- Ambassa Betoko, Marie-Thérèse. 2010. Le théâtre populaire francophone au Cameroun (1970-2003). Paris: Harmattan.
- Bjornson, Richard. 1990. “Writing & popular culture in Cameroon”. Signs & Signals : Popular culture in Africa. Raoul Granqvist (ed.). Umea : Acta Universitatis Umensis. 19-33
- Butake, Bole, Gilbert Doho (eds.). 1988. Théâtre camerounais, Cameroon theatre. Actes du Colloque de Yaounde.
- Fofié, Jacques Raymond. 2007. La création linguistique dramatique au Cameroun. Yaounde: Presses Universitaires de Yaounde.
- Fofié, Jacques Raymond. 2011. Regards historiques et critiques sur le théâtre camerounais. Paris: Harmattan.
- Fuchs, Anne (ed.). 1999. New theatre in francophone and Anglophone Africa. Amsterdam: Rodopi.
- Harrow, Kenneth W. 1982. “Cameroonian Theater: The dialectic of modern and traditional”. The French Review 55. 6. 846–854.
- Kameni, Alain C. P. 2009. Rire des crises postcoloniales. Le discours intermédiatique du théâtre comique populaire et la fictionnalisation de la politique linguistique au Cameroun. Berlin: Lit Verlag.
