= Kouam Tawa =

Kouam Tawa is a Cameroonian playwright, poet and critic.

== Biography ==
=== Childhood and education ===
Kouam Tawa was born on the 31 of May 1974 in Bafoussam in the West region of Cameroon.

=== Career ===
Resident "in the village" in the West region of Cameroon, he engages in literature, theater, and writing and dramaturgy workshops. This leads him to travel to several countries in the Francophone world. He has received several writing grants and is the author of about fifteen plays presented as readings, in space, or performed in Africa, Europe, North America, and Japan. Three children's books are among his latest publications:

Mon garçon, ma fille, Pourquoi m'appelle-t-on parapluie? and L'homme à l'oiseau.

He directs "La compagnie Feugham", a professional theater troupe based in Bafoussam, Cameroon. The company is also a space for writing, exhibition and rehearsals.

== Awards ==
- First prize ACCT for African youth literature.
- Poetry prize from the readers of Lire et faire Lire.
- Winner of writing grants from the Beaumarchais Association, the National Book Center, the En quête d'auteurs AFAA-Beaumarchais program, the Directorate of Music, Dance, Theater and Shows, the Visa for creation program from CulturesFrance and Artcena.

== Works ==
=== Poems ===
- Matin de fête, collection Tango, Éditions Donner à Voir, 2017.
- Le bruit des fleuves, Éditions Tertium, 2017.
- Je verbe, Éditions Clé, 2017.
- Chemin faisant, Éditions Unicité, 2017.
- Danse, Petite lune, album jeunesse, Éditions Rue du Monde, illustration Fred Sochard, 2017.
- Elle(s) (poèmes), Éditions Lanskine, 2016.
- Haut les vents ! (poème), Christophe Chomant Éditeur, 2016.
- Colliers de perles (poèmes), Éditions Al Dante/Le Triangle, 2015.
- Rien ne demeure et autres poèmes, in Poésie d'Afrique Francophone, L'Étrangère, 2013.
- La longue marche (poèmes), in African Renaissances Africaines, Écrire 50 ans d'indépendance, Silvana Editoriale-Bozarbooks, 2010.
- Sais-tu où va le soleil ? (poèmes), avec des tableaux de Marion Lesage, Éditions de La Martinière, 2008.
- Moisson d'amour (poèmes pour la jeunesse), Agence Intergouvernementale de la Francophonie, 1998.

=== Connected articles ===
- Nsah Mala, Maurice Kamto, Bate Besong
