= Evangelical College of Libamba =

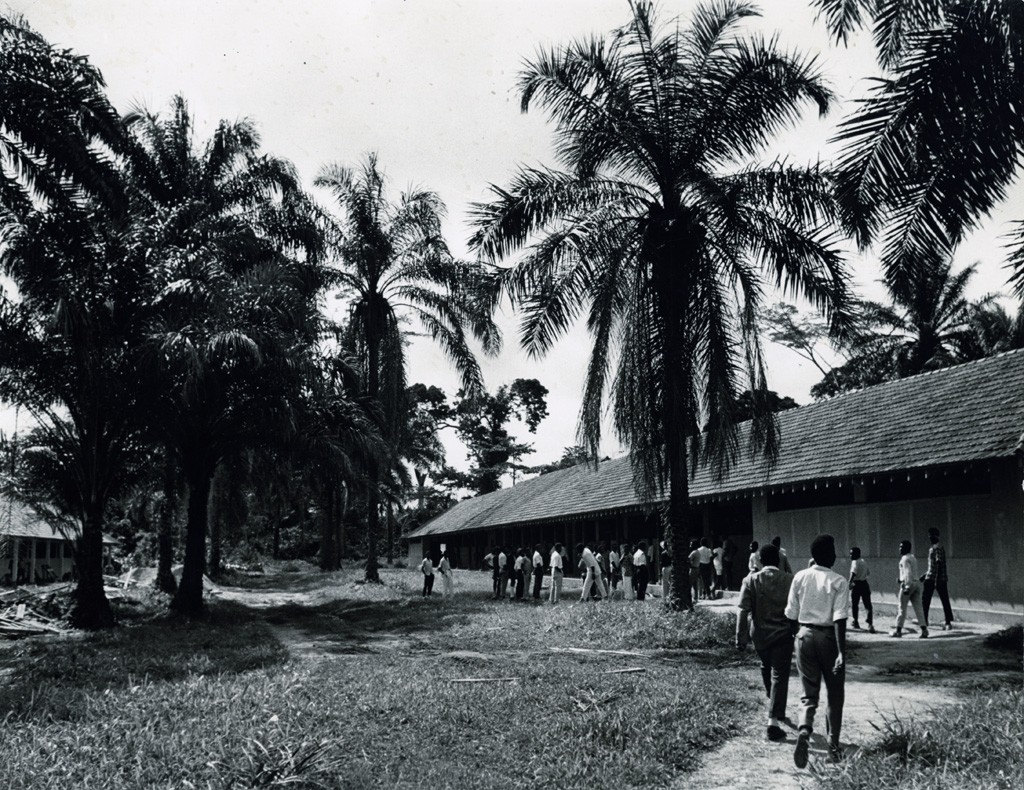

Location
- Libamba; Makak, Centre Region (Cameroon); Cameroon
- Coordinates: 3°33′00″N 11°05′42″E

Information
- Type: Secondary school
- Established: 1945

The Evangelical College of Libamba near Makak was established in 1945 during the expansion of the Presbyterian Church in the Bassa region of Cameroon.

== History ==
Initially named the Institute of Evangelical Missions of Libamba, it later became the Evangelical College of Libamba. The college was created to meet the need, after World War I, to educate Cameroonians up to the baccalaureate level. An elite group of American professors, such as David Gelzer, and European professors were assigned to the school.

The college is located midway along the railway line between the stations of Makak (10 km) and Minka (2 km).

=== Construction of the institution ===
The construction of the institution and its boarding school was funded by a grant of 15 million CFA francs from the French colonial administration. The land was provided by the local populations to the Société des missions évangéliques de Paris, which, along with the Presbyterian Church, divided the space equally for the construction of the church and the college and its boarding school.

=== First Cameroonian Elite ===
The inter-missionary college with a full cycle has long been one of the top secondary schools in Cameroon. The first batch of graduates in Cameroon came from this college, although some completed their education at Lycée Leclerc in Yaoundé. The play Trois prétendants...un mari, a classic of Cameroonian literature, was written by Guillaume Oyônô Mbia while he was at the Evangelical College of Libamba.

=== Notable alumni and associated personalities ===
- Guillaume Oyônô Mbia, writer, author of Trois prétendants...un mari which he wrote at the Evangelical College of Libamba

=== List of directors and enrollment ===
School Year	Director	Nationality	Enrollment	Boarders
1946-1960	Robert Pierce	American	200-400	120–150
1960-1975	André Ngwet	Cameroonian	300-700	300–400
1975-1990	Pierre Em Njok	Cameroonian	600-1000	400–600
1990-1994	Noé Nlend	Cameroonian	800-2000	500–700
1994-2001	Collegiate Direction	-	-	-
2001-2013	Thomas Noumba	Cameroonian	-	-
2013-...	Laurent Nyamb	Cameroonian	-	-
