= Alice Delphine Tang =

Cameroonian author and professor

- Education: Doctorate in Literature
- Occupations: Writer, professor
- Notable work: "Dom Juan in the Bassa language"; "Feminine Writing and African Tradition"; "The Challenge of the Composed Commentary"; "Cameroonian Literature since Reunification (1961–2011)"

Alice Delphine Tang is a Cameroonian writer. She holds a Doctorate in Literature and is a full-time professor at the University of Yaoundé 1 in Cameroon. She is also Secretary General of the University of Yaoundé II.

== Career ==
Tang is the author of several literary works, including: Dom Juan, written in the Bassa language; Feminine Writing and African Tradition; The Challenge of the Composed Commentary; Cameroonian Literature since Reunification (1961–2011).

She edited the collective work The Novels of Léonora Miano, which compiled approximately twenty contributions written by researchers based in Cameroon, France, Canada, the United States, and Ghana.

Dom Juan is a Bassa translation of Molière's play, prefaced by Emile Moselly Batamack.

Jacques Fame Ndongo, Literary Aesthetics is a work prefaced by Richard Laurent Omgba.

== Bibliography ==
=== Under her direction ===
The Fictional Work of Léonora Miano: Fiction, Memories, and Identity Issues (2014). Cameroonian Literature since Reunification (1961–2011): Mutations, Trends, and Perspectives, Alice Delphine Tang, Marie-Rose Abomo-Maurin, Edition l'Harmattan Cameroon, 2013.

=== As co-author ===
- Social Writings of Women in Francophonie, Alice Delphine Tang, Claire Etcherelli, Gabrielle Roy, Werewere Liking, Delphine Zanga Tsogo, Editions l'Harmattan Cameroon, 2017.
- Basa and Bulu Tales from Cameroon, Marie-Rose Abomo-Maurin, Alice Delphine Tang, Editions L'Harmattan, 2015.
- Black Earth and Afritude: Jacques Fame Ndongo and the Writing of a Poetics of Passion, Alice Delphine Tang, Marie-Rose Abomo-Maurin, 2015.
- Dom Juan in the Bassa language: A translation of Molière's play into the Bassa language, 2014.
- Jacques Fame Ndongo, Literary Aesthetics, Alice Delphine Tang, Marie-Rose Abomo-Maurin, Editions l'Harmattan Cameroon, Women and Power Collection, 2012.
- The Challenge of the Composed Commentary – Exams and Corrections from the Last Ten Years of the Cameroonian Baccalaureate, Editions l'Harmattan, Courses and Manuals Collection, 2011.

=== As author ===
- Feminine Writing and African Tradition: The Introduction of "Mbock Bassa" into the novelistic aesthetics of Werewere Liking, 2009.
- Dom Juan in the Bassa language. A translation of Molière's play into the Bassa language. (October 9, 2014.)
