= List of universities in the Turks and Caicos Islands =

This is a list of universities in the Turks and Caicos Islands.

== Universities ==
- Burkes University
- Charisma University
- Global University of Management and Technology
- St. Clements University
- Turks & Caicos Islands Community College
- University College of Providenciales (UCP)
- University of the West Indies - Turks and Caicos campus
