= Makak =

Town in Central province, Cameroon

Coordinates: 03°33′00″N 11°02′00″E

Makak is a town in central Cameroon, in Central province.

== Transport ==
It is served by a station on the national railway system.

== Education ==
- Evangelical College of Libamba (1945)

== See also ==
- Communes of Cameroon
- Railway stations in Cameroon
