= Kelly Mua Kingsly =

Cameroonian professor, finance engineer and author

- Born: 11 November 1977 (age 48); Wum, Cameroun
- Education: University of Dschang, Harvard University, Charisma University.
- Occupations: professor, finance engineer, author.
- Known for: Head of Finance Operations of the State in the Cameroon Ministry of Finance since 2016
- Website: kellykingsly.com

Kelly Mua Kingsly (born 11 November 1977) is a Cameroonian professor, finance engineer and author. He is the head of finance operations of the state in the Cameroon Ministry of Finance since 2016.

== Early life and education ==
Kingsly was born in Wum, Cameroun. He holds a BA in law from University of Dschang (2000). In 2016, he earned a Master of Public Administration (MPA) in Public Finance from Harvard University. In 2015, He earned a PhD in Public Policy and Business Management from Charisma University.

== Career ==
Kingsly has spent greater years of his career life in the fields of finance, public policy, and management. He served as Deputy Resident Representative with the United Nations and as a consultant with the African Development Bank. He is a founding fellow and board member of Quantum Blockchain Technology and Definer, the founder and board chair of Prima Finance and Investment; a digital micro merchant bank and lending platform.

Kingsly serves as the board director at African Trade and Investment Development Insurance (ATIDI). He is the censor at the Central Bank of Central African States (BEAC). He serves as the vice chair of the procurement and logistic committee for Africa Bureaux with UNDP. He is also the director of finance operations of the state, and designated representative of the Regional Advisory Commission on Financial Markets (COSUMAF).

Kingsly is an associate professor of financial forensics and audit, at Copperstone University, Zambia. He is a faculty and visiting professor at Harvard University, Charisma University, Leipzig University, and other institutions. He lectures on financial markets, public policy, management, and leadership. He has authored over twenty books and ninety-nine peer-reviewed articles.

== Awards and recognitions ==
- 2021 – IICFIP Leadership Excellence Award
- 2016 – Edward S. Mason Fellow at the Harvard Kennedy School of Government
- 2011 – Certified Forensic Finance Investigator
- 2012 – Certified Forensic Accountant (Institute of Forensic Accountants Canada)
