= Claude-Joseph M Bafou-Zetebeg =

Cameroonian writer, diplomat and former government minister

Claude-Joseph M’Bafou-Zetebeg
- Born: Claude-Joseph M’Bafou-Zetebeg; 14 September 1948 (age 78); Dschang, Cameroon
- Occupations: Writer, diplomat, civil administrator
- Years active: 1970s–present
- Known for: Literary works and diplomatic service
- Notable work: La Couronne d'épines (1973), L’Oiseau en liberté (2001)

Claude-Joseph M’Bafou-Zetebeg (born 14 September 1948), is a Cameroonian writer, diplomat, and senior civil administrator. He is known for his literary contributions to Cameroonian literature as well as his service in government and diplomacy, including his tenure as Ambassador of Cameroon to Algeria.

== Early life and education ==
Claude-Joseph M’Bafou-Zetebeg was born on 14 September 1948 in Dschang, in western Cameroon. He pursued higher education in law and public administration in Cameroon and abroad, including training in administrative sciences in France.

== Administrative and political career ==
M’Bafou-Zetebeg held several positions within the Cameroonian government. He served as a technical adviser at the Presidency of the Republic in the 1990s before being appointed Minister of Urban Affairs in 1997, a position he held until 2002.

He later pursued a diplomatic career and was appointed Ambassador Extraordinary and Plenipotentiary of Cameroon to Algeria, where he served for over a decade.

During his diplomatic tenure, he represented Cameroon in international forums and commented on African peace and security issues, notably praising Algeria’s role in regional stability.

He also reacted to international events involving Cameroonian nationals abroad, including public statements as ambassador.

== Literary career ==
Alongside his administrative and diplomatic work, M’Bafou-Zetebeg has had a significant literary career, particularly in poetry and drama.

=== Notable works ===
- La Couronne d'épines (1973), a poetry collection and his first published work
- Le Martyr du Bouganda (1976), a theatrical work
- Perles sanglantes (1980)
- L’Oiseau en liberté (2001), a poetic work reflecting themes of freedom and identity

His literary production places him among Cameroonian authors who have contributed to post-independence African literature.

Bibliographic records of his works are also preserved in international rare book and archival catalogues.

M’Bafou-Zetebeg’s works explore themes such as political struggle and governance, human suffering and resilience, and freedom and identity. They reflect both his literary sensibility and his experience within state institutions.

== Legacy ==
Claude-Joseph M’Bafou-Zetebeg is regarded as part of a generation of Cameroonian intellectuals who bridged literature and public service. His dual career as a writer and statesman contributes to his recognition in both cultural and political spheres.

== See also ==
- Literature of Cameroon
- Politics of Cameroon
- Diplomacy in Africa
