= John Nkemngong Nkengasong =

Cameroonian author (1959–2023)

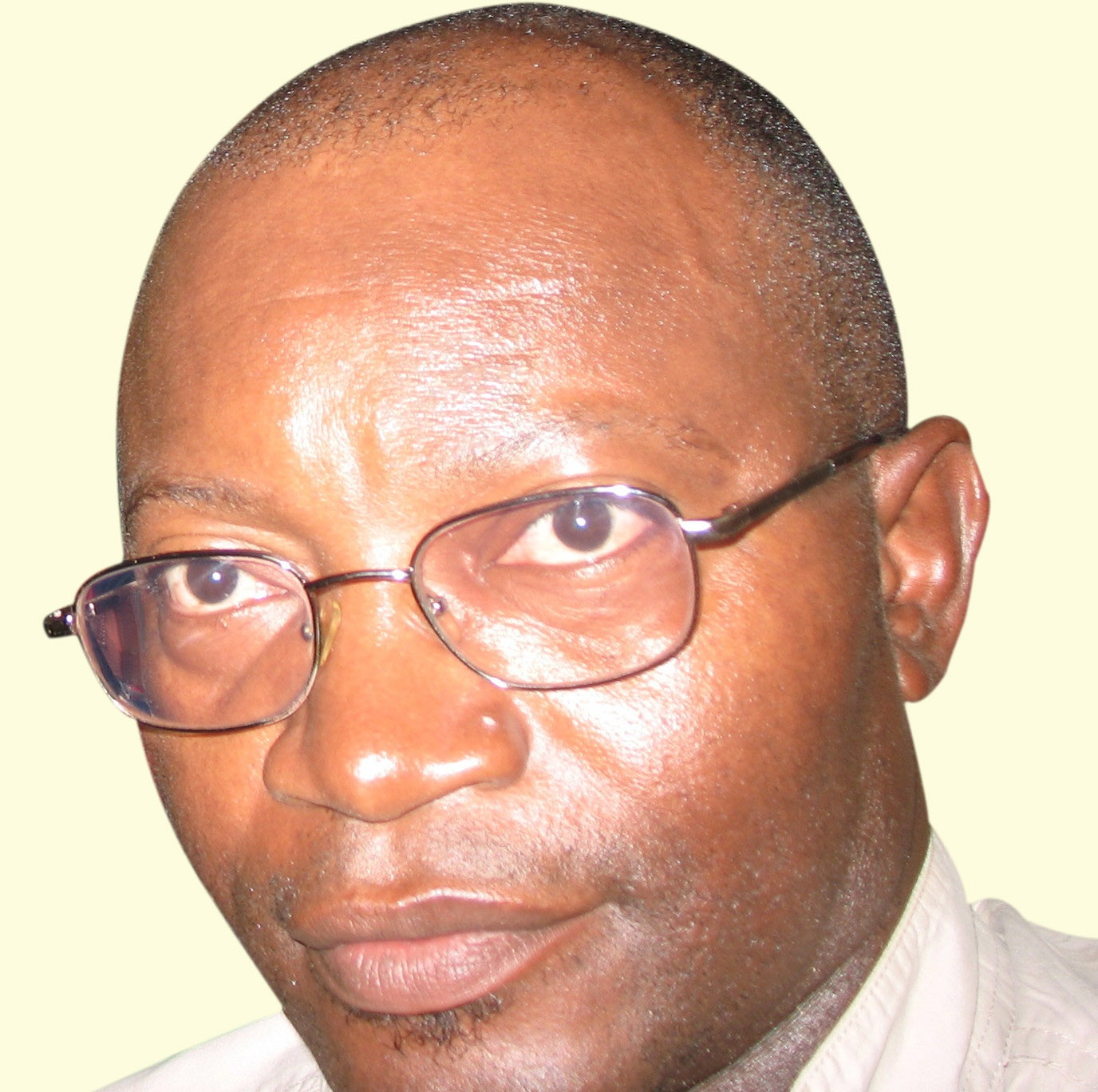
- Nkengasong in 2006
- Born: 1959; Lewoh, British Cameroon
- Died: 11 June 2023 (aged 64)
- Education: Seat of Wisdom College Fontem, University of Yaounde 1
- Occupations: Writer, professor
- Spouse: Efuet Awung Walburga
- Children: Marion Nkengasong Nkengasong and Etienndem Njilife Nkengasong
- Writing career
- Genres: Novels, Plays, Poetry and non-fiction
- Notable awards: “Honorary Fellow in Writing”, University of Iowa 2008 "EkoPrize for Literature" 2013 "Knight of the Cameroon Order of Valour" 2016

John Ngosong Nkemngong Nkengasong (1959 – 11 June 2023) was a Cameroonian playwright, novelist, poet and scholar. He was often referred to as a "radical visionary" of Anglophone Cameroon and an “ardent upholder of innovative creativity and crusader for the truth” as is demonstrated by his novels, poetry, short stories but most notably his plays.

== Biography ==
Nkengasong spent part of his early childhood in his native Lewoh, a polity within the larger Nweh tribe of the Lebialem Division of the Southwest Region of Cameroon. The countryside's craggy and verdant scenery and its splendid culture are richly represented in his writing.

In 1971 he completed primary school and enrolled in Our Lady Seat of Wisdom College Fontem. At that formative age, he became conscious of the centrality of literary creativity in human experience and he began writing poems some of which were published in the college magazine. After graduating from High School, he read English at the then University of Yaounde, specializing in English Literature while taking elective courses in Theatre Arts. Between 1979 and 1982, the years of his undergraduate studies, he wrote poems some of which were published in The Mould, a journal of creative writing founded by Bole Butake and in The New Horizons, another journal of creative and critical writing founded by Tala Kashim Ibrahim. With a Bachelor of Arts degree in English obtained in 1982, he registered in the second cycle of the Higher Teacher Training College, University of Yaounde, graduating in 1984 as a High School teacher. While he taught in High School, he pursued graduate studies, earning a “Maitrise” in 1985 and in 1993, a “Doctorat de Troisième Cycle” degree from the University of Yaounde. He was recruited as an Assistant Lecturer at the University of Yaounde 1 in 2000, and in 2004 he obtained a PhD in English Literary Studies. The university offered him fertile grounds to explore his burgeoning creative talents, leading to the publication of several plays, prose works, poetry and essays which have sought for him national as well as international acclaim.

Before his demise, he was a professor of Literature and Cultural Studies at the University of Yaounde 1 and also the Head Of Department ¨HOD¨ in the University Of Buea in the South West region of Cameroon. Apart from his creative works, he published extensively on African Literature and Culture, British and Postcolonial Literatures and Cameroonian Pidgin.

Nkengasong died on 11 June 2023, at the age of 64.

== Writings ==
A prolific author and critic, Nkengasong wrote works which traverse genres and disciplines. His creative imagination was inspired by his native Nweh culture and the multicultural, social and political complexity of Cameroon, particularly defined by the country's history and multiple colonial heritages. According to Shadrach, his works, notably his plays, are innovative, postmodern and at times radically absurd in form and content. They focus essentially on the interrelations of history, nation and culture in Africa and are presented in style that “transcend[s] the fluid demarcations of theoretical dogmas”.

Black Caps and Red Feathers (2001) is his first major publication which gave signals to what would later be considered as an enriching career. The play is “a remarkable two-act play that constitutes the author's individual insight into the human condition”. It is notable for its absurdist structure and content as well as its experiments in surrealist techniques.

His debut novel and best known work, Across the Mongolo, was published in 2004. Besides its rich cultural context, it is a subtle expression of the angst against the humiliation and subjugation of minority peoples in Africa who are the victims of colonial geopolitics. He also wrote poetry which is published in a collection entitled, Letters to Marion (And the Coming Generations) published in 2009. The poetry is “built on humour, irony and bestial imagery” and handles a wide range of issues including “Africa's affliction ... the petty squabbles that have transformed contemporary Africa into a battlefield”.

His writings have taken him to many parts of the world. Notably, he was a Writer-in-Residence in the International Writing Program (IWP) at the University of Iowa. He has been guest writer at Corpus Christi College, Oxford, New York University, Chicago Humanities Festival, Howard University, the National University of Singapore, and the University of Augsburg, among others.

In February 2018, he was awarded the prestigious Rockefeller Foundation Bellagio Center fellowship in Italy, for academic writing.

== Awards ==
- 2008 "Honorary Fellow in Writing" awarded by the University of Iowa
- 2013 "Eko Prize for Literature"
- 2016 "Knight of the Cameroon Order of Valour".

== Select bibliography ==
=== Fiction ===
- God was African . Langaa RPCIG, 2015.
- Achakasara. NMI Education, 2011.
- The Widow's Might. Editions CLE, 2006.
- Across the Mongolo. Spectrum Books Limited, 2004.
- “Kakamba” in The Spirit Machine and other Stories. CCC Press, 20

=== Drama ===
- A Madding Generation. Miraclaire Publishing, 2012.
- Njogobi Festival Miraclaire Publishing, 2011.
- Ancestral Earth. Langaa RPCIG, 2010.
- The Call of Blood . Langaa RPCIG, 2010.
- Black Caps and Red Feathers . Patron Publishing House, 2001.

=== Poetry ===
- Letters to Marion (And the Coming Generations) Langaa RPCIG, 2009.
- "Ghost Towns" and other poems in Journal of New Poetry 4. The International Research Confederacy of African Literature and Culture, Lulu inc., 2007.

=== Selected non-fiction ===
- John Nkemngong Nkengasong: The Naked Muse: Echoes from a Writer's Soul. International Writing Program Archive of Resident's Work, 17 October 2008

== See also ==
- Imbolo Mbue
- Literature of Cameroon
- Nsah Mala
