= Hubert Mono Ndjana =

Cameroonian academic and philosopher (1946–2023)

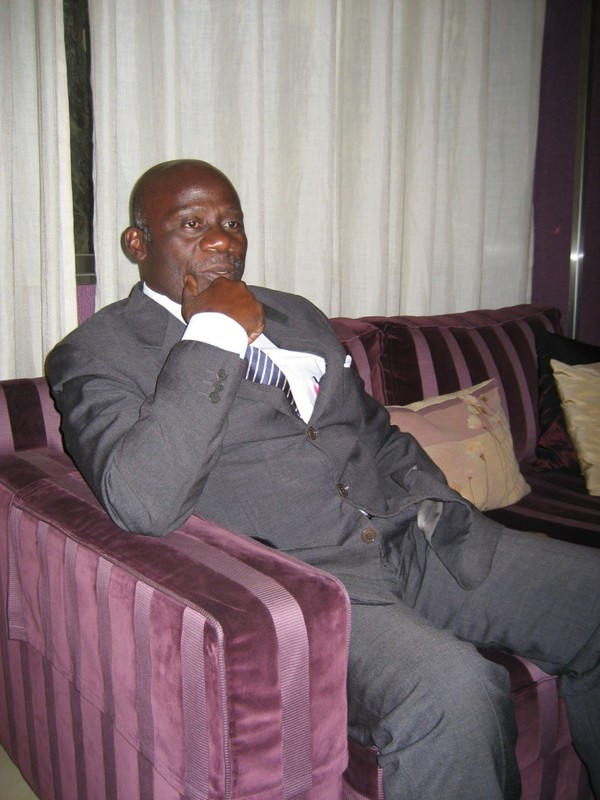
- Ndjana in 2006
- Born: 3 November 1946; Ekabita, Lekié, French Cameroon
- Died: 16 November 2023 (aged 77); Yaoundé, Cameroon
- Education: University of Tours; Academy of Sciences of the Democratic People's Republic of Korea
- Occupations: Professor philosopher

Hubert Mono Ndjana (3 November 1946 – 16 November 2023) was a Cameroonian academic and philosopher. Additionally, he was a writer, publishing numerous books on political leaders.

== Biography ==
Born in Ekabita on 3 November 1946, Ndjana studied in Cameroon and in France at the University of Tours. Back home, he held various positions in academia. He also tried his hand at politics, in which he was unsuccessful. He was one of the first intellectuals in Cameroon to support President Paul Biya, who came to power in 1982. During the beginning of Cameroon's multiparty political system in the 1990s, he became deputy secretary-general of the Cameroon People's Democratic Movement, the ruling party led by Biya. In 1990, he published a doctoral thesis at the Academy of Sciences of the Democratic People's Republic of Korea.

On 5 February 2003, Ndjana became the first Cameroonian to obtain a philosophical degree and headed the philosophy department at the University of Yaoundé I. In 2016, he was president of the jury for the Grand Prix of Literary Associations. After his retirement from the university, he continued to teach domestically and internationally.

Hubert Mono Ndjana died in Yaoundé on 16 November 2023, at the age of 77, following a traffic accident.

== Publications ==
=== Philosophical works ===
- Paradoxes. Essai sur les contradictions du sens commun (1981)
- La philosophie en raccourci (1981)
- Considérations actuelles sur l’Afrique (1983)
- L'idée sociale chez Paul BIYA (1985)
- De l'ethnofascisme dans la l'ittérature politique camerounaise (1987)
- Pour comprendre le libéralisme communautaire de Paul BIYA (1988)
- Révolution et création. Essai sur la philosophie du Djoutché (1988)
- L’écume des tontines. Dissertation sur la crise économique et sociale (1993)
- Les proverbes de Paul BIYA (1997)
- A la tombée du jour. Problématique, théorie et pratique de la philosophie africaine (2000)
- Beauté et vertu du Savoir. Esquisse d'une épisteméthique (1999)
- L’Essentiel (Quand on a tout oublié) (2006)
- Histoire de la philosophie africaine (2009)
- Panorama la philosophie camerounaise (2014)

=== Literature ===
- Echec et chèque (1974)
- Vice versa (1975)
- La revenante (1980)
- Onambele et Magaptche (2002)
- Les gosses endiablés
- Un détournement
- Regard sur, pays mystérieux de l’Orient
- La prisonnière
- Les Vampires du Godstank (2006)
