= Grand Prix of Literary Associations =

Awards for authors and literary associations

Grand Prix of Literary Associations (GPLA)
- Awarded for: International Awards for Authors and Literary Associations. Open to three Languages : English, Spanish and French
- Country: Cameroon
- Presented by: GPLA Team
- First award: 2013

The Grand Prix of Literary Associations (GPLA) were launched in 2013 in Cameroon, in partnership with Brasseries du Cameroun and sponsorship by Castel Beer.

The GPLA are defined as bilingual English-and-French literary prizes, some being awarded on the proposals of literary associations, especially in the Research and Belles-Lettres categories.

The contest is open worldwide, both to authors and to literary associations that propose their works to the Jury. In the 2016 edition (GPLA 2016), more than one hundred works were submitted to the Jury by the endorsement of 69 associations from diverse countries across the world. The shortlist was made up of nine works, three of them being from Cameroon, two from Nigeria, and four respectively from France / Morocco, Côte d'Ivoire, Senegal and Chad.

Since the launch of the 2017 edition, books written in Spanish are also eligible to compete, alongside those in French and English that were formerly exclusively allowed. Among the 124 works registered for the pre-selections of the GPLA 2017, 16 books came from Spanish-speaking countries, and one of them was eventually awarded in the Research category.

The prize also welcomes books written in African languages. In the 2018 edition, a work written in Kikongo made the shortlist.

== The concept ==
According to the GPLA regulations, the Research and Belles-Lettres categories are open to recent works, published in the 18 months before the launch of each edition. Books have to be commended to the Jury by literary associations, or any cultural club active in literature. The Presort Commission readers, some from the GPLA team and others from the two associations awarded in the previous edition, read the pre-selected works and submit a shortlist to the jury. The Jury consists of at least nine members, in charge of designating two winners, one from the Research category and the other from the Belles-Lettres. An author regularly competing for those prizes can be awarded three times, but a laureate cannot apply in the edition following his consecration. Another rule of the GPLA is that books self-published by their own authors, without any publishing house label, are allowed; the only condition being that they should be endorsed by literary associations.

== Other GPLA prizes ==
In addition to the prizes awarded in the Research and Belles-Lettres categories, there is a Memory Grand Prix (Grand prix de la mémoire), awarded posthumously to an icon of literature; a Grand Prix des Mécènes is awarded to honour a writer's entire body of work; and the Asso-Prize recognizes the will and endeavours of an association for promoting literature.

In the year 2017, two other related GPLA awards were introduced: the Tam-tam Short Story Prize, and the Prix Nnanga Kon.

== Rewards ==
The GPLA attributes a reward of about 1,000 US dollars and a more expensive media promotion for awarded authors and works. Many literary activities are also organized upon the awarded works, such as the GPLA Essay Contest (Concours de Dissertation-GPAL), the GPLA Student Day (Journée de l’Etudiant-GPAL), just to name a few of them.

== Report on the winners’ designation procedures ==
The GPLA Report on the winners’ designation procedures is a document published for every edition two or three years after its awards ceremony. The report aims to show transparency on GPLA methods and thus prevent any controversy around the laureates, but also to reinforce the reputation of objectivity that emerges from the contest.

== The Laureates ==
GPLA 2013

- President of the Jury: Guillaume Oyônô Mbia
- Winner in the Research Category: Magloire Ondoa, awarded for his work entitled Textes et Documents du Cameroun (1815–2012), endorsed by Club Kwame Nkrumah.
- Winner in the Belles-Lettres Category: Eric Mendi, awarded for his work entitled Opération Obama, endorsed by Lire des merveilles.
- Winner of Grand prix de la mémoire: Francis Bebey (1929–2001)

GPLA 2014

- President of the Jury: Adamou Ndam Njoya
- Winner in the Research Category: Hermine Kembo, awarded for her work entitled Le système africain de protection des droits de l’homme, endorsed by UNIJEAPAJ.
- Winner in the Belles-Lettres Category: Charles Salé, awarded for his work entitled La’afal. Ils ont dit..., endorsed by Grenier Littéraire.
- Winner of Grand prix de la mémoire: Tchicaya U Tam'Si (1931–1988)
- Grand Prix des Mécènes: Guillaume Oyônô Mbia
- Asso-Prize: Compagnie Feugham

GPLA 2015

- President of the Jury: Claude Njikè Bergeret
- Winner in the Research Category: Jacques Fame Ndongo, awarded for his work entitled Essai sur la sémiotique d’une civilisation en mutation, endorsed by Club Unesco de l’Université de Douala.
- Winner in the Belles-Lettres Category: Fiston Mwanza Mujila, awarded for his work entitled Tram 83, endorsed by Asprobir France.
- Winner of Grand prix de la mémoire: Cheikh Anta Diop (1923–1986)
- Grand Prix des Mécènes: Patrice Kayo
- Asso-Prize: Grenier Littéraire

GPLA 2016

- President of the Jury: Hubert Mono Ndjana
- Winner in the Research Category: Felwine Sarr, awarded for his work entitled Afrotopia, endorsed by CLIJEC.
- Winner in the Belles-Lettres Category: Eric Mendi, awarded for his work entitled AFANE – Forêt Equatoriale, endorsed by Maison de la culture Québec – Cameroun.
- Winner of Grand prix de la mémoire: Sankie Maimo (1930–2013)
- Grand Prix des Mécènes: Bernard Dadié
- Asso-Prize: Association Gangotena (Toulon – France)

GPLA 2017

- President of the Jury: Ebénézer Njoh-Mouellé
- Winner in the Research Category: Ebénézer Billé and Georges Moukouti, awarded for their co-authored Spanish-written work, entitled Hispanoamérica: visión contemporánea, endorsed by El Calidoscopio (Mexico, Baja California Sur)
- Winner in the Belles-Lettres Category: Macaire Etty, awarded for his work entitled La geste de Bréké, endorsed by AECI (Association des Écrivains de Côte d'Ivoire)
- Winner of Grand prix de la mémoire: William Edward Burghardt Du Bois, also known as WEB DU BOIS (1868–1963)
- Grand Prix des Mécènes: Seydou Badian Kouyaté
- Asso-Prize: Maison de la Culture Québec-Cameroun

GPLA 2018

- President of the Jury: Patrice Kayo
- Winner in the Research Category: Helen Lackner, awarded for her work entitled Yemen in Crisis, endorsed by Middle East Studies Association (United States)
- Winner in the Belles-Lettres Category: Yasmina Khadra, awarded for his novel entitled Khalil, endorsed by Association Culturelle La Grande Maison de Tlemcen (Algeria)
- Winner of Grand prix de la mémoire: Jean-Marc Ela (1936–2008)
- Grand Prix des mécènes: Ngũgĩ wa Thiong’o
- Asso-Prize: El Calidoscopio (Mexico)

GPLA 2019

- President of the Jury: J. Shenga
- Winner in the Research Category: Victor Julius Ngoh, awarded for his work entitled Cameroon: 1884 – Present, endorsed by ORES (Organization of Rural Education Simplicity)
- Winner in the Belles-Lettres Category: Namwali Serpell, awarded for her novel entitled The Old Drift, endorsed by Spirit of Book
- Winner of Grand prix de la mémoire: Chinua Achebe (1930–2013)
- Grand Prix des mécènes: Cheikh Hamidou Kane
- Asso-Prize: Colectivo Cultural Iniciativa Poética (Mexico)

GPLA 2022

- President of jury:Pierre Bau
- Winner grand prix Nétonon Noël Ndjékéry

GPLA 2023

- The winner is awarded on the 16th of March 2024

== See also ==
- Literature of Cameroon
- African literature
- List of literary awards
