= Jean-Louis Njemba Medu =

Cameroonian writer (1902–1966)

Jean-Louis Njemba Medu (1902–1966) was a Cameroonian writer. He is regarded as a pioneer of the African novel, having published the science fiction/fantasy novel Nnanga Kon in 1932 in his native Bulu language. The story deals with the encounter between the Bulu tribe and a white missionary; the title literally means "white ghosts" or "phantom albinos" in Bulu.

More than 30 years after the author's death, the novel was translated into French by Jacques Fame Ndongo, and published by Sopecam publishers of Yaoundé in 1989.

== Early life and career ==
Jean-Louis Njemba Medou was a teacher with the missionaries of The American Presbyterian Church installed in Ebolowa (southern Cameroun). He then became a civil servant, working with the Public Education system and often occupied the position of school principal.Assigned to the Education department, he was sent in 1952 to the École normale supérieure de Saint-Cloud (France) for a teaching internship. After a traffic accident in 1957, no longer being able to keep the standing required by the teaching profession for a long time, he changed his profession. He was appointed Administrative Secretary in 1964. He ended his career as second deputy prefect at Bafia. He died from hypertension and exhaustion on January 22, 1966.

== Publications ==
Nnanga Kon: premier roman écrit par un Camerounais

A rewriting in a poetic novel by Rachel Efoua Zengue in a bilingual version (EFOUA ZENGUE, Rachel, 2005).

== Recognition ==
- The Margaret Wrong Prize for African Literature (London 1932)

== See also ==
Ferdinand Oyono Mongo Beti, Jacques Fame Ndongo, Francis Bebey
