= Nsah Mala =

Cameroonian poet, writer, author, and literary researcher

- Born: Kenneth Toah Nsah; 10 September 1988 (age 38); Mbesa, Cameroon
- Education: Université Jean Moulin Lyon 3; University of Yaoundé I; University of Perpignan Via Domitia; University of St Andrews; Universidad de Santiago de Compostela; Aarhus University
- Occupations: Poet, writer, children's author, literary scholar, transdisciplinary researcher, futurist and foresight practitioner
- Writing career
- Genres: Poetry, short fiction, children's literature
- Notable works: Constimocrazy: Malafricanising Democracy, Bites of Insanity, Les Pleurs du mal

Nsah Mala (born Kenneth Toah Nsah) is a Cameroonian poet, writer, author of children's books, researcher-scholar, futurist and foresight practitioner, working in the domains of arts, literature and cultural studies, environmental humanities, sustainability science, foresight and futures thinking, anticipatory governance and future generations. As a poet-writer and scholar, he writes in English, French, and Iteanghe-a-Mbesa (Mbesa language).

== Early life and education ==
Born in Mbesa (also Mbessa), Nsah Mala did his primary education in CBC School Mbesa.

He wrote his first play in Form Two in Government Secondary School (GSS) Mbessa, and obtained his General Certificate of Education (GCE) Ordinary Level in 2007. He did high-school education in CCAST Bambili, where he obtained his GCE Advanced Level in 2009, emerging as the national overall best candidate in Literature in English, which earned him an award from the Cameroon Association of English-Speaking Journalists (CAMASEJ).

In 2012, he graduated from École Normale Supérieure (ENS) de Yaoundé and University of Yaoundé I. From 2016 to 2018, with an Erasmus Mundus Scholarship, he studied for the Erasmus Mundus Master's Crossways in Cultural Narratives at the University of Perpignan Via Domitia (France), University of St Andrews (UK), and Universidad de Santiago de Compostela (Spain).

In September 2018, he enrolled in a PhD programme in Comparative Literature at Aarhus University (Denmark). On 11 March 2022, he successfully defended his PhD dissertation entitled: "Can Literature Save the Congo Basin? Postcolonial Ecocriticism and Environmental Literary Activism". His dissertation had been co-supervised by Professor Mads Rosendahl Thomsen, Comparative Literature Department, and Associate Professor Peter Mortensen, English Department, both at Aarhus University. Nsah's doctoral assessment committee consisted of Professor Scott Slovic, English Department, University of Idaho (USA), Associate Professor Étienne-Marie Lassi, French Department, University of Manitoba (Canada), and Associate Professor Marianne Ping Huang, Comparative Literature, Aarhus University (Committee Chair). Nsah's doctoral thesis won the Prix de thèses francophones en Prospective 2022 (Prize for Francophone Theses in Foresight and Futures Studies) from la Fondation 2100 and l'Agence Universitaire de la Francophonie (AUF). In 2023, Nsah obtained the competitive qualification as associate professor in Anglophone Studies (known in French as qualification aux fonctions de maître de conférences en section 11 Études anglophones) from the Conseil national des universités (CNU) in France. From 2025 to 2026, he studied at the Université Jean Moulin Lyon 3 where he obtained a Master's in International Relations and Diplomacy (Master 2 Relations Internationales et Diplomatie).

Nsah won the Next Generation Foresight Practitioner (NGFP) Fellowship (Judges' Choice) from the School of International Futures (SOIF) in 2023 for a project on the futures of the Congo Basin. The Congo Basin Futures (#CongoBasinFutures), including #RoyalAnimalsFutures, participatory foresight project went on to win the inaugural edition of the Dubai Foresight Awards in the Foresight for the Planet category in 2025.

After working as postdoctoral researcher at Radboud University (Netherlands), Nsah was recruited as a postdoctoral teaching and research fellow at Université de Lille (France). Nsah Mala was selected as a 2023 Next Generation Foresight Practitioner (NGFP) Fellow at the School of International Futures in the United Kingdom for a project on the Congo Basin. Nsah works for the UNESCO-MOST BRIDGES Coalition as the Coordinator of the Hub for Planetary Wellbeing at the University of Cologne (Germany). He is also the chairperson of the Indigenous Kingdom of Mbessa Commission for Future Generations and Sustainability.

== Writing career ==
Nsah Mala wrote his first play in the second year (Form Two) of secondary education at GSS Mbessa. He published his first poetry collection, entitled Chaining Freedom, in 2012 and went on to publish three other poetry collections in English and one in French. He has published three picture books in Cameroon and France, while his poems and stories appear in magazines and anthologies.

Constimocrazy: Malafricanising Democracy (2017), his fourth poetry collection, received reviews. Nelson Mlambo described it in Tuck Magazine as "a profound expression of Afro-talent and the personification of an Afropolitan voice." Global Arts and Politics Alliance (GAPA) observed that Nsah Mala "reminds despots that they are a minority and they thrive on using the masses to gain popularity and benefit from power".

In 2016, Nsah Mala's short story "Christmas Disappointment" was one of the ten winners of a competition organised by the Cameroonian Ministry of Arts and Culture. In December 2016, his short story "Fanta from America" received a special mention in a competition organised by Bakwa Magazine in Cameroon. His French poem "Servants de l'État" received a "mention spéciale du concours littéraire Malraux" (France) in December 2017. He attended the Caine Prize Writers' Workshop in Gisenyi, Rwanda, in March 2018.

In summer 2020, POW! Kids Books acquired world rights (excluding Africa) to Nsah Mala's North American debut picture book entitled What the Moon Cooks for publication in spring 2021.

Nsah Mala was the Judge for the Africa Region for the Commonwealth Short Story Prize in 2025, alongside Vilsoni Hereniko (Chair), Saras Manickam (Asia Region), Anita Sethi (Europe and Canada Region), Lisa Allen-Agostini (Caribbean Region), and Apirana Taylor (Pacific Region).

== Awards and distinctions ==
- 2025: Winner of the inaugural edition of the Dubai Foresight Awards in the Foresight for the Planet category, from the Dubai Future Foundation, for his participatory foresight project called Congo Basin Futures (#CongoBasinFutures)
- 2025: Judge for the Africa Region in the Commonwealth Short Story Prize.
- 2023: Next Generation Foresight Practitioner (NGFP) Fellowship (Judges' Choice), from the School of International Futures (SOIF).
- 2022: Prix de thèses francophones en Prospective (Prize for Francophone Theses in Foresight and Futures Studies) from Agence Universitaire de la Francophonie (AUF) and Fondation 2100 (France).
- 2018: Alumnus of the Caine Prize Writers' Workshop in Gisenyi, Rwanda, and contributor to Redemption Song and Other Stories, the 2018 Caine Prize Anthology.
- 2017: Special Mention du Prix Littéraire Malraux.org (France) for a poem in French entitled "Servants de l'État".
- 2016: Winner of the National Literary Prize for Short Stories, from the Cameroonian Ministry of Arts and Culture, for his story "Christmas Disappointment".
- 2016: Special Mention in a short story contest organised by Bakwa Magazine in Cameroon, for his short story "Fanta from America".
- 2010: Cameroon Association of English-Speaking Journalists (CAMASEJ) Excellence Prize for the National Overall Best Student in Literature in English in the General Certificate of Education (GCE) Advanced Level.

== Publications ==
=== Poetry collections ===
- (fr) Les Pleurs du mal, 2019, ISBN 978-1942876465
- (en) Constimocrazy: Malafricanising Democracy, 2017, ISBN 978-0998847665
- (en) If You Must Fall Bush, 2016, ISBN 978-9956763856
- (en) Bites of Insanity, 2015, ISBN 978-9956792672
- (en) Chaining Freedom, 2012, ISBN 978-0615692852

=== Children's books ===
- (en) Explore Animal Sounds with Little Nain (NMI-Education, 2022)
- (en) Andolo: the Talented Albino, 2020, ISBN 978-978-956-124-7
- (fr) Andolo: l'albinos talentueux, 2020, ISBN 978-978-956-139-1
- (fr) Le petit Gabriel commence à lire, 2020, ISBN 978-2368686621
- (en) Little Gabriel Starts to Read, 2020, ISBN 978-1-942876-71-7

=== Edited books ===
- Congo Basin Poetry Anthology - Anthologie poétique du Bassin du Congo, 2026, ISBN 9781957296968
- (co-edited with Nicki Hitchcott) Ecotexts in the Postcolonial Francosphere, 2025, doi:10.3828/9781836243144 ISBN 978-1-83624-314-4
- (co-edited with Chinonye C. Ekwueme-Ugwu and Joyce Onoromhenre Agofure) Fresh Ecocritical Voices in African Literatures and Cultures, 2025, ISBN 978-1-957296-64-7
- (co-edited with Mbizo Chirasha) Corpses of Unity – Cadavres de l'unité, 2020, ISBN 978-9966133991
- (co-edited with Tendai Rinos Mwanaka) Best New African Poets 2019 Anthology, 2020, ISBN 978-1779296108
- (co-edited with Tendai Rinos Mwanaka) Best New African Poets 2018 Anthology, 2018, ISBN 978-1779063601

=== Short fiction ===
- "Departure", Redemption Song and Other Stories, Caine Prize Anthology, 2018, ISBN 978-1623719708
- "America at Midnight", Kalahari Review, 2017
- "Stubborn Miniskirt", PAROUSIA Magazine, 2017

=== Essays ===
- "Cameroon’s sacred and royal animals: could literature and futures thinking help save them?" The Conversation, Africa.
- "Animaux sacrés et royaux du Cameroun : la littérature et la prospective peuvent‑elles les sauver ?" The Conversation, Africa.
- "Participatory Practices and the Futures of Cameroon's Indigenous Baka People", On Policy Africa Magazine.
- "La France et le Pacte pour l'avenir de l'ONU: un rendez-vous manqué pour les générations futures?" The Conversation, France.
- "'A healthy earth may be ugly': How literary art can help us value insect conservation", The Conversation, France.
- "African Union: Climate Action Offers Organisation Unique Chance for Revival", The Conversation, France.
- "L'action climatique peut-elle redorer l'image de l'Union africaine?", The Conversation, France.
- "Vanishing Insects & Dying Earth: Reflecting on Insects & Soil in Mbessa (Cameroon)", GeoSemantics in ASAP/Journal, 2023.
- "There is no such thing as African literature", Kalahari Review, 2023.
- "Literature from the Congo Basin offers ways to address the climate crisis", The Conversation, 2022.
- "The virality of letters: the Covid-19 literary archive keeps growing", Corona Times, 2020.
- "Alleged corruption in academic appointments highlights Cameroon's PhD glut", Times Higher Education, 2020.
- "Comment expliquer la timide mobilisation de la jeunesse africaine pour le climat?" The Conversation, 2019.

=== Peer-reviewed articles and book chapters ===
- Nsah, K. T. (2026). The Futures of Royal Animals in Cameroon’s Grassfields: From Literary Imagination to Participatory Foresight. World Futures Review, 0(0). https://doi.org/10.1177/19467567261434197
- Muñoz-Martínez, Ysabel, Hu, Jueling, Mala, Nsah, & Lundberg, Anita. 2025. "Tropical Futurisms: Thinking Futures". eTropic: Electronic Journal of Studies in the Tropics, 24(1), 1–25. https://doi.org/10.25120/etropic.24.1.2025.4197
- Nsah, Kenneth Toah. 2023. "Conserving Africa's Eden? Green Colonialism, Neoliberal Capitalism, and Sustainable Development in Congo Basin Literature". Humanities 12(3): 38. DOI: https://doi.org/10.3390/h12030038
- Nsah, Kenneth Toah. 2023. "Our Children Will Fight for the Climate: How Congo-Basin Writers Prophesied the Global Youth Climate Movement". Electronic Green Journal 48(2023). URL: https://escholarship.org/uc/item/88n2v0wv
- Nsah, Kenneth Toah. 2021. "The Ecopolitics of Water Pollution and Disorderly Urbanization in Congo-Basin Plays". Orbis Litterarum.
- Nsah, Kenneth Toah. 2021. "The Return of Bush Fallers: Cameroon Anglophone Fiction Responds to Clandestine Immigration". Postcolonial Text, vol. 1, no. 1, pp. 1–24.
- Nsah, Kenneth Toah. 2020. "Of Dogs, Horses and Buffalos in Cameroon: Companion Animals in Cameroonian Fiction". In Reading Cats and Dogs: Companion Animals in World Literature, eds. F. Besson et al. Lanham: Lexington Books, pp. 169–188. {{ISBN<978-1-7936-1106-2}}.
- Nsah, Kenneth Toah. 2020. "When Trees Scream". DRAMA – Nordic Drama Pedagogical Journal.
- Nsah, Kenneth Toah: 2019. "The Screaming Forest: An Ecocritical Assessment of Le Cri de la forêt". Ecological In(ter)ventions in the Francophone World, eds. Anne-Rachel Hermetet and Stephanie Posthumus, special issue of Ecozon@: European Journal of Literature, Culture and Environment, vol. 10, no. 2, pp. 58–75.
- Nsah, Kenneth Toah. 2018. "'No Forest, No Water. No Forest, No Animals': An Ecocritical Reading of Ekpe Inyang's The Hill Barbers". Ecozon@: European Journal of Literature, Culture and Environment, vol. 9, no. 1, pp. 94–110.
- Nsah, Kenneth Toah. 2017. "Triple Marginality in Cameroon Anglophone Literature". In Rewriting Pasts, Imagining Futures: Critical Explorations of Contemporary African Fiction and Theatre, eds. Victor Gomia and Gilbert Ndi. Colorado: Spears Media Press, pp. 96–110. ISBN 978-1942876182.
- Nsah, Kenneth Toah. 2016. "Cameroon Professors Publish: A Reply to Nwanatifu Nwaco's 'Cameroon: Professors without Publications'". Voice of Research, vol. 5, no. 2, pp. 53–59.
- Nsah, Kenneth Toah. 2016. "La métamorphose chez Kafka et Darriussecq: Une étude compare". Cahiers ivoiriens d’études comparées, vol. 7, pp. 33–52.
- Nsah, Kenneth Toah. 2015. "Eco-cultural Sensitivity in John Nkengasong's Njogobi Festival and Nol Alembong's Forest Echoes". Journal of English Language, Literature and Culture (JELLiC), vol. 4, no. 1, pp. 37–58. ISBN 978-1523331598.
- Nsah, Kenneth Toah. 2015. "Black Prophesies on White Soils and Ears: A Reading of Joyce Ashuntantang's 'The Clairvoyant'".Modern Research Studies, vol. 2 no. 3, pp. 502–514.

== See also ==
- Bernard Fonlon
- Bate Bessong
- Mongo Beti
- Imbolo Mbue
- John Nkemngong Nkengasong
- Patrice Nganang
- Joyce Ashuntantang
- Mbesa
- Mbessa
