= Kidi Bebey =

French journalist and author

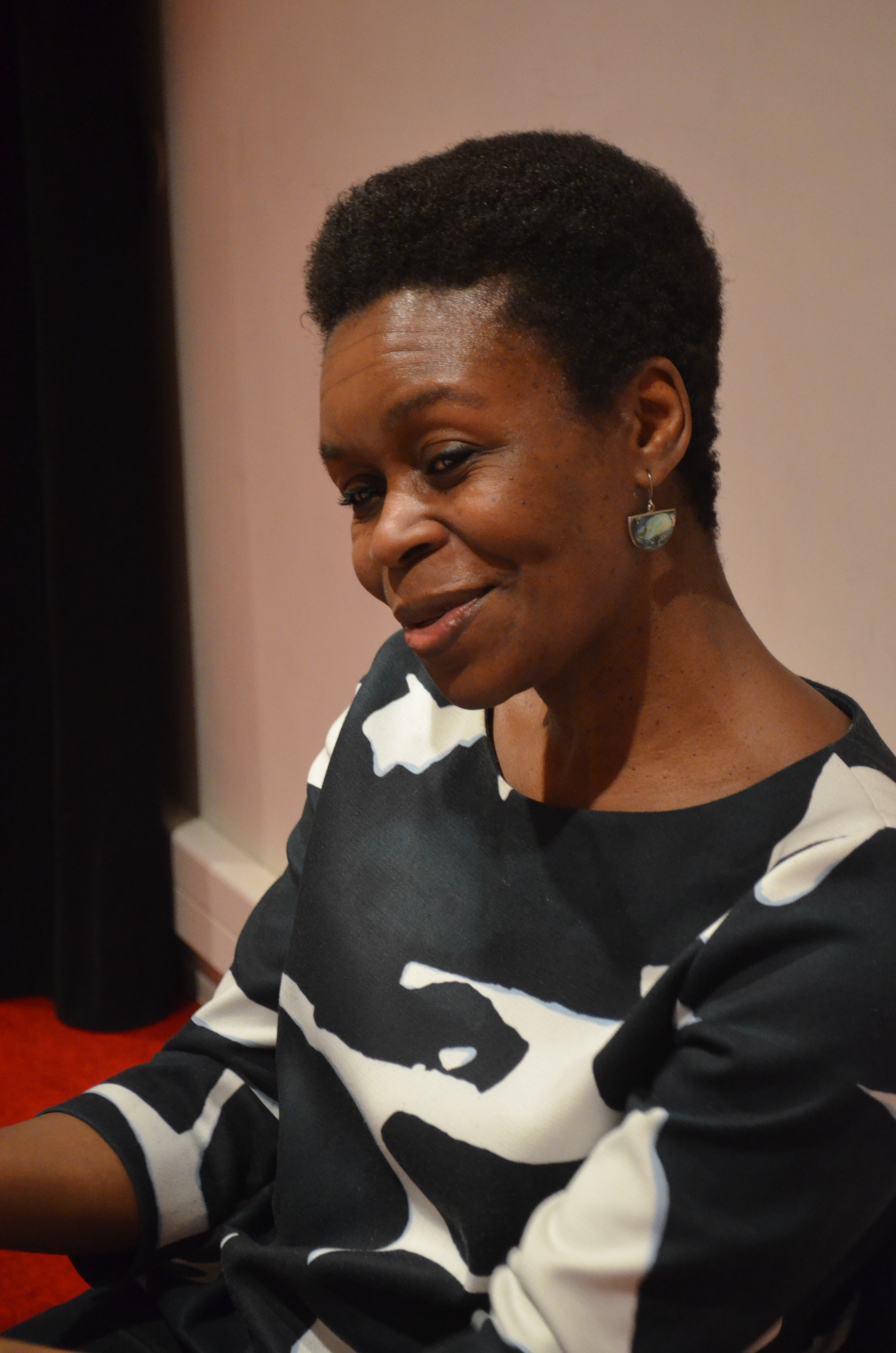
Kidi Bebey

Kidi Bebey is a French journalist and author.

Bebey was born in Paris, France. Her family was originally from Cameroon. Francis Bebey, her father, was a journalist, writer and musician. His work created a cultural environment for his children that encouraged them in writing and music. Two of her brothers became musicians.

Bebey studied literature at Lille University III and while there wrote a PhD thesis on "dance and literature in sahelian and bantou writers." She later received a master's degree in management at Paris Business School ESCP. In 1993, she became Editor-in-Chief of Planete Jeunes a Bayard Press magazine for young African-french readers. She was also the Editor-in-Chief Planet Enfants, a magazine dedicated to younger readers. From 2006 to 2009, she produced a daily program on Radio France International named "reines d'Afrique" (Africa's Queens).

In 2016, she wrote Mon royaume pour une guitare (transl. My Kingdom for a Guitar) which is a book mainly based on her parents' life and the musician's life of her father Francis Bebey.

== Books ==
- Pourquoi je ne suis pas sur la photo, Édicef, 1999
- Dans la cour des grands, Coédition CEDA Abidjan/Hurtubise HMH Canada, 1999 (rééd. Édicef Hachette International, 2011)
- Francis Bebey : l'homme orchestre (coord.), L'Harmattan, 2002
- Les Paris des Africains (dir. Kadiatou Konaré), Cauris Éditions, 2002 (contribution)
- Les ados, grands oubliés de l'édition africaine », in Takam Tikou, n^{o} 10, février 2003
- Ouste les loups, Bayard Press éditions, 2004
- C'est dur... Quand papa n'a plus de travail, Océan éditions/SCEREN/CRDP La Réunion, 2006
- Un bébé... Et moi, alors, Bayard Press Éditions, 2007
- Filles et garçons, tous différents, tous égaux, Belin International Éditions/RFI, 2008
- Modibo Keita, le premier président du Mali, Cauris Éditions,2010
- Kwame Nkrumah, Il rêvait d'unir les Africains, Cauris Éditions, 2010
- Les Saï-Saï et le bateau-fantôme, Édicef Hachette International, 2011
- Les Saï-Saï; Mystère à l'école de foot, Édicef Hachette International, 2011
- Les Saï-Saï et les voleurs de voix Édicef Hachette International, 2012
- Les Saï-Saï et le secret du marché, Édicef Hachette International, 2012
- Les Saï-Saï contre l'escroc du web, Édicef Hachette International, 2013
- Adaptation série télé : Chica vampiro: La grande fête des vampires, Paris: PKJ, Coll. Pocket Jeunesse, 2016, (ISBN 978-2-266-26870-7)
- Adaptation série télé: Chica vampiro : le pouvoir de Daisy, Paris: PKJ, Coll. Pocket Jeunesse, 2016. (ISBN 978-2-266-26868-4)
- Adaptation série télé: Chica vampiro: vampire malgré elle, Paris: PKJ, Coll. Pocket Jeunesse, 2016. (ISBN 978-2-266-26867-7)
- Adaptation série télé: Chica vampiro: Être ou ne pas être vampire, Paris: PKJ, Coll. Pocket Jeunesse, 2016. (ISBN 978-2-266-26869-1)
- Seuls 1 - La disparition- roman d'après l'univers de Fabien Velhmann et Bruno Gazzotti, Paris: PKJ, Coll. Pocket Jeunesse, 2017. (ISBN 978-2-266-27544-6)
- Seuls 2 - Le Maître des couteaux- roman d'après l'univers de Fabien Velhmann et Bruno Gazzotti, Paris: PKJ, Coll. Pocket Jeunesse, 2017. (ISBN 978-2-266-27723-5)
- Seuls 3 - Le clan du requin- roman d'après l'univers de Fabien Velhmann et Bruno Gazzotti, Paris: PKJ, Coll. Pocket Jeunesse, 2017. (ISBN 978-2-266-28168-3)
- Mon royaume pour une guitare, Michel Lafon, 2016, 319 p. (ISBN 978-2749927800),
- Enfin Chez Moi
