= Nkor =

Coordinates: 6.3966°N 10.5831°E

- Commune and town
- Interactive map of Nkor
- Country: Cameroon
- Time zone: UTC+1 (WAT)

Nkor is a town and commune in Cameroon.

== See also ==
- Communes of Cameroon
