= Veye Tatah =

Cameroonian computer scientist and journalist

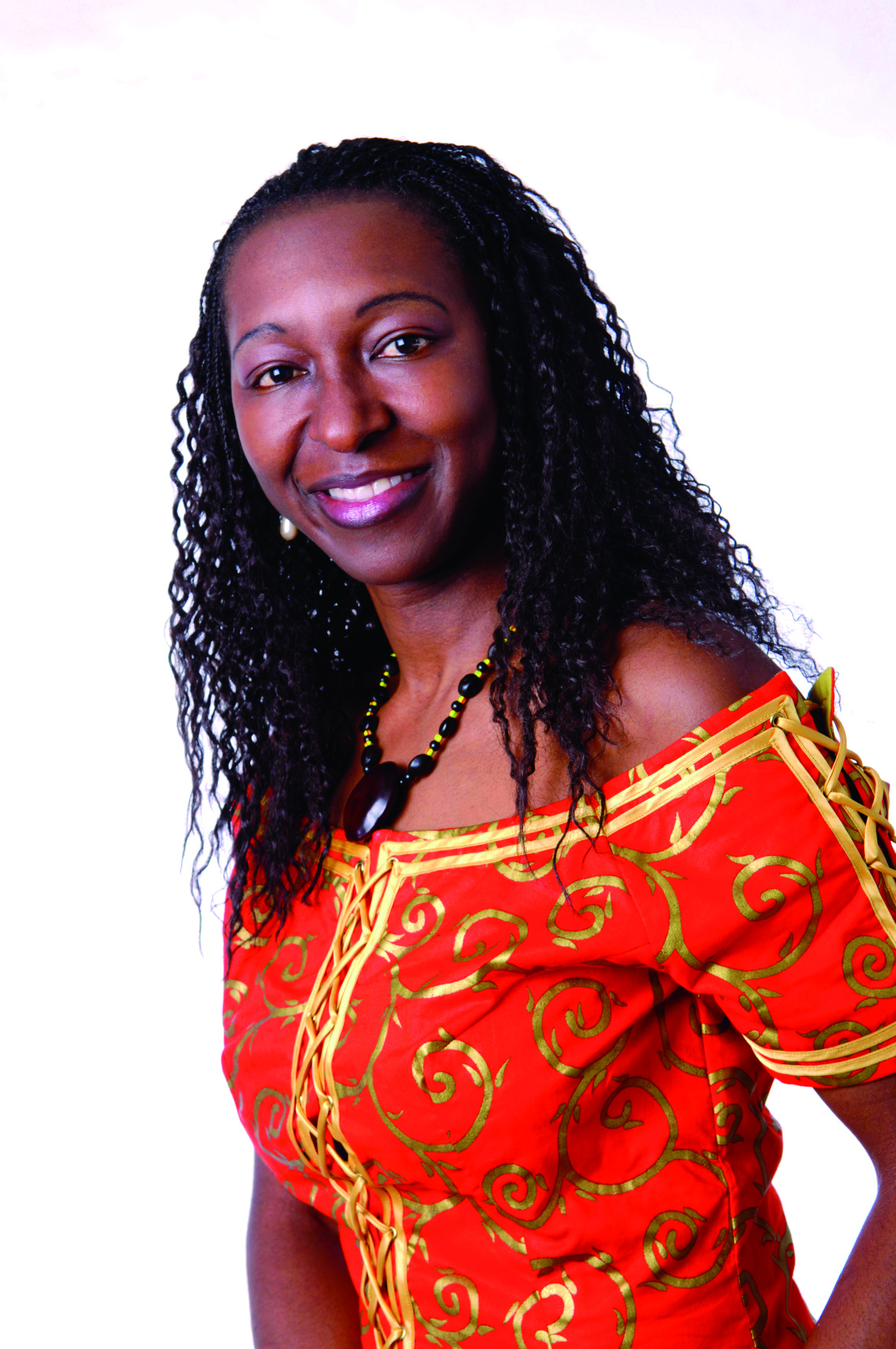
- Born: 1971 (age 54–55); Cameroon

Veye Wirngo Tatah (born c.1971) is a Cameroonian computer scientist and journalist who lives in Germany. She is an advocate for Africa who has received an Order of Merit from the German state.

== Life ==
Tatah was born in about 1971 and she arrived in Germany in 1991. She was born in Cameroon but became a German citizen in 2002. She worked for over six years as a computer science research assistant with the Technical University of Dortmund. She then became an IT consultant managing projects and particularly those concerned with inter-cultural communication. Tatah owns a catering company called Kilimanjaro Food.

Tatah has two children. She has also set a number of initiatives including the Learning and integration mobile app African-LIM, the "African Women's Network" and Africa Positive.

Tatah endeavours to increase international understanding. On 25 February 2010 Tatah received the Order of Merit of the Federal Republic of Germany for her special social engagement. She has been involved in the training of thirty journalists from Gambia at the Erich-Brost-Institut in 2019. The journalists were being offered the purpose of reporting on migration.
