= Jeanne-Louise Djanga =

Cameroonian writer

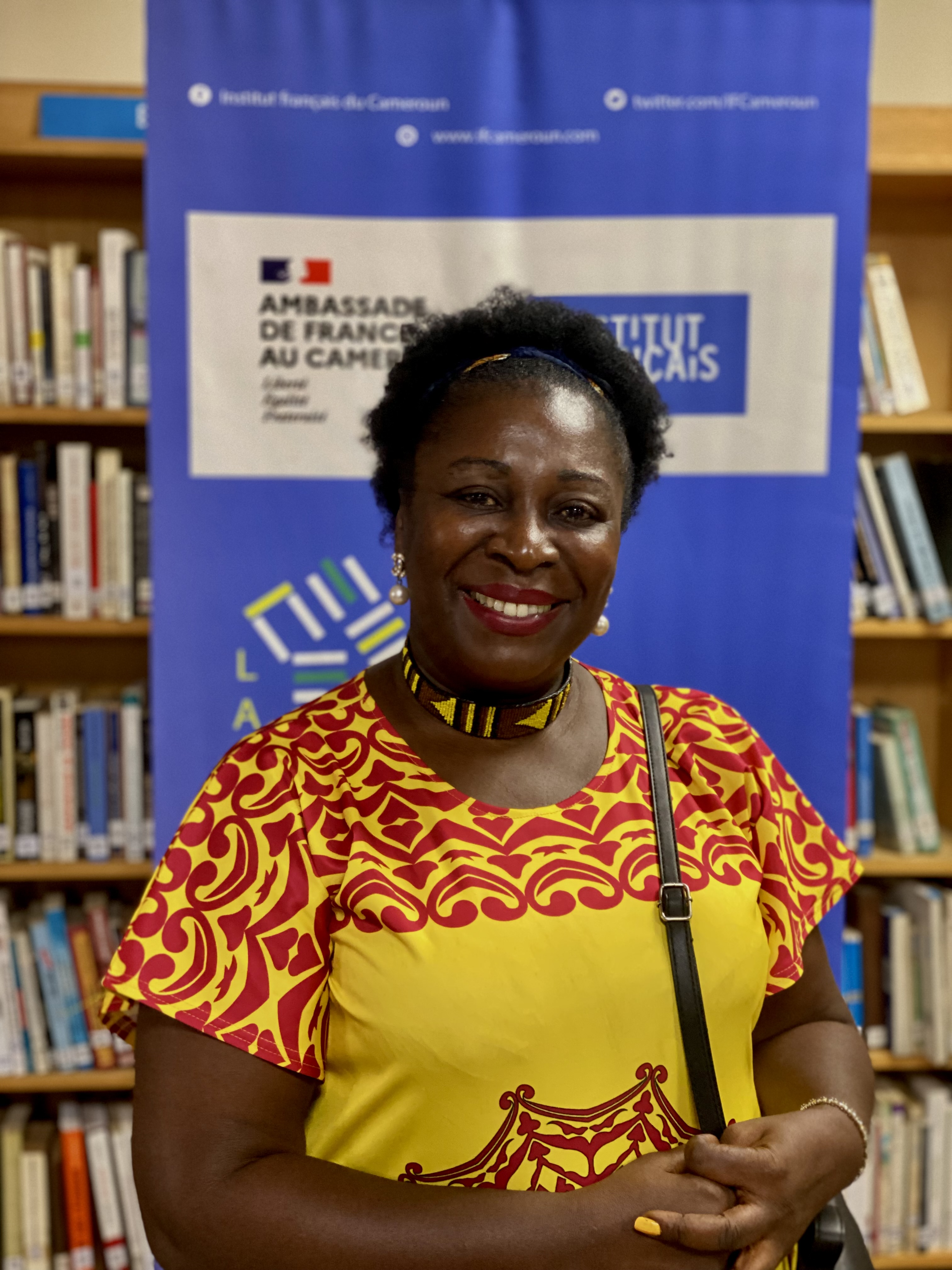
- Djanga in 2023
- Born: Yaoundé, Cameroon
- Occupations: Poet; novelist; choreographer
- Writing career
- Language: French
- Years active: 2007–present

Jeanne-Louise Djanga is a Cameroonian poet, novelist and choreographer.

== Life and career ==
Djanga was born in Yaoundé, Cameroon, and grew up in the small village of Bonékoulé Wouri Bossoua. She has said that her father (who worked as a school director then as a financier) encouraged her love of books and music. She was educated in Cameroon and France, and obtained her baccalauréat in mathematics and philosophy. She subsequently studied choreography at the Institut professionnel Méditerranée de danse de Montpellier.

Since 2007, Djanga has published several novels and a poetry collection, and has won prizes for her poetry. While based in France, she regularly returns to Cameroon, and says of her hometown: "It is a place conducive to the search for well-being. All the richness of this place inspires my writing."

In 2007, she founded Marché international africain (the African International Market), an annual conference in France celebrating the creative work of the African diaspora. The January 2024 edition of the conference was held over two days in Pantin, France.

== Selected works ==
- Au fil du Wouri (2007), poetry collection published by Editions de l'Harmattan
- Eclats de vers de voix de Rires (2009), poetic novel published by Dagan
- Le gâteau au foufou – ou les tribulations d'une afro-camer-ançaise (2011), novel published by Éditions l'Harmattan
- Fantasia Bienvenue à Paris, France, Europe (2015), novel published by Editions de l'Harmattan
- Rêver de vivre ... Le rêve qui nous manque (2017), published by Editions Menaibuc
- Le Cadenas, cahier d'un détour au pays natal (2022), novel published by AfricAvenir International
