= Jeanne Ngo Mai =

Cameroonian poet

Jeanne Ngo Mai (1933 – 2008) was a Cameroonian writer writing in French.

She was born in Poutchack near Ngambé and was educated in Sackbayeme, in Yaoundé and in Toulouse, France, where she received a degree in pharmacy. Ngo Mai returned to Cameroon in 1962, working as chief pharmacist in the hospital at Yaoundé. She opened her own pharmacy in 1963, operating it until 1993.

Many of her poems appeared in the publication Le Cameroun littéraire. In 1967, she published the collection of poems Poèmes sauvages et lamentations.
