= Patrice Kayo =

African scholar, poet, and author (born 1942)

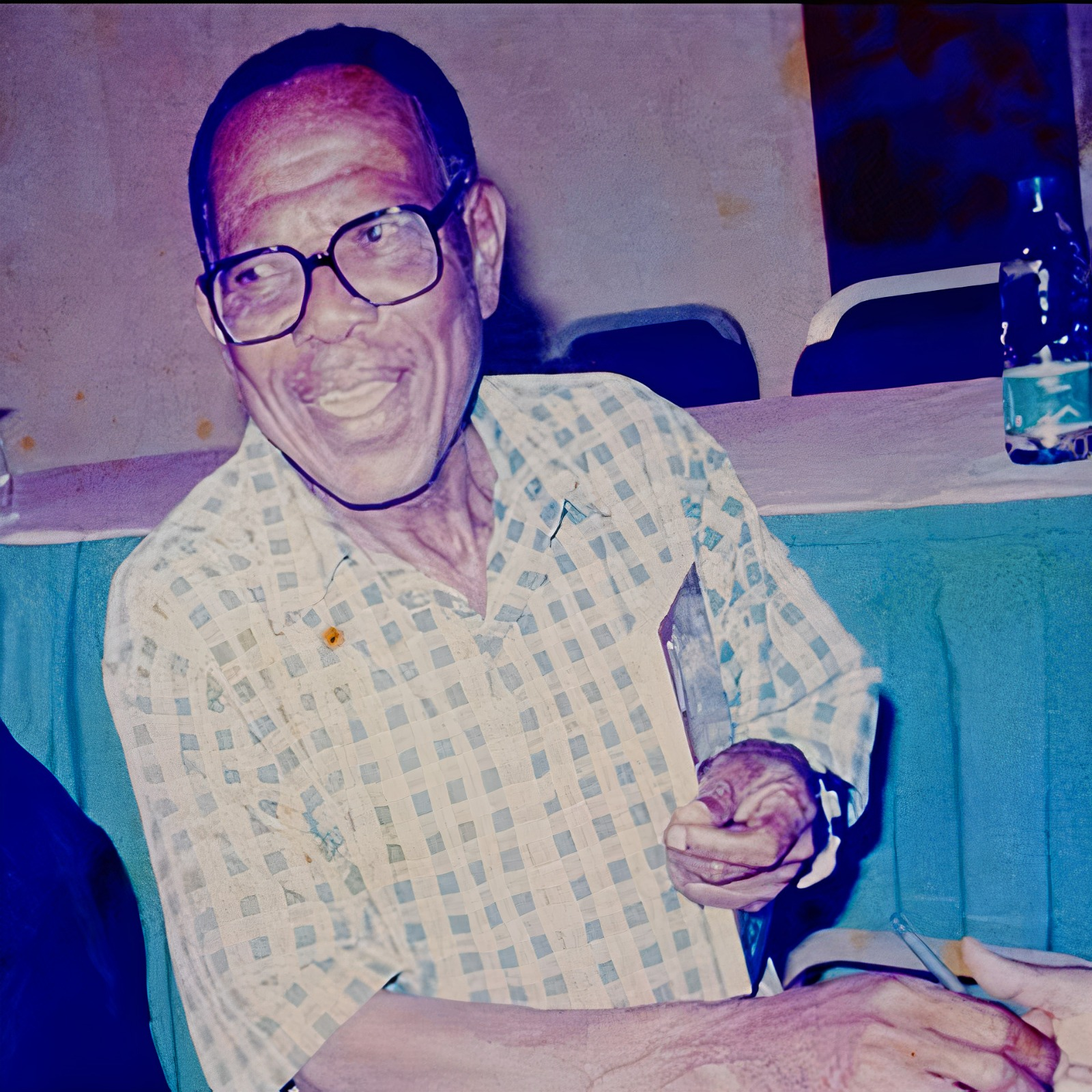
Patrice Kayo

Patrice Kayo is an African scholar, poet, and author born in 1942 in Bandjoun, West Province, Cameroon. He is also known for his radical opposition to Paul Biya's political regime, and his advocacy for freedom of speech and human rights.

He served as chairman of the National Association of Poets and Writers of Cameroon from 1969 to 1981, and was one of the founders of the International Federation of French-speaking Writers established in 1982 in Quebec, Canada.

Patrice Kayo was the president of the jury of the 2018 edition of the Grand Prix of Literary Associations.

Patrice Kayo holds a BA and Master of Arts in Education from the University of Yaounde, then a PhD from the University of Paris, Sorbonne, in France.

== Tribute ==
Patrice Kayo was awarded the Grand Prix des Mécènes of the GPLA 2015.

== Works ==
- Les fetes tragiques (Novel, Presses Universitaires d'Afrique, 2007)
- Tout le long des saisons (Novel, Editions CLE, 2001)
- Anthologie de la poesie camerounaise (Collection of Poetry, Presses Universitaires de Yaounde, 2000)
- Fables des Montagnes (Tales for children, Editions CLE, 1998) For ages 12 to 14.
- Chansons populaires bamileke (Imprimerie Saint Paul, 1996)
- En attendant l'Aurore (Collection of Poetry, CLE, 1988)
- Les sauterelles (Novel, Editions CLE, 1986)
- Dechirements (Silex, 1983)
- 'Fables et devinettes de mon enfance (Tales for children, Editions CLE, 1979)
