= Anne Mireille Nzouankeu =

Cameroonian journalist

- Occupation: Journalist
- Known for: Gay rights journalism
- Awards: Lorenzo Natali Media Prize, 2011

Anne Mireille Nzouankeu is a journalist living and working in Cameroon, located on the west coast of Africa.

== Career ==
Nzouankeu is a correspondent for the Cameroonian daily paper Le Jour, the British daily newspaper The Guardian, as well as the Dutch radio station Radio Netherlands Worldwide. She began her career contributing to online news distributors and she continues to write for various online journals.

One of her reports "Cameroun: la double vie des homosexuels" (Cameroon: the double life of homosexuals) described the dire consequences of her country's legal maneuvers to criminalize homosexual people and it ignited a significant debate and aroused hostile reactions. Applauding her courage for bringing attention to this taboo subject, the European Commission awarded Nzouankeu the Lorenzo Natali Media Prize in the Africa Division on December 8, 2011, in Brussels, Belgium. The prize was launched in 1992 to "recognize and celebrate excellence in reporting on sustainable development issues." She was one of 17 journalists from around the world to be honored with the prize for outstanding journalistic work on the topics of development, human rights and democracy.

== Personal life ==
Nzouankeu lives in Yaoundé, Cameroon's capital city.

== See also ==
- List of Cameroonians
