= François Sengat-Kuo =

Cameroonian politician, diplomat, and poet

François Sengat-Kuo (August 4, 1931 in Douala, Cameroon – September 1997) is a Cameroonian politician, diplomat and poet.

François Sengat-Kuo completed elementary education at the Ecole Principale D’Akwa (Douala). He attended secondary school at the Lycée Leclerc (Yaoundé) and the Lyc.ée Pierre d’Ailly (Compiegne - France). An eminence grise of the late Cameroon National Union (UNC), his political engagement can be felt in his poetry. A militant of the Association of Students of Black Africa in France (FEANF), his work is laced with observations of the political landscape of Cameroon at the time. Editor of the journal Presence Africaine, he published numerous articles under the pseudonym Nditsouna Francisco.
