= Paul Dakeyo =

French-Cameroonian writer

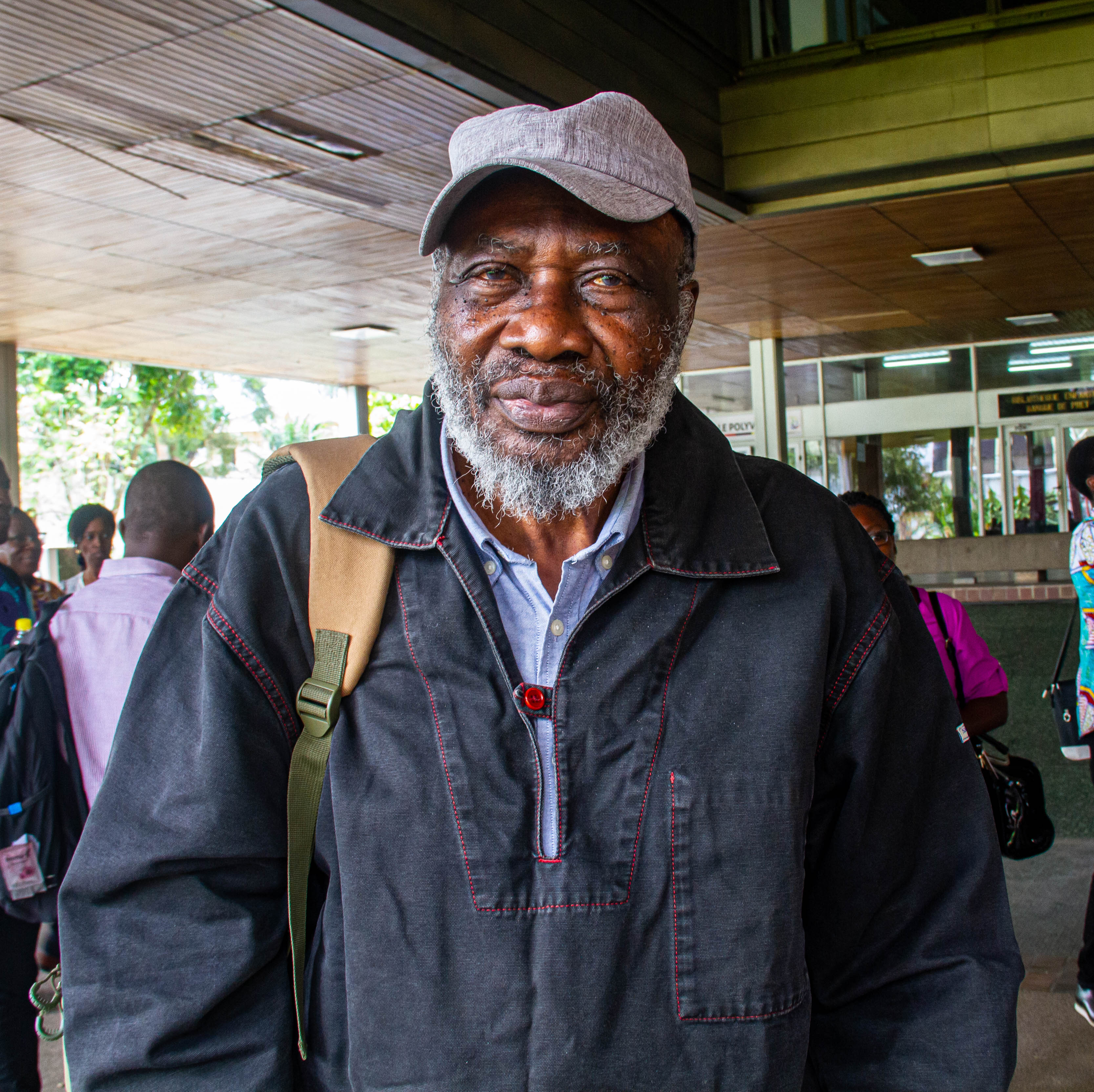
Image of Paul Dakeyo

Paul Dakeyo (born 1948) is a French-Cameroonian writer.

Dakeyo was born in Bafoussam, Cameroon. In 1969 he moved to Paris, where in 1980 he founded the publishing house Éditions Silex, later Nouvelles du Sud.

== Works ==
- Chant d'accusation, 1976
- La femme où j’ai mal, 1989
- Les ombres de la nuit, 1994
- Moroni, cet exil, 2002
