= Rose Epie Mbole =

Cameroonian television presenter and journalist

Rose Mbole Epie
- Born: Rose Mbole Epie; 15 October 1954 (age 71); Mbam-Song, North West Region, Cameroon
- Occupations: Journalist; television presenter
- Years active: 1978–2010s
- Employer: Cameroon Radio Television
- Known for: Hosting Tam-Tam Weekend and Tele Podium

Rose Mbole Epie (born 15 October 1954) is a Cameroonian journalist and television presenter known for her long career at the national broadcaster Cameroon Radio Television (CRTV). She became one of the most recognizable personalities of Cameroonian television through programs such as Tam-Tam Weekend, Tele Podium, and V comme Vedette.

She is widely regarded as one of the English-speaking journalists who contributed to the growth of CRTV programming during the late twentieth century.

In April 2025 she was inducted into the Cameroon Hall of Fame during the Cameroon International Film Festival (CAMIFF) held in Buea in recognition of her contributions to broadcasting.

== Early life and education ==
Rose Mbole Epie was born on 15 October 1954 in Mbam-Song in the North West Region of Cameroon. She is the third of eight children and was born a twin.

Her father, Martin Ekwoge Epie, served as one of the early Anglophone diplomats of Cameroon.

She received part of her secondary education abroad, studying in Sierra Leone, Liberia and Egypt before pursuing higher education in Canada.

== Career ==
=== Entry into broadcasting ===
Although she initially aspired to become a nurse, Epie entered journalism after being encouraged by acquaintances who admired her command of English.

In 1978 she passed the competitive recruitment examination to join Cameroon Radio, the predecessor of CRTV. She began her career in radio broadcasting presenting programmes such as Luncheon Date and Music of the World.

=== Television career ===
Epie later transitioned to television where she became one of CRTV’s prominent presenters.

In 1987 she began hosting the entertainment programme Tele Podium, which promoted Cameroonian music and performing arts.

She subsequently hosted several popular CRTV entertainment programmes including:

- Tam-Tam Weekend
- The Monday Show
- Tropicana
- V comme Vedette

Her charisma and distinctive English diction made her one of the most recognizable television personalities in Cameroon during the 1980s and 1990s.

== Later life ==
Following her retirement from CRTV, Epie has remained an influential figure in the history of Cameroonian broadcasting and frequently reflects on the early development of television journalism in the country.

== Recognition ==
In April 2025 she was inducted into the Cameroon Hall of Fame during the Cameroon International Film Festival (CAMIFF) in recognition of her contributions to television broadcasting in Cameroon.

== Selected chronology ==
- 1954-10-15 — Born in Mbam-Song, North West Region, Cameroon.
- 1978 — Joined Cameroon Radio Television after passing recruitment examinations.
- 1987 — Began hosting Tele Podium.
- 1980s–2000s — Hosted several CRTV entertainment programmes including Tam-Tam Weekend.
- 2025-04-30 — Inducted into the Cameroon Hall of Fame at CAMIFF.

== See also ==
- Media in Cameroon
- Cameroon Radio Television
