= Careen Pilo =

Cameroonian author and diplomat

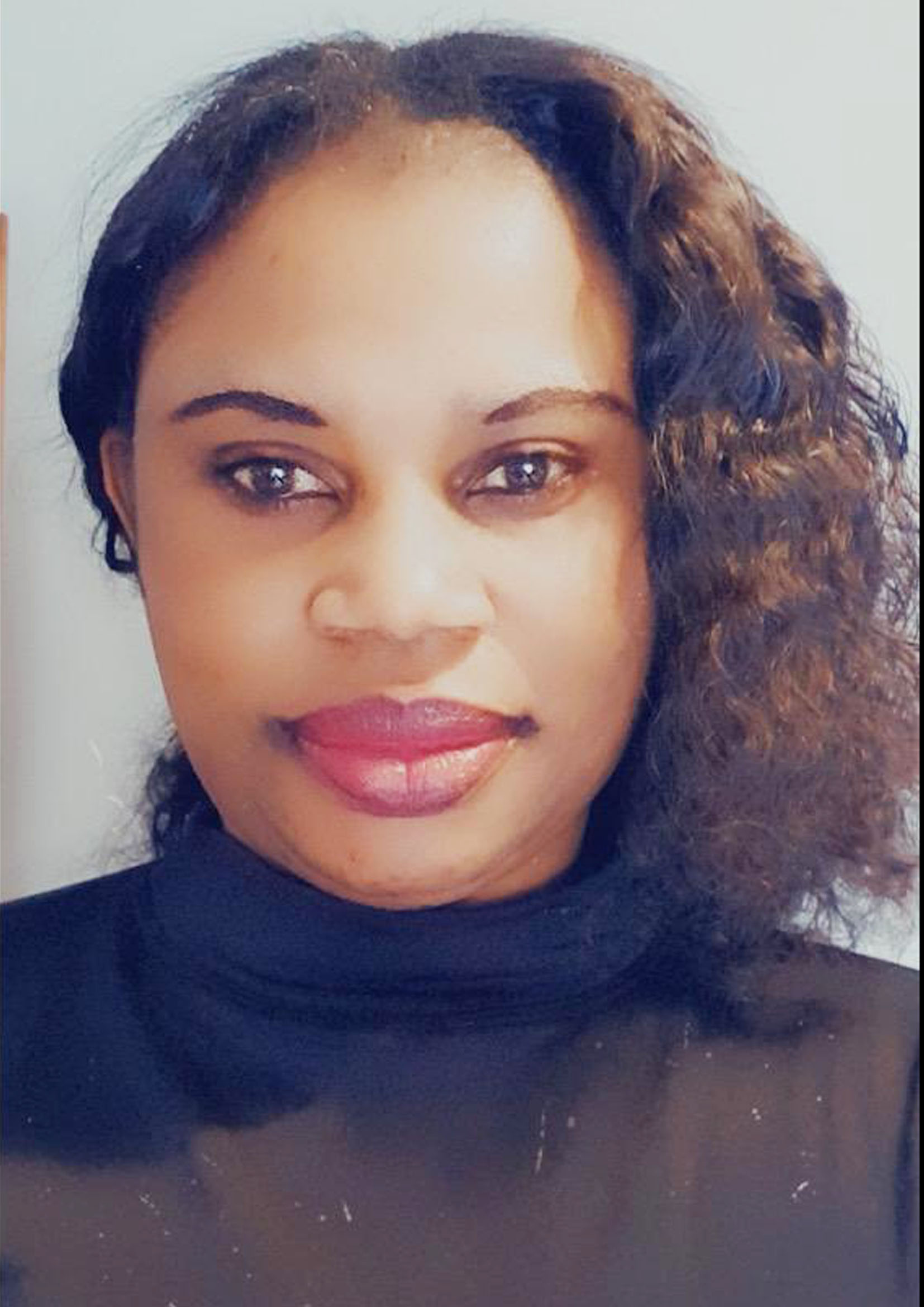
- Born: Careen Pilo Selangai; Cameroon
- Occupations: Author, writer, diplomat
- Employer(s): Government of Cameroon, Ministry of Foreign Affairs
- Known for: Romantic fiction writing

Careen Pilo Selangai who writes as Careen Pilo is an author, writer, and diplomat from Cameroon.

== Career ==
Pilo has written four romantic works of fiction, an academic paper on gender in sub-Saharan Africa, and a United Nation Development Programme report on Conflict Prevention and Peacebuilding in the Democratic Republic of the Congo.

Since 2017, Pilo has worked as the First Secretary at the Cameroonian embassy to Italy, in Rome.

== Selected publications ==
- Pilo, Careen, Les marées affriolantes de l’amour. 2019, L'Harmattan, ISBN 978-9-956-63747-8
- Pilo, Careen, Under the charm of a prostitute, 2009, L'Harmattan, ISBN 978-2-296-08630-2
- Pilo, Careen, Prévention Des Conflits et construction de la paix: le PNUD en RDC, 2018, UNDP, ISBN 978-613-1-59955-2
- Pilo, Careen, Les Vagues tumultueuses de l’amour, 2016, L'Harmattan, ISBN 978-2-343-06876-3
- Pilo, Careen, Quand l'espoir se réveille..., 2013, L'Harmattan, ISBN 978-2-336-00920-9
- Lee, Jin-rang; Hong, Sol; Selangai, Careen Pilo; Bonchi, Binangma; Ahoua, Magloire; and Diouf, Nathalie, Analysis of ODA Projects on Gender Equality in Sub-Saharan Africa: Using Moser's Gender Diagnostic Tool 국제지역연구 19.2 (2015) (in Korean)

== See also ==
- Foreign relations of Cameroon
