= Evelyne Mpoudi Ngolé =

Cameroonian novelist

- Born: 1953 (age 72–73); Yaounde
- Occupations: Author and educator

Evelyne Sono Epoh Mpoudi Ngolé, also Ngollé (born 1953), is a Cameroonian French-language author and educator. Her first novel, Sous la cendre le feu (Fire under the Ashes), was published in 1990.

== Biography ==
Mpoudi Ngolé was born in Yaoundé in 1953 where her father was a civil servant. After primary education in Nkongsamba, she attended the girls' lycée in Douala. She then studied literature at the universities of Yaoundé and Bordeaux, earning a doctorate. After various educational positions, in 1996 she was appointed headmistress (proviseur) of Yaoundé's Lycée d'Elig-Essono with over 3,000 pupils.

Her first novel, Sous la cendre le feu (1990), deals with the place of African women faced with the move from traditional life into the modern world. Interviewed by Elyze Razin, Ngolé explained that she had been inspired to write the novel while in Belgium where her husband, a military physician, had been posted for two years. She hoped the novel would reveal the problems facing African women who were often forced to do housework or work in the fields rather than completing their education or entering professional life like men.

In 1997, when her husband become involved in the national programme for fighting AIDS, she began to write a novel dealing with the problem but apparently it was never completed.

In 2009, she published her second novel, Petit Jo, enfant des rues. Although it deals with the problem of street children who are faced with society's indifference, it is a captivating story with a happy ending. From the time of its publication, the book was to be used as a reader in Malian schools.

== Selected works ==
- Sous la cendre le feu. L'Harmattan. 1990. ISBN 978-2-7384-0634-7.
- Petit Jo, enfant des rues. Hachette Livre international Edicef. 2009. ISBN 978-2-7531-0238-5.
