= Joyce Ashuntantang =

Cameroonian poet and creative writer

- Occupation: Writer

Joyce Ashuntantang is a Cameroonian poet and creative writer. She has contributed to nine international anthologies of poetry and currently a tenured Professor of English at the University of Hartford, West Hartford, Connecticut.

== Biography ==
Ashuntantang started writing publications when she was in secondary school. She received a B.A in English with a minor in Theater Arts from the University of Yaoundé, Cameroon with a Master's in Library and Information Science from the University of Aberystwyth, UK, a Masters in English from Hunter College, and a Ph.D. in English/African Literature from the Graduate Center of the City University of New York.

She has published more than four books of poetry and contributed to 13 volumes of international poetry anthologies as well as one short story anthology which include Landscaping Postcoloniality: The Dissemination of Cameroon Anglophone Literature (2009) and three poetry collections, Their Champagne Party will End: Poems in Honor of Bate Besong, co-edited (2008), A Basket of Flaming Ashes (2010) and Beautiful Fire (2018). Her poems have been translated into Spanish, Greek, Hebrew, Turkish, Bangla, Arabic and Romanian.

== Awards ==
Her Awards include Spirit of Detroit Award for Leadership (1987), Ministry of Culture, Cameroon, Award for Outstanding Performance in Theater (1989, 1994), Belle K. Ribicoff Prize for Excellence in Teaching and Scholarship (2012), Kathrak-Bangladesh Literary Award, and the African Literature Association (ALA) Book of the Year Award - Creative Writing 2020 for her poetry collection Beautiful Fire (2018).
