= Charisma University =

University in the Turks and Caicos Islands

Coordinates: 21°47′38″N 72°10′35″W

- Type: Private, non-profit
- Established: 2011
- President: Dr. William Martin Sloane
- Faculty: 100
- Administrative staff: 50
- Undergraduates: Over 8,000
- Postgraduates: Over 2,000
- Location: (United Kingdom) Providenciales, Turks and Caicos Islands, British Overseas Territories, (United States) Billings, Montana, USA
- Colours: Blue and gold
- Website: https://charisma.edu.eu/

Charisma University (CU) is an academic institution established in 2011 and located in the Turks and Caicos Islands (TCI), British Overseas Territories of the United Kingdom. It is a non-profit institution recognized by the Turks and Caicos Islands Ministry of Education, Labour, Employment and Customer Service to offer accredited undergraduate, graduate, post-graduate degree programs and certificate programs in various disciplines taught by over 100 faculty members. Charisma University was approved the award of post-secondary degrees by educational institutions in the State of Montana in 2023, and the university established a branch in Montana to offer US degrees.

The university specializes in providing for adult learners and online learning.

The Center for Advanced Research and Innovation (CARI) was established as an independent organization under the auspices of Charisma University. The Center provides facilities for higher research in various areas of Humanities, Social Science and Technology disciplines. CARI is also aimed at establishing and promoting exchange programs with academic, research, training institutes and think tank organizations at home and abroad.

Charisma University is an institutional member of the American Council on Education (ACE). ACE is a member of the International Association of Universities (IAU).

Charisma University is a member of the Council for Higher Education Accreditation International Quality Group (CIQG). The CHEA International Quality Group (CIQG) advances the understanding of international quality assurance and promotes high-quality higher education through international accreditation bodies worldwide.

== Accreditation ==
Charisma University is recognized by the Turks and Caicos Islands Ministry of Education, Labour, Employment and Customer Service as a degree-granting institution for associate degree, Bachelor's degree, Master's degree, and the Doctorate along with Certificate programs. Ministry of Education, Labour, Employment and Customer Service is recognized by the Council for Higher Education Accreditation (CHEA).

Charisma University is accredited by the Accreditation Council for Business Schools and Programs (ACBSP). ACBSP accredits business, accounting, and business-related programs at the associate, baccalaureate, master, and doctorate degree levels worldwide. ACBSP is recognized by the Council for Higher Education Accreditation (CHEA).

Charisma University is a member of the Transnational Association of Christian Colleges and Schools (TRACS) having been awarded Accredited Status as a Category IV institution by the TRACS Accreditation Commission on October 22, 2024. This status is effective as of July 1, 2024, and is good through June 30, 2029. TRACS's accreditation is recognized by both the U.S. Department of Education and CHEA.

Charisma University is also institutionally accredited by the Accreditation, Certification, and Quality Assurance Institute (ACQUIN).

Charisma University is listed on the European Quality Assurance Register for Higher Education (EQAR). The European Quality Assurance Register for Higher Education (EQAR) is the European Association for Quality Assurance in Higher Education's (ENQA) and the European Higher Education Area's (EHEA) official register of QAAs, listing those that substantially comply with the ESG.

Charisma University is listed in the collaborative International Association of Universities (IAU) and United Nations Educational, Scientific and Cultural Organization (UNESCO).

Charisma University's Cross-Border Accreditation

Charisma University is considered a case study in cross-border accreditation, a model recognized by international higher education organizations.

According to the MACCA Manual – Mercosur Accreditation Agency, “cross-border accreditation plays a significant role in higher education.” UNESCO and the OECD define cross-border education as that in which “the teacher, student, program, institution/provider, or course materials cross national borders.”

This model confirms the already established practice in international higher education: accreditation agencies, whether institutional or programmatic, do not limit their activities to their national territory and can evaluate and accredit universities in different countries.

== Schools, faculties and institutes ==
The university currently offers over forty-degree programs and three graduate certificates in its six schools:

- School of Business
- School of Education
- School of Law
- School of Philosophy and Religion
- School of Psychology and Behavioral Science
- School of Health Sciences

== University rankings ==
The Knowledge Review Magazine selected Charisma University as one of the 10 Best Universities of Caribbean Islands in 2019.

Charisma University is listed and ranked 801+ in the Impact Rankings: Quality education 2021 in the Times Higher Education World University Rankings.

== See also ==
- List of universities in the United Kingdom
- List of colleges and universities in Montana
