= Delphine Zanga Tsogo =

Cameroonian writer, feminist, and politician (1935–2020)

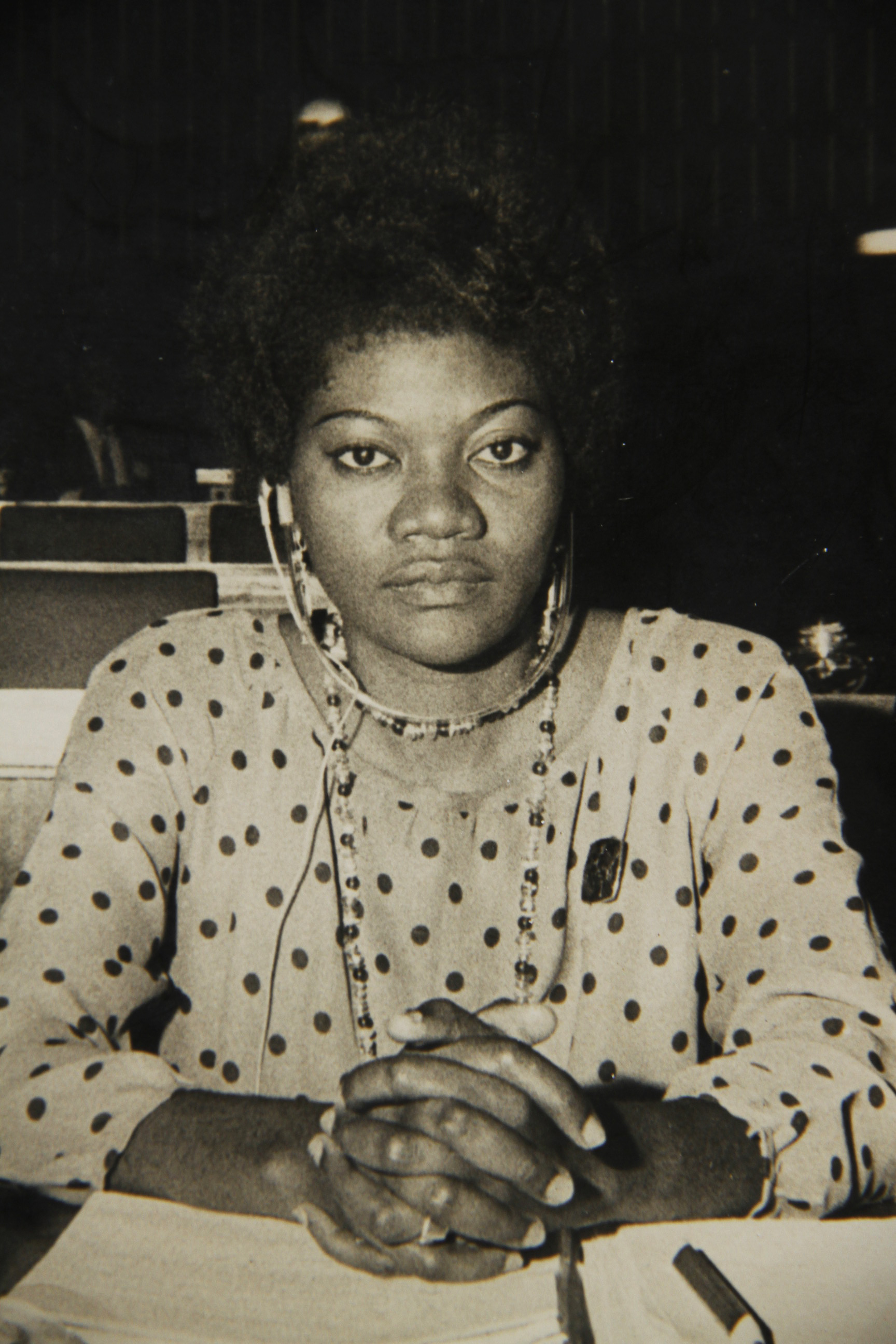
- Delphine Zanga Tsogo
- Born: December 21, 1935; Lomié, British Cameroon
- Died: July 16, 2020 (aged 84)

National Assembly Member
- In office 1965–1972
- President: Ahmadou Ahidjo

Delphine Zanga Tsogo (December 21, 1935 – July 16, 2020) was a Cameroonian writer, feminist and politician. She served in the country's National Assembly from 1965 to 1972. Her married surname was Tsanga.

== Biography ==
She was born in Lomié and was educated at Douala, going on to study nursing in Toulouse, France. She returned to Cameroon in 1960, working as a nurse in various hospitals. In 1964, she was elected national president of the Council of Cameroonian Women. From 1970 to 1975, she served as Vice Minister for Health and Public Welfare. From 1975 to 1984, she was Minister for Social Affairs for Cameroon.

She served as president of the administrative council for the United Nations International Research and Training Institute for the Advancement of Women, as well as president of the Comité Régional Africain de Coordination pour l’Intégration des Femmes au Développement. and vice-president of the International Council of Women. She was named to the French National Order of Merit.

In 1983, she wrote her first novel Vies de Femmes (Women's Lives). This was followed by L'Oiseau en cage (The Caged Bird) the following year. Through her writing, she combined storytelling with feminist advocacy, amplifying the voices of women in Cameroon and across Africa. Her dual legacy as both a politician and a writer reflects her commitment to advancing women’s rights and social development. She died on 16 July 2020 in Yaoundé at the age of 84. Her death marked the end of a remarkable career, but her contributions to politics, literature, and feminism continue to inspire generations of Cameroonian women. She is remembered as a trailblazer who opened doors for women in leadership and used her pen to challenge societal norms.
