= Bole Butake =

Cameroonian playwright and professor (1947–2016)

Bole Botake
- Born: 28 July 1947; Nkor
- Died: 1 October 2016; Yaoundé
- Occupation: Playwright

Bole Botake (1947–2016) was an anglophone Cameroonian playwright, poet, and critic known for using theatre for political intervention and education.

== Early life and education ==
Bole Butake was born in 1947 in Nkor, Noni subdivision in the North West region of Cameroon. He pursued his education at Sacred Heart College Mankon and the renowned Cameroon College of Arts Science and Technology, Bambili. He later joined the University of Yaoundé, where he earned a BA in Modern English Letters(1972), a Maîtrise(1973) and a Master's degree in English Literature from the University of Leeds, England(1974). He then completed a PhD at Yaoundé u der the faculty of Social Science in 1983. He taught at the University of Yaoundé until 2012 when he retired after attaining position of full professor of Performing Arts and African Literature

== Career ==
=== Dramatist and director ===
Butake established an international reputation as a dramatist with plays like Lake God, And Palm Wine Will Flow, The Survivors, Dance of the Vampires and The Rape of Michelle, all of which have political underpinnings. He was one of a generation of Anglophone authors who were deeply engaged in the politics of their time, and became a household name in Cameroon in the 1980s and 1990s. A number of scholars have analysed his work, often focusing on their political critique and direct engagement with oppression, democracy and human rights and the role of the nation.

Butake was political in staging the plays of other authors as well. In 1991 he directed Bate Besong's play Beasts of No Nation, leading to the playwright being arrested for subversion. He also conducted workshops across Cameroon, teaching rural communities how to use theatre for social change.

=== Academic ===
Bole Butake was a professor of Performing Arts and African literature at the University of Yaoundé, where he taught for over 40 years before retiring in 2012.

== Works ==
- 1984: The Rape of Michelle, Yaounde, CEPER (published and performed)
- 1986: Lake God, Yaounde, BET & Co (Pub) Ltd. (published and performed).
- 1989: The Survivors, Yaounde, Editions SOPECAM (performed and published).
- 1990: And Palm-wine Will Flow, Yaounde, Editions SOPECAM (performed and published)
- 1993: Shoes and Four Men in Arms translated into German as VIER MANN IN UNIFORM UND EIN BERG SCHUHE and broadcast on Westdeutscher Rundfunk Köln. Toured Germany with The Flame Players in June 1996 (four performances).
- 1993: (with Gilbert Doho) Zintgraff and the Battle of Mankon, a semi-historical play (performed).
- 1995: Dance of the Vampires (performed; published in 1999).
- 1999: Lake God and other plays. Yaounde, Editions CLE
- 2003: Zintgraff and the Battle of Manko. Bamenda, Patron Publishing House.
- 2005: Family Saga. Yaounde, Editions CLE.
- 2005: Betrothal Without Libation. Yaounde, Editions CLE.
- 2010: Cameroon Anthology of Poetry. Yaounde, Africana
- 2004: Cinema and Social discourse in Cameroon.
