= Sankie Maimo =

- Born: 1930 (age 95–96)
- Citizenship: Cameroon
- Occupations: Journalist, writer

Sankie Maimo (1930 – 4 September 2013) was a writer from British Southern Cameroons. Maimo moved to Ibadan, Nigeria, where he worked as a school teacher. He stayed in Nigeria from 1949 to 1962, where he founded the journal Cameroon Voice in 1955. This was followed by a play called I Am Vindicated in 1930, and a children's book called Adventuring with Jaja in 1972. He later produced his second play Sov-Mbang the Soothsayer in 1968, which was the only English book published by C.L.E. His works advocated the adoption of European values as a means to bring Africa into the wider world.

== Tribute ==
- Sankie Maimo was awarded the Grand prix de la mémoire of the GPLA 2014.

== Bibliography ==
- I Am Vindicated. Ibadan: Ibadan University Press, 1959 (Kraus reprint 1970).
- Sov-Mbang the Soothsayer. Yaounde: Editions Cle, 1968.
- Twilight Echoes. Yaounde: Cowrie Publications, 1979.
- The Mask. Yaounde: Cowrie Publications, 1980.
- Succession in Sarkov. Yaounde: SOPECAM, 1986.
- Sasse Symphony. Limbe: Nooremac Press, 1989.
- Retributive Justice or “La Shivaa.” Kumbo: Maimo, 1999.

== Notes ==
5. https://anglocamlit.blogspot.com/2007/11/profile-sankie-maimo.html?m=1
