= Werewere Liking =

Camerounian writer, playwright & performer (born 1950)

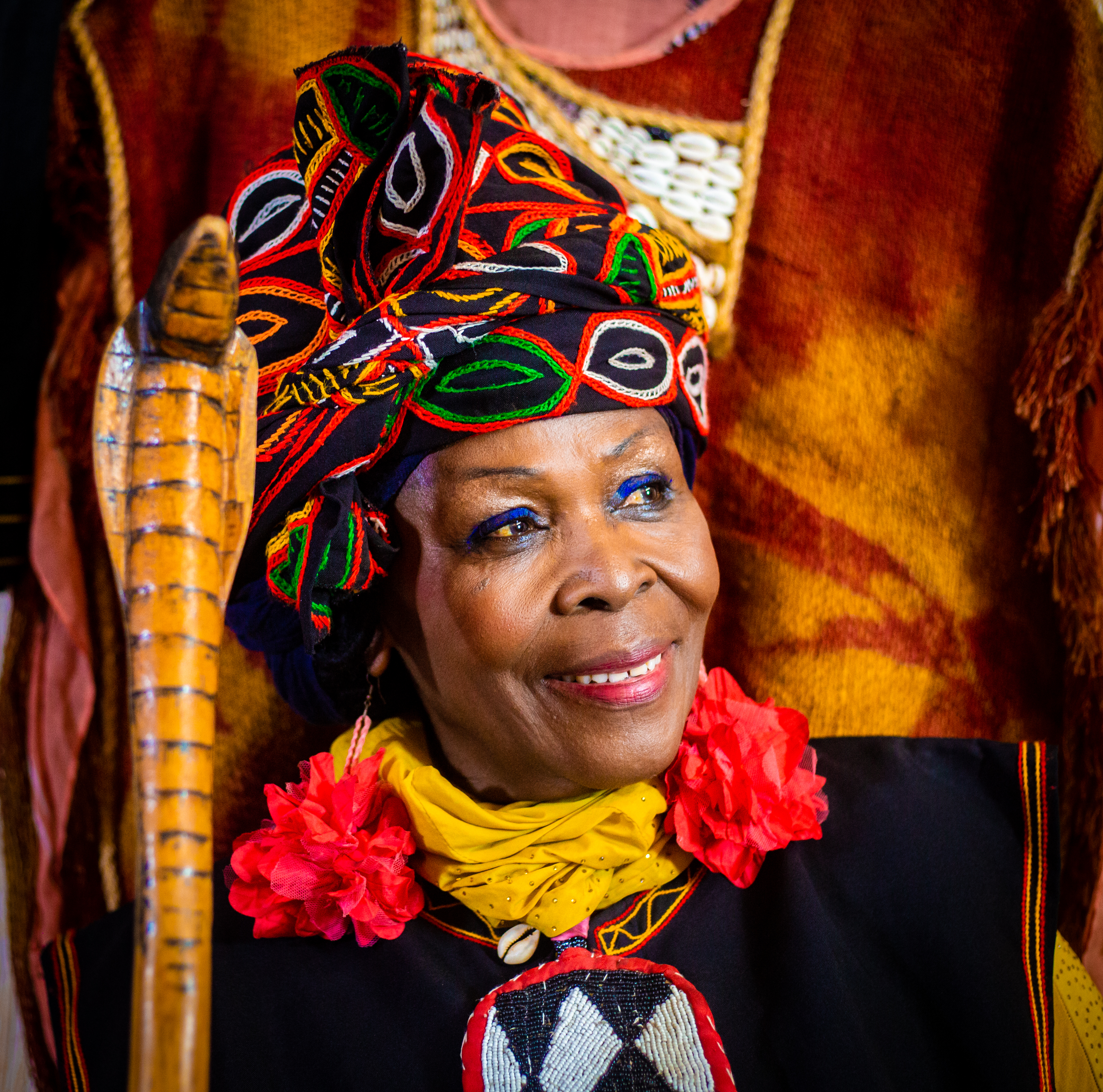
- Born: 1950 (age 75–76)
- Occupations: stage performer, writer
- Awards: Prince Claus Award in 2000

Werewere Liking (born 1950, in Cameroon) is a writer, playwright and performer based in Abidjan, Côte d'Ivoire. She established the Ki-Yi Mbock theatre troupe in 1980 and founded the Ki-Yi village in 1985 for the artistic education of young people.

Her novel Elle sera de jaspe et de corail is a song-novel recounted by an astute misovire (literally 'man-hater' from misos Gr. "hate" and vir Lat. "man") in writing a journal on nine themes as a dialectic between two men wherein the author of the journal imagines a new race of people uninhibited by the historical baggage of patriarchy and colonialism. She is the author of the African feminist theory "misovirism."

She received a Prince Claus Award in 2000 for her contributions to culture and society, and the Noma Award in 2005 for her book La mémoire amputée.

== Writing ==
Her books and plays include:

- La mémoire amputée, Nouvelles Editions Ivoiriennes (2004), ISBN 2-84487-236-0
- Elle sera de jaspe et de corail, Editions L'Harmattan (1983), ISBN 2-85802-329-8 - trans. Marjolijn De Jager, It shall be of jasper and coral; and, Love-across-a-hundred-lives (two novels), University Press of Virginia (2000), ISBN 0-8139-1942-8
- La puissance de Um (1979) and Une nouvelle terre (1980) - trans. Jeanne Dingome, African Ritual Theatre: The Power of Um and a New Earth, International Scholars Pubs. (1997), ISBN 1-57309-066-2
