= Guillaume Oyônô Mbia =

Cameroonian writer (1939–2021)

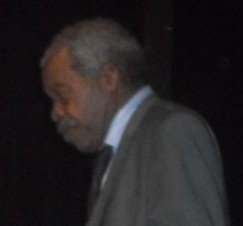
- Born: 2 March 1939; Zoétélé, French Cameroon
- Died: 10 April 2021 (aged 82); Yaoundé, Cameroon
- Occupation: Writer

Guillaume Oyônô Mbia (2 March 1939 – 10 April 2021) was a Cameroonian writer. An Anglicist, he also taught at the University of Yaoundé.

== Biography ==
Mbia was born in 1939 in Zoétélé in Cameroon's South Region. He finished secondary school in 1961 and began studying English in the United Kingdom, where he earned a bachelor's degree in 1969. Upon his return to Cameroon, he became an assistant in English department of the Faculty of Letters and Human Sciences of the University of Yaoundé. He then worked for the Ministry of Information and Culture from 1972 to 1975. In addition to his teaching activities, he was a playwright and a storyteller.

Guillaume Oyônô Mbia died in Yaoundé on 10 April 2021 at the age of 82.

== Prizes ==
- Prix du concours théâtral africain (1967)
- Prix du concours théâtral interafricain (1969)
- Prix El Hadji Ahmadou Ahidjo (1970)
- Grand Prix of Literary Associations (2013, 2014)
