= Francis Bebey =

Cameroonian musician and writer (1929–2001)

- Born: 15 July 1929; Douala, French Cameroun
- Died: 28 May 2001 (aged 71) Paris, France
- Genres: Makossa, classical guitar, jazz, pop, electronic
- Occupations: Artist, musician, poet, writer, radio broadcaster
- Instruments: Guitar, sanza, flute, percussion
- Years active: 1969–2000

Francis Bebey (French: [bəbɛ], 15 July 1929 in Douala, Cameroon – 28 May 2001 in Paris, France) was a Cameroonian musicologist, writer, composer, and broadcaster.

== Early life ==
Francis Bebey was born in Douala, Cameroon, on 15 July 1929. Bebey attended college in Douala, where he studied mathematics, before studying broadcasting at the University of Paris. He moved to the United States and continued to study broadcasting at New York University. In 1957, Bebey moved to Ghana at the invitation of Kwame Nkrumah, and took a job as a broadcaster.

== Music career ==
In the early 1960s, Bebey moved to France and started work in the arts, establishing himself as a musician, sculptor, and writer. He was also the first African musician to use electric keyboards and programmable drum machines which he set alongside traditional African instruments. His most popular novel was Agatha Moudio's Son. While working at UNESCO from 1961 to 1974, he was able to become the head of the music department in Paris. This job allowed him to research and document traditional African music.

Bebey released his first album in 1969 and would go on to release over 20 albums on Ozileka, between 1975 and 1997. His music was primarily guitar-based, but he integrated traditional African instruments and synthesizers as well. His style merged Cameroonian makossa with classical guitar, jazz, pop, and electronics, and was considered by critics to be groundbreaking, "intellectual, humorous, and profoundly sensual". He sang in Duala, English, and French.

Bebey helped launch the career of Manu Dibango. He also had a major role in popularizing the ndehu, a one-note bamboo flute created by the Central African pygmies. Bebey conducted field research among pygmy tribes, focusing especially on their musical traditions.

== Literary career ==
Bebey wrote novels, poetry, plays, tales, short stories, and nonfiction works. He began his literary career as a journalist in the 1950s and at one time worked as a journalist in Ghana and other African countries for the French radio network, Société de radiodiffusion de la France d'outre-mer (SORAFOM).

Bebey wrote poetry, including "Black Tears" (1963), a poem dedicated to the March on Washington for Jobs and Freedom. His first novel, Le Fils d'Agatha Moudio (Agatha Moudio's Son), was published in 1967 and awarded the Grand prix littéraire d'Afrique noire in 1968; it remains his best-known work. His novel, L'Enfant pluie (The Child of Rain), published in 1994, was awarded the Prize Saint Exupéry.

In addition to exploring childhood and adult experiences in his works, Bebey also wrote tales drawn from the African oral tradition.

== Death and legacy ==
Bebey died of a heart attack in Paris on 28 May 2001. He was survived by his children Patrick, Toups, and Kidi, as well as his wife.

John Williams' piece "Hello Francis" is written as a tribute to Bebey: "The piece is based on the Makossa, a popular dance rhythm from Cameroon often used by Francis, and includes a quote from his piece The Magic Box and a hidden bit of J.S. Bach."

Arcade Fire's song, "Everything Now," features a flute part from "The Coffee Cola Song" by Francis Bebey. The flute part was played by Patrick Bebey, Francis Bebey's son.

== Awards ==
Francis Bebey was awarded the Grand Prix de la Mémoire of the GPLA 2013 for his literary legacy. The Grand Prix de la Mémoire is an award dedicated to major writers of contemporary Cameroonian literature who have died. He was also awarded the Grand Prix Litteraire De L'Afrique Noire in 1968 for his first novel Le Fils d'Agatha Moudio (Agatha Moudio's Son). The Grand Prix Litteraire De L'Afrique Noire is a literary prize for Black Africa. Additionally, Bebey's novel L'Enfant pluie (Rain Child) won the Prix Saint Exupéry award in 1994.

== Discography ==
=== Albums ===
- Concert Pour Un Vieux Masque, LP, Philips, 1968
- Savannah Georgia, LP, Fiesta Records, 1975
- Guitare D'Une Autre Rime, LP, Ozileka, 1975
- La Condition Masculine, LP, Ozileka, 1976
- Fleur Tropicale, LP, Ozileka, 1976
- Je Vous Aime Zaime Zaime, LP, Ozileka, 1977
- Ballades Africaines, LP, Ozileka, 1978
- Priere Aux Masques. LP, Ozileka, 1979
- Un Petit Ivoirien, LP, Ozileka, 1979
- Afrikanischer Frühling, LP, Marifon, 1980
- Haïti - Guitar Music Trio, LP, Ozileka, 1981
- Bia So Nika, LP, Ozileka, 1981
- Africa Sanza, Ozileka, 1982
- New Track, Ozileka, 1982
- Pygmy Love Song, LP, Editions Makossa, 1982
- Super Bebey - Vingt Plages Ensoleillées, 2xLP, Ozileka, 1983
- Sanza Nocturne, Ozileka, 1984
- Akwaaba: Music For Sanza, Original Music, 1984
- Le Solo De Bruxelles, LP, Ozileka, 1985
- Heavy Ghetto, Anti Apartheid Makossa, LP, Ozileka, 1985
- Si Les Gaulois Avaient Su!, LP, Blue Silver, 1986
- Baobab, LP, Volume, 1988
- African Woman, LP, Volume, 1988
- World Music Guitar, CD, Ozileka, 1992
- Sourire De Lune, CD, Ozileka, 1996

=== Compilations ===
- Rire Africain, Ozileka, 1981
- Nadolo / With Love - Francis Bebey Works: 1963–1994, CD, Original Music, 1995
- African Electronic Music 1975–1982, LP/CD, Born Bad Records, 2011
- Psychedelic Sanza 1982–1984, LP/CD, Born Bad Records, 2014
- La Condition Masculine, CD, Sonodisc

== Bibliography ==
=== Works by Bebey ===
- La Radiodiffusion en Afrique noire, 1963 (English translation: Broadcasting in Black Africa)
- Le Fils d'Agatha Moudio, 1967 (English translation: Agatha Moudio's Son)
- Embarras & Cie: nouvelles et poèmes, 1968
- Trois petits cireurs, 1972 (English translation: Three Little Shoeshine Boys)
- La Poupée Ashanti, 1973 (English translation: The Ashanti Doll)
- Le Roi Albert d'Effidi, 1976 (English translation: King Albert)
- Musique de l'Afrique, 1969 (English translation: African Music: A People's Art)
- Le Ministre et le griot, 1992 (English translation: The Minister and the Griot)
- L'Enfant pluie, 1994 (English translation: Rain Child)

== See also ==
- Grand Prix of Literary Associations
- Grands prix des associations littéraires
