= Bate Besong =

Cameroonian playwright, poet and critic

Bate Besong Jacob
- Born: May 8, 1954; Calabar
- Died: March 8, 2007 (aged 52)
- Occupations: Writer, Poet and Teacher
- Writing career
- Genres: Poetry, Drama
- Literary movement: Postcolonialism, Postmodernism
- Website: batebesong.com

Bate Besong (1954–2007) was a Cameroonian playwright, poet and critic.

== Life and career ==
After obtaining his GCE A Level at St. Bedes Secondary School in Kom, Besong was admitted to the University of Calabar where he published his maiden collection of poems titled Polyphemous Detainee and Other Skulls in 1980 before he graduated. While at the university, Bate Besong and Ba'bila Mutia founded Oracle, a journal of poetry edited by students. Realising that his emerging reputation as a budding writer was giving him recognision as a Nigerian and compromising his Cameroonian identity, Besong returned to Cameroon after completing his MA. He was a lecturer at the University of Buea, where he taught from 1999 right up to his death in 2007.

In 1992, shortly after his play Beasts of No Nation was staged, Besong was kidnapped and tortured by state security agents who took him to an unknown location from where he was later released when news of his kidnapping became public. In 1992 he won the Association of Nigerian Authors' Prize for Requiem for the Last Kaiser. Besong later obtained a PhD in Literary Studies from Calabar (Nigeria).

== Death ==
He died on March 8, 2007, in a car accident on the Douala-Yaounde highway.

== Legacy ==
Besong was described by Pierre Fandio as “one of the most representative and regular writers of what might be referred to as the second generation of the emergent Cameroonian literature in English". On July 18, 2008, Niyi Osundare paid tribute to Besong with a speech given during the 2008 EduArt Awards for Cameroonian Literature in English.

== Bibliography ==
- Polyphemus Detainee and Other Skulls. Calabar: Scholars Press, 1980.
- The Grain of Bobe Ngom Jua. Yaounde: A Drapoe Publication, 1986.
- The Most Cruel Death of the Talkative Zombie. Limbe: Nooremac Press, 1986.
- Beasts of No Nation. Limbe: Nooremac Press, 1990.
- Obasinjom Warrior with Poems after Detention. Limbe: Alfresco, 1991.
- Requiem for the Last Kaiser. Calabar: Centaur Publishers, 1991.
- The Banquet: A Historical Drama. Markudi Nigeria: Editions Ehi, 1994.
- Just Above Cameroon: Selected Poems 1980-1994. Limbe: Presbook Printing Press, 1998.
- Change Waka and his Man Sawa Boy. Cameroon: Edition Cle, 2001.
- Three Plays. Yaounde: Cle, 2003.
- Disgrace: Autobiographical Narcissus and Emanya-nkpe Collected Poems. Limbe: Design House, 2007.

=== Essays and articles ===
- “Literature in the Season of the Diaspora: Notes to the Anglophone Cameroonian Writer" Nalova Lyonga, Bole Butake, Eckhard Breitinger (ed) Anglophone Cameroon Writing. Bayreuth: RFA/Germany. 5 – 18, 1993
- “Who's Afraid of Anglophone Theatre I & II”. London: West Africa, 7 – 3 July pp 1106 – 1107, 14–20 July 1146,1997.
- “The Limits of a Manichean Vision and the Egoist Hero in Post Colonial Bourgeois Theatre”: Epasa Moto: A Bilingual Journal of Language and Literatures. University of Buea. Vol. 1. No. 479 – 98, 2001.
- “Ontogenesis of Modern Anglophone Cameroon Drama and its Criticism: Excursus”: VOICES The Wisconsin Review of African Languages and Literatures. University of Wisconsin 1414 Van Hise, 1220 Linden Drive, Madison, W1537306 Vol. 1 No. 5 1–19, 2002.
- “ L'Ecrivain est mort: Alas, Poor Ferdinand (Son Excellence Leopold Oyono)' USA: ALA Bulletin A Publication of the African Literature Association. Vol. 28 No. 2 Spring 119–124.

== Related Links ==
Nayi Osundare, Babila Mutia
