= Gisèle Hountondji =

Beninese writer (born 1954)

Gisèle Hountondji (born 1954) is a writer, interpreter, and translator from Benin. She is considered the first Beninese woman writer. Her 1986 autobiographical novel Une citronnelle dans la neige (Lemongrass in the Snow) recounts her often painful years as a student in Europe, particularly in Paris.

== Early life and education ==
Gisèle Léonie Hountondji was born in 1954 in Cotonou, Benin. Her father, a railway inspector, was concerned about her education, so he entrusted her to her paternal aunt whose husband was a teacher. She attended primary school in Paouignan, then secondary school from 1965 to 1972 at the Sainte Jeanne d'Arc school in Abomey.

Hountondji left for Paris to study at the Sorbonne from 1973 to 1978. She also traveled to London and Madrid for language study during this period. She received official certification and a master's degree in Spanish–English translation, then continued studying to be an interpreter at the Polytechnic of Central London, now the University of Westminster. In 1983 she was licensed as a French–English simultaneous conference interpreter, and the following year she became a translator at the Beninese Center for Scientific and Technical Research. She has worked as an interpreter in Cotonou ever since.

== Writing ==
Hountondji's first book, the autobiographical novel Une citronnelle dans la neige (Lemongrass in the Snow), marked a milestone in African literature. Other works, including Kocoumbo, l'étudiant noir (1960) by Aké Loba, Un Nègre à Paris (1959) by Bernard Dadié, and L'Aventure ambiguë (1961) by Cheikh Hamidou Kane, had already addressed the challenges of African students in Paris, but Hountondji was the first writer to depict what it was like to be a black woman in France in the 1970s, after France's African colonies had gained independence. She is considered the first female novelist from Benin.

In the novel, Hountondji's autobiographical protagonist travels to study in France after her father, who was a great admirer of French culture, praised it as a welcoming, free, and civilized country. But when she arrives there in the early 1970s, she discovers a different reality. She faces contempt as she searches for a place to stay and tries to register for a dance class, humiliations that are multiplied by her difficult and disappointing romantic relationship with a young French man. The situation slowly deteriorates, and the once-vibrant young woman slips into a depression.

Stung by her own experiences, Hountondji produced an uncompromising portrait of the French in Une citronnelle dans la neige. According to the critic Adrien Huannou, she perceives them as "inhospitable, contemptuous, brutal, and inhuman toward Blacks and Asians, selfish, ethnocentric, and pretentious, racist." She also describes how science and medicine were employed to reinforce racist ideology.

After Une citronnelle dans la neige, Hountondji has not published any subsequent novels. When asked as to why she stopped writing books, she suggested that there was not an audience for them, dismissively asserting that "Africans, above all the Beninese, do not read." She has, however, published shorter works, including the 1988 essay "Mettez-vous au goût du jour, Madame la négresse : exprimez-vous en français !" ("Get With the Times, Madame Négresse: Express Yourself in French!").

She produced a short story, Daniel, in 1996, and in 2002 she published a series of columns in the newspaper La Nouvelle Tribune. Her work has also been included in anthologies, including La petite fille des eaux in 2006, coordinated by Florent Couao-Zotti.
