= Carlos Alvarado-Larroucau =

Argentine-born French author (born 1964)

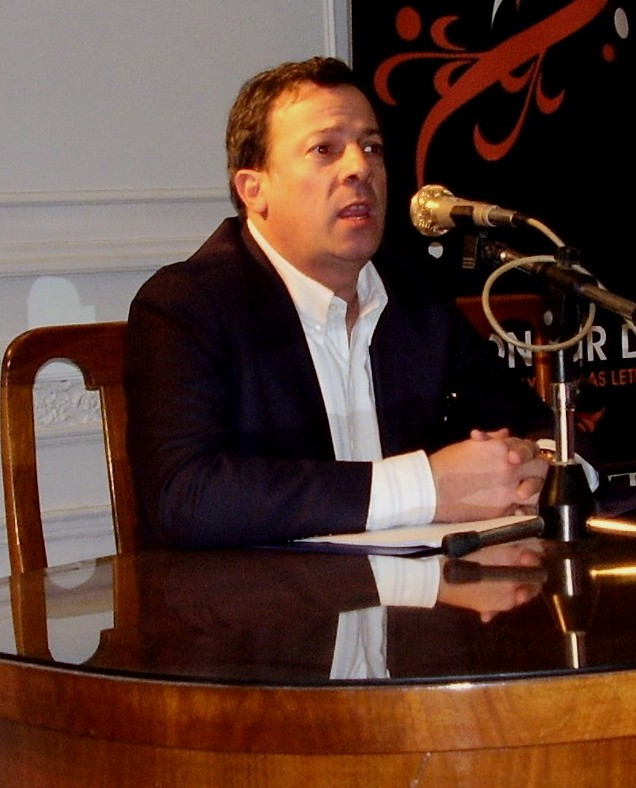
- Alvarado-Larroucau portrait, ca 2007, at Tucumán.
- Born: 1964 (age 61–62); Tucumán, Argentina
- Occupations: Writer, poet, essayist, professor
- Writing career
- Movement: Francophone literature

Carlos Alvarado-Larroucau (born 1964) is an Argentine-born French author.

== Biography ==
After Alvarado-Larroucau completed his secondary education in the province of Tucumán, he settled in Buenos Aires, where he studied languages, philosophy and law. He further pursued his studies for many years in Canada, USA and France.

Alvarado-Larroucau holds a doctorate degree in French Language and Literature from Paris 8 University. He graduated with honors in Comparative Literature and French Literature at the University of Montreal, Canada, having obtained a fellowship from the Ministry of Education of Quebec. He earned a diploma with honors from Florida International University in the United States, and the Sorbonne University and Paris 8 University in France.

Alvarado-Larroucau lectures at several universities and colleges in Argentina and publishes on literature in specialized media. He has been a visiting professor at other worldwide universities. He is a member of the Golden Key International Honour Society, International PEN, PEN of Algeria, of the "Gens de Lettres de Paris" and other academic, literature, cultural and social institutions.

Alvarado-Larroucau is a specialist in Francophone literature of Argentina, the Maghreb, Mashrek, and Africa. He has published in Spanish and French, and is considered an Argentinean Francophone author.

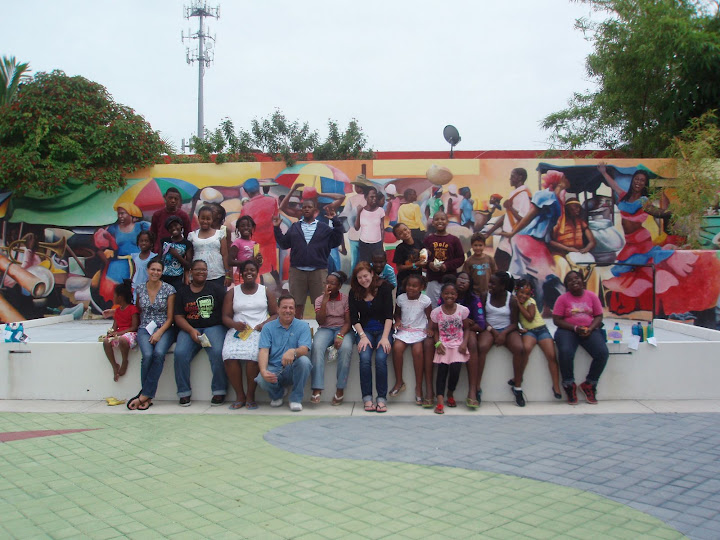
Alvarado-Larroucau and students, Miami.

He participates in the French Heritage Language Program, which is designed to support and enrich the teaching and learning of French language, literature, and culture for students of Francophone background. FHLP is a program of the French American Cultural Exchange, with the Cultural Services of the French Embassy in New York and the French Embassy in the U.S.

At present he translates the French poetry of Etel Adnan and Samira Negrouche, and conducts research on francophone Latin American literature. And he is working on a poetic performance with Natalia Grima, pianist.

== Awards ==
- 1999: "Fleur de Lys" of the French Society of Huguenots of Florida.
- 2003: First Prize, Diploma of Honor, in the contest "Petits Poèmes en Prose" of La Sorbonne.
- 2008: Honorable Mention of the SADE (Sociedad Argentina de Escritores), Sade Calchaquies Valley chapter. Best book of poems published in Tucumán in 2007 for his book Con Tinta de amapolas
- 2008: Menzione d'onore, Città di Voghera. Honorable Mention of the city of Voghera, Comune di Voghera, (Italy), for his article "Ernesto Nava", published in the book Italianos en Tucumán, Historias de vida.

== Comments on his work ==
About his poetry, Argentinian Professor Adrian Baró stated:

It would be impossible not to find in the poetry of Alvarado, some echoes some that are unique to the French literature he studies. Like other French-speaking writers, he has exchanged ideas intimately with the great Gallic poets like Saint-John Perse, Max Jacob and Mallarmé; and absorbed a certain amount of unavoidable melancholy reading Proust. In Alvarado work there is a certain lyricism inherited from romanticism "that never stops". […] In his work there is an aspiration to achieve a powerful synthesis, evoking an inside atmosphere from the mere observation of the simple things in the manner of Rilke, and this is visible in several of his poems such as in "what trivial: the perfect, the fleeting: the eternal ". The poet says to all "Tucumán", and so is his word, his utterance is loaded with nuances of his country, with some way to express itself to the whole region of northwest Argentina. Doubtless the poet knows the works of poets tucumanos Pablo Rojas Paz, Omar Estrella and Ariadna Chaves, among others. His verse, like that of the poets of his land, is carefree adjectives as austere as accurate.

— Published in Diario Central de Poesía, San Isidro, Buenos Aires, December 2007.

== Conferences ==
- 03/2012 "Assia Djebar, académicienne en marge, "francographe" par réflexion". Lycée International de Ferney-Voltaire, France.
- 11/2011 "La Littérature francophone d'Argentine", Embassy of Lebanon in Argentina.
- 10/2010 "Joubert à la lumière de Foucault et la pensée du dehors", IV International Symposium Joseph Joubert, Sens (Yonne), France.
- 09/2009 "L'enfant de sable, (The Sand Child) of Tahar Ben Jelloun, Morocco in Buenos Aires. Francophone homage to Borges poet. Borges-France Colloquium. IV International Symposium of Comparative Literature, Catholic University of Argentina. Buenos Aires.
- 03/2009 "Écrivains Argentins d'expression française sur les poètes: Maria Isabel Biedma et Susana Calandrelli, francophone Literature of Argentine, from 1869 to 2009." Alianza Francesa de Buenos Aires.
- 12/2008 "Traduire la littérature algerienne de langue française. Le silence au cœur d'un système de représentation purement algérien." Algiers (Algeria).
- 09/2008 "Assia Djebar, an Algerian writer in the French Academy. Alberto Rouges Cultural Center, Tucuman.
- 07/2008 "Assia Djebar, an Algerian writer in the French Academy. Alliance Française of Buenos Aires.
- 11/2007 "From life to death. Egyptian rites and ceremonies from birth to death. Exploring the Egyptian tales. Cultural entity of the Province of Tucumán, Tafi del Valle (Tucumán).
- 05/2007 "The identity, a recurring theme of an emerging literature. Poesia French expression Mashreq. IIIrd May of Letters in Tucuman, The Ministry of Culture of the Province of Tucuman. Tucuman.

== Bibliography ==
=== Books ===
- Des cours d'eau. Paris: L'Harmattan (Coll. Poètes des cinq continents), 2013.
- Je suis aussi ..., preface by Dominique Barbéris, Paris: L'Harmattan (Coll. Poètes des cinq continents), 2009.
- Poèmes, a bilingual edition, French-Arabic, Algiers: Artistique, 2009.
- Écritures Palestiniennes francophones. Quête d'identité en espace néoloconial. Paris: L'Harmattan (Coll. Critiques littéraires), 2009.
- Con tinta de amapolas (poetry). Yerba Buena, Tucumán, Argentine: Lucio Pierola Ediciones, 2007.

=== Anthologies and joint works ===
- « Lisandro Alvarado», Hace Tiempo en el Noroeste t.III, éd. Alba Omil, Yerba Buena (Tucumán): Lucio Piérola Ediciones, 2010.
- "Écrire ces vers" and "Tatuajes y cuerpos escritos", in Aturucuto, nº1, San Miguel de Tucumán: Argentina, novembre 2009.
- "Poemas para una noche quieta," in Espejos del tiempo, espejos del alma, anthology, Yerba Buena: Lucio Pierola Editions, 2009.
- "Preface critical", in Maria Elisa Gallo: Teclas Negras, Yerba Buena: Lucio Pierola Editions, 2008.
- "Stories and Poems," in Escritores de Tucumán, siglo XXI, an anthology of writers from Tucuman, joint work, Yerba Buena: Lucio Pierola Editions, 2008.
- "Ernesto Nava" in OMIL Alba (ed.): Italianos de Tucuman, historias de vida (joint work, biographies). Yerba Buena: Lucio Pierola Ediciones, 2007.

=== Articles and academic texts ===
- On female genital mutilation and silence in French African literature. Online, in French for Excision, parlons-en!, 08/29/2013.
- "Joubert à la lumière de Foucault et la pensée du dehors", Jean-Luc Dauphin et Ariane Lüthi (éds.), Actes du 4e Colloque Joseph Joubert, Villeneuve-sur-Yonne, 2011.
- El Niño de arena, de Marruecos a Buenos Aires. Homenaje francófono a Borges poeta, Magdalena Cámpora, Javier R. González (éds.), Borges-Francia, Selectus, UCA (Universidad Católica Argentina), 2011.
- Pablo de Santis. Los Anticuarios, Gramma, Año XXI, nº47, 2010 Fac de Filosofía y Letras, Universidad del Salvador, 2010.
- Les Précieuses argentines. Littérature francophone d'Argentine Francophonie, nº 18, University of Cádiz, 2009.
- "Traduire la littérature algérienne de langue française. Le silence au cœur d'un système de représentation purement algérien. International Journal of Translation in Modern Research Laboratory, Languages and Translation at the Faculty of Arts, Languages and Arts. Department of Translation. Mentouri Constantine University, Algeria, No. 4, July 2009.
- "Jean-Marie Adiaffi et sa carte d'identité. Une identité et à chercher à défendre "in Philanthropies (Journal of African and Africanist students at the Sorbonne). Paris: ADEAS, No. 3, February 2005.
- ALVARADO-LARROUCAU, papers.
