= Prix Ahmadou-Kourouma =

The Prix Ahmadou-Kourouma is a Swiss literary prize in French language literature created in 2004, awarded annually by the Geneva International Book and Press Fair. The prize, named after Ivorian writer Ahmadou Kourouma, is given to a fiction or essay book on sub-Saharan Africa.

== Prize winners ==
| Year | Author | Title | Publisher (x times) | Country | Notes | Ref. |
|---|---|---|---|---|---|---|
| 2004 | Esther Mujawayo and Souâd Belhaddad | Survivantes. Rwanda, dix ans après le génocide | Éditions de l'Aube | Rwanda | | |
| 2005 | Tanella Boni | Matins de couvre-feu | Le Serpent à plumes | Ivory Coast | | |
| 2006 | Koffi Kwahulé | Babyface | Éditions Gallimard | Ivory Coast | | |
| 2007 | Sami Tchak | Le Paradis des chiots | Mercure de France | Togo | | |
| 2008 | Nimrod | le Bal des princes | Actes Sud | Chad | | |
| 2009 | Kossi Efoui | Solo d'un revenant | Éditions du Seuil | Togo | | |
| 2010 | Florent Couao-Zotti | Si la cour du mouton est sale, ce n’est pas au porc de le dire | Le Serpent à plumes | Benin | | |
| 2011 | Emmanuel Dongala | Photo de groupe au bord du fleuve | Actes Sud | Republic of the Congo | | |
| 2012 | Scholastique Mukasonga | Notre-Dame du Nil | Éditions Gallimard | Rwanda | | |
| 2013 | Tierno Monénembo | Le Terroriste noir | Éditions du Seuil | Guinea | | |
| 2014 | Mutt-Lon | Ceux qui sortent dans la nuit | Éditions Grasset | Cameroon | | |
| 2015 | Mohamed Mbougar Sarr | Terre ceinte | Présence africaine | Senegal | | |
| 2016 | Mbarek Ould Beyrouk | Le Tambour des larmes | Éditions Elyzad | Mauritania | | |
| 2017 | Max Lobe | Confidences | Éditions Zoé | Cameroon | | |
| 2018 | Wilfried N'Sondé | Un océan, deux mers, trois continents | Actes Sud | Republic of the Congo | | |
| 2019 | David Diop | Frère d'âme | Éditions du Seuil | France | | |
| 2020 | Hemley Boum | Les jours viennent et passent | Éditions Gallimard | Cameroon | | |
| 2021 | Blaise Ndala | Dans le ventre du Congo | Mémoire d'encrier / Éditions du Seuil | Democratic Republic of the Congo | | |
| 2022 | Osvalde Lewat | Les aquatiques | Editions Les Escales | Cameroon | | |
| 2023 | Beata Umubyeyi Mairesse | Consolée | Editions Autrement | Rwanda | | |
| 2024 | Bessora | Vous, les ancêtres | Editions J-C Lattès | Gabon | | |
