= Noël Nétonon Ndjékéry =

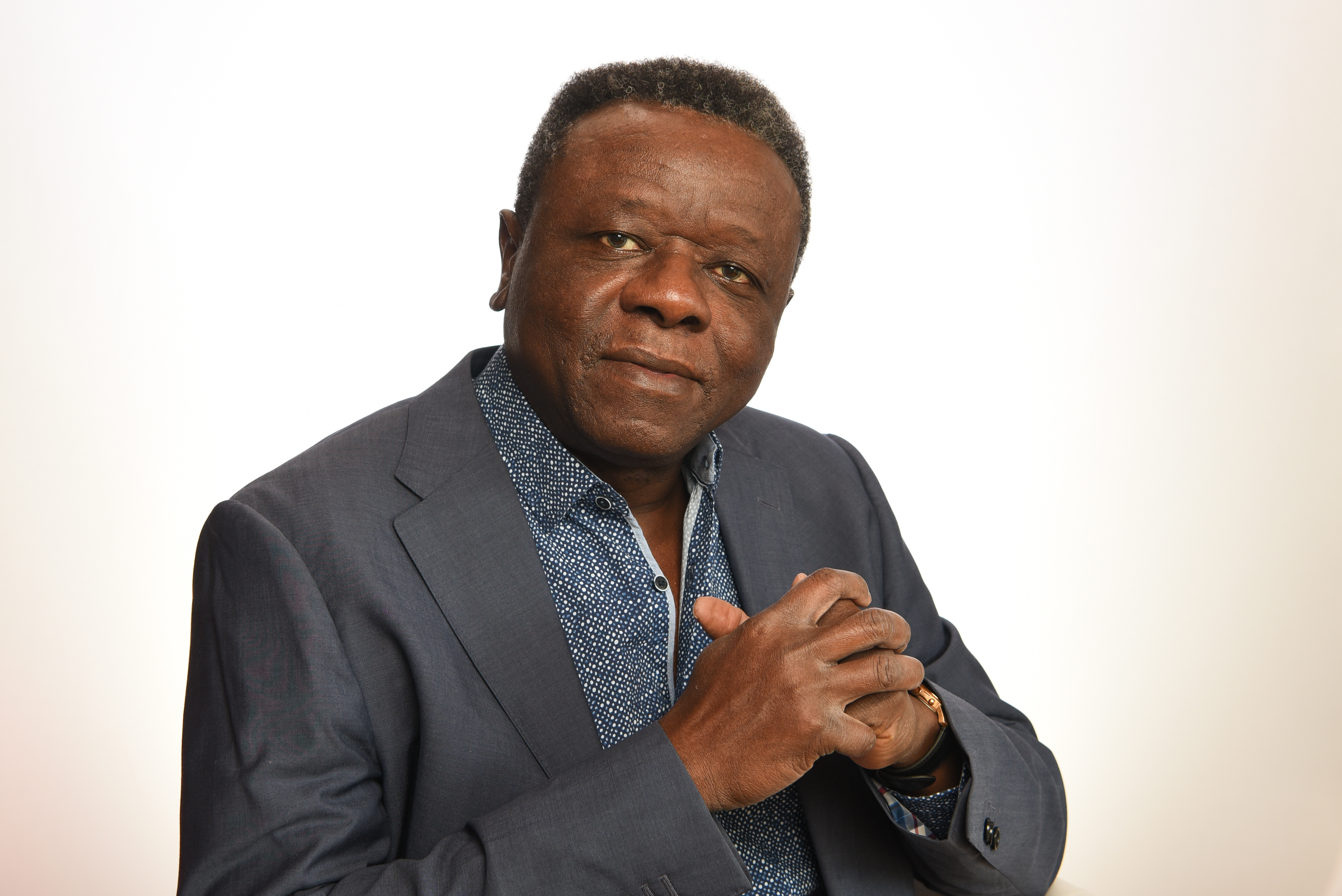
Noël Nétonon Ndjékéry (2019)

Noël Nétonon Ndjékéry, born 25 December 1956 in Moundou, is a Chadian and Swiss writer. With his work, he aims to "bring to all continents his sub-Saharan way of looking, feeling and speaking about the world".

== Biography ==
Noël Nétonon Ndjékéry grew up in Moundou, Chad. He studied mathematics and settled in Switzerland, where he worked as a computer scientist. His first novel, Sang de kola, was published in 1999. He started writing poems and short stories as a teenager, inspired by both Chadian griots and his experience of using his French skills to help illiterate Chadians.

In 2017, he won the Grand Prix littéraire national du Tchad for his body of work.

In 2022, in an interview with Le Monde, Noël Nétonon Ndjékéry cited the following works that had an impact on him: Discourse on Colonialism by Aimé Césaire, The Suns of Independence by Ahmadou Kourouma, Chronicle of a Death Foretold by Gabriel García Márquez and An Essay on the Inequality of the Human Races by Arthur de Gobineau.

== Works ==
=== Novels ===
- Sang de kola (L'Harmattan, 1999)
- Chroniques tchadiennes (Infolio, 2008)
- Mosso (Infolio, 2011)
- Au petit bonheur la brousse (Hélice Hélas, 2019)
- Il n'y a pas d'arc-en-ciel au paradis (Hélice Hélas, 2022)
- L'angle mort du rêve (La contre allée, 2024)
- La fabrique du merveilleux (Hélice Hélas, 2026)

=== Short story collections ===
- La descente aux enfers (1993)
- La minute mongole (2014)
- Le pique-boeuf sur la bosse du zébu (2021)

== Awards and honors ==
- 2017: Grand Prix littéraire national du Tchad
- 2022: Prix Hors Concours, for Il n'y a pas d'arc-en-ciel au paradis
- 2022: Grand prix littéraire d'Afrique noire, for Il n'y a pas d'arc-en-ciel au paradis
- 2023: Prix Lettres frontière, for Il n'y a pas d'arc-en-ciel au paradis
