= Grand prix Afrique =

Annual literary prize

Grand Prix littéraire de l’Afrique noire
- Country: France
- Presented by: Association des écrivains de langue française
- First award: 1960
- Website: http://web.me.com/tomaloc/AFN/LE_REGLEMENT.html

The Grand prix Afrique, previously known as the Grand prix littéraire d'Afrique noire (one of the major literary prizes of Black Africa for Francophone Literature) is a literary prize presented every year by the ADELF, the Association of French Language Writers for a French original text from Sub-Saharan Africa. It was originally endowed with 2,000 french francs.

== Winners ==
- 1961: Aké Loba (Côte d'Ivoire) for Kocumbo, l'étudiant noir
- 1962: Cheikh Hamidou Kane (Senegal) for L'Aventure ambiguë
- 1963: Jean Ikelle Matiba (Cameroon) for Cette Afrique-là
- 1964: Birago Diop (Senegal) for Contes et Lavanes
- 1965: Bernard Dadié (Côte d'Ivoire) for Patron de New-York
- 1965: Seydou Badian Kouyaté (Mali) for Les Dirigeants africains face à leurs peuples
- 1966: Olympe Bhêly-Quenum (Benin) for Le Chant du lac
- 1967: Francis Bebey (Cameroon) for Le fils d'Agatha Moudio
- 1967: Francois Evembe (Cameroon) for Sur la terre en passant
- 1967: Jean Pliya (Benin) for Kondo, le requin
- 1968: Bernard Dadié (Côte d'Ivoire) for La ville où nul ne meurt
- 1968: Francis Bebey (Cameroon) for Le Fils d'Agatha Moudio
- 1969: Ahmadou Kourouma (Côte d'Ivoire) for Les Soleils des indépendances
- 1969: Guy Menga (Republic of the Congo) for La Palabre stérile
- 1971: Boubou Hama (Niger) for Kotia Nima
- 1971: Massa Makan Diabaté (Mali) for Janjon
- 1971: L'abbé Mviena (Cameroon) for L'Univers culturel et religieux du peuple Béti
- 1972: Henri Lopès (Democratic Republic of Congo) for Tribaliques
- 1973: Alioun Fantoure (Guinea) for Le Cercle des tropiques
- 1974: Amadou Hampâté Bâ (Mali) for L'Étrange Destin de Wangrin
- 1975: Étienne Yanou (Cameroon) for L'Homme Dieu de Bisso
- 1976: Aouta Keita (Mali) for Femmes d'Afrique
- 1977: Sory Camara (Guinea) for Gens de la parole: Essai sur les griots malinké
- 1978: Idé Oumarou (Niger) for Gros plan
- 1979: Lamine Diakhate (Senegal) for Chalys d'Harlem
- 1980: Aminata Sow Fall (Senegal) for La grève des Bàttu
- 1981: Jean-Marie Adiaffi (Côte d'Ivoire) for La carte d'identité
- 1982: Frédéric Titinga Pacéré (Burkina Faso) for La poésie des griots : poèmes pour l'Angola
- 1982: Mariama Bâ (Senegal) for Un Chant écarlate
- 1982: Yodi Karone (Cameroon) for Nègre de paille
- 1983: Sony Labou Tansi (Democratic Republic of the Congo) for L'Anté-peuple
- 1984: Cheikh Hamidou Kane (Senegal)
- 1985: Modibo Sounkalo Keita (Mali) for L'archer bassari
- 1985: Edem Kodjo (Togo) for Et demain l'Afrique
- 1986: Jean-Pierre Makouta-Mboukou (Congo) for La Critique littéraire
- 1986: Bolga Baenga (Congo) for Cannibale
- 1986: Tierno Monénembo (Guinea) for Les écailles du ciel
- 1987: Jean-Baptiste Tati Loutard (Republic of the Congo) for Le Récit de la mort
- 1988: Emmanuel Dongala (Democratic Republic of the Congo) for Le feu des origines
- 1989: Victor Bouadjio (France) for Demain est encore loin
- 1990: Henri Lopès (Democratic Republic of the Congo)
- 1990: Ahmadou Kourouma (Côte d'Ivoire) for Monnè, outrages et defis
- 1991: Amadou Hampâté Bâ (Mali) for Amkullel, l'enfant peul and L'empire peul du Macina
- 1991: Kama Sywor Kamanda (Democratic Republic of the Congo) for La nuit des griots
- 1992: Patrick Ilboudo (Burkina Faso) for Le héraut têtu
- 1993: Maurice Bandaman (Côte d'Ivoire) for Le fils de la femme male
- 1994: Calixthe Beyala (Cameroon) for Maman a un amant
- 1995: Emmanuel Dongala (Democratic Republic of the Congo)
- 1995: Sylvain Ntari-Bemba (Democratic Republic of the Congo) for Reves portatifs
- 1996: Abdourahman A. Waberi (Djibouti) for Cahier nomade
- 1996: Léopold Sédar Senghor (Senegal) for Anthologie de la nouvelle poesie negre et malgache de langue francaise
- 1997: Daniel Biyaoula (Republic of the Congo) for L'impasse
- 1998: Gaston-Paul Effa (Cameroon) for Mâ
- 1999: Alain Mabanckou (Republic of the Congo) for Bleu-Blanc-Rouge (novel)
- 2000: Ken Bugul (Benin) for Riwan ou le chemin de sable
- 2001: Kossi Efoui (Togo) for La Fabrique de cérémonies
- 2002: Patrice Nganang (Cameroun) for Temps de chien (Le Serpent à Plumes)
- 2003: Kangni Alem (Togo) for Cola Cola jazz
- 2004: Sami Tchak (Togo) for Littérature et engagement: Mongo Beti, un écrivain conscient de son devoir envers son peuple? and Togoo: la démocratie introuvable
- 2005: Véronique Tadjo (Côte d'Ivoire) for Reine Pokou
- 2005: Mahamoudou Ouédraogo (Burkina Faso) for Roogo
- 2006: Edem Awumey (Togo) for Port Mélo
- 2007: Bessora (Gabon) for Cueillez-moi jolis Messieurs...
- 2008: Jean Divassa Nyama (Gabon) for Vocation de Dignité
- 2009: In Koli Jean Bofane for Mathématiques congolaises
- 2010: Gabriel Mwéné Okoundji (Republic of the Congo) for L’äme blessée d’un éléphant noir
- 2011: Léonora Miano (Cameroon) for Blues pour l’Afrique and Ces âmes chagrines
- 2012: Venance Konan (Côte d'Ivoire) for Edem Kodjo, un homme, un destin
- 2013: Augustin Emane (Gabon / France) for Docteur Schweitzer, une icône africaine
- 2014: Eugène Ébodé (Cameroon) for Souveraine magnifique.
- 2015: Hemley Boum (Cameroon) for Les maquisards
- 2016: Blick Bassy (Cameroon) for Le Moabi Cinéma
- 2017: Aristide Tarnagda (Burkina Faso) for Terre rouge
- 2018: Timba Bema (Cameroon) for Les seins de l’amante and Armand Gauz (Côte d'Ivoire) for Camarade Papa
- 2022: Noël Nétonon Ndjékéry (Chad) for Il n'y a pas d'arc-en-ciel au paradis
- 2023: Dibakana Mankessi (Republic of the Congo) for Psychanalyste de Brazzaville
- 2024: Hemley Boum (Cameroon) for Le rêve du pêcheur
- 2025: In Koli Jean Bofane (Democratic Republic of Congo) for Nation Cannibale
