= Diakhaté =

Diakhaté or Diakhate is a surname. Notable people with the surname include:

- Adama Diakhaté (born 1970), Senegalese basketball player
- Lamine Diakhate (1928–1987), Senegalese writer and diplomat
- Ndèye Coumba Mbengue Diakhaté (1924–2001), Senegalese educator and poet
- Pape Diakhaté (born 1984), Senegalese footballer
- Pape Moussa Diakhatè (born 1989), Senegalese footballer
