= La ville où nul ne meurt =

Novel by Bernard Dadié

- Language: French
- Publication place: Côte d'Ivoire

La ville où nul ne meurt is a novel by Ivorian author Bernard Dadié, originally published in the Présence Africaine. It won the Grand prix littéraire d'Afrique noire in 1968.
