= Nidra =

Nidra may refer to:

- Nidra (1981 film), an Indian Malayalam-language film directed by Bharathan
- Nidra (2012 film), an Indian Malayalam-language remake of the 1981 film, directed by Sidharth Bharathan
- Yoga nidra, or yogic sleep
- Nidra Beard (died 2023), American singer with the band Dynasty
- Nidra Poller (born 1935), American author
