= Venance =

Venance is a given name. Notable people with the name include:

- Venance Grumel (1890–1967), French theologian
- Venance Konan (born 1958), Ivorian journalist
- Venance Salvatory Mabeyo, Tanzanian military officer
- Venance Payot (1826–1902), French naturalist
- Venance Zézé (born 1981), Ivorian footballer

== See also ==
- Gabriel Venance Rey (1763–1836), French general
