= Climbié =

Climbié may refer to:

- Climbié, a book by Bernard Binlin Dadié
- Victoria Climbié, a girl whose murder produced major changes in child protection policies in England
