= La fête des masques =

Book by Sami Tchak

- Author: Sami Tchak
- Language: French
- Publication date: 2004
- Publication place: Togo

La fête des masques is a novel by Togolese author Sami Tchak. It won the Grand prix littéraire d'Afrique noire in 2004.
