= Hountondji =

Hountondji is a surname. Notable people with the surname include:

- Andréas Hountondji (born 2002), Beninese footballer
- Cédric Hountondji (born 1994), Beninese footballer
- Gisèle Hountondji (born 1954), Beninese writer, interpreter, and translator
- Paulin J. Hountondji (born 1942), Beninese philosopher and politician
