= Monnè, outrages et defis =

1990 novel by Ahmadou Kourouma

- Author: Ahmadou Kourouma
- Language: French
- Publication date: 1990
- Publication place: Côte d'Ivoire

Monnè, outrages et defis is a novel by Ivorian author Ahmadou Kourouma. It was first published in 1990 by Éditions du Seuil in its original language. In 1993, Mercury House published the English translation, Monnew, by Nidra Poller. The word "monnew" is derived from the pre-existing Malinke term monnè and has a variety of meanings such as "humiliation, insult, outrage, contempt, fury," and more. It won the Grand prix littéraire d'Afrique noire in 1990.

== Plot ==
The novel depicts how underdeveloped Africa was subjected to constant pillage by colonial France through a fictional land called Soba. They are a closed society that carries on elaborate ritualistic traditions. Their modes of living is disrupted with the arrival of French colonisers. The plot is built upon what the Djigui Keita and people of Soba endures within this period.
