= Le Fils de-la-femme-mâle =

1993 novel by Maurice Bandaman

Le fils de la femme male
- Author: Maurice Bandaman
- Language: French
- Publication date: 1993
- Publication place: Côte d'Ivoire

Le fils de la femme male is a novel by Ivorian author Maurice Bandaman. It won the Grand prix littéraire d'Afrique noire in 1993.
