= Patron de New-York =

1964 French-language African novel

- Author: Bernard Dadié
- Language: French
- Publication date: 1964
- Publication place: Côte d'Ivoire

Patron de New-York is a novel by Ivorian author Bernard Dadié. It won the Grand prix littéraire d'Afrique noire in 1965.
