= The Black Cloth =

Collection of African folk tales

Front cover of 1987 English-language edition.

The Black Cloth (French title Le Pagne Noir: Contes Africains) is a collection of African folk tales by Bernard Binlin Dadié. It was first published in 1955, in French; an English translation by Karen C. Hatch was published in 1987. The stories were published at a time when many African writers (including Dadié and such authors as Birago Diop) were creating a new outlet for traditional African art, converting oral literature into written literature, and adapting writing to convey the tradition of orality.

== Background ==
The 1940s and 1950s saw a great wave of African prose literature, a time that gave rise to "the African novel". At the same time, writers sought to express the more traditional oral prose in print, and to somehow make up for the loss of "an atmosphere warmed with music, handclapping, laughter, dancing, and singing". Prose authors sought ways of "embellishing and enriching" their narratives. Senegalese author Birago Diop, who published Tales of Amadou Koumba in 1947, was one of the forerunners in this genre. Diop, however, rendered tales by one particular griot; Dadié chose to dispense with some aspects of tradition—he did away with some of the traditional structural devices (such as the lengthy introductory and closing formulas), and some of his stories were original creations. Authors who followed Diop and Dadié in that tradition include Hama Tuma.

== Contents ==
Of the sixteen tales in the collection, three are by Dadié himself: "The Mirror of Dearth", "The Black Cloth", and "The Man Who Wanted to be King". Ten of the stories involve Anansi the spider, the West-African trickster character; these are "generally in a light vein". Two are initiation tales involving orphans who are driven to perform seemingly impossible tasks by their stepmothers. Both orphans are courageous and take up their task willingly, and their stories have happy endings; both "initiation routes start from a known place to an unknown destination from where they return to the known place". The stories Dadié reworked from oral tradition were originally in Anyin, Nzema, "and other vernacular idioms", according to Robert Farris Thompson (who does not, however, note that Dadié invented three of the stories).

=== Table of tales ===
1. The Mirror of Dearth
2. The Black Cloth
3. The Pitcher
4. Spider's Hump
5. L'Enfant Terrible
6. Spider's Ox
7. Spider and the Tortoise
8. Mother Iguana's Funeral
9. The Pig's Snout
10. The Hunter and the Boa
11. The Sacred Cow
12. The Bat's Relations
13. The Yam Field
14. The Dowry

Three of the stories were included in the second edition of the Norton Anthology of World Literature: "The Mirror of Dearth", "The Black Cloth", and "The Hunter and the Boa. They were excised from the third edition. Selections were included in Nommo: African Fiction in French South of the Sahara by John D. Erickson.

=== Allegory and New World connections ===
The title story features a young orphan girl named AÏwa, whose mother has died and whose stepmother sends her on an impossible mission: to wash a black cloth until it is white. The girl, always singing and smiling, succeeds, after she sings to her mother and thereby invokes her. Her mother gives her a white cloth (later recognized as one of the pieces of fabric she was buried in), and AÏwa returns. Thompson comments: "A sacred fabric, symbolic of the spiritual purity and power of the otherworldly, restores a child to her social status, links her once more with her mother and, through her mother's marriage and funeral rites, with her father. For me this story reads like a redemptive allegory of blacks going back across the waters of the diaspora in search of the family ties and history severed by the slave trade".

Thompson also points to the many connections between The Black Cloth and the Americas, beginning with the trickster character Kacou Ananze, as Dadié calls Anansi, who also occurs in literature of the Caribbean and, in the American Deep South, is found as Aunt Nancy, and "teach[es] people to overcome adversity by wit—which can be a very precious gift indeed". The silk-cotton tree occurs frequently in the stories, and is also found in African-Cuban folk tales; finally, there are many similarities in the dishes described by Dadié and the Creole cuisine of New Orleans and other places around the Gulf of Mexico.

== Style and literary critiques ==
According to the translator, Karen Hatch, and a critic, Evelyn Uhrhan Irving, these stories are "twice removed from the original oral tales", since they were first transmitted from orality to print, and then from French to English. Nonetheless, according to Irving, "these are delightful, linguistically vivid tales". Hatch found that although the stories "owe much in their design to the expressive features and general structural patterns of the oral story-telling tradition", she also saw a distinct resemblance to the work of Guy de Maupassant, who, along with Victor Hugo, was much admired by Dadié.

Martial Kokroa Frindéthié comments that "Francophone African expressive prose is very digressive and repetitive", and illustrates this with citations from "The Pitcher", one of the stories involving an orphan—in this case, a boy, Koffi, who broke his stepmother's pitcher and is forced to leave home. The ideas of leaving and suffering are repeated in consecutive paragraphs; the paragraphs have recurring coordinate sentences, and the sentences have recurring verb clusters.

While Dadié did not keep all the structural aspects of the traditional oral tales, he did retain, for instance, some of the songs (in Nzema), and the onomatopoeic sounds used traditionally, "such as Tortoise walking: Clouk! clak! or Kakou Ananzè sharpening his hatchet before the terrified squirrel: Kochio! kochio!" Thompson comments on these adaptations too and on the descriptions of natural phenomena (which he deems "faithful to tradition"), and adds that the collection "demonstrates the sophisticated taste for song, epic, pun, riddle, satire and praise poem characteristic of African peoples south of the Sahara". Thompson also praises "Ms. Hatch's superbly unobtrusive translation".

=== Négritude ===
Whether Dadié and this collection were part of the Négritude movement or not is a matter of some discussion. Irving said "he differs from many of other black writers...in that he never joined the Negritude movement"; Charlotte Bruner, however, called him one of the "so-called 'founders' of the Negritude movement". Clive Walker says "Dadié, as author of The Black Cloth..., belongs to the 'Negritude' generation", and explains:

"many French-speaking black writers of the 1950s sought to establish the value of African culture in the face of France's arrogant assertion in its colonies of its cultural superiority. In this context, the transposition of African folktales into modern French was entirely logical. In response to the French assumption of moral superiority, these tales reflected the wisdom of an ordered society which saw the intimate connection between morality and common-sense, while they incorporated the highest level of imagination and a rigorous sense of style and form. They were also an expression of the African sense of community (a major Negritude concept), since they closely involved the audience in the telling".
