= Esther Mujawayo =

Rwandan sociologist and psychotherapist (born 1958)

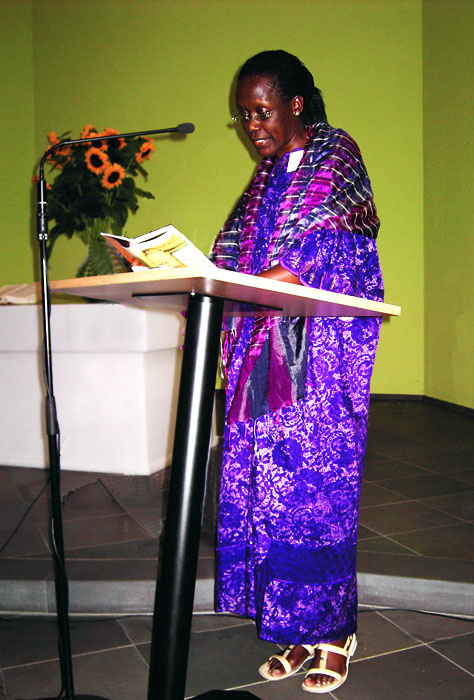
Esther Mujawayo- Keiner, writer from Rwanda, at a lecture in Duesseldorf (2007)

Esther Mujawayo (born 1958) is a Rwandan sociologist and psychotherapist. She survived the Rwanda genocide against the Tutsi in 1994, but lost many members of her family. She is the author of several books. In 1994, she founded the Association of Widows of the Rwandan Genocide. She gained a Graduate Diploma in Psychology from the University of East Anglia in 1997.

== Works ==
- Mujawayo, Esther; Belhaddad, Souâd; Veil, Simone (2004). Survivantes. Rwanda, dix ans après le génocide. Aube: La Tour d'Aigues.
  2004 Prix Ahmadou-Kourouma · 2004 Prix Ville du Cannet
- Mujawayo, Esther; Belhaddad, Souâd (2006). La fleur de Stéphanie. Rwanda entre réconcialition et déni. Paris: Flammarion.

== See also ==
- Women's World Award
