= Hemley Boum =

Cameroonian writer (born 1973)

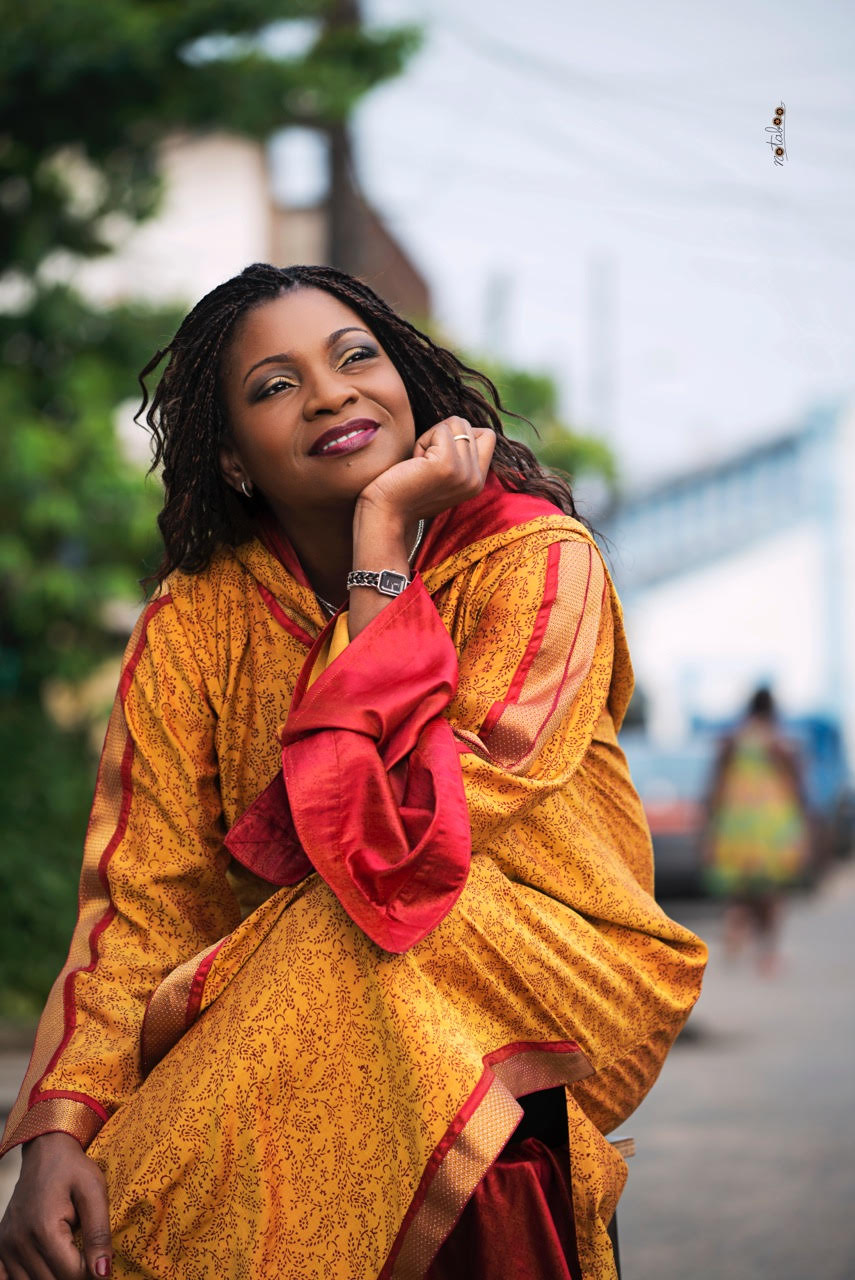
- Born: 1973 (age 52–53); Douala, Cameroon
- Education: Catholic University of Central Africa (MA); Lille Catholic University
- Occupation: Novelist

Hemley Boum (born 1973) is a Cameroonian novelist. She has received a number of notable awards for her novels, including the Grand prix littéraire d'Afrique noire, the Prix Les Afriques and the Prix Ahmadou-Kourouma. Her novels have been translated into Dutch and English.

== Life and career ==
Boum was born in 1973 in Douala, Cameroon. Her mother was a French teacher, and she was the eldest of five children. Growing up, she read European writers at school; she has said "African authors were markedly absent, even in libraries".

Boum studied Social Sciences at the Catholic University of Central Africa in Yaoundé, graduating with a master's degree. She subsequently studied international trade at the Lille Catholic University and obtained a qualification in marketing and quality from another institution in Lille. In 2009, she moved to Paris with her husband and two children.

Boum has publicly advocated for greater recognition of Cameroon's independence war and for forgotten nationals figures.. In interviews, she has explained that her novels deliberately center “anonymous” people rather than famous historical figures, especially in Les Maquisards, where she reconstructs the experiences of ordinary Cameroonian's during the independence struggle

Boum has published five novels as of 2024. She started writing her first novel, Le Clan des femmes, online in blog form. It was published as a book in 2010 and tells the story of an African woman in the early 20th century based on Boum's memories of her grandmother. It also dealt with the topic of polygamy. Boum's second novel, Si d'aimer..., received the Prix Ivoire award in 2013. Her third novel, Les maquisards, is a historical novel about Cameroon's independence struggles. It received the Grand prix littéraire d'Afrique noire and the Prix Les Afriques in 2016.

In 2019, Boum's fourth novel, Les jours viennent et passent, was published. It is about the lives of three generations of Cameroonian women and the impacts of extremism in Cameroon. It won the Prix Ahmadou-Kourouma in 2020. An English translation, Days Come and Go, was published by Bakwa Books in the United States in 2022. Her fifth novel, Le Rêve du pêcheur (The Fisherman's Dream), was published in 2024 and deals with themes of mental healh and intergenerational trauma. The same year, the Sciences Po Alumni association awarded its first literary prize to Hemley Boum thanks to this novel. In 2025, the Association of French-Language Writers awarded its Grand prix Afrique to Hemley Boum for her novel Le Rêve du pêcheur.

== Works ==
- Le Clan des femmes, Paris: L'Harmattan, 2010 ISBN 978-2-296-12847-7
- Si d'aimer…, Ciboure: La Cheminante, 2012 ISBN 978-2-917598-69-6
- Les maquisards, Ciboure: La Cheminante, 2015 ISBN 978-2-371270-22-0
- Les jours viennent et passent, Paris: Gallimard, 2019, ISBN 978-2-07-284918-3
  - (Dutch translation: De dagen komen en gaan, 2020, ISBN 978-949308173-4)
  - (English translation: Days Come and Go, 2022, ISBN 978-1-7337526-9-5)
- Le Rêve du pêcheur, Paris: Gallimard, Collection Blanche, 2024, ISBN 978-2-07-303242-3

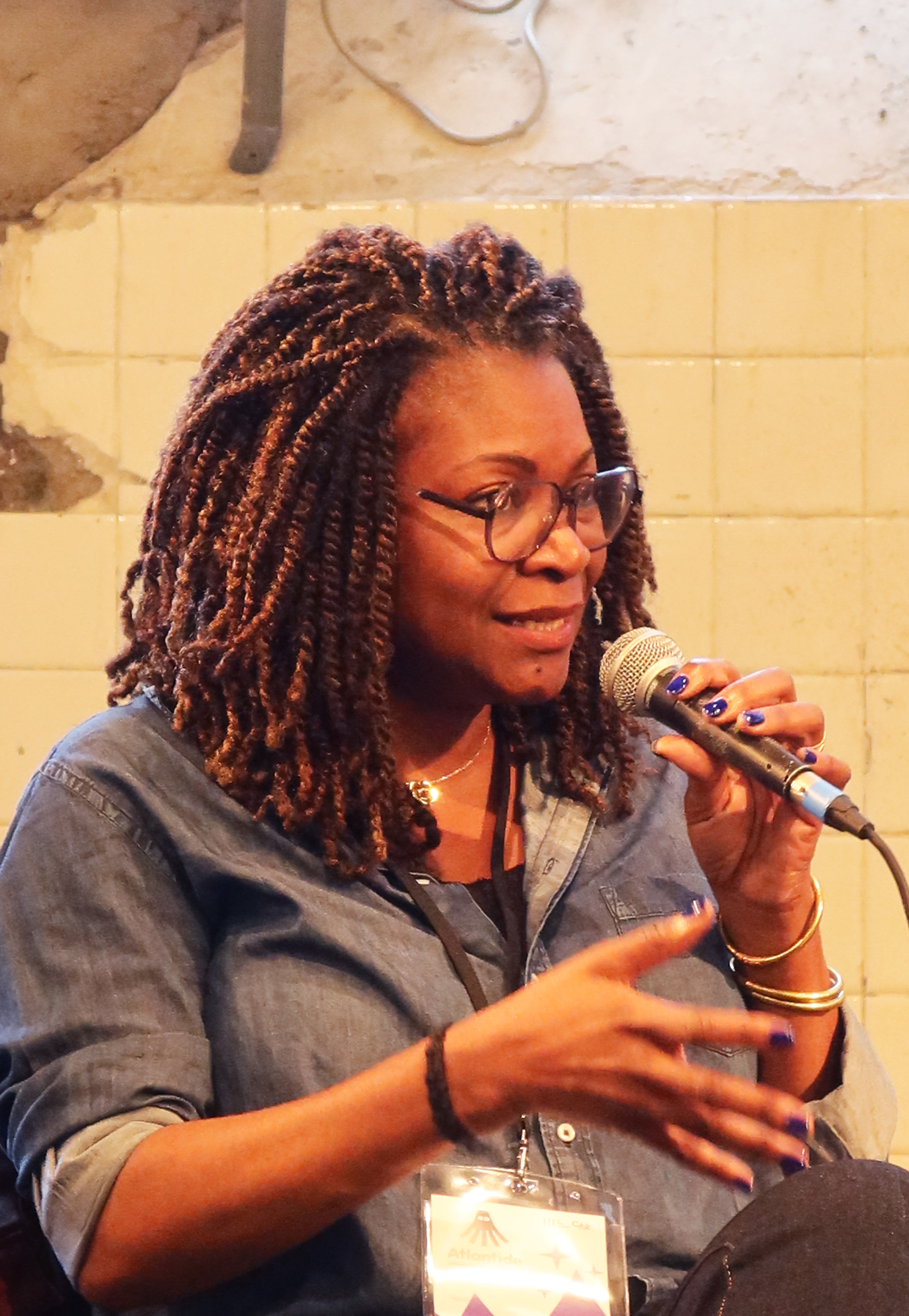
Hemley Boum-Festival Atlantide 2025, Nantes
