= Kangni Alem =

Togolese writer, translator and literary critic (born 1966)

- Born: Kangni Alemdjrodo; April 21, 1966 (age 60); Lome, Togo
- Writing career
- Language: French
- Notable awards: Grand prix littéraire d'Afrique noire Williams Sassine literary prize, 3rd prize Tchicaya U'Tamsi prize

Kangni Alem (born 21 April 1966 in Lomé) is a Togolese writer, translator, and literary critic . He is also a playwright and director, who in 1989 founded the Atelier Théâtre de Lomé ("Theatre Workshop of Lomé"). In 2003, he received the Great Literary Prize of Black Africa for his book, Cola Cola jazz. Also of note are his short story collections such as La gazelle s'agenouille pour pleurer.
