= La carte d'identité =

1982 novel by Jean-Marie Adiaffi

La Carte d'identité
- Author: Jean-Marie Adiaffi
- Language: French
- Publication date: 1982
- Publication place: Côte d'Ivoire

La Carte d'identité is a novel by Ivorian author Jean-Marie Adiaffi. It won the Grand prix littéraire d'Afrique noire in 1981.
