= Patrice Nganang =

Cameroonian writer, poet and teacher (born 1970)

Alain Patrice Nganang
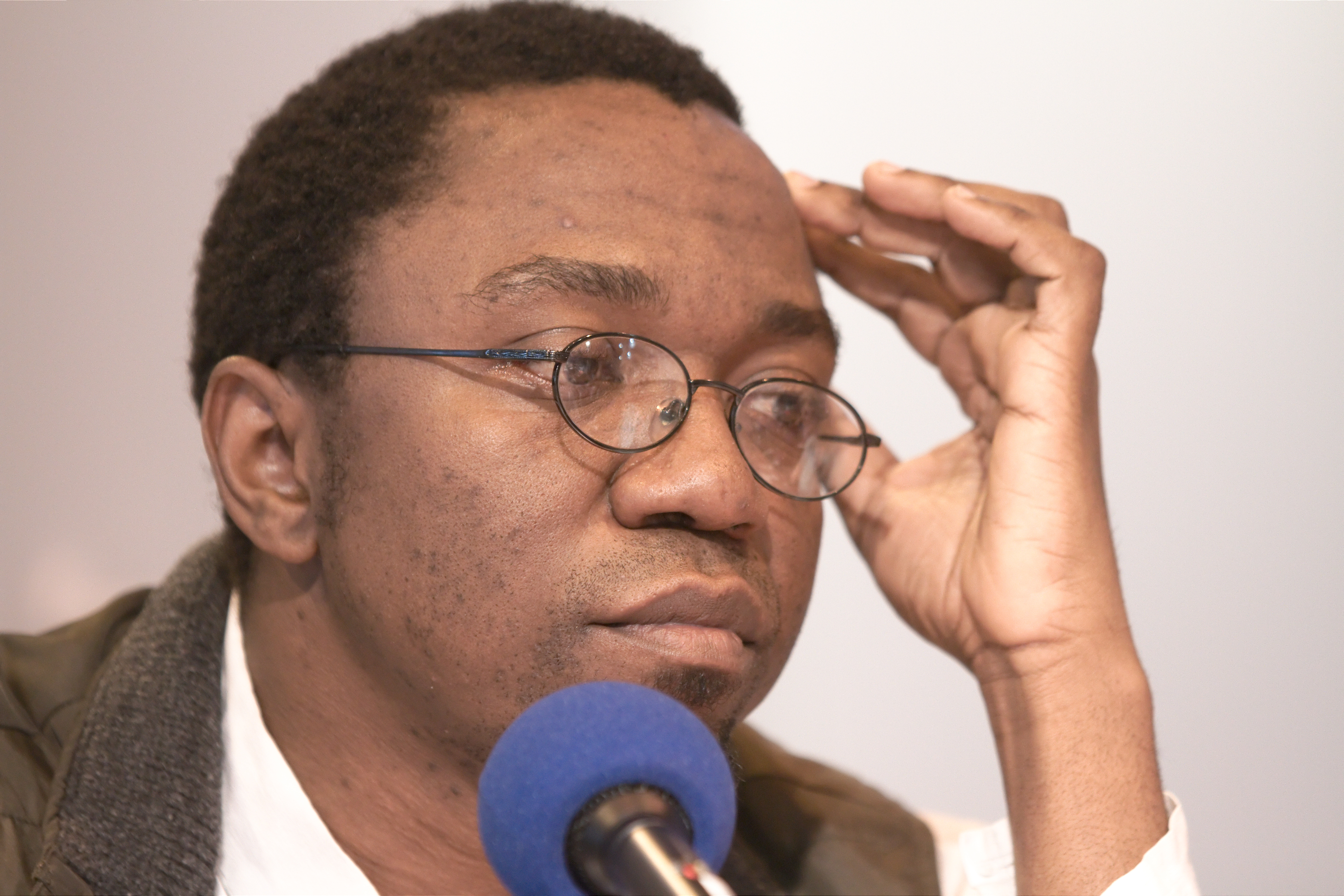
- Born: 1970 (age 55–56); Yaoundé, Cameroon
- Education: University of Yaounde; Johann Wolfgang Goethe University
- Occupations: Writer, poet and teacher
- Employer: Stony Brook University
- Writing career
- Notable work: Temps de chien (1999)
- Notable awards: Grand prix littéraire d'Afrique noire

Alain Patrice Nganang (born 1970) is an American writer, poet and teacher of Cameroonian origin, a member of the Bamileke people. He authored the poetry collections elobi (1995) and Apologie du Vandale (2006). As a literature scholar, his research examines violence and post-colonial African literature and culture. He earned a Master's degree from the University of Yaounde in 1992.

He was born in Yaoundé, Cameroon, and was educated in Cameroon and Germany. He was awarded a Ph.D. in comparative literature at Johann Wolfgang Goethe University. During 2006–2007, he was the Randolph Distinguished Visiting Associate Professor of German Studies at Vassar College. He was an instructor at the Shippensburg University until 2007, and is now a Professor of Comparative Literature at Stony Brook University. The African Literature Association shortlisted him for the Fonlon-Nichols Award for Extraordinary Achievements in Scholarships and literature in 2003. He is the head of Department of Africana studies at Stony Brook University, US.

His 1999 novel Temps de chien was awarded the Prix Littéraire Marguerite Yourcenar in 2001 and the Grand prix littéraire d'Afrique noire in 2002.

== Disappearance and arrest ==
On December 7, 2017, Nganang was reported missing at the Douala airport where he was to catch a flight on Kenya Airways to Harare, Zimbabwe, the day after publishing an article on the site Jeune Afrique, criticising Paul Biya's government for its handling of protests by English-speaking Cameroonians. Nganang was detained for three weeks as he was about to fly out of his country of birth

== Release and deportation ==
On December 27, 2017, a judge in Cameroon ordered his release. Nganang was deported back to the US, where he also holds dual citizenship.

== Bibliography ==
- La Promesse des fleurs, 1997 (ISBN 2-7384-4706-6)
- Temps de chien, 1999 (ISBN 2-84261-419-4); trans. in English as Dog Days, 2006 (ISBN 0-8139-2535-5)
- La Joie de vivre, 2003 (ISBN 2-84261-439-9)
- Dernières nouvelles du colonialisme, 2006 (ISBN 2-911412-40-0)
- L'Invention du beau regard, 2005 (ISBN 2-07-077271-3)
- Mont Plaisant, 2011 (ISBN 978-2-84876-177-0); trans. in English as Mount Pleasant, 2016 (ISBN 9780374213855)
- La Saison des prunes, 2013; trans. in English as When the Plums Are Ripe, 2019 (ISBN 9780374288990)
- Empreintes de Crabe, 2018; trans. in English as A Trail of Crab Tracks, 2022 (ISBN 9780374602987)
- Mboudjak: Les Aventures du Chien-Philosophe, JC Lattès (2021)

=== Essays ===
- Le principe dissident, 2005 (ISBN 9956-435-00-7)
- Manifeste d'une nouvelle littérature africaine, 2007 (ISBN 2-915129-27-4)
- L'Afrique répond à Sarkozy - Contre le discours de Dakar, ouvrage collectif, 2008 (ISBN 978-2-84876-110-7)
