= Jean-Pierre Makouta-Mboukou =

Congolese politician & academic (1929–2012)

Deputy and minister plenipotentiary
- In office 1963–1968

Senator
- In office 1992–1997

Personal details
- Born: 17 July 1929 Kindamba
- Died: 9 October 2012 (aged 83) Pontoise
- Occupation: Politician, writer

Jean-Pierre Makouta-Mboukou (17 July 1929 – 9 October 2012) was a Congolese politician, academic, novelist and playwright. For his abundant and eclectic work his biographers have called him the “Congolese Victor Hugo” and the “baobab of Congolese literature”.

== Life ==
Jean-Pierre Makouta-Mboukou was born on 17 July 1929 in Kindamba in the Pool department of the Republic of the Congo. He held several doctorates, and taught French and African linguistics and literature in several universities, including the Sorbonne Nouvelle University Paris 3 for 22 years, but also in Ouagadougou, Abidjan, Dakar and Brazzaville.

He was strongly involved in politics, and was a deputy and minister plenipotentiary (1963–1968). After the 1968 coup d'état, he was stripped of Congolese nationality and naturalized as French. He was rehabilitated and regained Congolese nationality in 1991 and joined the Congolese Movement for Democracy and Integral Development (MCDDI). He was a senator (1992–1997) and second vice-president of the Senate. He retired from political life after the civil war of 1997. He died on 9 October 2012 at Pontoise hospital in Val-d'Oise, France.

== Selected works ==
Jean-Pierre Makouta-Mboukou was the author of about 25 books in a wide range of genres and about fifty articles published in various foreign journals.

- La Lèpre du roi : tragédie en deux actes, 1968 (concours théâtral interafricain 1968)
- Un Ministre nègre à Paris : comédie en trois actes, 1968 (concours théâtral interafricain 1968)
- Les Initiés, CLE, 1970
- Introduction à la littérature noire, CLE, 1970 (textes de cours et conférences donnés à Brazzaville entre 1963 et 1966)
- En quête de la liberté, ou, Une vie d'espoir : roman, CLE, 1970
- L'âme bleue : poèmes, CLE, 1971
- Le français en Afrique noire : histoire et méthodes de l'enseignement du français en Afrique noire, Bordas, 1973
- Réinterprétation morpho-phonique des emprunts français en langue téké de Manianga, Université Paris 3, 1973 (thèse de 3e cycle)
- Cantate de l'ouvrier : poème, P.-J. Oswald, 1974
- Les exilés de la forêt vierge, ou, Le grand complot : roman, P.-J. Oswald, 1974
- Jacques Roumain : essai sur la signification spirituelle et religieuse de son œuvre, Université Paris 4, 1975 (thèse)
- Étude descriptive du fúmú, dialecte téké de Ngamaba, Brazzaville, Université Paris 3, 1977 (thèse d'État)
- Introduction à l'étude du roman négro-africain de langue française : problèmes culturels et littéraires, Nouvelles éditions africaines, Abidjan, 1980
- ... Et l'homme triompha !, Fondation du Prix mondial de la Paix, Paris, 1983
- Spiritualités et cultures dans la prose romanesque et la poésie négro-africaine (de l'oralité à l'écriture) , Nouvelles éditions africaines, Abidjan, 1983
- Les dents du destin, Nouvelles éditions africaines, Abidjan, Dakar, Lomé, 1984
- Les grands traits de la poésie négro-africaine : histoire poétiques significations, Nouvelles éditions africaines, Abidjan, Dakar, Lomé, 1985
- Lettre à la nation africaine pour que s'impose l'humanisme nègre, Fondation du Prix mondial de la Paix, Paris, 1986
- L'homme aux pataugas : roman, L'Harmattan, 1992
- Les littératures de l'exil : des textes sacrés aux œuvres profanes : étude comparative, L'Harmattan, 1993
- Enfers et paradis des littératures antiques aux littératures nègres : illustration comparée de deux mondes surnaturels, H. Champion, 1996
- La destruction de Brazzaville ou La démocratie guillotinée, L'Harmattan, 1996
- Systèmes, théories et méthodes comparés en critique littéraire, vol. I, Des poétiques antiques à la critique moderne; vol. II, Des nouvelles critiques à l'éclectisme négro-africain, L'Harmattan, 2003
- Le contestant ou un pasteur chez les Carmélites, L'Harmattan, 2006

== Distinctions ==
Jean-Pierre Makouta-Mboukou was a member of the French Académie des sciences d'outre-mer and the International Council of the French Language (Conseil international de la langue française).

In 1985 he received the Grand prix littéraire d'Afrique noire for his Introduction to the Study of the French-language Negro-African Novel and the Main Features of Negro-African Poetry. In 1994 he received the Aimé Césaire Literary Prize.

== Sources ==
- Clark, John F.; Decalo, Samuel (2012), "Makouta-Mboukou, Jean-Pierre", Historical Dictionary of Republic of the Congo (4 ed.), Scarecrow Press, p. 267, ISBN 9780810879898
- Etsio, Édouard (2001), Congo 2000 : état des lieux (in French), Paris: L'Harmattan, p. 212, ISBN 9782747507837
- Grand prix littéraire de l'Afrique noire. Liste des lauréats (PDF) (in French), archived from the original (PDF) on 3 March 2016
- Kodia, Noël (26 October 2012), "J.P. Makouta-Mboukou : Un baobab de la littérature congolaise est tombé", Star du Congo
- "Le professeur Jean-Pierre Makouta-Mboukou, a rejoint la forêt vierge", Congopage (in French)
- Mousahoudji-Boussamba, J. R.; Doctrové Mouanou, S. G. (2002), Jean-Pierre Makouta-Mboukou : romancier, Paris: L'Harmattan, p. 235, ISBN 2-7475-2747-6
- Nkounkou, Bernard (2012), "Hommage au professeur Jean-Pierre Makouta-Mboukou: 17 juillet 1929 – 9 octobre 2012", World Vision (in French)
- "Obsèques du Professeur Jean-Pierre Makouta-Mboukou", Mediapart (in French), 23 October 2012
