= Guy Menga =

Congolese writer, playwright, journalist, and politician

- Born: Gaston Guy Bikoutamenga; 1935 (age 90–91)
- Occupations: Novelist, playwright, journalist

Guy Menga (born Gaston Guy Bikoutamenga in 1935) is a novelist, playwright, and journalist from the Republic of the Congo. He directed the African section of Radio France Internationale in 1990 and later became a minister in the government of André Milongo from June 1991 to January 1992.

== Awards ==
In 1969 he received the Grand prix littéraire d'Afrique noire for his novel La Palabre stérile.
