= François-Joseph Amon d'Aby =

François-Joseph Amon d'Aby (17 July 1913 – 10 January 2007) was a French-language playwright and essayist in the Côte d'Ivoire.

== Life ==
Amon d'Aby started work in the government archives in 1937, rising to become their director.

He was a pioneer of Ivorian theatre. He wrote plays for several organizations: Le Théâtre Indigène de la Côte d'Ivoire, which he founded with Germain Coffi Gadeau in 1938; the Cercle Culturel et Folklorique de la Côte d'Ivoire, which he, Gadeau and Bernard Dadié founded in 1953; and the Jeunesse Ouvrière Chrétienne [Young Christian Workers' Association]. Though his earlier plays were based upon Ivorian oral literature, his later plays also borrowed from European traditions. Generally moralizing, his plays attacked some traditional social practices (e.g. matriarchy in Kwao Adjoba, or clan parasitism in Entraves) as outdated in a modern society.

Amon d'Aby also edited collections of folk tales, and published several cultural and sociological studies of the Côte d'Ivoire.

== Works ==
- La Côte d'Ivoire dans la cité africaine, 1951
- Le problème des chefferies traditionnelles en Côte d'Ivoire, 1958
- Croyances religieuses et coutumes juridiques des Agni de la côte d'Ivoire, 1960
- (ed.) Le théatre populaire en République de Côte d'Ivoire : oeuvres choisies, 1966
- La mare aux crocodiles: contes et légendes populaires de Côte d'Ivoire, 1973
- Proverbes populaires de Côte d'Ivoire, 1984
- Le murmure du roi: recueil de dix contes, 1984

Plays

- Kwao Adjoba. ou Procès du régime matriarchal en Basse Côte d'Ivoire [Kwao Adjoba, or the trial of the Matriarchal System of Lower Ivory Coast], 1953
- Entrave [Shackles], 1955
- La Couronne aux Enchères [The Auction Ring], 1956
