= Cola Cola jazz =

2003 novel by Kangni Alem

- Author: Kangni Alem
- Language: French
- Publication date: 2002
- Publication place: Togo

Cola Cola jazz is a 2002 novel by Togolese author Kangni Alem. It won the Grand prix littéraire d'Afrique noire in 2003.
