= Mbarek Ould Beyrouk =

Mbarek Ould Beyrouk (Arabic: مبارك ولد بيروك) is a Mauritanian writer and journalist. In 2016, he received both the Prix Ahmadou-Kourouma and the Prix du roman métis des lycéens for his novel Le Tambour des larmes (The Desert and the Drum).

== Biography ==
Mbarek Ould Beyrouk was born in Atar, Mauritania, in 1957. He studied law at Mohammed V University and founded the country's first independent newspaper, Mauritanie demain, in 1988.

== Works ==
- Et le ciel a oublié de pleuvoir (éditions Dapper, 2006)
- Nouvelles du désert (Présence africaine, 2009)
- Le Griot de l'émir (éditions Elyzad, 2013)
- Le Tambour des larmes (éditions Elyzad, 2015). The Desert and the Drum, trans. Rachael McGill (Dedalus Books, 2018)
- Je suis seul (éditions Elyzad, 2018)
- Parias (éditions Sabine Wespieser, 2021). Pariahs, trans. Marjolijn de Jager (Schaffner Press, 2023)
- Le Silence des horizons (éditions Elyzad, 2021). The Silence of the Horizons, trans. Marjolijn de Jager (Schaffner Press, 2025)
- Saara (éditions Elyzad, 2022). Saara, trans. Rachael McGill (Dedalus Books, 2025)
