= Nimrod (writer) =

Chadian writer (born 1959)

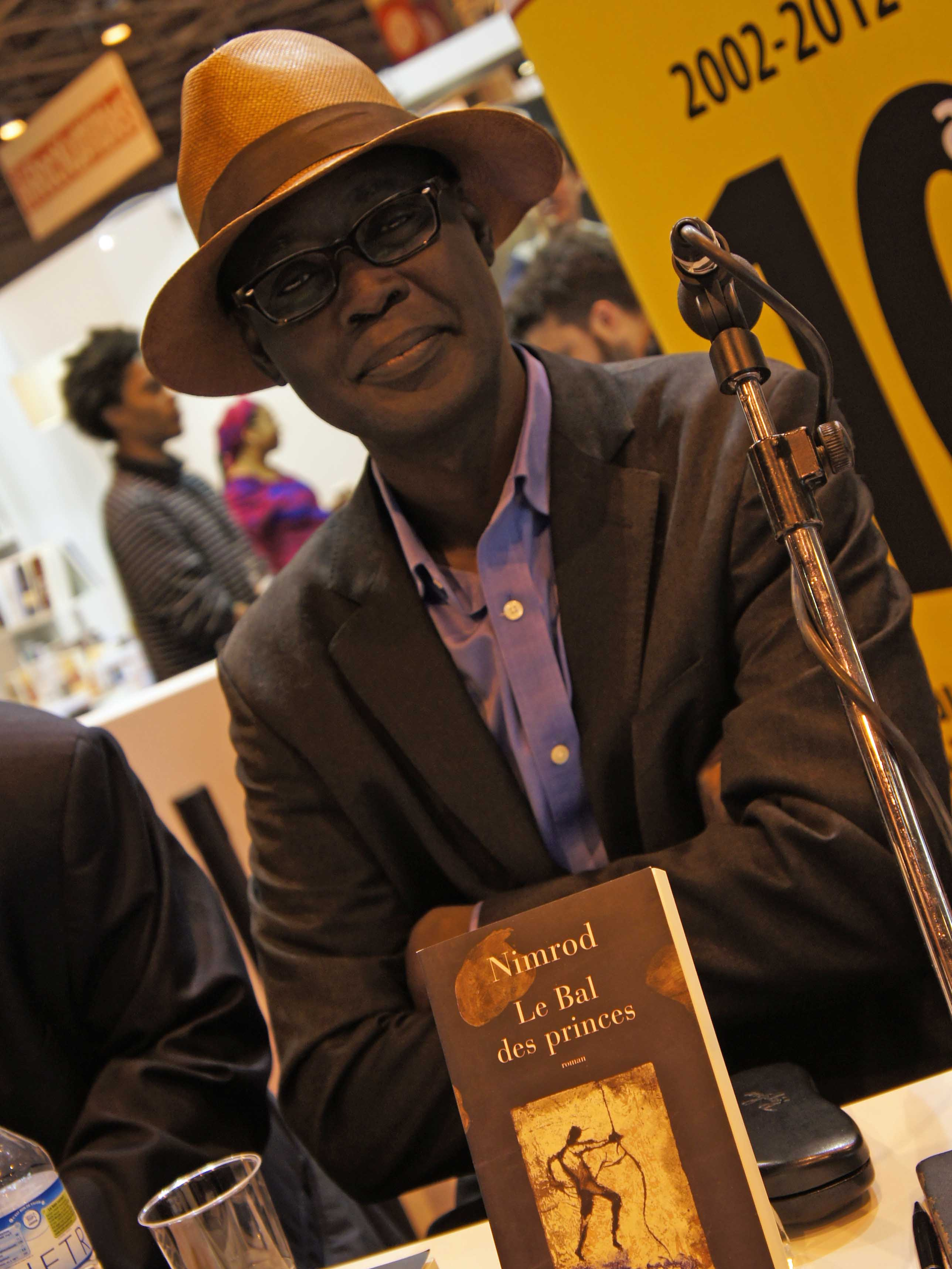
- Nimrod in 2012
- Born: Nimrod Bena Djangrang; 7 December 1959 (age 66); Koyom, Chad

Nimrod Bena Djangrang (born 7 December 1959), better known by the pen name Nimrod, is a Chadian poet, novelist and essayist who currently lives in France.

== Life and work ==
Nimrod was born in Koyom and completed primary and secondary school in Chad. In 1984 he moved to Abidjan in Ivory Coast, where he continued his studies and taught in middle and high schools. In 1991, he moved to France.

He currently lives in Amiens, France, and teaches philosophy at the University of Picardy Jules Verne. He was the editor-in-chief of the journal Aleph, beth (1997–2000) and also the founder of the literary magazine Agotem.

== Bibliography ==
=== Poetry ===
- Pierre, poussière (Obsidiane, 1989)
- Passage à l’infini (Obsidiane, 1999)
- En saison, suivi de Pierre, poussière (Obsidiane, 2004)
- Babel, Babylone (Obsidiane, 2010)
- Sur les berges du Chari, district nord de la beauté (Bruno Doucey, 2016)
- J'aurais un royaume en bois flottés : anthologie personnelle 1989–2016 (Gallimard, 2017)
- Nébuleux trésor (Archétype, 2018)
- Petit éloge de la lumière nature (Obsidiane, 2020)

=== Novels, novellas and short stories ===
- Les Jambes d’Alice (Actes Sud, 2001)
- Le Départ (Actes Sud, 2005)
- Le Bal des princes (Actes Sud, 2008)
- L’Or des rivières (Actes Sud, 2010). The Rivers' Gold, trans. Dawn M. Cornelio in Nimrod: Selected Writings (2018)
- Un balcon sur l’Algérois (Actes Sud, 2013)
- L’enfant n'est pas mort (Bruno Doucey, 2017)
- Gens de brume (Actes Sud, 2017)
- La Traversée de Montparnasse (Gallimard, 2020)
- Le temps liquide (Gallimard, 2021)

=== Essays ===
- Tombeau de Léopold Sédar Senghor (Le Temps qu’il fait, 2003). Léopold Sédar Senghor: In Memoriam, trans. Dawn M. Cornelio in Nimrod: Selected Writings (2018)
- Léopold Sédar Senghor (Éditions Seghers, 2006).
- La Nouvelle Chose française (Actes Sud, 2008). The New French Matter, partially trans. Dawn M. Cornelio in Nimrod: Selected Writings (2018)
- Alan Tasso d'un chant solitaire (Les Blés d'or, 2010)
- Visite à Aimé Césaire suivi de Aimé Césaire, le poème d'une vie (Obsidiane, 2013)
- Léon-Gontran Damas, le poète jazzy (À dos d'âne, 2014)
- L'Eau les choses les reflets : la peinture de Claire Bianchi (Claire Bianchi, 2018)

=== Children's books ===
- Rosa Parks, non à la discrimination raciale (Actes Sud Jeunesse, 2008)
- Aimé Césaire, non à l'humiliation (Actes Sud Jeunesse, 2012). Aimé Césaire: No to Humiliation, trans. Emma Ramadan (Seven Stories Press, forthcoming).

=== Compilations in English ===
- Nimrod: Selected Writings, ed. Frieda Ekotto (University of Michigan Press, 2018)

== Awards and honours ==
- 1989: Prix de la vocation en poésie
- 1999: Prix Louise-Labé
- 2008: Prix Ahmadou-Kourouma
- 2008: Prix Benjamin-Fondane
- 2008: Prix Édouard-Glissant
- 2011: Prix Max-Jacob
- 2016: Prix de poésie Pierrette-Micheloud
- 2020: Prix Guillaume-Apollinaire
