= Kocumbo, l'étudiant noir =

Novel by Aké Loba

- Author: Aké Loba
- Language: French
- Publication place: Côte d'Ivoire

Kocumbo, l'étudiant noir is a novel by Ivorian author Aké Loba. It won the Grand prix littéraire d'Afrique noire in 1961.
