= Jessup, Pennsylvania =

Borough in Pennsylvania, US

- Borough
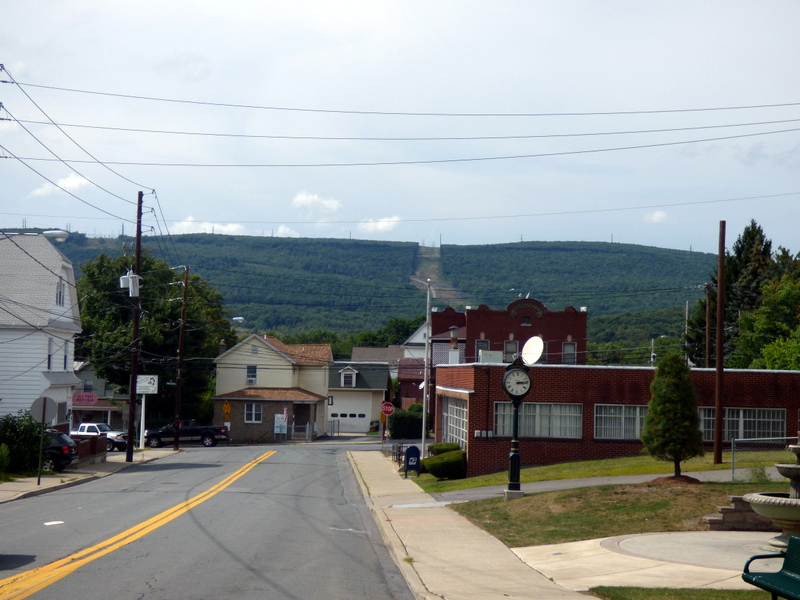
- Church Street in Jessup
- Etymology: Judge William Jessup
- Location of Jessup in Lackawanna County, Pennsylvania

- Location in Pennsylvania Location in the United States
- Coordinates: 41°28′16″N 75°33′44″W
- Country: United States
- State: Pennsylvania
- County: Lackawanna
- Settled: 1849
- Incorporated: December 1876

Area
  - Total: 6.78 sq mi (17.57 km^{2})
  - Land: 6.74 sq mi (17.45 km^{2})
  - Water: 0.050 sq mi (0.13 km^{2})
- Elevation: 853 ft (260 m)

Population (2020)
  - Total: 4,520
  - Density: 670.9/sq mi (259.04/km^{2})
- Time zone: UTC-5 (EST)
  - Summer (DST): UTC-4 (EDT)
- Zip Code: 18434
- Area code: 570
- FIPS code: 42-38160
- Website: www.jessupborough.com

Jessup is a borough in Lackawanna County, Pennsylvania, United States. The population was 4,532 at the 2020 census.

== Geography ==
Jessup is located at 41°28′16″N 75°33′44″W (41.471131, -75.562171).

According to the United States Census Bureau, the borough has a total area of 6.75 square miles (17.5 km^{2}), of which 6.7 square miles (17 km^{2}) is land and 0.05 square miles (0.13 km^{2}) (0.74%) is water.

== History ==
Settled in 1849, the town of Jessup was named after Judge William Jessup. It was presented to the Luzerne County Court for incorporation as the Borough of Winton in December 1876. Two years later, Lackawanna County was incorporated. The early 1890s were very significant for the little town, as numerous new mining operations were opened. Shortly after these were opened, immigrants from Europe were lured to the area by the work available in the booming anthracite coal fields.

== Demographics ==
Historical population
Census	Pop.	Note	%±
1880	905		—
1890	1,797		98.6%
1900	3,425		90.6%
1910	5,280		54.2%
1920	7,583		43.6%
1930	8,508		12.2%
1940	7,989		−6.1%
1950	6,280		−21.4%
1960	5,456		−13.1%
1970	4,948		−9.3%
1980	4,974		0.5%
1990	4,605		−7.4%
2000	4,718		2.5%
2010	4,676		−0.9%
2020	4,520		−3.3%
2021 (est.)	4,517	▼	−0.1%

=== 2020 census ===
As of the 2020 census, Jessup had a population of 4,520. The median age was 44.1 years. 18.2% of residents were under the age of 18 and 20.9% of residents were 65 years of age or older. For every 100 females there were 92.3 males, and for every 100 females age 18 and over there were 89.0 males age 18 and over.

99.8% of residents lived in urban areas, while 0.2% lived in rural areas.

There were 2,003 households, of which 25.2% had children under the age of 18 living in them. Of all households, 42.1% were married-couple households, 19.3% were households with a male householder and no spouse or partner present, and 31.3% were households with a female householder and no spouse or partner present. About 33.0% of all households were made up of individuals and 15.6% had someone living alone who was 65 years of age or older.

There were 2,149 housing units, of which 6.8% were vacant. The homeowner vacancy rate was 1.2% and the rental vacancy rate was 3.0%.

Racial composition as of the 2020 census
Race	Number	Percent
White	4,174	92.3%
Black or African American	55	1.2%
American Indian and Alaska Native	12	0.3%
Asian	34	0.8%
Native Hawaiian and Other Pacific Islander	0	0.0%
Some other race	53	1.2%
Two or more races	192	4.2%
Hispanic or Latino (of any race)	168	3.7%

=== 2010 census ===
At the 2010 census there were 4,676 people, 2,007 households, and 1,272 families residing in the borough. The population density was 697.9 inhabitants per square mile (269.5/km^{2}). There were 2,134 housing units at an average density of 318.5 units per square mile (123.0 units/km^{2}). The racial makeup of the borough was 96.9% White, 0.8% African American, 0.2% American Indian, 0.4% Asian, 0.05% Pacific Islander, 0.4% from other races, and 1.2% from two or more races. Hispanic or Latino of any race were 1.9%.

Of the 2,007 households, 24.7% had children under the age of 18 living with them, 45.9% were married couples living together, 12.7% had a female householder with no husband present, and 36.6% were non-families. 31.4% of households were made up of individuals, and 15.4% were one person aged 65 or older. The average household size was 2.33 and the average family size was 2.92.

In the borough the population was spread out, with 20.2% under the age of 18, 61.6% from 18 to 64, and 18.2% 65 or older. The median age was 42.5 years.

The median household income was $32,201 and the median family income was $43,013. Males had a median income of $36,339 versus $25,267 for females. The per capita income for the borough was $17,189. About 8.0% of families and 10.4% of the population were below the poverty line, including 11.3% of those under age 18 and 12.8% of those age 65 or over.

== Notable people ==
- Dominic Cossa, baritone Metropolitan Opera; NYC Opera; recording artist
- Nidra Poller, Paris-based author, translator and writer
- Louis Arthur Watres, fifth lieutenant governor of Pennsylvania
