= Yodi Karone =

Cameroonian writer

Yodi Karone (born Alan Dye, 15 March 1954) is a writer of Cameroonian origin. He is the author (in French) of four novels and a play; his novel Nègre de Paille won the Grand prix littéraire d'Afrique noire in 1982. In the 1980s he was one of the "leading young novelists" of a group of writers of African descent who lived in Paris.

== Career ==
Karone started as a playwright; his first play was Palabres de nuit ("Discussions of Night") in 1978. A second play was published in 1980, Sacré dernier. After that he wrote novels. Karone was a musician and a sculptor also, and this influenced his writing; he drew on "rhythm and visual images to enhance his narrative".

Le bal des caïmans, his first novel, is political, describing injustices suffered when an entire population is oppressed and repressed; a man is chased and captured, and put on trial. The testimony of the witnesses at this parody of a trial make up the novel. According to Ange-Séverin Malanda and Thomas Mpoyi-Buatu, who interviewed Karone in 1980, the limited perspective offered by these characters enhances the force of their experience even while it expressed errors and contradictions. Malanda and Mpoyi-Buatu said this stylistic feature was new in the African novel, and contributed to the idea of a search for subjectivity. Karone said he chose to have the caiman, an animal that does not actually live in Africa, in the title to express a distance from any particular country and achieve a kind of universality.

His 1988 novel A la Recherche du cannibale amour opens in the metro station Châtelet, in Paris, where the protagonist, a novelist from Africa, listens to a saxophone player, and promptly loses the manuscript for his novel. This starts a search that takes him to Cameroon and then to Harlem, and then back.

== Works ==
=== Drama ===
- Palabres de nuit (1978)
- Sacré dernier (1980)

=== Fiction ===
- Le bal des Caïmans (1980)
- Nègre de Paille (1982)
- A la Recherche du cannibale amour (1988)
- Les beaux gosses (1988)
