= Waiting for the Wild Beasts to Vote =

Novel by Ahmadou Kourouma

Waiting for the Wild Beasts to Vote (French: En attendant le vote des bêtes sauvages) is a satirical French-language novel by the Ivorian writer Ahmadou Kourouma, published in 1998. It was first translated as Waiting for the Vote of the Wild Animals by Carrol F. Coates (University of Virginia Press, 2001) and later by Frank Wynne as Waiting for the Wild Beasts to Vote (Heinemann, 2003). The novel won the Prix Tropiques (1998), the Grand prix Poncetton (1998) and the Prix du Livre Inter (1999).

The story is about the rise of the master hunter Koyaga and his rule as President of the République du Golfe during the Cold War. Koyaga manages to stay in power for more than thirty years, despite attempts to overthrow him.

The novel is structured in the form of a donsomana, a Malinké "hunter's praise song", told by a sora, that takes place in a series of six vigils. Each vigil has a theme: tradition, death, fate, power, betrayal and how all things have an end.

Koyaga and the other African leaders depicted in the novel are modelled after real African leaders of the second half of the 20th century. Additionally, Susan Gorman has drawn parallels between the novel and elements of the Sunjata epic.

== Main characters ==
Koyaga: Modeled after Gnassingbé Eyadema, president of Togo.

Tchao: Koyaga's father.

Nadjouma: Koyaga's mother.

Bokano: Marabout with the gift of divination.

Maclédio: Former national radio presenter of the République du Golfe.

Fricassa Santos: Former president of the République du Golfe, modelled after Togo's first president, Sylvanus Olympio.

Bingo: Sora and main narrator of the donsomana, he plays the kora and is a griot musician.

Tiécoura: Bingo's apprentice, called a responder or koroduwa.

Man whose totem is the caiman: Also called Tiékoroni, he rules the République des Ébènes (Ivory Coast) and is modelled after Félix Houphouët-Boigny.

Man whose totem is the hyena: Also called Bossouma, he rules the République des Deux Fleuves (Central African Republic) and is modelled after Jean Bédel Bokassa.

Man whose totem is the leopard: He rules the République du Grand Fleuve (Zaire) and is modelled after Mobutu Sese Seko.

Man in White, his totem the hare: Also called Nkoutigui Fondio, he rules the République des Monts (Guinea) and is modelled after Ahmed Sékou Touré.

Man whose totem is the desert jackal: He rules the lands of Djebels and Sand (Morocco) and is modelled after Hassan II.

Jean-Louis Crunet: Modelled after Nicolas Grunitzky.
