= Patrick Ilboudo =

Burkinabé writer (1951–1994)

Patrick Gomdaogo Ilboudo (February 18, 1951- February 28, 1994) was a writer from in Ouagadougou, Burkina Faso.

He was born in Bilbalgo neighborhood. He went to a school in Baoghin and Laurent Gilhat high school and after his BEPC, he had to start working.

He studied modern literature at the University of Ouagadougou with a master in IFP and a doctorate at the Panthéon-Assas University in 1983 with La politique française vue par les journaux africains

In 1980, he founded the mutual insurance company for the union and solidarity of writers (MUSE) with writers like Norbert Zongo.

Ilboudo was an assistant in institut africain d'études cinématographiques (INAFEC) of the University of Ouagadougou. In 1983 he created the associative anti-racist humanitarian movement MOVRAP.

== Works ==
- Les Toilettes, 1983
- Le Procès du Muet, 1986
- Le Vertige du trône, 1990
- Le Héraut têtu, 1992

== Awards ==
- Grand prix littéraire d'Afrique noire, 1992.
