= L'Aventure ambiguë =

1961 novel by Cheikh Hamidou Kane

- Author: Cheikh Hamidou Kane
- Language: French
- Publication date: 1961
- Publication place: Senegal

L'Aventure ambiguë (Ambiguous Adventure) is a novel by Senegalese author Cheikh Hamidou Kane, first published in 1961, about the interactions of western and African cultures. Its hero is a boy from the Diallobé region of Senegal who goes to study in France. There, he loses touch with his Islamic faith and his Senegalese roots. It won the Grand prix littéraire d'Afrique noire in 1962. A 1963 English translation of the novel by Katherine Woods was republished as part of the influential Heinemann African Writers Series in 1972 and again in 2012 by Melville House.

== Characters ==
=== Samba Diallo ===
Main character. Starts off as a young boy receiving an Islamic religious education in Senegal, then moves to Paris in order to continue his studies. In the process, he separates himself from his African roots and does not become fully French either. This book is about his quest for cultural/spiritual identity, and in the end he is torn between the two.

=== Thierno ===
Samba Diallo's spiritual teacher in Senegal. Teaches him to recite the Qur'an by the sacred fire in his hut.

=== La Grande Royale ===
The chief's sister and a relative of Samba Diallo, she pushes for him to attend the French school in order to learn "how to conquer without being right."

=== The Knight ===
Samba Diallo's father who asks Samba to come home after studying in Paris.
