= Jean-Marie Adiaffi =

Ivorian writer and filmmaker (1941–1999)

- Jean-Marie Adé Adiaffi
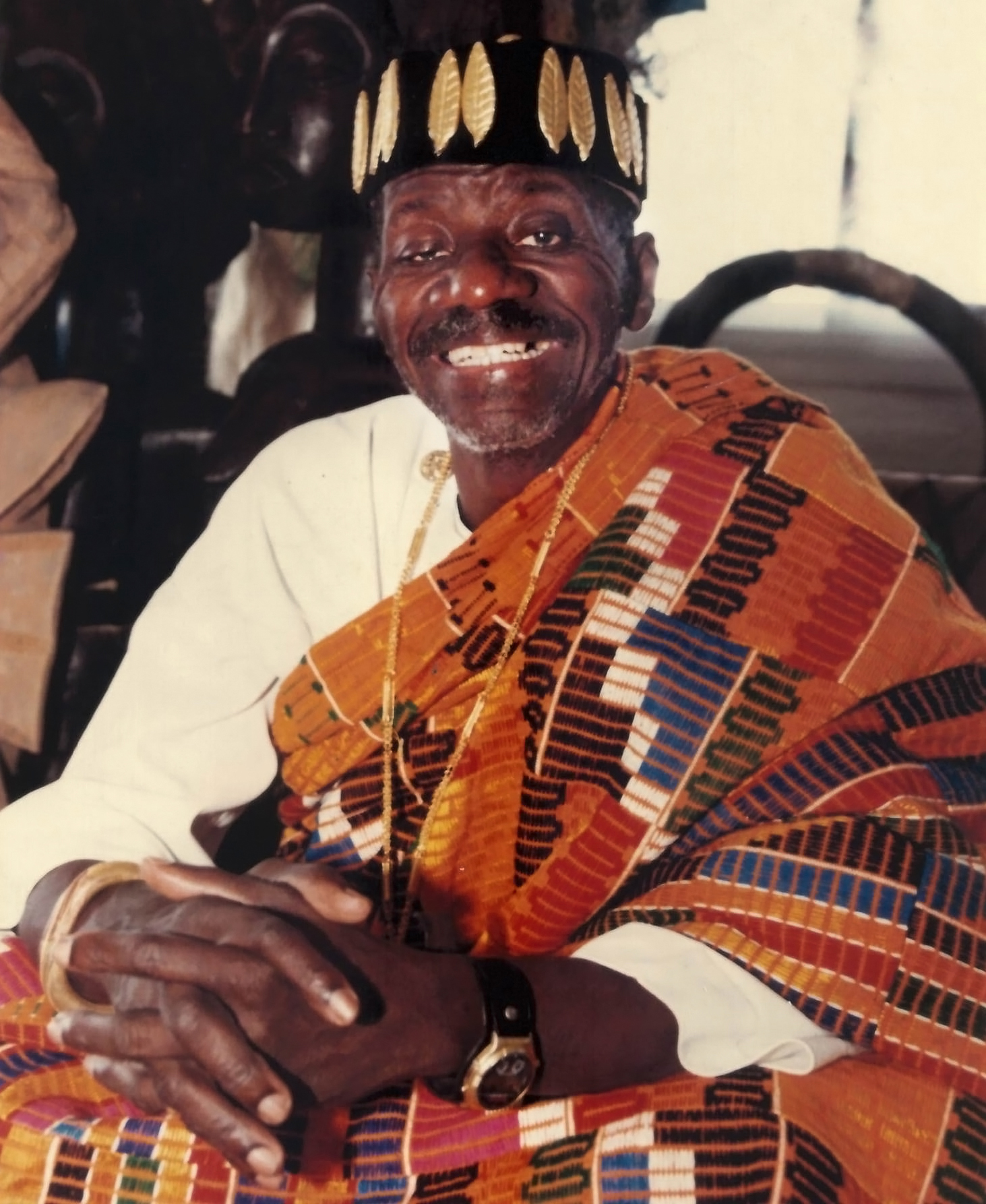
- Born: Jean-Marie Adé Adiaffi; 1 January 1941; Bettié, Ivory-Coast (Côte d'Ivoire)
- Died: 15 November 1999 (aged 58); Abidjan, Côte d'Ivoire
- Resting place: Bettié
- Education: Sorbonne University, France
- Occupations: writer, screenwriter, filmmaker and critic
- Awards: Grand prix littéraire d'Afrique noire

Jean-Marie Adé Adiaffi or Jean-Marie Adiaffi (1 January 1941 – 15 November 1999) was a writer, screenwriter, filmmaker and Ivorian critic. He studied film at Institut des hautes études cinématographiques (IDHEC) and philosophy at the Sorbonne, before teaching in his home country. He published his first collection of poems, "Yalé Sonan" in 1969. His novel "La carte d'identité" (The identity card, 1980), reflection on African postcolonial cultural alienation, receives the Grand prix littéraire d'Afrique noire. Next, came "D'éclairs et de foudre" (lightning and thunder, 1980) and "La Galerie infernale" (1984), "Silence, on développe" (1992). Committed in the modernization of African religions, he is the creator of "Bossonisme", a neologism designating a genius which is worshiped.

== Biography ==
Jean-Marie Ade Adiaffi was born on 1 January 1941 at Bettie in the region of Abengourou. Having lost his parents early on he was raised by Augustin Adépra, his maternal uncle. He completed his primary education at the village, his secondary school in Bingerville, then emigrated to France where he graduated. Adiaffi enrolled at `IDHEC (Advanced Institute of Film Studies) and then did an internship at the` OCORA (Office of Radio) from whence it comes out as a director of television and film.

Returned to Abidjan to work for RTI, the state broadcaster of Ivory Coast, he does not approve the conditions in the structure and returned to France in 1966 to prepare a Master of Philosophy at the Sorbonne. He obtained his CAPES and came back again in Ivory Coast in 1970 to teach philosophy in various schools and colleges including the Lycée classique d'Abidjan.

In addition, he is co-founder in 1986 of Association des écrivains de Côte d'Ivoire (the association of writers from Côte d'Ivoire).

Adiaffi made his literary debut in 1969 with the publication of Yale Sonan, and in 1980 published his second work d’éclairs et de foudres (lightning and thunder), a collection of poems. Then, he published other collections of poetry, but also several novels and an essay.

The work of Jean-Marie Adiaffi is a product of multiple influences. It depends in particular of Présocratic authors, especially Parmenides and Heraclitus, of the Symbolists such that `Eluard, Rimbaud and Lautréamont, and of the authors of Negritude, particularly, Césaire. It also takes Agni culture.

Under the general title of "Assonan Attin" (The path of release), this literature focuses on a trilogy that is constituted by novel, poetry and drama. But only two axes were reached: In one hand, the novel, with "La carte d'identité", "Silence on développe", "Les naufragés de l`intelligence", and in the other hand, poetry, with "La galerie infernale" (The diabolical gallery) and "d`éclairs et de foudres" (lightning and thunder). "Yalé Sonan" and "La légende de l`éléphanteau", a children's story, published in 1983, are not a part of this trilogy.

== Bossonism ==
Jean-Marie Adiaffi is also the inventor of the concept of Bossonism – from "bosson" genius Agni – billed as "the religion of Africans." For Adiaffi, colonization began with the spiritual (the `missionary activities), the release must be done by the spiritual way. "Bossonism", another name of "animism"- a term he`did not accept – appears as a theory of the revaluation of the "African spirituality". This concept is also, for Adiaffi, a "theology of African liberation."

== Works ==
=== Novels ===
- La carte d'identité – Hatier – 1980
- Silence, on développe – Nouvelles Du Sud – 1992
- Les naufragés de l'intelligence – CEDA – 2000

=== Poetry ===
- Yale Sonan – Promotion et Edition – 1969
- D'éclairs et de foudres – CEDA – 1980
- Galerie infernale – CEDA – 1984

=== Essay ===
- Lire Henri Konan Bédié, Le rêve de la graine – Neter – 1996

=== Children's book ===
- La légende de l'éléphanteau – Editions de l'Amitié – 1983

== Awards ==
- Grand prix littéraire d'Afrique noire – 1981
- Chevalier du mérite culturel (Ivory Coast) – 1991
