= Cheikh Hamidou Kane =

Senegalese writer (1928–2026)

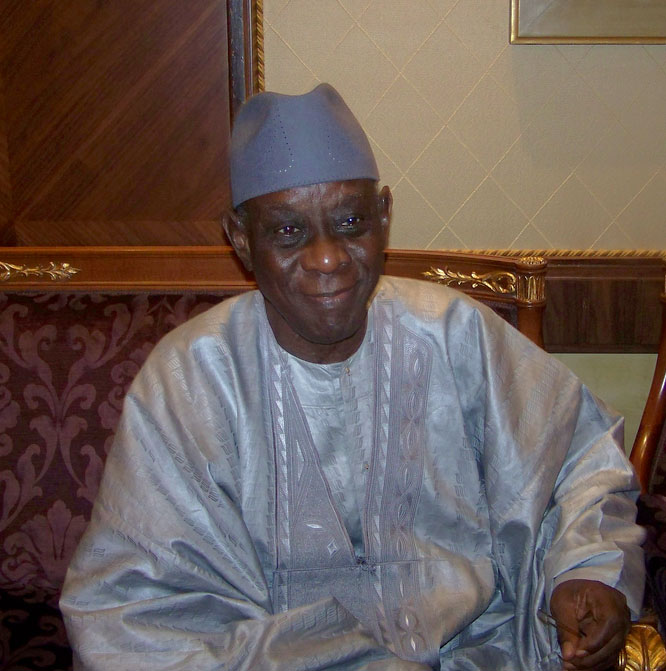
- Cheikh Hamidou Kane in 2008
- Born: 2 April 1928; Matam, French Senegal, French West Africa
- Died: October 2026 (aged 98); Dakar, Senegal
- Other names: Sheikh Hamidou Kane; Cheik Hamidou Kane
- Occupation: Writer
- Notable work: L'Aventure ambiguë (1961)
- Awards: Grand prix littéraire d'Afrique noire, 1962: Grand Prix des mécènes, 2019

Cheikh Hamidou Kane (2 April 1928 – 3 or 4 October 2026) was a Senegalese writer best known for his 1961 novel L'Aventure ambiguë (Ambiguous Adventure), about the interactions of western and African cultures. Its hero is a Fulani boy who goes to study in France, where he loses touch with his Islamic faith and his Senegalese roots. The novel was awarded the Grand prix littéraire d'Afrique noire in 1962.

== Life and career ==
Born in Matam, French Senegal, Kane had a traditional Muslim education, before going to Paris, France, to study law at the Sorbonne, subsequently receiving degrees in law and philosophy from the École Nationale de la France d'Outre-Mer. In 1959, he returned to Senegal and served in the government. He also worked in Lagos, Nigeria, and in Abidjan, Ivory Coast, as an official of UNICEF.

His autobiographical novel L'Aventure ambiguë was published in 1961, winning the Grand Prix Littéraire d'Afrique Noire the following year. His next novel, Les gardiens du temple, was published in 1995.

Kane was awarded the 2019 Grand Prix des Mécènes.

Kane died in Dakar in 2026, at the age of 98; the date was reported variously as 3 October or 4 October. His death was announced by President Bassirou Diomaye Faye on social media.
