= Les Soleils des indépendances =

1968 novel by Ahmadou Kourouma

- First edition
- Language: French
- Genre: Novel
- Publisher: Presses de l'Université de Montréal
- Publication date: 1968
- Publication place: Côte d'Ivoire
- ISBN: 2-02-001137-9

Les Soleils des indépendances (The Suns of Independence) is the first novel by Ivorian author Ahmadou Kourouma. It won the Grand prix littéraire d'Afrique noire in 1969.

The title is a play on words involving the meaning of the Maninka word "télé", which can mean "sun", but also "day", "era" or "period [of time]".

== Bibliography ==
- Les Soleils des indépendances, Presses de l'Université de Montréal, 1968
  - The Suns of Independence, Translator Adrian Adams, Holmes & Meier, 1981, ISBN 978-0-8419-0747-8
