= Natalia Grima =

Argentinean pianist and musical educator

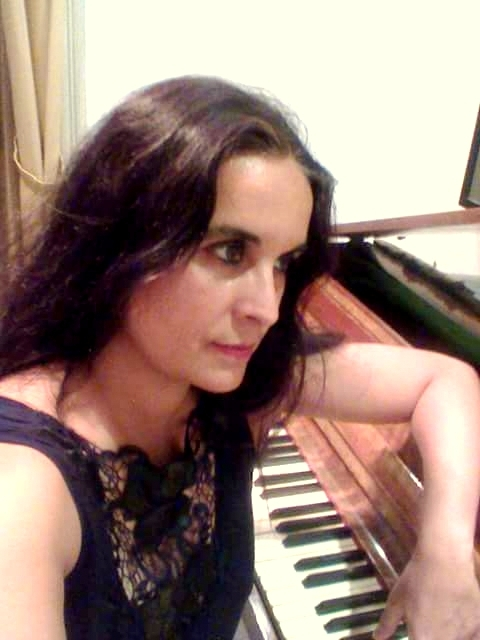

Background information
- Origin: Argentina
- Genres: Piano music
- Occupations: teacher, pianist,
- Instrument: Piano

Natalia Grima is an Argentinean pianist and musical educator.

== Early life ==
Grima was born in San Miguel de Tucumán, in 1970s, and is living in Buenos Aires since 2004.

== Work ==
She is the founder and chair of Suzuki Piano School in Buenos Aires , the first piano school in the city specialized in the Suzuki method.

Natalia holds a Bachelor of Arts degree with a major in music from Universidad Nacional de Tucumán, from which she graduated summa cum laude. Before, at Vicente Scaramuzza’s Piano School, she was educated by Oscar Buriek, Carmen Scalcione and Ana Laura Stampalia. She is a solo player, but also plays in orchestras and other musical ensembles, in Argentina, Peru, United States and Switzerland.

On 2004, for her contributions to culture though musical education, she was awarded the “Mujer Destacada de Nuestro Medio” by the City of San Miguel de Tucumán. On 2007, the Argentinean Federation of university women offered her with the FAMU Medal, the highest distinction of the Suzuki institution, among 82 nominees with outstanding grade averages at university. On 2011, Natalia represented Argentina at the “V Encuentro Suzuki de América Latina”, in Lima, Peru with the exposition “De la estimulación musical temprana a la ejecución instrumental”.

Two years later, the pianist was selected by the Ministry of Foreign Affairs to represent Argentina in a musical training at Holy Names University, in California, USA. And on 2015, again she was chosen to by the same office to represent her country at the International Congress that commemorated a 100 years of the Jaques Dalcroze Institut in Geneva, Switzerland.

Since 1997, she is specialized in the Musical/Pianistic Education at the Education for Talent or Mother Tongue Method (Suzuki Method). She thus received numerous scholarships by the Suzuki Association of the Americas, USA to pursue her training in Argentina, Chile, Perú, Estados Unidos, and even in Europe, at Cambridge University in the United Kingdom and Spain, where she met Caroline Fraser, Doris Koppelman and Mary Craig Powell among other famous pianists. She also followed other methods, such as: Dalcroze Method; Kodaly Method; RYE Method (Recherche Sur Yoga dans L’Education- Research on Yoga in Education) and Alexander Method.
