= Nidra Poller =

American writer and translator

- Born: 1935 (age 90–91); Jessup, Pennsylvania, U.S.
- Education: University of Wisconsin–Madison (BA); Johns Hopkins University (MA)
- Occupations: Author; translator; writer; journalist
- Years active: 1966–present

Nidra Poller (born 1935) is an American author, novelist, translator and writer who has lived in Paris since 1972. In later years, she has also been a reporter and the Paris editor for Pajamas Media.

== Biography ==
Poller is Jewish, and was born to an observant family in Jessup, Pennsylvania. She received a Bachelor of Arts in history from the University of Wisconsin–Madison, and a Master of Arts in writing seminars from the Johns Hopkins University. She began her literary career in 1966 with the publication of the short story "Wedding Party in Piazza Navona" in the review Perspectives, and was a professor at Federal City College, Washington, D.C., from 1969 to 1972. Originally a writer of fiction and translator from French to English, she switched to journalism in 2000, due to perceived French anti-Israel reactions to the Second Intifada, and later anti-Americanism following the September 11 attacks.

Poller has contributed to publications such as The Wall Street Journal, National Review, FrontPage Magazine, The New York Sun, Commentary, New English Review, Middle East Quarterly, American Thinker, The Jerusalem Post, The Times of Israel and many others. As a Zionist, her writings include observations on society and politics, including a perceived strong anti-Israeli bias in France, the Muhammad al-Durrah incident—a "myth" and "a crudely fabricated video" as she described it in her 2014 book about the incident, and anti-Jewish violence in France such as the murder of Ilan Halimi. In addition to being a writer, Poller is also a novelist, author of illustrated books for youths, and a translator, notably of the philosopher, Emmanuel Levinas, her translations having been said to manage "to preserve the richness of Levinas's evocative and difficult French", and which "are rendered into a very readable English".

She participated in the international counter-jihad conferences in Brussels in 2007 and in 2012, and has been on the advisory board of the International Free Press Society.

She has remained an American citizen ever since moving to France in 1972, and does not hold French citizenship.

== Bibliography ==
=== Authored books ===
- African Journals. Cherry Valley Editions. 1970.
- Eggs as usual breakfast etc. Éditions Cimarron. 1979. ISBN 9782864360018.
- Horse de Verve. Ouskokata. 1980. ISBN 9782864360032.
- As-tu connu Machu Picchu? (in French). Messidor. 1984. ISBN 9782209056460.
- Je t'en prie Grégory (in French). Le Seuil. 1993. ISBN 9782020189262.
- Karimi Hotel & other African equations. CreateSpace. 2013. ISBN 9781479362240.
- Al Dura: Long Range Ballistic Myth. Authorship. 2014. ISBN 9780988711945.
- The Black Flag of Jihad Stalks La Republique. Authorship. 2015. ISBN 9780988711969.
- Troubled Dawn of the 21st Century. Authorship. 2017. ISBN 9780988711983.
- So Courage & Gypsy Motion. Authorship. 2019. ISBN 9780999466742.
- madonna madonna. Authorship. 2019. ISBN 9780999466711.

=== Translated books ===
- Potok, Chaim (1985) [1981]. Livre des Lumières [The Book of Lights] (in French). Translated with Métral, Yvette. Buchet-Chastel. ISBN 9782702015254.
- Potok, Chaim (1987) [1985]. La Harpe de Davita [Davita's Harp] (in French). Translated with Paddeu, Philippe. Buchet Chastel. ISBN 9782702015247.
- Kourouma, Ahmadou (1993) [1990]. Monnew: a novel [Monnè, outrages et defis]. Mercury House. ISBN 9781562790271.
- Jeanneret, Michel (2001) [1997]. Perpetual Motion: Transforming Shapes in the Renaissance from da Vinci to Montaigne [Perpetuum mobile: métamorphoses des corps et des œuvres de Vinci à Montaigne]. Johns Hopkins University Press. ISBN 9780801864803.
- Levinas, Emmanuel (2003) [1994]. Unforeseen History [Les imprévus de l'histoire]. University of Illinois Press. ISBN 9780252028830.
- Levinas, Emmanuel (2005) [1972]. Humanism of the Other [Humanisme de l'autre homme]. University of Illinois Press. ISBN 9780252073267.
