= Jean Ikellé-Matiba =

Cameroonian writer

- Born: April 26, 1936; Sanaga-Maritime
- Died: 1984; Germany

Jean Ikellé-Matiba (April 26, 1936–1984) was a Cameroonian writer born in the Sanaga-Maritime division, Littoral Province, Cameroon. He studied in Paris and worked in France and Germany.

== Notable works ==
- Cette Afrique là !(1963): written in French it is a political novel which examines Cameroons colonial periods through the biography of an African who lived and worked under German and French colonial administration
- Adler und Lilie in Kamerun : Lebensbericht eines Afrikaners (1966) : is the German translation of Cette Afrique là!
