= Lamine Diakhate =

Senegalese author, poet and literary critic

- Born: September 16, 1928; Saint-Louis, Senegal
- Died: 1987 (aged 58–59)
- Occupations: Writer, poet, literary critic, politician, diplomat

{{Template:Expand French}}

Lamine Diakhate (September 16, 1928 in Saint-Louis – 1987) was a Senegalese author, poet and literary critic of the négritude school, who served his country as a politician and diplomat.

== Early life and education ==
Diakhate was born in Saint-Louis, Senegal. He attended schools in Louga and Saint-Louis before becoming a student at the universities of Katibougou (Sudan), Dakar (Senegal), and Paris. He gained diplomas in Oriental Languages, Phonetics, and General Linguistics.

== Career ==
=== Journalism ===
After his university studies, Diakhate was trained as a journalist and editor, and occupied important positions in Paris and Dakar. He became chief of the Information Department of SORAFOM (the Société de Radiodiffusion de la France d’Outre-Mer) in Paris, and director of Radiodiffusion du Sénégal (SORAFOM and the government of Senegal) as well as director of the Information Department of Radio de la Fédération du Mali. Lamine Diakhate published a large number of newspaper articles in journals like Afrique en Marche (Paris), Condition Humaine (Dakar), Dakar Matin or Le Soleil (Dakar).

=== Diplomacy ===
As a close collaborator of Léopold Sédar Senghor, he was made chief of Senghor's presidential cabinet (Chef du Cabinet de la Présidence du Sénégal) and Minister of Information, Telecommunication, and Tourism. Later he also served as Ambassador of Senegal to Nigeria, the Kingdom of Morocco, and as Permanent Counsellor or Permanent Vice Delegate of Senegal (Conseiller ou Délégué Permanent Adjoint du Sénégal) to the UNESCO in Paris.

=== Literature, editing and criticism ===
As a black African author and poet writing in French, Diakhate was one of the leading figures of the Négritude school. In his understanding this literary movement constituted an effort to give voice to the traditions and cultural values of black Africa, and to actively participate in the development of a universal humanism in cooperation with other civilizations. As a literary critic, Diakhate promoted ideas that were originally been formulated, or expressed, by Aimé Césaire, Léon-Gontran Damas, and Léopold Sédar Senghor. He introduced writers of the Négritude school to his readers and analyzed the works of others who did not belong to this school. Together with Aimé Césaire and Alioune Diop he was one of the five members of the editorial committee of Éditions Présence Africaine in Paris. This publishing house later printed several of his poetical works, and its journal, Présence Africaine, included several of his scholarly articles. For several years he also served as secretary for cultural affairs (secrétaire culturel) of the Société Africaine de Culture (SAC).

Diakhate participated in a large number of literary festivals and conferences in Africa, Europe, and Asia. He attended several Biennales Internationales de Poésie, for example the V. and und XII. Biennale of Knokke-Le-Zout in Belgium (September 1961; 1975), the Première and Troisième Biennale de la Langue Française in Namur and Liège (Belgium) in the years 1965 and 1969, the Colloques des Écrivains Afro-Scandinaves in Stockholm, Sweden, the Congrès des Ècrivains Afro-Asiatiques in Beirut, Lebanon in March 1967, the Festival Poétique de Struga (ex-Jugoslavia) in August 1976, the Fourth World Congress of Poets in Seoul, Corea, from July 2 until 7th, 979, as well as the 15e Congrès de l’Union Internationale des Journalistes et de la Presse de Langue Française in Paris from September 29. September until bis October 6, 1979. On several occasions Mr. Diakhate became one of the organizers, for example of the Premier Festival Mondial des Arts Nègres from April 1 until April 24, 1966 in Dakar, the Festival Culturel Panafricain d’Alger of the year 1969, the Journées Culturelles Africaines de Turin, Italy, in April 1967. the Colloque sur la Négritude in Dakar, Senegal, in April 1971, as well as the Introduction à la Poésie de L. S. Senghor in Casablanca, Morokko, in April 1974.

== Awards ==
The literary merits of Lamine Diakhate were formally recognized on several occasions. He was elected a member of the Société des Gens de Lettres de France in November 1976. And he was awarded two literary prizes: The Prix Edgar Poe for the year 1971, granted to him by the Maison de la Poésie in Paris, and the Grand Prix Littéraire de l’Afrique Noire 1979 for his novel Chalys d'Harlem.

== Works ==
=== Poetry ===
- La joie d’un Continent. Editions P.A.B, (Alès 1954)
- « Pour la Jeune Fille de Soie Noire », Présence Africaine 2e série no. 3 ( avril – septembre, 1955), 48.
- Primordiale du Sixième Jour. Éditions Présence Africaine (Paris 1963)
- Temps de Mémoire. Editions Présence Africaine (Paris 1967)
- Nigérianes. Nouvelles Éditions Africaines (Dakar/Abidjan 1974)
- Terres Médianes. Editions Saint-Germain-des-Pres (Paris 1984)

=== Novels and other forms ===
- « Sarzan ». Liaisons, numéro spécial, l’Afrique nouvelle (Dakar, le 1er mars 1955) [theatrical adaption of a novel by Birago Diop]
- « Prisonnier du Regard », Présence Africaine, nouvelle série bilingue No. 65 (1er trimestre 1968), 144- 155 [novel].
- Prisonnier du Regard. Les Nouvelles Éditions Africaines (Dakar 1975) [novel]
- Lecture libre de « Lettres d’Hivernage » et d’ «Hosties Noires » de Léopold Sédar Senghor. Nouvelles Éditions Africaines (Dakar 1976) [essay]
- Chalys d’Harlem. Les Nouvelles Éditions Africaines (Dakar 1978) [novel]
- Le Sahélien de Lagos. Les Nouvelles Éditions Africaines (Dakar 1984) [novel]
