= Venance Konan =

Ivorian journalist and writer

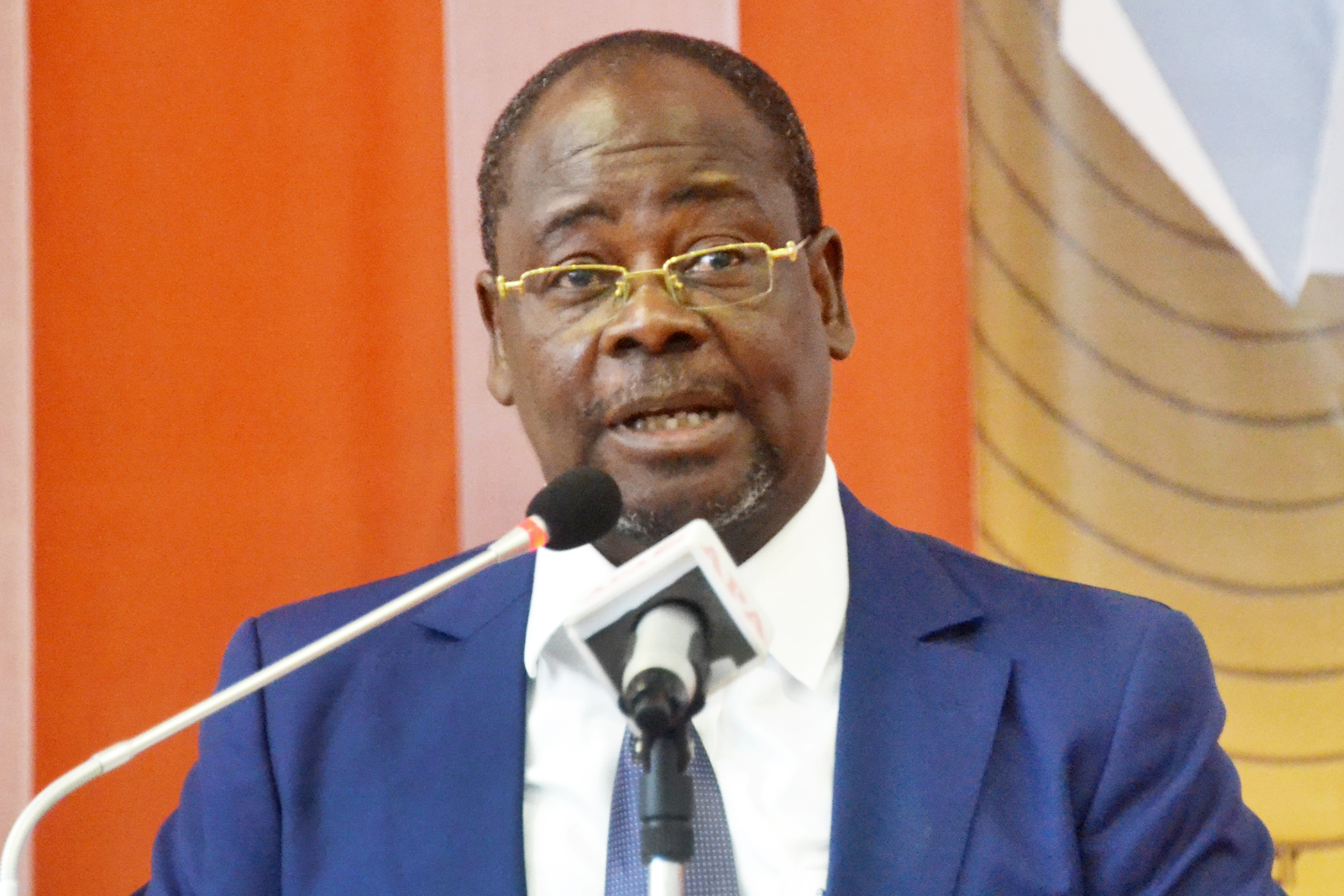
Venance Konan

Venance Konan (born 12 December 1958, in Bocanda), is an Ivorian journalist and writer. His journalistic talents have earned him several awards by the prestigious Ebony. He was propelled to the front of the literary scene in 2003 with his bestseller Prisonniers de la haine.

== Biography ==
His work is characterized by an afro-sarcastic approach. He was a supporter of Alassane Ouattara and the Democratic Party of Côte d'Ivoire – African Democratic Rally (PDCI-RDA) during the campaign for the late Ivorian presidential election, 2010. He has been appointed CEO of Fraternité Matin group after the accession of Alassane Ouattara as President of Côte d'Ivoire.

On September 14, 2021, Venance Konan was elected chairman of the board of directors of the Ivorian Broadcasting Corporation.

== Books and publications ==
- December 2003: Les Prisonniers de la haine, novel, Les nouvelles éditions ivoiriennes.
- April 2005: Robert et les catapila, collection of 6 short stories, Les nouvelles éditions ivoiriennes.
- June 2007: Nègreries, , Frat-Mat éditions.
- March 2009: Les catapila, ces ingrats, novel, Éditions Jean Picollec.
- March 2009: La Tunisie émergente, un exemple pour l'Afrique ?, collective book Éditions Médiane.
- October 2009: Dans la tête de Sarkozy, collective book, Éditions Seuil.
- December 2009: Ngo n'di ou palabres : pamphlet à deux mains, collection of chronicles, Éditions Le Nouveau Réveil.
- February 2011: Chroniques afro-sarcastiques : 50 ans d'indépendance, tu parles !, Éditions Favre.
- March 2012: Le Rebelle et le Camarade Président, novel, Éditions Jean Picollec.
- June 2012: Edem Kodjo, un homme, un destin, biography, co-published by the NEI-CEDA and Frat-mat editions.

== Comics ==
- La Colonne – Volume 1 & 2 – A story by Christopher Dabitch. Drawing and color Dumontheuil Nicolas – Preface written by Venance Konan – Futuropolis Edition – 2013 – ISBN 9782754807128

== Awards ==
- 1993: Best Ivorian investigation and reporting journalist
- 2003: Best Ivorian journalist for Reconciliation
- 2012: Grand prix littéraire d'Afrique noire for Edem Kodjo, un homme, un destin
