= Sami Tchak =

Togolese writer

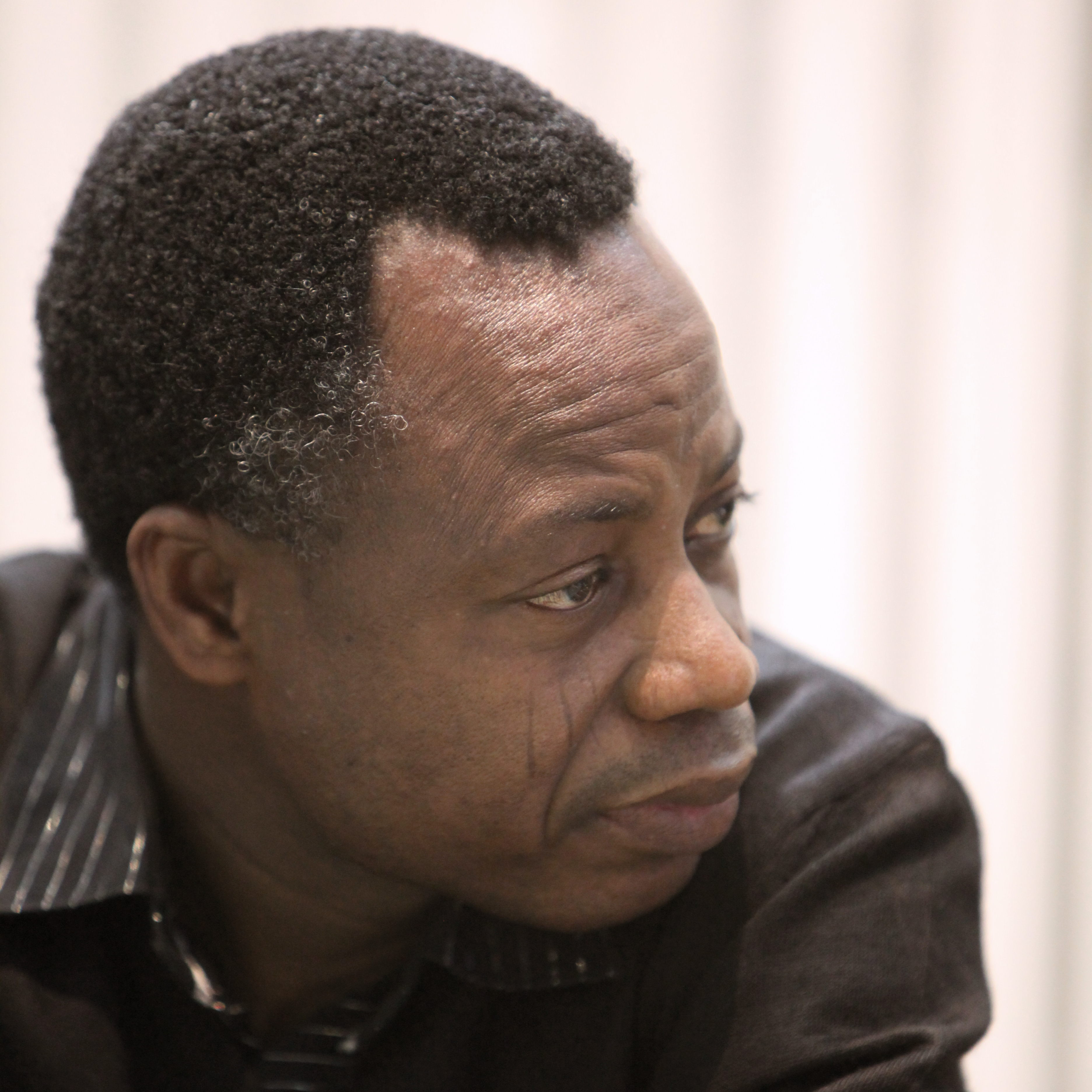

Sadamba Tcha-Koura (born 1960 in Bowounda), pen-name Sami Tchak, is a Togolese writer.

== Biography ==
After a dissertation in philosophy at the University of Lomé in 1983, Sami Tchak taught in a high school for three years. He arrived in France in 1986 to start his sociology studies, and obtained his PhD at the Sorbonne University in 1993. His research on prostitution in Cuba carried him to the island for seven months in 1996, resulting in the publication of the essay "Prostitution à Cuba. Communisme, ruses and débrouilles" (foreword by the Cuban writer Eduardo Manet). The discovery of Mexican and Colombian culture significantly influenced his literary choices. These places and the great writers who come from them offered him new horizons of writing.

Since the novel Hermina, published by Gallimard in 2003, all his works take place in an imaginary Latin American setting, which actually is far more similar to Africa. Besides the short stories and articles that has appeared in several magazines and revues, he has published six novels and four essays.

In 2004, Sami Tchak won the Grand Prix of Black African Literature for the entire range of his work.

His novels have been translated into Spanish, German and Italian.

== Works ==
=== Novels ===
- Femme infidèle, Lomé, Nouvelles Editions Africaines, 1988.
- Place des Fêtes, Paris, Gallimard, 2001.
- Hermina, Paris, Gallimard, 2003.
- La fête des masques, Paris, Gallimard, 2004.
- Le paradis des chiots, Paris, Mercure de France, 2006.
- Filles de Mexico, Paris, Mercure de France, 2008.
- Le Continent du Tout et du presque Rien, 2021.

=== Essays ===
- Africana. Raccontare il continente al di là degli stereotipi, Chiara Piaggio, Feltrinelli 2021.
- "La sexualité féminine en Afrique", Paris, L’Harmattan, 1999.
- "La prostitution à Cuba", Paris, L’Harmattan, 1999.
- "L’Afrique à l’épreuve du sida", Paris, L’Harmattan, 2000.
- "Formation d’une élite paysanne au Burkina Faso", Paris, L’Harmattan, 1995.
