= La Nouvelle Tribune (Benin) =

La Nouvelle tribune is a daily newspaper in Benin. Founded in 2001, the newspaper publishes national and international news in the French language. The newspaper is registered with the High Authority of Audio-Visual and Communication of Benin.

== History ==
The first issue of La Nouvelle tribune was published at the newspaper's headquarters in Cotonou in 2001. An online version of the newspaper was introduced in March 2008. By the end of 2014, the online edition was autonomous of the newspaper, due to increased internet access and advertising revenue.

In May 2018, the High Authority of Audio-Visual and Communication of Benin, the state agency charged with regulating media, suspended the publication of the newspaper following the publication, in its editorial columns, a series of remarks deemed insulting of President Patrice Talon. Numerous organizations representing professional associations, human rights defenders and the Ambassador of European Union all sought clarification as to why the newspaper had been shuttered, as the newspaper was seen as speaking truth to power. Taking the case to court, the newspaper won the case the following year. By mid-May 2019, the High Authority was forced to reverse its decision following a ruling by the Court of Appeal in Cotonou.

== Organization ==
As of 2017, the website of La Nouvelle tribune was composed of ten employees, including four journalists.

== See also ==
=== Related articles ===
- Media of Benin
- DigitalJournalism
