= Aké Loba =

Ivorian writer (1927–2012)

Gérard Aké Loba (15 August 1927 in Abobo, in the Abobo Baoule neighborhood, Ivory Coast – 3 August 2012 in Aix-en-Provence, France) was an Ivorian diplomat and writer. He won the Grand prix littéraire d'Afrique noire in 1961.

He was also a member of the parliament and mayor of the town of Abobo in Abidjan from 1985 to 1990.

== Bibliography ==
- 1960 : Kocoumbo, l’étudiant noir, Paris, Flammarion
- 1966 : Les fils de Kouretcha, Brussels, Editions de la Francité
- 1973 : Les Dépossédés, Brussels, Editions de la Francité
- 1992 : Le Sas des parvenus, Paris, Flammarion
