= Maurice Bandaman =

Ivorian writer, novelist, playwright and politician

Maurice Bandaman (born April 19, 1962) is an Ivorian writer, novelist, playwright and politician.

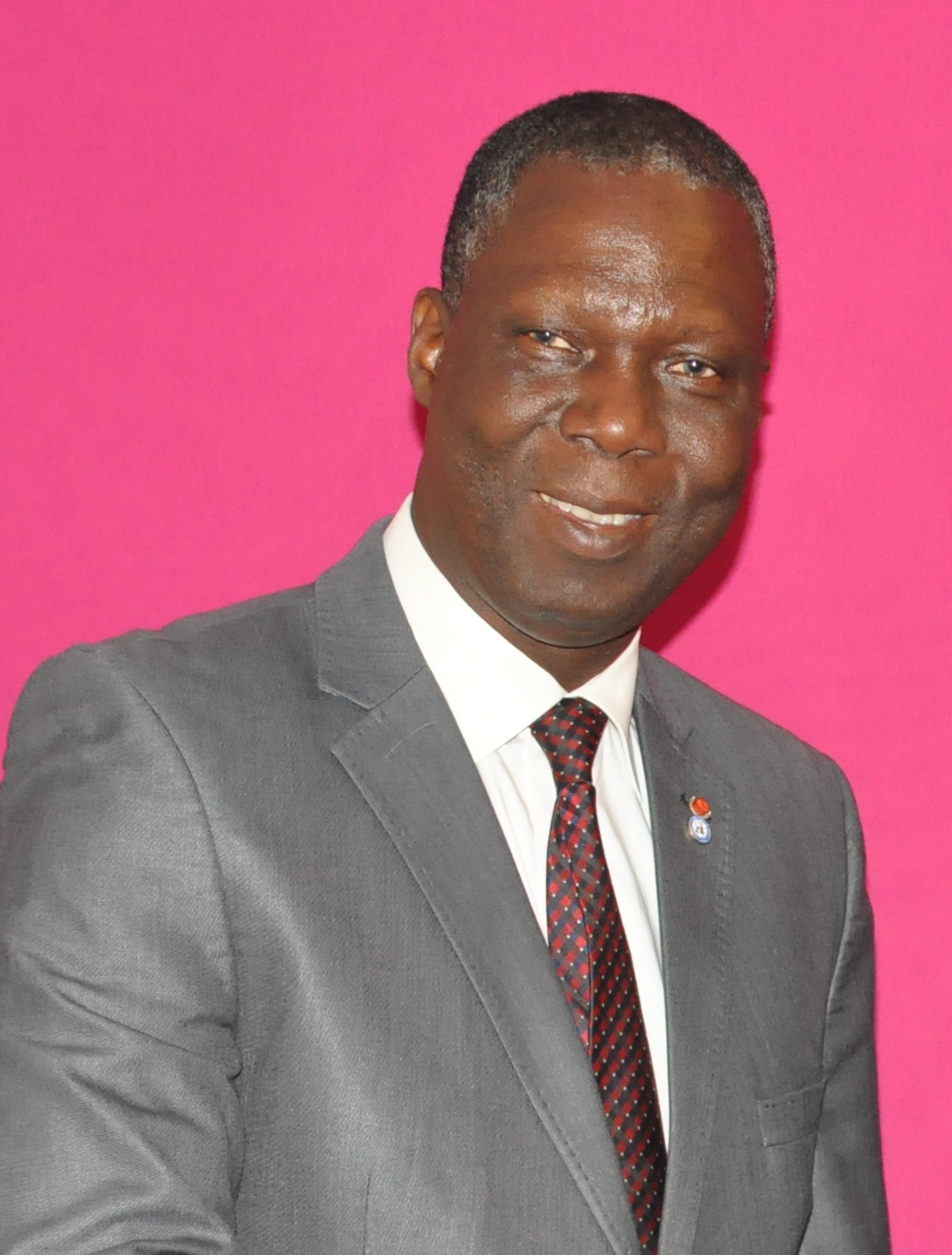
Maurice Bandaman Au Salon du livre de Paris 2015.

== Life ==
He was born in Toumodi, Ivory Coast. He was awarded the "Grand prix littéraire d'Afrique noire" in 1993. From 2000 to 2004, he was President of the Writers' Association of Côte d'Ivoire (AECI). In May 2011, Maurice Bandaman became part of the Guillaume Soro government as Minister of Culture and Francophone. On 13 March 2012, he was renewed for the same position in the government of Jeannot Kouadio-Ahoussou.

His work is subject to a global study by Pierre N'Da: Écriture romanesque de Maurice Bandaman, ou La quête d'une esthétique africaine moderne.

== Works ==
=== Novels ===
- Une femme pour une médaille, recueil de nouvelles
- MêMe au Paradis, on pleure quelquefois (2000)
- La bible Et le fusil
- Le fils de La femme−mâle
- L'amour est toujours ailleurs
- CôTe d'Ivoire: chronique d'une guerre annoncée

=== Theater ===
- La Terre qui pleure (finalist of RFI’S contest In 1998)
- Au nom de La terre

=== Poetry ===
- Nouvelles chansons d'amour

=== Children book ===
- Sikagnima, La fille aux larmes d'or
