= Ahmadou Kourouma =

Ivorian novelist (1927–2003)

- Born: 24 November 1927; Boundiali, Côte d'Ivoire
- Died: 11 December 2003 (aged 76); Lyon, France
- Writing career
- Language: French
- Genre: Novel
- Notable works: Les Soleils des indépendances; En attendant le vote des bêtes sauvages; Allah n'est pas obligé
- Notable awards: Prix Renaudot; Prix Goncourt des Lycéens

Ahmadou Kourouma (24 November 1927 – 11 December 2003) was an Ivorian novelist.

== Life ==
The eldest son of a distinguished Malinké family, Ahmadou Kourouma was born in 1927 in Boundiali, Côte d'Ivoire. Raised by his uncle, he initially pursued studies in Bamako, Mali. From 1950 to 1954, when his country was still under French colonial control, he participated in French military campaigns in Indochina, after which he journeyed to France to study mathematics in Lyon.

Kourouma returned to his native Côte d'Ivoire after it won its independence in 1960, yet he quickly found himself questioning the government of Félix Houphouët-Boigny. After a brief imprisonment, Kourouma spent several years in exile, first in Algeria (1964–69), then in Cameroon (1974–84) and Togo (1984–94), before finally returning to live in Côte d'Ivoire.

Determined to speak out against the betrayal of legitimate African aspirations at the dawn of independence, Kourouma was drawn into an experiment in fiction. His first novel, Les Soleils des indépendances (The Suns of Independence, 1970) contains a critical treatment of post-colonial governments in Africa. Twenty years later, his second book Monnè, outrages et défis, a history of a century of colonialism, was published. In 1998, he published En attendant le vote des bêtes sauvages (translated as Waiting for the Wild Beasts to Vote), a satire of postcolonial Africa in the style of Voltaire, with elements of the Epic of Sundiata, in which a griot recounts the story of a tribal hunter's transformation into a dictator, inspired by president Gnassingbé Eyadéma of Togo. In 2000, he published Allah n'est pas obligé (translated as Allah is Not Obliged), a tale of an orphan who becomes a child soldier when travelling to visit his aunt in Liberia.

At the outbreak of civil war in Côte d'Ivoire in 2002, Kourouma stood against the war as well as against the concept of Ivorian nationalism, calling it "an absurdity which has led us to chaos". President Laurent Gbagbo accused him of supporting rebel groups from the north of the country.

In France, each of Kourouma's novels was greeted with great acclaim, sold exceptionally well, and was showered with prizes, including the Prix Renaudot in the year 2000 and the Prix Goncourt des Lycéens for Allah n'est pas obligé. In the English-speaking world, Kourouma has yet to make much of an impression: despite some positive reviews, his work remains largely unknown outside university classes in African fiction. Allah Is Not Obliged received its first English translation in 2006.

At the time of his death, in Lyon, Kourouma was working on a sequel to Allah n'est pas obligé, entitled Quand on refuse on dit non (translated roughly as "When One Disagrees, One Says No"), in which the protagonist of the first novel, a child soldier, is demobilized and returns to his home in Côte d'Ivoire, where a new regional conflict has arisen.

== Bibliography ==
- Les Soleils des indépendances, Presses de l'Université de Montréal, 1968
  - The Suns of Independence, Translator Adrian Adams, Holmes & Meier, 1981, ISBN 978-0-8419-0747-8
- Le diseur de vérité — drama, 1972; Acoria, 1998, ISBN 978-2-912525-14-7
- Monnè, Éditions du Seuil, 1990, ISBN 978-2-02-011426-4
  - Monnew: a novel, Translator Nidra Poller, Mercury House, 1993, ISBN 978-1-56279-027-1
- En attendant le vote des bêtes sauvages, Éditions du Seuil, 1998, ISBN 978-2-02-033142-5
  - Waiting for the Vote of the Wild Animals. Translated by Carrol F. Coates. University of Virginia Press. 2001. ISBN 978-0-8139-2022-1.
  - Waiting for the Wild Beasts to Vote. Translated by Frank Wynne. Heinemann. 2003. ISBN 978-0-434-00814-8.
- Yacouba, chasseur africain. 1998.; Illustrators Claude Millet, Denise Millet; Editions Gallimard, 2011, ISBN 978-2-07-063015-8
- Allah n'est pas obligé, Seuil, 2000, ISBN 9782020427876
  - Allah Is Not Obliged. Translated by Frank Wynne. Heinemann. 2006. ISBN 978-0-434-00957-2.; Random House Digital, Inc., 2007, ISBN 978-0-307-27957-6
- Quand on refuse on dit non, Editor Gilles Carpentier, Éditions du Seuil, 2005, ISBN 978-2-02-082721-8

== Awards and honours ==
- Grand prix littéraire d'Afrique noire (1969), for Les Soleils des indépendances
- Prix Maillé-Latour-Landry (1970), for Les Soleils des indépendances
- Prix Tropiques (1998), for En attendant le vote des bêtes sauvages
- Grand prix Poncetton (1998), for En attendant le vote des bêtes sauvages
- Prix du Livre Inter (1999), for En attendant le vote des bêtes sauvages
- Grand prix Jean-Giono (2000), for Allah n'est pas obligé
- Prix Renaudot (2000), for Allah n'est pas obligé
- Prix Goncourt des Lycéens (2000), for Allah n'est pas obligé
- Prix Amerigo Vespucci (2000), for Allah n'est pas obligé

== Relevant literature ==
- Wuteh Vakunta, Peter. “Malinkelisation of French [Proverbs] in Ahmadou Kourouma’s Les soleils des indépendances.” Being and Becoming African as a Permanent Work in Progress: Inspiration from Chinua Achebe’s Proverbs. Eds. Francis B. Nyamnjoh, Patrick Nwosu, and Hassan M. Yosimbom. Mankon, Bamenda (Cameroon): Langaa Research & Publishing, 2021. 281-296.
- Gassama, Makhily. 1995. La langue d'Ahmadou Kourouma, ou Le francais sous le soleil d'Afrique. Karthala and ACCT.
