= Bernard Binlin Dadié =

Ivorian writer and politician (1916–2019)

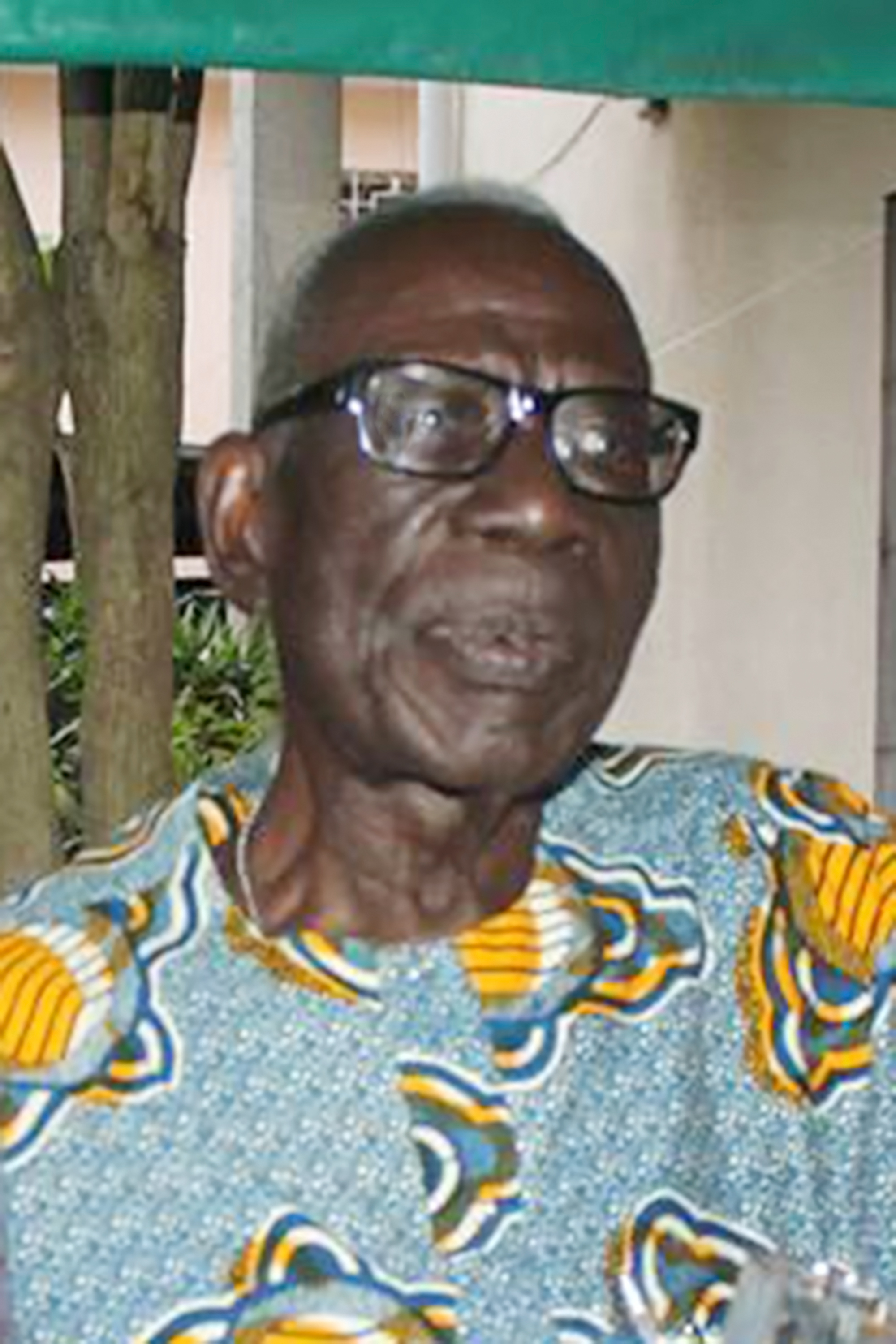
- Born: 10 January 1916; Assinie-Mafia
- Died: 9 March 2019
- Citizenship: Ivory Coast
- Occupations: Poet, Writer, Politician, Screenwriter, Playwright

Bernard Binlin Dadié (10 January 1916 – 9 March 2019) was an Ivorian novelist, playwright, poet, and governmental administrator. Starting in 1957, he held many governmental positions in the Côte d'Ivoire, including Minister of Culture from 1977 to 1986.

== Biography ==
Dadié was born in Assinie, Côte d'Ivoire, and attended the local Catholic school in Grand Bassam and then the Ecole William Ponty. He worked for the French government in Dakar, Senegal, at the Institut français d’Afrique noire, then returned to his homeland in 1947. He became part of its movement for independence. Before Côte d'Ivoire's independence in 1960, he was detained for sixteen months for taking part in demonstrations that opposed the French colonial government.

In his writing, influenced by his experiences of colonialism as a child, Dadié attempts to connect the messages of traditional African folktales with the contemporary world. With Germain Coffi Gadeau and F. J. Amon d'Aby, he founded the Cercle Culturel et Folklorique de la Côte d'Ivoire (CCFCI) in 1953. In 1955, he published a collection called The Black Cloth: A Collection of African Folktales (in French).

Dadié was rediscovered with the release of Steven Spielberg's 1997 movie Amistad which features the music by American composer John Williams. The choral text of Dadié's poem, "Dry Your Tears, Afrika" (“Sèche Tes Pleurs“) is used for a song of the same name. Published in 1967, the poem is about coming home to Africa.

Dadié was the brother of politician Hortense Aka-Anghui. He turned 100 in January 2016 and died in Abidjan in March 2019 at the age of 103.

== Awards ==
Dadié received several awards in recognition of his literary career, with one of the last being the Grand Prix des Mécènes of the GPLA in 2016.

== Main works ==
- Afrique debout (1950)
- Légendes africaines (1954)
- Le pagne noir (1955)
- La ronde des jours (1956)
- Climbié (1956)
- Un Nègre à Paris (1959)
- Patron de New York (1964)
- Hommes de tous les continents (1967)
- La ville où nul ne meurt (1969)
- Monsieur Thôgô-Gnini (1970)
- Les voix dans le vent (1970)
- Béatrice du Congo (1970)
- Îles de tempête (1973)
- Papassidi maître-escroc (1975)
- Mhoi cheul (1979)
- Opinions d'un nègre (1979)
- Les belles histoires de Kacou Ananzè
- Commandant Taureault et ses nègres (1980)
- Les jambes du fils de Dieu (1980)
- Carnets de prison (1981) – details his time in prison
- Les contes de Koutou-as-Samala (1982)
- Escale dans le temps : le combat pour la dignité de l'Afrique (2017)
