= Grand prix du roman métis =

French literary award

The Grand prix du roman métis is a French literary award established in 2010 by the city of Saint-Denis-de-La Réunion. It rewards a French-language novel published less than a year ago and which emphasizes the values of multiracialism, multiculturalism and humanism. The institution also awards each year the Prix du roman métis des lycéens and the Prix du roman métis des lecteurs de la ville de Saint-Denis. Each prize is worth 5000 euros.

== Jury ==
The jury comes from the book world and includes the winners of the previous year’s award.

== List of winners ==
=== Grand prix du roman métis ===
Year	Author	Title	Publisher (x times)	Notes
2010	Maryse Condé	En attendant la montée des eaux	Jean-Claude Lattès	
2011	Lyonel Trouillot	La Belle Amour humaine	Actes Sud	
2012	Tierno Monénembo	Le Terroriste noir	Le Seuil	
2013	Leonora Miano	La Saison de l'ombre	Grasset	
2014	In Koli Jean Bofane	Congo Inc.	Actes Sud (2)	
2015	Mohamed Mbougar Sarr	Terre ceinte	Présence africaine	
2016	Douna Loup	L'Oragé	Mercure de France	
2017	Yamen Manai	L'Amas ardent	Elyzad	
2018	Jadd Hilal	Des ailes au loin	Elyzad(2)	
2019	Laurent Gaudé	Salina, les trois exils	Actes Sud(3)	
2020	Gaëlle Bélem	Un monstre est là, derrière la porte	Gallimard	
2021	Akli Tadjer	D'Amour et de Guerre	Éditions Les Escales	
2022	Ananda Devi	Le Rire des déesses	Grasset	
2023	Xavier Le Clerc	Un homme sans titre	Gallimard	
2024	Rachid Benzine	Les silences des pères	Le Seuil	
2025	Karim Kattan	L’Éden à l’aube	Elyzad	

=== Prix du roman métis des lycéens ===
Year	Author	Title	Publisher (x times)	Notes
2011	Delphine Coulin	Samba pour la France	éditions du Seuil	
2012	Carole Zalberg	À défaut d’Amérique	Actes Sud	
2013	Cécile Ladjali	Shâb ou la nuit	Actes Sud(2)	
2014	Guillaume Staelens	Itinéraire d'un poète apache	éditions Viviane Hamy	
2015	Mohamed Mbougar Sarr	Terre ceinte	Présence africaine	
2016	Mbarek Ould Beyrouk	Le Tambour des larmes	Elyzad	
2017	Nathacha Appanah	Tropique de la violence	Gallimard	
2018	Jadd Hilal	Des ailes au loin	Elyzad(2)	
2019	Laurent Gaudé	Salina, les trois exils	Actes Sud(3)	
2020	ex aequo Kaouther Adimi and Caroline Laurent	Les Petits de décembre and Rivage de la colère	éditions du Seuil(2) and éditions Les Escales	
2021	Djaïli Amadou Amal	Les Impatientes	Éditions Emmanuelle Collas	également prix Goncourt des lycéens
2022	Yamen Manai	Bel abîme	Elyzad	Tunisie
2023	Leïla Bouherrafa	Tu mérites un pays	Allary éditions	
2024	Éric Chacour	Ce que je sais de toi	éditions Philippe Rey	
2025	Delphine Minoui	Badjens	Le Seuil	

=== Prix du roman métis des lecteurs de la ville de Saint-Denis ===
Year	Author	Title	Publisher (x times)	Notes
2017	Nathacha Appanah	Tropique de la violence	Gallimard	
2018	Mohamed Mbougar Sarr	Silence du chœur	Présence africaine	
2019	Laurent Gaudé	Salina, les trois exils	Actes Sud	
2020	Caroline Laurent	Rivage de la colère	éditions Les Escales	
2021	Émilienne Malfatto	Que sur toi se lamente le tigre	Éditions Elyzad	also prix Goncourt du premier roman
2022	Ananda Devi	Le Rire des déesses	Grasset	
2023	Marie-Claude Derby	M’a vi oute fiy	Éditions du 20 Décembre	
2024	Beata Umubyeyi Mairesse	Le Convoi	Flammarion	

=== Special mentions ===
- 2018 : Jury special mention for Un océan, deux mers, trois continents by Wilfried N'Sondé, Actes Sud
- 2019 : Jury special mention for Là où les chiens aboient par la queue by Estelle-Sarah Bulle, éditions Liana Levi.
