= COMAR d'Or =

Tunisian literary award

- Awarded for: Best Arabic and best French novel in Tunisia
- Country: Tunisia
- Presented by: COMAR
- Arabic French: Tarek Chibani Rafik Darragi and Mohamed Bouamoud
- Website: https://comar-d-or.comar.tn/

The COMAR d'Or is a series of Tunisian literary prizes created in 1996 by the Compagnie méditerranéenne d'assurances et de réassurances (COMAR), with the support of the Tunisian Ministry of Culture. The first award was given in 1997.

Presented in April of each year at the Municipal Theater of Tunis, or at the Palais des Congrès in 2016 and 2017, these prizes award novels written in French or Arabic by Tunisian authors and published in the previous year.

There are three levels of award: the main COMAR d'Or prize, the Committee's Special Prize and the Discovery Prize (for new authors).

== Current and past winners ==
Round	Language	Comar d'or	Committee's Special Prize	Discovery	Other Prizes
2019	Arabic	Lella Sayda by Tarek Chibani	Sakakine Aamya by Abdelkader Alimi	Maazak Tchaïkovski by Chawki Barnoussi	-
2019	French	Jugurtha, un contre-portrait by Rafik Darragi and La princesse de Bizerte by Mohamed Bouamoud (ex-æquo)	none awarded	L'amant de la mer by Alyssa Belghith	-
2018	French	Les Lendemains d'hier by Ali Bécheur	La Marmite d'Ayoub by Ridha Ben Hamouda	Non décerné	-
2018	Arabic	La Fille de l'enfer by Khairia Boubtane	Menzel Bourguiba by Ines Abassi	Si seulement Chahda... ! by Safia Gam Ben Abdeljellil	-
2017	French	Passe l'intrus by Béchir Garbouj and L'Amas ardent by Yamen Manaï	Le Chant des ruelles obscures by Ahmed Mahfoudh et Il pleut des avions de Gilbert Naccache	Rupture(s) by Jamila Ben Mustapha	Special Prize l'IFT : C'était hier à Tunis : Mardochée se souvient… de Paul Zeitoun
2017	Arabic	Jihaad Naeem (Soft Jihad) by Mohamed Aïssa Meddeb	Safar El Qualb (Voyage du cœur) by Amina Zrig	Hamden Wazzaman by Habib Ben Mehrez	-
2016	French	Le Corps de ma mère by Fawzia Zouari and Ya Khil Salem by Fawzi Mellah	Les Rêves perdus de Leyla by Mohamed Harmel	Le Jasmin noir by Wafa Ghorbel	-
2016	Arabic	Maraya El Ghieb (Mirror of absence) and Toujane d'Emna Rmili Oueslati	El Massab (Le Dépotoir) by Chedia Kasmi and Sairatou El Maatouh (Biographie d'un simplet) by Mouldi Dhaou	Katariss by Hanene Jenane	-
2015	French	Les Trois Grâces by Anouar Attia	none awarded	Dix-Neuf by Sami Mokaddem	-
2015	Arabic	al-Talyani (الطلياني (The Italian)) by Shukri Mabkhout	Bey El Orbane (Le Bey des bédouins) by Jamel Jelassi	Zahret Abbad Echams (Tournesol) by Nabil Keddiche	-
2014	French	Je suis né huit fois by Saber Mansouri	D.A.B.D.A. by Khaoula Hosni	Le Destin apprivoisé by Néjib Turki	-
2014	Arabic	Diwan El Mawajii (Book of Pains) by Mohamed Bardi	El Béki (Ce qui reste) by Emna Rmili Oueslati	Bab El Bhar by Fethi Jmail	-
2013	French	Le Panache des brisants by Mokhtar Sahnoun	Souffle de la bête immonde by Sami Kourda	Le Sculpteur des masques by Mohamed Harmel	-
2013	Arabic	None awarded	Rihla Hentatiya (Pérégrination des Hentati) by Abdelkader Ltifi by El Araâ (Dénuement) de Hafidha Gara	Fi Inthidar Assaâ Essefer by Abdelhamid Erraï	-
2012	French	Jeux de rubans d'Emna Belhadj Yahia by Ouatann d'Azza Filali	Les Caves du minustaire by Rafik Ben Salah	La Prostituée de Babylone by Mohamed Dallagi	First novel : Zitoyen by Med Ridha Ben Hamouda
2012	Arabic	Achiket Adem (Adam's lover) by Moncef Ouhaïbi	Inkissar Adhil (Shadow's breaking) by Nasr Belhaj Bettaieb	El Maristan (L'Asile des fous) by Mhadheb Sboui	First novel : Bouslat Sidi Anna by Salem Labbene
2010	French	Le Transfert des cendres by Fawzi Mellah	L'Heure du cru by Azza Filali	Le Regard du loup by Soufiane Ben Farhat	Prix mention spéciale : Les Années de la honte by Mohamed Bouamoud
2010	Arabic	Tafassilon Saghiraton (Smal details) by Noureddine El Aloui	Ramad El Hayet (Cendre de vie) by Hassouna Mosbahi	Arrahilou Charkan (Migration vers l'Est) by Ahmed Essalmi	Special mention : Kai'ïnâtoun Moujannaha (Créatures ailées) by Hassan Nasr and Marwan Fi Bilad El Jan (Marwan au pays des djinns) by Amor Ben Salem
2009	French	La Marche de l'incertitude by Yamen Manaï	Nos Ancêtres les scorpions ou la naissance d'un dieu by Lotfi Ben Letaïfa	Visages by Mohamed Bouamoud	First novel prize : Leïla ou la femme de l'aube de Sonia Chamkhi
2009	Arabic	Hay Bab Souika by Abdelkader Ben Haj Nasr	El Rajoulou El Âari (L'Homme nu) by Boubaker Ayadi	Achiriât an nawares by Dhaou Bessaoud	First novel prize : Hebni Ajinha d'Afifa Saoudi
2008	French	Un Après-midi dans le désert by Mustapha Tlili	Sais-tu seulement ce que vivre veut dire by Wafa Bsaïes	Ce que Tunis ne m'a pas dit by Khaouthar Khelifi	-
2008	Arabic	Lawn El Rouh (Color of the soul)	Khaadaât El Asr (Le mensonge du siècle) by Mounir Raqqi	El Waghd (Réminiscences) by Kheireddine Souabni	-
2006	Arabic	Ḥūriyya (Nymph) by Hafiz Mahmoud	Māystrū (Maestro) by Amel Mokhtar	-	Special mention: Baab al-villa by Husayn bin Amru
