= Prytanée militaire de Saint-Louis =

Coordinates: 16.0630°N 16.4558°W

Saint-Louis Military Academy
- Prytanée Militaire de Saint-Louis (PMS)
- Saint-Louis; Senegal

Information
- Type: Public educational institution
- Motto: "Savoir pour mieux servir" (Knowledge to better serve)
- Established: 1923
- President: Colonel Abdoulaye Mbengue
- Enrollment: 500
- Language: French, English, Spanish, Arabic, German, Latin
- Website: prytanee.sn

The Prytanée militaire de Saint-Louis (English: Saint-Louis Military Academy), officially the Military Academy Charles Ntchorere of Saint Louis (French: Prytanée militaire Charles N’Tchoréré de Saint-Louis) is a Senegalese secondary school under the authority of the Ministry of the Armed Forces and located in Saint-Louis. It brings together the best students in Senegal, who have distinguished themselves in a highly selective competition held throughout the country. Each year, 50 students are chosen from over 3,000 applicants, all of whom are boys. In addition to these 50, about fifteen other students from other countries are also accepted. It is considered the best school in Senegal.

== History ==
=== Early years ===
The Saint-Louis Military Children's School was established in 1923 and welcomed its first students the following year at Camp Oudeoud in the Pointe Nord District of Saint-Louis.

The school's mission was to meet the needs of French West Africa for leaders with intellectual and technical training. Recruitment was open to the sons of active-duty military personnel, canton chiefs, and other prominent figures. The students received primary education that led them to the primary school certificate and then to higher primary education. Upon completion of this training, the students joined a platoon of the 1st Senegalese Tirailleurs Regiment. In 1926, a platoon specifically for alumni of the school was created.

In 1938, the Military Children's School was attached to the Headquarters Company (CHR) and placed under the authority of the officer commanding that unit. The school was later placed under the command of Captain Charles N'Tchoréré. Charles N'Tchoréré was a Gabonese French military officer who later would be shot by Germans in World War II. His time there profoundly marked the school, and his influence and legend continue to this day. Among the teachers was Mamadou Dia, former Prime Minister of Senegal .

In 1946, the school was transferred to the Dakhar Bango camp. From 1949 onwards, primary classes were progressively abolished and replaced by middle school classes of 6th, 5th , 4th and 3rd grade.

=== Post-independence ===
In 1953, the school changed its status and name on that date to become the Charles N'Tchoréré African Military Preparatory School (EMPA), with the motto: "Unite, always serve France-Africa". In June 1973, The school changed its name for the second time: becoming the Military Academy Charles Ntchorere of Saint Louis (PMS). It was headed for the first time by a Senegalese officer in 1974. This was Commandant Papa Assane Mbodj. In 1994 and 1995, the PMS won the international competition for Young Geniuses .

== Alumni ==
- General Antou Pierre Ndiaye, Inspector General of the Armed Forces
- Mohamed Mbougar Sarr, Senegalese writer who won the 2021 Prix Goncourt for his novel The Most Secret Memory of Men, becoming the first Sub-Saharan African to do so.
- Cheikh Tidiane Gadio
- Abdoulaye Bathily, former Special Representative and Head of the United Nations Support Mission in Libya
- Vice Admiral Oumar Wade, Chief of the General Staff

== See also ==
- Suvorov Military School
