= Yambo Ouologuem =

Malian writer (1940–2017)

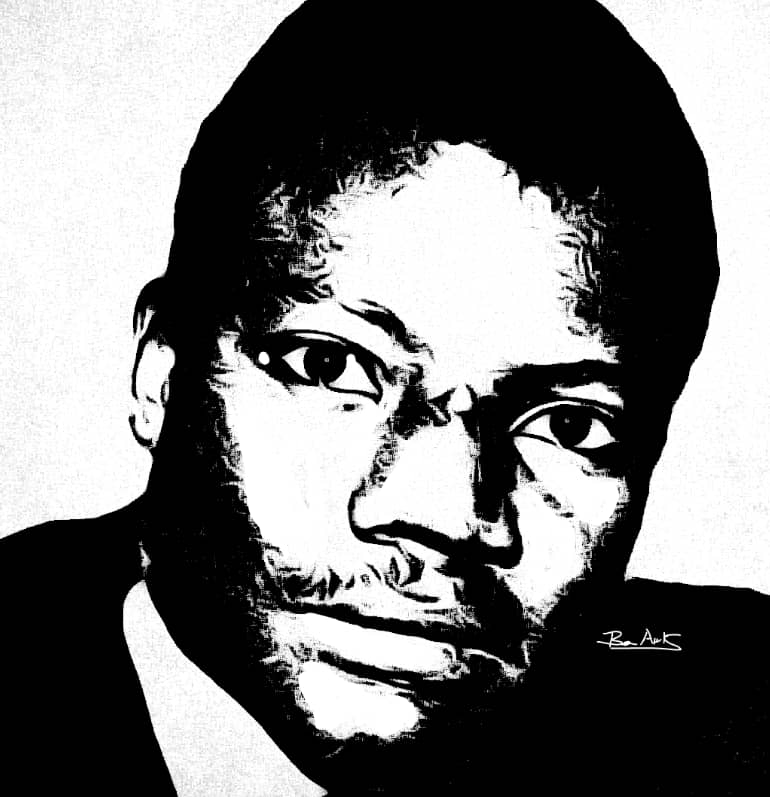
- Born: 22 August 1940; Bandiagara, Mali
- Died: 14 October 2017 (aged 77); Sévaré, Mali
- Citizenship: Malian
- Education: Doctorate of Sociology
- Alma mater: École Normale Supérieure, Paris
- Occupations: Teacher, Marabout
- Writing career
- Pen name: Utto Rodolph
- Period: 1968–1984
- Genres: Historical fiction, Essay, Poetry
- Notable works: Le devoir de violence (1968); Lettre à la France nègre (1969); Les mille et une bibles du sexe (1969)
- Notable awards: Prix Renaudot; 1968 'Le devoir de violence'

Yambo Ouologuem (22 August 1940 – 14 October 2017) was a Malian writer. His first novel, Le devoir de violence (English: Bound to Violence, 1968), won the Prix Renaudot. He later published Lettre à la France nègre (1969), and Les mille et une bibles du sexe (1969) under the pseudonym Utto Rodolph. Le devoir de violence was initially well-received, but critics later charged that Ouologuem had plagiarized passages from Graham Greene and other established authors such as André Schwartz-Bart. Ouologuem turned away from the Western press as a result of the matter, and remained reclusive for the rest of his life.

== Life ==
Yambo Ouologuem was born an only son in an aristocratic Tidjaniya Malian family in 1940 in Bandiagara, the main city in the Dogon region of Mali (then a part of French Soudan). His father, Boukary Ouologuem, was a prominent landowner and school inspector. He learned several African languages and gained fluency in French, English, and Spanish. After matriculating at a Lycée in the capital city of Bamako, he went to Paris in 1960, where he studied sociology, philosophy and English at Lycée Henry IV and from 1964 to 1966 he taught at the Lycée de Charenton in suburban Paris, while studying for a doctorate in sociology at the École Normale Supérieure.

His major work, Le devoir de violence (1968), resulted in controversy and a continuing academic debate over charges of plagiarism. In 1969, he published a volume of biting essays, Lettre à la France nègre as well as an erotic novel, Les mille et une bibles du sexe, published under the pseudonym of Utto Rodolph. After the plagiarism controversy over Le devoir de violence, Ouologuem returned to Mali in the late seventies. Until 1984, he was the director of a youth centre in the small town of Sévaré near Mopti in central Mali, where he wrote and edited a series of children's textbooks. He is reputed to have led a secluded Islamic life as a marabout until his death on 14 October 2017 in Sévaré, aged 77.

== Le devoir de violence ==
Le devoir de violence (published in English as Bound to Violence) was published in 1968 by Editions du Seuil. It was met with wide critical acclaim, winning the Prix Renaudot that very year, the first African author to do so. Ouologuem became a celebrity, and Le Monde called him one of "the rare intellectuals of international stature presented to the world by Black Africa", comparing him to Leopold Sedar Senghor. It was translated into English (Bound to Violence) by Ralph Manheim in 1971. Ouologuem's novel is harshly critical of African nationalism, and "reserves its greatest hostility for the violence Africans committed against other Africans". Some critics felt that the praise and initial response of "authenticity" for the novel, which is often historically inaccurate, was a Western response. These critics viewed it as a rejection of a glorified view of African history: a review in The Nation said that Ouologuem had "shattered the ... myth of a glorious African past".

However, the novel was soon mired in controversy, as some of its passages appeared to have been plagiarized from Graham Greene's It's a Battlefield (first published in 1934) and the French novel The Last of the Just (Le dernier des justes, 1959) by Andre Schwartz-Bart. After a lawsuit by Greene, the book was banned in France, and has only as recently as 2018 been re-published there. At the time, Ouologuem claimed that he had originally used quotations on some of the controversial passages and that the quotations were deleted by his editor, but his original manuscript is not available to verify this; this fact was not denied by his publisher. He also claimed that in some early interviews, he had openly spoken of excerpting these passages, which is why it was not as controversial in France. Since 1977, the English edition has carried the note: "The Publishers acknowledge the use of certain passages on pages 54–56 from It's a Battlefield by Graham Greene." Despite the controversy, the novel remains one of the landmarks of postcolonial African literature, notable for its "cultural sweep: legends, myths, chronicles, religious matter woven into an opulent narrative; for eloquence: the cadence and music of the prose".

Le devoir de violence delineates the seven-and-a-half centuries of history of central Mali (specifically, the Dogon region), from 1202 to 1947, when a fictitious nation, Nakem-Zuiko, is on the threshold of independence. The first part of the book deals with several powerful Malian empires, particularly the pre-colonial Toucouleur Empire which had Bandiagara as its capital, and the pre-Islamic Bambara Empire it replaced. It points out how African rulers collaborated with the slave traders, selling a hundred million citizens to be carried off into slavery. The narrative is marked by violence and eroticism, depicting sorcery and black magic as natural human activity. In the second, colonial part of the story, the protagonist, Raymond Spartacus Kassoumi, descended from slaves, is sent to France to be groomed for a political career. The story also highlights the process by which servility or "negraille" (a word coined by Ouologuem) is ingrained in the black population.

== Other writings ==
Ouologuem's best-known works were republished in English and edited by Christopher Wise in The Yambo Ouologuem Reader: The Duty of Violence, A Black Ghostwriter's Letter to France and The Thousand and One Bibles of Sex (Africa World Press, 2008). His legacy is explored in a contemporary light in Yambo Ouologuem: Postcolonial Writer, Islamic Militant, a 1999 anthology, also edited by Wise, which includes an account of Wise's own attempt to find Ouologuem in Africa. Wise called "Ouologuem's decision to return to Mali and wash his hands of writing in French ... an incalculable loss to world literature."

Ouologuem also wrote poetry, some of which appeared in the journal Nouvelle Somme. He is anthologized in Poems of Black Africa (ed. Wole Soyinka, 1975) and The Penguin Book of Modern African Poetry (ed. Gerald Moore and Ulli Beier, 1984).

== Influence and legacy ==
Le devoir de violence has been defended by a number of critics including Kwame Anthony Appiah, who views it as a rejection of the "first generation of modern African novels — the generation of Achebe's Things Fall Apart and Laye's L'Enfant noir".

Jean-Frédéric de Hasque's 2009 documentary Où est l'Eldorado? (In Search of Eldorado) sporadically mentions Ouologuem's life and writings. The film focused on a group of Malian university students in Sévaré, the town where he lived, all of whom were inspired by his work. Ouologuem himself did not appear in the documentary, as one town resident cautioned de Hasque against getting too close to the author's house while filming.

Senegalese writer Mohamed Mbougar Sarr's novel La plus secrète mémoire des hommes, which won the Prix Goncourt in 2021, is inspired by Ouologuem's experiences in French publishing.

In 2023, it was announced that Penguin Modern Classics would be publishing a new English edition of Bound to Violence in March 2024, with an introduction by Malian scholar Chérif Keïta.
