= Caroline Laurent =

French novelist (born 1988)

- Born: 1988 (age 37–38)
- Education: Paris-Sorbonne University
- Occupations: Novelist; editor; memoirist
- Writing career
- Language: French

Caroline Laurent (born 1988) is a French novelist, memoirist and editor. Her books include Et soudain, la liberté (2017), co-written with Évelyne Pisier and completed after Pisier's death, and Rivage de la colère (2020), a novel about the expulsion of the Chagossians that was published in English as An Impossible Return (2022). Both novels received multiple literary awards.

== Biography ==
Laurent was born in 1988. Her mother's family is from Mauritius. She studied modern literature at the Paris-Sorbonne University.

Her first novel, Et soudain, la liberté ("And suddenly, freedom") was co-written with Évelyne Pisier; Laurent completed the novel after Pisier's death. It was a fictionalised account of Pisier's life. Laurent received assistance from Pisier's husband, Olivier Duhamel, to finish the novel. It received the Prix Marguerite-Duras, the Grand Prix des Lycéennes from ELLE, and the Prix Première Plume.

Her second novel, Rivage de la colère (The shores of anger), was published in 2020. It is about the expulsion of the Chagossians from the Chagos Archipelago in the 1960s and 1970s. For this work she received the Prix Maison de la Presse, the Grand prix des blogueurs, the Prix du roman métis des lycéens (shared with Kaouther Adimi), the Grand prix du roman métis des lecteurs, and the Prix Paul-Bourdarie.

Rivage de la colère was translated into English by Jeffrey Zuckerman and published in English under the title An Impossible Return (2022). A review by Yagnishsing Dawoor in World Literature Today describes Laurent as a "clever, spirited storyteller" who "knows exactly what to reap and thresh from history". He concludes that Laurent's "immensely affecting novel shows us that the pain and the blood, the hope—if held onto with enough might and conviction, through the tears—are everything".

Her third book, Ce que nous désirons le plus, was published in 2022. It is an autobiographical work about her experiences after the Duhamel scandal; she had come to view Olivier Duhamel as a kind of surrogate father when collaborating on finishing Et soudain, la liberté, and the scandal forced her to reconsider her friendship with him and with Pisier (who knew about the abuse).

Laurent held the Randell Cottage Writers' Residency in 2022/23.

== Selected works ==
- Et soudain, la liberté ("And suddenly, freedom") (Les Escales, 2017), with Évelyne Pisier
- Rivage de la colère ("The shores of anger") (Les Escales, 2020); published in English as An Impossible Return (AmazonCrossing, 2022), translated by Jeffrey Zuckerman
- Ce que nous désirons le plus (Les Escales, 2022)
