= Éditions Elyzad =

Éditions Elyzad is a publishing house founded in Tunis in 2005 by Élisabeth Daldoul, a French-Palestinian publisher who grew up in Dakar and lives in Tunisia. Since 2020, the company has also been based in Paris.

Elyzad primarily publishes works of literature, mainly fiction in French. Its editorial mission is to promote the voices of contemporary writers from the Arab and African worlds—and beyond—aiming to circulate texts from the south to the north of the Mediterranean and throughout the Francophone world.

The publisher’s catalogue includes established authors such as Leïla Sebbar, Tahar Bekri, Sophie Bessis, and Cécile Oumhani, while also introducing new literary voices such as Yamen Manaï, Ilf-Eddine, Azza Filali, Jadd Hilal, and Karim Kattan.

In 2011, Elyzad received the Alioune Diop Prize, awarded by the Organisation internationale de la Francophonie and a consortium of around fifteen publishing houses. Named after the pioneer of African publishing and founder of Présence africaine, the prize honors “a publisher distinguished by the quality of their output.”

By the 2020s, Elyzad had emerged as one of the key players in the Francophone literary scene. Its growing reputation has been reinforced by numerous literary awards won by its authors, including the Prix Goncourt du premier roman (2021) awarded to Émilienne Malfatto for Que sur toi se lamente le Tigre—the publisher’s most prestigious recognition to date—as well as the Prix des cinq continents de la francophonie, won by Yamen Manaï in 2017 for L’Amas ardent and by Karim Kattan in 2021 for Le Palais des deux collines.

In 2020, Elyzad opened a Paris office, managed by editor Vanessa Pécastaings.
