= Gaëlle Bélem =

Réunionese, French-language author (born 1984)

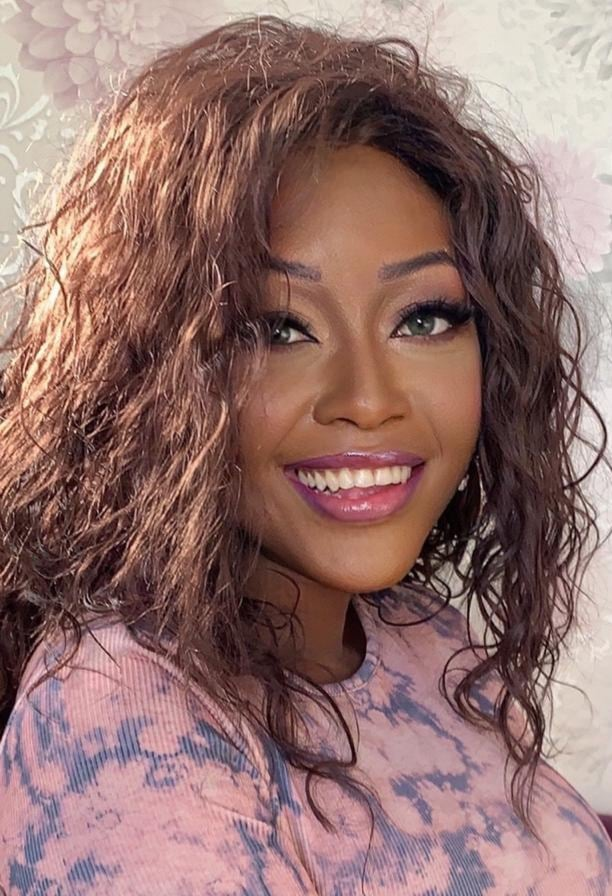
- Gaëlle Bélem in 2020
- Born: November 14, 1984 (age 41); Saint-Benoît, Réunion
- Education: Lycée Pierre-de-Fermat; École pratique des hautes études Paris 1 Panthéon-Sorbonne University
- Occupations: Latin, history and geography teacher, journalist, novelist
- Writing career
- Language: French
- Notable works: Un monstre est là, derrière la porte (2020), Le fruit le plus rare ou la vie d'Edmond Albius (2023)
- Notable awards: Grand prix du roman métis 2020; Prix André Dubreuil du Premier Roman 2020 for a debut novel 2020 (Société des gens de lettres, SGDL)

Gaëlle Bélem (born 1984) is a French writer of Réunionese extraction. She is best known for the coming-of-age novel Un monstre est là, derrière la porte (2020; English translation There's a Monster Behind the Door, 2024), and the historical novel Le fruit le plus rare: ou la vie d'Edmond Albius (2023; English translation The Rarest Fruit: The Life of Edmond Albius, 2025). Bélem has won the Grand prix du roman métis, the Société des gens de lettres André-Dubreuil prize for a first novel, and the Republic of Consciousness Prize. She has been a finalist for the Prix des cinq continents de la francophonie and has been longlisted for the International Booker Prize.

== Biography ==
Gaëlle Bélem was born in Saint-Benoît, Réunion. She grew up in modest circumstances and has been writing since the age of twelve. She left Réunion at the age of 17, and studied in Toulouse, France, at the Lycée Pierre-de-Fermat from 2002 to 2005, and subsequently at Paris 1 Panthéon-Sorbonne University in 2005 and finally at École pratique des hautes études. In 2009 she started as a teacher of history and geography in Île-de-France. Back in Réunion, she continued to work as a teacher of Latin, history and geography, first in middle school and later in high school. She also taught in a detention center and functions as an associate judge in a juvenile court.

== Writing career ==
In 2020 Belem published her first novel Un monstre est là, derrière la porte (translated into English as There's a Monster Behind the Door). The novel is set in the 1980s on Réunion Island and is a humorous account of a young girl growing up in a poor and dysfunctional family in Saint-Benoît. The novel was awarded the 2020 Grand prix du roman métis as well as the André-Dubreuil prize of the Société des gens de lettres for a first novel and was among the finalists for the Prix des cinq continents de la francophonie that year. An English translation by Karen Fleetwood and Laëtitia Saint-Louber, There's a Monster Behind the Door, was published in 2024. It was longlisted for the International Booker Prize in 2025. It won the 2025 Republic of Consciousness Prize, the judges calling it "a compact, comic tour-de-force".

In 2023, Bélem published her second novel, Le fruit le plus rare ou la vie d'Edmond Albius. An English translation by Karen Fleetwood and Laëtitia Saint-Louber, The Rarest Fruit: The Life of Edmond Albius, was published in 2025. Edmond Albius was a horticulturist who developed an innovatory technique that revolutionized the cultivation of vanilla, making it possible to profitably grow the source plant, Vanilla planifolia, beyond its native habitat in Latin America. The novel is both a biography of Albius and an adventure novel. The novel won the Prix du roman métis des Étudiants 2025. In 2025, The New York Times named it as one of the 100 notable books of the year.

In 2025, Bélem released Sud Sauvage, a collection of fantastic stories set in La Réunion that pay tribute to her role models: Guy de Maupassant, Edgar Allan Poe and H. P. Lovecraft. The official launch took place on April 4 at the Médiathèque de Saint-Denis, with text readings in the presence of author Philippe Morvan, set to music by the harpist Séverine Ledoux.

== Works ==
=== Original publication in French ===
- Bélem, Gaëlle (2022). Un monstre est là, derrière la porte. Collection Folio. Histoire, 7031 (in French). Paris: Gallimard. ISBN 9782072963575. OCLC 1306268362.
- Bélem, Gaëlle (2023). Le fruit le plus rare: ou la vie d'Edmond Albius. Continents noirs (in French). Paris: Gallimard. ISBN 9782073029898. OCLC 1395542660.
- Bélem, Gaëlle (2025). Sud Sauvage. Continents noirs (in French). Paris: Gallimard. ISBN 9782073113603.

=== Translation in English ===
- Bélem, Gaëlle (2024). There's a Monster Behind the Door. Translated by Fleetwood, Karen; Saint-Louber, Laëtitia (paperback ed.). Bullaun Press. ISBN 9781739842369.
- Bélem, Gaëlle (2025). The Rarest Fruit. Translated by Fleetwood, Karen; Saint-Louber, Laëtitia (hardcover ed.). Europa Editions. ISBN 9798889660996.

== Awards ==
- Grand prix du roman métis 2020 and debut novel Prix André Dubreuil du premier roman 2020 of the Société des gens de lettres for Un monstre est là, derrière la porte.
- Republic of Consciousness Prize 2025 for There's a Monster Behind the Door.
- Prix du roman métis des Étudiants 2025 pour Le fruit le plus rare ou la vie d'Edmond Albius.

== See also ==
- Literature of Réunion
- Postcolonial literature
