= Christopher Wise =

American scholar (born 1961)

Christopher Wise (born 1961) is a cultural theorist, literary critic, scholar, and translator. His publications largely focus on Sahelian West Africa, especially Mali, Burkina Faso, and Senegal, as well as Palestine, Jordan, and Israel. He has also published theoretical works on Fredric Jameson, Jacques Derrida, and Noam Chomsky.

== Early life and career ==
Wise was born in Oklahoma and is a member of the Muscogee (Creek) Nation. He received his Ph.D. in Comparative Literature from the University of California, Riverside in 1992.

He taught on Fulbright awards at the Université de Ouagadougou in Burkina Faso (1996–97) and the University of Jordan, Amman (2001-2003). At the University of Jordan, Wise developed American and Islamic Studies programs. In 2004, he co-directed the first American Studies Conference in the Middle East, held in Cairo, Egypt.

He taught on the faculty of the University of West Georgia and Occidental College. Wise has been a professor at Western Washington University since 1996.

== African scholarship and translation ==
In 1997, Wise traveled to Mopti-Sevaré in Central Mali, where he met the reclusive novelist and marabout, Yambo Ouologuem. Wise's interview was the only interview granted by Ouologuem after the time that he went into seclusion in the mid 1970s until his death in 2017. In the interview, Ouologuem revealed that he was a fierce critic of Arab neo-imperialism in West Africa. Wise's widely discussed interview was published in ‘’Research In African Literatures’’ and later reprinted as a book in both English and French. Wise later translated Ouologuem’s works into English in his book, The Yambo Ouologuem Reader. Wise’s works on Ouologuem have contributed towards a reconsideration of Ouologuem’s writings at a time that he had been discredited due to plagiarism controversies. In 2001, Wise edited a collection of writings by Sahelian writers entitled The Desert Shore that included political essays by the slain Burkinabe journalist Norbert Zongo. Obed Nkunzimana called The Desert Shore “A substantial scholarly, humanistic, and ethnical contribution to the understanding of Africa in general and the Sahel in particular.” Wise also translated Zongo's The Parachute Drop into English in 2004, a novel about a corrupt West African dictator which was based on figures like Mobutu Sese Seko and Blaise Compaore. Ngugi wa Thiong’o later endorsed the book, stating, “In this novel, with its clear and readable English translation, Zongo's spirit rises from the dead to tell the oppressor: I will never stop to fight for a more humane Africa.” Wise's work on Zongo's murder brought international attention to Compaore's use of assassination to eliminate his enemies. Wise later translated Al Hajj Mahmud Kati's Timbuktu chronicle the Tarikh al fattash into English, a 16th-century Songhay Dynasty manuscript. Nubia Kai called Wise’s translation “an occasion for celebration,” and she attributed the long neglect of Kati's book to institutional racism. Wise's translation of the Tarikh al fattashhas been praised for its readable prose, and it remains one of Africa World Press's best-selling books.

== Cultural theory writings and literary criticism ==
Wise's works in literary criticism have focused on African, Middle Eastern, and Native American authors, including Chinua Achebe, Ngugi wa Thiong’o, Frantz Fanon, V. S. Naipaul, Mary Crow Dog, and others. In his early theoretical writings, Wise identified himself as “Marxian” and wrote his Ph.D. dissertation on Fredric Jameson. Wise's later theoretical works have focused on deconstruction, especially the Franco-Algerian theorist, Jacques Derrida. In 2001, Wise published a controversial essay on Derrida in the journal ‘’Diacritics’’ entitled 'Deconstruction and Zionism: Jacques Derrida’s Specters of Marx.' In this essay, Wise rejected Derrida's universalizing term “messianicity” which he saw as historically specific to Judaic articulations of messianism, as well as Derrida's sympathetic views about Zionism in Israel. Although Wise criticized Derrida's Zionism, he also argued that Derrida's orientation to theory as a Sephardic Jew from Northwest Africa rendered his work particularly useful for African studies. In ‘’Derrida, Africa, and the Middle East,’’ Wise built upon Derrida’s deconstruction of Hellenic concepts of the word, and the Senegalese philosopher Cheikh Anta Diop’s writings about ancient Egyptian influence in the Sahel, suggesting that heka, the Egyptian word for “word,” is probably the historical antecedent of the Hebraic term ruah, the Mande term nyama, and the Songhay term naxamala. Regarding this book, Nigerian critic Abiola Irele stated, “Apart from its careful dissection of Derrida’s work in all its scope, Derrida, Africa, and the Middle East represents a major contribution to the on-going debate of the relations between peoples.” The Kenyan critic Emilia Ileva similarly stated, “Wise has succeeded in making deconstruction far more inclusive than the articulation of it one finds in Derrida’s writings. Derrida’s work may now begin to resonate more clearly in Africa and in African Studies in particular.” Thirteen years after his essay on Derrida and Zionism appeared, Wise published a follow-up essay in Gianni Vattimo and Michael Marder's ‘’Deconstructing Zionism,’’ which included contributions from Slavoj Zizek, Judith Butler, Luce Irigaray, and others. Vattimo and Marder’s volume was harshly criticized as “anti-semitic” by Cary Nelson, Gabriel Brahm Noah, and others. Others defended the volume and Wise's contribution to it. Around this time, Wise wrote a theoretical book entitled ‘’Chomsky and Deconstruction,’’ which responded to Noam Chomsky’s attacks on poststructuralist theorists like Derrida, Michel Foucault, Jacques Lacan, Julia Kristeva and others. Although Wise’s book on Chomsky largely concentrated on Chomsky’s linguistics, he later extended his critique to include Chomsky’s political views of U.S. foreign policy in ‘’Sorcery, Totem, and Jihad in African Philosophy,’’ (Bloomsbury, 2017). The anthropologist Paul Stoller called Wise’s application of Derrida to the Sahel in this book “brilliant,” and the Ajami scholar Fallou Ngom similarly called Wise's book “a major contribution to West African Studies.” Wise's book has nevertheless been criticized in its comparison of Israeli Zionism with the Wahhabi jihadist invasion of Northern Mali in 2012.

== Selected works: translations and authored ==
- The Yambo Ouologuem Reader: The Duty of Violence, A Black Ghostwriter’s Letter to France, & The Thousand and One Bibles of Sex. Edited & Translated by Christopher Wise. Trenton, New Jersey & Asmara, Eritrea: Africa World Press, 2008
- The Marxian Hermeneutics of Fredric Jameson, 1995
- Yambo Ouologuem: Postcolonial Writer, Islamic Militant, 1999 (editor)
- The Desert Shore: Literatures of the Sahel, 2001 (editor)
- The Parachute Drop, by Norbert Zongo. Translated by Christopher Wise. Trenton, New Jersey & Asmara, Eritrea: Africa World Press, 2004
- Derrida, Africa, and the Middle East, 2009
- Chomsky and Deconstruction: The Politics of Unconscious Knowledge, 2011
- Taʾrīkh al Fattāsh: The Timbuktu Chronicles 1493–1599, 2011 (editor and translator)
- In Search of Yambo Ouologuem. Vlaeberg, South Africa: Chimurenga Books, “Best of Chimurenga,” Series 2, Book 5, 2011.
- Sorcery, Totem, and Jihad in African Philosophy, “Suspensions: Contemporary Middle Eastern and Islamicate Thought,” New York: Bloomsbury Publishing, 2017.

== Articles ==
- "A Conversation With Mary Brave Bird," with R. Todd Wise, American Indian QuarterlyVol. 24, No. 3 (Summer 2000): 482-493.
- “Deconstruction, Zionism, and the BDS Movement,” Arena Journal, Issue No. 47/48 (2017): 272-304.
- "Nyama and Heka: African Concepts of the Word," Comparative Literature Studies, Vol. 43, No. 1-2 (2006): 17-36.
- The Killing of Norbert Zongo,” Perspectives on African Literatures at the Millennium, Ed. by Arthur Drayton & Peter Ukpokodu. Trenton, New Jersey: Africa World Press, 2006: 252-260.
- “Deconstruction and Zionism: Jacques Derrida’s Specters of Marx” Diacritics, Vol. 31, No. 1 (Spring) 2001: 56-72.
- “The Spirit of Zionism: Derrida, Ruah, and the Purloined Birth Right,” Deconstructing Zionism: A Critique of Metaphysical Politics, Edited by Gianni Vattimo & Michael Marder. New York: Continuum Press, 2013: 113-131.
- “Après Azawad: Le devoir de violence, djihad, et l’idéologie chérifienne dans le Nord du Mali,” Traduit par Ninon Chavez. Fabula / Les colloques: L’oeuvre deYambo Ouologuem, Un carrefour d’écritures (1968-2018), L’Université de Lausanne et L’Université de Strasbourg. Ed. Christine Le Quellec Cottier & Anthony Mangeon.
