= Akli Tadjer =

French-Algerian writer (born 1954)

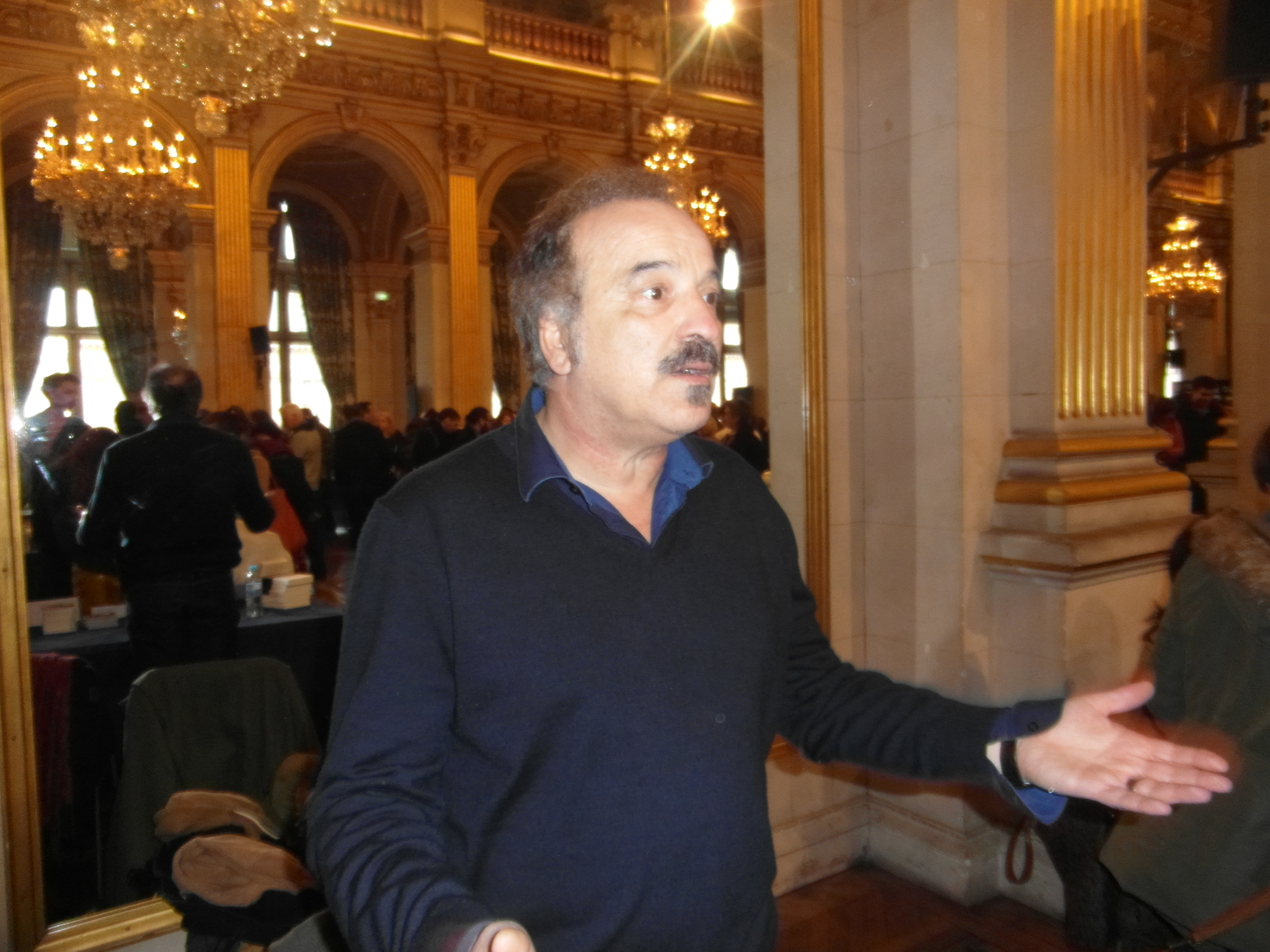
- Born: August 11, 1954 (age 70); Paris, France
- Occupation: Writer
- Language: French
- Notable awards: Bay of Angels Award: The Tango Queen, 2016; Morocco Award: Bag holder, 2002

Akli Tadjer (Arabic:آكلي تاجر), a Franco-Algerian writer, was born on August 11, 1954, in Paris, of Algerian immigrant parents. His first novel, Al-Tassili, was published in 1985, for which he won the Georges Brassens Prize for Literary Creativity.

== Biography ==
Akli Tadjer was nicknamed "a writer by chance" as he started writing by chance after his father wanted him to be a protection or policeman. He joined the world of fiction through the entrance of French newspapers and magazines. Then he became a teacher of literature in Paris schools. Tadjer began writing for the French newspaper Le Monde in the 1980s until he became one of the popular readers. What distinguishes his writings is the global dimension that is derived from reality. He held many positions as a teacher at the École Normale Supérieure de Journalism (Higher School of Journalism) in Paris and as editor of many newspapers and magazines. Critics consider him to be a rising writer at the international Francophone level.

== Al-Tassili ==
The complexities of Algérianité (French-Algerian identity) is a common theme of Algerian literature. Al-Tassili opens with Tadjer's protagonist Omar returning to France, a symbolic representation of a return "home" to France from the "home" in Algeria. This is given a humorous twist when Omar jokes that his previous attempt at the "voluntary adaptation training course" (French: stage d'adaptation volontaire) had lasted only fifteen days, he says: "Algeria I blame you for not being able to hold on to me. I came with the secret ambition of successfully passing this voluntary adaption phase".

== Works ==
Some of his works include the followings:

- Al-Tassili (original title: Les A.NI. du Tassili), 1985 (won Georges Brassens Prize for Creativity)
- Courage and Patience (original title: Courage et patience), 2000
- The Bag Holder (original title: Le Porteur de cartable), 2002
- Alphonse, 2005
- Beautiful Memories (original title: Bel-Avenir), 2006
- One Day, 2008
- The Western, 2009
- The Best Way to Love (original title: La Meilleure Façon de s'aimer), (2012)

== Awards ==
- He won the Bay of Angels Award in 2016 for his novel The Tango Queen.
- He won Morocco Award for his book The Bag Holder in 2002.
