= In Koli Jean Bofane =

Congolese writer

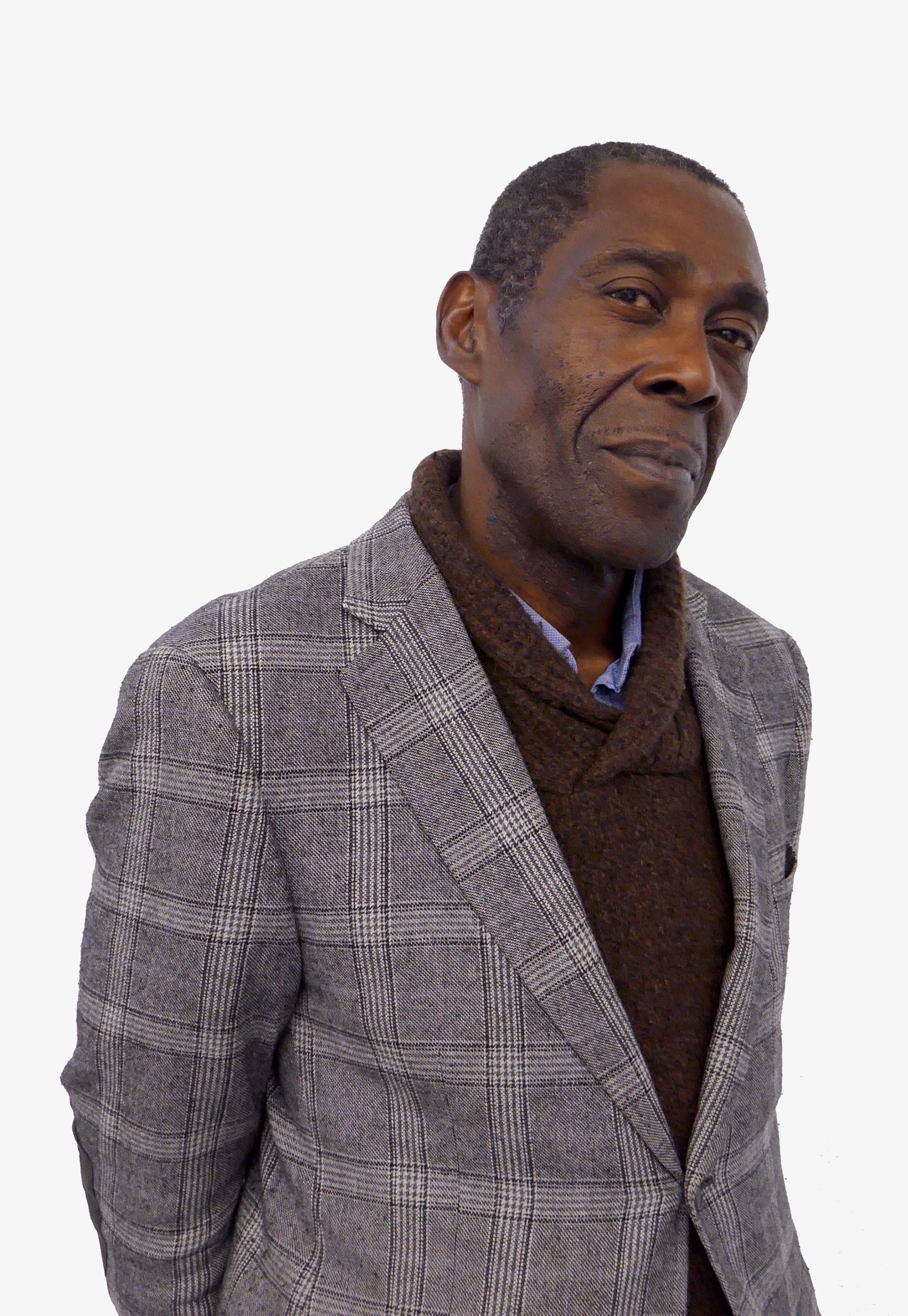
- Born: 24 October 1954 (age 71); Mbandaka, Belgian Congo
- Occupation: Novelist
- Writing career
- Language: French
- Period: 1996–present
- Notable awards: Grand prix littéraire d'Afrique noire (2009); Prix des cinq continents de la francophonie (2015)

In Koli Jean Bofane (born 24 October 1954 in Mbandaka in what is now the Democratic Republic of the Congo) is a Congolese writer.

== Life and work ==
Bofane was born in Équateur province in 1954; his mother left his father for a Belgian settler and he grew up mainly on his stepfather's coffee plantation. After independence in 1960, they lost everything and had to leave the country for their safety, travelling to Belgium from where Bofane made constant return trips to the Congo as he grew up. He established himself in Kinshasa where he worked in advertising and founded a publishing company, Les Publications de l'Exocet.

He finally left the country permanently in 1993, settling in Brussels. His first book, a children's story published in 1996, won a major Belgian literary prize and he went to win acclaim with his first novel, Mathematiques Congolaises in 2008.

== Bibliography ==
- Pourquoi le lion n'est plus le roi des animaux, Gallimard, 1996
- Bibi et les Canards, 2000
- Mathématiques congolaises, Actes Sud, 2008
- Congo Inc. : Le testament de Bismarck, Actes Sud, 2014, Grand prix du roman métis
- Nation cannibale, Denoël, 2025
