= Moncef Ouahibi =

Tunisian poet (born 1949)

- محمد المنصف الوهايبي
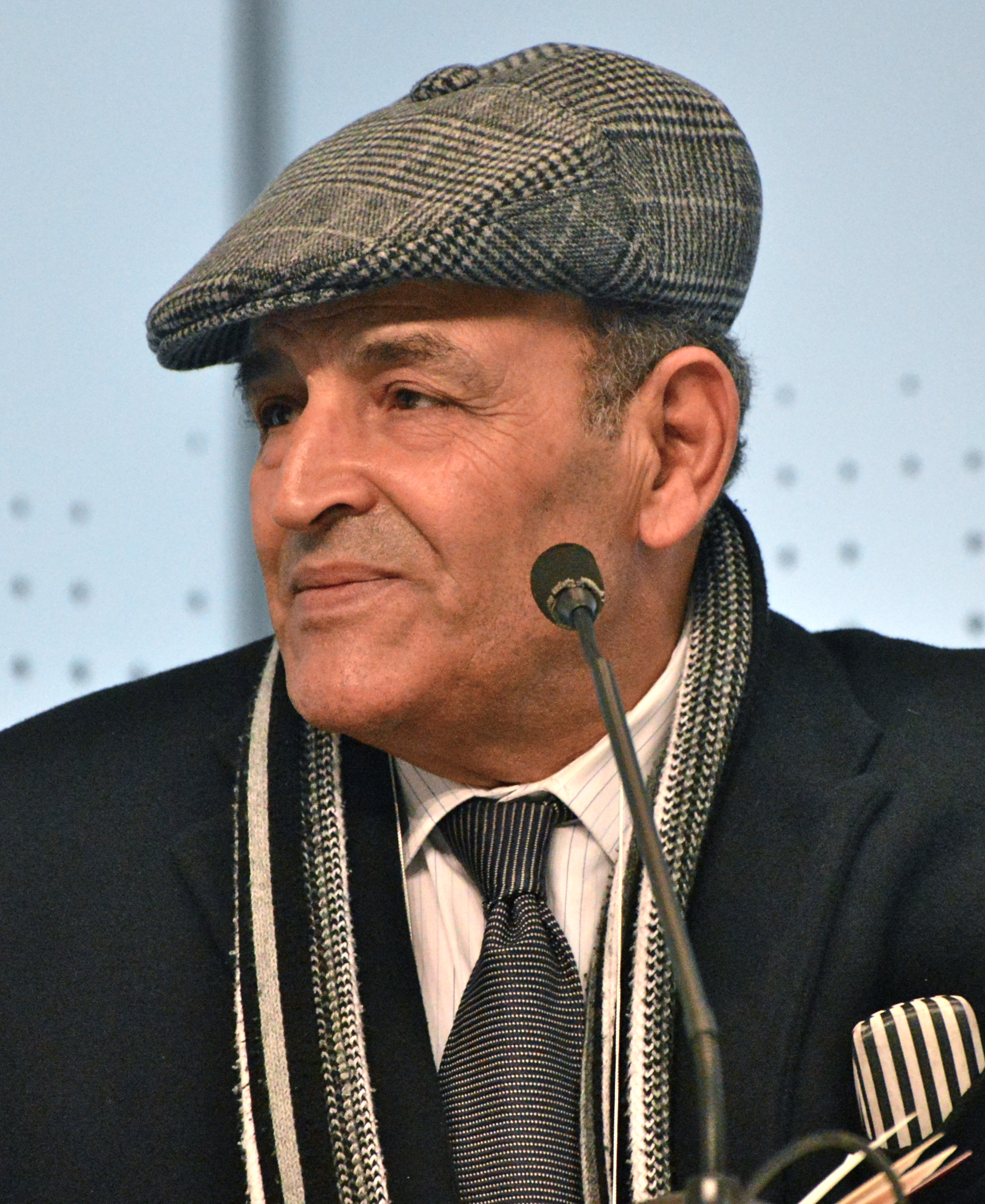
- Ouhaïbi in 2017
- Born: Mohammed Moncef Ouahibi; 20 December 1949 (age 75); Hajeb El Ayoun, Kairouan Governorate, Tunisia
- Occupation: Poet • Writer • Academic
- Awards: (2020) Sheikh Zayed Book Award (2014) Babtain Poetry Prize (2012) COMAR d'Or

Muhammad Al-Moncef Al-Wahaibi (born 20 December 1949 Hajib el-Ayounin, Tunisia) is a Tunisian poet, writer and academic.

== Education and Academic Career ==
Muhammad Al-Moncef Al-Wahaibi was born in Hajeb El-Ayoun in the Kairouan governorate of Tunisia. He obtained his master's degree with the thesis "The visible body and the imagined body in the poetry of Adonis;" his PhD thesis at the Manouba University was on "The poetry industry of Abu Tammam and its components: in reading ancient and poetic text." He works as a lecturer at the Faculty of Arts and Humanities at the University of Kairouan and University of Sousse, Tunisia. He is a member of the Tunisian Academy of Sciences, Literature and Arts - Beit Al-Hikma.

== Writing ==
In 1996, Ouahibi wrote and wrote the script for the fictional documentary "Oh A Country Like Me," directed by Hisham Al-Jarbi, which centers around the 1914 visit of painter Paul Klee to Tunis, Hammamet and Kairouan. He co-wrote the film “Waiting for Ibn Rushd” for the same director in 1998.

He has also worked translating poetry into Arabic. In 1984, he translated, with Muhammad al-Ghazzi, the collection of Under the Aquarius by the Swedish Nobel Committee member, Uston Shustrand. He also worked with the Portuguese poet Rosa Alice Branco to translate her poem "What Is Missing Green to Be a Tree" in 2002 and in the publication of "The Palm of Kairouan" in Arabic and Portuguese in 2003.

Selected poems from his collections have been translated into French, English, German, Spanish, Portuguese and Swedish. He has several articles on the Alawan website and works as director of the "Ataba Cultural" association in Porto, Portugal.

== Prizes ==
- Aboul-Qacem Echebbi Prize for Poetry, 1999
- COMAR d'Or Prize, 2012
- 'Akaaz Poetry Prize, 2014
- The Foundation of Abdulaziz Saud Al-Babtain's Prize for Poetic Creativity, 2014
- Sheikh Zayed Book Award, 2020
