= Pablo Strauss =

Canadian literary translator

Pablo Strauss (born 1977) is a Canadian literary translator, originally from Victoria, British Columbia, and currently based in Quebec City, Quebec. He is most noted as a three-time Governor General's Award nominee for French to English Translation, receiving nods at the 2017 Governor General's Awards for The Longest Year (Daniel Grenier, L'année la plus longue), the 2019 Governor General's Awards for Synapses (Simon Brousseau), and the 2020 Governor General's Awards for The Country Will Bring Us No Peace (Matthieu Simard, Ici, ailleurs).

The Dishwasher, his translation of Stéphane Larue's Le Plongeur, won the Amazon.ca First Novel Award in 2020. What I Know About You, his translation of Éric Chacour's Ce que je sais de toi, was a shortlisted finalist for the 2024 Giller Prize.
