= Algérianité =

Algérianité was the conception of a unique "Algerianess" under French colonial rule in Algeria that encompassed an independence from the French identity, and the political ideal of an Algerian homeland. Algérianité conceives of Algerian identity as a unique blend of disparate influences contributed by settlers of differing cultural backgrounds. The blending of such diverse influences creates the new culture that is uniquely Algerian and this is called "Algérianité".

== Literary works ==
This has been the topic of several literary works exploring the relationship of diasporas to Algeria and their shared connection to collective cultural forms.

Algerian author Assia Djebar explored similar themes in her first fiction novel La Soif (1957). Her work centers on the Algerian cause to reclaim a national identity as independent from the contested and coexisting complex identities, some of which predate French rule in Algeria. La Soif was published during the Algerian War. According to Algerian sociology Fanny Colonna, Djebar, Kateb Yacine, Mouloud Mammeri and Mohammed Dib and other Algerian authors viewed Algerian patrimony as shared, "a truly Algerian patrimony common to francophones, berberphones and arabophones", emphasizing the shared experiences common to the Mediterranean region.

Nabile Farès – author of Un passager de l'Occident (1971) and Le Champs des oliviers. Découverte du monde (1972) – was influenced by the views of American author James Baldwin on multiculturalism. Baldwin viewed the United States as inherently multicultural, which helped shaped Farès' views about post-colonial Algeria. Farès believed that modernization in Algeria would not be possible without the acceptance of Algérianité in the paradigm of a New World that was formed of multiple nations and subject to none.
