= Fawzia Zouari =

Tunisian writer and journalist

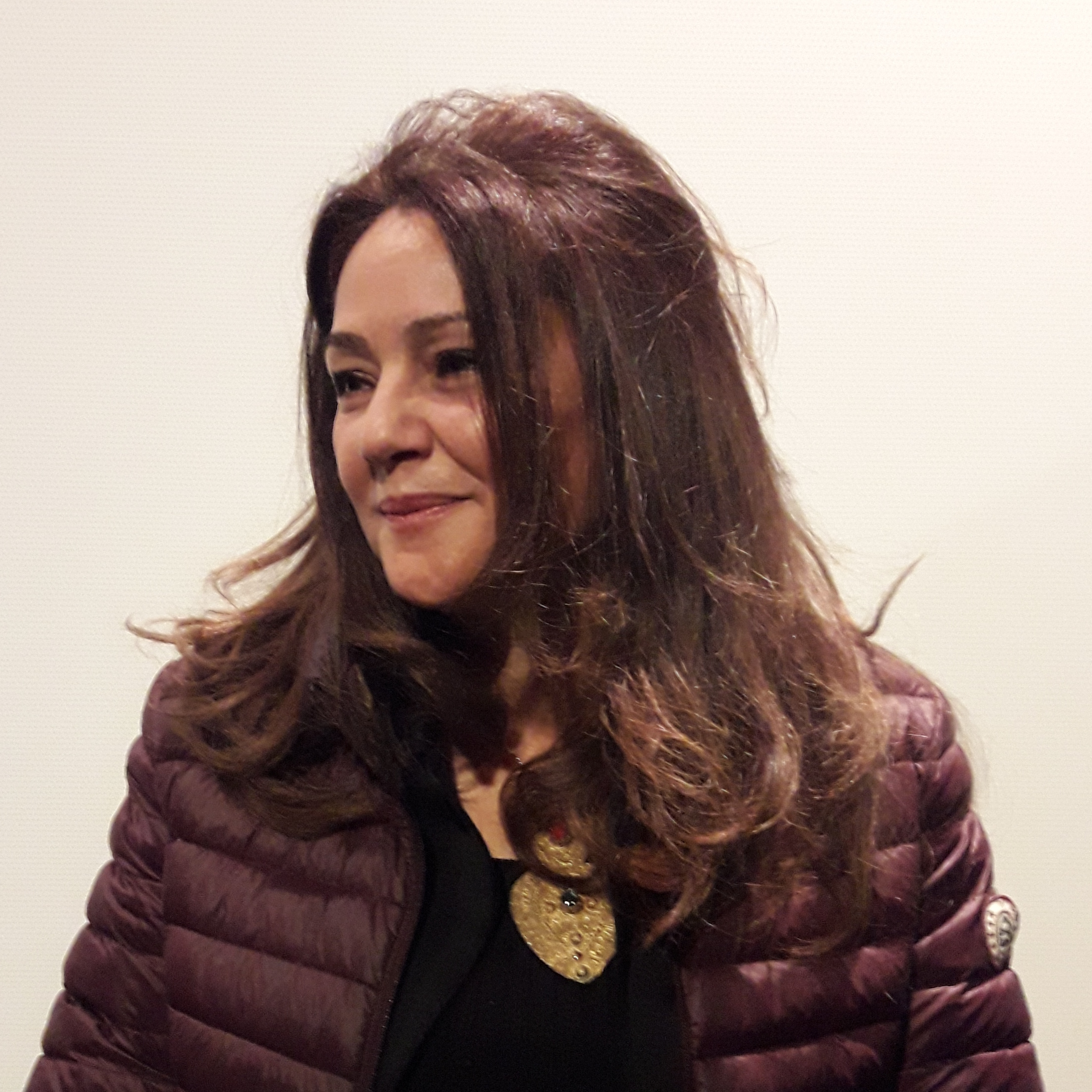
- Fawzia Zouari
- Born: 10 September 1955 (age 70); Dahmani, Tunisia
- Education: University of Paris
- Occupations: Journalist, Novelist
- Writing career
- Language: French
- Notable awards: Prix des cinq continents de la francophonie (2016)

Fawzia Zouari (Arabic: فوزية الزواري), born 10 September 1955 in Dahmani, is a Tunisian writer and journalist.

== Biography ==
She was born in Dahmani, about 30 kilometers south-east of Kef, south-west of Tunis, one of six sisters and four brothers. Her father is a sheikh, landowner and justice of the peace. She is the first of the girls not to be married during adolescent and to be able to carry out tertiary studies. She continued her studies at the faculty of Tunis [Laquelle?], Then in Paris.

A doctor in French literature from the Sorbonne, Zouari has lived in Paris since 1979. She worked for ten years at the Institut du monde arabe in various positions including editor of the magazine Qantara – before becoming a journalist for the weekly magazine Jeune Africa in 1963.

The Caravan of the chimeras, published in 1989 and which takes up the subject of her thesis, is devoted to the journey of Valentine de Saint-Point, grand-niece of Alphonse de Lamartine, a muse of Futurism, who wanted to reconcile the Orient and the West, and settled in Cairo after converting to Islam Her most recent works refer to the Maghrebian woman settled in Western Europe. This country of which I am dying, published in 1999 and inspired by a news story, tells a fictionalized story of the lives of two Algerian worker daughters, uprooted as uncomfortably in their societies of origin as in their new country La Retournée, a novel published in 2002, narrates in an ironic tone the life of a Tunisian intellectual living in France who could no longer return to his native village. It imbricates in this narrative Arabic-Berber terms, with no exact semantic equivalent in French. This book was reprinted in a pocket edition in 2006. The same year, The Second Wife appeared, featuring three Maghrebi women frequented simultaneously by the same man, and again inspired by a news item.

== Awards ==
Zouari received the Prix des cinq continents de la francophonie for her work Le Corps de ma mère on December 6, 2016. She had already received special mention from this organization in 2003 for her novel La Retournée. She also received the Comar d'or, the top literary prize in Tunisia, in 2007 for her novel La Deuxième épouse.

== Works ==
- La Caravane des chimères, Paris, Éditions de l'Olivier Orban, 1998. (ISBN 978-2855655710)
- Ce Pays dont je meurs, Paris, Ramsay, 1999. (ISBN 978-2841144563)
- La Retournée, Paris, Ramsay, 2002. (ISBN 978-2841145461)
- Le Corps de ma mère, Clamecy, Éditions Joëlle Losfeld, 2016. (ISBN 978-2072765278)
- Le Voile Islamique, Paris, Éditions Favre, 2002. (ISBN 978-2-8289-0683-2)
- Pour en finir avec Shahrazad, Paris, Édisud, 2003. (ISBN 978-9973-19-292-9)

== Bibliography ==
Jean Dejeux, La Littérature féminine de langue française au Maghreb, Paris, Éditions Karthala, 1994, « L'appel de l'Orient », p. 169-170.

Philippe Douroux, «Fawzia Zouari, dévoilée », Libération, 28 décembre 2015. (ISSN 0335-1793)
