= Edmond Albius =

Réunion horticulturalist (1829–1880)

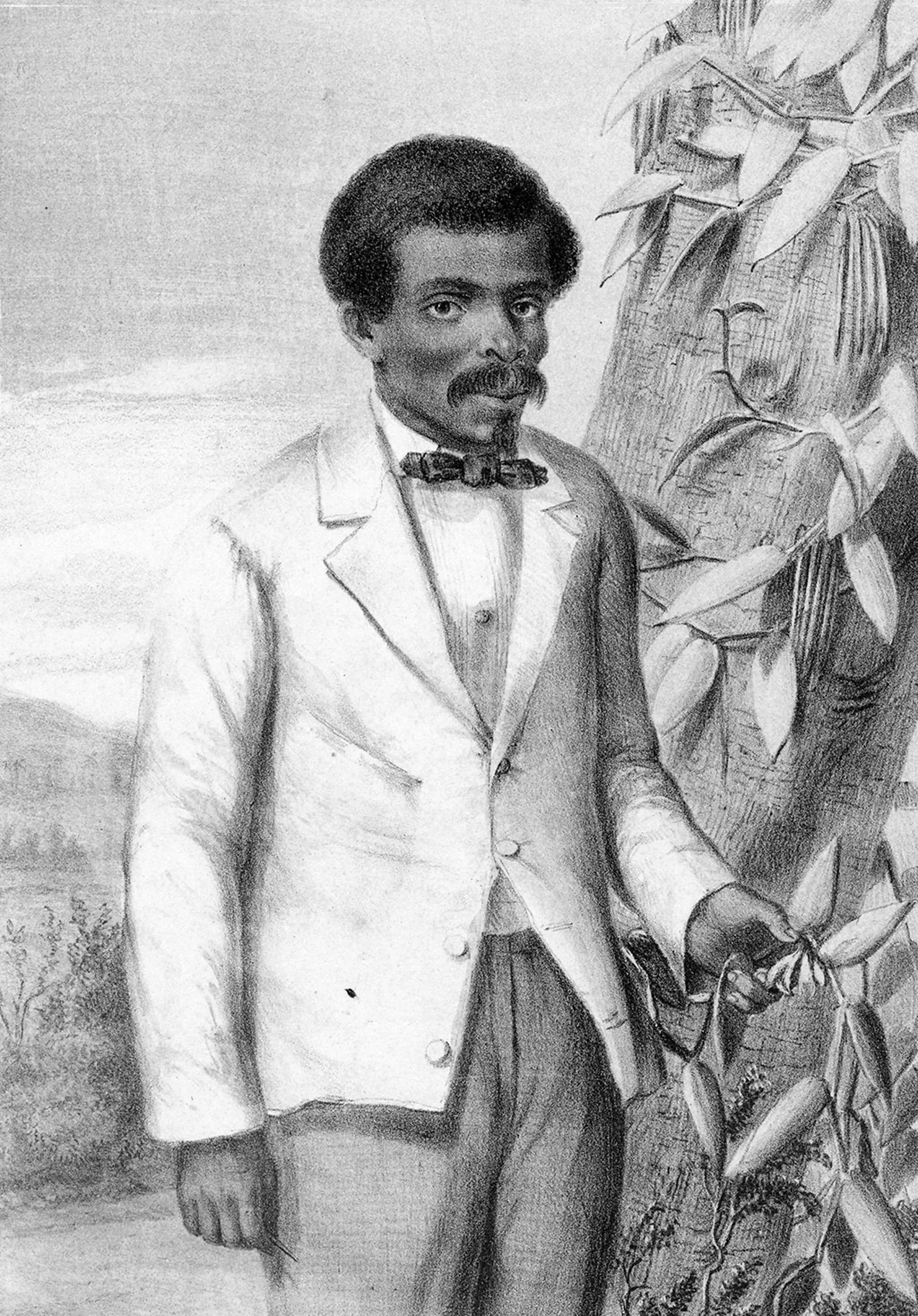
- c. 1863 portrait of Albius
- Born: c. 1829; Sainte-Suzanne, Réunion
- Died: 9 August 1880 (aged 50–51); Sainte-Suzanne, Réunion
- Occupation: Horticulturist
- Known for: Inventing vanilla pollination technique

Edmond Albius (c. 1829 – 9 August 1880) was a horticulturalist from Réunion. Born into slavery, Albius became an important figure in the cultivation of vanilla. At the age of 12, he invented a technique for pollinating vanilla orchids quickly and profitably. Albius's technique revolutionized the cultivation of vanilla and made it possible to profitably grow Vanilla planifolia away from its native habitat (Mexico to Brazil).

== Early life ==
Albius was born in St. Suzanne, Réunion. His mother, an enslaved woman, died during his birth. The colonist keeping Edmond in slavery was Féréol Bellier Beaumont.

== Vanilla pollination ==
French colonists brought vanilla seeds to Réunion and nearby Mauritius in the 1820s with the hope of starting production there. However, the plant didn't develop any fruits (seed pods) because of the absence of the pollinating insect outside of the plant's natural range. In 1837, Charles Morren, a professor of botany at the University of Liège in Belgium, published a method of hand-pollination, but his technique was slow and required too much effort to make cultivating vanilla a moneymaking proposition.

Albius's owner, Mr. Beaumont, taught him the basics of botany, including how to fertilize flowers. In 1841, Albius invented a method to quickly pollinate the vanilla orchid using a thin stick or blade of grass and a simple thumb gesture. Using the stick or grass blade, field hands lift the rostellum, the flap that separates the male anther from the female stigma, and then, with their thumbs, smear the sticky pollen from the anther over the stigma.

Albius's manual pollination method is still used today, as nearly all vanilla is pollinated by hand. After Albius's discovery, Réunion became for a time the world's largest supplier of vanilla. French colonists used Albius's technique in Madagascar to cultivate vanilla, and Madagascar remains the world's chief vanilla producer.

Noted French botanist and plant collector Jean Michel Claude Richard claimed to have discovered the technique three or four years earlier but this has been debunked.

== Later life ==
In gratitude for – and in recognition of – his discovery, locals on Réunion attempted (unsuccessfully) to obtain a reward or a government stipend for Albius.

In 1848, France outlawed slavery in its colonies, and Albius left the plantation for St. Denis, where he worked as a kitchen servant. He adopted Albius as his new surname from alba "white" in reference to the vanilla orchid's colour.

He was convicted of stealing jewelry and sentenced to ten years in prison, but the sentence was commuted after five years when the governor granted him clemency in light of his enormous contribution to vanilla production in Réunion.

Albius died in poverty in St. Suzanne in 1880.

== In the media ==
Albius' story is explored in "The Enslaved Teen Who Cracked Vanilla's Secret", an episode of Ideas on CBC Radio. Also in 2023, the French-Réunionese novelist Gaëlle Bélem published an award-winning historical novel Le fruit le plus rare: ou la vie d'Edmond Albius based on Albius's life. The story is also told on the BBC 'World's Table' in January 2024.
