= Brotherhood (novel) =

2014 novel by Mohamed Mbougar Sarr

- Title page in original French, Terre ceinte (2014)
- Author: Mohamed Mbougar Sarr
- Original title: Terre ceinte
- Translator: Alexia Trigo
- Language: French
- Subject: Political
- Genre: Literary fiction
- Set in: Kalep, Sumal fictional town
- Publisher: Présence Africaine
- Publication date: 2014
- Publication place: Senegal
- English publication date: 6 October 2021
- Media type: Print; Digital
- Pages: 248 (trade paper)
- Awards: Grand prix du roman métis; Prix Ahmadou-Kourouma
- ISBN: 978-2-7087-0881-5 (trade paper)
- LC Class: PQ3989.3.M36714 T47 2014

Brotherhood (French: Terre ceinte) is a political novel by Senegalese writer Mohamed Mbougar Sarr, originally published in French as Terre Ceinte in 2014 by Présence Africaine. An English translation by Alexia Trigo was published by Europa Editions in 2021.

The novel takes place in a fictional town in Africa, where Islamic extremism has taken root.

== Background ==
In 2014, Mohamed Mbougar Sarr's novel was published by Présence Africaine in French. It was Sarr's debut novel and second work after his critically acclaimed short story "La Cale". In 2021, it was translated by Alexia Trigo, making it Trigo's debut work as a translator and Sarr's first novel to be translated into English.

== Plot ==
The story follows an extremist Islamic organisation called the Brotherhood, which has taken control of the fictional town of Kalep, and a group of decentralised intellectuals intent on challenging its extreme religious doctrine. The antagonist, Abdel Karim, is a police chief who leads the Brotherhood. In order to fight the tyrant, the intellectuals develop a political journal called Rambaaj that is aimed at reawakening the people and calling for an uprising. To fight back, Karim places a huge bounty on the underground journalists, which leads to betrayal and backstabbing within the organisation. In order to winnow out the journalists, Karim burns down a library that is considered cultural property.

== Characters ==
- Abdel Karim — a police chief and leader of the Brotherhood
- Malamine — leader of the resistance group
- Ndey Joor Camara — Chef, mother of Idrissa, Ismaila, and Rokhaya

== Reception ==
It received a starred review from Publishers Weekly. PW described it as a "vital new voice to American readers." It was listed in Brittle Paper's Notable Books of 2021.

== Awards and nominations ==
The original French-language novel won the Grand prix du roman métis and Prix Ahmadou-Kourouma in 2015.
