= Beata Umubyeyi Mairesse =

Rwandan-French writer

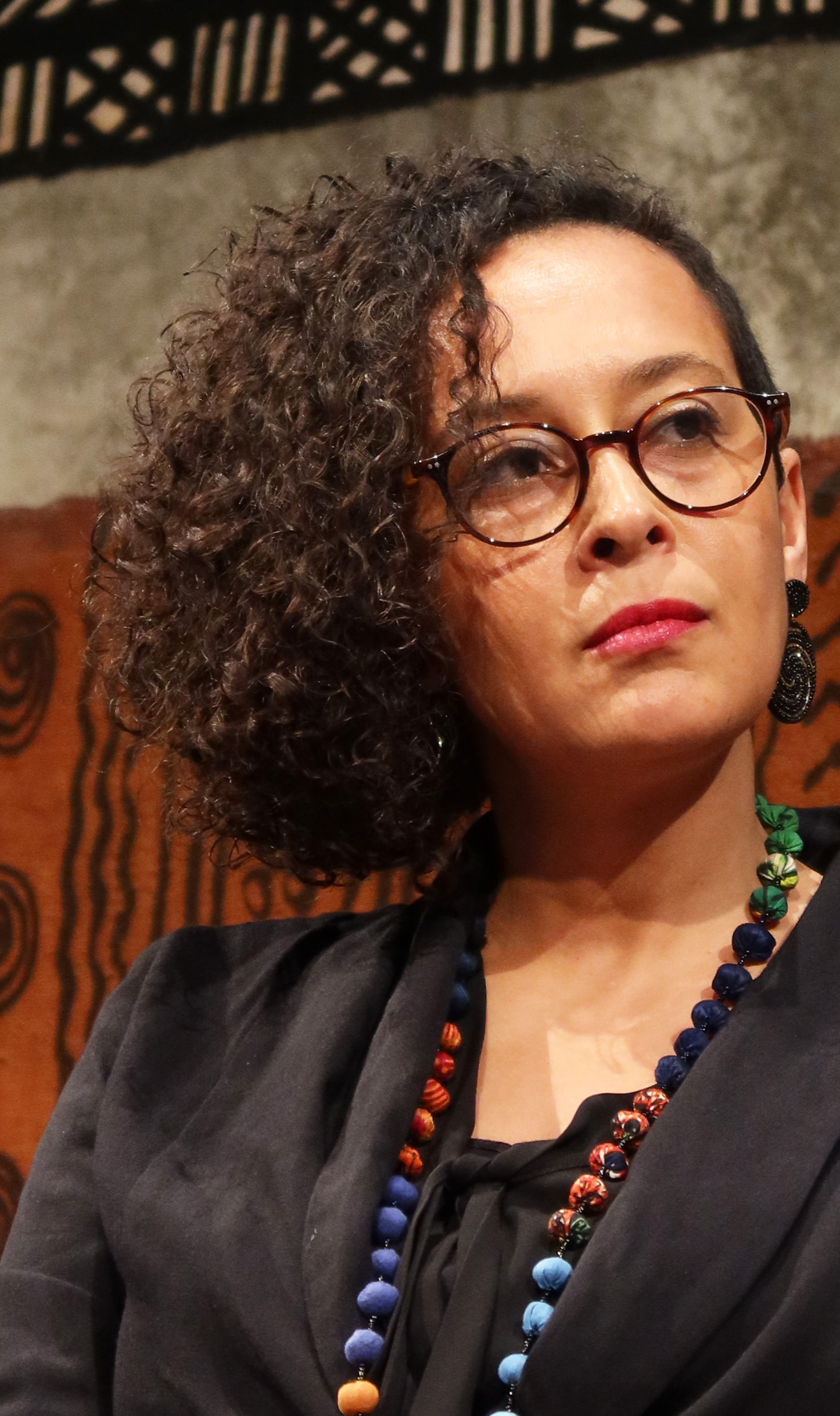
- Beata Umubyeyi Mairesse at the Atlantide festival in Nantes, 2024
- Born: 1979 (age 46–47); Butare, Rwanda
- Citizenship: Rwandan, French
- Occupations: writer, novelist, poet

Beata Umubyeyi Mairesse (born 1979, in Butare) is a French-Rwandan writer and a survivor of the Rwandan genocide. She is the author of three books, and several collections of short stories and poetry. Her writing has received a number of literary prizes in France and abroad.

== Biography ==
=== Early life ===
Beata Umubyeyi Mairesse was born and raised in Butare, Rwanda. Her father was Polish and her mother is Rwandan. As a child, she attended an international school in Butare, where she learned to speak French fluently. During the 1994 genocide, 15-year-old Beata saved herself and her Tutsi mother from armed Hutu militiaman by pretending to be French. The pair fled the country by hiding in a Terre des hommes children's convoy. Umubyeyi Mairesse would later be placed with a foster family in the north of France. After high school, she studied literature and political science at the Sorbonne University, where she graduated with a degree in humanitarian action and development. She then worked for international aid organisations and in the health sector. Since 2007 she has lived in Bordeaux, France.

=== Writing career ===
In 2015, Umubyeyi Mairesse made her debut as a writer with a collection of short stories called Ejo, a word that means both 'yesterday' and 'tomorrow' in Kinyarwanda, her mother-tongue. The stories are set before and after the genocide and are told from the perspective of women. In 2017, she published a second collection of short stories, Lézardes.

In 2019, she released Après le progrès, a collection of poems. That year, Umubyeyi Mairesse published her debut novel, Tous tes enfants dispersés. The novel tells the story of a family torn apart by genocide and exile. It deals with themes such as motherhood, the role of women as bearers of culture, the transmission of tradition and culture between generations, racism and cultural identity. Tous tes enfants dispersés was well received by French critics and awarded several literary prizes, including the 2020 Prix des cinq continents de la francophonie. The English version, All your children, scattered received praise from the Financial Times and The Guardian.

Umubyeyi Mairesse published her second novel, Consolée, in 2022. Consolée tells the story of a mixed-race woman who was taken from her Rwandan mother as a child to be raised by white nuns then sent for adoption in Belgium. The story is based on true events of mixed-race children raised at the Institut pour enfants mulâtres de Save during Belgian colonial rule. The novel was awarded the Prix Kourouma at the 2023 Geneva Book Fair.

In 2024, Umubyeyi Mairesse published the autobiographical Le convoi, which depicted her escape from Rwanda during the 1994 genocide. In the book, she recounts how she tracked down the children from the convoy she fled with, the BBC team which filmed the convoy, and the aid workers who saved her life. She mixes autobiography and essay, linking her work with other writers who survived genocides, such as Primo Levi and Imre Kertész. Le convoi received praise from by French critics, and was named one of the best books of 2024 by Télérama and Les Inrockuptibles. The book went on to win a number of prominent literary awards, including the Prix Essai France Télévisions and the Grand prix de l'héroïne Madame Figaro. It was also finalist for the Prix du Livre Inter 2024. Ruth Diver was the 2025 laureate of the Scott Moncrieff Prize for her translation of The Convoy into English.

In the same year, her poetry collection Culbuter le malheur was published by the French-Canadian publisher Mémoire d'encrier.

Beata Umubyeyi Mairesse gave the opening speech at the 24th Berlin International Literature Festival 2024.

In September 2026, her second narrative nonfiction book, La solidarité des ébranlés, was published in the Camera Obscura series by Editions Julliard. Based on a photograph of Nelson Mandela with the South African activist Zackie Achmat taken by Eric Miller, she recounts the struggle for access to antiretroviral therapy in Africa in the early 2000s, and reflects on her personal commitment to the fight against AIDS, which began with an internship at Act Up-Paris in 2002.

== Bibliography ==
=== Short stories collections ===
- Ejo, La Cheminante, 2015
  - Portuguese translation (Brazilian): Ejo e outros contos, Periferias editora, 2021, translated by Déborah Spatz
  - Czech translation: Ejo, Volvox Globator, 2017, translated by Tomáš Kybal
- Lézardes, La Cheminante, 2017
- Ejo suivi de Lézardes et autres nouvelles, Autrement, 2020

=== Novels ===
- Tous tes enfants dispersés, Autrement, France, 2019; paperback, J'ai lu, 2021.
  - English translation: All your children, scattered, Europa editions, 2022 (US), 2023 (UK), translated by Alison Anderson
  - Italian translation: I tuoi figli ovunque dispersi, edizioni e/o, 2022, translated by Alberto Bracci Testasecca
  - Romanian translation: Toti copiii tai risipiti, Casa Cartii de Stiinta, 2021, translated by Andrei Lazar.
  - Swedish translation: Alla dina skingrade barn, Ordfront förlag, 2024, translated by Nils Wadström
- Consolée, Autrement, 2022; paperback, J'ai lu, 2024

=== Poetry ===
- Après le progrès, La Cheminante, 2019
- Culbuter le malheur, Mémoire d'encrier, 2024

=== Non-fiction ===
- Le convoi, Flammarion, 2024; paperback, J'ai lu, 2025
  - English translation: The convoy, Open Borders Press, Orenda Books, 2025, translated by Ruth Diver
- La solidarité des ébranlés, Julliard, 2026

=== Children's books ===
- Peau d'épice, Gallimard Jeunesse, 2023

== Awards and honours ==
- 2016 : Prix François Augiéras for Ejo
- 2017: Prix du livre Ailleurs for Ejo
- 2019: Prix La Boétie for Lézardes
- 2020 : Prix des cinq continents de la francophonie for Tous tes enfants dispersés
- 2020 : Prix Des racines et des mots for Tous tes enfants dispersés
- 2020 : Prix Éthiophile for Tous tes enfants dispersés
- 2021: Richelieu Prize for Tous tes enfants dispersés
- 2023: Kourouma Prize for Consolée
- 2023: Prix Livres en boîte for Consolée
- 2024: Prix Essai France Télévisions for Le convoi
- 2024 : Grand prix de l'héroïne Madame Figaro for Le convoi
- 2024 : Special Prize Montluc Résistance et Liberté for Le convoi
- 2024 : Reader's Prix du Roman Métis for Le convoi
- 2024 : Prix Fetkann! Maryse Condé for Le convoi
- 2025: Franz Hessel Prize for Le convoi
