= Amel Mokhtar =

Tunisian journalist and novelist

- آمال مختار
- Occupation: Novelist • Journalist • Writer

Amel Mokhtar (Arabic: آمال مختار, romanized: ʾĀmāl Mukhtār; born February 4, 1964) is a Tunisian journalist and novelist. She has won several prizes, including the COMAR Special Prize in 2006 for her novel Māystrū (Maestro).

== Biography ==
Mokhtar was born in the town of Maktar in the Siliana Governorate, Tunisia. She completed a bachelor's degree in Natural Science at the University of Tunis and began a career in journalism in 1985.

Mokhtar published many short stories in Tunisian newspapers and Arab literary magazines. She published her first novel, Nakhab al-hāyat, in 1993 with Dar al-Adab in Beirut; she was the first Tunisian woman to publish with this prestigious press. She then published a short story collection entitled La taʿshiqī hādha al-rajul and her novel al-Kursī al-hazzāz in 2003. She has won several prizes such as the Tunisian ministry of culture's prize for literary innovation in 1994 and the COMAR Special Prize (for "remarkable originality in a novel") for her novel Māystrū in 2006.

== Works ==
=== Novels ===
- (1993) Nakhab al-hāyat (نخب الحياة (Toasts to life))
- (2003) al-Kursī al-hazzāz (الكرسي الهزاز (The rocking chair))
- (2007) Māystrū (مايسترو (Maestro))
- (2013) Dukhan al-qasr (دخان القصر (Smoke of the palace))

=== Short story collections ===
- (2003) La taʿshiqī hādha al-rajul (لا تعشقي هذا الرجل (Don't love this man))
- (2004) li-al-Mārid wajha jamīl (للمارد وجه جميل (The monster has a pretty face))
- (2015) Ḥafal al-ʾashbāḥ (حفل الاشباح (Party of ghosts))

== Awards and honours ==
- (1988) Taher Hedad prize for short stories
- (1994) Ministry of Culture prize for creative literature (for her novel Toast to Life)
- (2006) COMAR Special Prize for Tunisian Novel (for Maestro)
- (2015) CTAM'ART Prize (2nd Place) for Culture and Creativity (for Party of ghosts)
