= Emna Belhadj Yahia =

Tunisian writer

Emna Belhadj Yahia or Emna Belhaj Yahia (Arabic: آمنة بلحاج يحي) was born on September 30, 1945, in Tunis. She is a Tunisian teacher, philosopher and writer in French.

== Biography ==
Born on September 30, 1945, in Tunis, from a family of theologians by her mother as well as from a family of wealthy traders by her father. She studied Philosophy in France, then obtained a diploma of high studies in Philosophy at the faculty of Letters in Paris. She enrolled as PhD student at "l'École pratique des hautes études", with Jacques Berque, but she did not finish this course. The events of May '68 took place simultaneously at her university trip.

Afterwards, she taught Philosophy a few years in Tunisia, before being the scientific director at the Tunisian Academy of Sciences, Letters and Arts. She was also a member of a feminist group, and later of the Tunisian League for Human Rights, before devoting herself to writing. After the Tunisian Revolution of 2011, and the years that followed, the rise of conservative religious parties and the questioning by these parties of certain freedoms acquired by women, she decided to formalize her thoughts as well as critics in her book "Tunisie, questions à mon pays" (Tunisia, questions to my country) in 2014.

== Publications ==
- Chronique frontalière (Border criticism), Paris, Blandin, 1991
- L’Étage invisible (The Invisible Floor), Paris, Joëlle Losfeld, 1996
- Tasharej, Paris, Balland, 2000
- Une fenêtre qui s'ouvre (A window that opens), dans Leïla Sebbar, Emna Belhadj Yahia, Rajae Benchemsi, Maïssa Bey et Cécile Oumhani, Tunis, Elyzad, 2007, p. 25–43
- Rouge à lèvres et brioche au chocolat (Lipstick and chocolate cake), dans Sophie Bessis et Leïla Sebbar, Tunis, Elyzad, 2010, p. 55–66
- Jeux de rubans (Ribbons games), Tunis, Elyzad, 2011 2012 Comar Golden Award
- Tunisie, questions à mon pays (Tunisia, questions to my country), Paris, Éditions de l'Aube, 2014
