= Prix des cinq continents de la francophonie =

The flag of the Organisation internationale de la francophonie.

The Prix des cinq continents de la francophonie (literally "Prize of the five continents of the francophonie") is a literary prize created in 2001 by the Organisation internationale de la francophonie.

== Winners ==
| Year | Author | Title | Publisher (x times) | Special award |
|---|---|---|---|---|
| 2001 | Yasmine Khlat | Le désespoir est un péché | éditions du Seuil | Ahmed Abdodemane for La ceinture, éditions Gallimard |
| 2002 | | | | |
| 2003 | Marc Durin-Valois | Chamelle | éditions JC Lattès | Fawzia Zouari for La Retournée, éd. Ramsay |
| 2004 | Mathias Énard | La Perfection du tir | éditions Actes Sud | Seyhmus Dagtekin for À la source, la nuit, éditions Robert Laffont |
| 2005 | Alain Mabanckou | Verre Cassé | éditions du Seuil | |
| 2006 | Ananda Devi | Eve de ses décombres éditions Gallimard | | Pierre Yergeau for La Cité des vents, éditions 400 coups |
| 2007 | Wilfried N'Sondé | Le Cœur des enfants léopards | éditions Actes Sud | |
| 2008 | Hubert Haddad | Palestine | éditions Zulma | |
| 2009 | Kossi Efoui | Solo d'un revenant | éditions du Seuil | |
| 2010 | Liliana Lazar | Terre des affranchis | éditions Gaïa | |
| 2011 | Jocelyne Saucier | Il pleuvait des oiseaux | éditions XYZ | Patrice Nganang for Mont Plaisant, éditions Philippe Rey |
| 2012 | Geneviève Damas | Si tu passes la rivière | éditions Luce Wilquin | Naomi Fontaine for Kuessipan, éditions Mémoire d'encrier |
| 2013 | Amal Sewtohul | Made in Mauritius | éditions Gallimard | Claude Pujade-Renaud for Dans l'ombre de la lumière, éditions Actes Sud |
| 2014 | Kamel Daoud | Meursault, contre-enquête | éditions Barzakh / Actes Sud | |
| 2015 | In Koli Jean Bofane | Congo Inc. le testament de Bismarck | éditions Actes Sud | Miguel Bonnefoy for Le voyage d'Octavio, éditions Rivages |
| 2016 | Fawzia Zouari | Le Corps de ma mère | éditions Joëlle Losfeld/Demeter | |
| 2017 | Yamen Manai | L'Amas ardent | éditions Elyzad | |
| 2018 | Jean Marc Turine | La Théo des fleuves | Éditions Esperluète | Stéfanie Clermont for Le jeu de la musique, Le Quartanier |
| 2019 | Gilles Jobidon | Le Tranquille affligé | éditions Leméac | Alexandre Feraga for Après la mer, Flammarion |
| 2020 | Beata Umubyeyi Mairesse | Tous tes enfants dispersés | Autrement | Paul Kawczak for Ténèbre, éditions La Peuplade |
| 2021 | Karim Kattan | Le Palais des deux collines | éditions Elyzad | Miguel Bonnefoy for Héritage, éditions Rivages |
| 2022 | Monique Proulx | Enlève la nuit | Éditions du Boréal | Yahia Belaskri for Le silence des dieux, éditions Zulma |
| 2023 | Éric Chacour | Ce que je sais de toi | Éditions Philippe Rey | Khalid Lyamlahy for Évocation d'un mémorial à Venise, Présence africaine |
