= Éric Chacour =

Canadian writer

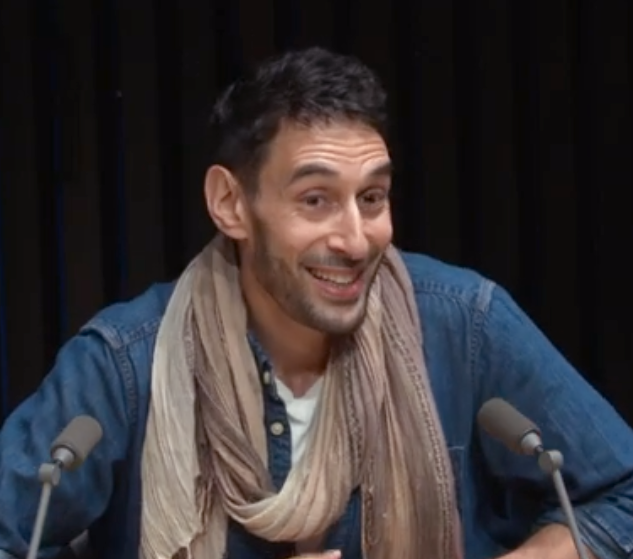
- In a 2025 interview
- Born: November 5, 1983 (age 43); Montreal, Quebec, Canada

Éric Chacour (born November 5, 1983) is a Canadian writer from Quebec, whose debut novel Ce que je sais de toi was published in 2023.

== Biography ==
Born in Montreal to immigrant parents from Egypt, he spent his childhood in both Quebec and France. He received a bachelor's degree from Paris Dauphine University and then a master's degree in applied economics and international relations from the Université de Montréal. He works in the financial sector.

He began writing Ce que je sais de toi about ten years before it was finally published in 2023. The novel won the Prix Femina des lycéens in 2023 and the Prix des cinq continents de la francophonie in 2024, and was shortlisted for the Prix littéraire des collégiens in 2024. It was also awarded the Prix des libraires and the Prix France-Québec in 2024.

What I Know About You, an English translation by Pablo Strauss of Ce que je sais de toi, was published in 2024 by Coach House Books in Canada and Gallic Books in the United Kingdom. It was shortlisted for several literary awards including the Giller Prize, the Dayne Ogilvie Prize, and the Atwood Gibson Writers' Trust Fiction Prize. In 2026, the novel was shortlisted for the Dublin Literary Award.

The novel has been translated into 15 languages. In 2026, both the English and French versions in the ebook and audiobook formats were selected for the One eRead Canada, making unlimited copies available from participating libraries for the month of April.
