= Kaouther Adimi =

Algerian writer

- au Livre sur la place, Nancy, en 2025.
- Born: 1986; Algiers
- Alma mater: University of Algiers 1
- Occupation: Writer, novelist, short story writer
- Works: Our Wealth,
- Awards: Prix du jeune écrivain de langue française (2006); Prix littéraire de la vocation (2011); Prix Renaudot des lycéens (Our Wealth, 2017); (Our Wealth, 2017); resident at the Villa Medici (2021)

Kaouther Adimi (born 1986) is a writer, graduate in modern literature and human resources management. She works today in Paris, where she has lived since 2009.

== Life ==
Kaouther Adimi was born in Algiers, Algeria, in 1986. From the age of four to the age of eight, she lived with her family in Grenoble, France. During this period, she discovered the pleasure of reading, by going to the public library every week with her dad.

In 1994, she returned to Algeria, which was then under the influence of terrorism. Having very few opportunities to read, she started to write her own stories.

While she was studying in the Algiers University, she entered a writing contest organized by the French Institute, for the young writers in Muret (Haute-Garonne). The short story she submitted held the attention of the jury who published it in a collection alongside the other laureates' productions. Thanks to this contest, she was invited to Muret, then Toulouse, and finally Paris, where she met with les éditions Barzakh.

She has a degree in modern literature and human resources management.

In 2009, she wrote her first novel L'envers des autres. The same year, she left Algiers for Paris.

== Works ==
- Le Chuchotement des anges, her first short story, published in the collection of short stories Ne rien faire et autres nouvelles, editions Buchet/Chastel, march 2007
- L'Envers des autres Arles, France] : Actes sud, 2011. ISBN 9782742797257, OCLC 725889694
- Des pierres dans ma poche, Paris: Éditions du Seuil, DL 2016. ISBN 9782021302691, OCLC 948029133
- Le Sixième Œuf, nouvelle sombre, in Alger, la nuit, éditions Barzakh, 2011
- Nos richesses, éditions du Seuil, 2017. ISBN 9782363604507, OCLC 1023611160 Translated by Chris Andrews as Our Riches (New Directions, 2020).
- Les petits de Décembre, éditions du Seuil, 2019. ISBN 9782021430806
- Au vent mauvais, roman, éditions du Seuil, 2022. ISBN 978-2-0215-0356-2

== Awards and honours ==
- 2011, Prix littéraire de la Vocation, for L'Envers des Autres
- 2015, Prix du roman de la fondation France-Algérie
- 2008, Prix du FELIV (Festival international de la littérature et du livre de jeunesse d’Alger)
- 2008, Prix du jeune écrivain de langue française, for Pied de vierge
- 2017, Prix Renaudot des lycéens for Nos richesses
- 2017, Prix du Style for Nos richesses
- 2018, Prix Beur FM Méditerranée for Nos richesses
- 2018, Choix Goncourt de l'Italie 2018 for Nos richesses.
- 2018, Special mention Prix littéraire Giuseppe Primoli for Nos richesses.
- 2020, Prix du roman métis des lycéens for Les Petits de décembre
