= The Most Secret Memory of Men =

2021 novel by Mohamed Mbougar Sarr

- First edition cover
- Author: Mohamed Mbougar Sarr
- Original title: La plus secrète mémoire des hommes
- Translator: Lara Vergnaud
- Language: French
- Publisher: Éditions Philippe Rey; Éditions Jimsaan
- Publication date: 19 August 2021
- Publication place: Paris; Dakar
- English publication date: 26 September 2023
- Pages: 448
- Awards: Prix Goncourt (2021)
- ISBN: 978-2-84876-886-1
- OCLC: 1269504870

The Most Secret Memory of Men (French: La plus secrète mémoire des hommes, lit. 'The Most Secret Memory of Men') is a 2021 novel by Senegalese writer Mohamed Mbougar Sarr. It was co-published on 19 August 2021 by the French independent publisher Éditions Philippe Rey (Paris) with the Senegalese publishing house Éditions Jimsaan (Dakar).

An English translation by Lara Vergnaud was published by Other Press and Simon & Schuster Canada on 26 September 2023.

The novel received the Prix Goncourt on 3 November 2021, making Sarr the first Sub-Saharan African to win the prize.

== Synopsis ==
The novel tells the story of Diégane Latyr Faye, a young Senegalese writer living in Paris who discovers a 1938 novel by the fictional African author T.C. Elimane, nicknamed "the Black Rimbaud". The story mirrors the life of Malian writer Yambo Ouologuem, who won the Prix Renaudot in 1968, but was later accused of plagiarism, left France and disappeared from public life. The novel is primarily set in Senegal and Paris, but also moves to Amsterdam and Buenos Aires. It consists of three books that are interrupted by "biographèmes" (Roland Barthes).

== Reception ==
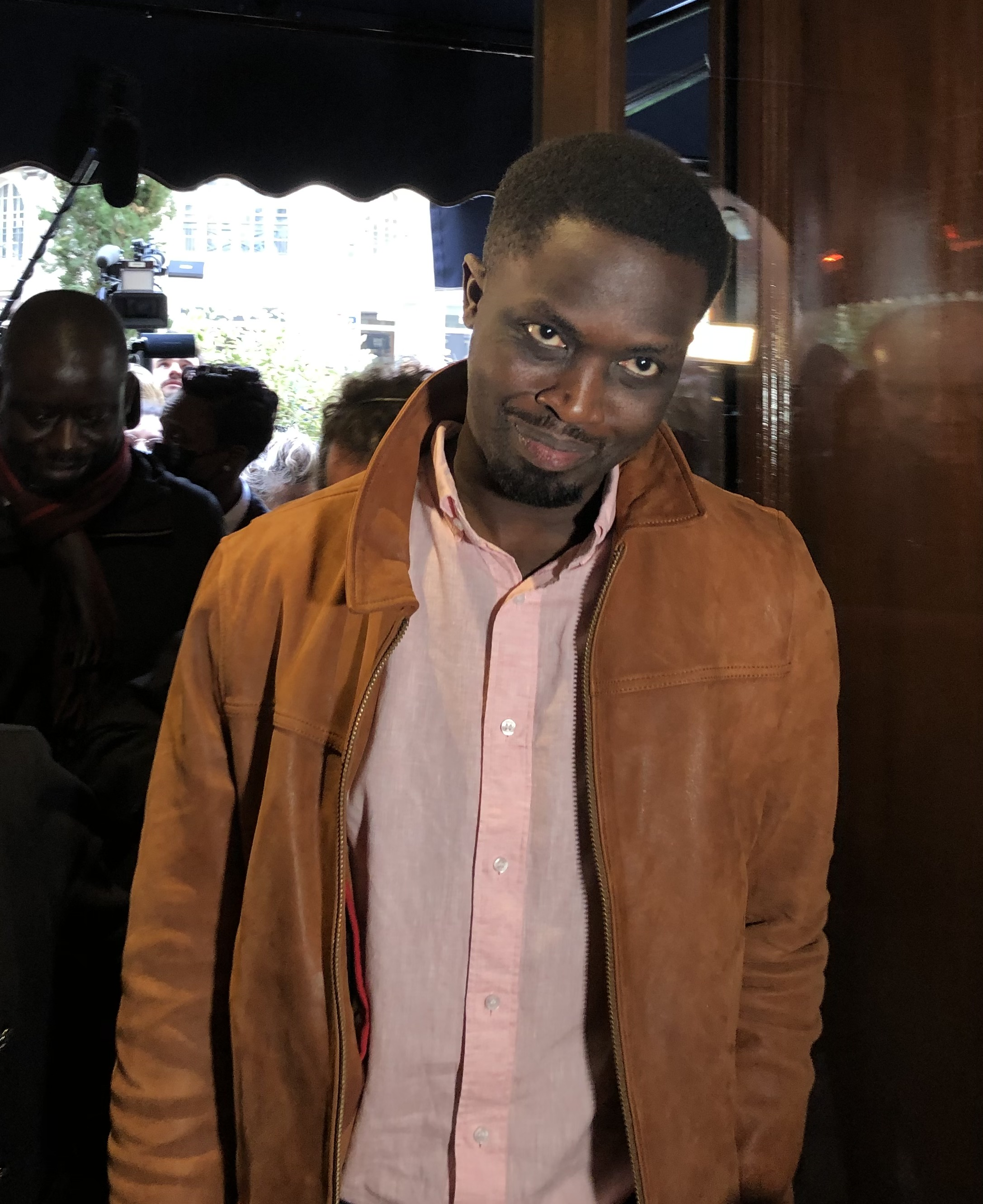
Sarr entering the Drouant restaurant in Paris to receive the Prix Goncourt on 3 November 2021

On 3 November 2021, the novel was awarded the Prix Goncourt. Sarr won in the first round of voting, by six votes against three votes for Sorj Chalandon's Enfant de salaud and one vote for Louis-Philippe Dalembert's Milwaukee Blues. Sarr is the first person from Sub-Saharan Africa to win the Prix Goncourt. At 31 years old, he is also the youngest Goncourt laureate since Patrick Grainville won in 1976.

Sarr's novel was also shortlisted for the Prix Femina and Prix Renaudot; and longlisted for the Prix Médicis L'Express magazine said the award declared "the revelation of the literary year", a "shining proof of the vitality and universality of the French language". Le Monde said the "impressive ambition and stunning energy" of Sarr's novel "carried all before it".

In September 2023, the English translation of the book was longlisted for the National Book Award for Translated Literature. The review in The New York Times described the novel as "a wildly expansive interrogation of everything from the nature of erotic love to the literary canon. We traverse the gamut of genres — the mystery, the ghost story, the philosophical novel, the historical novel, the magical realist tale — as Sarr navigates a spider's web that enmeshes fact and fiction, biography and gossip, authenticity and plagiarism, fame and infamy."
