= Tahar Bekri =

Tunisian poet

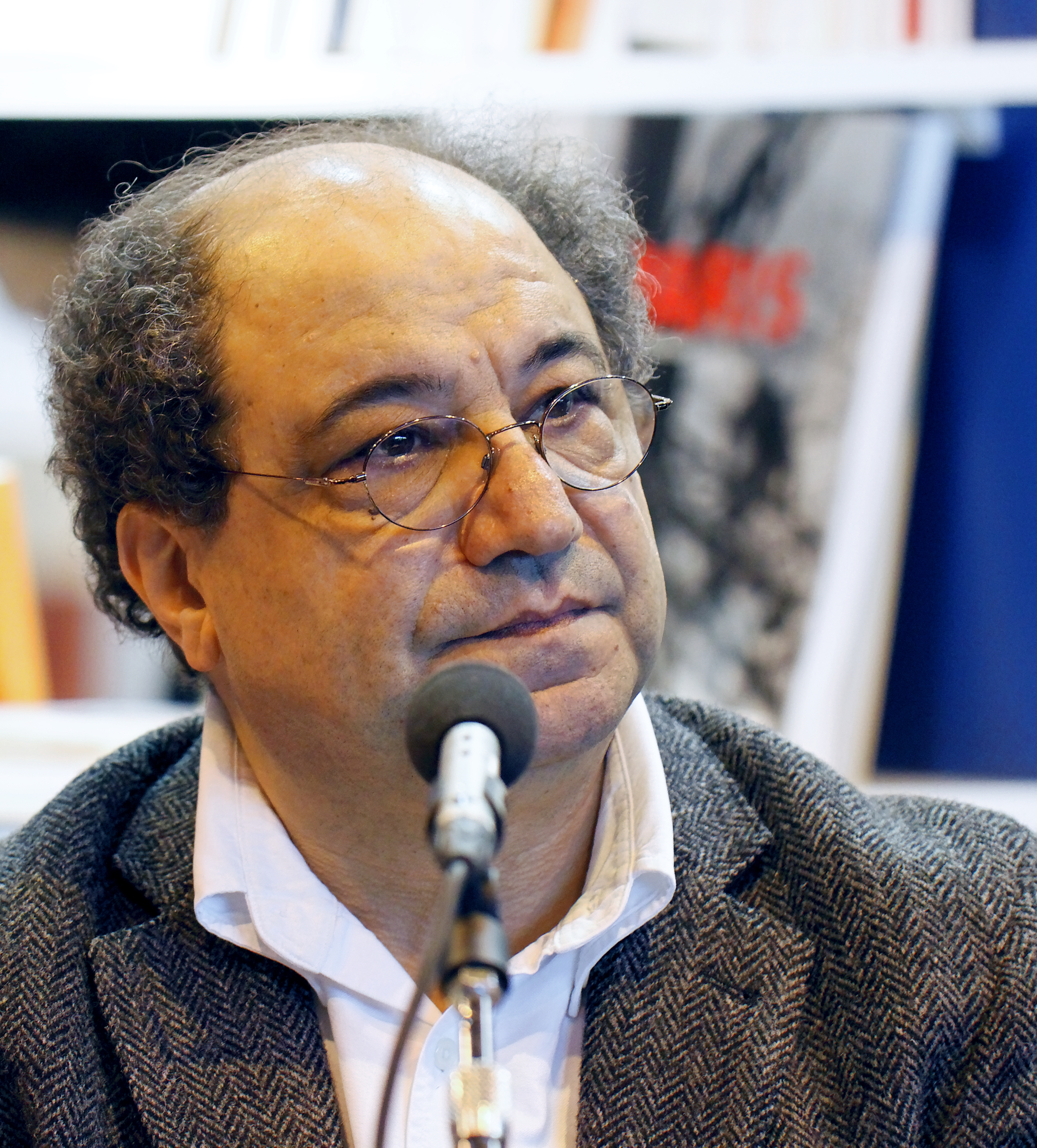
- Tahar Bekri in 2011
- Born: July 7, 1951 (age 74); Gabès, Tunisia
- Occupations: Poet, literary critic

Tahar Bekri (born 1951) is a Paris-based Tunisian poet and literary critic.

== Early life ==
Tahar Bekri was born on July 7, 1951, in Gabès, Tunisia.

== Career ==
Bekri has taught Literature of the Maghreb at Paris 13 University since 1985. He has published several books of literary criticism, including one about Algerian poet Malek Haddad. He defines Maghreb Literature as literary texts published by authors from Tunisia, Algeria and Morocco who use colloquialisms in French, Arabic and Berber.

Bekri has published poetry collections in French and in Arabic.

== Works ==
=== Poetry collections ===
- Bekri, Tahar (1983). Le laboureur du soleil; suivi de, Les grappes de la nuit : poèmes. Paris: Silex. ISBN 9782903871291. OCLC 11120676.
- Bekri, Tahar (1985). Le Chant du roi errant. Paris: L'Harmattan. OCLC 12854277.
- Bekri, Tahar (1988). Le cœur rompu aux océans : poèmes. Paris: L'Harmattan. ISBN 9782738400086. OCLC 20825117.
- Bekri, Tahar (1994). Les Chapelets d'attache. Paris: L'Harmattan. ISBN 9782738427212. OCLC 33869300.
- Bekri, Tahar (1996). Poèmes à Selma. Paris: L'Harmattan. ISBN 9782738442727. OCLC 463915716.
- Bekri, Tahar (1997). Mudhakkarat athalj wa'nnar. (Journal de neige et de feu). Tunis: L'Or du Temps. ISBN 9973757254.
- Bekri, Tahar (1997). Les Songes impatients. Montréal: L'Hexagone. ISBN 9782890065680. OCLC 36694788.
- Bekri, Tahar (2002). L'Horizon incendié. Neuilly-sur-Seine: Editions Al Manar. ISBN 9782913896154.
- Bekri, Tahar (2004). La Brûlante rumeur de la mer. Neuilly-sur-Seine: Editions Al Manar. ISBN 9782913896253. OCLC 56489351.
- Bekri, Tahar (2006). Si la musique doit mourir. Neuilly-sur-Seine: Editions Al Manar. ISBN 9782913896406. OCLC 70120609.
- Bekri, Tahar (2008). Les dits du fleuve. Neuilly-sur-Seine: Editions Al Manar. ISBN 9782913896673. OCLC 949263900.
- Bekri, Tahar (2011). Je te nomme Tunisie. Neuilly-sur-Seine: Editions Al Manar. ISBN 9782913896949. OCLC 754640563.
- Bekri, Tahar (2013). Au souvenir de Yunus Emre : poésie. Tunis: Éditions Elyzad. ISBN 9789973580481. OCLC 838461283.
- Bekri, Tahar, ed. (2013). Poésie de Palestine : anthologie. Neuilly-sur-Seine: Editions Al Manar. ISBN 9791090836198. OCLC 859439882.
- Bekri, Tahar (2014). La nostalgie des rosiers sauvages. Neuilly-sur-Seine: Editions Al Manar. ISBN 9791090836310. OCLC 892898066.
- Bekri, Tahar (2016). Mûrier triste dans le printemps arabe. Neuilly-sur-Seine: Editions Al Manar. ISBN 9782364260641. OCLC 949927137.

=== Non-fiction ===
- Bekri, Tahar (1986). Malek Haddad, l'œuvre romanesque : pour une poétique de la littérature maghrébine de langue française. Paris: L'Harmattan. ISBN 9782858026784. OCLC 15344579.
- Bekri, Tahar (1989). Littératures du Maghreb : bibliographie sélective. Paris: CLEF.
- Bekri, Tahar (1994). Littératures de Tunisie et du Maghreb : essais; suivi de, Réflexions et propos sur la poésie et la littérature. Paris: L'Harmattan. ISBN 9782738428165. OCLC 32926434.
- Bekri, Tahar (1999). De la littérature tunisienne et maghrébine, et autres textes : essais. Paris: L'Harmattan. ISBN 9782738484451. OCLC 43316863.
- Appert, Olivier; Bekri, Tahar (2000). Marcher sur l'oubli : entretiens avec Olivier Apert; suivi de poèmes et textes. Paris: L'Harmattan. ISBN 9782738491800. OCLC 55026730.
- Bekri, Tahar (2007). Le livre du souvenir : carnets. Tunis: Elyzad. ISBN 9789973580061. OCLC 132402655.
