= Nabile Farès =

Algerian writer

- Born: 25 September 1940; Collo, Algeria
- Died: 30 August 2016 (aged 75); Paris, France
- Occupation: Novelist
- Notable work: Un Passager de l'occident.
- Relatives: James Baldwin

Nabile Farès (25 September 1940 – 30 August 2016) was an Algerian-born French novelist. He was born in Collo, a part of Skikda Province, Algeria.

Farès left his studies and prepared (in the camps in Tunisia) to fight against the French towards the end of the war of independence (1960). Later he obtained his doctorate in France, with a dissertation on the role of the Ogre in North African oral literature.

His first work is the novel Yahia, pas de chance, (1970), which evolved from a manuscript Farès carried in a knapsack while on the run in several periods during and after the war of independence. Later works were both novels and poetry. Among these is the trilogy of novels La Découverte du nouveau monde and his greatest novel, Un Passager de l'occident, which arises, in part, from Farès's friendship with the American writer James Baldwin.

All of Farès's work is characterized by political engagement, and particularly by a drive to expand the definition of Algeria and Algerianness—and to resist factional politics and identity politics. He evokes an Algeria that is always a work in progress, and leaves the reader to reflect that personal identity (along with national) is much the same. Exile is a constant theme. His poetry, in particular, is challenging and marked by visually striking inventiveness. He died in Paris on 30 August 2016 at the age of 75.

== Works of Farès ==
- Yahia, pas de chance. Paris: le Seuil, 1970
- Le Champ d'Akli. Paris: P.J. Oswald, 1971
- Un Passager de l'occident. Paris: Le Seuil, 1971
- Le Champ des oliviers. Paris: Le Seuil, 1972
- Mémoire de l'absent. Paris: Le Seuil, 1974
- L'Exil et le désarroi. Paris: Maspero, 1976
- Chants d'histoire et de vie pour des roses de sable. Paris: L'Harmattan, 1978
- La Mort de Salah Baye. Paris: L'Harmattan, 1979
- L'Etat perdu. Paris: Actes/Sud, 1982
- L'Exil au féminin. Paris: L'Harmattan, 1987
- Hearing Your Story. New Orleans: U. New Orleans Press, 2008 (translation of Chants d'histoire et de vie pour des roses de sable)
- A Passenger From the West (novel). Translation by Peter Thompson. Diálogos Books, 2014
- Exile and helplessness (novel), translated by Peter Thompson, Diálogos Books, 2012
- Exile: Women's Turn (poems), translated by Peter Thompson, Diálogos Books, 2017
- Discovery of the New World (trilogy of novels; includes The Olive Grove, Memory and the Missing, Exile and Helplessness), translated by Peter Thompson, Diálogos Books, 2020
