= Nubia Kai =

American playwright, poet and novelist

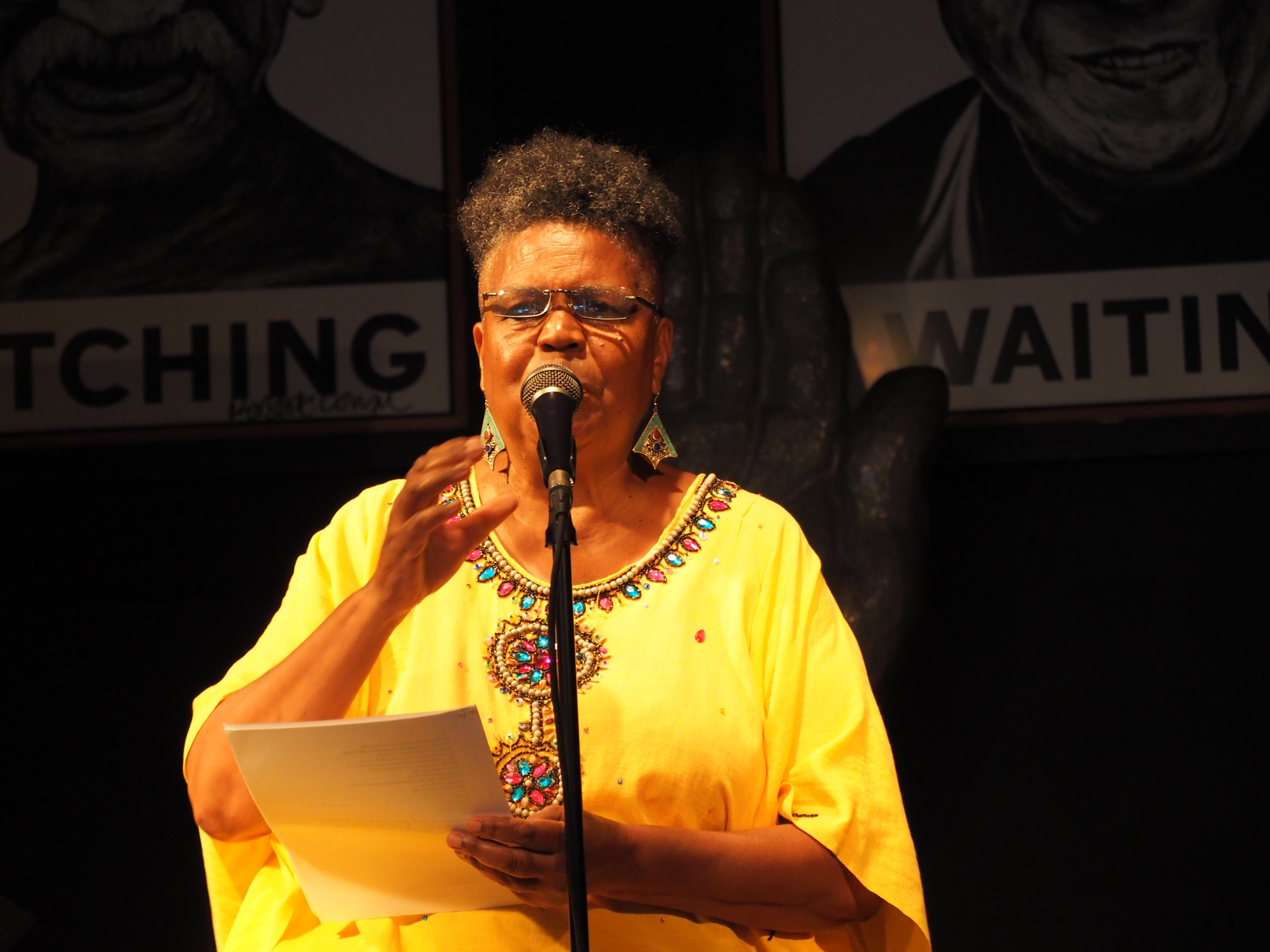
- Kai in Washington, D.C. 2018
- Occupations: Playwright, poet and novelist
- Movement: Black Arts Movement

Nubia Kai Al-Nura Salaam is an American playwright, poet, and novelist from Detroit, Michigan, who now lives in Washington, D.C. A lecturer at various American universities, she has published Solos and I Spread My Wings And I Fly and contributed to journals such as Essence and The Black Scholar. A student of anthropology and Black studies, she has a PhD in African literature and film.

== Early life ==
Nubia Kai grew up in Detroit during the 1950s–1960s. She was not interested in reading or literature until she discovered Euro-American literature in the 11th grade. She started writing poetry about her love for music and nature at the age of 18. According to Kai, she was able to find her voice in poetry through the Black Arts Movement. Kai gained her name from a poem written by a friend. As a growing adult, Kai participated in events thrown by the Black Panther Party and other African-American organizations through her art. She was also a part of an African tribal family called the Bay family, who focused on cultural nationalism and reclaiming their heritage. Later in life, Kai adopted the Islamic religion and became Muslim through the study of African traditions and religions.

== Accomplishments ==
Aside from her degrees, Kai has taught in the History Department at George Washington University. She was also an assistant professor at Howard University's Department of Arts. She taught as an adjunct professor at the University of Maryland-Baltimore in Africana Studies.

She has won three Michigan Council awards, three D.C. Commission for the Arts awards and three Tompkin awards. Along with those, she also won two McCree Theatre awards, two National Endowment for the Arts awards, and a Larry Neal Writer's Competition for Poetry award. Kai has been published in magazines and journals such as Essence, Black World, the Black American Literature Forum, the Journal of the African Literature Association and the Journal of Black Poetry.

== Contributions ==
Kai's first published piece of poetry was 1975's collection called Peace of Mind. After Peace of Mind, she worked as a playwright on the production of Parting. This play was a part of the 1983–1984 season at the New Federal Theatre and was also produced at the Penumbra Theatre, ETA Theatre, and Tafari Jirani Theatre. Kai published another collection of poems called Solos soon after in 1988. Later on, she published a children's book of short stories called The Sweetest Berry on the Bush in 1993. After writing poetry and plays for a while, she set out to research the history of African cultures. Kai wrote Journey to My Ethiopian Homeland and published it in Fall of 2013. She wrote a scholarly text called Kuma Malinke Historiography: Sundiata Keita to Almamy Samon Toure in 2014. After writing Kuma Malinke Historiography, Kai published her book I Spread My Wings And I Fly in 2016.

Kai's writing and research is focused on her identity and the culture of her people. She writes about Black stories and the experiences of Black people through time. Solos, published in 1988, is a collection of poetry about the community of the African diaspora and what connects that community. Kai's poetry is centered on African culture and the experience of the African diaspora. She uses imagery of music, nature and other things to symbolize the sacred themes of African religions and spiritualities. She utilizes the elements of her poetry to show the connection between Africans and African-American individuals. I Spread My Wings And I Fly, published in 2016, is a historical novel about the maroons in the mid-1850s in southern Louisiana. The maroons were enslaved Africans who ran away and lived independent lives by engaging in guerilla warfare. This novel focuses on exploring the culture of enslaved Africans and the role of maroon warfare in the road to Emancipation.

Kai has written multiple plays that have been produced such as Harvest the Frost and Parting. Some of her other plays have been published in books such as Roots and Blossoms, which was edited by Daphnew Williams-Ntiri. Parting was produced by Woodie King, Jr. at The New Federal Theatre in the summer of 1983. Kai's play, Parting also toured in Michigan with the Aldyanna Theatre Co. in 1988. It was also produced at Howard University's Theater festival during the summer of 1992. Parting is a play about a relationship between two characters, Sherrie and Sudan. Sudan is Sherrie's boyfriend who is also a revolutionary poet. In this story, Sherrie realizes that Sudan's challenges in the world are similar to the obstacles they have in their relationship. This causes Sherrie to leave the relationship. Harvest the Frost was first produced by Penumbra Theatre in October 1984.
