= What I Know About You =

2023 novel by Éric Chacour

- Author: Éric Chacour
- Translator: Pablo Strauss
- Publisher: Éditions Alto
- Publication date: August 24, 2023
- Publication place: Canada
- English publication date: November 7, 2024
- Awards: Prix des Libraires 2024; Prix Femina des lycéens 2023
- ISBN: 978-2384820344

What I Know About You (French: Ce que je sais de toi) is a novel by Éric Chacour, published on August 24, 2023, by Éditions Alto in Quebec and by Éditions Philippe Rey in France. The English translation by Pablo Strauss was published by Coach House Books and Pushkin Press in 2024.

The novel focuses on relations in a Levantine-Egyptian family, and a romantic relationship that strains existing norms, expectations and responsibilities. It won the prix des Libraires in 2024, making Chacour the second Québécois to win the prize after Anne Hébert in 1971.

== Plot ==
What I Know About You follows Tarek, a young doctor taking over his father's medical practice in 1980s Cairo. His choice to open a dispensary in the poorer neighborhood of Mokattam leads him to meet Ali. Their relationship will alter the course of his otherwise pre-ordained life.

== Narrative focus and style ==
The book touches on many themes around human and familial relations, including love, homosexuality, gender, prostitution, migration, and fate.

The novel is broken up into three steadily shorter sections, that gradually reveal the position of the omniscient narrator. The first section "You" is written in the second person, and focuses on the story of Tarek. The second section "Me," mostly written in the first person, allows the narrator to reveal themselves. Finally, the shortest (third) section "We," describes the relationship between the two characters in a dozen pages.

== Translations ==
In 2024, the novel was translated into English by Pablo Strauss, and published by Coach House Books in Canada and Pushkin Press in the United Kingdom. The translated version was a finalist for the Giller Prize, the Dayne Ogilvie Prize for debut books by LGBTQ writers, and for the Atwood Gibson Writers' Trust Fiction Prize in 2024.

As of July 2025, the novel had been translated into more than 10 languages.

== Reception ==
As of 2025, the novel had sold more than 300,000 copies, and won a number of awards.

In 2026, the novel was shortlisted for the international Dublin Literary Award, and was selected for One eRead Canada, a digital book club which saw both its English and French versions distributed in ebook and audiobook versions by participating libraries for the month of April, without waitlists or holds.

=== Awards ===
The novel has won over 12 prizes, including:

- The CALQ prize Œuvre de la relève à Montréal prize;
- The prix des cinq continents de la francophonie in 2024;
- The prix Femina des lycéens in 2023;
- The discovery prize of the fondation Prince Pierre de Monaco;
- The prize of the Festival du premier roman ("Festival of the first novel") of Chambéry in 2024;
- The "Première Plume" prize in 2023;
- The prix des Libraires 2024;
- The "Libraires en Seine Corinne-Kim" award in 2024;
- Selection in the second tier for the prix Femina in 2024;
- Selection in the second tier for the prix Renaudot.
