= Azza Filali =

Tunisian writer

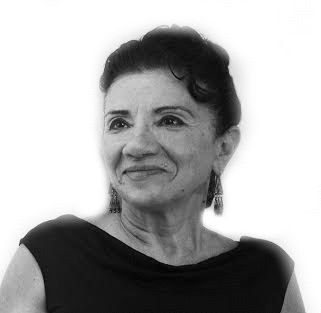
- Born: Tunisia
- Notable work: Ouatann, Les Intranquilles
- Awards: Golden Comar Awards

Azza Filali (born 1952, in Tunisia) is a Tunisian doctor and writer in the French language. Her novels and stories especially reflect the history of the last years of colonialism in Tunisia

== Career ==
Azza Filali was born around 1952 in Tunisia and trained in the medical field of Gastroenterology. In 2012 she published the novel Ouatann, reflecting the era of pre-revolutionary Tunisia in 2008. With this work, she received the Golden Comar Awards in 2012.

In February 2012 she organized a colloquium with the French Institute on writing about themes in post-revolutionary Tunisia. In 2014 she published Les Intranquilles in which she narrates a story with the background of the Tunisian revolution of 2011. Her three women protagonists in Les Intranquilles were the reflection of the struggle of Tunisian women for their freedom during the revolutionary period. The novel was revised in 2015.

Besides being a doctor and writer, Azza Filali since 2011 has also collaborated in the writing of several articles in the media. She is a regular contributor to the newspaper La Presse de Tunisie.

== Bibliography ==
=== Novels ===
- Monsieur L. (1999)
- Les Vallées de lumière (2001)
- Chronique d’un décalage (2005)
- Vingt ans pour plus tard (2009)
- L'Heure du cru (2009)
- Ouatann (2012)
- Les Intranquilles (2014)
- Chronique d'un décalage (2020)
- Malentendues (2024)

=== Short stories ===
- Propos changeants sur l'amour (2003)

=== Short story collections ===
- De face et sans chapeau (2016)

=== Non-fiction ===
- Le Voyageur immobile : réflexions sur la pratique médicale (1991)
- Le Jardin écarlate (1996)
