= Yamen Manai =

Tunisian writer

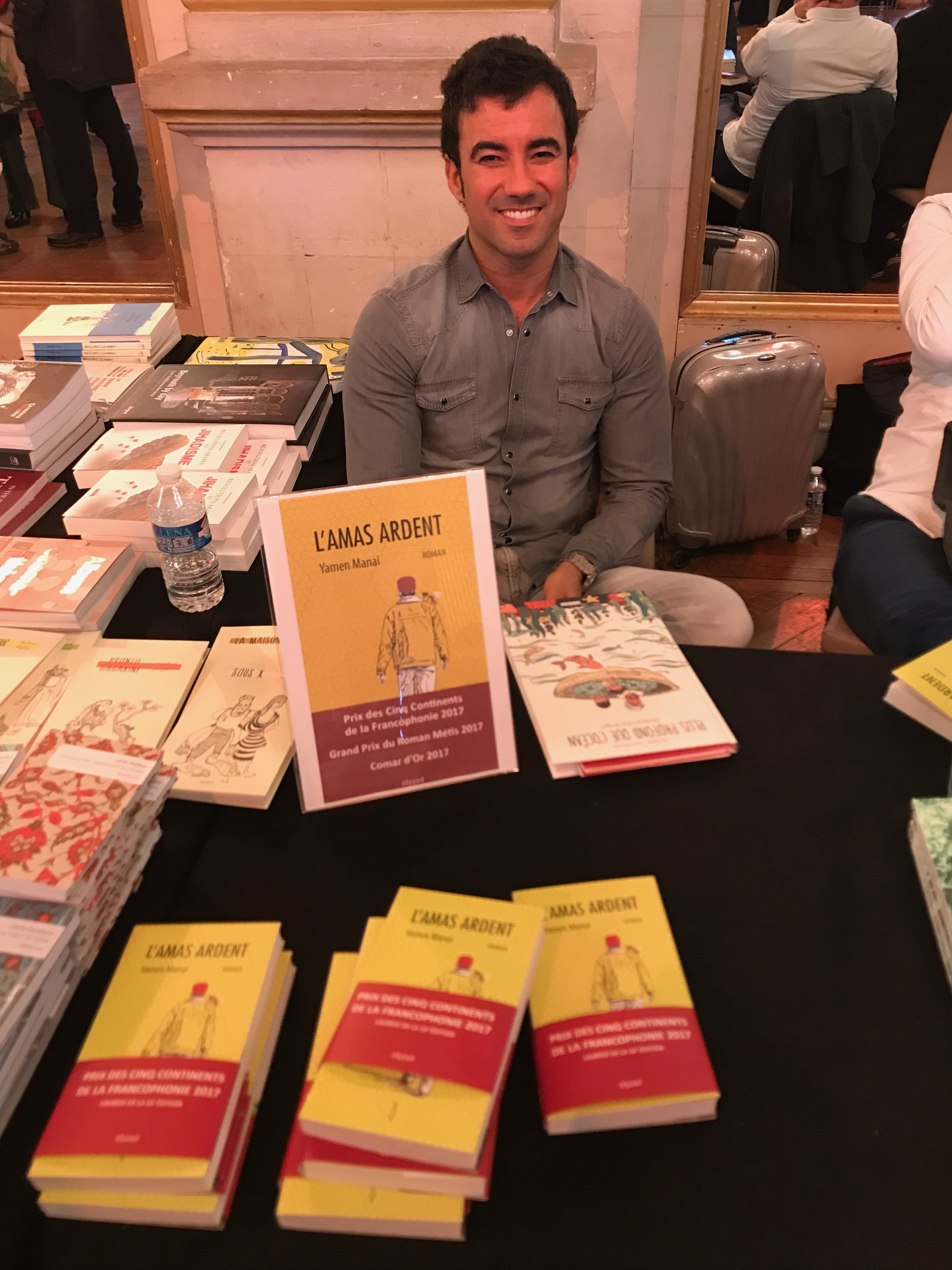
- Yamen Manai
- Born: 1980 (age 45–46); Tunis

Yamen Manai is a Tunisian writer. His debut novel La Marche de l’incertitude appeared in 2010 and won the Comar d’Or Prize in Tunisia, and the Lycéens Coup de Cœur de Coup de Soleil Prize in France. His next book La Sérénade d’Ibrahim Santos (Elyzad, 2011) was nominated for the Prix des cinq continents de la francophonie, and won the Biblioblog Prize as well as the Alain-Fournier Prize. His third novel is titled L’Amas ardent and has been translated into English by Lara Vergnaud. In September 2021, he published Bel Abîme. In June 2022, Yamen Manaï won the 4th Orange Book Prize in Africa.

Manai lives in Paris.

== Works ==
- La Marche de l'incertitude (in French). Tunis: Elyzad. 2010. ISBN 978-9973-58-029-0..
- La Sérénade d'Ibrahim Santos (in French). Tunis: Elyzad. 2011. ISBN 978-9973-58-035-1..
- Collectif (2012). Nouvelles de Tunisie (in French). Paris: Magellan et Cie. ISBN 978-2-35074-243-4..
- L'Amas ardent: roman (in French). Tunis: Elyzad. 2017. ISBN 978-9973-58-092-4..
- Bel abîme: roman (in French). Tunis: Elyzad. 2021. ISBN 978-2492-27-044-4..
