= Mohamed Mbougar Sarr =

Senegalese writer

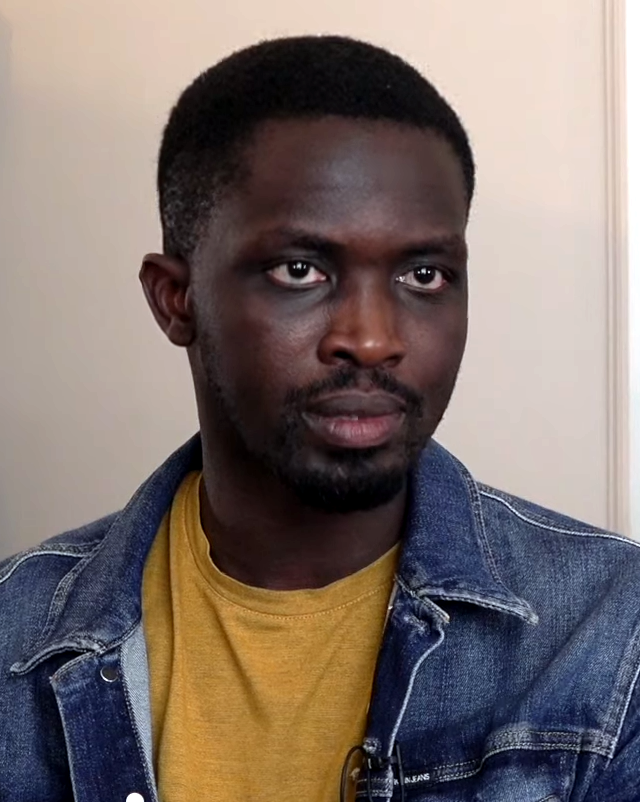
- Mohamed Mbougar Sarr in 2021
- Born: 20 June 1990 (age 36); Dakar, Senegal
- Education: Prytanée militaire de Saint-Louis; Lycée Pierre-d'Ailly
- Alma mater: School for Advanced Studies in the Social Sciences
- Occupation: Writer
- Writing career
- Language: French
- Years active: 2014–present
- Notable work: The Most Secret Memory of Men (2021)
- Notable awards: Prix Goncourt (2021)
- Website: chosesrevues.over-blog.com

Mohamed Mbougar Sarr (born 20 June 1990) is a Senegalese writer. Raised in Diourbel, Senegal and later studying in France, Sarr is the author of four novels as well as a number of award-winning short stories. He won the 2021 Prix Goncourt for his novel The Most Secret Memory of Men, becoming the first Sub-Saharan African to do so.

== Early life ==
Mohamed Mbougar Sarr was born in 1990 in Dakar, Senegal. The son of a physician, he grew up in a large Serer family in Diourbel. He completed his secondary studies at the Prytanée militaire of Saint-Louis, an elite school in Senegal. He moved to France to study in CPGE (classe préparatoire aux grandes écoles) at the lycée Pierre-d'Ailly in Compiègne. He later studied at the School for Advanced Studies in the Social Sciences (EHESS), where his research focused on Léopold Sédar Senghor. Sarr began writing more and pursued fiction, opting not to finish his thesis at the EHESS.

== Career ==
Sarr's short story "La cale" (2014), about the slave trade, was awarded the Prix Stéphane-Hessel. His debut novel, Terre ceinte (2015), describes life in a fictional Sahelian village under the control of Islamist jihadi militias. In 2015, it received the Prix Ahmadou-Kourouma at the Salon du livre of Geneva. It was also awarded the 2015 Grand prix du roman métis by the city of Saint-Denis de La Réunion, as well as the 2015 Prix du roman métis des lycéens. In 2021, an English translation by Alexia Trigo, titled Brotherhood, was published by Europa Editions.

At the 2017 Jeux de la Francophonie, he received the bronze medal in the literature category for his short story "Ndënd".

His second novel, Silence du chœur (2017), a portrait of the day-to-day life of African migrants in Sicily, received the prix littérature monde at the Étonnants Voyageurs festival in Saint-Malo. It also received the Prix du roman métis des lecteurs of Saint-Denis de La Réunion in 2018. In 2024, an English translation by Alison Anderson, titled The Silence of the Choir, was published by Europa Editions.

His third novel, De purs hommes (2018), deals with the prejudice and violence surrounding homosexuality in Senegal, where it is still illegal to be openly gay.

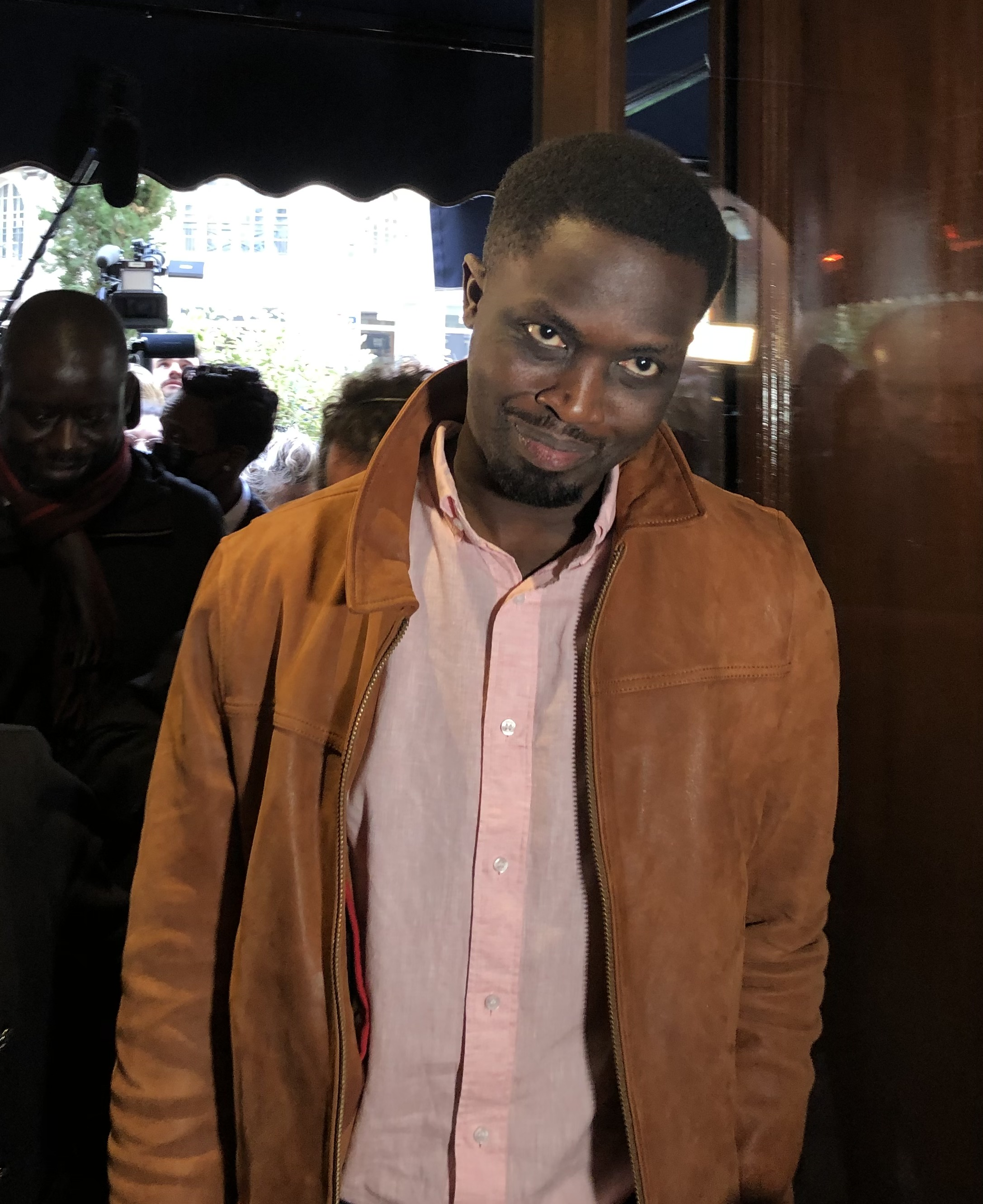
Mohamed Mbougar Sarr entering Drouant in Paris to receive the Prix Goncourt on 3 November 2021.

In November 2021, he was awarded the Prix Goncourt for his novel La plus secrète mémoire des hommes (lit. 'The Most Secret Memory of Men'). Sarr won in the first round of voting, by six votes against three votes for Sorj Chalandon and one vote for Louis-Philippe Dalembert. He is the first person from Sub-Saharan Africa to win the Prix Goncourt,. At 31 years old, he is also the youngest Goncourt laureate since Patrick Grainville won in 1976. The novel was also shortlisted for the Prix Femina and the Prix Renaudot; and longlisted for the Prix Médicis and for the 2023 National Book Award for Translated Literature.

== Prizes ==
- 2014: Prix Stéphane-Hessel for "La cale"
- 2015: Prix Ahmadou-Kourouma for Brotherhood
- 2015: Grand prix du roman métis for Brotherhood
- 2021: Prix Goncourt for The Most Secret Memory of Men

== Works ==
- — (2014). "La cale".
- — (2014). Terre ceinte. Paris: Éditions Présence Africaine. ISBN 978-2-7087-0881-5.
  - — (2021). Brotherhood. Translated by Trigo, Alexia. Europa Editions. ISBN 978-1-60945-672-6.
- — (2017). Silence du chœur. Paris: Éditions Présence Africaine. ISBN 9782708709041.
  - — (2024). The Silence of the Choir. Translated by Anderson, Alison. New York: Europa Editions. ISBN 9798889660200.
- — (2018). De purs hommes. Éditions Philippe Rey / Jimsaan. ISBN 978-2-84876-663-8.
  - — (2026). Pure Men. Translated by Vergnaud, Lara. New York: Other Press. ISBN 978-1-63542-470-6.
- — (2021). La plus secrète mémoire des hommes. Éditions Philippe Rey / Jimsaan. ISBN 978-2-84876-886-1.
  - — (2023). The Most Secret Memory of Men. Translated by Vergnaud, Lara. New York: Other Press. ISBN 978-1-63542-327-3.
