= List of novelists by nationality =

Well-known authors of novels, listed by country:

== Afghanistan ==
- Aliyeh Ataei (born 1981)
- Khaled Hosseini (born 1965)
- Jamil Jan Kochai (born 1992)
- Akram Osman (1937–2016)
- Nemat Sadat (born 1979)
- Rahnaward Zaryab (1944–2020)

== Albania ==
- Dritero Agolli (1931–2017)
- Ismail Kadare (1936–2024)
- Fatos Kongoli (born 1944)
- Faik Konitza (1875–1942)
- Migjeni (1911–1938)
- Haki Stermilli (1895–1953)
- Jakov Xoxa (1923–1979)

== Algeria ==
- Marguerite Taos Amrouche (1913–1976)
- Rachid Boudjedra (born 1941)
- Albert Camus (1913–1960)
- Mohammed Dib (1920–2003)
- Tahar Djaout (1954–1993)
- Assia Djebar (1936–2015)
- Frantz Fanon (1925–1961), originally from Martinique
- Mouloud Feraoun (1913–1962)
- Mouloud Mammeri (1917–1989)
- Rachid Mimouni (1945–1995)
- Ahlam Mostaghanemi (born 1953)
- Leïla Sebbar (born 1941)
- Kateb Yacine (1929–1989)

== Roman Empire|Ancient Latin authors ==
- Apuleius (c. 124–c. 170)
- Petronius (c. 27–66)

== Angola ==
- José Eduardo Agualusa (born 1960)
- Sousa Jamba (born 1966)
- Ondjaki (born 1977)
- Pepetela (born 1941)
- Oscar Ribas (1909–2004)
- Manuel Rui (born 1941)
- José Luandino Vieira (born 1935)

== Antigua and Barbuda ==
- Joanne C. Hillhouse (born 1973)
- Marie-Elena John
- Jamaica Kincaid (born 1949)

== Argentina ==
- Marcos Aguinis (born 1935)
- César Aira (born 1949)
- Adolfo Bioy Casares (1914–1999)
- Abelardo Castillo (1935–2017)
- Julio Cortázar (1914–1984)
- Macedonio Fernandez (1874–1952)
- Oscar R. Gómez (born 1956)
- Ricardo Güiraldes (1886–1927)
- Sylvia Iparraguirre (born 1947)
- Leopoldo Marechal (1900–1970)
- Manuel Puig (1932–1990)
- Andrés Rivera (1928–2016)
- Juan José Saer (1937–2005)
- Ernesto Sábato (1911–2011)
- Luisa Valenzuela (born 1938)
- Jorge Luis Borges (1899–1986)

== Armenia ==
- Michael Arlen (1895–1956)
- Zori Balayan (born 1935)
- Ruben Hovsepyan (1939–2016)
- Levon Khechoyan (1955–2014)
- Yervant Odian (1869–1926)
- Alexander Shirvanzade (1858–1935)
- Zabel Yesayan (1878–1943)

== Assyria ==
- Khalil Gibran (1883–1931)
- Thea Halo (born 1941)
- Ivan Kakovitch (1933–2006)
- Rosie Malek-Yonan (born 1965)
- Obelit Yadgar (1945–2023)

== Austria ==
- Vicki Baum (1888–1960)
- Hugo Bettauer (1872–1925)
- Thomas Bernhard (1931–1989)
- Hermann Broch (1886–1951)
- Peter Handke (born 1942)
- Josef Haslinger (born 1955)
- Elfriede Jelinek (born 1946)
- Robert Musil (1880–1942)
- Joseph Roth (1894–1939)
- Robert Schneider (born 1961)
- Arthur Schnitzler (1862–1931)
- Bertha von Suttner (1843–1914)
- Stefan Zweig (1881–1942)

== Azerbaijan ==
- Akram Aylisli (born 1937)
- Alaviyya Babayeva (1921–2014)
- Afag Masud (born 1957)
- Elchin Safarli (born 1984)
- Kurban Said

== Bangladesh ==
- Humayun Ahmed (1948–2012)
- Shaheen Akhtar (born 1962)
- Monica Ali (born 1967)
- Tahmima Anam (born 1975)
- Humayun Azad (1947–2004)
- Dilara Hashem (1935–2022)
- Taslima Nasrin (born 1962)
- Kazi Nazrul Islam (1899–1976)
- Rizia Rahman (1939–2019)
- Muhammad Yunus (born 1940)

== Barbados ==
- Austin Clarke (1934–2016)
- Geoffrey Drayton (1924–2017)
- J. B. Emtage (1902–1995)
- Agymah Kamau
- Anthony Kellman (born 1955)
- Odimumba Kwamdela (1942–2019)
- George Lamming (1927–2022)
- Karen Lord (born 1968)
- Glenville Lovell (born 1955)

== Belarus ==
- Vasil Bykaŭ (1924–2003)
- Uładzimir Karatkievič (1930–1984)
- Jakub Kołas (Kanstancy Mickievič) (1882–1956)
- Janka Kupała (Ivan Łucevič) (1882–1942)
- Ivan Šamiakin (1921–2004)

== Belgium ==
- Nicolas Ancion (born 1971)
- Cornelis de Bie (1627–c. 1715)
- Louis Paul Boon (1912–1979)
- Hendrik Conscience (1812–1883)
- Ernest Claes (1885–1968)
- Hugo Claus (1929–2008)
- Christine D'Haen (1923–2009)
- Johan Daisne (1912–1978)
- Charles De Coster (1827–1879)
- Willem Elsschot (1882–1960)
- Jef Geeraerts (1930–2015)
- Guido Gezelle (1830–1899)
- Marnix Gijsen (1899–1984)
- Hubert Lampo (1920–2006)
- Rosalie Loveling (1834–1875)
- Virginie Loveling (1836–1923)
- Maurice Maeterlinck (1862–1949)
- Alice Nahon (1896–1933)
- Amélie Nothomb (born 1966)
- Anne Provoost (born 1964)
- Maria Rosseels (1916–2005)
- Georges Simenon (1903–1989)
- Stijn Streuvels (1871–1969)
- Herman Teirlinck (1879–1967)
- Felix Timmermans (1886–1947)
- André Henri Constant van Hasselt (1806–1874)
- Karel Van Mander (1548–1606)
- Emile Verhaeren (1855–1916)
- Peter Verhelst (born 1962)
- Gerard Walschap (1898–1989)
- Jan Frans Willems (1793–1846)
- Marguerite Yourcenar (1903–1987)
- Lode Zielens (1901–1944)

== Belize ==
- Zee Edgell (1940–2020)
- Evan X Hyde (born 1947)
- John Alexander Watler (1938–2015)
- Colville Young (born 1932)
- Edward Broaster
- Emory King (1931–2007)

== Benin ==
- Berte-Evelyne Agbo (see also Senegal)
- Florent Couao-Zotti (born 1964)
- Richard Dogbeh (see also Togo, Senegal and Ivory Coast)
- Adélaïde Fassinou (born 1955)

== Bermuda ==
- Angela Barry
- Brian Burland (1931–2010)

== Bosnia and Herzegovina ==
- Ivo Andrić (1892–1975)
- Andrej Nikolaidis (born 1974)
- Meša Selimović (1910–1982)
- Miljenko Jergović (1966)

== Botswana ==
- Caitlin Davies (born 1964), born in Britain
- Unity Dow (born 1959)
- Bessie Head (1937–1986), born in South Africa
- Andrew Sesinyi (born 1952)
- Mositi Torontle (born 1964)

== Brazil ==
- José Alencar (1931–2011)
- Manuel Antônio de Almeida (1831–1861)
- Jorge Amado (1912–2001)
- Mário de Andrade (1893–1945)
- Oswald de Andrade (1890–1954)
- Machado de Assis (1839–1908)
- Lima Barreto (1881–1922)
- Chico Buarque (born 1944)
- Lúcio Cardoso (1912–1968)
- Paulo Coelho (born 1947)
- Rubem Fonseca (1925–2020)
- Clarice Lispector (1920–1977)
- Joaquim Manoel de Macedo (1820–1882)
- Raduan Nassar (born 1935)
- Raul Pompéia (1863–1895)
- Fernando Sabino (1923–2004)
- Moacyr Scliar (1935–2011)
- Graciliano Ramos (1892–1953)
- José Lins do Rego (1901–1957)
- João Ubaldo Ribeiro (1941–2014)
- João Guimarães Rosa (1908–1967)
- Murilo Rubião (1916–1991)
- Érico Veríssimo (1905–1975)
- Lygia Fagundes Telles (1923–1922)

== Bulgaria ==
- Dimitar Dimov
- Dimitar Talev
- Pavel Vezhinov
- Emiliyan Stanev
- Georgi Karaslavov
- Konstantin Konstantinov
- Georgi Gospodinov
- Georgi Bozhinov
- Zahari Karabashliev
- Ivan Vazov
- Emil Andreev
- Zdravka Evtimova
- Agop Melkonyan
- Albena Stambolova

== Burkina Faso ==
- Nazi Boni (1909–1969)
- Sarah Bouyain (born 1968)
- Norbert Zongo (1949–1998)

== Cameroon ==
- Marie-Thérèse Assiga Ahanda (c.1941–2014)
- Francis Bebey (1929–2001)
- Mongo Beti, pseudonym of Alexandre Biyidi Awala (1932–2001)
- Calixthe Beyala (born 1961)
- Mbella Sonne Dipoko (1936–2009)
- Frieda Ekotto
- Jean-Louis Njemba Medu (1902–1966)
- Ferdinand Oyono (1929–2010)
- René Philombé (1930–2001)

== Canada ==
- Rebecca Agatha Armour (1845–1891)
- Margaret Atwood (born 1939)
- Irene Baird (1901–1981)
- Mary Balogh (born 1944)
- Pierre Berton (1920–2004)
- Marie-Claire Blais (1939–2021)
- Morley Callaghan (1903–1990)
- Deborah Joy Corey (born 1958)
- Robertson Davies (1913–1995)
- Ranj Dhaliwal (born 1976)
- Réjean Ducharme (1941–2017)
- Louis Emond (born 1969)
- Musharraf Ali Farooqi (born 1968)
- Timothy Findley (1930–2002) (See also France)
- Gayleen Froese (born 1972)
- Donald Jack (1924–2003)
- Hugh MacLennan (1907–1990)
- Margaret Laurence (1926–1987)
- Stephen Leacock (1869–1944)
- Yann Martel (born 1963)
- Rohinton Mistry (born 1952)
- Lucy Maud Montgomery (1874–1942)
- Susanna Moodie (1803–1885)
- Christopher G. Moore (born 1952)
- Farley Mowat (1921–2014)
- Alice Munro (1931–2024)
- Michael Ondaatje (born 1943)
- Michèle Plomer (born 1965)
- Mordecai Richler (1931–2001)
- Gabrielle Roy (1909–1983)
- Margaret Marshall Saunders (1861–1947)
- Arthur Scaife (c. 1855–1934)
- Carol Shields (1935–2003)
- Catharine Parr Traill (1802–1899)
- Roland Michel Tremblay (born 1972)
- Jane Urquhart (born 1949)

== Cape Verde ==
- Germano Almeida (born 1945)
- Manuel Lopes (1907–2005)

== Catalonia ==
- Raimon Llull (1235–1315)
- Ramon Muntaner (c. 1270–1336)
- Joanot Martorell (1413–1468)
- Narcís Oller (1846–1930)
- Mercè Rodoreda (1909–1983)

== Chad ==
- Marie-Christine Koundja (born 1957)

== Chile ==
- Isabel Allende (born 1942)
- Roberto Bolaño (1953–2003)
- Francisco Coloane (1910–2002)
- José Donoso (1924–1996)
- Jorge Edwards (1931–2023)
- Baldomero Lillo (1867–1923)
- Manuel Rojas (1924–1993)
- Luis Sepúlveda (1949–2020)
- Marcela Serrano (born 1951)
- Amelia Solar de Claro (1836–1915)
- Mercedes Valdivieso (1924–1993)

== China ==
- Cao Xueqin (c. 1715–1763)
- Dai Sijie (born 1954)
- Gao Xingjian (born 1940)
- Han Shaogong (born 1953)
- Lao She (1899–1966)
- Li Yu (1610–1680)
- Lu Xun (1881–1936)
- Mao Dun (1896–1981)
- Mo Yan (born 1955)
- Qian Zhongshu (1910–1998)
- Wang Shuo (born 1958)
- Wei Jingsheng (born 1950)
- Zhang Ailing (1920–1995)

== Colombia ==
- Héctor Abad Faciolince (born 1958)
- Jaime Manrique (born 1949)
- Gabriel García Márquez (1927–2014)
- José Eustasio Rivera (1888–1928)
- Álvaro Mutis (1923–2013)

== Republic of the Congo ==
- Emmanuel Dongala (born 1941)
- Paul Lomami-Tshibamba (1914–1985)
- Henri Lopes (1937–2023)
- Alain Mabanckou (born 1966)
- Jeannette Balou Tchichelle (1947–2005)

== Democratic Republic of the Congo ==
(formerly Zaïre)

- Amba Bongo
- Maguy Kabamba (born 1960)
- Sony Labou Tansi (1947–1995)
- V. Y. Mudimbe (1941–2025)
- Yamusangie, Frederick Kambemba

== Cosmopolitanism|Cosmopolitan ==
- Romain Gary, Russian-born French writer
- Franz Kafka (1883–1924), lived in Prague during Austria-Hungary and Czechoslovakia; German language writer; see also German literature
- Arthur Koestler (1905–1983)
- Milan Kundera (1929–2023), born in Czechoslovakia, but moved to France. Multi-language writer.
- Salman Rushdie (born 1947), born in India, but moved abroad later. English language writer, author of The Satanic Verses

== Costa Rica ==
- Fabián Dobles Rodríguez (1918–1997)
- Joaquín García Monge (1881–1958)
- Yolanda Oreamuno (1916–1956)
- Roxana Pinto

== Côte d'Ivoire|Ivory Coast ==
- Tanella Boni (1954–2026)
- Micheline Coulibaly (1950–2003)
- Bernard Dadié (1916–2019)
- Richard Dogbeh (1932–2003). See also Benin, Senegal and Togo
- Fatou Keïta (born 1965)
- Ahmadou Kourouma (1927–2003)
- Werewere-Liking Gnepo (born 1950). See also Cameroon
- Véronique Tadjo (born 1955)

== Croatia ==
- Marija Jurić Zagorka (1873–1957)
- Miroslav Krleža (1893–1981)
- Zlata Kolarić-Kišur (1894–1990)
- Ivo Andrić (1892–1975)
- Ivan Aralica (born 1930)
- Vesna Krmpotić (1932–2018)
- Tomislav Ladan (1932–2008)
- Dubravka Ugrešić (1949–2023)
- Julijana Matanović (born 1959)
- Ivan Baran (born 1996)
- Zoran Krušvar (born 1977)

== Cuba ==
- Reinaldo Arenas (1943–1990)
- Alejo Carpentier (1904–1980)
- Daína Chaviano (born 1957)
- José Lezama Lima (1910–1976)
- Leonardo Padura Fuentes (born 1955)

== Czech Republic ==
- Karel Čapek (1890–1938)
- Jaroslav Hašek (1883–1923)
- Bohumil Hrabal (1914–1997)
- Milan Kundera (1929–2023)
- Jaroslav Seifert (1901–1986)

== Denmark ==
- Hans Christian Andersen (1805–1875)
- Karen Blixen (1885–1962) (pen name: Isak Dinesen), author of Seven Gothic Tales (1934), Out of Africa (1937)
- Peter Høeg (born 1957)
- Jens Peter Jacobsen (1847–1885)
- Johannes Vilhelm Jensen (1873–1950), Nobel Prize for Literature (1944)
- Christian Jungersen (born 1962)
- Morten Korch (1876–1954)
- Carl Erik Soya (1896–1983)

== Djibouti ==
- Waberi Abdourahman (born 1965)

== Ecuador ==
- Jorge Enrique Adoum (1926–2009)
- Rosalía Arteaga (born 1956)
- Aminta Buenaño (born 1958)
- Benjamín Carrión (1897–1979)
- Ileana Espinel (1933–2001)
- María Fernanda Espinosa (born 1964)
- Enrique Gil Gilbert (1912–1973)
- Jorge Icaza (1906–1978)
- Salomon Isacovici (1924–1998)
- Edna Iturralde (born 1948)
- Violeta Luna (born 1943)
- José Martínez Queirolo (1931–2008)
- Nela Martínez (1912–2004)
- Juan Montalvo (1832–1889)
- Gonzalo Zaldumbide (1884–1965)

== Egypt ==
- Alifa Rifaat (1930–1996)
- Ahdaf Soueif (born 1950)
- Bahaa Taher (1935–2022)
- Edward al-Kharrat (1926–2015)
- Ibrahim Aslan (1935–2012)
- Gamal Al-Ghitani (1945–2015)
- Khairy Shalaby (1938–2011)
- Muhammad Husayn Haykal (1888–1956)
- Nabil Farouk (1956–2020)
- Naguib Mahfouz (1911–2006), Nobel Prize for Literature (1988), famous for the Cairo Trilogy about life in the sprawling inner city.
- Nawal El Saadawi (1931–2021)
- Saleh Morsi (1939–1996)
- Sonallah Ibrahim (1937–2025)
- Tawfiq al-Hakim (1898–1987)
- Yahya Haqqi (1905–1992)
- Youssef Ziedan (born 1958)
- Yusuf Idris (1927–1991)

== Equatorial Guinea ==
- María Nsué Angüe (1945–2017)
- Donato Ndongo-Bidyogo (born 1950)
- Juan Tomás Ávila Laurel (born 1966)

== Estonia ==
- Sass Henno (born 1982)
- Kaur Kender (born 1971)
- Albert Kivikas (1898–1978)
- Andrus Kivirähk (born 1970)
- Jaan Kross (1920–2007)
- Leo Kunnas (born 1967)
- Juhan Liiv (1864–1913)
- Tõnu Õnnepalu (a.k.a. Emil Tode, born 1962)
- Kersti Merilaas (1913–1986)
- Lilli Promet (1922–2007)
- Karl Ristikivi (1912–1977)
- Raivo Seppo (born 1973)
- Juhan Smuul (1922–1971)
- A. H. Tammsaare (1878–1940)
- Enn Vetemaa (1936–2017)
- Heiki Vilep (born 1960)

== Ethiopia ==
- Haddis Alemayehu (1910–2003)
- Āfawarq Gabra Iyasus (1868–1947)
- Moges Kebede
- Dinaw Mengestu (born 1978)
- Maaza Mengiste (born 1971)
- Nega Mezlekia (born 1958)
- Hama Tuma (born 1949)
- Berhanu Zerihun (1933/4–1987)

== Finland ==
- Juhani Aho (1861–1921)
- Tove Jansson (1914–2001), she wrote in Swedish
- Aino Kallas (1878–1956)
- Aleksis Kivi (1834–1872)
- Väinö Linna (1920–1992)
- Johannes Linnankoski (1869–1913)
- Arto Paasilinna (1942–2018)
- Kalle Päätalo (1919–2000)
- Frans Emil Sillanpää (1888–1964), Nobel Prize for Literature, 1939
- Mika Waltari (1908–1979)

== Gabon ==
- Jean-Baptiste Abessolo (born 1932)
- Bessora (born in Belgium) (born 1968)
- Charline Effah (born 1977)
- René Maran, born near Martinique (1887–1960)
- Chantal Magalie Mbazo'o-Kassa (born 1967)
- Nadia Origo (born 1977)
- Angèle Ntyugwetondo Rawiri (1954–2010)

== Gambia ==
- Ebou Dibba (1943–2000)
- Ramatoulie Othman
- Lenrie Peters (1932–2009)
- Sally Singhateh (born 1977)

== Georgia ==
- Mikheil Javakhishvili (1880–1937)
- Alexander Kazbegi (1848–1893)
- Vazha-Pshavela (1861-1915)
- Iakob Gogebashvili (1840–1912)
- David Kldiashvili (1862–1931)
- Ekaterine Gabashvili (1851–1938)
- Ilia Chavchavadze (1837-1907)
- Konstantine Gamsakhurdia (1893–19750
- Nodar Dumbadze (1928–1984)
- Levan Gotua (1905–1973)
- Otar Chiladze (1933–2009)
- Guram Dochanashvili (1939–2021)
- Naira Gelashvili (born 1947)
- Aka Morchiladze (born 1966)
- David Turashvili (born 1966)
- Ana Kordzaia-Samadashvili (born 1968)
- Nino Haratischwili (born 1983)
- Lasha Bugadze (born 1997)

== Germany ==
- Horst Bienek (1930–1990)
- Johannes Bobrowski (1917–1965)
- Heinrich Böll (1917–1985), Nobel Prize for Literature (1972)
- Dietmar Dath (born 1970)
- Alfred Döblin (1878–1957), author of Berlin Alexanderplatz
- Hans Magnus Enzensberger (1929–2022)
- Paul Ernst (1866–1933)
- Jenny Erpenbeck (born 1967)
- Hans Fallada (1893–1947)
- Sherko Fatah (born 1964)
- Theodor Fontane (1819–1898)
- Julia Franck (born 1970)
- Wilhelm Genazino (1943–2018)
- Johann Wolfgang von Goethe (1749–1832), polymath
- Günter Grass (1927–2015), Nobel Prize for Literature (1999)
- Gerhart Hauptmann (1862–1946), Nobel Prize for Literature (1912)
- Helene Hegemann (born 1992)
- Wolfgang Herrndorf (1965–2013)
- Hermann Hesse (1877–1962), Nobel Prize for Literature (1946)
- Stefan Heym (1913–2001)
- Wolfgang Hildesheimer (1916–1991)
- Uwe Johnson (1934–1984)
- Ernst Jünger (1895–1998)
- Marie Luise Kaschnitz (1901–1974)
- Erich Kästner (1899–1974)
- Daniel Kehlmann (born 1975)
- Abbas Khadir (born 1973)
- Heinrich von Kleist (1777–1811)
- Siegfried Lenz (1926–2014)
- Andreas Mand (born 1959)
- Heinrich Mann (1871–1950)
- Klaus Mann (1906–1949)
- Thomas Mann (1875–1955), Nobel Prize for Literature (1929)
- Harald Martenstein (born 1953)
- Eduard Mörike (1804–1875)
- Sten Nadolny (born 1942), author of The Discovery of Slowness
- Erich Maria Remarque (1898–1970), author of Im Westen nichts Neues, or All Quiet on the Western Front (1929)
- Bernhard Schlink (born 1944)
- Peter Schneider (1940–2026)
- W. G. Sebald (1944–2001)
- Anna Seghers (1900–1983)
- Saša Stanišić (born 1978)
- Theodor Storm (1817–1888)
- Patrick Süskind (born 1949), author of Perfume
- Martin Walser (1927–2023)
- Peter Weiss (1916–1982)
- Christa Wolf (1929–2011)
- Arnold Zweig (1887–1968)

== Ghana ==
- Nana Achampong (born 1964)
- Ama Ata Aidoo (1940–2023)
- Ayi Kwei Armah (born 1939)
- Bediako Asare (born 1930), also connected with Tanzania
- Ayesha Harruna Attah (born 1983)
- Nana Oforiatta Ayim
- Kofi Awoonor (1935–2013)
- Yaba Badoe (born 1954)
- Elizabeth-Irene Baitie (born 1970)
- Kofi Batsa (1931–1991)
- J. Benibengor Blay (1915–?)
- William Boyd (born 1952)
- Akosua Busia (born 1966)
- J. E. Casely-Hayford (1866–1930)
- Jojo Cobbinah (born 1948)
- Meri Nana-Ama Danquah (born 1967)
- Amma Darko (born 1956)
- Lawrence Darmani (born 1956)
- Kwame Dawes (born 1962)
- Amu Djoleto (born 1929)
- Cameron Duodu (born 1937)
- Asare Konadu (1932–1994)
- B. Kojo Laing (1946–2017)
- Lesley Lokko (born 1964)
- Nii Ayikwei Parkes (born 1974)
- Kobina Sekyi (1892–1956)
- Taiye Selasi (born 1979)
- Francis Selormey (1927–1988)
- Efua Theodora Sutherland (1924–1996)

== Greece ==
- Aris Alexandrou (1922–1979)
- Errikos Belies (1950–2016)
- Dimitrios Hatzis (1913–1981)
- Andreas Karkavitsas (1866–1922)
- Nikos Kazantzakis (1883–1957)
- George Leonardos (born 1937)
- Pavlos Matesis (1933–2013)
- Alexis Stamatis (born 1960)
- Angelos Terzakis (1907–1979)
- Vassilis Vassilikos (1934–2023)
- Elias Venezis (1904–1973)

== Guatemala ==
- Miguel Ángel Asturias (1899–1974)
- Javier Cárcamo Guzmán (born 1980)
- Carlos Wyld Ospina (1891–1956)
- Javier Payeras (born 1974)
- Máximo Soto Hall
- Carol Zardetto

== Guinea ==
- Sirah Balde de Labe (1929–2018)
- Camara Laye (1928–1980)
- Tierno Monénembo (born 1947)
- Williams Sassine (1944–1997)

== Haïti ==
- Frankétienne (1936–2025)
- Clark Parent (born 1951)
- Jacques Roumain (1907–1944)

== Honduras ==
- Roberto Castillo (1950–2008)
- Julio Escoto (born 1944)
- Javier Abril Espinoza (born 1967)
- Lucila Gamero (1873–1964)

== Hong Kong ==
- Louis Cha (1924–2018)
- Ni Kuang (1935–2022)

== Hungary ==
- Zoltán Ambrus (1861–1932)
- Mihály Babits (1883–1941)
- Zsófia Bán (born 1957)
- Miklós Bánffy (1873–1950)
- Ágota Bozai (born 1965)
- György Dalos (born 1943)
- Anna Dániel (1908–2003)
- József Eötvös (1813–1871)
- Péter Esterházy (1950–2016)
- Klára Fehér (1919–1996)
- István Fekete (1900–1970), author of Vuk
- Géza Gárdonyi (1863–1922)
- Ágnes Gergely (born 1933)
- Ferenc Herczeg (1863–1954)
- Éva Janikovszky (1926–2003), also children's writer
- Mór Jókai (1825–1904), foremost 19th-century novelist
- Margit Kaffka (1880–1918)
- Frigyes Karinthy (1887–1938), author of science-fiction novels
- József Kármán (1768–1795)
- Zsigmond Kemény (1814–1875)
- Rivka Keren (born 1946), writing also in Hebrew
- Imre Kertész (1929–2016), Nobel Prize for Literature (2002)
- János Kodolányi (1899–1969)
- György Konrád (1933–2019)
- Károly Kós (1883–1977)
- Dezső Kosztolányi (1885–1936)
- László Krasznahorkai (born 1954)
- Gyula Krúdy (1878–1933)
- Ervin Lázár (1936–2006), author of children's novels
- Laura Leiner (born 1985), author of young-adult series
- Iván Mándy (1918–1995), author of children's novels
- Sándor Márai (1900–1989)
- Ferenc Molnár (1878–1952), author of The Paul Street Boys
- Ferenc Móra (1879–1934)
- Zsigmond Móricz (1879–1942), foremost novelist of the earlier 20th century
- Kálmán Mikszáth (1847–1910)
- Terézia Mora (born 1971), writing in German
- Péter Nádas (born 1942)
- Borbála Nádasdy (born 1939)
- László Németh (1901–1975)
- Emma Orczy (Baroness Orczy, 1865–1947), writing in English
- Géza Ottlik (1912–1990)
- Jenő Rejtő (1905–1943)
- Henriett Seth F. (born 1980), science-fiction author
- Magda Szabó (1917–2007), author of The Door
- Sándor Szathmári (1897–1974), author of Kazohinia
- Noémi Szécsi (born 1976)
- Júlia Székely (1906–1986)
- Mária Szepes (1908–2007)
- Antal Szerb (1901–1945), author of Journey by Moonlight
- Edina Szvoren (born 1974)
- Áron Tamási (1897–1966)
- Kata Tisza (born 1980)
- Cécile Tormay (1876–1937)
- Albert Wass (1908–1998)

== Iceland ==
- Snorri Sturluson (1179–1241), author of the Younger Edda
- Halldór Laxness (1902–1998), Nobel Prize for Literature (1955)
- Sjón (born 1962), The Nordic Council's Literature Prize (2005)

== Indian subcontinent ==
- Aravind Adiga (born 1974), English
- Ahmed Ali (1910–1994), English, Urdu
- Mulk Raj Anand (1905–2004), English
- Chaudhry Afzal Haq (1891–1942), Urdu, English, Hindi
- Manik Bandopadhyay (1908–1956), Bengali
- Sharadindu Bandyopadhyay (1899–1970), Bengali
- Bibhutibhushan Bandyopadhyay (1894–1950), Bengali
- Tarashankar Banerjee (1898–1971), Bengali
- Ratan Lal Basu (born 1948), English, Bengali
- D. R. Bendre (1896–1981), Kannada
- Ramavriksha Benipuri (1899–1968), Hindi
- Ruskin Bond (born 1934), English
- Buddhadeb Bosu (1908–1974), Bengali, English
- Nirendranath Chakravarty (1924–2018), Bengali
- Vikram Chandra (born 1961), English
- Bankim Chandra Chatterjee (1838–1894), Bengali
- Upamanyu Chatterjee (born 1959), English
- Sharat Chandra Chattopadhyay (1876–1938), Bengali
- Amit Chaudhuri (born 1962), English
- Rajkamal Chaudhary (1929–1967), Hindi
- Jibanananda Das (1899–1954), Bengali
- Manoj Das (1934–2021), Oriya
- David Davidar (born 1958)
- Shobhaa De (born 1948), English
- Anita Desai (born 1937), English
- Kiran Desai (born 1971), English
- P. L. Deshpande (1919–2000) Marathi
- Eunice De Souza (1940–2017), English
- Chitra Banerjee Divakaruni (born 1956)
- Michael Madhusudan Dutta (1824–1873), Bengali, English, French
- Lalon Fakir (c. 1772–1890), Bengali
- Sunil Gangopadhyay (1934–2012), Bengali
- Amitav Ghosh (born 1956), English
- Subodh Ghosh (1909–1980), Bengali
- Mir Mosharraf Hossain (1847–1912) Bengali
- Raj Kamal Jha (born 1966), English
- Amita Kanekar (born 1965), English
- Umar Alisha Kavisekhara (1885–1945), Telugu
- Datta Raghunath Kavthekar (1901–1979), Marathi
- Prakash Kona (born 1967)
- Kuvempu (1904–1994), Kannada
- Jhumpa Lahiri (born 1967)
- Pankaj Mishra (born 1969)
- Piyush Jha (living), English
- Rohinton Mistry (born 1952), English
- Narendranath Mitra (1916–1975), Bengali
- Gopinath Mohanty (1914–1991), Oriya
- Jagadish Mohanty (1951–2013), Odia
- Shirshendu Mukhopadhyay (born 1935), Bengali
- Kiran Nagarkar (1942–2019) Marathi, English
- R. K. Narayan (1906–2001), English
- Bhalchandra Nemade (born 1938), Marathi
- Dibyendu Palit (1939–2019), Bengali, English
- Surender Mohan Pathak (born 1940), Hindi
- Jaishankar Prasad (1889–1937), Hindi
- Munshi Premchand (1880–1936), Hindi
- Tushar Raheja (born 1984), English
- Indra Bahadur Rai (1927–2018) Nepali
- Rajashree, English
- Raja Rao (1908–2006), English
- Satyajit Ray (1921–1992), Bengali
- Arundhati Roy (born 1961), English
- Rammohan Roy (1772–1833), Bengali, English, Sanskrit
- Salman Rushdie (born 1947), English
- Sarojini Sahoo (born 1956) Odia
- Rahul Sankrityayan (1893–1963), Hindi, Bhojpuri, Tibetan, Sanskrit
- Vilas Sarang (1942–2015) Marathi, English
- D. Selvaraj (1938–2009), Tamil
- Samar Sen (1916–1987), Bengali, English
- Fakir Mohan Senapati (1843–1918), Oriya
- Durjoy Datta (born 1987), English
- Vikram Seth (born 1952), author of A Suitable Boy
- Rabindranath Tagore (1861–1941) Bengali also poet, painter, philosopher & Nobel laureate
- Shashi Tharoor (born 1956), English
- Chetan Bhagat (born 1971), English
- Rajeeva Nayan Pathak (born 1972), English
- Ishwar Chandra Vidyasagar (1820–1891) Bengali
- Vijayakrishnan (born 1952), Malayalam
- Kalki Krishnamurthy (1899–1954), Tamil
- Sujatha (1935–2008), Tamil language
- Lakshminath Bezbaroa (1864–1938), Assamese
- Mamoni Raisom Goswami (1942–2011), Assamese, English
- Bhabendra Nath Saikia (1932–2003), Assamese
- Hiren Gohain (born 1939), Assamese
- Nabakanta Barua (1926–2002), Assamese
- Bishnu Prasad Rabha, Assamese
- Kulpreet Yadav (born 1968), English
- M. T. Vasudevan Nair (1933–2024), Malayalam
- Sudha Murthy (born 1950), Kannada, Marathi, English
- Atul Kumar Rai (born 1992), Hindi

== Indonesia ==
- Andrea Hirata (born 1967), Tetralogy of "Laskar Pelangi" (The Rainbow Troops)
- Dewi Lestari (born 1976)
- Pramoedya Ananta Toer (1925–2006), author of the banned 1980 novel This Earth of Mankind

== Iran ==
- Ahmad Mahmoud (1931–2002)
- Azar Nafisi (born 1948)
- Bozorg Alavi (1904–1997)
- Houshang Golshiri (1937–2000)
- Jamal Mirsadeghi
- Mahmud Doulatabadi (born 1940)
- Reza Baraheni (1935–2022)
- Sadegh Hedayat (1903–1951)
- Sadiq Chubak (1916–1998)
- Shahrnush Parsipur (born 1946)
- Simin Daneshvar (1921–2012)
- Zoya Pirzad (born 1952)
- Arash Hejazi (born 1971)
- Abbas Maroufi (1957–2022)
- Shahryar Mandanipour (born 1957)
- Jalal Al-e-Ahmad (1923–1969)

== Iraq ==
- Ahmed Saadawi (born 1973), author of the award-winning Iraqi novel Frankenstein in Baghdad
- Diaa Jubaili (born 1977)
- Fouad al-Tikerly, best known for his novel al-Rajea al-Baeed, translated into English as The Long Way Back
- Haifa Zangana (born 1950), in Baghdad
- Hazim Kamaledin (born 1954), best known for his novel Desertified Waters, translated in Dutch as Schoonheid raast in mij tot ik sterf, longlisted for International Prize for Arabic Fiction
- Ibtisam Abdallah (1942/1943–2023)
- Inaam Kachachi (born 1952)
- Iqbal al-Qazwini
- Samīra al-Māni' (born 1935)
- Samuel Shimon (born 1956)
- Selim Matar
- Sinan Antoon

== Ireland ==
- Samuel Beckett (1906–1989)
- James Joyce (1882–1941)
- Flann O'Brien (1911–1966)
- Oscar Wilde (1854–1900)

== Israel ==
- Shmuel Yosef Agnon (1888–1970), Nobel Prize winner; The Bridal Canopy, Yesteryear
- Aharon Appelfeld (1932–2018), Badenheim 1939
- Naomi Frankel (1918–2009), Shaul ve-Yohannah (Saul and Joanna) trilogy
- David Grossman (born 1954), See Under: Love, The Smile of the Lamb
- Gail Hareven (born 1959)
- Yoram Kaniuk (1930–2013), His Daughter
- Amos Oz (1939–2018), Black Box, My Michael
- Yaakov Shabtai (1934–1981), Past Continuous
- Meir Shalev (1948–2023), The Blue Mountain, Esau
- Michal Govrin (born 1960), The Name, Snapshots
- Chaim Walder (1969–2021), Kids Speak
- Avraham B. Yehoshua (1936–2022), A Late Divorce, Mr. Mani

== Italy ==
- Giulio Angioni (1939–2017)
- Riccardo Bacchelli (1891–1985)
- Alessandro Baricco (born 1958)
- Giorgio Bassani (1916–2000)
- Stefano Benni (1947–2025), journalist, poet, novelist, Terra (1985) is most popular work in English
- Alberto Bevilacqua (1934–2013)
- Vitaliano Brancati (1907–1954)
- Gesualdo Bufalino (1920–1996)
- Aldo Busi (born 1948)
- Dino Buzzati (1906–1972), Il deserto dei Tartari (1940)
- Italo Calvino (1923–1985), Cosmicomics, If On a Winter's Night a Traveler (1979)
- Luigi Capuana (1839–1915)
- Andrea Camilleri (1925–2019)
- Carlo Cassola (1917–1987)
- Saveria Chemotti (born 1947)
- Carlo Collodi (1826–1890)
- Carmen Covito (born 1948)
- Gabriele D'Annunzio (1863–1938)
- Massimo D'Azeglio (1798–1866)
- Edmondo De Amicis (1846–1908)
- Grazia Deledda (1871–1936)
- Umberto Eco (1932–2016)
- Elena Ferrante
- Beppe Fenoglio (né Giuseppe)
- Antonio Fogazzaro (1842–1911)
- Carlo Emilio Gadda (1893–1973)
- Natalia Ginzburg (1916–1991)
- Primo Levi (1919–1987)
- Emilio Lussu (1890–1975)
- Alessandro Manzoni (1785–1873)
- Dacia Maraini (born 1936)
- Franco Mimmi (born 1942)
- Elsa Morante (1912–1985)
- Alberto Moravia (1907–1990)
- Goffredo Parise (1929–1986)
- Cesare Pavese (1908–1950)
- Luigi Pirandello (1867–1936), playwright, Six Characters in Search of an Author
- Vasco Pratolini (1913–1991)
- Andrea di Robilant (born 1957)
- Emilio Salgari (1862–1911)
- Alberto Savinio (1891–1952)
- Leonardo Sciascia (1921–1989)
- Ignazio Silone (1900–1978)
- Mario Soldati (1906–1999)
- Italo Svevo (1861–1928)
- Antonio Tabucchi (1943–2012), Pereira Declares (1994)
- Susanna Tamaro (born 1957)
- Giuseppe Tomasi di Lampedusa (1896–1957), The Leopard
- Giovanni Verga (1840–1922)
- Elio Vittorini (1908–1966)

== Jamaica ==
- Opal Palmer Adisa (born 1954)
- Lindsay Barrett (born 1941)
- Edward Baugh (1936–2023)
- James Berry (1924–2017)
- Eliot Bliss (1903–1990)
- Erna Brodber (born 1940)
- Colin Channer (born 1963)
- Kwame Dawes (born 1962)
- Jean D'Costa (born 1937)
- Nicole Dennis-Benn (born 1982)
- John Hearne (1926–1994)
- Nalo Hopkinson (born 1960)
- Herbert de Lisser (1878–1944)
- Roger Mais (1905–1955)
- Claude McKay (1889–1948)
- Pamela Mordecai (born 1942)
- Geoffrey Philp (born 1958)
- Velma Pollard (1937–2025)
- Patricia Powell (born 1966)
- Victor Stafford Reid (1913–1987)
- Joan Riley (born 1958)
- Leone Ross (born 1969)
- Andrew Salkey (1928–1995)
- Olive Senior (born 1941)
- Makeda Silvera (born 1955)
- Elean Thomas (1947–2004)
- Sylvia Wynter (born 1928)

== Japan ==
- Kōbō Abe (1924–1993)
- Hiroyuki Agawa (1920–2015)
- Sawako Ariyoshi (1931–1984)
- Osamu Dazai (1909–1948)
- Fumiko Enchi (1905–1986)
- Shusaku Endo (1923–1996)
- Ichiyō Higuchi (1872–1896)
- Masuji Ibuse (1898–1993)
- Kyōka Izumi (1873–1939)
- Yasunari Kawabata (1899–1972) (Nobel Prize, 1968)
- Natsuo Kirino (born 1951)
- Yukio Mishima (1925–1970)
- Kenji Miyazawa (1896–1933)
- Minae Mizumura (born 1951)
- Haruki Murakami (born 1949)
- Ryū Murakami
- Nisioisin (born 1981)
- Kenzaburō Ōe (1935–2023) (Nobel Prize, 1994)
- Yōko Ogawa (born 1962)
- Fuyumi Ono (born 1961)
- Edogawa Rampo (1894–1965)
- Hirotsu Ryurō (1861–1928)
- Murasaki Shikibu
- Junzo Shono (1921–2009)
- Ayako Sono (1931–2025)
- Natsume Sōseki (1867–1916)
- Jun'ichirō Tanizaki (1886–1965)
- Shōtarō Yasuoka (1920–2013)
- Banana Yoshimoto (born 1964)
- Akira Yoshimura (1927–2006)
- Junnosuke Yoshiyuki (1924–1994)
- Ryūnosuke Akutagawa (1892–1927)

== Kenya ==
- Margaret Ogola (1958–2011)
- Grace Ogot (1930–2015)
- M. G. Vassanji (born 1950)
- Ngũgĩ wa Thiong'o (1938–2025), The River Between, Caitaani muthara-Ini, Matigari
- Meja Mwangi (1948–2025)
- Isak Dinesen, pseudonym of Karen Blixen (1885–1962)

== Kosovo ==
- Xhevdet Bajraj
- Pjetër Bogdani
- Ali Podrimja
- Azem Shkreli

== Turkey (Kurds) ==
- Bachtyar Ali (born 1960)
- Jalal Barzanji (born 1953)
- Yaşar Kemal (1923–2015)
- Ata Nahai
- Farhad Pirbal (born 1961)
- Mehmed Uzun (1953–2007)

== Latvia ==
- Andrejs Upīts (1877–1970)
- Marģeris Zariņš (1910–1993)
- Aleksandrs Čaks (1901–1950)

== Laos ==
- Douangdeuane Bounyavong
- Outhine Bounyavong
- Daoviang Butnakho

== Lebanon ==
- Hanan al-Shaykh (born 1945)
- Youssef Howayek (1883–1962), writer and sculptor
- Elias Khoury (1948–2024)
- Amin Maalouf (born 1949)
- Widad Sakakini (1913–1991)

== Lesotho ==
- Thomas Mofolo (1876–1948)

== Republic of Macedonia ==
- Slavko Janevski (1920–2000)

== Madagascar ==
- Michèle Rakotoson (born 1948)
- Jean-Joseph Rabearivelo (1901 or 1903–1937)

== Malawi ==
- Paul Tiyambe Zeleza (born 1955)
- Felix Mnthali (born 1933)

== Malaysia ==
- K. S. Maniam (1942–2020)

== Mali ==
- Amadou Hampâté Bâ (1901–1991)
- Aïda Mady Diallo
- Doumbi Fakoly (1944–2024)
- Moussa Konaté (1951–2013)
- Yambo Ouologuem (1940–2017)

== Mauritania ==
- Moussa Ould Ebnou (born 1956)

== Mexico ==
- Juan José Arreola
- Nellie Campobello
- Laura Esquivel
- Carlos Fuentes
- Elena Garro
- Martín Luis Guzmán
- José Emilio Pacheco
- Octavio Paz
- Juan Rulfo
- Agustin Yanez
- Jorge Ibargüengoitia
- Homero Aridjis

== Morocco ==
- Mohamed Choukri (1935–2003)
- Driss Chraïbi (1926–2007)
- Edmond Amran El Maleh (1917–2010)
- Abdelkebir Khatibi (1938–2009)
- Mohammed Khaïr-Eddine (1941–1995)
- Laila Lalami (born 1968)
- Ahmed Sefrioui (1915–13 July 2004)
- Mohamed Zafzaf (1945–2001)
- Mohamed Leftah (1946–2008)

== Mozambique ==
- Paulina Chiziane (born 1955)
- Mia Couto (born 1955)
- Ungulani Ba Ka Khosa (born 1957)
- Lina Magaia (1940–2011)

== Nepal ==
- Bishweshwar Prasad Koirala (1914–1982): Sumnima, Tin Ghumti, Hitlar Ra Yahudi.
- Indra Bahadur Rai
- Jagadish Ghimire (1946–2013): Lilam, Sabiti.
- Khagendra Sangraula (born 1946): Chetanako Pahilo Dak, Amako Chhatapati, Junakiriko Sangit.
- Laxmi Prasad Devkota (1909–1959)
- Narayan Wagle
- Parijat (writer) (1937–1993): Shirishko Phool (Blue Mimosa), Anido Pahadsangai, Paribhasit Ankhanharu.
- Samrat Upadhyay
- Sanu Sharma
- Sarubhakta (born 1956)
- Shrawan Mukarung
- Subin Bhattarai (born 1982)

== Netherlands ==
- Ayaan Hirsi Ali (born 1969)
- Harry Mulisch (1927–2010)
- Multatuli (1820–1887)
- Tip Marugg (1923–2006)
- Cees Nooteboom (born 1933)
- Willem Frederik Hermans (1921–1995)
- Jan Wolkers (1925–2007)
- Gerard van het Reve (1923–2006)
- A.F.Th. van der Heijden (born 1951)

== New Zealand ==
- Barbara Anderson (1926–2013)
- Catherine Chidgey (born 1970)
- Joy Cowley (born 1936)
- Nigel Cox (1951–2006)
- Barry Crump (1935–1996)
- Tessa Duder (born 1940)
- Alan Duff (born 1950)
- Kate Duignan (born 1974)
- Janet Frame (1924–2004), author of An Angel at My Table
- Maurice Gee (1931–2025)
- Patricia Grace (born 1937)
- Keri Hulme (1947–2021)
- Witi Ihimaera (born 1944)
- Annamarie Jagose (born 1965)
- Fiona Kidman (born 1940)
- John A. Lee (1891–1982)
- Ngaio Marsh (1895–1982)
- Owen Marshall (born 1941)
- Frederick Edward Maning (1812–1883)
- Ronald Hugh Morrieson (1922–1972)
- Rosie Scott (1948–2017)
- Maurice Shadbolt (1932–2004)
- C. K. Stead (born 1932)
- Philip Temple (born 1939)
- Julius Vogel (1835–1899)
- Cherry Wilder (1930–2002)

== Nicaragua ==
- Gioconda Belli (born 1948)

== Nigeria ==
- Chinua Achebe (1930–2013)
- Chimamanda Ngozi Adichie (born 1977)
- Teju Cole (born 1975)
- Cyprian Ekwensi (1921–2007)
- Buchi Emecheta (1944–2017)
- Helon Habila (born 1967)
- Elnathan John (born 1982)
- Flora Nwapa (1931–1993)
- Chigozie Obioma (born 1986)
- Ben Okri (born 1959)
- Ken Saro-Wiwa (1941–1995)
- Taiye Selasi (born 1979)
- Lola Shoneyin (born 1974)
- Wole Soyinka (born 1934)
- Amos Tutuola (1920–1997)

== Norway ==
- Ingvar Ambjørnsen (1956–2025)
- Jens Bjørneboe (1920–1976)
- Bjørnstjerne Bjørnson (1832–1910)
- Johan Borgen (1902–1979)
- Lars Saabye Christensen (born 1953)
- Olav Duun (1876–1939)
- Johan Falkberget (1879–1967)
- Jostein Gaarder (born 1952), Sophie's World
- Erik Fosnes Hansen (born 1965)
- Knut Hamsun (1859–1952), Hunger
- Sigurd Hoel (1890–1960)
- Roy Jacobsen (1954–2025)
- Alexander Kielland (1849–1906)
- Jan Kjærstad (born 1953)
- Karl Ove Knausgård (born 1968)
- Jonas Lie (1833–1908)
- Erlend Loe (born 1969)
- Gabriel Scott (1874–1958)
- Dag Solstad (1941–2025)
- Sigrid Undset (1859–1952), Kristin Lavransdatter
- Tarjei Vesaas (1897–1970)
- Herbjørg Wassmo (born 1942)

== Pakistan ==
- Ahmed Ali, founder of Pakistan Academy of Letters, fiction writer, poet and scholar
- Chaudhry Afzal Haq (1891–1942)
- Tariq Ali (born 1943)
- Musharraf Ali Farooqi (born 1968)
- Zulfikar Ghose (1935–2022)
- Mohsin Hamid (born 1971)
- Agha Shorish Kashmiri (1917–1975)
- Saadat Hasan Manto (1912–1955), born in India
- Ali Akbar Natiq (born 1974)
- Uzma Aslam Khan
- Kamila Shamsie (born 1973)
- Bapsi Sidhwa (1938–2024)
- Abdullah Hussain (1920–2014)
- Intizar Hussain (1923–2016)
- Janbaz Mirza
- Mustansar Hussain Tarar (born 1939)
- Bano Qudsia (1928–2017)
- Ashfaq Ahmed (1925–2004)
- Mumtaz Mufti (1905–1995)
- Naseem Hijazi (c. 1914–1996)
- Ibn-e-Safi (1928–1980)
- Ishtiaq Ahmed (c. 1941–2015)

== Palestine ==
- Ghassan Kanafani (1936–1972)
- Mahmoud Darwish (1941–2008)
- Susan Abulhawa (born 1970)

== Paraguay ==
- Renée Ferrer de Arréllaga (born 1944)
- Augusto Roa Bastos (1917–2005)

== Peru ==
- Ciro Alegría (1909–1967)
- José María Arguedas (1911–1969)
- Manuel Scorza (1928–1983)
- Carlos Thorne (1923–2021)
- Mario Vargas Llosa (1936–2025) (Nobel Prize, 2010)

== Philippines ==
- Francisco Arcellana (1916–2002)
- Lualhati Bautista (1945–2023)
- Carlos Bulosan (1913–1956)
- Jose Dalisay (born 1954)
- Eric Gamalinda (born 1956)
- N. V. M. Gonzalez (1915–1999)
- Jessica Hagedorn (born 1949)
- Amado Hernandez (1903–1970)
- Stevan Javellana (1918–1977)
- Nick Joaquin (1917–2004)
- Arius Raposas (born 1996)
- Edgardo Reyes (1936–2012)
- José Rizal (1861–1896)
- Ninotchka Rosca (born 1946)
- Bienvenido Santos (1911–1996)
- Lope K. Santos (1879–1963)
- Rogelio Sicat (1940–1997)
- F. Sionil José (1924–2022)
- Edilberto Tiempo (1913–1996)
- Edith Tiempo (1919–2011)
- Linda Ty-Casper (born 1931)

== Poland ==
- Maria Dąbrowska (1889–1965)
- Tadeusz Dołęga-Mostowicz (1898–1939)
- Tadeusz Konwicki (1926–2015)
- Ignacy Krasicki (1735–1801)
- Józef Ignacy Kraszewski (1812–1887)
- Zofia Nałkowska (1885–1954)
- Witold Gombrowicz (1904–1969)
- Stanisław Lem (1921–2006)
- Eliza Orzeszkowa (1841–1910)
- Jan Potocki (1761–1815)
- Bolesław Prus (1847–1912)
- Władysław Reymont (1867–1925), Nobel Prize for Literature 1924, author of The Peasants
- Bruno Schulz (1892–1942)
- Henryk Sienkiewicz (1846–1916), Nobel Prize for Literature 1905, author of Quo Vadis
- Olga Tokarczuk (born 1962)
- Gabriela Zapolska (1857–1921)
- Stefan Żeromski (1864–1925)
- Eugeniusz Żytomirski (1911–1975)

== Portugal ==
- Agustina Bessa-Luís (1922–2019)
- Camilo Castelo Branco (1825–1890)
- Júlio Dinis (1839–1871)
- Almeida Garrett (1799–1854)
- Alexandre Herculano (1810–1877)
- António Lobo Antunes (1942–2026)
- José Cardoso Pires (1925–1998)
- Eça de Queirós (1845–1900)
- José Saramago (1922–2010)
- Luís de Camões

== Puerto Rico ==
- Giannina Braschi (born 1953), Yo-Yo Boing! (1998), and El imperio de los suenos/Empire of Dreams (1988).
- Luis López Nieves (born 1950), Seva (1984), Escribir para Rafa (1987), La verdadera muerte de Juan Ponce de León (2000), El corazón de Voltaire (2005)

== Romania ==
- Ion Agârbiceanu (1882–1963)
- Gabriela Adameșteanu (born 1942)
- Dimitrie Bolintineanu (1819 (1825 according to some sources) – 1872)
- Camil Baciu (1926–2005)
- Maria Baciu (born 1942)
- Eugen Barbu (1924–1993)
- Max Blecher (1909–1938)
- Eugeniu Botez (1874–1933)
- Nicolae Breban (born 1934)
- Augustin Buzura (1938–2017)
- Mateiu Caragiale (1885–1936)
- George Călinescu (1899–1965)
- Mircea Cărtărescu (born 1956)
- Constantin Chiriță (1925–1991)
- Gheorghe Crăciun (1950–2007)
- Ion Creangă (1837–1889)
- Mircea Eliade (1907–1986)
- Mihai Eminescu (1850–1889)
- Nicolae Filimon (1819–1865)
- Dumitru Găleșanu (born 1955)
- Radu Pavel Gheo (born 1969)
- Virgil Gheorghiu (1916–1992)
- Anton Holban (1902–1937)
- Garabet Ibrăileanu (1871–1936)
- Panait Istrati (1884–1935)
- Alexandru Ivasiuc (1894–1935)
- Eugen Lovinescu (1881–1943)
- Norman Manea (born 1936)
- Gib Mihăescu (1894–1935)
- Ion Minulescu (1881–1944)
- Herta Müller (born 1953)
- Gellu Naum (1915–2001)
- Mircea Nedelciu (1950–1999)
- Costache Negruzzi (1808–1868)
- Hortensia Papadat-Bengescu (1876–1955)
- Dora Pavel (born 1946)
- Camil Petrescu (1894–1957)
- Cezar Petrescu (1892–1961)
- Dumitru Radu Popescu (1935–2023)
- Marin Preda (1922–1980)
- Liviu Rebreanu (1885–1944)
- Doina Ruști (born 1957)
- Mihail Sadoveanu (1880–1961)
- Cella Serghi (1907–1992)
- Mihail Sebastian (1907–1945)
- Ioan Slavici (1848–1925)
- Zaharia Stancu (1902–1974)
- Bogdan Suceavă (born 1969)
- Ionel Teodoreanu (1897–1954)
- Radu Tudoran (1910–1992)
- Duiliu Zamfirescu (1858–1922)

== Russia ==
- Andrey Bely (1880–1934)
- Andrey Bitov (1937–2018)
- Mikhail Bulgakov (1891–1940), author of The Master and Margarita
- Nikolai Chernyshevsky (1828–1889), author of What Is To Be Done?
- Fyodor Dostoyevsky (1821–1881), author of The Brothers Karamazov, Crime and Punishment
- Gaito Gazdanov (1903–1971)
- Nikolai Gogol (1809–1852), author of Dead Souls
- Ivan Goncharov (1812–1891), Oblomov, a tale of a "superfluous" man
- Maxim Gorky (1868–1936)
- Anna Kashina, author of The Princess of Dhagabad
- Mikhail Lermontov (1814–1841)
- Leonid Leonov (1899–1994)
- Nikolai Leskov (1831–1895)
- Vladimir Makanin (1937–2017)
- Vladimir Nabokov (1899–1977) early novels in Russian, later, including Lolita, in English.
- Boris Pasternak (1890–1960), refused the Nobel Prize for Literature, Doctor Zhivago
- Aleksandr Pushkin (1799–1837)
- Mikhail Saltykov-Shchedrin (1826–1889)
- Ilia Shtemler (1933–2022)
- Aleksandr Solzhenitsyn (1918–2008), One Day in the Life of Ivan Denisovich
- Aleksey K. Tolstoy (1817–1875)
- Aleksey N. Tolstoy (1883–1945)
- Leo Tolstoy (1828–1910), author of War and Peace, Anna Karenina
- Ivan Turgenev (1818–1883)

== Saint Vincent and the Grenadines ==
- Phyllis Joyce McClean Punnett (1917–2004)

== Samoa ==
- Sia Figiel (1967–2026)
- Albert Wendt (born 1939)

== São Tomé and Príncipe ==
- Sara Pinto Coelho (1913–1990)

== Serbia ==
- David Albahari (1948–2023)
- Ivo Andrić (1892–1975)
- Vladimir Arsenijević (born 1965)
- Miodrag Bulatović (1930–1991)
- Miloš Crnjanski (1893–1977)
- Dobrica Ćosić (1921–2014)
- Jelena Dimitrijević (1862–1945)
- Danilo Kiš (1935–1989)
- Milorad Pavić (1929–2009)
- Borislav Pekić (1930–1992)
- Isidora Sekulić (1877–1958)
- Meša Selimović (1910–1982)
- Srđan Srdić (born 1977)
- Svetlana Velmar-Janković (1933–2014)

== Sierra Leone ==
- Syl Cheney-Coker (born 1945)
- Aminatta Forna (born 1964)
- Namina Forna (born 1987)

== Somalia ==
- Maxamed Daahir Afrax
- Faarax M. J. Cawl (1937–1991)
- Nuruddin Farah (born 1945)
- Abdi Sheik Abdi (born 1942)
- Waris Dirie (born 1965)

== South Africa ==
- Lionel Abrahams (1928–2004)
- Peter Abrahams (1919–2017)
- Elleke Boehmer (born 1961)
- J. M. Coetzee (born 1940)
- K. Sello Duiker (1974–2005)
- Athol Fugard (1932–2025)
- Damon Galgut (born 1963)
- Nadine Gordimer (1923–2014)
- Bessie Head (1937–1986)
- Christopher Hope (born 1944)
- Cynthia Jele (living)
- Fred Khumalo (born 1966)
- Alex La Guma (1925–1985)
- Mandla Langa (born 1950)
- Christine Barkhuizen le Roux (1959–2020)
- Arthur Maimane (1932–2005)
- Zakes Mda (born 1948)
- Kirsten Miller (born 1973)
- Lauretta Ngcobo (1931–2015)
- Lewis Nkosi (1936–2010)
- Alan Paton (1903–1988)
- Olive Schreiner (1855–1920)
- Sipho Sepamla (1932–2007)
- Gillian Slovo (born 1952)
- Zukiswa Wanner (born 1976)
- Zoë Wicomb (1948–2025)

== Spain ==
- Maria Dolores Acevedo
- Leopoldo Alas (1852–1901)
- Jesusa Alfau Galván de Solalinde (1895–1943)
- Núria Añó (born 1973)
- Elísabet Benavent (born 1984)
- Teresa Cameselle (born 1968)
- Camilo José Cela (1916–2002)
- Miguel de Cervantes (1547–1616), Don Quixote
- Matilde Cherner (1833–1880)
- Trini de Figueroa (1918–1972), Spanish romance novelist
- Pérez Galdós (1843–1920)
- Concepción Gimeno de Flaquer (1850–1919)
- Juan Goytisolo (1931–2017)
- Carmela Gutiérrez de Gambra (1921–1984), Spanish scholar, translator, romance novelist, Christian feminist
- Javier Marías (1951–2022)
- Juan Marsé (1933–2020)
- Marina Mayoral (born 1942)
- Eduardo Mendoza (born 1943)
- Antonio Muñoz Molina (born 1956)
- Arturo Pérez-Reverte (born 1951)
- Carlos Ruiz Zafón (born 1964)
- Francisca Sarasate (1853–1922)
- María del Pilar Sinués de Marco (1835–1893)
- Sara Torres (born 1991)
- Miguel de Unamuno (1864–1936)
- Marika Vila (born 1949)

== Sri Lanka ==
- Gunadasa Amarasekara (born 1929)
- Anuk Arudpragasam (born 1988)
- Arthur C. Clarke (1917–2008)
- Romesh Gunesekera (born 1954)
- Karunasena Jayalath (1928–1994)
- Shehan Karunatilaka (born 1975)
- Rosalind Mendis (1903–1992)
- Carl Muller (1935–2019)
- Simon Navagattegama (1940–2005)
- Michael Ondaatje (born 1943), The English Patient
- Shyam Selvadurai (born 1965)
- W. A. Silva (1890–1957)
- S. J. Sindu (born 1987)
- Ambalavaner Sivanandan (1923–2018)
- Martin Wickremasinghe (1890–1976)

== Sudan ==
- Leila Aboulela (born 1964)
- Ibrahim Ishaq (1946–2021)
- Rania Mamoun
- Ra'ouf Mus'ad, also connected with Egypt
- Tayeb Salih (1929–2009)
- Sabah Sanhouri (born 1990)

== Sweden ==
- Stig Dagerman (1923–1954)
- Marianne Fredriksson (1927–2007)
- Gustaf Fröding (1860–1911)
- Erik Gustaf Geijer (1783–1847)
- Jan Guillou (born 1944)
- Eyvind Johnson (1900–1976)
- Pär Lagerkvist (1891–1974)
- Selma Lagerlöf (1858–1940), Nobel Prize for Literature 1909, author of The Wonderful Adventures of Nils (novel), The Emperor of Portugallia
- Astrid Lindgren (1907–2002)
- Henning Mankell (1948–2015)
- Harry Martinson (1904–1978)
- Vilhelm Moberg (1898–1973)
- Peter Pohl (born 1940)
- Hjalmar Söderberg (1869–1941)
- Esaias Tegnér

== Switzerland ==
- Friedrich Dürrenmatt (1921–1990), The Quarry
- Max Frisch (1911–1991), Stiller (1954) (I'm Not Stiller), Mein Name sei Gantenbein (1964)
- Christian Kracht (born 1966)

== Republic of China|Taiwan ==
- Pai Hsien-yung (born 1937)
- Sanmao (1943–1991)

== Tanzania ==
- Mark Behr, also connected with South Africa (1963–2015)
- Nahida Esmail
- Euphrase Kezilahabi (1944–2020)
- Aniceti Kitereza (1896–1981)
- Abdulrazak Gurnah (born 1948)
- Peter K. Palangyo (1939–1993)
- Gabriel Ruhumbika (born 1938)
- Edwin Semzaba

== Togo ==
- Jeannette D. Ahonsou (born 1954)
- Gad Ami
- Theo Ananissoh (born 1962)
- David Ananou (1917–2000)
- Richard Dogbeh, also connected with Benin, Senegal and Ivory Coast (1932–2003)
- Kossi Efoui (born 1962)
- Christiane Akoua Ekué (born 1954)

== Trinidad and Tobago ==
- André Alexis (born 1957)
- Lisa Allen-Agostini (born 1960s)
- Michael Anthony (1930–2023)
- Robert Antoni (born 1958)
- Dionne Brand (born 1953)
- Ralph de Boissière (1907–2008)
- Ramabai Espinet (born 1948)
- Rosa Guy (1922–2012)
- Merle Hodge (born 1944)
- Kevin Jared Hosein (born 1986)
- C. L. R. James (1901–1989)
- Barbara Jenkins
- Marion Patrick Jones (1931–2016)
- Anthony Joseph (born 1966)
- Earl Lovelace (born 1935)
- Shiva Naipaul (1945–1985)
- V. S. Naipaul (1932–2018)
- Elizabeth Nunez (1944–2024)
- Lakshmi Persaud (1937–2024)
- M. NourbeSe Philip (born 1947)
- Monique Roffey (born 1965)
- Lawrence Scott (born 1943)
- Samuel Selvon (1923–1994)
- Elizabeth Walcott-Hackshaw (born 1964)

== Tunisia ==
- Hédi Bouraoui (born 1932)
- Aïcha Chaibi
- Faten Fazaâ
- Sophie el Goulli (1932–2015)
- Hubert Haddad (born 1947)
- Khawla Hamdi (born 1984)
- Albert Memmi (1920–2020)
- Amel Mokhtar (born 1964)
- Mustapha Tlili (1937–2017)

== Turkey ==
- Ahmet Hamdi Tanpınar, author of Saatleri Ayarlama Enstitüsü, Huzur
- Ahmet Ümit, author of Beyoğlu Rapsodisi
- Ayşe Kulin (born 1941)
- Aziz Nesin (1915–1995)
- Buket Uzuner (born 1955)
- Elif Şafak (born 1971)
- Haldun Taner (1915–1986)
- Halit Ziya Uşaklıgil, author of Mai ve Siyah, Aşkı Memnu
- Hasan Ali Toptaş (born 1958)
- Kemal Tahir, author of Yorgun Savaşçı, Devlet Ana, Karılar Koğuşu
- Metin Kaçan (1961–2013)
- Oğuz Atay (1934–1977), author of Tutunamayanlar
- Oktay Rifat (1914–1988)
- Orhan Kemal (1923–2015), author of Bekçi Murtaza,
- Orhan Pamuk, Nobel Prize author of My Name Is Red and The White Castle
- Reşat Nuri Güntekin (1889–1956)
- Rıfat Ilgaz (1911–1993)
- Sabahattin Ali (1907–1948), author of Kuyucaklı Yusuf, Kürk Mantolu Madonna
- Sevim Burak (1931–1983)
- Sabri Gürses (born 1972)
- Yahya Kemal (1884–1958)
- Yaşar Kemal (1923–2015), author of Mehmed, My Hawk
- Yunus Nadi Abalıoğlu (1879–1945)
- Yusuf Atilgan, author of Anayurt Oteli, Aylak Adam

== Uganda ==
- Jane Bakaluba (born 1939)
- Violet Barungi (born 1943)
- Dilman Dila
- Arthur Gakwandi
- Moses Isegawa (born 1963)
- Godfrey Kalimugogo (1943–2015)
- Catherine Samali Kavuma (born 1960)
- China Keitetsi (born 1976)
- Goretti Kyomuhendo (born 1965)
- Bonnie Lubega (born 1929)
- Jennifer Nansubuga Makumbi (born 1960s)
- Ivan Matthias Mulumba
- Glaydah Namukasa
- Julius Ocwinyo (born 1961)
- Kakwenza Rukirabashaija (born 1988)
- Eneriko Seruma (born 1944)
- Lillian Tindyebwa
- Nick Twinamatsiko
- Timothy Wangusa (born 1942)

== Ukraine ==
- Larisa Alexandrovna Horton (born 1971)
- Emma Andijewska (born 1931)
- Eugenia Chuprina (born 1971)
- Markiyan Kamysh (born 1988
- Andrey Kurkov (born 1961)
- Yaroslav Melnyk (born 1959)
- Israel Orenstein (1831–1905)
- Halyna Pahutiak (born 1958)
- Mykhailo Stelmakh (1912–1983)
- Serhiy Zhadan (born 1974)

== United Kingdom ==
=== Wales ===
==== English language ====
- Mary Balogh (born 1944)
- Amy Dillwyn (1845–1935)
- Ken Follett (born 1949)
- Richard Hughes (1900–1976), A High Wind in Jamaica
- Jack Jones (1884–1970)
- Richard Llewellyn (1907–1983), How Green Was My Valley
- Stephen Maybery (1949–2020)
- Jean Rhys (1890–1979)
- Bernice Rubens (1923–2004), author of A Solitary Grief
- Howard Spring (1889–1965)

==== Welsh language ====
- Daniel Owen (1836–1895)
- Eigra Lewis Roberts (born 1939)
- Kate Roberts (1891–1985)

=== Northern Ireland ===
- Colin Bateman (born 1962), Divorcing Jack
- Ronan Bennett (born 1956), The Catastrophist
- Joyce Cary (1888–1957), The Horse's Mouth
- Paul Kearney (born 1967), Monarchies of God
- Benedict Kiely (1919–2007)
- Bernard MacLaverty (born 1942), Cal
- Brian Moore (1921–1999), The Lonely Passion of Judith Hearne
- Flann O'Brien (1911–1966), The Third Policeman
- Amanda McKittrick Ross (1860–1939)

== Uruguay ==
- Eduardo Galeano (1940–2015), writer and social commentator.
- Mario Benedetti (1920–2009), Uruguay's best-known novelist
- Jorge Majfud (born 1969)
- Juan Carlos Onetti (1909–1997)
- Horacio Quiroga (1878–1937)
- Juana de Ibarbourou (1892–1979)
- Maria Eugenia Vaz Ferreira (1875–1924)
- Delmira Agustini (1886–1914)
- Isidore Lucien Ducasse (1846–1870), born in Montevideo though French by nationality
- José Enrique Rodó (1871–1917), considered by many to have been Spanish America's greatest philosopher

== Venezuela ==
- Alfredo Armas Alfonzo (1921–1990)
- Rufino Blanco Fombona (1874–1944)
- Mario Briceño Iragorry (1897–1958)
- Manuel Díaz Rodríguez (1871–1927)
- Alicia Freilich (born 1939)
- Rómulo Gallegos (1884–1969)
- Salvador Garmendia (1928–2001)
- Adriano González León (1931–2008)
- Francisco Herrera Luque (1927–1991)
- Boris Izaguirre (born 1965)
- Eduardo Liendo (1941–2025)
- Francisco Massiani (1944–2019)
- Guillermo Meneses (1911–1978)
- Miguel Otero Silva (1908–1985)
- Julián Padrón (1910–1964)
- Teresa de la Parra (1889–1936)
- Karina Sainz Borgo (born 1982)
- Mariano Picón Salas (1901–1965)
- Arturo Uslar Pietri (1906–2001)

== Vietnam ==
- Dương Thu Hương (born 1947) Paradise of the Blind
- Pham Thi Hoai (born 1960)
- Phung Le Ly Hayslip (born 1949) When Heaven and Earth Changed Places
- Bao Ninh (born 1952)

== Yiddish ==
- Sholom Asch (1880–1957)
- David Bergelson (1884–1952)
- Der Nister (1884–1950)
- Shira Gorshman (1906–2001)
- Chaim Grade (1910–1982)
- Esther Kreitman (1891–1954)
- Mendele Moykher Sforim (1836–1917), pseudonym for Sholem Yankev Abramovitch
- Joseph Opatoshu (1886–1954)
- Yitzok Lebesh Peretz (1852–1915)
- Sholem Aleichem (1859–1916) (real name: Solomon Rabinovitz), Fiddler on the Roof was based on his stories
- Isaac Bashevis Singer (1904–1991)
- Israel Joshua Singer (1893–1944)
- Anzia Yezierska (c. 1880–1970)

== Zimbabwe ==
- Tsitsi Dangarembga (born 1959)
- Chenjerai Hove (1956–2015)
- Doris Lessing, born in Persia, now Iran (1919–2013)
- Dambudzo Marechera (1952–1987)
- Nozipa Maraire (born 1966)
- Charles Mungoshi (1947–2019)
- Solomon Mutswairo (1924–2005)
- Alexander McCall Smith, also connected with Botswana (born 1948)
- Stanlake Samkange (1922–1988)
- Yvonne Vera, also connected with Canada (1964–2005)
