= Oscar Gómez =

Oscar or Óscar Gómez may refer to:

- Óscar Rendoll Gómez (born 1916), Chilean football manager
- Óscar Gómez Sánchez (1934–2008), Peruvian footballer
- Oscar R. Gómez (born 1956), Argentine writer, psychoanalyst and academic researcher
- Óscar Gómez Barbero (born 1961), corporate director of Information Systems at RENFE, the Spanish state railways
- Oscar Gómez (boxer) (born 1975), Argentine boxer
- Óscar Freire Gómez (born 1976), a former Spanish road bicycle racer
- Oscar Gomez (activist) (died 1994) Mexican-American student activist
