= Honeymoon for Three =

Honeymoon for Three may refer to:

- A Honeymoon for Three, a 1910 short starring J. Warren Kerrigan
- Honeymoon for Three (1915 film), a British comedy directed by Maurice Elvey
- Honeymoon for Three (1935 film), a British musical featuring Stanley Lupino
- Honeymoon for Three (1941 film), an American romantic comedy starring Ann Sheridan and George Brent
- Honeymoon for Three (novel), a 1975 novel by Ugandan novelist Jane Bakaluba

== See also ==
- Three on a Honeymoon (disambiguation)
