= Kavthekar =

Kavthekar is a toponymic Maharashtra surname used by people from Kavthe. Notable people with the surname include:

- Amit Kavthekar (born 1984), Maharashtra musician
- Datta Raghunath Kavthekar (1901–1979), Maharashtra novelist
