= Punnett =

Punnett is an English surname. Notable people with the surname include:

- Ian Punnett (born 1960), American radio broadcaster, author, professor, and Episcopal deacon
- Phyllis Joyce McClean Punnett (1917–2004), Vincentian musician and writer
- Reginald Punnett (1875–1967), British geneticist
