= Bakaluba =

Bakaluba is a surname. Notable people with the surname include:

- Jane Bakaluba (born 1939), Ugandan novelist
- Bakaluba Mukasa Peter, member of the eighth Parliament of Uganda (2006–2011)
