= Himerius (disambiguation) =

Himerius (variants include Himerios, Imerius, Imerio, Imier, Immer) can refer to:

- Himerius (c. 315 – c. 386), Bithynian philosopher
- Himerius of Tarragona (fl. 385), archbishop of Tarragona (Spain)
- Himerios (admiral) (fl. 900–920), Byzantine admiral and statesman
- A fictional character in the novel series Monarchies of God by Paul Kearney
- Christian saints:
  - Himerius of Immertal (c. 570 – c. 620)
  - Himerius of Cremona (d. c. 560)
  - Himerius of Bosto (fl. c. 11th century)
  - Saint Camelianus (also called Himerius), bishop of Troyes (479–536 or 511–525)
