= Vav Literary Award =

Vav Literary Award (Persian: جایزه ادبی واو) is an Iranian literary award given annually since 2003 to Persian novels published in Iran. It is an independent award and honors two novels with the most different narrative and structure. The president of the award has been Faeze Seyed Shakeri from 2003. The award has three categories, "Best Novel", "The Novel Worth Honoring" and "Best Publisher". The first award went to Mahmoud Dowlatabadi for Solook (Persian: سُلوک), but he gave his award to the second winner.

== Winners ==
Vav Literary Award
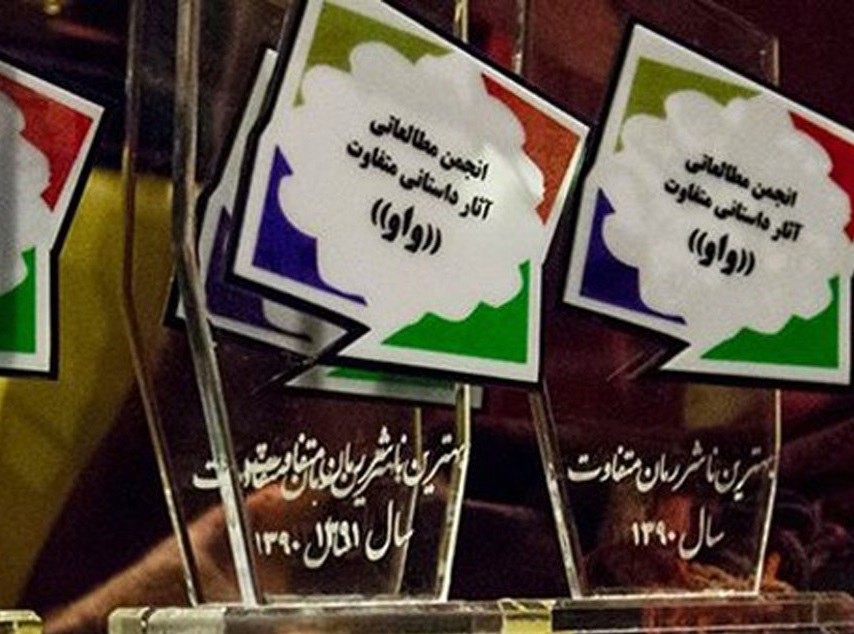
- Awarded for: Narrative and structural difference
- Location: Tehran, Iran
- First award: 2003

11th For works published in 2013.

- Best Novel: Shadow and Stone, Mohammad Reza Safdari
- The Novel Worth Honoring: What Century is My Mood?, Atosa Zarnegar
- Best Publisher: Qoqnoos Publication

12th For works published in 2014.

- Best Novel: Elephants, Shahrokh Giva
- The Novel Worth Honoring: Camphor Cover, Alieh Atai
- Best Publisher: Qoqnoos Publication

13th For works published in 2015.

- Best Novel: Camera by Ashkan Shariat
- The Novel Worth Honoring (Joint Award): I am not Alice, but it is very strange here, Farid Hosseinian Tehrani and Orion Islands, Roya Dastghib
- Best Publisher: Bootimar Publication

14th For works published in 2016.

- Best Novel: Double, Qasem Shokri
- The Novel Worth Honoring: She is also in Arcadia, Zeinab Zaman
- Best Publisher: Cheshmeh Publication

15th For works published in 2017.

- Best Novel: In the depth of one and half meters, Hanieh Soltanpoor
- The Novel Worth Honoring: The Guide of Dying with Medicinal Herbs, Atiye Attarzadeh
- Best Publisher: Afraz Publication

16th For works published in 2018.

- Best Novel: Teratoma, Roya Dastgheyb
- The Novel Worth Honoring: Blank Status, Amirreza Mafi
- Best Publisher: Ofogh Publication
