= Daoviang Butnakho =

Laotian writer, poet, journalist and musician (1954–2019)

- ດາວວຽງ ບຸດນາໂຄ
- Born: 3 August 1954; Champasak Province, Kingdom of Laos
- Died: 6 March 2019 (aged 64); Champasak Province, Laos
- Occupations: Writer; Poet; Journalist; Musician; Songwriter
- Writing career
- Language: Lao language
- Notable awards: National Artists from Laos
- Musical career
- Genres: Luk thung
- Years active: 1985 –2019

Daoviang Butnakho (Lao: ດາວວຽງ ບຸດນາໂຄ, also spelled Daovieng Boudnakho; 3 August 1954 – 6 March 2019), was a famous Laotian writer, poet, journalist, musician and songwriter in the genres Luk thung and Phleng Phuea Chiwit. He won the National Artist award from Laos in 2011.

== Early life ==
He was born in Khong District, Champasak Province, Laos. He was a son of Ngiem and Khampan Butnakho. He has eleven siblings.

== Career ==
Daoviang Butnakho started work as a journalist in Laotian newspaper Suksa Mai, and wrote many novels, poets and articles.

In 1992, he started working as a musician and songwriter, and was successful. He wrote songs for The Supphies, a Laotian rock music band.

In 1996, Butnakho started to write songs in the genre Luk thung in Laos. He composed for successful Laotian artists including Daeng Douangduean, Bounkerd Niuhuang, Ki Daophet Niuhuang, Kee Morakot, and Xaiyo Kotamee.

In 2002, he wrote the song Kaem Daeng Raeng Jai, which was sung by Tai Orathai.

In 2007, Isan music became very popular in Laos and he stopped songwriting. During his time as a composer, he composed more than 500 songs.

== Death ==
Butnakho died on 6 March 2019 from diabetes in a hospital in Champasak Province, aged 64.

== Discography ==
=== Songwriting ===
Kee Morakot

  - Doi San Sai Tai (ໂດຍສານສາຍໃຕ້)
  - Phoo Ying Klang Kuen (ຜູ້ຍິງກາງຄືນ)

Bounkerd Niuhuang

  - Sao Simueang (ສາວສີເມືອງ)
  - Sao Dong Doak (ສາວດົງໂດກ)
  - Sao Takieng Noi (ສາວຕະກຽງນ້ອຍ)
  - Kam Paeng Hak (ກຳແພງຮັກ)

Noay Maneechothkaewsi

  - Phoo Chay Play Thaew (ຜູ້ຊາຍປາຍແຖວ)

Xaiyo Kotamee

  - Kam Paeng Nguen (ກຳແພງເງິນ)

Ki Daophet Niuhuang

  - Larw Khaw Larw Lao (ເຫຼົ້າຂາວເຫຼົ້າລາວ)
  - Sao Sri Vienetane (ສາວສີວຽງຈັນ)
  - Namta Look Phoo Xay (ນ້ຳຕາລູກຜູ້ຊາຍ)
  - Sao Xe Bangphay (ສາວເຊບັ້ງໄຟ)

Daeng Duangduean

  - Ying Khonnan Maen Phay (ຍິງຄົນນັ້ນແມ່ນໃຜ)
  - Nong Nao (ນ້ອງຫນາວ)

Tai Orathai

  - Kaem Daeng Raeng Jai (แก้มแดงแรงใจ)

== In popular culture ==
In 1999, Komphet Phorncharoen wrote a song titled "Namta Sao Warin" (น้ำตาสาววาริน), which was sung sang by the Isan singer Jintara Poonlarp. The melody came from the pattern of "Sao Simueang", which was written by Butnakho and sang by Bounkerd Niuhuang.

In 2002, Sala Khunnawut covered two songs by Butnakho for the album Phleng Dang Song Fang Khong by Mike Phiromphon.
