= Fredegunde, Neustria kuninganna =

2006 novel by Raivo Sepp

- Author: Raivo Seppo
- Language: Estonian
- Publication date: 2006
- Publication place: Estonia

Fredegunde, Neustria kuninganna is a novel by Estonian author Raivo Seppo. It was first published in 2006.
