= Rosalind Mendis =

Rosalind Mendis (1903–1992) was a Sri Lankan novelist. She is often credited as being the first Sri Lankan woman to publish a novel.

Born Rosalind Jayasinghe in Hedeniya in 1903, her father was Paul Jaysainghe, a businessman and property owner. She married Tennehewa Abrham Albert Mendis when she was eighteen and the couple moved to Colombo.

Her first novel, The Tragedy of a Mystery, was published by Arthur H. Stockwell, Ltd., in London in 1928.

She wrote two more books, Nandhimitra: A Story of Ancient Ceylon (1952), an historical novel; and My Son Lia and Other Short Stories (1975).
