= The Sea Beggars =

Book series by Paul Kearney

The Sea Beggars is an incomplete book series by Paul Kearney. It began with The Mark of Ran (2004) and tells the story of Rol Cortishane. It is based almost entirely around ocean-based adventures. A second volume, This Forsaken Earth (original working title The Stars We Sail By) was published in July 2006. The series was expected to be four books long and the third had nearly been completed when the series was unexpectedly dropped by Bantam in May 2007. After signing a new contract with Solaris, Paul announced this would now be a three book series and that the last book in the series was due to be published as an omnibus in Autumn 2012. However, due to the US publishers never releasing the rights for the final book, this remains unpublished.

== Plot ==
The lead character is Rol Cortishane. His mother was Amelie, supposedly a descendant of the Weren race, a pre-human race with superhuman qualities, often referred to as Angels or Demons. The Weren bred with humans when their numbers diminished thousands of years ago and so many humans thenceforth contained Weren blood, sometimes merely making them beautiful and talented individuals, sometimes warping their bodies into monsters called the Fallen or Half-Trolls.

Amelie's parents, Ardisan and Emilia, were of the former descendants. However it is later revealed that Amelie is actually an ancient, powerful, violent spirit cast into pure Weren form and given a soul.

Rol's father is actually the last of the original Weren, Cambrius Orr, who fled to undiscovered lands because all his half-human children were Fallen and he wished to protect them from being slain to purify the Weren blood. He set himself up as the Mage-King of Kull and has survived for thousands of years in order to sire Rol. How he met Amelie is not yet known. Both his parents, therefore, have pure Weren blood, so Rol is not at all human, but rather an “Angel” of sorts.

Rol was brought up by his grandfather, Ardisan, on the fishing island of Dennifrey, with two “foster parents”, Morin and Ayd. These too are actually Golems created by Ardisan's magic to protect Rol as a child. He was taught nothing of his heritage, believing he was a human, but was socially isolated from other children because of his Weren blood, which usually forms a mental barrier between ordinary people and Rol. In one particularly stormy winter, whilst Rol (now 15) is caring for his family's boat, the Eyrie, he is visited by a strange man, possibly an incarnation of the Secondary god (i.e. a divinity who was not the Supreme God, the Creator) of storms, Ran. This man marks Rol's hand after a confusing conversation. Then he vanishes.

Rol returns to his home to find it threatened by a mob who felt that Ardisan had summoned the appalling weather with his magic. Such a mob had previously killed Rol's grandmother, Emilia. They attack the house, and eventually slay the Golems, but Ardisan and Rol flee, after the former is wounded by a crossbow bolt. He tells Rol to flee to a man called Michael Psellos in the foreign city of Ascari before dying. Rol sails there over several days on the Eyrie.

Rol quickly finds Psellos’ abode in a Tower on the outskirts of the city. However, he is badly wounded by a young woman answering the door, who we later learn to be Rowen. When he recovers, Psellos makes him a low servant in his household. However, one day Rowen, who is Psellos’ assassin and prostitute as well as apprentice, doesn't return from an assignment. Psellos goes to check on her and Rol follows. He ends up rescuing Rowen, killing three criminals in the process. Thence Psellos tells him of his Weren blood and has Rowen train him as a killer, at which he excels.

Rowen falls in love with Rol and, after having sex, they plot together to kill the evil Psellos with some aid. They succeed, but a remnant of Psellos, made by his magic, informs them that they share the same mother, Amelie, hence committing incest. This obviously drives the pair apart, although they still love each other.

Rol then becomes a seaman in despair. After 7 years, he encounters an old friend, Gallico the Half-Troll. They are forced to go to the pirate city of Ganesh Ka, which they come to protect from the Empire of Bionar.

Later another face from the past comes from Bionar to seek Rol's aid. Rowen has become its Queen and needs help to secure her kingdom. He goes to help, but all is not as it seems...
