= Hedeniya =

- Village
- Location within Sri Lanka Location within India
- Coordinates: 7°20′21″N 80°33′53″E
- Country: Sri Lanka
- Province: Central Province
- Time zone: UTC+5:30 (Sri Lanka Standard Time)

Hedeniya is a village in Sri Lanka. It is located within Central Province in Kandy district. Kurunegala Kandy main road is across Hedeniya village. It is situated 13 km (8.1 mi) from Kandy and 29 km (18 mi) from Kurunegala. In middle of the Hedeniya town is faces to the Hedeniya Pujapitiya sub way which linked to Ankumbura, Halgolla, Watagoda, Galhinna, Dolapihilla, Bokkawala, Gallellagama, Doranegama villages and Ranawana to Kandy road. Pallekotuwa road started from Hedeniya town.

Idamegama central college is near to the hedeniya around 2 km far away.

== See also ==
- List of towns in Central Province, Sri Lanka
