= Three on a Honeymoon =

Three on a Honeymoon may refer to:

- Three on a Honeymoon (1932 film), an Austrian comedy film
- Three on a Honeymoon (1934 film), an American Pre-Code comedy film
