= Ki Daophet Nouhouang =

Laotian Luk thung singer (1972–2020)

Ki Daophet Nouhouang ກິດາວເພັດ ໜູຫ່ວງ
- Born: 1 July 1972; Khammouane Province, Kingdom of Laos
- Died: 24 April 2020 (aged 47) Vientiane, Laos
- Genres: Luk thung • Mor lam
- Occupation: Singer • Songwriter • Producer
- Instrument: Vocal
- Years active: 1994–2020
- Labels: Vatasin Studio

Ki Daophet Nouhouang (Lao: ກິດາວເພັດ ໜູຫ່ວງ) (1 July 1972 – 24 April 2020) was a Laotian Luk thung singer.

== Early life and start on stage ==
He was born on 1 July 1972 in Na Wang Village, Nong Bok District, Khammouane Province. He has three siblings. He started performing in 1994 when his siblings founded Luk thung band Num Kosin and became popular in Laos. In 1997, he started as a solo singer.

== Popularity and Jee Hoy (Original name Hoy Jee Kheam Lao ==
He became known in 2001 through his studio album Nam Ta Kway (Lao: ນ້ຳຕາຄວາຍ), that includes a number of popular songs, such as Nam Ta Kway, Muei Tha and Jee Hoy, which was covered by Pee Saderd, Thai Mor lam, Rock singer, and was very popular.

== Death ==
Ki Daophet Nouhouang died on 24 April 2020 due to kidney failure, at age 47.

== Discography ==
=== Studio Album ===
- 1997 - Sao Xe Bangfai
- 2001 - Namta Kawy
- 2002 - Sor See
- 2008 - Mor lam 2008 (with Bounkerd Nouhuang)
- 2014 - Sao Mak Nao Bao Na Wang (with Pink Rassamee)
- 2018 - Loek Ya La Faen

=== Single ===
- 2008 - Miea Mak Phay
- 2014 - Kee Mo (with Pink Rassamee)
- 2018
  - Loek Ya La Faen
  - Fah Oum Fon Kue Khon Oum Nong
  - Koy Nonh Kuen Udomxai
  - Mae Hamg Look Sam
