= Carmen Covito =

Italian writer and translator

Carmen Covito (born 14 November 1948 in Castellammare di Stabia, Province of Naples) is an Italian writer and translator. Her novels include La bruttina stagionata (Bompiani 1992, translated into Spanish, German, French, Dutch, and Greek), Del perché i porcospini attraversano la strada (Bompiani 1995), Benvenuti in questo ambiente (Bompiani 1997) and La rossa e il nero (Mondadori 2002).

== Biography ==
When he was only 15 years old, he sent the story The Circus Boy to the Corriere dei Piccoli, which was published in issue 38 of September 20, 1964.

He majored in philosophy with a thesis on German philosopher Arthur Schopenhauer. She teaches literature in Brescia, is an advertising copywriter, writes comic books, travels to Japan, Spain and finally returns to Italy. For a newspaper she had the opportunity to interview Aldo Busi, who was impressed by her writing and after a few years signed with her translations of works from ancient Italian (Baldassare Castiglione's Il Cortegiano and the Novellino of the thirteenth century) and Nathaniel Hawthorne masterpiece The Scarlet Letter.

In 1992 he published for the publisher Bompiani La bruttina stagionata, a book that won the 1992 Rapallo-Carige “Opera Prima” Prize and the 1993 Premio Bancarella. It is translated into German, Spanish, French, Dutch, Greek, and Romanian. A theatrical monologue (performed by Gabriella Franchini and directed by Franca Valeri, adapted by Ira Rubini) and a film of the same name (starring Carla Signoris, screenplay and directed by Anna Di Francisca) were made from the book.

In 1995, Covito published her second novel, Of Why Porcupines Cross the Road.

The first two novels were followed by a third, a true web immersion: Welcome to this environment. In 1997, Covito translated Claudine at School by Colette for Frassinelli's I classici classics series directed by Aldo Busi. Meanwhile, she published in ebook format a collection of short stories (Skeletons without a Closet and Other Short Stories) and turned to the study of Ancient Near Eastern archaeology to write the novel The Red and the Black, released in 2002. Three years later he published a manual, The Art of Quitting Smoking (unwillingly).

Since 2007, she has been a founding member of the cultural association Shodo.it, which works to spread knowledge of Sino-Japanese calligraphy, of which she remains vice-president until 2020, and since 2011 she has directed the online studies journal AsiaTeatro.

In 2008 he translated Elizabeth Abbott's History of Chastity. In 2012 he returned to fiction with the short novel The Girls of Pompeii, followed in 2013 by the short story The Trial of Justa, set in ancient Herculaneum.

In recent years she has devoted herself mainly to research as an independent scholar, focusing particularly on the history of the reception of Japanese theater in Italy. In 2023 she published her first academic essay, Sadayakko, the Duse of Japan.
