= Louis Émond =

Canadian writer

Louis Émond (born November 9, 1969) is a Quebec writer.

== Biography ==
Émond was born in Lévis, Quebec, Canada, and earned his International Baccalaureate at the Petit Séminaire in Quebec City, where he studied under such teachers as Monique Ségal and Albert Dallard. At this time he discovered Noam Chomsky and wrote a thesis on the social satire in Les demis-civilisés, the Jean-Charles Harvey novel which for a long time was banned. Accepted into the Honours Program in the Department of Physics at McGill University, he soon lost interest in his courses and instead took to spending his time in the library, where he read voraciously the works of Friedrich Nietzsche, Milan Kundera, and Stéphane Mallarmé. After briefly studying political science and art history at Université de Montréal, he entered the literature program at Université Laval.

After a year, he left university life behind, finding it insufficiently challenging, and devoted himself to writing his first novel, Le manuscrit (The Manuscript), at age 20. It was published 12 years later, after the author had worked his way through a string of jobs, was twice involved in legal proceedings, spent a night in jail for public disorder, and was rejected by publishers no fewer than 200 times. Suddenly, after a review by Réginald Martel, the respected critic with La Presse, who wrote: "Our national literature is in need of his immense talent," Émond found himself in the media spotlight amid comparisons with Hubert Aquin and the observation that his libertine tone echoed the spirit of Denis Diderot. Thus it was that Hoc and "my character" became part of literary consciousness. He was soon awarded two Canada Council for the Arts grants. Preferring solitude to the drudgery of media commitments, he left the country when the opportunity arose, and spent two years in Southeast Asia. Upon his return, he submitted his second novel, Le conte (The Tale), to prolific author and publisher Victor-Lévy Beaulieu who, seeing in it shades both of Yves Thériault and Maurice Blanchot, was so taken with it that he purchased the rights to the first novel and published the new one.

Highly critical of the world of publishing, Émond wrote a short story in the form of an anonymous blog that shone a light on some of the practices engaged in by publishers in France and Quebec. In 2009, he published the text, entitled Le sottisier de l'édition (Publishers' Howlers), on MySpace. Then, in early 2010, out of a desire to continue breaking down the boundaries imposed by traditional publishing, he offered a temporary version of his third novel, L'aide-mémoire (The Mnemonic), as a free download.

== Works ==
On the fringes of the literary mainstream, the novels of Louis Émond are linked together by an intimate logic. They are part of a cycle, entitled Le scripte, which is set within an abstract geography peopled by characters who belong more to the realm of fantasy than to that of genetics and who reappear from one work to the next. They are defined primarily in relation to "my character", the narrator's double, including Hoc, who is a distorted reflection, almost a negative, of "my character". Although its manner may seem complex, the writing is precise and carefully rhymed, so that Louis Émond's novels encourage the reader to avoid being duped by the falsities of the narration. Each of his works opens up the references to a variety of other types of texts.

- His first novel, The Manuscript (2002), is the starting point for a meditation on the human condition which begins with the destruction of all ideals: "for a long time I thought I had to start over again, start everything over again," says the narrator. This is the story of a man endeavouring to remain objective as he contemplates the thing that preoccupies him, his own downfall, but gradually he loses the equanimity, the objectivity, the distance he had created.
- His next novel, The Tale (2005), tells the story of an outing in the snow which soon turns into a sort of inward road trip. The act of birth becomes a metaphor for exploring a life change that leads to doubt and a searching of the soul. Here the author examines the idea of a "profane quest for that which may appear sacred".
- His third novel, The Aide-Memoire (forthcoming), is closer in style to The Manuscript than it is to The Tale and brings to a conclusion the triptych formed by these three works. In it the author explores the themes of perception, violence and alienation. The novel tells of the misfortunes of a character who, ultimately, seeks to transform them into life. The Aide-Memoire is written using the new French spelling.
