= Théo Ananissoh =

Togolese writer living in Germany

Theo Ananissoh (born 1962) is a Togolese writer living in Germany. He studied modern literature and comparative literature at the University of Paris III: Sorbonne Nouvelle. He taught in France and Germany, where he moved in 1994. Among his novels are Lisahoé (2005), Un reptile par habitant (2007), Ténèbres à midi (2010), and L'invitation (2013), which was published by Éditions Elyzad while he was in Tunisia.
