= Roxana Pinto =

Costa Rican poet and novelist

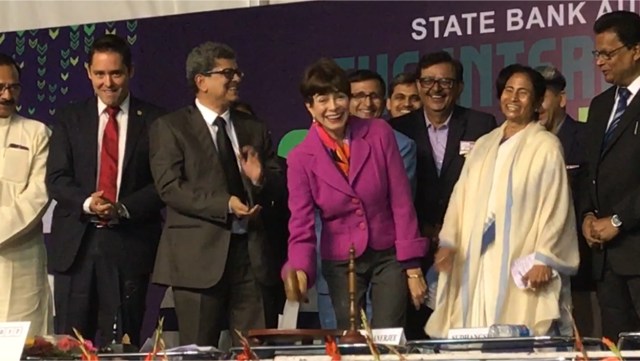
Roxana Pinto (center) in 2017

Roxana Pinto Lopez is a Costa Rican poet, novelist and essayist.

== Biography ==
Roxana was born in San Jose, Costa Rica. Upon her father's death, when she was merely thirteen years old, she moved to Paris to live with her paternal uncle who was the acting Ambassador of Costa Rica in France.
While living there, she discovered several authors like Hugo, Duras, Yourcenar and Proust, which lit her passion for literature.
The Paris of that time was a vibrant one where many movements existed for artistic renovations and social reinventions, such as those led by Simone de Beauvoir or by Michel Foucault. During this era Roxana lived through the sprouting of a new wave of French movie producers like Truffaut, Jean-Luc Godard and the group of Situationists.
The experiences that Roxana Pinto was exposed to during her youth in Paris did not overshadow her work, which maintains its basis in the idiosyncratic, historical, and geographical context from her home country.

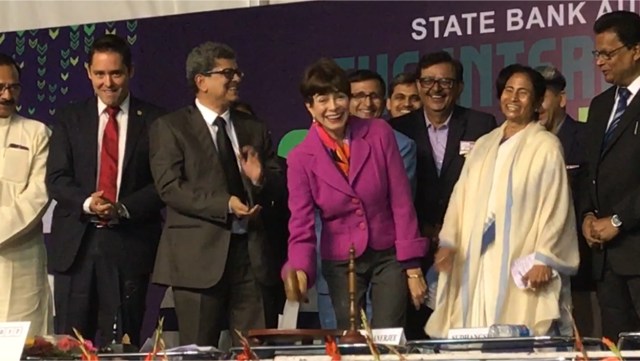
Mamata Banerjee, along with Costa Rican author Roxana Pinto Lopez and poet Nirendranath Chakraborty at the International Kolkata Book Fair, 2017.

As a student at the University of Costa Rica, she studied her undergraduate degree in psychology. Following graduation, she continued her studies to obtain a master's degree in Latin American literature and a master's degree in international relations and diplomacy from the same institution. After successfully achieving this, she was offered a scholarship to ENA (École d´Administration Publique, Paris, France) to complement her studies.
In 2005, Roxana Pinto was named Ambassador of Costa Rica and, in parallel, also named as a delegate at the International Bureau of International Exhibitions. During the same period, she represented Costa Rica at UNESCO. As an Ambassador for five years based in a country with a strong cosmopolitan makeup and with a robust literary tradition such as France, she took the opportunity to build bridges between both countries. This also provided a gateway to spread the Costa Rican culture on an international scale.
Roxana Pinto is married, has four children and currently resides in Costa Rica. She has authored a poetry book which will be published in the near future and is actively working on her next novel.

== List of work ==
- Ida y vuelta. (Novel). Uruk, San Jose, C.R. 2016.
- Donde ellas. (Novel). Perro Azul, San Jose, CR, 2004.
- Frida Kahlo: una experiencia de límites. (Essay) Editorial Plaza y Valdes, Mexico, y Editorial Universidad de Costa Rica, 2001.
- Noticia de silencio. (Poetry). Editorial Universidad Nacional, San José, CR. 1996.

== Awards ==
- Officier at France National Order of the Legion of Honour
- Noticia de silencio received the first prize in poetry from the Costa Rican National University's contest "UNA Palabra"
- The Costa Rican Ministry of Foreign Affairs granted her an honorary recognition in appreciation for the work performed as the Costa Rican Ambassador in France
- Her poem, En Alas de la Paz, received a special prize from the jury of the "IV CERTAMEN INTERNACIONAL NUEVAS VOCES PARA LA PAZ", 2016. Seattle, Washington.
- Roxana Pinto was present, in representation of Costa Rica, during the 41st International Kolkata Book Fair, in January 2017.
