= Paul Kearney =

Northern Irish fantasy author (born 1967)

Paul Kearney (born 1967) is a Northern Irish fantasy author. He is noted for his work in the epic fantasy subgenre and his work has been compared to that of David Gemmell.

== Life ==
Kearney was born in Ballymena, Northern Ireland, in 1967. He studied Anglo-Saxon, Middle English, and Old Norse at Oxford University and then spent several years in both the United States and Denmark before returning to Northern Ireland. He currently lives and writes in County Down.

== Writings ==
Kearney made his name with the stand-alone novels A Different Kingdom (1993), The Way to Babylon (1992) (Note: The Way to Babylon is Kearney's second book, but it was the first published), and Riding the Unicorn (1994). All these novels had some common threads, most notably the use of a hero from our world who journeys into a fantastical one. Despite strong reviews, these books had commercially disappointing sales, and Kearney was asked to consider a more traditional fantasy epic. The outcome was the Monarchies of God, which brought him a measure of success, and ran to five volumes.

After finishing the Monarchies series, Kearney embarked on a new series, The Sea Beggars, which began with The Mark of Ran (2004) and tells the story of Rol Cortishane. It is based almost entirely around ocean-based adventures. A second volume, This Forsaken Earth, was published in July 2006. The series was expected to be four books long and the third had nearly been completed when the series was unexpectedly dropped by Bantam in May 2007. However, Kearney was quickly signed-up by publisher Solaris Books, who contracted him to write a new fantasy epic entitled The Ten Thousand and based loosely on the Anabasis of Xenophon. This book was published in August 2008. Solaris also re-issued the Monarchies of God series as a two-volume omnibus edition and intends to publish the finished Sea Beggars series as soon as Bantam give up the publishing rights. Kearney has also written a tie-in novel based on the Primeval TV series.

In 2009, after a hiatus brought about by Solaris' purchase by Rebellion Books, Kearney was contracted for two additional books set in the world of The Ten Thousand and the Monarchies omnibuses was scheduled for late 2010 publication.

In 2009 Kearney was longlisted for the inaugural David Gemmell Legend Award for Best Fantasy Novel.

=== Bibliography ===
Short Stories

- "South Mountain" (2014, in Dangerous Games)

Novels

- The Way to Babylon (1992)
- A Different Kingdom (1993)
- Riding the Unicorn (1994)
- Primeval: The Lost Island (2008)
- The Wolf in the Attic (2016); a sequel, The Burning Horse (working title: The Other Side of Things) had been schedule for a release in 2019 but apparently has been canceled

The Monarchies of God

1. Hawkwood's Voyage (1995)
2. The Heretic Kings (1996)
3. The Iron Wars (1999)
4. The Second Empire (2000)
5. Ships from the West (2002)
- Hawkwood and the Kings (2010, the first volume of an omnibus edition, collecting Books 1-2)
- Century of the Soldier (2010, the second volume of an omnibus edition, collecting Books 3-5)

The Sea Beggars

1. The Mark of Ran (2004)
2. This Forsaken Earth (2006)
3. Storm of the Dead (unpublished)

The series was dropped by the original publisher Bantam after the second book was published. In 2011 the series was picked up by Solaris, who were due to publish the completed series as an omnibus in 2012 but this was delayed indefinitely due to legal issues: while Bantam UK agreed to release the rights, as of 2016 Bantam Spectra in the US retains the rights, preventing Solaris from publishing any of the books in the series.

The Macht

1. The Ten Thousand (2008)
2. Corvus (2010)
3. Kings of Morning (2012)

Warhammer:

- "Broken Blood", short story in Death & Dishonour (2010)

Warhammer 40.000:

- "The Last Detail", short story in Legends of the Space Marines (2010)
- "The Blind King", short story (2015)
- Umbra Summus, novel, was to be released in May 2015 but currently on hold due to legal issues.
- Calgar's Siege (2017), novel
- Calgar's Fury (2017), novel
- Calgar's Reckoning (2018), novel

Other: The Dumps (2010).
