= Raivo Seppo =

Estonian novelist

- Born: 29 January 1973 (age 52)

Raivo Seppo (born 29 January 1973) is an Estonian novelist. He is a member of the Estonian Genealogical Society (Estonian: Eesti Genealoogia Selts).

His novels Pöörane Villemiine (2003) and Fredegunde, Neustria kuninganna (2006) received considerable acclaim by critics in Estonia.

== Works ==
- Eesti nimeraamat; Olion 1994 Tallinn; ISBN 5-460-00164-1
- Hüatsintsõrmus; Kupar 1995; ISBN 9985-61-045-8
- Ahvatluste oaas; Eesti Raamat 2002; ISBN 978-9985-65-365-4
- Nimed ja nimepäevad; Olion 2002; ISBN 978-9985-66-308-0
- Pöörane Villemiine; Lambri raamat 2003; ISBN 9949-10-210-3
- Fredegunde, Neustria kuninganna; Eesti Raamat 2006; ISBN 9985-65-545-1
- Elavad nimed; Eesti Raamat 2008; ISBN 9985-66-550-3
