= Stephen Maybery =

British writer

- Born: September 1949; Porthcawl, South Wales
- Died: February 2020 (aged 70)
- Occupation: Writer
- Writing career
- Genre: Political satire
- Notable works: My Prime Ministers And I, Gods Knaves And Scoundrels

Stephen Maybery (September 1949 – February 2020) was an author specialising in political satire. For most of his life, he had been a civil engineer and an avid traveller. He grew up and obtained his education in South Wales then had resided in London until his death.

Maybery visited Iran during the Iranian Revolution, and Iraq, where he joined the building of nuclear fallout shelters for Ba'ath Party officials.

His first book, My Prime Ministers And I, came out in May 2004. His second book, Gods Knaves And Scoundrels, was published in December 2009.

== Works ==
Novels:

- My Prime Ministers And I
- Gods Knaves And Scoundrels

Plays:

- Life, Death And The Dear Departed
- Mary, Mary Quite Contrary
