= Óscar Gómez Barbero =

Spanish businessman

Óscar Gómez Barbero (born June 28, 1961 in Bilbao, Spain) is the corporate director of Information Systems at Renfe. He has been charged with the implementation of a €156 million four-year ICT (information and communication technology) modernization process to conclude in 2010.

Previously Gómez Barbero was a partner at PwC-IBM and a general manager of the Basque publicly owned railway corporation Euskotren. He is a graduate of the Jesuit University of Deusto and holds an MBA from the same institution.

He is married and has three children.

In 2025, he was accused of rigging public contracts, to create a public-sector job tailored to a friend of the ministry in 2026, he testified at the trial regarding the mask corruption scandal, during which he was the director of Logirail when the company allegedly gave a job with no actual duties to one of the minister’s friends.
