= Aliyeh Ataei =

Iranian-Afghan novelist and screenplay writer

- عالیه عطایی
- Born: 3 June 1981 (age 45)
- Education: Dramatic Literature MA, Tehran University of Art
- Occupations: screenplay writer, Novelist
- Writing career
- Language: Persian
- Notable works: Koorsorkhi; Eye of the Dog
- Notable awards: Mehregan Adab Literary Awards

Aliyeh Ataei (Dari: عالیه عطایی; born 3 June 1981) is an Iranian-Afghan novelist and screenplay writer who has written several books and short stories for multiple magazines such as Guernica and Michigan Quarterly Review. The main focus of her works is dedicated to the literature of immigration. She has won several literary awards, including Mehregan Adab.

== Biography ==
Aliyeh Ataei was born on 3 June 1981 and grew up in Darmian, a border region between South Khorasan Province of Iran and Farah province of Afghanistan. Growing up in Iran as a female minority, she experienced a lot of discrimination and difficulties that led her to work as a women's rights activist. Her works are deeply influenced by her observations and experiences as a child.

== Career ==
Ataei graduated from high-school in Birjand and went to Tehran to continue her studies at Tehran University of Art, where she received her B.A. and M.A. degrees in screenplay writing. Ataei dedicated most of her focus to writing about immigration. Beside publishing books, she has been working with several magazines such as Hamshahri, Tajrobeh, Saan, and Nadastan. Her short stories have also been translated and published in several English and French magazines, among them Michigan Quarterly Review and Guernica.

== Works ==
=== Bibliography ===
- How could Abel be killed by Cain? (2012)
- Kafourpoosh (2015)
- Eye of the dog (2019)
- Koorsorkhi: a story of soul and war (2021)
- La frontière des oubliés (2023)

=== Short stories ===
- Galileo, Translated by Salar Abdoh, Words Without Borders, (2019)
- The Alcove, Translated by Salar Abdoh, Michigan Quarterly Review (2019)
- The Border Merchant, Translated by Salar Abdoh, Quernica, (2019)
- Parisian Coffee, Translated by Mohammad Sarvi, The Bombay Review (2021)

=== Participations ===
- The story of women of Afghanistan, a collection of short stories by Mohammad Hossein Mohammadi (Kabul, 2017)
- Sous le ciel de Kaboul, a collection of short stories by Khojesta Ebrahimi (Paris, 2018)
- No one's home, a collection of short stories by Elham Fallah (Tehran, 2019)
- Tehran's Valiasr street, a collection of short stories by Kaveh Fooladinasab (Tehran, 2021)

== Awards ==
- Mehregan-e-Adab Literary Award for Kafourpoosh (2014)
- Vav Literary Award for Kafourpoosh (2014)
- Dastan-e-Tehran Award for Thirty Kilometer, from Eye of the dog (2015)
- Dastan-e-Tehran Award for Galileo from Eye of the dog (2018)
- Mashhad Literary Award for Eye of the dog (2021)
- Asghar Abdullahi Literary Award for Koorsorkhi (2021)
- Ma Literary Award for Koorsorkhi (2022)

== Other works ==
- Member of the academy for Hezar-o-Yek-Shab Literary Award (2014)
- Member of the academy for Qand-e-Parsi Literary Award (2017)
- Member of the academy for Ahmad Mahmoud Literary Award (2020)
- Member of the academy for Fereshteh Literary Award (2020)
