= Monarchies of God =

Fantasy series by Paul Kearney

- Hawkwood's Voyage (1995); The Heretic Kings (1996); The Iron Wars (1999); The Second Empire (2000); Ships from the West (2002)
- Author: Paul Kearney
- Language: English
- Genre: Grimdark fantasy
- Publisher: Ace Books; Victor Gollancz Ltd; Solaris Books
- Published: 1995 - 2002
- No. of books: 5

The Monarchies of God is an epic fantasy series written by Irish author Paul Kearney. This series was published between 1995 and 2002 in five volumes. The series is noteworthy for its ruthlessness in dispatching major characters, its large number of epic battles and its use of gunpowder and cannons. Kearney also has an extensive knowledge of sailing and uses this to inform his description of naval travel and combat. The series garnered critical praise and numbers fantasy author Steven Erikson among its fans as he mentions in an interview with Neil Walsh, May 2000. The series has also been criticized for its pessimism, prompting some to label it - and other of Kearney's work - as grimdark fantasy.

One noteworthy feature of the series is its brevity. Each of the five volumes is slim by modern fantasy standards.

== Background ==
The series depicts the continent of Normannia, which is loosely based on Renaissance Europe. The continent is dominated by five powerful kingdoms: Hebrion, Astarac, Perigraine, Almark and Torunna. Other, smaller duchies and principalities exist such as Candelaria, Tulm and Finnmark. The Republic of Fimbria (also known as the Fimbrian Electorates) lies between the five major kingdoms and is clearly modelled after the Roman Empire. Fimbria ruled the entire continent until it lost its empire in a civil war brought on by religious strife some four centuries earlier. Unlike Rome, Fimbria has merely lost its provinces whilst retaining the core kingdoms as an isolationist state. However, despite its loss of empire and isolationist policy Fimbria is still militarily powerful, and its armies are seen as the most powerful on the continent. The five Monarchies of God are united in their worship of God through his messenger, the Blessed Saint Ramusio. Ramusio is not of divine origin (although Ramusian doctrine states that he ascended to Heaven rather than suffering a mortal death) but in most other respects the Ramusian Church resembles Christianity. Like the Christian Church, the Ramusian has both a centre of organisation and power (Charibon, akin to Rome) and a spiritual centre (Aekir, akin to Constantinople and, to a lesser extent, Jerusalem). The Ramusians have an ambivalent relationship with a neighbouring religious and cultural group known as the Merduks, who dwell in the lands to the east of Normannia. Although devastating wars have been fought with the Merduks, many of the western kingdoms have also been enriched on trade with them. The Merduks follow the teachings of the Prophet Ahrimuz and their religion is reminiscent of Islam, although there are fewer direct parallels.

== Detailed synopsis ==
The series opens with the Merduk armies of the Sultanate of Ostrabar capturing the holy city of Aekir after a lengthy siege. The legendary Torunnan commander John Mogen has died whilst defending the city and his army has been decimated. Its remnants are destroyed covering the flight of over 200,000 civilians from the city. The civilians reach the nearby fortress of Ormann Dyke, where Torunnan general Martellus is preparing to make another stand. This part of the storyline follows the fortunes of a young ensign of cavalry, Corfe Cear-Inaf, who escapes the fall of the city and becomes the highest-ranking soldier to reach Ormann Dyke. A blind man Corfe helps on the road turns out to be Macrobius, the High Pontiff of the Ramusian Church who has been blinded by Merduk looters. Corfe becomes a trusted adviser to Martellus and is driven by grief over the death of his wife Heria. However, Heria has survived and becomes the concubine of the Ostraban sultan, Aurungzeb, equally believing that her husband is also dead. Corfe distinguishes himself in the defense of Ormann Dyke, which the Merduks fail to take after a lengthy assault. They retreat into winter camp and Corfe is sent south with reports for King Lofantyr. In the capital Corfe is horrified to find the young king surrounded by sycophants and popinjays who have convinced the king to hold back the main Torunnan strength to defend the capital city of Torunn.

Meanwhile in the kingdom of Hebrion on the far west coast of the continent, King Abeleyn is attempting to halt the purges of the Prelate Himerius, who has issued a pogrom against all users of the Dweomer or magic. Thousands are sent to the pyres in the countryside and in the capital city of Abrusio. In an effort to save some of the Dweomer-folk, Abeleyn and his mage-advisor, Golophin, manage to smuggle some 200 of the magic-users out of the country on board two ships bound across the Western Ocean. Abeleyn's cousin, Murad, has discovered evidence of an unknown continent located across the sea and won the king's approval to set up a colony there. The ship's captain is Richard Hawkwood, a veteran captain battling his own demons. In Hebrion itself Abeleyn and Himerius engage in a battle of wills for control of the kingdom, which Abeleyn seems to gain the upper hand in when Himerius is summoned to Charibon to discuss the success of Macrobius, who is widely held to be dead. Abeleyn himself has to leave shortly after to attend the Conclave of Kings in Vol Ephrir (capital of Perigraine) to discuss the response to the Merduk threat. Both meetings end in unpredicted ways. Himerius is elected High Pontiff just as news of Macrobius' survival is made public in Vol Ephrir. Abeleyn and his allies King Mark of Astarac and Lofantyr of Torunna declare Himerius a usurper, whilst the kings of Perigraine and Almark dismiss the news of Macrobius as a forgery. The Monarchies of God are therefore split down the middle, between the Himerian and Macrobian churches. A surprising development is the promise by Fimbria, which declares itself neutral in the religious conflict, to send an army to the aid of Ormann Dyke.

In Torunna, a group of nobles declare the king a heretic and launch a rebellion. Corfe is given the leavings of slave galleys and prisons to form an army to crush this uprising and surprisingly succeeds, forming an elite cavalry force known as the Cathedrallars in the process. Corfe finds himself sponsored by Lofantyr's mother, the Queen Dowager Odelia, and they become lovers, to Lofantyr's displeasure. Odelia manages to have Corfe assigned to command a march northwards to reinforce Ormann Dyke. Unbeknown to the Torunnans, however, the Ostrabarans have secured an alliance with the supreme Merduk sea power of Nalbeni and landed a huge army south of the dike.

In Charibon two monks, Alberec and Avila, discover evidence in the records of the library that Ahrimuz and Ramusio are one and the same. However, they are attacked by a fellow churchman who is revealed to be a werewolf and flee into the snow. They are found by the Fimbrian army marching to Ormann Dyke and are carried along with them.

The Torunnans abandon Ormann Dyke and flee south to the capital, but are cornered by two Merduk armies. The Fimbrians arrive first and help repel the enemy, but only Corfe's heavy cavalry wins the day, defeating the Merduks at the Battle of the North More. After the Fimbrians sacrifice half their army in a delaying action, the Torunnans reach the capital. Macrobius recognises Alberec's findings and makes him a bishop in the new church. Alberec goes among the Merduks to preach the new doctrine and is taken before the sultan, who is amused by his story. However, several Merduk mullahs are revealed to be already troubled by discovers in captured Aekir and are soon convinced by Alberec's findings.

Meanwhile, Abeleyn and Mark are both forced to attack their own capitals, which have been occupied by the Knights Militant of the Church in their absence. Mark wins his victory relatively easily, but Abeleyn is nearly killed and Abrusio is half-destroyed in a massive combined-arms assault from both land and sea. Abeleyn's former lover, Jemilla, tries to establish a regency based on her unborn child (who, she claims falsely is Abeleyn's son), but Golophin pre-empts her by using powerful magic to restore Abeleyn to full health.

In the far west, Hawkwood and Murad's expedition is successful, despite the presence of a werewolf on board, apparently an agent of some power on the western continent. The mage who killed the werewolf Bardolin, a pupil of Golophin, has premonitions of a powerful force awaiting them in the west. On the continent they learn that a powerful mage named Aruan has established a mageocracy thanks to the incredibly powerful aura of magic which exists in this new land. Aruan bases his power on lycanthrophy: he and all his followers are werewolves, wereapes, and similar creatures. The expedition is virtually wiped out, with only seventeen survivors returning to Abrusio and Bardolin transformed into a werewolf.

The war in the east comes to a final end. Lofantyr is killed in the King's Battle, when the Torunnans mount a massive assault on the Merduk army in camp. Although victorious, the Torunnan army suffers catastrophic losses and the only person who stands between the Merduks and the capital is Corfe, promoted to general of the armies at Queen Odelia's command. An attempted coup by Torunnan nobles fails and Corfe plans a final attack on the Merduks at Armagedir. The Torunnans are again victorious, but only after the Cathedrallars sacrifice themselves to stop the army being outflanked. With this final defeat the sultan bows into the pressure of his mullahs and agrees to a peace treaty based on mutual recognition of a common religious heritage between Ramusian and Merduk. Corfe marries Odelia and becomes King.

Meanwhile, the Himerian Church establishes itself as a new empire, securing direct control of Almark after the king bequeaths the realm to the church on his death. Perigraine and the smaller principalities later all swear fealty to Himerius as well. However, Himerius is in the thrall of Aruan, who converts him into another werewolf. The Vicar-General of the Knights Militant realizes that the church has become the Second Empire, which in prophecy will bring about the Age of the Wolf and the fall of humanity, but is killed by Aruan before he can alert the rest of the church.

Ships from the West takes place seventeen years after the preceding volumes in the series. In this time the Grand Alliance has been forged between Astarac, Hebrion, Torunna and the Merduks, whilst the Second Empire has grown in power as well. Aruan is now openly the leader of the church, although Himerius remains a figurehead. Aruan has corrupted Bardolin and most of the Dweomer-folk of the continent to his service. The Alliance has built a massive fleet to meet the expected invasion of Aruan's armies from the western continent, but this fleet is decimated in a single battle by magical forces, including flying creatures which attack out of a supernatural fog. Abeleyn and Mark are both killed. Hebrion surrenders to the invaders. Meanwhile, Astarac is invaded and destroyed by the Himerian armies. Torunna is left standing alone. King Corfe has erected massive defences across a mountain pass lying along the border with Almark, but again the Himerians deploy magical forces (including large armies of werewolves) to shatter this line. Torunna is invaded from north and south and the enemy are only held at bay by the arrival of Merduk armies to reinforce the capital. Corfe, meanwhile, has crossed the mountains by a little-known pass and attacks Charibon, stealing a march on the Second Empire and killing Aruan and Bardolin. Corfe is badly wounded in the battle. The Torunnan army is virtually destroyed, but a Fimbrian army arrives to save the remnants. The book ends with an epilogue in which Corfe crosses the eastern mountains with two figures who turn out to be Ramusio himself and Shahr Baraz, the Merduk general who captured Aekir.

== Notable features of the series ==
The Monarchies of God is notable for covering a large number of events (as the above detailed synopsis reveals) in a short space of time. The page-counts for the five volumes in mass-market paperbacks are 382, 320, 255, 294 and 296 pages respectively. The brevity of the series has been both applauded and criticised: there is a particular concern that characterisation is rather broader than it should be for such conflicted and troubled individuals.

The series is notable making most of its characters extremely troubled and conflicted and killing off most of the characters. Unusually, with the exception of Corfe, most of the major characters die in rather off-hand and unheroic ways (Mark is randomly sprayed with fire from a broken lantern and pulled down with a sinking ship, for example). Minor and secondary characters are usually given much more heroic ends. The series is also deeply concerned about depicting realism in warfare: in The Second Empire Corfe reluctantly decides not to attack a Merduk host rampaging through a town as he lacks the numbers to guarantee success. During the night he waits for reinforcements, the sack of the town is shown in extreme detail, including a graphic rape scene. The intention behind this scene is to show the unavoidable consequences of such military decisions.

The book takes an unusual approach to religion. Oddly, the least devout characters in the books seem to be among members of the Ramusian Church itself. In a schism of it in a reformed "Macrobian" and a more and more secular "Himerian" branch, simple, common or disowned clerics tend to be the most devout characters; in Ramusian church as well as Ahrimuz ummah, secular seduction brings the protagonists from the "right path", while the true faith often is more dangerous and less rewarding. As always, characters from the Himerian branch also are depicted as devout, but mislead by the religious zeal of Himerius; characters from the Macrobian branch can be contemptuous and arrogant. Even patriarch Macrobius states he began to "see" only as his court and pomp were taken from him and he was tortured and almost killed by Marduk. Corfe and Macrobius meet first when Macrobius' golden symbol of his pontificate is stolen, a parable of him being disowned in the sack of Aekir (IRL Constantinople).

On multiple occasions, common paupers are depicted as standing beyond the politics of nobility or Aruan's new "Dweomer" state. Commoners and peasants live the same, be their masters Ramusians, Merducs or the utopia of Aruan. Science is more than once described as only a way to improve warfare and "methods of killing".

The intolerance of the (Himerian) church. ironically caused by Aruan himself to split the common, open society of Dweomer- as well as "mundane" folk, brings the Dweomer folk almost to the brink of extinction and makes them - another ironical fact - join the Himerian states after Aruan converts Himerius into a werewolf, thus opening them to the retribution king Corfe planned and probably had executed had he survived. In the dream-like end scene, when his soul joins Ramusius/Ahrimuz and Shar Baraz, he confesses he had "almost taken the wrong path".

The final volume in the sequence has received a great deal of criticism, unusually a lot of it from the author himself. The final battle for Charibon is actually the final chapter of the book: we learn nothing about the aftermath of the war. In an interview on the Malazanempire forum in the summer of 2005, Paul Kearney admitted that he rushed the end of the book and hopes to one day produce a second edition that would be roughly 100 pages longer and resolve more of the loose threads. According to Kearney, the Fimbrians reemerge as the dominant force on the continent after the Second Empire's fall but Torunna retains its independence and Hebrion eventually becomes its own master again.

At the end, all the high nobility whose fates the series followed are extinct: King Mark's family was obliterated by the "Flyers", a race of Chimeras that Aruan created; the "illegitimate son" of Abeleyn and Jemilla in reality Hawkwood's son; Isolla, Marks sister and Abeleyns wife, killed childless; Aurungzeb at last killed by Heria, his son heavily influenced by her; and it being more than doubtful that Corfe "produced" an heir with Heeria and Aufungzeb's daughter, "laying together" only in their rushed wedding night. The last male heir to Shar Baraz was killed along with Aruan, Bardolin and Corfe. The whole elder generation died, the Fimbrian electorates "having no interest in horses, probably that's why they never bred a nobility" or a younger generation influenced by egalitarian and meritocratic thinking superseding the feudal state. Many protagonists see its end, and even the "Second Empire" is a fulfilment of the mendicant church elder Honorius' prediction (a book from him - the "Saint"/"Prophet" was active a mere 500 years before the series - gave the "Macrobians" their faith and led to peace between Ramusians and Ahrimuzians).

The series was originally supposed to be more of a series of standalone novels about Hawkwood's voyages but was altered after Kearney's publishers suggested trying something more akin to 'standard' epic fantasy. After the series' success, Kearney was able to return to his original plan in his current series, The Sea-Beggars, which starts with The Mark of Ran (2005) and continues with The Stars We Sail By (2006). The Monarchies series is published by Ace Books in the US and by Victor Gollancz Ltd in the UK, although some of the volumes are now out of print.

In fall 2010, Solaris Books has reissued the series in two volumes, Hawkwood and the Kings and Century of Soldier.
