= Datta Raghunath Kavthekar =

Indian writer

Dattatreya Raghunath Kavthekar (1901 – 1979) was a Marathi novelist from Maharashtra, India.

== Biography ==
He was born in 1901 in Wai, Bombay Presidency. He lost both of his parents at an early age. After his high school education, he joined the Indian Army then under the British Raj. He was a World War I veteran.

For some time, Nagpur University had included study of Kavthekar's fictions in its Master of Arts curriculum.

He became closely associated with the Marathi film industry.

== Works ==
- Ūmaḍalelyā Bhāvanā (1937)
- Ujeḍāntīla Andhār (1937)
- Nādanīnāda (1939)
- Gulābācyā Pākaḷayā (1940)
- Cāndaṇyāntīla Sāvalyā (1940)
- Apurā Ḍāva (1941)
- Reśamācyā Gāṭhī (1942)
- Śālan (1943)
- Mandā (1943)
- Āpulakīcī Jhaḷ (1962)
- Vāṭa Pāhatã Locana (1965)
- Ābhāḷācī Sā̃valī (1967)
- Ruperī Kaḍā (1968)
- Malā Sobat Havīya -Phakta Sobat! (1973)
- Svapna Vegī Sare (1974)
- Mandā Mhaṇajeca Andha Andhārī Baisale (1978)
- Vikhuralele Prem

=== Movies based on Kavthekar's novels ===
- Shubhamangal (1954)
- Kunkwacha Karanda (1971)
- Apura Dav
- Reshmachya Gathi
