= Phyllis Joyce McClean Punnett =

Writer of the national anthem of Saint Vincent and the Grenadines (1917–2004)

Phyllis Joyce McClean Punnett (March 17, 1917 – October 12, 2004) was a musician and writer known for writing the lyrics of "Saint Vincent, Land so beautiful", the national anthem of Saint Vincent and the Grenadines, in 1967.
