= Oscar R. Gómez =

Argentine writer, psychoanalyst and researcher

Oscar R. Gómez (Osy)
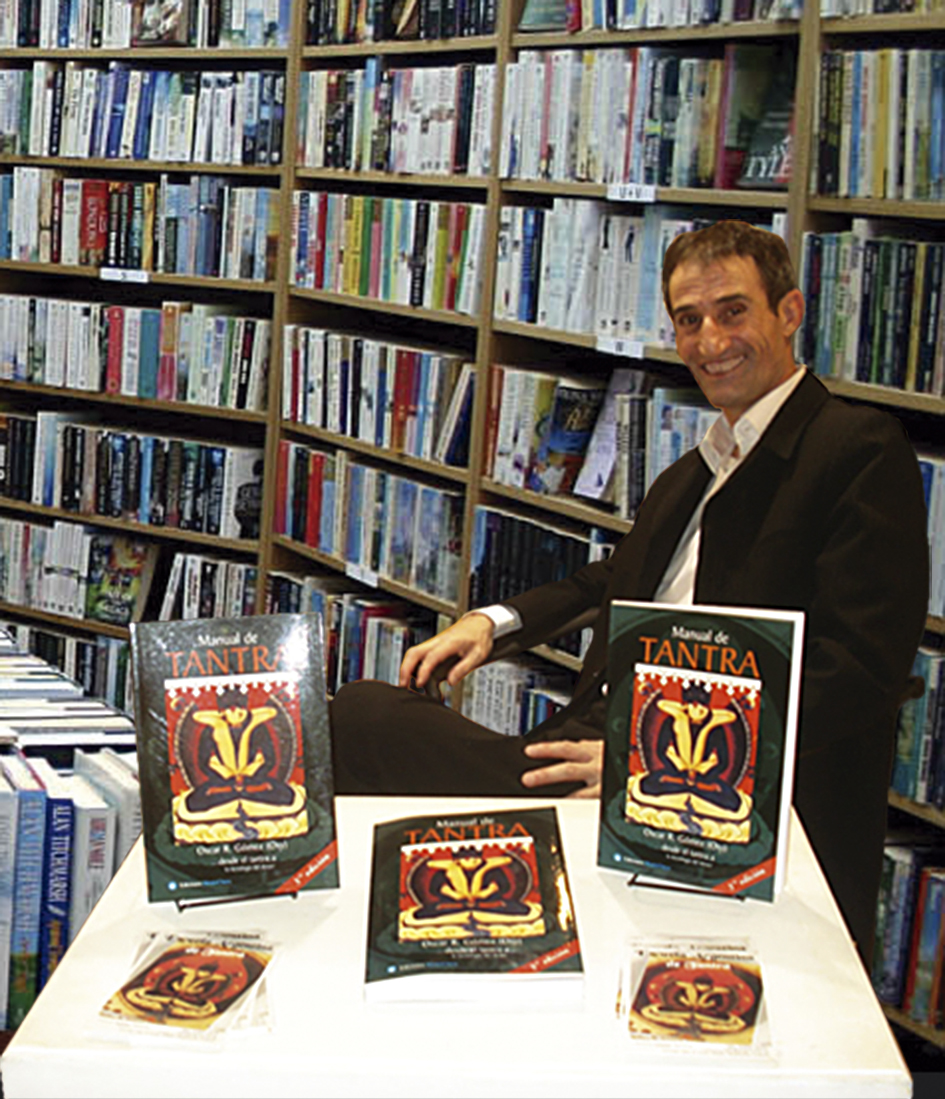
- Osy presenting one of his most important works at the Book Fair of Buenos Aires.
- Born: Oscar Rodolfo Gómez Martínez; March 9, 1956 (age 70); Buenos Aires Province, Argentine
- Education: National University of La Plata
- Occupations: Writer, Psychoanalyst, Researcher
- Children: Oscar David Gómez February 9, 1980 (age 46) y Noah Gómez Silveira de Andrade September 16, 2014 (age 11)
- Awards: Doctor Honoris Causa in 2008

Signature
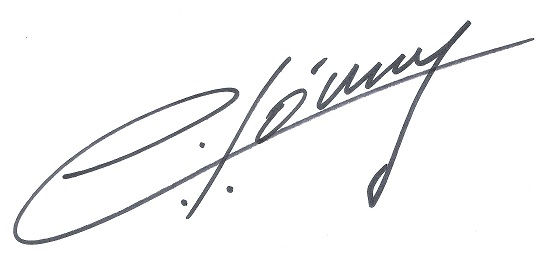

Oscar R. Gómez (Osy) (born March 9, 1956, in Puerto Belgrano, province of Buenos Aires) is an Argentine writer, psychoanalyst and academic researcher who became renown as an integrator of Tibetan Tantric Buddhism with Western formal sciences and who constituted the first religious organization in Argentina engaged in the Tantric Worship practice in children and adults.

== Biography ==
At 12 he began to study and experiment in Eastern philosophies. He was first initiated in the Rosicrucian Order, then walked through the traditional paths of bhakti yoga and Jnana yoga, and in 1972, he received his initiation into the practice of tantra that lies within tantric buddhism

Along with his training in Eurasian philosophies and religions, he was being trained in Western biology, philosophy, psychology, psychoanalysis, sociology, and psychobiology.

With this double training, he developed a method of transmission of the Tantric philosophy that adapts to Western life, free from oriental cultural forms and the superstitions of the people who practiced tantra centuries ago and yet retains its tradition and paradigmatic essence.

"This philosophy can be transferred faster because there are not many differences with the Western philosophy, which takes the vision of tantra based on the notion of subject developed by the 3rd Dalai Lama, Sonam Gyatso and Grand Kahn Jalaluddin Muhammad Akbar and introduced in Europe by the Jesuit Antonio de Montserrat". Osy (February, 1995).

Out of this paradigmatic look and (Tantric) source, Osy developed a psychotherapeutic technique of self-knowledge and self-improvement that he called Tecnología del deseo® —such as others that were developed within the Eranos Circle— and suits the modern life needs: it does not involve mysticism, magic or superstitions, it is based on western and formal knowledge, and it is approachable for all ages and genres, including children and the elder.

In 1992, after an interview with the fourteenth 14th Dalai Lama in Buenos Aires and together with other students and a coordinator appointed by him, he opened at his home in Berazategui (Buenos Aires) a space called La Casa del Tantra to foster integration in the western academic arena what he considers to be the source of existential phenomenology.

In 1995, within the Argentine Association for Psychobiological Research, he created the Argentine School of Tantra (Escuela Argentina de Tantra), which is the first and only institution devoted to spread the Tantric philosophy in Argentina. In 2000, driven by a group of Spanish students, he created the School of Tantra in Spain (Escuela de Tantra en España).

Strong advocate of clarity in the transmission of ideas, in his classes, lectures and writings, he does not use terms in languages unknown to the receiver (Sanskrit and Tibetan, for example), which makes his message easily understood and concepts are clearly explained. That is called Enlightenment. To see reality as it is and to call things by their name.

It is precisely because of this point that he is not willing to give up the name tantra as the source of his knowledge as others have done so and who first called it Age of Enlightenment, existentialism, Gestalt, psychodrama or emotional thought.

“To hold on to the origin of an idea and link it to the subsequent ideas generated out of it allows for an ongoing development of academic knowledge. There is no excuse to rename and self-assign foundational rights on an existing concept by giving it a new name only to collect royalties or to avoid being excluded from a peer group, as it happened to the first Jesuits initiated in Tibetan Tantric Buddhism, who were forced to call themselves alumbrados or Illuminated of Spain rather than tantric”. Oscar R. Gómez (February, 1995).

Due to Oscar R. Gómez's input, in July 2005, some initiated in tantric philosophy by him decided to gather to spread his thought and thus created a non-profit foundation called Fundación MenteClara. The official presentation of the foundation took place at a dinner party where the Argentine School of Tantra was celebrating its 10th anniversary.

On December 18, 2006, members of Fundación MenteClara —based on Oscar R. Gómez teachings and character— met in a special session to constitute a religious organization called “Culto Tantra”, which is officially registered in Argentina to be practiced publicly and to spread the tantric cult, which was banned in 1959 with the invasion of Tibet by China. As from that date, a large number of followers of different ages, including children and elders, have been initiated in this cult and still practicing.

== Social work within the academic arena ==
From 1982 to 2001, within the Argentine Association for Psychobiological Research (AAIP for its acronym in Spanish), he devoted to research, teaching and social assistance in the field of mental health. In 1995 he developed the first digital polygraph in Argentina to provide biofeedback therapy for patients with repetitive strain injury (RSI) and neuromuscular disorders.

He created both a school of Social Psychology —which had two sites: one in the Province of Buenos Aires and another in the city of Buenos Aires— and a school of Therapeutic Accompanying Professionals. Training at both schools was free for students (travel and study material expenses were also aid-funded) in exchange for community aid service in their respective places of residence.

As director of the AAIP's research and assistance department, he created a daycare center for patients with mild psychotic disorder in Berazategui, province of Buenos Aires. Patients were treated by professionals from different disciplines who worked pro bono. Monies received from health insurance plans and NGO's aid programs were allocated in full to cover building expenses, improvements in the quality of patients’ environment and non-medical staff.

At that time period, he fostered putting into practice HIV assistance and prevention programs in partnership with the International Federation of Red Cross and Red Crescent Societies, the Ministry of Education from the Republic of Paraguay and the Ministry of Health from the Democratic Republic of Congo. All these social interventions were carried out with the support of the Municipality of Berazategui and the Ministry of Health of the province of Buenos Aires, led by Dr. Juan José Mussi.

As a result of this track record a variety of mass media accounted for, in 1997 he was appointed by Argentine president, Dr. Carlos Saúl Menem, Director of the Federal Program for People at Social Risk from the Ministry of Social Development. At such capacity, he furthered the Residential Caregiver training program

In June 2000, all the before mentioned association's activities came to an end due to a financial crisis, the same economic reasons that would take René Favaloro to end his own life.

== Peace efforts ==
September 20, 2007: He was invited to lecture at the 2nd Argentine Symposium against all forms of violence and discrimination carried out at the Universidad Tecnológica Argentina – UTN. Such event was:

- Declared of Educational Interest by the Argentine Ministry of Education, Science and Technology

- Declared of Interest by the School of Medicine of the University of Buenos Aires

- Declared of Social Interest Declared by the Buenos Aires City Legislature

== Present time ==
In March 2010, he created the School of Body Psychotherapy as a department within Fundación MenteClara.

At present, he is a consultant for researchers in the field of theology, sociology, anthropology and philosophy looking to trace and link characters and events in Asia and Europe.

== Publications ==
- "Manual of Tantra Vol I - Personal Upgrade Software", Oscar R. Gómez (Osy), Editorial Menteclara, 07/2008, ISBN 978-987-24510-0-4
- "Manual of Tantra Vol II - Emotional reprogramming", Oscar R. Gómez (Osy), Editorial Menteclara, 11/2008, ISBN 978-987-24510-1-1
- "Manual of Tantra Vol III ...from tantra to the technology of desire", Oscar R. Gómez (Osy), Editorial Menteclara, 11/2009, ISBN 978-987-24510-2-8

Read at: Academia.edu

- "Manual of Tantra Vol IV - Certified Course of Tantra", Oscar R. Gómez (Osy), Editorial Menteclara, 12/2009, ISBN 978-987-05-7510-8
- "Tantrism in the Society of Jesus - from Tibet to the Vaticcan today", Oscar R. Gómez (Osy), Editorial Menteclara, 05/2013, ISBN 978-987-24510-3-5

Read at: Academia.edu

- "Antonio de Montserrat - Biography of the first Jesuit initiated in Tibetan Tantric Buddhism", Oscar R. Gómez (Osy), Editorial Menteclara, 12/2015, ISBN 978-987-24510-4-2

Read at: Academia.edu

- "ANTONIO DE MONTSERRAT - THE SILK ROAD AND THE SECRET PATHS OF TANTRA" Gómez, O. (2016). «Antonio de Montserrat - The Silk Road and the secret pahs of tantra». Revista Científica Arbitrada de la Fundación MenteClara, 1(2), 5-20

== Awards ==
As a result of over 33 years of spreading the knowledge of tantra from an academic perspective, on June 13, 2008, the Organization of the Americas for Educational Excellence (ODAEE) awarded him with the title of Doctor Honoris Causa in recognition of his contribution to the development of science and arts
