= Jane Bakaluba =

Ugandan writer

- Born: Jane Bakaluba (also known as Jane Jägers or Jane Kironde Bakaluba); 1939 (age 86–87); Kampala, Uganda
- Occupations: Novelist, publisher
- Writing career
- Years active: 1970s–present
- Genre: African literature
- Subjects: Gender, cultural identity, modernity
- Notable work: Honeymoon for Three (1975)

Jane Bakaluba (born 1939 in Kampala, also known as Jane Jägers or Jaggers Bakaluba and Jane Kironde Bakaluba) is a Ugandan-Canadian novelist and publisher now living in Canada. She is known for her novel the Honeymoon for Three published in 1975 by the East African Publishing House in their series African Secondary Readers, in which she contrasts traditional and westernised women. She is a member of the Baganda people, and speaks Luganda and English. She worked in publishing in Kampala, and later emigrated to Canada.

In Women's Literature in Kenya and Uganda: The Trouble with Modernity in 2011, Kruger wrote that: "By the early 1990s only four Ugandan women writers (Rose Mboya [perhaps a misspelling of Rose Mbowa], Elvania Zirimu, Jane Bakaluba and Barbara Kimenye) had gained national prominence ...". She was one of fourteen women included in Oladele Taiwo's 1985 Female Novelists of Modern Africa, in a group of six who were "known mainly for a single novel each".

== Contribution ==
She published novels in Luganda language such as Nampewo agenda mu somero in 2013. She addresses cross-cultural conflicts and some challenges faced by women in the society with conservative views on women roles through her writing. This contributed to female identity and space in broader discussions.

Her book Honeymoon for Three (1975) is often used for academic studies of African Women's literature to analyze themes of gender, modernity, cultural identity and the value placed on aspects like virginity in traditional marriage.

== Selected publications ==
- Honeymoon for Three (1975, East African Publishing House)
- Nampewo agenda mu ssomero (2013, Kampala: Fountain Publishers, ISBN 9789970252350, in Luganda)
