= List of Tunisian women writers =

This is a list of women writers who were born in Tunisia or whose writings are closely associated with that country.

== A ==
- Ines Abassi (born 1982), poet, journalist
- Faouzia Aloui (born 1958), poet, novelist
- Hind Azouz (1926–2015), short story writer, essayist

== B ==
- Hélé Béji (born 1948), novelist, essayist
- Souhayr Belhassen (born 1943), journalist, women's rights activist
- Essma Ben Hamida (born 1951), journalist, entrepreneur
- Néjia Ben Mabrouk (born 1949), screenwriter
- Lina Ben Mhenni (1983–2020), linguist, activist, writer and blogger
- Sihem Bensedrine (born 1950), journalist, human rights activist
- Sophie Bessis (born 1947), Tunisian-born French historian and feminist
- Noura Borsali (1953–2017), journalist, writer and feminist
- Messaouda Boubaker (born 1954), novelist, short story writer
- Dorra Bouzid (1933–2023), journalist, art critic and feminist

== C ==
- Aïcha Chaibi, novelist
- Amira Charfeddine (fl. 2019), novelist
- Djemâa Chraïti (born 1960), writer
- Rachida el-Charni (born 1967), short story writer and novelist
- Mounira M. Charrad (born 1942), Franco-Tunisian sociologist active in the United States

== E ==
- Fadela Echebbi (born 1946), poet
- Sophie el Goulli (1931–2015), poet, novelist, historian

== F ==
- Faten Fazaâ, novelist

== G ==
- Wafa Ghorbel (1975- ), novelist, academic and singer.
- Sophie el Goulli (1932–2015), writer and art historian
- Amel Grami, academic, writer, and women's rights activist
- Nidhal Guiga (born 1975), actress, playwright, screen writer and film director

== H ==
- Jalila Hafsia (1927-2023), novelist, journalist
- Gisèle Halimi (1927–2020), feminist writer, lawyer
- Fethia Hechmi (born 1955), poet and novelist

== K ==
- Sabiha Khemir (born 1959), novelist, non-fiction writer, illustrator, artist

== L ==
- Meherzia Labidi Maïza (1963–2021), politician, translator and writer
- Latifa Lakhdar (born 1956), historian and politician
- Dalenda Larguèche (born 1953), historian and women's rights activist

== M ==
- Sonia Mabrouk (born 1977), Tunisian-born French journalist and author
- Lamia Makaddam (born 1971), poet, journalist and translator
- Boutheina Jabnoun Marai, contemporary journalist, magazine publisher
- Samar Samir Mezghanni (born 1988), Arabic-language children's writer
- Nabiha Ben Miled (1919–2009), feminist and social justice advocate
- Emna Mizouni (fl. since 2013), communications expert, business executive, Wikimedian of the Year 2019
- Amel Mokhtar (born 1964), journalist and novelist
- Amel Moussa (fl. 1990s), poet

== P ==
- Perpetua (died 203), writer of a prison diary from Carthage, The Passion of Perpetua and Felicity

== R ==
- Naziha Réjiba, journalist, founded the online journal Kalima in 2000

== S ==
- Amina Said (born 1953), French-language poet, short story writer, essayist

== T ==
- Alia Tabaï (born 1961), novelist
- Najiya Thamir (1926–1988), essayist, short story writer, playwright, novelist, women's rights activist

== Z ==
- Fawzia Zouari (born 1955), writer and journalist

== See also ==
- List of women writers
- List of Tunisian writers
