= List of Tunisian writers =

This is a list of Tunisian writers

- Ines Abassi (1982– ), poet^{[Banipal]}
- Mohamed Bacha (1968– ) linguist. specialist in Tunisian Arabic. translator. short story writer
- Faouzia Aloui (1958– ), poet and short story writer^{[Banipal]}
- Mahmoud Aslan (1902–after 1971)^{[Gikandi]}
- Hachemi Baccouche (1916–2008), novelist and essayist^{[Gikandi]}
- Hélé Béji (1948– ), novelist and essayist in French^{[Gikandi]}
- Tahar Bekri (1951– ), poet in French and Arabic^{[Gikandi]}
- Noura Bensaad, novelist and short story writer^{[Banipal]}
- Messaouda Boubaker (1954– ), novelist and short story writer^{[Oxford]}
- Hédi Bouraoui (1932– ), poet, novelist and academic
- Aïcha Chaibi, novelist
- Rachida el-Charni (1967– ), novelist and short story writer^{[Banipal]}
- Brahim Dargouthi (1955– ), novelist and member of steering committee of Union of Tunisian Writers
- 'Ali al-Du'aji (1909–1949), novelist^{[Gikandi]}
- Aboul-Qacem Echebbi (1909–1934), poet
- Miled Faiza (1974– ), poet and translator^{[Banipal]}
- Wafa Ghorbel (1975- ), novelist, translatir, singer and academic
- Mohamed Ghozzi (1949–2024), poet and critic^{[Banipal]}
- Sophie el Goulli (1932–2015), novelist and art historian^{[Gikandi]}
- Gisèle Halimi (1927–2020), lawyer, feminist activist and essayist
- Faraj Hawwar (1954– ), writer, novelist, and researcher
- Fethia Hechmi (1955– ), novelist, short story writer and poet^{[Oxford]}
- Ibn Khaldoun (1332–1406), polymath
- Bashir Khrayyef (1917–1983), writer and teacher^{[Gikandi]}
- Shukri Mabkhout (1962– ), novelist and academic^{[Oxford]}
- Lamia Makaddam (1971– ), poet
- Abdelwahab Meddeb (1946–2014), novelist and poet^{[Gikandi]}
- Jamila Mejri (1951– ), poet
- Albert Memmi (1920–2020), sociologist, novelist and essayist^{[Gikandi]} ^{[Killam & Rowe]}
- Mahmoud Messadi (1911–2004), novelist and playwright^{[Gikandi]}
- Amel Mokhtar (1964– ), novelist and journalist^{[Oxford]}
- Hassouna Mosbahi (1950–2025), novelist and short story writer^{[Banipal]}
- Amel Moussa, poet and journalist^{[Banipal]}
- Moncef Ouahibi (1949– ), poet^{[Banipal]}
- Perpetua (died 203), writer of a prison diary from Carthage, The Passion of Perpetua and Felicity
- Najwa Al-Rayyahi (1962– ), writer and academic
- Kamel Riahi (1974– ), novelist and short story writer^{[Banipal]}
- Youssef Rzouga (1957– ), poet
- Amina Saïd (1953– ), poet
- Habib Selmi (1951– ), novelist and short story writer^{[Banipal]}
- Walid Soliman (1975– ), writer, essayist and translator
- Salih al-Souissi al-Qayrawani (1871–1941), writer, and social reformer
- Alia Tabaï, novelist^{[Allen]}
- Ahmad al-Tifashi (–1253), poet, writer and anthologist
- Mustapha Tlili (1937–2017), novelist and academic^{[Gikandi]}
- Mohamed Ali Yousfi, writer and translator^{[Banipal]}
- Z (active as of 2007), anonymous political cartoonist and writer
- Fawzia Zouari, writer and journalist^{[Banipal]}
- Mohamed El Aziz Ben Achour (1951– ), writer, historian, and politician
- Anis Chouchène, (1982– ), poet and activist
- Nejiba Hamrouni (1967–2016), journalist
- Wassim Ben Salah (1974- ), poet and writer.
- Zakia Ben Salah (1948- ) poet.
- Amira Ghenim (1978- ) novelist and writer.
- Alaa Talbi (1978- ) activist and poet.
- Sami Mokaddem (1982 - ) novelist, writer, and publisher.
- Sonya Ben Behi translator and publisher.
- Khaoula Hosni translator and writer.
- Atef Attia publisher and thriller writer.
- Azza Filali (1952- ) novelist and writer.
- Gilbert Naccache (1939 - 2020) leftist activist and writer.
- Hassanine Ben Amou (1948 - ) writer and novelist.
- Abderrazek Karabaka (1901 - 1945) poet, writer, and theater performer.
- Tahar Haddad (1899 - 1935) author, reformer, socialist, unionist, and scholar.

== See also ==
- List of African writers by country
