= Nabiha Ben Miled =

- نبيـهة بـن ميلا
- Born: Nabiha Ben Abdallah; 4 March 1919; Tunis, Tunisia
- Died: 6 May 2009 (aged 90); Tunis, Tunisia
- Other names: Nabihah Bin Milad
- Occupations: Independentist, women's rights activist
- Years active: 1936–2009

Nabiha Ben Miled (Arabic: نبيـهة بـن ميلاد, 4 March 1919 – 6 May 2009) was a pioneering Tunisian women's rights activist and nationalist. She was a leading voice in the press speaking for women's rights and Tunisian independence from French colonialism. She served as president of the Union of Tunisian Women from 1952 to 1963 and wrote articles in favor of Tunisia's independence.

== Early life ==
Nabiha Ben Abdallah was born on 4 March 1919 in Tunis to Baya Bint Mahjoub and Othman Bin Abdallah. Her parents were part of the Tunisian bourgeoisie, and their ancestors had settled in Tunis in the nineteenth century. She attended Sidi Saber Primary School and had aspirations to become a teacher or a lawyer, but her father discouraged her from further studies after she graduated from primary school. At the age of fifteen, she married the doctor Ahmed Ben Miled, who had been educated in France and was a leader in the Tunisian Communist Movement. Though her mother had insisted that she wear her hijab as a child, her husband encouraged Miled to live without being veiled.

== Activism ==
With the encouragement of her husband, in 1936, Miled joined the Tunisian Union of Muslim Women (MWUT) led by Bchira Ben Mrad. Initially formed to support the education of girls, by 1938, they had extended their aims to providing assistance to political prisoners and those involved in the independence movement seeking an end to the French colonial administration. When demonstrators were injured during a protest on 9 April 1938, Dr. Miled turned their home into a hospital, and Nabiha assisted him, providing nursing services for those injured by colonizer forces. During World War II, she gave birth to the couple's only daughter, Khadija, during a severe famine. She and her husband provided boxed milk to neighbors in their Halfaouine neighborhood, and she organized a soup kitchen. Using contacts with local merchants, Miled led the women of her neighborhood to make two hundred meals each day from products donated by local merchants.

In 1944, Miled left the MWUT, disillusioned by the lack of action of the group and its reliance on the political party Destour. She joined the Tunisian Women's Union (TWU) (Arabic: الاتحـاد النسـائـي التونسـي), which was affiliated with the Tunisian Communist Party. Her shift in ideology and allegiance came about because the leadership of the Destour party, rather than demanding Tunisian autonomy outright, was in favor of liberalization through modification of the existing constitution. Miled was in favor of the more radical approach, which combined nationalist goals with social improvement programs, especially those aimed at providing for women's rights and schooling opportunities for disadvantaged children.

In 1951, Miled was appointed to serve on the board of the TWU, and the following year, she became president of the organization, serving in that capacity until it was dissolved in 1963 for its close ties to the communist party. From 1952, she also helped her husband, Mohamed El Salami, and Mohamed Saleh Ka'far write and clandestinely deliver the newspaper Commandos, which urged Tunisians to become involved in liberating themselves and fight for their right to nationhood.

Rather than join the National Union of Tunisian Women, which Miled saw as too closely allied with the one-party state, she left the formal women's movements. However, she continued to publish articles in a French magazine, The Proletarian Revolution, until her death. With her children grown, she began working as a social worker at the Charles Nicolle Hospital in Tunis but resigned when the staff began to pressure her to inform on colleagues and adhere to particular religious practices.

In 1993, a history of the women involved in the nationalist movement in Tunisia, Mémoire de femmes: Tunisiennes dans la vie publique, 1920–1960 (Memoirs of women: Tunisians in public life, 1920–1960) was published; it contained a biographical sketch of Miled.

== Death and legacy ==
Miled died in Tunis on 6 May 2009. In 2013, the Ilhem Marzouki Feminist University (French: Université Féministe Ilhem Marzouki) held a tribute in her memory and to honor the contributions of historic women to feminism in Tunisia.

== See also ==
- List of Tunisian women writers
- National Union of Tunisian Women
- Tunisian Association of Democratic Women
