= Jean-Claude Perrot =

French historian (1928–2021)

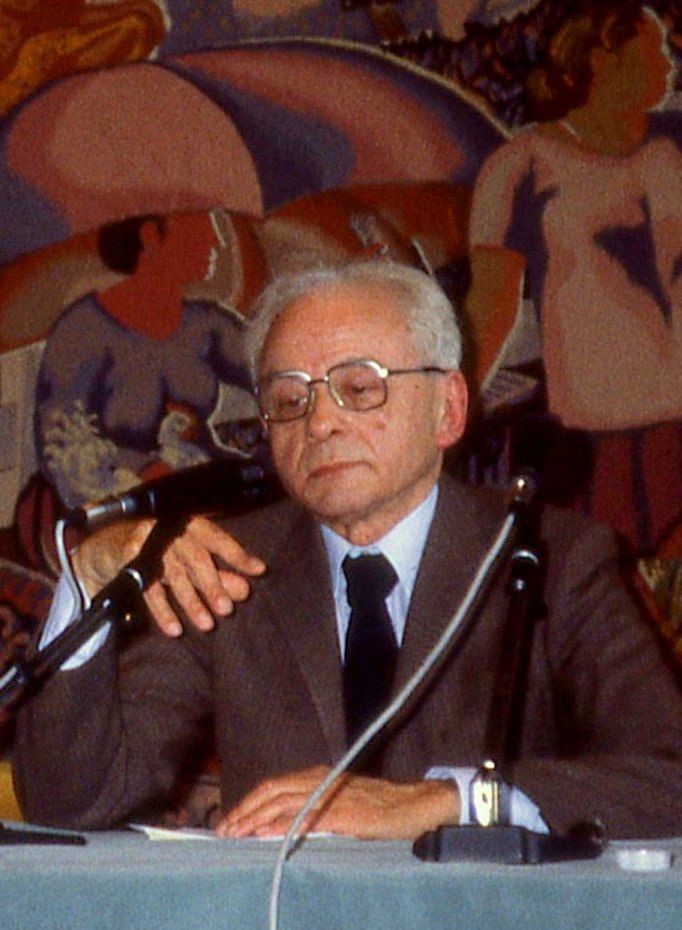
- Perrot in 1994
- Born: 8 March 1928; Antony, France
- Died: 10 December 2021 (aged 93); 6th arrondissement of Paris, France
- Education: University of Poitiers; University of Paris 1 Panthéon-Sorbonne
- Occupation: Historian
- Spouse: Michelle Perrot

Jean-Claude Perrot (8 March 1928 – 10 December 2021) was a French historian. He specialized in urban history, economic politics, demography, and statistics. His studies focused around 18th-century France and he was a professor at the Sorbonne University Association and the School for Advanced Studies in the Social Sciences. He was also President of the French Institute for Demographic Studies.

== Personal life and death ==
Born in Antony on 8 March 1928, Perrot studied at the Lycée Jean-Giraudoux in Châteauroux. He earned a degree in history from the University of Poitiers and finished his studies at the Sorbonne. Prior to his military service, he taught at the Lycée de Saint-Brieuc. On 17 October 1953, he married fellow historian Michelle Perrot, with whom he had one daughter, Anne.

Perrot died in Paris on 10 December 2021, at the age of 93.

== Notable publications ==
- "Rapports sociaux et villes au xviiie siècle" (1973)
- "Genèse d’une ville moderne, Caen au XVIIIe siècle" (1973)
- L’Âge d’or de la statistique régionale française : an IV-1804 (1977)
- "La comptabilité des entreprises agricoles dans l’économie physiocratique" (1978)
- "Les dictionnaires de commerce au xviiie siècle" (1981)
- "Le présent et la durée dans l’œuvre de Fernand Braudel" (1981)
- State and statistics in France, 1789–1815 (1984)
- "Nouveautés : l’économie politique et ses livres" (1984)
- "Les économistes, les philosophes et la population" (1988)
- De la richesse territoriale du royaume de France (1988)
- Une histoire intellectuelle de l’économie politique, xviie – xviiie siècles (1992)
