= Belhadj =

Belhadj or Belhaj may refer to:

- Abdelhakim Belhadj (born 1966), the emir of the Libyan Islamic Fighting Group
- Ahlem Belhadj (1964–2023), Tunisian psychiatrist and activist
- Ali Belhadj (born 1956), Vice-President of the Islamic Salvation Front in Algeria
- Ali Belhaj (born 1960), Moroccan politician
- Nadir Belhadj (born 1982), footballer
