= Vitalis Danon =

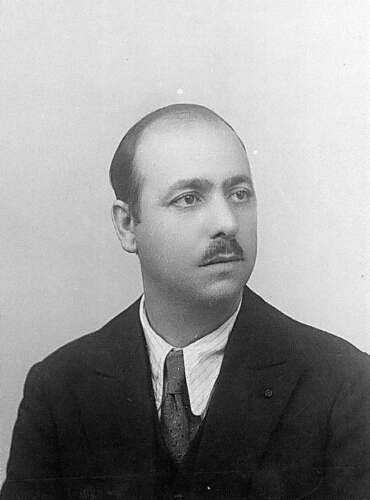
- Vitalis Danon
- Born: December 10, 1897; Edirne, Turkey
- Died: June 1, 1969 (aged 71); Cannes, France
- Occupations: Writer, educator
- Years active: 1917–1969

Vitalis Haim Danon (Hebrew: ויטליס דאנון; December 10, 1897 – June 1, 1969) was a Jewish-Tunisian writer and professor. Danon is notable for his groundbreaking portrayal of day-to-day Jewish Tunisian life in his book, Ninette de la Rue du Péché (Ninette of Sin Street).

== Early life and education ==
Danon was born in Edirne, Turkey, which at the time was part of the Ottoman Empire. His family was Sephardi Jews.

Danon graduated from the Alliance Israélite Universelle (AIU) in Paris. In 1917, he earned a degree from the teachers' college, École Normale Israélite Orientale (ENIO) in Paris.

== Career ==
In 1919, Danon became the director of the AIU school that was located in Sfax, Tunisia.

From 1921 to 1926, Danon was the director of Tunisia's largest AIU school, Tunis Ecole de la Hafsia.

In 1929, he co-authored the book La Hara conte...Folklore Judéo-Tunisien with Raphael Lévy (Ryvel) and Jacques Véhel. Danon then published Aron le colporteur (Aaron the peddler) in 1933 and in 1934, he published Dieu a pardonné (God forgive).

In 1938, Danon published his most successful book, Ninette de la Rue du Péché (Ninette of Sin Street). From 1954 to 1955, Danon published two volumes of Petite histoire des Juifs.

In 1955, Danon published "Etude sociale sur cent familles juives de la Hara." Danon was the director of all AIU schools from 1954 to 1960.

Danon retired to Cannes in 1960 and died in 1969.

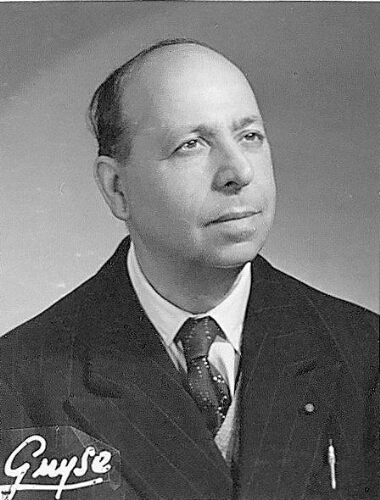
Vitalis Danon in 1958

== Selected works and publications ==
=== Works ===
- Véhel, Jacques; Danon, Vitalis; Lévy, Raphael (1929). La Hara conte...Folklore Judéo-Tunisien (in French). Paris: Les Éditions Ivrit.
- Danon, Vitalis (1933). Aron, le colporteur: Nouvelle juive nord-africaine (in French). Tunis: Éditions de La Kahena, Société des écrivains de l'Afrique du Nord. OCLC 44075468.
- Danon, Vitalis (1934). Dieu a pardonné: Nouvelle juive nord-africaine (in French). Tunis-Paris: Editions de la Kahena – Librairie Lipschutz. OCLC 473823432.
- Danon, Vitalis; Hubac, Ginevra Pierre (préf. de) (1938). Ninette de la Rue du Péché (in French). Tunis: Éd. de la Kahéna. OCLC 463881172.
- Danon, Vitalis (1954–1955). Petite histoire des Juifs (in French). Tunis: La Caravelle. OCLC 646516085. – 2 volumes: 1. De la Création à la captivité de Babylone. 1954. 2. Du retour de la captivité à la mort de Saadia. 1955

==== English translations ====
- Danon, Vitalis (2017). Stein, Sarah Abrevaya; Brozgal, Lia (eds.). Ninette of Sin Street. Translated by Kuntz, Jane. Stanford, CA: Stanford University Press. ISBN 9781503602298.

=== Selected publications ===
- Danon, Vitalis (1955). "Etude sociale sur cent familles juives de la Hara: monographie primée par l'Alliance israélite universelle et l'American joint distribution committee (mai 1954)". Cahiers De Tunisie (in French). 10 (3e année). Tunis: Impr. SAPI: 180–210. OCLC 491943108.
- Danon, Vitalis (2008). "Images de la Hara en 1949". Cahier D'études Maghrébines (in French). 2: 243–247. OCLC 949167343.
