= Marie-Paule Djegue Okri =

Ivorian agriculturist and activist (born 1993)

Personal details
- Born: 1993 (age 32–33)
- Citizenship: Ivory Coast
- Occupation: agriculturist, human rights activist
- Awards: 2024 Simone de Beauvoir Prize

Marie-Paule Djegue Okri (born 1993) is an agriculturist and human rights activist from Ivory Coast. She is the winner of the 2024 Simone de Beauvoir Prize.

== Early life and education ==
Okri was born in 1993 in Issia, Ivory Coast, to a father who had 14 children. Her mother was uneducated, but her father pushed her and her other siblings to study. When she was a teenager, her father died, but her uncles continued to help her complete her higher education.

Okri is an agriculturist and an agroecology consultant. She studied tropical agriculture with a specialization in plant breeding at the International Academy of Sciences and Technology in Abidjan and trained as an agricultural engineer at the Institute of Tropical Agriculture between 2022 and 2024.

== Activity ==
In 2020, she founded the Ivorian Women's Rights League, which began its activity as a facebook page in social media. There, she fights for the economic and financial independence of women in rural areas in Ivory Coast. The league encourages women to leave the informal sector and engage in income-generating activities, mainly in the agricultural sector. Economic independence is seen as a way to combat domestic violence by providing women with the means to escape violent homes. She also promotes education for girls and young women across Ivory Coast, especially in rural areas.

Her feminist commitment is part of an Afro-feminist perspective that recognizes the specific struggles of African women. Marie-Paule Okri does not consider feminism as a universal struggle but as a struggle in context, taking into account local realities and traditions.

== Prizes ==
January 2024, she won Simone de Beauvoir Prize for her work for gender equality in Africa.
