= Bchira Ben Mrad =

Tunisian women's rights activist

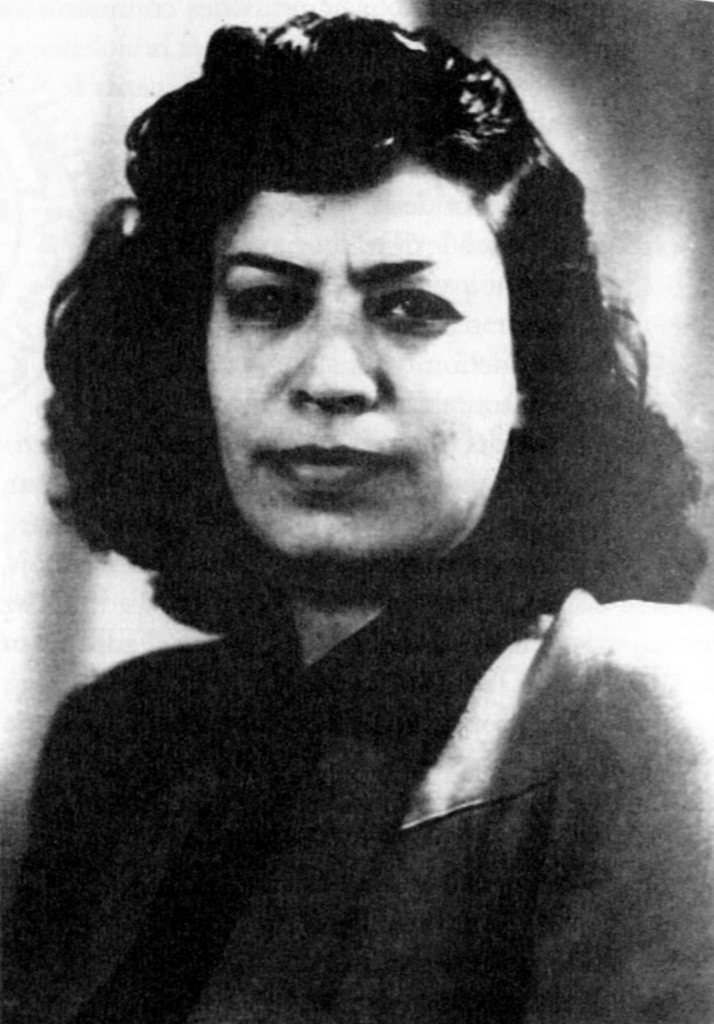
Bchira Ben Mrad

Bchira Ben Mrad (بشيرة بن مراد ;1993–1913) was a Tunisian women's rights activist. She founded and chaired the Muslim Union of Tunisian Women (UMFT) from 1936 to 1956.

== Biography ==
She was born into an old Tunisian family of religious scholars (ulama), originally Ottoman, which dates back to Khodja Ali Al Hanafi, and Ottoman military imam of the army who came to Tunis for the battle conducted in 1574 at La Goulette against the army of Charles V.

Bchira Ben Mrad was the daughter of Sheikh El Islam, Mohamed Salah Ben Mrad, and the granddaughter of a mufti of Tunis, Hmida Ben Mrad. Sallouha, her mother, is the daughter of another Sheikh El Islam, Mahmoud Belkhodja.

Her father gave her and her sisters a traditional education and home tutoring provided by a family friend, the Sheikh Manachou. She married Ahmed Zahar.

== Activism ==
After hearing a discussion between nationalist leaders on the dire situation of the country, attended notably by Mahmoud El Materi, Bchira Ben Mrad had the idea of creating a framework for women to be active in the national movement.

In 1936, Ali Belhouane and other activists unsuccessfully organized a fair to raise money for North African students settled in France. Ben Mrad then decided to organize with women. She obtained the agreement of nationalist leaders Belhouane and Mongi Slim, initially skeptical, and created an organizing committee of Naima Ben Salah, Tewhida Ben Sheikh (the first woman physician in Tunisia), the Hajjaji girls (whose father is a minister), Hassiba Ghileb (granddaughter of Cheikh El Medina Sadok Ghileb) and Nabiha Ben Miled (wife of Ahmed Ben Miled): they managed to gather 9000 people in Dar El Fourati, remained a bourgeois family traders, and collected a significant amount of money given to nationalist leaders. A week later, in May 1936, she founded the UMFT, constituting the first Tunisian women's organization. With the support of her father and sisters, she published numerous articles in her father's journal, Shams al-Islam (The Sun of Islam).

The UMFT worked with the Neo Destour. The association, which did not get its visa until 1951, established its statutes which aim to build knowledge among women, to direct them to education within the limits of morality and religion, and to promote institutions for young people and children. The permanent members of the office are Hamida Zahar (Secretary General and sister of Bchira), Tewhida Ben Sheikh, Nebiha Ben Miled, and Essia Ben Miled (sister of Bchira), Hassiba Ghileb, Souad Ben Mahmoud, Naima Ben Salah, Jalila Mzali, and Mongiya Ben Ezzeddine. Other women joined the UMFT as activists like Moufida Bourguiba, Wassila Ben Ammar, Radhia Haddad, and Fethia Mzali.

Ben Mrad remained the president of the UMFT until its dissolution in 1956.

== Tribute ==
Several streets are named after her to honor her memory.
