= Monia Ben Jemia =

Tunisian feminist and academic

- Born: October 12, 1958 (age 68)
- Occupation: Professor of law

Academic background
- Education: University of Carthage
- Thesis: Le jeu de l'ordre public dans les relations internationales privées de la famille (1997)
- Doctoral advisor: Ali Mezghani

Academic work
- Institutions: University of Carthage

Monia Ben Jemia (born 1958) is a Tunisian law professor, academic, feminist and president of the Tunisian Association of Democratic Women (ATFD). Jemia is a professor of law at the University of Carthage.

== Biography ==
Jemia reports that because she was born into a conservative family, she was immensely inspired by the feminist works of Simone Du Beauvoir as a teenager. Jemia's mother was illiterate and her family stuck to strict gender roles. She was one of the first in her family to complete advanced studies. As soon as the ATFD was created, she joined, and she eventually became president of the organization. ATFD focuses on trying to curb issues of violence against women (such as making incest easier to prosecute and adopting more humane interview tactics when interviewing children). Their secondary, though also important focus is to increase the codified rights of women who are married (increase property rights, let women also be the legal guardian of their children, etc.). One of Jemia's central beliefs is that the democracy in Tunisia will not move forward unless women receive more fundamental rights.

She published a novel, Grandfather’s Naps: A Tale of Incest, in January 2021.
