= Sara García Gross =

- Born: 1986 (age 39–40); Chalchuapa, El Salvador
- Education: Central American University; National Autonomous University of Mexico
- Occupation: Activist
- Awards: Simone de Beauvoir Prize (2019)

Sara García Gross (born 1986) is a Salvadoran activist, psychologist, feminist, and human rights defender. She is the coordinator of political advocacy for the Citizen Group for the Decriminalization of Therapeutic, Ethical, and Eugenic Abortion, founded in 2009. She is also a member of the Salvadoran Network of Women Human Rights Defenders. In 2019, she was presented with France's Simone de Beauvoir Prize for her work promoting abortion rights.

== Personal life ==
Sara García Gross was born in Chalchuapa in 1986, living through the 1979–1992 Salvadoran Civil War as a child. She earned a degree from the Central American University in psychology. She specialized in gender studies at the National Autonomous University of Mexico. As of June 2019, she resides in Buenos Aires, where she is pursuing a master's degree in Human Rights and Democratization for Latin America and the Caribbean at the National University of General San Martín.

== Career ==
In 2014, she presented the audio report Del Hospital a la Cárcel, which deals with issues related to women's sexual and reproductive rights.

The Citizen Group for the Decriminalization of Therapeutic, Ethical, and Eugénic Abortion, for which Gross works, is a multidisciplinary social organization that advocates for changing Salvadoran legislation on abortion, created in 2009. In addition, they promote sex education and defend women who have been charged or convicted of abortion or related matters. The organization has brought 11 cases before the IACHR in its efforts to free women convicted of abortion. Abortion in El Salvador is illegal and has been since changes to the law in 1998 removed exceptions present in the Penal Code of 1973. El Salvador is one of 6 Latin American countries that ban abortion. Abortion is tied to socioeconomic factors, as most prosecutions under the law were brought against young impoverished women with little education.

Garcia has also spoken out against the high rate of femicides and sexual violence in El Salvador, stating "Se ejerce una violencia de estado contra las mujeres" – "There is state violence against women."

García is also a member of the Salvadoran Network of Women Human Rights Defenders.

In January 2019, Paris Diderot University awarded her the Simone de Beauvoir Prize for her efforts to decriminalize abortion in cases of rape, human trafficking, when the mother's life is in danger, or when the mother is a minor.
