= Noura Borsali =

Tunisian academic and activist

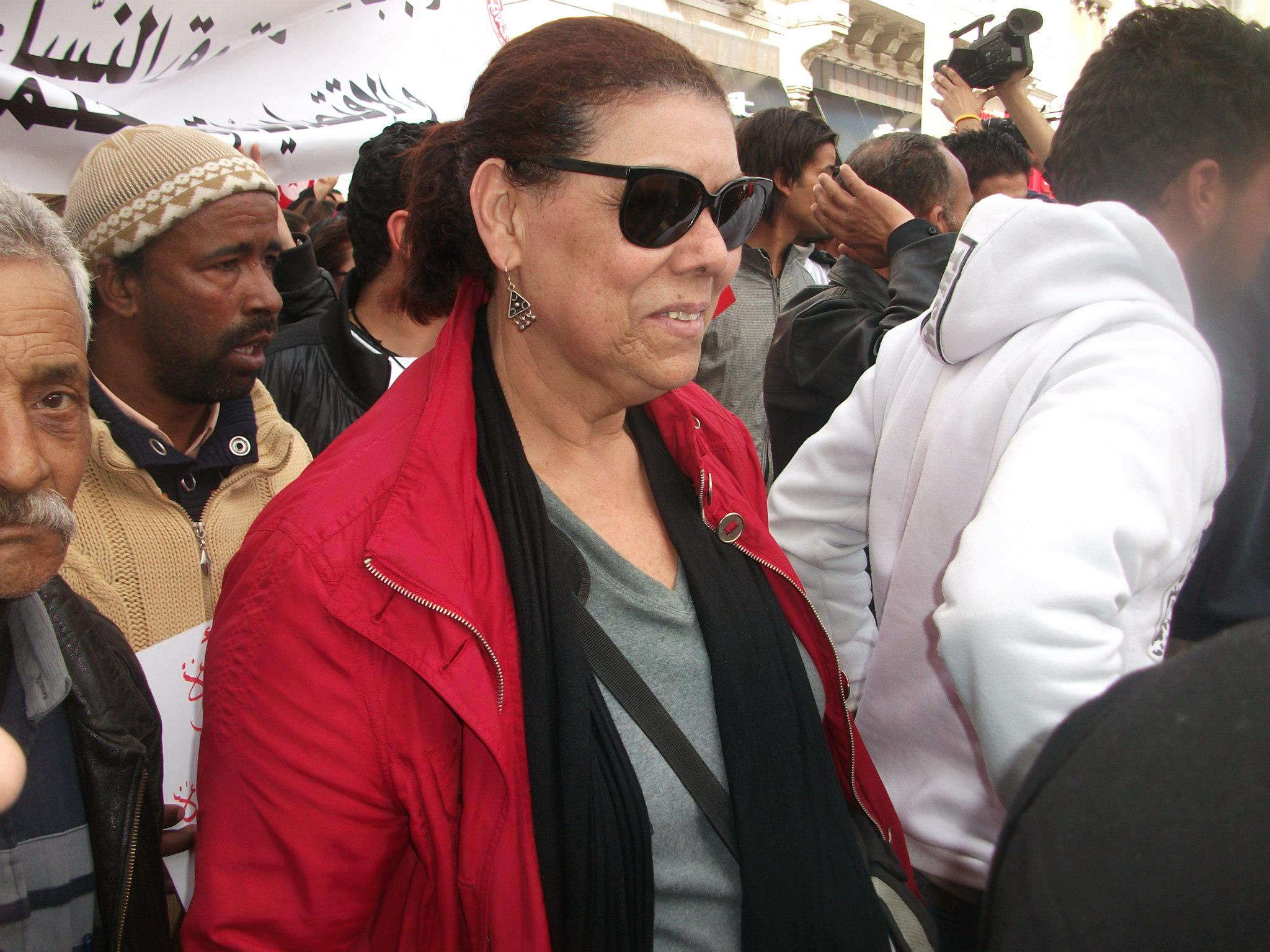
- Noura Borsali in a demonstration against political violence in Tunisia, on 9 March 2013

Personal details
- Born: 19 August 1953
- Died: 14 November 2017 (aged 64)
- Occupation: Journalist, writer
- Profession: Human right activist

Noura Borsali (Arabic: نورة البورصالي) (19 August 1953 – 14 November 2017) was a Tunisian academic, journalist, writer, literary critic and film critic, as well as a trade unionist, a human rights activist and a figure of Tunisian feminism.

== Early life ==
Noura Borsali was born into a family of trade unionists. Her father Tahar Borsali was one of the founders of the Tunisian General Labour Union (UGTT). Her mother, Sida Ben Hafidh Borsali, was a trade unionist. and an activist in the same organization.

== Career ==
=== Journalism ===
Borsali was also a journalist known for her researches and for her critical forums in politics and culture. From 1980 she worked with various independent Tunisian newspapers and magazines such as Le Phare, Réalités and Le Maghreb. 4. she was a columnist and reporter in Algeria, Morocco and Egypt. Although her requests, from the Tunisian authorities, for authorization of publication did not get any answer, neither acceptance nor refusal. In March 1991, she created La Maghrébine, an independent women's magazine.

From 2011, she published chronicles and interviews in Tunisian sites and newspapers such as La Presse of Tunisia, Kapitalis, Jomhouria and Nawaat.

=== Human rights activities ===
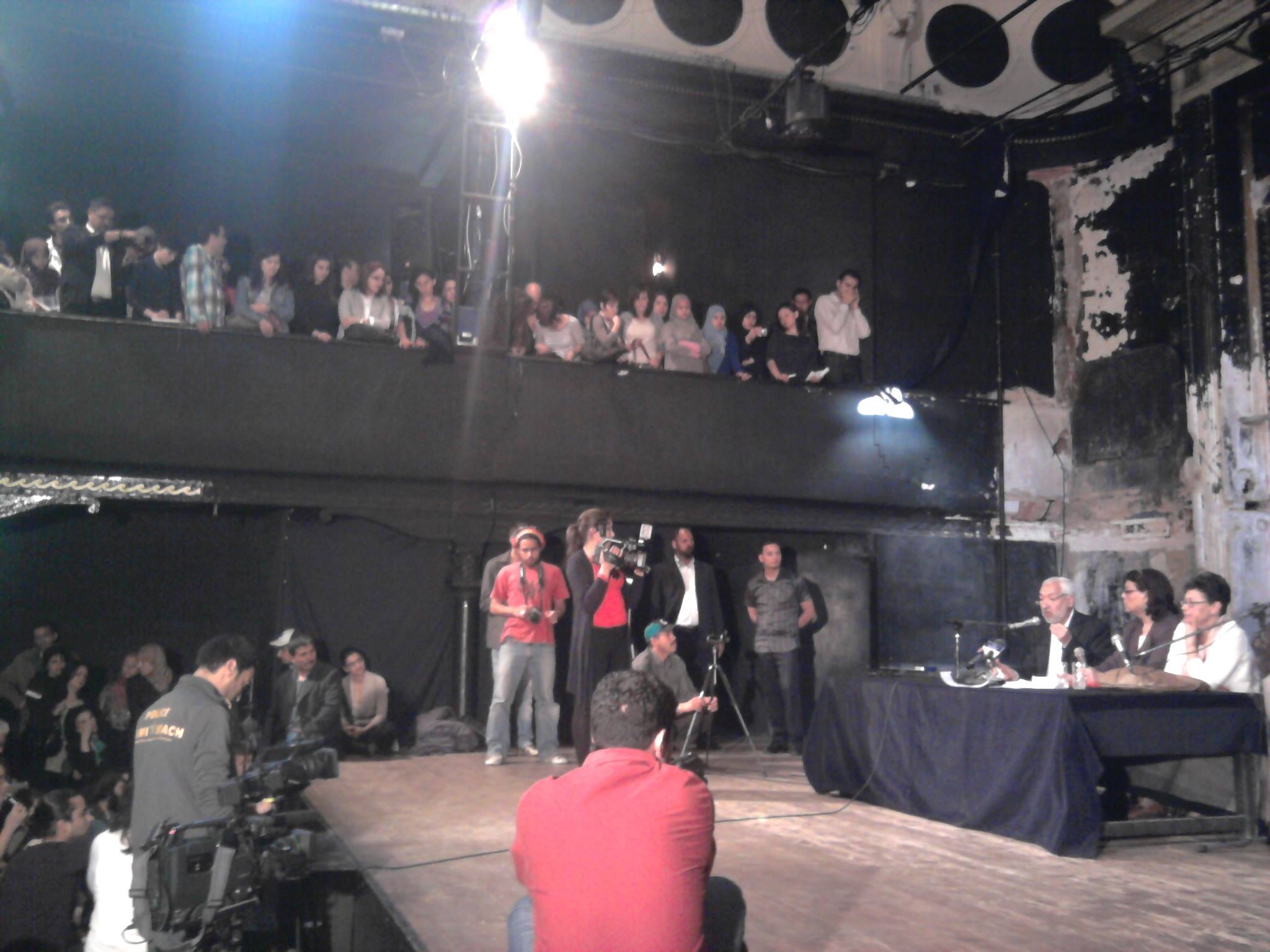
Noura Borsali leading a debate between Rached Ghannouchi and Neila Sellini organized by the Tunisian Independent Citizens Forum in Tunis, 14 April 2011

Borsali was a member of the union of secondary education within the Tunisian General Labor Union. She was a human rights defender who was also active for Amnesty International. She was also a feminist activist, a founding member of the Tunisian Association of Democratic Women and the Tunisian Women's Association for Development Research.

After the 2011 revolution, Borsali founded the Tunisian Independent Citizens Forum at Espace El Hamra and a women's workshop on democratic transition at the Tahar Haddad Cultural Club whose conferences and debates she ran from January to June 2011. She became an independent member of the Higher Authority for Realisation of the Objectives of the Revolution, Political Reform and Democratic Transition from 17 March to 13 October 2011 and joined the Higher Committee on Human Rights. She was also elected a member of the Truth and Dignity Body by the Constituent Assembly, a position she held from May to November 2014.

=== Cultural activities ===
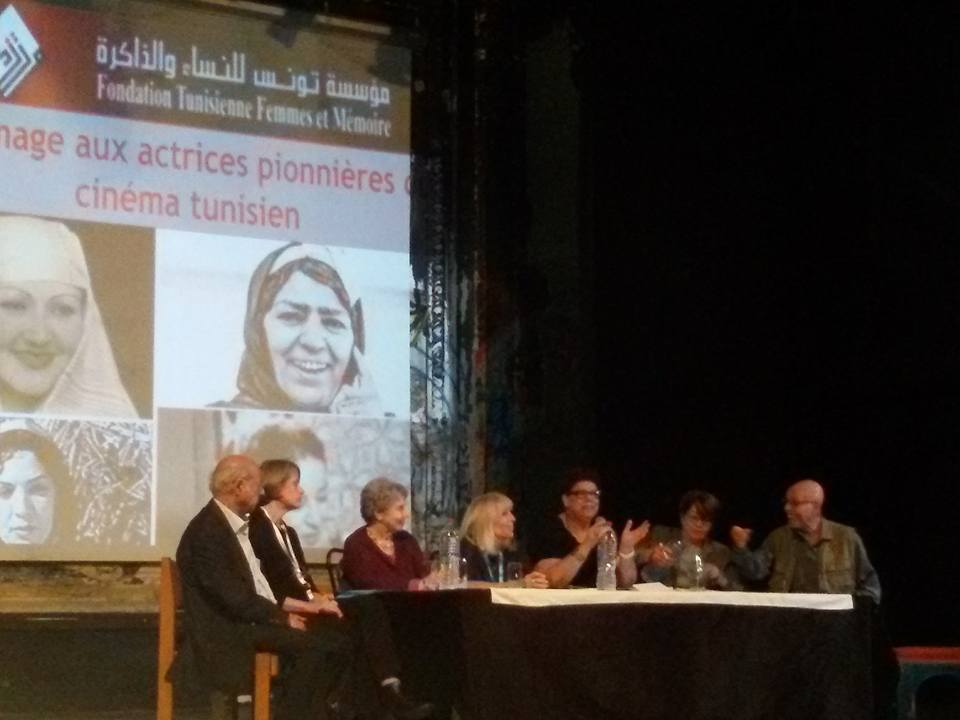
Noura Borsali hostes a tribute to the pioneering actresses of Tunisian cinema, organized by the FTFM in partnership with the JCC.

Borsali is known for her cultural commitment. From the 1970s, she was a member of the Tahar-Haddad do Cultural Club which she then became organizer, facilitator and moderator of some of her workshops mainly related to the Women in Tunisia (feminist circle) and the Maghreb cinema (film society).

Fervent about cinema, her critics were published by specialized magazines such as Africultures and Africiné. She was a member of the Tunisian Association for the Promotion of Film Criticism film, of which she was elected vice-president in June 2000 0and then president from May 2011 to June 2012. On several occasions she was part of juries of national film events such as the Kelibia International Amateur Film Festival and the Carthage Film Festival (CGC) and also international as the FIPRESCI prize of the Bari International Film Festival and the International Istanbul Film Festival. She was also a member of the Tunisian Commission for the Film Production Fund.

Interested about history, she published several interviews and studies on the History of modern Tunisia. In 2015, together with her friends, she created the Tunisian Foundation Women and Memory (FTFM), which she presided until her death.
