= Ahlem Belhadj =

Tunisian women's rights activist (1964–2023)

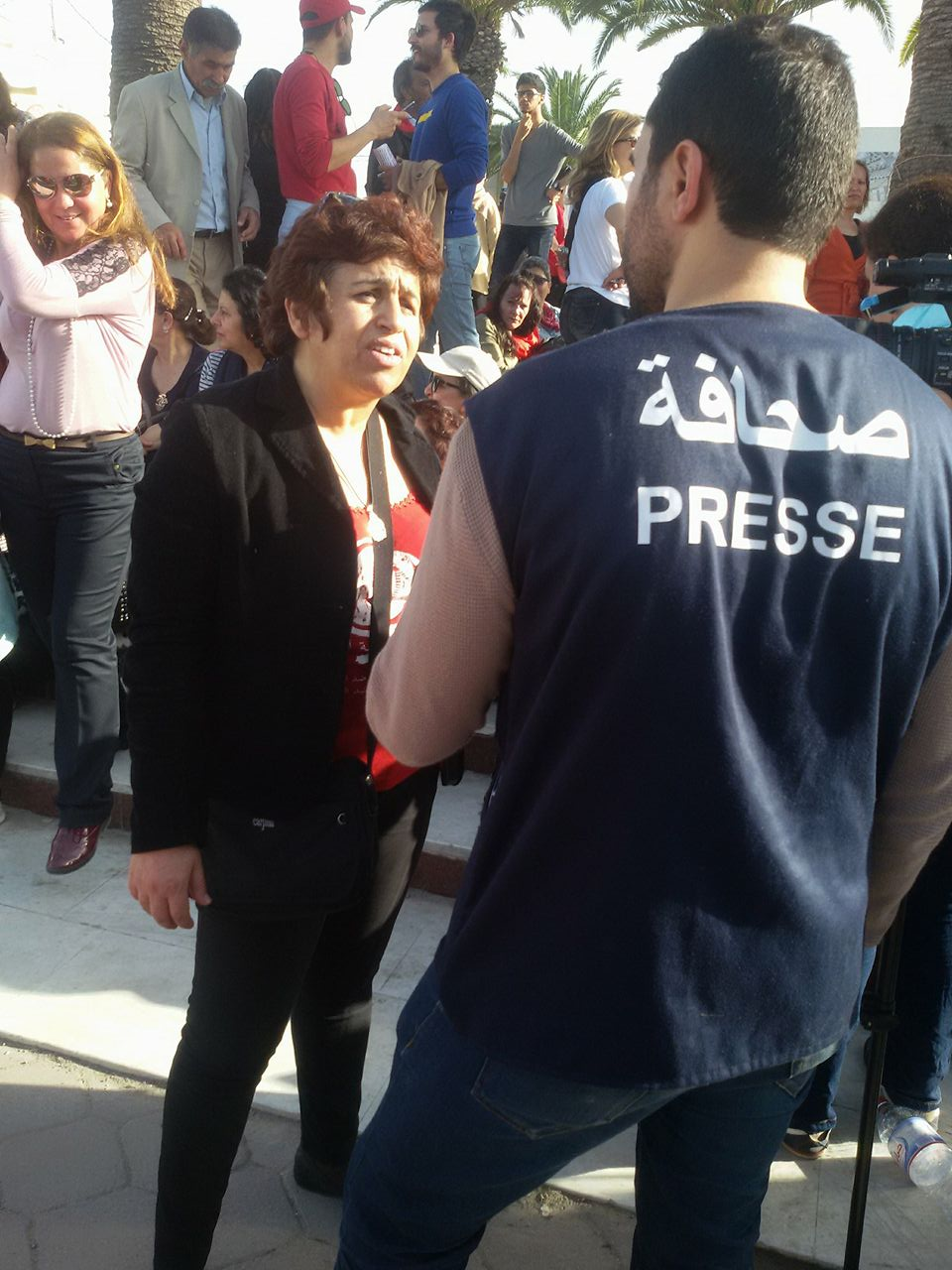
- Belhadj in 2018
- Born: 1964; Korba, Tunisia
- Died: 11 March 2023 (aged 58–59); Tunis, Tunisia
- Other name: Dr. Belhadj
- Occupation: Child psychiatrist
- Known for: Women's rights campaigns
- Children: 2

Ahlem Belhadj (Arabic: أحلام بالحاج, romanized: ʾAḥlām Bālḥājj; 1964 – 11 March 2023) was a Tunisian psychiatrist and women's rights campaigner. Serving at various times as president, chair, and director of the Tunisian Association of Democratic Women (ATFD), Belhadj campaigned for better treatment of women in Tunisia. She successfully fought for the right of women and children to apply for passports without permission of their husband or father. Belhadj led a march of thousands of women against President Zine El Abidine Ben Ali during the 2011 Tunisian Revolution. She was the 2012 winner of the Simone de Beauvoir Prize and placed 18th on Foreign Policy's 2012 list of global thinkers.

== Early life ==
Belhadj grew up in Korba, one of five siblings. Her father was a teacher and mayor of the town for 20 years. A keen athlete, she won many school prizes and competed for the Korba and Stade Nabeulien teams as well as the national team in the long jump and 100m. Belhadj studied medicine at the Medicine School of Tunis where she decided to become a child psychiatrist.

Belhadj worked at the child and adolescent psychiatry department, Mongi Slim Hospital, University of Tunis El Manar. Ahlem performed research in autism, genetics, early intervention, and family intervention. Her second field of interest was the evaluation and psychotherapy of child psychotraumatism.

Later, she became interested in politics. She took part in her first political march on 8 March 1983 (International Women's Day) and there met her future husband Brik Zoghlami, a lawyer who was in a Marxist revolutionary group.

Belhadj was married in 1993 and had two children. Her husband was forced to work in France due to the regime issuing an arrest warrant against him; he later served eight months in prison.

== Tunisian Association of Democratic Women ==
In 2004, Belhadj became president of the Tunisian Association of Democratic Women (ATFD). She continued to practice medicine and specialized in child psychiatry.

Belhadj was chair of the ATFD from 2011 to 2013 and campaigned for gender and social equality. Her interest in revolutionary politics began after enrolling in medicine school in Tunisia back in the 80's, when she participated in movements against Ben Ali's system, specially by defending women's rights and her freedom. During the Jasmine Revolution of 2011 she led marches of thousands of women against President Zine El Abidine Ben Ali; the revolution later led to the fall of Ali and Tunisia's first-ever democratic elections.

Belhadj campaigned for new laws to be put in place against domestic violence. In 2015 amendments that she campaigned for brought about the freedom of women and children to apply for their own passports; previously they had to have the permission of their husband or father. She was director of the ATFD by 2014. After elections that brought Islamist parties into power, Belhadj became concerned about the resurgence of conservative Islamist policies. She also complained of the disruption of ATFD meetings by government officials in the name of preserving "moral values".

Described as the "Arab Spring's Tunisian Heroine", she won the Simone de Beauvoir Prize and placed 18th on Foreign Policy's 2012 list of global thinkers.

Belhadj died on 11 March 2023, at age 59.
