= Dalenda Larguèche =

Tunisian historian (born 1953)

- دلندة لرقش
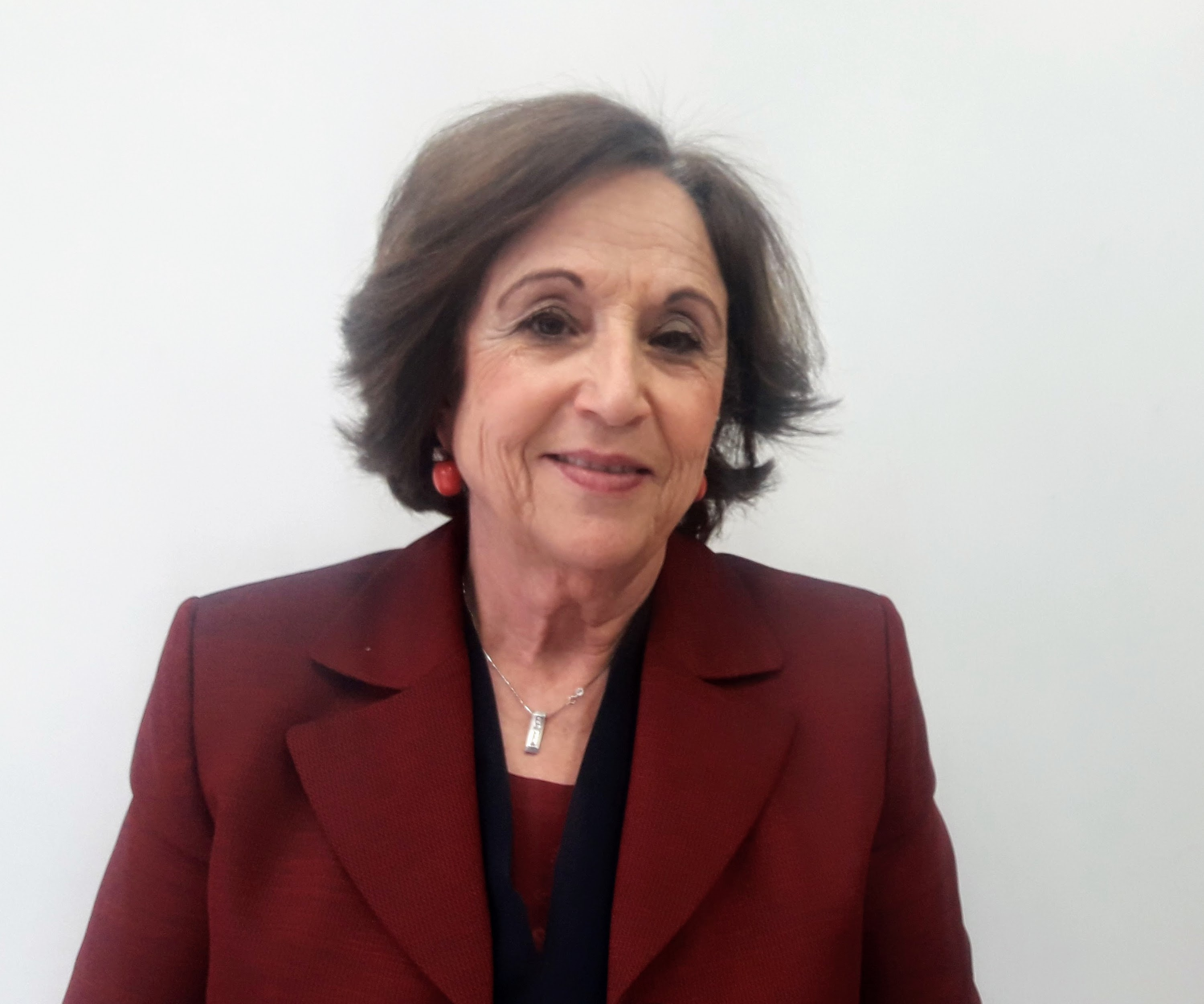
- Larguèche in 2018
- Born: 1953 (age 72–73); Monastir, Tunisia
- Occupation: Historian
- Spouse: Abdelhamid Larguèche

Dalenda Bouzgarrou-Larguèche (Arabic: دلندة لرقش; born 1953), better known as Dalenda Larguèche, is a Tunisian historian specializing in the early modern period and women in Islamic societies. She is also a longtime political activist, particularly focused on the rights of women and other marginalized people.

== Biography ==
Larguèche was born in 1953 in Monastir, Tunisia.

She joined the Tunisian Communist Party during a period when it was banned in the country, although the ban was lifted in 1981. She also became an activist with the Tunisian Association of Democratic Women and the Association of Tunisian Women for Research and Development.

Larguèche attended Tunis University, graduating in 1986 with a doctoral degree. She then became a professor of early modern history at Manouba University.

Her activism extended to her work as an academic. In the early 1990s, with the support of some of her colleagues, she launched and developed the study of women's history at Manouba University. Despite some resistance, the subject was introduced to the university's Department of Letters, Arts, and Humanities.

She has served on the scientific councils of Tunis University, Manouba University, the Laboratory of Regions and Heritage Resources of Tunisia, and the American Institute for Maghrib Studies. She also oversees the "Gender, Women, Society, and Culture" research team.

From 2011 to 2013, she served as director-general of the Center for Research, Studies, Documentation, and Information on Women (CREDIF). After being fired by Minister for Women's Affairs Sihem Badi and replaced with Rachida Tlili Sellaouti, she returned to the director-general role from 2016 to 2018.

She is married to the historian Abdelhamid Larguèche, with whom she has frequently collaborated on research, particularly on Tunisia's marginalized populations including prostitutes, Jews, Black Tunisians, and the poor.

== Awards and recognition ==
- CREDIF prize for the best work of French-language scientific research (2001)
- Book Prize from the Arab Maghreb Union (2007)
- CREDIF prize for the best scientific research on women and gender (2011)
- Officer of the Order of the Republic of Tunisia (2015)

== Selected works ==
=== In French ===
- Marginales en terre d’Islam (with Abdelhamid Larguèche), 1993
- Mémoire de femmes : Tunisiennes dans la vie publique, 1920-1960 (collective work), 1994
- Histoire des femmes du Maghreb : culture matérielle et vie quotidienne (editor), 2000
- Territoire sans frontières : la contrebande et ses réseaux dans la régence de Tunis au XIX^{e} siècle, 2001
- Femmes en ville dans le monde méditerranéen : passé et présent (editor), 2005
- Monogamie en islam : l’exception kairouanaise, 2011

=== In Arabic ===
- L’Histoire du Maghreb moderne à travers les sources (المغرب العربي الحديث من خلال المصادر) (with Abdelhamid Larguèche and Jamel Ben Taher), 2006
