= Yosra Frawes =

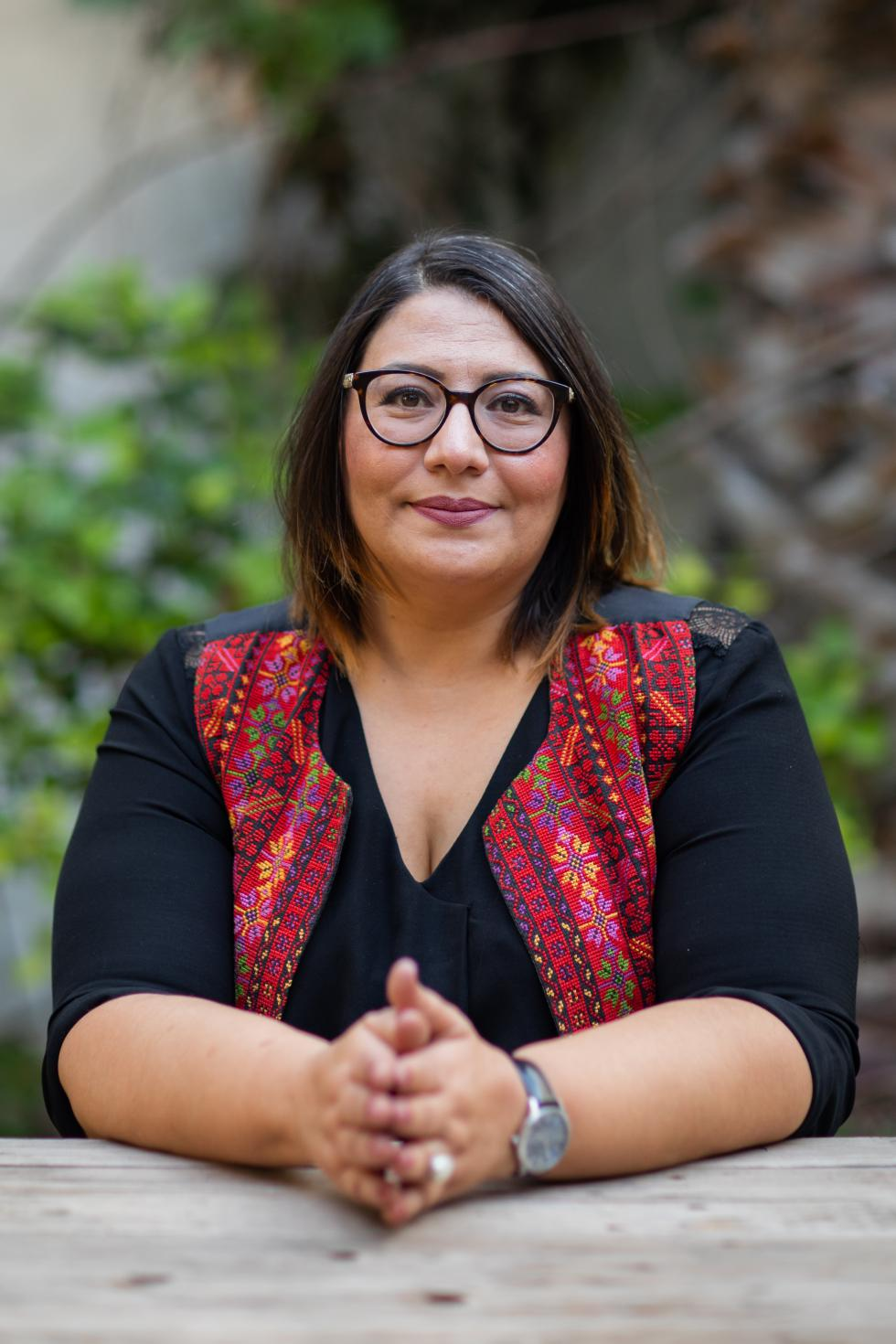
- Frawes in 2021

International Federation for Human Rights - Tunisia

Personal details
- Born: Djedeida (Tunisia)
- Party: Tunisian Association of Democratic Women; Tunisia
- Occupation: Lawyer
- Profession: Human right activist Politician

Yosra Frawes, born in Djedeida, is a Tunisian business lawyer, human rights activist and feminist.

== Biography ==
On the initiative of her teacher of civic education, she attended 1995 a debate on the role of Tunisian women in popular soap operas She then joined the youth club of the Tunisian Association of Democratic Women while campaigning in the General Union of Tunisian Students. In 2000, she launched a petition calling for gender equality in inheritance.

After the Tunisian revolution of 2011, Yosra joined the group of legal experts who verified the texts of the democratic transition within the Higher Authority for Realisation of the Objectives of the Revolution, Political Reform and Democratic Transition. Meanwhile, she devoted herself to denouncing human rights abuses and inequalities. She then worked on a bill of violence against women which was later adopted by the Assembly of the Representatives of the People in July 2017.

Distinguished by her activism for the protection of human rights she participated in the release of Jabeur Mejri, accused of attacking morality, defamation and disturbance of public order for having published caricatures of Muhammad on social networks in 2012. In addition, she constantly denounced the draconian overruns and defended women victims of violence.

She is a delegate of the International Federation for Human Rights in Tunisia and a Speaker in several conferences and seminars at the national, regional and international levels. From 1999 she was a member of the Tunisian Association of Democratic Women which she became president in April 2018. She joined the Association of Tunisian Women for development research (treasurer in 2002 where she took the position of training manager from 2005 to 2008.

== Publications ==
Yosra Frawes is the author, or co-author, of guides, notes and reports such as:

- Guide to 100 Steps to End Violence Against Women (co-author)
- Guaranteed human rights: from the Constitution to legislation (author)

She is also notable for her writings and her poetic essays. she has published several poems and articles about women contribution in Arabic literature.
