= National Union of Tunisian Women =

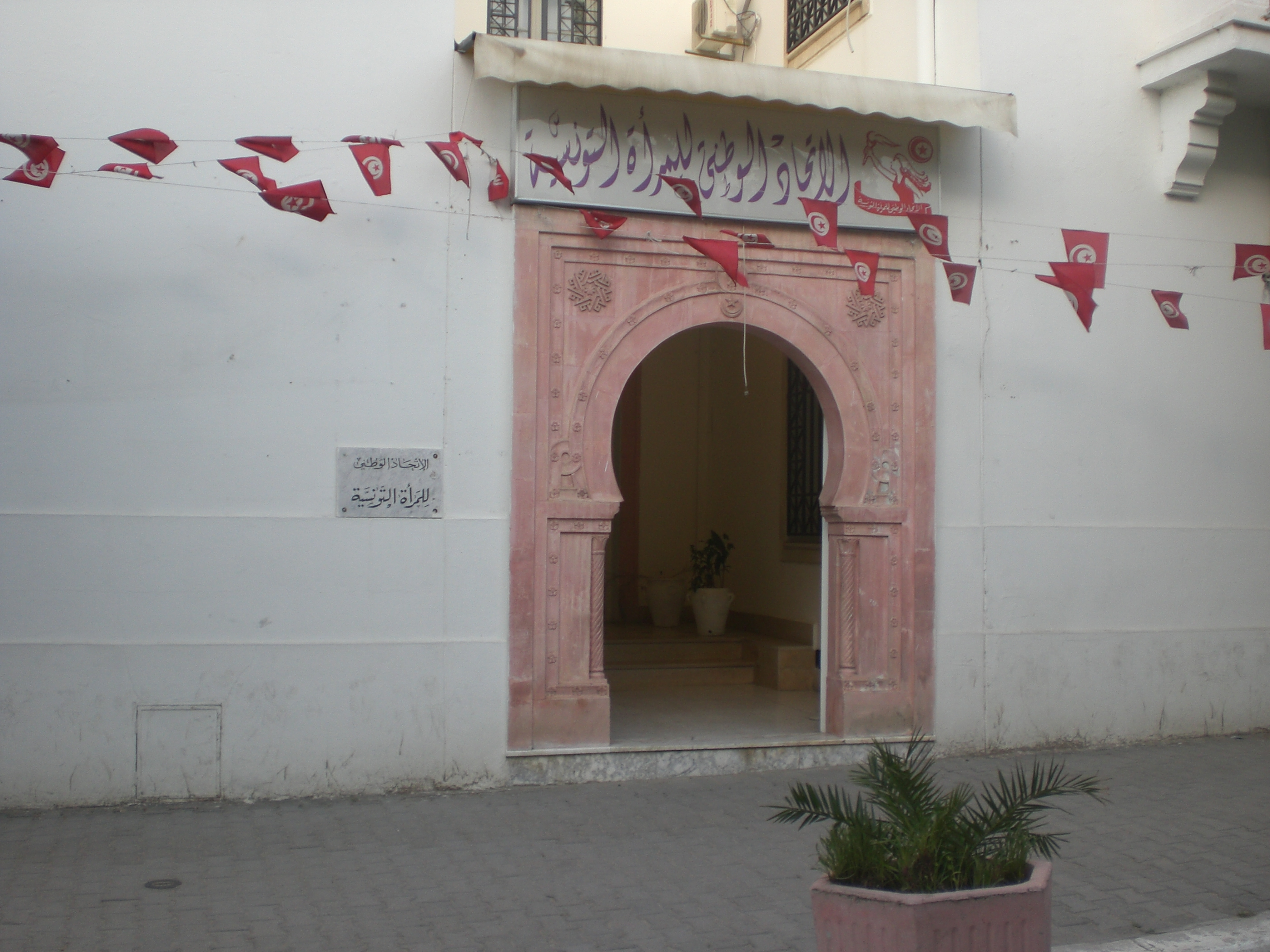
UNFT headquarters in Tunis

The National Union of Tunisian Women (Arabic: الاتحاد الوطني للمراة التونسية, romanized: al-Ittiḥād al-Waṭanī lil-Marʼah al-Tūnisīyah; French: Union Nationale de la Femme Tunisienne, UNFT) is a non-governmental organization in Tunisia founded in 1956. The current UNFT president is Radhia Jerbi.

The National Union of Tunisian Women was founded in 1956 by President Habib Bourguiba through the merge of the two previous women's organizations, Tunisian Union of Muslim Women (UMFT) and Union of Tunisian Women (UFT). It was founded after the independence of Tunisia, which was followed by the introduction of women's suffrage and the secular Personal Status Code.

The UNFT worked to inform women of the new Code of Personal Statue, which was a very radical reform in favor or women's rights, considered the most progressive family law in the Middle East after the Turkish Law of 1926.

The President also encouraged unveiling, and in a public ceremony in 1956, he carefully lifted the veil of a female political party member in order to symbolize the emancipation of women in the new nation.

The UNFT was also significant in raising awareness of family planning.

== See also ==
- Tunisian Association of Democratic Women
