= Dar Joued =

Religious women's prison in Tunis, Tunisia

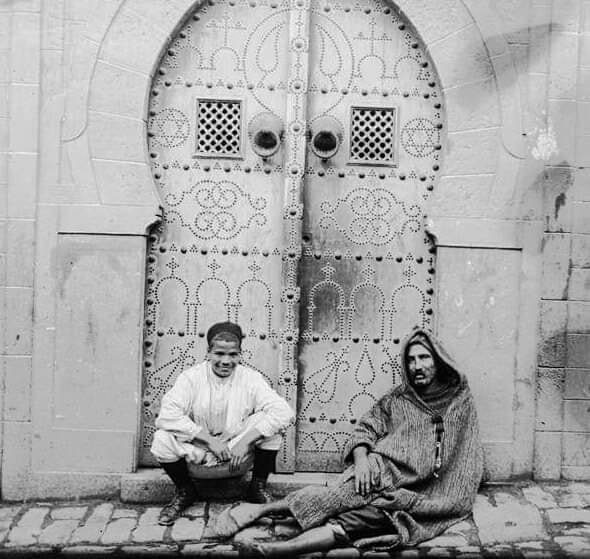
Two men sitting in front of the entrance to Dar Joued, c. 1950?

Dar Joued (Arabic: دار جواد, romanized: da:r juwa:d) was a religious women's prison in Tunis, Tunisia, housing women who had been ruled to be insubordinate or rebellious. Its existence spanned from the 16th century until the mid-20th century, reflecting and enforcing societal norms concerning gender roles and marital obedience within the Islamic legal framework of the time.

== History ==
Established in the 16th century, Dar Joued operated under a religious court system, adjudicating cases without the possibility of appeal. Women sent to Dar Joued were often accused by their husbands or male guardians of disobedience or rebellion and were judged by two judges, representing, respectively, the Hanafi school and the Maliki school of Islamic jurisprudence. The institution was part of a broader societal mechanism to regulate women's behavior and maintain traditional family structures. Habib Bourguiba's reforms, particularly the Code of Personal Status of 1956, led to Dar Joued's closure in 1957.

== Dar Joued in Popular Culture ==
The impact and historical significance of Dar Joued have been revisited in contemporary Tunisian culture, most notably through the work of director Selma Baccar. Her film "El Jaida" delves into the stories of women confined in Dar Joued, bringing attention to their struggles and resilience. The film draws on historical research and personal testimonies, highlighting the institution's role in the broader context of Tunisian society's evolution, especially regarding women's rights.

== Legacy ==
The closure of Dar Joued followed the enactment of the Code of Personal Status by Habib Bourguiba in 1956, which abolished practices like repudiation and polygamy and required mutual consent for marriage. This legal reform marked a pivotal moment in the advancement of women's rights in Tunisia, with Dar Joued's disappearance symbolizing a break from past oppressions and a step toward greater gender equality.
