= Jamila Mejri =

Tunisian poet (born 1951)

- جميلة الماجري
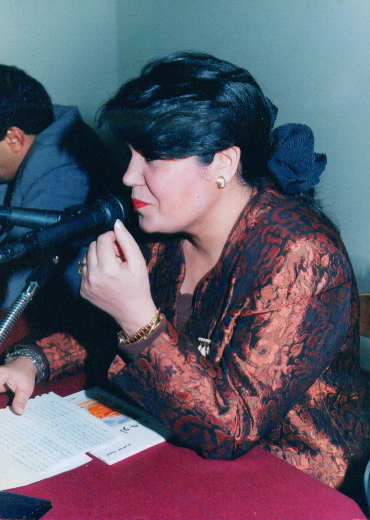
- Born: Jamila Mejri Soudani; 1951 (age 74–75)
- Writing career
- Genre: poetry
- Notable awards: Aboul-Qacem Echebbi prize

Jamila Mejri (Arabic: جميلة الماجري, born Jamila Mejri Soudani; 1951 in Kairouan) is a Tunisian poet.

She won the Aboul-Qacem Echebbi prize, in 2005 for her 38 poems, Dhakiratou Attaïer.

She is the first woman to be elected President of the Union of Tunisian Writers at the Congress of December 2008.
