= Amel Grami =

Tunisian academic

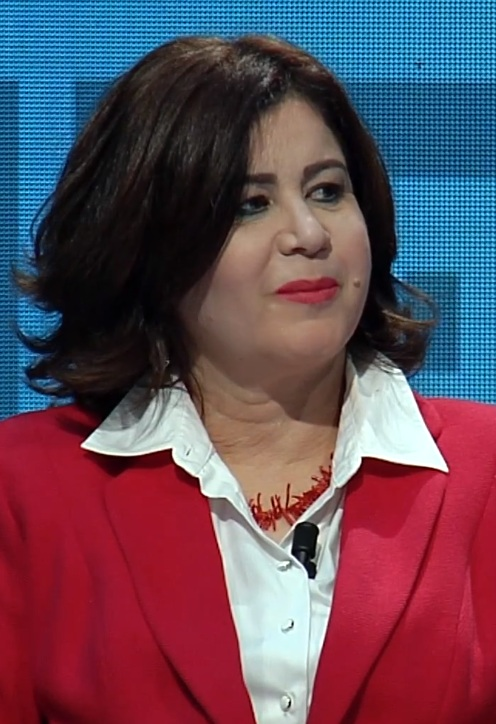
Amel Grami in 2016

Amel Grami (Arabic: آمال قرامي, romanized: Āmāl Qarāmī) is a Tunisian academic, writer, and women's rights activist.

Grami has worked as a professor of Islamic studies at Manouba University. She has advocated for Islamic modernism and Islamic feminism, and she argues that the Quran opposes heavy legal restrictions on women. She has been the subject of protest for her teachings on Islam and feminism, including an on-campus sermon in November 2011 that condemned her presence at the university.

In 2014, Grami criticized the 2014 parliamentary election for the limited number of women candidates, describing gender as a stronger determining factor in politics than political ideology. In 2016, Grami was denied a travel visa to Egypt when she attempted to attend a conference. In 2022, Grami was one of several figures to contest their inclusion on a list of individuals to engage in a dialogue with the President of Tunisia, saying that she did not agree to be included.
