= Faraj Hawwar =

Tunisian writer, novelist, and researcher

- Born: 12 February 1954 (age 72); Hammam Sousse, Tunisia
- Education: Bachelor's of French Language and Literature
- Alma mater: École Normale Supérieure in Tunisia
- Occupations: Writer; novelist; researcher
- Awards: Abu Al Qasim Al Shabi Award; Prix Littéraires COMAR D’OR

Faraj Hawwar (Arabic: فرج الحوار) (commonly spelled "Fredj Lahouar") is a Tunisian writer, novelist and researcher born in Hammam Sousse on 12 February 1954. He completed his primary and secondary education in Sousse, as a 1978 alumnus of École Normale Supérieure, Tunisia, majoring in French Language and Literature. He writes in both Arabic and French.

== Career ==
Hawwar is a Tunisian novelist and member of the Tunisian Writers Union since 1993. He writes novels in both Arabic and French, and stories and poetry in French. In 1985, he released his first novel Death, the Sea and the Rat (original: Al-mawt wa-al-baḥr wa-al-ǧurad̲), and now has over 16 novels.

Hawwar has written several monographs, including Writers’ Metaphors and Rhetoricians' References (original: Kināyāt al-udabāʼ wa-ishārāt al-bulaghāʼ), The Fragrant Meadows in Al Khatir’s Picnic (original: al-Rawḍ al-ʻāṭir fī nuzʹhat al-khāṭir), Writing Desire (original: kitābat al-raghbah) (a study on Georges Bataille’s works, in French, 2013), and the Dictionary of Tunisian Revolution (in French, 2018). He also translated The Anthology of Tunisian Short Stories (2008) and Anthology of Tunisian Novels (2009) from Arabic into French (in collaboration with Hafez al-Hadidi).

His doctoral thesis is on the issue of desire in the writings of Georges Bataille and he has undertaken extensive research on gender in French and Arab Islamic heritage.

== Novels ==
The following are some of his novels:

- The Conspiracy (original: al-muʼāmarah), Dar al-Ma'arif, Cairo (1992)
- Explanation of the Facts about Absence and Melancholy (original: at-tabayyān fi'l ghurba w'il ashjān) Dar al-Janub, Tunis 1996
- Ainsi Parlait San Antonio, L'Or du Temps, Tunis 1998
- The Body is a Banquet (original: al-Jasad walīmah), Dar Tabr Al Zaman, Tunisia (1999)
- La créature des abysses, Editions Saha, Tunis 1999
- Night Rituals (original: Ṭuqūs al-layl), Al-Kamel Verlag, Cologne (2008)
- The Cleansing (original: al-taṭhīr), Dar Zainab Publishing, Tunis (2019)

== Awards ==
- The Conspiracy won the Abu Al Qasim Al Shabi Award in 1992 and was ranked among the top 100 Arabic-language novels of the 20th century by the Arab Writers Union.
- Ainsi Parlait San-Antonio received a Prix Littéraire COMAR d'Or in 1999.
