= Code of Personal Status in Tunisia =

1956 law that greatly improved the status of women in Tunisia

Code of Personal Status (Tunisia)
- Enacted: August 13, 1956
- Commenced: January 1, 1957

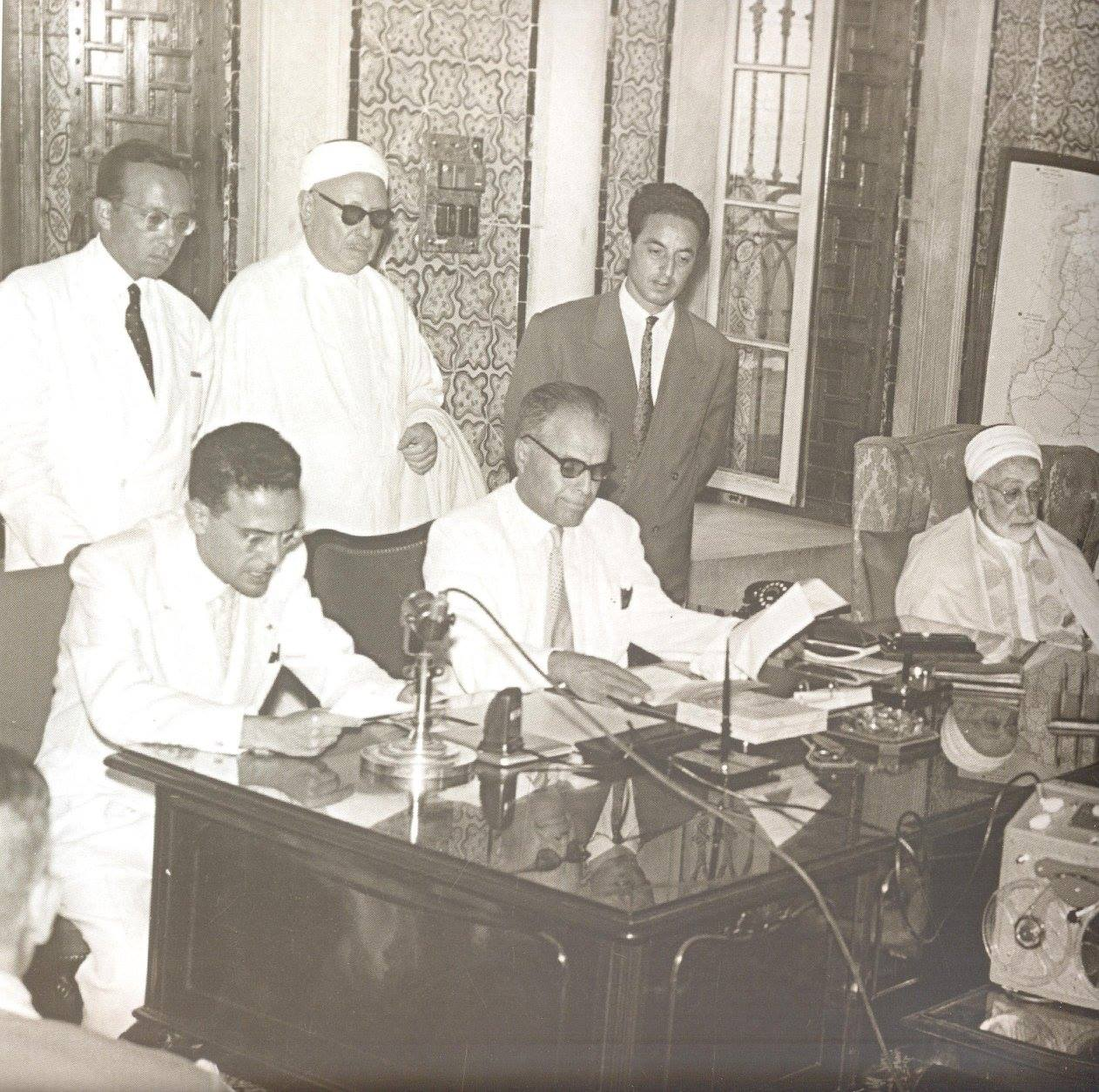
Proclamation of the judicial reforms, August 3, 1956. From left to right: Ahmed Mestiri, Habib Bourguiba, and Mohamed Abdelaziz Djaït. Standing behind Bourghuiba is Muhammad al-Tahir ibn Ashur

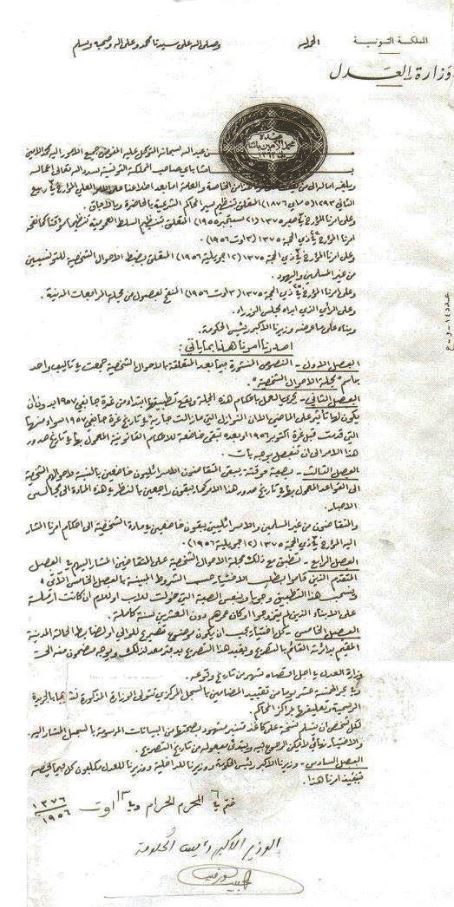
Original text of the Code of Personal Status, August 1956

The Code of Personal Status (CPS) (Arabic: مجلة الأحوال الشخصية) is a series of progressive Tunisian laws aiming at the institution of equality between women and men in a number of areas. It was promulgated by beylical decree on August 13, 1956 and came into effect on January 1, 1957. This Code is one of the most significant deeds of Habib Bourguiba, who was Prime Minister and later President.

The code outlawed polygamy, set minimum ages for marriage, required mutual consent for marriage, and allowed either spouse to file for divorce in secular court. Bourguiba's successor, Zine El Abidine Ben Ali, reaffirmed the government's commitment to the Code. He himself introduced modifications that reinforced it, in particular with the July 1993 amendment.

== Historical context ==
The feminist question is a recurring theme in Tunisia, more than in all the other countries of the Maghrib, and the country is from that point of view "atypical" of the region. It seems to affirm a distinctiveness which it has followed since the beylical period which, "on the eve of the institution of the French protectorate was going to engage in a process of reforms establishing its connection to society in a modern national perspective."

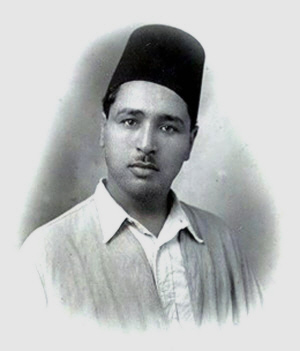
Tahar Haddad

As early as 1868, Hayreddin Pasha wrote "The Surest Way to an Understanding of the State of Nations" in Arabic. This explained that the future of Islamic civilization depends on its modernization. In 1897 Shayk Muhammad Snoussi published "The Flower's Blooming or a Study of Woman in Islam" in which he advocated the education of girls. Fifteen years later, Abdelaziz Thaalbi, Cesar Ben Attar and Haydi Sabai published "The Koran's Liberal Spirit" which urges the education of girls and the removal of the veil. In 1930, Tahar Haddad, himself influenced by the reformist current begun in the Nineteenth Century by Kheirredine Pasha, Ibn Ahmad ibn Abi Diyaf, Muhammad Snoussi, Salem Bouhageb, Mohamed Bayram V and other thinkers who all defended the concept of modernism, published "Our Women in Sharia and Society." He demonstrated there the possibility of compatibility between Islam and modernity. The arguments he presented there were subsequently adopted by Bourguiba in his speeches. Radhia Haddad, wrote in her autobiography "Woman's Talk" :

"On the eve of independence, the most ancient and the most blatant injustice was the condition of women."

Although Haddad's proposals were condemned in his time by conservatives, nearly all of his proposals were included in the drawing up of the Code, including obligatory consent for marriage, the establishment of a procedure for divorce and the abolishment of polygamy. The failure of Haddad to bring into effect his wishes while alive is registered in Habib Bourguiba's later success:

"He (Haddad) occupies an important place in the history of social and political ideas in Tunisia."

In the same period Shayk Mohamed Fadhel Ben Achour, who was mufti of Tunisia and rector of the University of Ez-Zitouna, issued a fatwa, result of a personal ijtihad. At the same time the reformist newspaper Ennahda published the poems of Aboul-Qacem Echebbi, who participated to a lesser extent than Haddad in the defence of the rights of women. In 1947, Muhammad Abdu'l Aziz Jait, former justice minister who was later opposed to the Code and author of a majallah codifying personal status and estate law, undertook an initial and timid effort to harmonize the doctrines of the Maliki and the Hanafi, majority in Tunisia, that ultimately had no result.

In November 1940, Muhammad Zarrouk founded the first francophone feminist magazine, Layla, which however ceased publication in July 1941, but whose name was taken up symbolically by Bashir Ben Ahmed who, on May 23, 1955, started a magazine "Layla Speaks to You"—later "Feminine Action"—in the fifth issue of his weekly "Action" (later "Africa Action" and finally "Young Action"). Lacking women, absent from Tunisian press of the period, the magazine folded, but Ben Yahmed had made the acquaintance of Dorra Bouzid, then a student in Paris, and recruited her to relaunch the magazine. On June 13, 1955, Bouzid, then the magazine's only woman, edited in its eighth issue an article signed with the pseudonym of Layla and entitled "Call For Emancipation Law." On the occasion of the promulgation of the Code, she wrote, on September 3, 1956 in a special double page of the 56th issue an article titled "Tunisian Women are Adults" with an editorial recalling the collaboration in its production of the two shayks Muhammad Abdu'l Aziz Jait and Muhammad Fadl Ben Achour. In 1959, Safia Farhat and Bouzid co-founded the magazine Faiza, which, although it ceased publication in December 1969, remained famous in the Maghrib and more generally in Africa, as the first Arab-African feminine francophone magazine.

== Text ==
The Code instituted that wali's permission is not a requirement for the validity of all marriages. Furthermore, it instituted an obligatory minimum age for marriages, fixed first at eighteen years for men and fifteen years for women, the precise text that: "Below this age marriage cannot be contracted, except by the special authorization of a judge who may not grant it, except for serious reasons and in the well understood interests of both spouses. In this same case, consent for the marriage of a minor must be given by the closest parent who must fulfil three conditions, namely being of sound mind, adult and masculine."

The Code also forbade the marriage of a man: "With his ancestors and descendants, with his sisters and the descendants to infinity of his sisters and brothers, with his aunts, great aunts and great great aunts" and "with the woman whom he has divorced three times." Polygamy, although rather marginal in the period, is likewise forbidden, even if the second union is not "formal:" "Whosoever being engaged in the bonds of matrimony shall contract another before the dissolution of the preceding shall be liable to a year's imprisonment and to a fine." Bourguiba referred to a sura of the Koran to justify this measure:

"We have abided by the spirit of the Holy Book... which indicates monogamy. Our decision in the matter contradicts no religious text and is found to be in agreement with mercy and justice and the equality of the sexes."

This sura states that: "It is permitted to marry two, three or four among the women who please you, but if you fear not being just towards them, then only one, or some slaves that you possess. This to the end of not committing injustice." For Bourguiba, the condition of equality between spouses being impossible to assure, prohibition of polygamy became therefore legitimate. And, provoking conservatives, he added:

"The defenders of polygamy would have to admit in a spirit of equality that the wife be polyandrous in the event of the husband's sterility.

The Code also prescribes that: "Each of the two spouses must treat the partner with kindness, live in good rapport and avoid all prejudice," thus abolishing the wife's obligation of obedience to her husband. At the same time, the text obliged the wife who was in possession of goods to contribute to the family's expenses, so that the husband not have powers of administration over the wife's possessions.

Until 1956, divorce remained the prerogative of the man who could unilaterally repudiate his partner by a simple declaration before two witnesses. The Code, to the contrary, instituted a divorce procedure that "could not take place except before a court" which decided "the dissolution of the marriage." This same court did not rule except in a case brought through the mutual consent of both spouses and in the case of the request of one of the partners as the result of harm of which that spouse was the victim. It is also stated that: "material harm would be recompensed (to the woman) in the form of a monthly alimony payment... to the level of life to which she was accustomed during married life, here including residence". Once more, Bourguiba justified himself by the decree of the Koran:

The Code also instituted the principle of the equality of men and women in relation to citizenship. Moreover, if a child did not possess his own goods, the necessary costs of his upbringing were predicated on those of the father.

== Previous political action ==
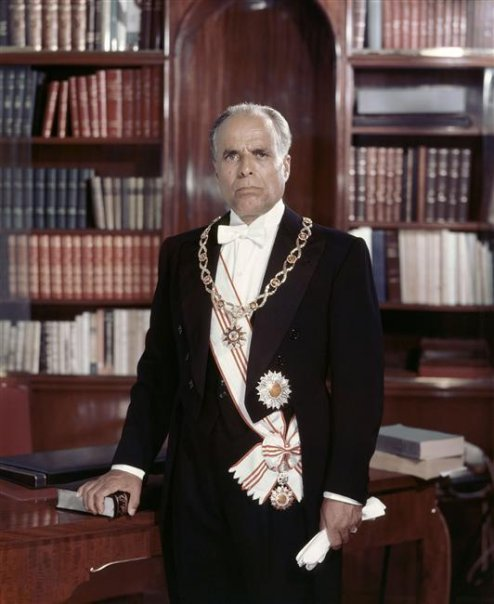
Official Photo of President Habib Bourguiba

Taking the lead in Tunisia's modernization campaign, Habib Bourguiba in each of his speeches found occasion to criticize sexist attitudes, opposing the hijab and appealing to science on the issue of virginity at marriage. Tunisian women hearing his call unveiled and often asked him to settle disputes with their husbands. His ruling always inclined in favour of women and "made him all through the long decade of the sixties their tireless defender."

It is necessary to know that Bourguiba always worshipped his mother, who died prematurely, according to the chief of state, in 1913. In several of his speeches, memory of her returned and the exhaustion born of the double function of the spouse and the mother contributed to his denunciation of the feminine condition in traditional Tunisian society. Although his declaration can be considered sincere—other expositions indeed demonstrate a certain hostility to the period's domestic tradition—it is to be recalled that his mother's memory played no fundamental role in his political positions concerning the feminine condition during the French protectorate.

In this context, on the eve of independence there did not really exist a political movement strictly based on the demand for the rights of women. Existing institutions sustained political parties, and although these rights were the subject of speeches, they were not then among political priorities. The Union of women and the Union of girls belonging to the Communist party agitated especially in the social and labour domains. As for the Muslim union and the cells destourian women created in 1951-1952, they did not begin to call for the right to vote and eligibility for office until 1955. These two rights became official on March 14, 1957 and Tunisian women voted for the first time in municipal elections in May 1959 and later in the presidential and legislative elections of November 1959. But the right to education remained the only one unanimously sought by feminine organizations. From this point of view, the Code was not promulgated under any feminist pressure, that, when it existed, was usually directed to other ideals.

== Pursuit of reforms ==
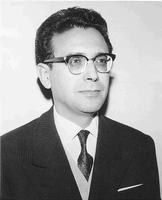
Ahmed Mestiri

On August 10, 1956, Prime Minister Bourguiba devoted an entire speech to the Code which was to be promulgated three days later. He described to as a radical reform which would make marriage a "state matter, an act that must be supervised by public law and society in its entirety." Drafted by fifteen jurists, the majority Arabic speakers, under the supervision of the Justice Minister, Ahmad Mestiri, the Code was voted in the wake of independence and even before the drafting of the constitution. Assembled in twelve books, it gave to women a unique status in the Arab-Muslim world. Proclaimed on March 20, 1956, then promulgated on August 13 of the same year (Muharram 6, 1376) by Lamine Bey's beylical decree, the Code came into force on January 1, 1957. This act registered a series of reforms touching other aspects of the impact of religion on society. Thus, on May 31, public charitable foundations (waqfs) were suppressed, as private ones would be on July 1, 1957. On August 3, secular courts replaced religious courts as the high court for the application of Islamic law, while the law of September 27, 1957 closed the rabbinical court of Tunis. Their members were integrated into the body of common law magistrates.

On January 10, 1957, the wearing of the veil at school was forbidden. According to the decrees of March 29, 1956 and October 1, 1958, Zitouna University was closed as were the other madrasahs, the official goal being "to progressively suppress all previous types of teaching, unadapted, hybrid or outdated." (speech delivered by Bourguiba at Tunis on October 15, 1959). However, more than this modernization concern, there existed as well the need to destabilize an importance source of political opposition based on religion.

In the years following independence, women obtained the right to work, to move, to open bank accounts and to establish businesses without the permission of their husbands being sought. July 1, 1965 saw a law allowing abortion as much for social as for therapeutic reasons. Women had been encouraged to limit the number of their children since the beginning of the 60s and the contraceptive pill was rendered freely accessible throughout the country, annulling thereby the French law that in 1920 outlawed all means of contraception. A law of March 1958 imposed civil marriage and on December 14, 1960, another law limited to four the number of children benefiting from family allowances. Bourguiba founded the Union of Tunisian Women in 1956 entrusting to it leadership in favourable publicity for his feminist policy. During a speech delivered on December 26, 1962, Bouguiba stated:

"Work contributes to the emancipation of women. By her work a woman or a girl assures her existence and becomes conscious of her dignity."

In practise, on September 14, 1965, Tunisia ratified the International Labour Organization's Convention number 111 concerning discrimination in the matter of employment and profession. Later, in 1968, ratification of the ILO's convention number 100 instituted equality of treatment in employment of men and women for work of equal value. These measures added to co-education in schools and as a consequence the entry of more and more young women into the workplace, involving the decline of marriage and of births of which the target was 46 per cent in 1966 and 30 per cent in 1971. Muhammad Baraket and Domenic Tabutin estimate that two-thirds of the reduction in births during the period 1966-1975 is the demographic consequences of these measures. In 1980, Tunisia's level of demographic growth was among the lowest in the Southern countries and is found to be the lowest of the Arab world. This rate was 2.2 children per woman in 1998 and 1.73 children in 2007. Radhia Haddad recognizes Bourguiba's merits in these transformations:

"If all countries have finished, one day or the other, in freeing themselves from foreign invaders, none, and surely no Arab Muslim country, has dared a social revolution to such an extent."

== The Code and religion ==
This series of reforms, although it fell short of the customary norm, which can be illustrated by the introductory adoption in 1958 unknown in Muslim lands and from the full adoption in 1959, never breaks with religion. Bourguiba is declared to be a mujtahid and not a Kemalist, because he reproached the Turkist leader as too removed from society. Since 1956, all responsible authorities, notably the Minister of Justice, Ahmad Mestiri and the different directors of UNFT, recalled on many occasions that the Code and successive laws were not opposed to Islam, but registered in the context of a reform of society "inside Islam." Furthermore, each of the measures taken in drawing up the Code was accompanied by justification provided from a liberal interpretation of Muslim law. During a speech delivered in Tunis on February 8, 1961, Bourguiba expressed his opinion on reason's domination above all other means of thought:

"There are still people who do not conceive that reason must apply to all things in this world and command all human activity; for these people certain domains, that of religion in particular, must escape the ascendancy of the intelligence. But then, in behaving this way one destroys at one blow the fervour and veneration that we all owe to the sacred. How admit this ostracism against reason? How abase ourselves to this functioning of an intelligent animal?"

Nevertheless, we are forced to testify that Bourguiba's Tunisia could no more be called secular than Ben Ali's or the rest of the Arab Muslim states, for more than a neutrality of orientation and the religious freedom of the state, secularism implies the autonomy of public and religious institutions. The reality is that the institutional presence of Islam in Tunisia, although strictly circumscribed, is truly a constant reference, implicit or explicit, legitimizing the regime's direction. Certainly, Tunisian public services are accessible to all without distinction of creed and the constitution guarantees religious freedom, so long as it does not threaten public order, but Islam remains the state religion, to the extent that it is said it is obligatory for the president of the republic to be able to assert it.

== Conservative reaction ==
In this context, presidential feminism remains ambiguous, as is illustrated by the speech delivered during the UNFT's third congress, held between December 20–29, 1962, in which he declared that he had to protect the family and guarantee to man the faculty of being its head. The policy of Bourguiba lost its vitality in the 1970s. This absence of new reforms can be explained in different ways: the deterioration of the president's health, the delayed reaction of conservatives remaining reserved in the course of preceding decades and the resistance of society shaken to its foundations. At the same time, power desired the destabilization of the Marxist left and encouraged the founding of the Association for the Preservation of the Koran in January 1968 which contributed to the birth of the Islamist party Ennahda.

Also, the silence of the Code concerning marriage between a Muslim woman and a non Muslim man, since 1969, is interpreted by most judges as a recognition of the prohibition decreed by Muslim law in the matter. This reasoning was approved on November 5, 1973 by a circular of the minister of justice who to, "stay away from the negative sides of the West," prohibited marriages between Muslims and non Muslims and who judged void marriages in which the non Muslim husband had not converted to Islam and where a certificate of conversion was not provided. Courts during this period often interpreted the Code in a restrictive manner, refusing, for example, all right of inheritance for non Muslim women in religiously mixed marriages. Bourguiba himself yielded to the conservatives' wishes and in 1974 refused the pressure of his entourage and the majority of his government wanting to modify the law concerning equality in succession, which had instituted the equality of the sexes in relation to inheritance. Indeed, on this issue he could not refer to the Koran to justify himself, as the text is clear: "To sons, a part equal to that of two daughters." In 1976, at the UNFT's sixth congress, he openly declared that: "It is not necessary that woman exercise remunerative activities outside her home. He seems to renounce one of the principles of his modernization policy.

The 1980s are characterized in the same line through an immobility in terms of feminist reforms, with the exception of some advances not negotiable at the beginning of the decade: law no. 81-7 of February 18, 1981 entrusting to the widow mother the upbringing of minor children and favouring women in divorce cases. Moreover, on November 1, 1983, Bourguiba named two women ministers, Fathia Mzali to the Ministry of the family and of the Advancement of Women and Souad Yaacoubi to Public Health.

== Policy of Zine el Abidine Ben Ali ==
At the end of 1987, Zine el Abidine inherited a society shared between conservatives, who urged modification of the Code in a regressive sense, and modernists who wished its continuance to symbolize Tunisia's anchorage in modernity. The new president provided proof of an extreme prudence, seeing that this is the connection that a good part of public opinion based itself in forming its judgment on the new president. During his first months in power, he put into place interruptions of television and radio broadcasts to broadcast the call to the five daily prayers and reopened Zitouma University, all while criticizing Bourguiba's secular "drift. and while glorifying Tunisia's "Arab-Islamic" identity. At the beginning of March 1988, the daily Assabah announced that an amendment of the Code aiming at the prohibition of the adoption of children was under consideration, and this provoked the reaction of forty academics of all political orientations who circulated a petition calling for, "the necessary separation of Islam and politics." On the morrow, March 19, Ben Ali, during a televised address, publicly asserted his support for the Code.

"There will be no challenge and no abandonment of that which Tunisia realized to the benefit of women and the family".

Nevertheless, the feminine condition was not then among his priorities and one finds in his actions the same political ambiguity as that which existed with Bourguiba.

== Prise de conscience ==
It was not until leaving 1989, once that the connection with Islamists was broken, that a new modernist discourse took its place. Women were then called upon to characterize this change: official receptions have been mixed since 1992 and ministers and senior civil servants were encouraged to attend accompanied by their spouses. the new First Lady, Leïla Ben Ali, made more and more public appearances, and, as a spokesperson for her husband, gave regular speeches on the role of women in the country. Putting this change into practice could equally be illustrated by the creation in 1991 of the Centre for Research, Studies, Documentation and Information on Woman and setting up at the ministerial level a national commission "Women and Development," charged with studying the role of women in development in the context of the preparation for the Eighth Economic Plan (1992–1996). In 1991 a law made compulsory the education of all children.

On August 13, 1992, on the occasion of National Woman's Day, Ben Ali gave a speech renewing Bourguiba's modernism in which he stated: "The rehabilitation of woman, the recognition of her gains and the consecration of her rights in the context of religious values to which our people are proud to adhere." The reference to Islam, become almost ritual, even if there was also added the memory of the ancient Carthaginian past of the country in insisting on its cultural diversity, becomes more subdued by referring to speeches given between 1987 and 1989. returning to this speech, three major ideas dominate: praise of achieved and irreversible modernity, recognition of known societal advances, such as the passing of the extended family for the nuclear family, and the necessity to put into practice the advances in legal texts. Declaring that he was "convinced of the aptitude of women to assume the highest duties in the heart of the state and society," he announced the creation of a state secretariat charged with women and the family and the nomination of a number of superior women to cabinet. He recognized on this occasion that the equality of the sexes did not yet fully exist and foresaw future improvements.

"We reaffirm here our support for these achievements and our determination to protect them and to enhance them."

== July 12, 1993 amendment ==
Reforms were carried out in 1993. Although all feminist projects seeking clear recognition of the two sexes were not carried to term, reforms inclined towards a sharing of authority between the two spouses instead of the exclusive authority of the father. Amendment no. 93-74 of July 12, 1993 modified the Code giving wives the right to transfer her patrimony and nationality to children to the same extent as husbands, even if she was married to a foreigner, on the sole condition that the father has given his approval. Other measures consecrated the participation of the mother in the conduct of business concerning children and the obligatory consent of the mother for the marriage of her minor child. Furthermore, women acquired the right to represent their children in several judicial procedures, to open and to manage a savings account for their benefit. Furthermore, the text makes it obligatory for spouses to be treated with "kindness" and to participate in the management of the home. Until then women had to accept the husband's prerogative. Finally, another prescription annulled the privilege of paternal grandparents to receive support payments for children. It made maternal grandparents equally entitled, eliminating the concept of the patriarchal family.

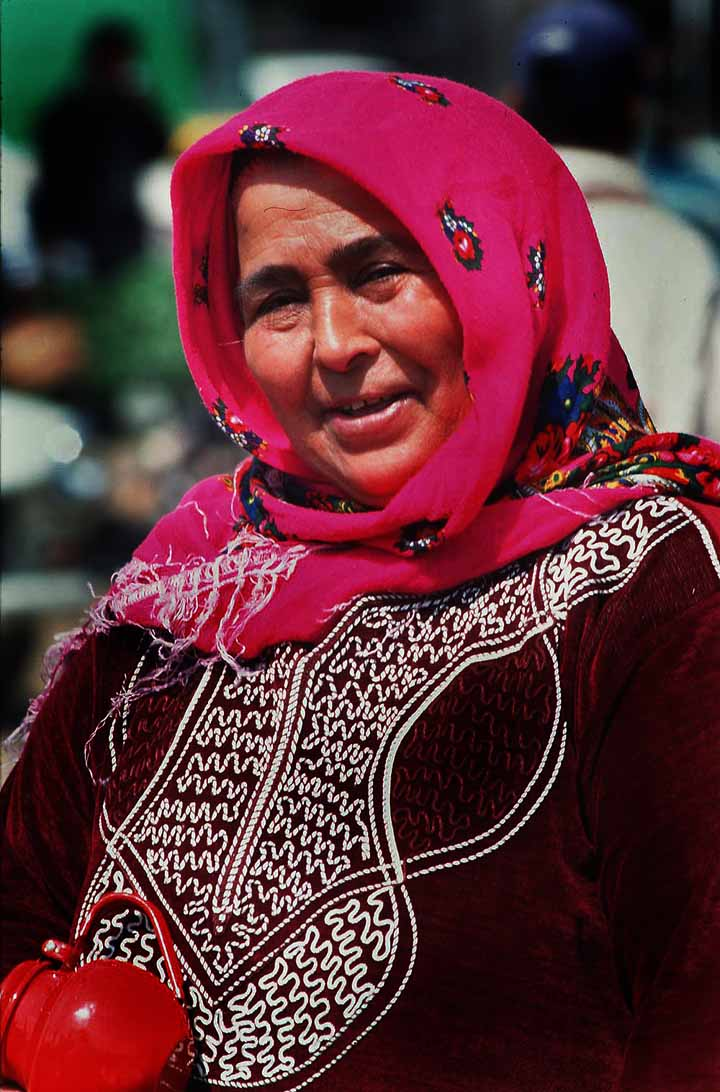
Old woman wearing hijab

Later, a second series of provisions reinforced the protection of women in regard to men in repressing spousal violence more rigorously and in instituting alimony payments and in enforcing this from divorced husbands seeking to shirk this responsibility. In connection with profession, a new article of the labor code, no. 93-66 of July 5, 1993 reaffirmed that: "There can be no discrimination between men and women in the application of the dispositions of the Code."

In 1995, other legislative innovations were voted in the allocation of the goods at the heart of a couple, recognizing the fact that the composition of the goods was made by two spouses and in divorce cases women could not be excluded in the division of joint inheritances. During the presidential election, Ben Ali's program had the slogan, "Women's perspectives renewed."

== Current situation ==
In the matrimonial domain, Tunisia remains often considered as a state open to the advances of the modern world. We should know that Tunisia celebrates two days dedicated to women: March 8, International Woman's Day and August 13, anniversary of the Code's promulgation which became a holiday, "National Woman's Day." On the occasion of the fiftieth anniversary of the Code, the president announced two legal projects which were adopted by the Chambers of Deputies in May 2007. The first strengthened the residence law to the benefit of mothers caring for children and the second harmonized the minimum marriage age to eighteen years for both sexes; the mean marriage age had reached 25 for women and 30 for men.

Concretely, Tunisian women are very involved in society, as they represent 58.1 per cent of students in higher education. They work in all trades, in the army, in civil and military aviation and in the police. They represent 72 per cent of pharmacy workers, 42 per cent in medicine, 27 per cent of magistrates, 31 per cent of lawyers and 40 per cent of university professors. In total, in 2004 they constituted 26.6 per cent of the work force, although in 1989 they had only represented 20.9 per cent and a mere 5.5 per cent in 1966. Furthermore, from 1999 to 2004 job creation grew 3.21 per cent for women, with an average of 19,000 created each year. Moreover, the illiteracy rate of women ten years and older declined from 96.6 per cent in 1956 to 58.1 per cent in 1984 to 42.3 per cent in 1994 to 31 per cent in 2004; the masculine rate in 2004 was 21.2 per cent. This is explained primarily by the fact that the number of girls per one hundred boys in primary school was 52 in 1965 and 83 in 1989. Furthermore, in the absence of the equity law, they represented 14.89 per cent of the members of government, 22.75 per cent (43 of 189) of the deputies of the House elected on October 24, 2004, 27.06 per cent of municipal councillors and 18 per cent of the members of the economic and social council. In addition, between ten thousand and fifteen thousand of them are business leaders. Nevertheless, unemployment affects women disproportionately, 16.7 per cent in 2004 compared to 12.9 per cent for men.

== Modernist will or political necessity ==
In Tunisia, the pursuit of political feminism is so very necessary as it constitutes a main argument in the country's favourable image in the West. Indeed, although economic growth was not negligible, it did not match other North African countries like Morocco. The suppression of free expression and of political opposition tarnishes the country's reputation abroad. The feminine condition is an area in which Tunisia under Bourguiba, as under Ben Ali, can claim its distinctiveness. Collette Juilliard-Beaudan thinks that Tunisian women "cease to choose a democratic form, (they) prefer secularism." And this kind of propaganda succeeds in the West because the country under Bourguiba's administration profited from a solid reputation as a civil and secular republic in a region more often composed of military dictatorships and religiously dependent monarchies, although the Code itself was promulgated in an authoritarian manner, as it wasn't the object of public debate or of consideration in a constituent assembly.

On February 9, 1994, "Tunisian Women's Day" was organized by the French senate under the title "Tunisia, an Assumed Modernity." Soon after a debate held in June 1997 at the European Parliament on the situation of the rights of Tunisian women, some Tunisian women were sent to Strasbourg to give Europe another view of their country. There followed then a series of favourable articles in the French press on the situation of women in Tunisia. In October, 1997, during Ben Ali's official visit to France, defenders of the Tunisian regime produced the status of women in dismissing criticism from organizations promoting human rights.

"Is the Tunisian regime feminist from political necessity and pleaded seemingly hollowly to mask its democratic deficit, or from modernist conviction?"

== Legal and social difficulties ==
The Code, nevertheless, has known many difficulties arising from Tunisian society. Thus, the dowry, although it does not constitute a cause for divorce in cases of default payment, still exists, the husband's home is the only one that may be considered the family residence and inheritance is completely unequal, as sharia grants to men a share double that of women (one of the rare cases where Islamic law is applied in Tunisia). Despite several efforts, Bourguiba could not impose the equality of the two sexes in this area, due to the enormous strength of the resistance from the religious leaders. He was thus limited to introducing measures against abuses. Today, donations from living parents to daughters are considered a way to avoid the legal inequality of daughters to inherit. However, in perusing "the ways and means of permitting the promotion and strengthening the achievements of women without altering our Arab Muslim identity," Ben Ali on August 13, 1993, fixed the limits he considered impassable:

The Tunisian minister in charge of women and the family on February 9, 1994, affirmed for her part in the French senate and taking some liberties with history:

"When Bourguiba promulgated the Code, he did so in the name of Sharia and Islam."

He managed not to attack equality of the sexes concerning inheritance directly, the Code continuing to consider man the head of the family and expressing the fact that spouses must fulfil their conjugal duties "conforming to usage and custom" which were systematically to the advantage of the masculine interests. Besides, it is not always easy to apply laws in a rural milieu where girls are still restricted compared to boys.

In August 1994, during a seminar devoted to women and the family, ATFD denounced the ambiguity of power and the use of religion to regulate the condition of women in the country, criticizing chiefly "the patriarchal oppression of women. In the end, women striving to oppose official speech were quickly called to order, notably by a press rigorously controlled by the authorities. In this context, the film maker Moufida Tlatli, famous for her film "The Silences of the Palace" (1994) was heavily criticized in the magazine "Realities" for having shown her scepticism on the supposed feminism of Islam during a television broadcast in October 1994. On August 13, 2003, on the occasion of the 47th anniversary of the Code, the Tunisian League for Human Rights connected to the ATFD stated:

"We consider that the complete equality of women and men remains a basic right."

== Opposition from religious leaders ==
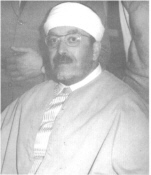
Portrait of Shayk Muhammad Fadl Ben Achour

Relying in part on the support of Shayk Muhammad Fadl Ben Achour, who defended the Code's provisions as constituting the possible interpretation of Islam," a large number of religious authorities prudently fell silent or denounced the Code. This opposition which considered the Code "violated Islamic norms" constituted and included several figures, of which Muhammad Abdu'l Aziz, wrongly considered one of the inspirers of the Code, who judged the Code "too remote from Sharia precepts."

On August 20, 1956, this last sent a letter to Ahmed Mestiri, in which he called for revision of certain articles of the Code, of which those related to the prohibition of polygamy and the creation of a procedure for divorce. This complaint forced Bourguiba to intervene, publicly and by name. On September 7, he asked members of the religious courts for their opinions concerning the Code's conformity with religious law. On September 14, thirteen members of the higher court published a fatwa, in which they affirmed that the Code contained elements judged opposed to the Koran, to the Sunna and to the Ijma. they were almost all dismissed or forced to retire. Imams delivering speeches opposing the Code and shaykhs signing petitions or articles criticizing it were arrested. Bourguiba later addressed them in a speech:

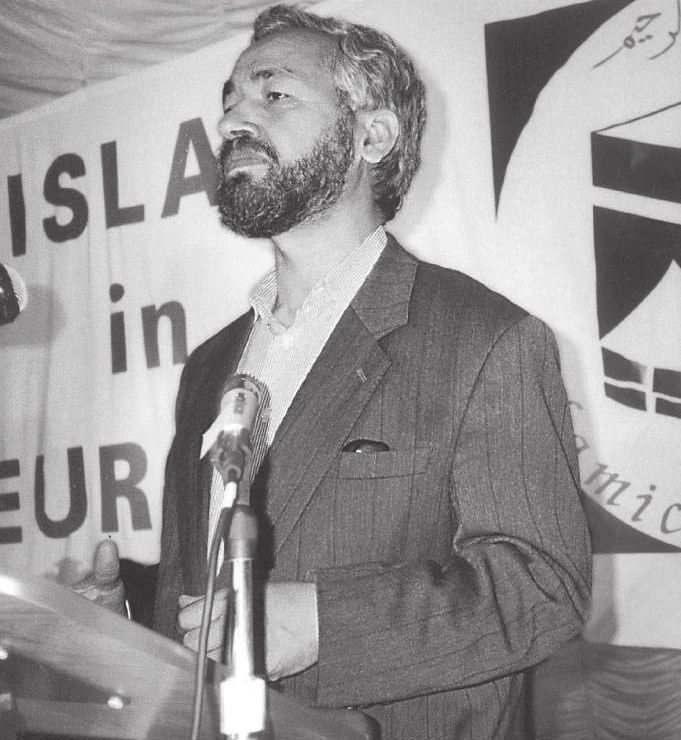
Rached Ghannouchi in a meeting

"As you, I am Muslim. I respect this religion for which have done everything so that this Islamic country not be in colonial humiliation. However, concerning my duties and responsibilities, I am qualified to interpret religious law."

This forced the religious authorities likewise to interpret the Koran in a way that accepted the fact that women could receive an education and participate in the social life of the country. The majority of the religious leaders had benefiting from their own daughters being advantaged by the changes in society. Ben Ali later granted a presidential pardon to Rached Ghannouchi, freed on May 14, 1988. Under government pressure he expressed confidence in the president and recognition that the Code represents, "In its entirely a fitting means to organize family relations." Nevertheless, Islamists continued their project to annul the Code and this so well that its previous acceptance constituted an acceptable condition for the legislation of political parties which had not been in accord with Ennahda.

Moreover, certain mentalities take longer to change. The issue of virginity at marriage and the influence of religious preachers castigating on Middle Eastern television networks the Western way of life played an important role in this debate. The hijab, little in use, made its appearance in the 2000s as a return to a mythical Arab Islamic authenticity, the influence of foreign television networks and the context following the attacks on September 11, 2001 could constitute a complementary explanation. As for the jurist, Yadh Ben Achour Achour, he explained in "Politics, Religion and Law in the Arab World" (1992) that "The Tunisian woman is still entangled in too many archaisms and suffers too violently the effects of social anomie to be able to benefit fully from Bourguiba's reforms."

== Popular culture ==
The Code formed the theme of an Arabic language documentary "Fatma 75" (1975) by Salma Baccar and produced by the anonymous Tunisian Society for the Production and Distribution of Films. It told the story of the evolution of the condition of women in Tunisia through three periods: the period 1930-1938 which ended with the creation of UNFT, the period 1938 to 1952 which induced two struggles for the emancipation of women and for the independence of the country and the period following 1956 with the achievements in that which concerns the Code.

The Code also features prominently in Baccar's 2017 film El Jaida. The 2017 film explores the institution of Dar Joued, a prison for disobedient women that was closed in 1957 as a result of Bourguiba's reforms.
