= Noura Bensaad =

Tunisian writer

- نورا بن سعد
- Born: Bizerte, Tunisia
- Occupation: Writer • Novelist

Noura Bensaad (Arabic: نورا بن سعد, romanized: Nūrā ben Saʿd) is a Francophone Tunisian writer who has been called the "Tunisian master of the short story." She was born in Salammbo (a district of Carthage), Tunisia, to a Tunisian father and a French mother. She attended university in Binzerte and graduated with a degree in French literature.

== Career ==
Bensaad is the author of two novels and two short story collections. Her "exquisite" short stories are known for their Mediterranean settings and "dreamlike" atmospheres, in which she exhibits her characters' hopes and disappointments.

An excerpt of her novel, Quand ils rêvent les oiseaux (When Birds Dream), was included in the 2010 Banipal issue on Modern Tunisian Literature, translated into English by Lulu Norman. Her short story "L’étranger et la vieille dame," translated into English by Roland Glasser, was included in the Words Without Borders issue on literature by Tunisian women.

== Works ==
- (2016) Bir El Abd
- (2009) Quand ils rêvent les oiseaux
- (2004) Mon Cousin Est Revenu
- (2002) L'immeuble de la rue du Caire
