= Najwa Al-Rayyahi =

Tunisian writer and academic (born 1962)

Najwa Al-Rayyahii (born December 2, 1962, in Tunis) is a Tunisian writer and academic. She is as a lecturer at the Department of Arabic Language, Faculty of Humanities and Social sciences in Tunis.

== Education ==
She obtained a Bachelor of Arts from the Montfleury Institute in Tunis in 1983, then she obtained a professorship in Arabic language and literature from the Faculty of Arts in Manouba in 1987; she also obtained a certificate of competence in research from the Faculty of Arts in Tunis in 1988 with research entitled: “Artistic styles and their implications in the novel Ahlam Shahrazad by Taha.” Hussain". Afterwards she obtained a degree in depth in research, and a doctorate in a third stage from the Faculty of Letters and Human sciences in Tunis in 1992 for a thesis entitled: “Research, Dream and Defeat in the Novels of Abd al-Rahman Munif.” She also obtained a state doctorate in Arabic language and literature from the Faculty of Letters, Arts and Humanities in Manouba in 2004 with research entitled “Description in the Modern Arabic Novel.”

== Career ==
She began her work in secondary education in 1987 at the Russia Approach Institute in Tunisia, and continued there until 1992. Then she moved to work in higher education, working as a secondary education professor attached to higher education at the Faculty of Humanities and Social Sciences in Tunis, Department of Arabic Language between 1992 and 1993, then as an assistant at the faculty until 1996, then an assistant professor at the college until 2004, until she became a lecturer at the college since that year. She is also a member of the Master's Committee at the Faculty of Humanities and Social Sciences, Department of Arabic Language in Tunis, and a member of the Master's Committee at the Faculty of Letters, Arts and Humanities, Department of Arabic Language in Manouba.

== Publications ==
- “Dream and Defeat in the Novels of Abd al-Rahman Munif”, Publications of the College of Humanities and Social Sciences, 1995.
- "Heroes and the Epic of Collapse: A Study in the Novels of Abd al-Rahman Munif”, University Publishing Center, 1999
- "Description in the Modern Arabic Novel", College of Humanities and Social Sciences, 2007.
- "On the Theory of Narrative Description: A Study of Boundaries and Morphological and Semantic Structures”, 2008.
- "Women in Foreign Places," University Publishing Center, Tunis, 2009.
