= Samar Samir Mezghanni =

Tunisian children's author (born 1988)

Samar Samir Mezghanni سمر سمير المزغني
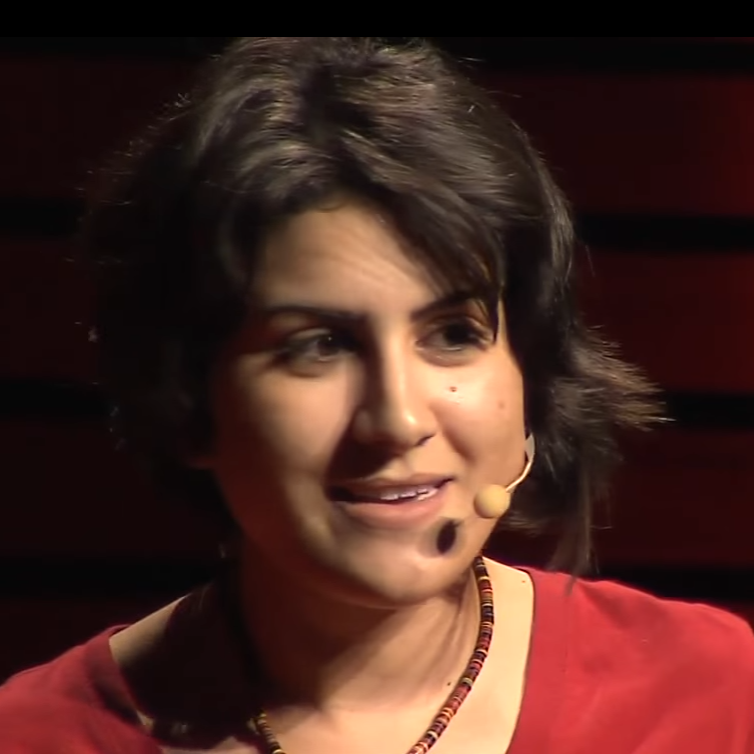
- Mezghanni at her TED talk in Tunis
- Born: 27 August 1988 (age 38); Tunisia
- Education: Tunis El Manar University; University of Birmingham
- Occupation: Writer
- Writing career
- Language: Arabic
- Period: 1995–present
- Genres: Children's literature, novel
- Notable awards: The Youngest Writer in the World & Youngest Most Prolific Writer in the World by Guinness Book of World Records
- Website: www.samarsamirmezghanni.com

Samar Samir Mezghanni (Arabic: سمر سمير المزغني; born 27 August 1988) is a Tunisian children's author.

== Early life ==
Mezghanni was born in 1988 to the Tunisian lawyer Samir Mezghanni and an Iraqi mother named Sahar. She has two brothers, Samer and Sirar, and one sister, Siwar.

== Education ==
Mezghanni earned a BA in psychology from Tunis El Manar University and a Master's from the University of Birmingham and is currently undertaking a doctorate in Middle Eastern Studies at the University of Cambridge.

== Career ==
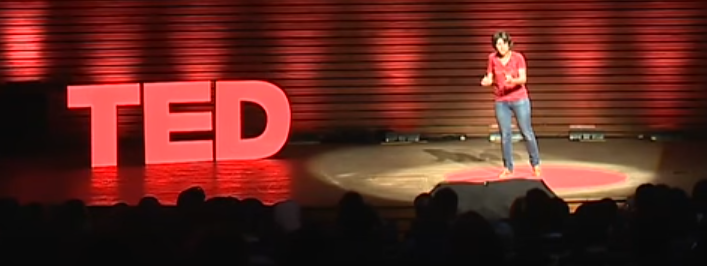
Mezghanni presenting "Faces of the revolution" at TEDTalentSearch in Tunis in 2012

Mezghanni has written over a hundred children stories and is a member of numerous Arabic and international organizations. Her first child story was published in September 1997. She holds the Guinness records for youngest published writer and the most prolific. Mezghanni has appeared on British media speaking out against extremism in the Middle East.

== Awards & honors ==
- One of the BBC's 100 Women 2013
- One of the 100 most powerful Arab women 2013 Link
- 'The Youngest Writer in the World' in 2000 by the Guinness Book of World Records
- 'Youngest Most Prolific Writer in the World' in 2002 by the Guinness Book of World Records
- Appeared in the Arabian Business list of 30 Under 30 in 2009
- 2000 Child Book Award given by then-Tunisian President Zine El Abidine Ben Ali during the National Day of Culture
- Creativity Collar by the Iraqi Story House in 2002
- Honorary Member of the Tunisian Writers Union

== Selected publications ==
=== Children's literature ===
- Mohakamatou Dhi'ib (Trial of a Wolf)
- Holm Fi Hadeekat Al-Hayawanet (A Dream in the Zoo)
