= Essma Ben Hamida =

Tunisian schoolteacher, journalist and entrepreneur

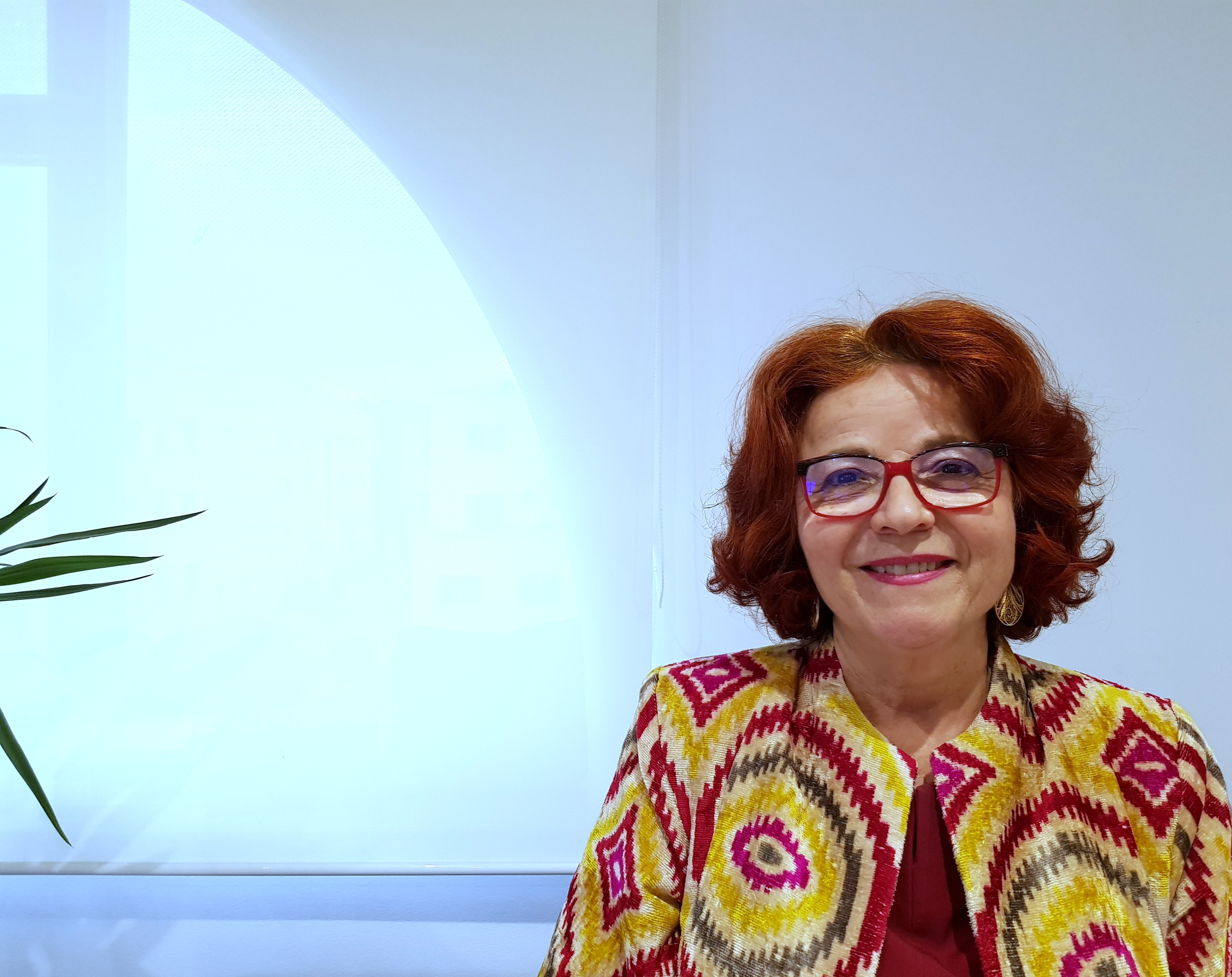
- Born: 1951 (age 74–75); Kairouan, Tunisia
- Education: University of Tunis
- Occupations: Journalist, writer

Essma Ben Hamida (born 1951) is a Tunisian schoolteacher, journalist and entrepreneur. After opening and operating a branch of the Tunisian news agency TAP at the UN Headquarters in New York, she returned to Tunisia and together with her British husband, Michael Cracknell, founded Enda inter-arabe in 1990 on the basis of Enda Third World. As Enda Tamweel, it has since become a highly successful microfinance institution for women, admitting men providing their wives act as guarantors. In 2010, Ben Hamida was honoured as "Outstanding Social Entrepreneur in the Middle East and North Africa" by the Schwab Foundation and the World Economic Forum.

== Biography ==
Born in 1951 in Kairouan, Essma Ben Hamida studied history and geography at the University of Tunis. After graduating, she spent a year as a post-graduate at Paris-Est Créteil University where she studied urbanism but then taught in high school for a number of years before becoming a journalist. In 1970, she moved to New York where she created the first Tunisian press agency office at the United Nations headquarters. Continuing her involvement with the UN, in the 1980s she spent almost nine years in Rome and Geneva working for the International Foundation for Development Alternatives and the Inter-Press Service. She reported on the activities of agencies including the FAO, IFAD, World Food Programme and World Food Council. This entailed trips to Latin America, Africa and the Middle East where she interviewed people living in deprived communities, reporting back to the UN agencies.

After spending 12 years abroad, she returned to Tunisia and, together with her husband Michael Cracknell, founded Enda inter-arabe in 1994 in order to provide easier access to capital through microfinance for disadvantaged women who wished to progress in business. In particular, she encouraged women to become economically independent as she was convinced they had a vital role to play in development. Three-quarters of those who sought financing were women although men were also permitted to participate provided their wives acted as guarantors. This led to fruitful collaboration between men and women and wider acceptance of the ability of women to run businesses. Enda offered additional services for women including discussion fora, literacy courses, marketing and financial management. By 2019, some 800,000 micro-entrepreneurs had benefited from Enda's services, most of them women living in disadvantaged areas.

== Awards ==
Ben Hamida received the distinction of "Outstanding Social Entrepreneur in the Middle East and North Africa of the year 2010" from the Schwab Foundation and the World Economic Forum. In 2019, Takreem honoured her as "Outstanding Arab Woman".

In 2020, she received the "Arab woman's award for excellence" from the Takreem Foundation.
