= Najiya Thamir =

Tunisian writer and producer of radio programs

Najiya Thamir, also known as Nejia Thameur and Bint al -Waha, (1926–1988) was a Tunisian writer and radio phonic programs producer.

== Biography ==
Thamir was born on March 15, 1926, in Damascus to a family of Turkish origin. She received her primary education in Ba'labakk, Lebanon, and her secondary and university education in Damascus. Thamir settled in Tunis after her marriage and worked in for the Tunisian radio as a producer of literary and social programs. She also wrote essays, short stories, radio plays, and novels. She became a vibrant icon in the intellectual circles of the Arabic world especially for publishing several journalistic writings related to the women's rights in the Arab world in the hope of raising the awareness about their rights in several Tunisian and Arabic newspapers.

== Bibliography ==
- Berrada, Mohammed (2008), "Arab North Africa", in Ashour, Radwa; Ghazoul, Ferial J.; Reda-Mekdashi, Hasna (eds.), Arab Women Writers: A Critical Reference Guide, 1873-1999, American University in Cairo, ISBN 9774161467.
