= Michelle Perrot =

French historian (born 1928)

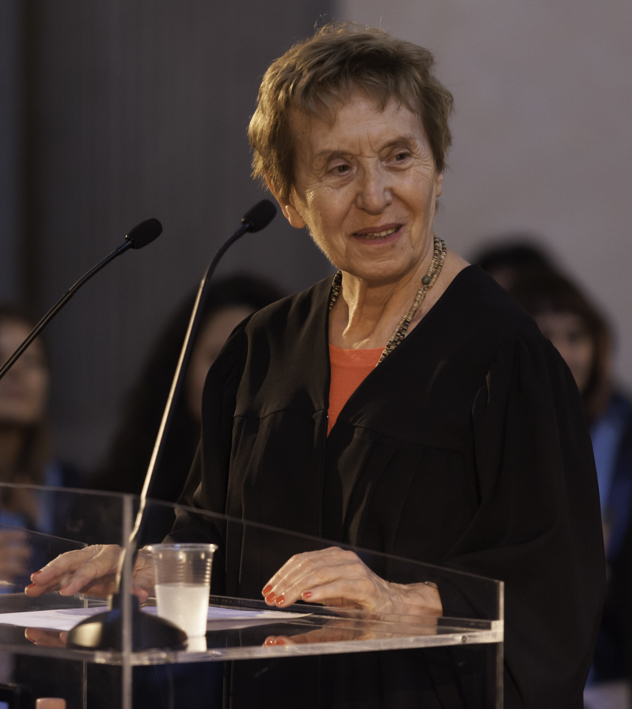
- Perrot in 2016
- Born: 18 May 1928 (age 98); Paris, France
- Occupations: French historian; Professor emeritus of Contemporary History at the Paris Diderot University
- Notable work: Simone de Beauvoir Prize recipient

Michelle Perrot (French: [miʃɛl pɛʁo]; born 18 May 1928) is a French historian and academic who is Professor emeritus of Contemporary History at the Paris Diderot University. She won the 2009 Prix Femina Essai.

== Life and career ==
Perrot has worked on the history of labour movements, and studied with Ernest Labrousse, with Michel Foucault, and with Robert Badinter.

She is a pioneer in the emergence of women's history and gender studies in France. She edited with Georges Duby, Histoire des femmes en Occident ("History of women in the West"; 5 vols.), Plon, 1990–1991).

Her work appears in Libération, and she produced and presented "History Mondays" (les lundis de l'histoire) on France Culture radio.

In 2014, she received the Simone de Beauvoir Prize.

For her, feminism is a universal freedom. She is co-author of the book "A History of Women in the West".

In 2026 Perrot contributed her expertise on women's history as a member of the commission to develop a list of 72 women in STEM proposed to be added to the 72 men named on the Eiffel Tower.

== Works ==
- Délinquance et système pénitentiaire en France au XIXe siècle, Annales: Économies, Sociétés, Civilisations, 1975.
- Georges Duby & Michelle Perrot (eds.), Histoire des femmes en Occident, Paris: Plon, 1990–1991 (5 vols.)
- Images de femmes, (co-written with) Georges Duby, Paris: Plon, 1992, 189 p.
- Les femmes ou les silences de l'histoire, Paris: Flammarion, 1998.
- Les Ombres de l’Histoire. Crime et châtiment au XIXe siècle, Paris: Flammarion, 2001.
- Mon histoire des femmes, Paris: Éditions du Seuil, 2006, 251 p. (ISBN 978-2-7578-0797-2).
- Histoire de chambres, Paris: Le Seuil, 2009 – Prix Femina Essai 2009.
- George Sand à Nohant : Une maison d'artiste, 2018

=== In translation ===
- The Bedroom: An Intimate History, translated by Lauren Elkin, Yale University Press, 2018, ISBN 978-0300167092
