= Simone de Beauvoir Prize =

The Simone de Beauvoir Prize (French: Prix Simone de Beauvoir pour la liberté des femmes) is an international human rights prize for women's freedom, awarded since 2008 to individuals or groups fighting for gender equality and opposing breaches of human rights. It is named after the French author and philosopher Simone de Beauvoir, known for her 1949 women's rights treatise The Second Sex.

The prize was founded by Julia Kristeva on 9 January 2008, the 100th anniversary of de Beauvoir's birth. Sylvie Le Bon de Beauvoir and Pierre Bras are the head of the Simone de Beauvoir prize committee.

According to the organizers:

The prize is awarded every year to a remarkable personality whose courage and thoughts are examples for everybody, in the spirit of Simone de Beauvoir who wrote: "The ultimate end, for which human beings should aim, is liberty, the only capable [thing], to establish every end on."

== Recipients ==
- 2008 – Taslima Nasreen, Bangladeshi writer, and Ayaan Hirsi Ali, Dutch feminist, writer and politician.
- 2009 – One Million Signatures, a campaign by the Women's rights movement in Iran, demanding changes to discriminatory laws in Iran.
- 2010 – Ai Xiaoming, Chinese videographer and professor at Sun Yat-sen University, and Jianmei Guo, Chinese lawyer and founder of the Women's Law Studies and Legal Aid Center at the Peking University School of Law.
- 2011 – Lyudmila Ulitskaya, Russian novelist and civil rights activist
- 2012 – Association tunisienne des femmes démocrates (Tunisian Association of Democratic Women)
- 2013 – Malala Yousafzai, Pakistani student, blogger and activist.
- 2014 – Michelle Perrot, French historian
- 2015 – National Museum of Women in the Arts
- 2016 – Giusi Nicolini, Mayor of Lampedusa for her involvement with the integration of immigrants on the island.
- 2017 – Polish association 'Save Women'. Barbara Nowacka accepted the prize.
- 2018 – Aslı Erdoğan, Turkish writer
- 2019 – Sara García Gross, Salvadoran activist
- 2020 – Collectif 490 des Hors-la-loi du Maroc, Morocco, Organisation for sexual self-determination
- 2021 – Scholastique Mukasonga Rwanda, author
- 2022 – La Maison des femmes de Saint-Denis, France, Women's shelter in Saint-Denis represented by Ghada Hatem-Gantzer
- 2023 – Iranian women fighting for freedom, Iran, In memory of Mahsa Amini
- 2024 – Marie-Paule Djegue Okri, Ivory Coast, Agronomist and women's rights activist
