= Alia Tabaï =

Tunisian novelist

- علياء التابعي
- Occupation: Novelist

Alia Tabaï (Arabic: علياء التابعي, romanized: ‘Alyā’ al-Tābi‘ī) (b. 1961) is a Tunisian novelist. Her novel, Cactus Flowers, is notable for its use of Tunisian Arabic in its dialogues and has been translated into French.

Cactus Flowers follows the story of three friends, Rajaa, Ahmad and Adel, after they graduate from university and find their ideals challenged by life. All three are students at the University of Tunis in the 1970s, but from different backgrounds: Rajaa comes from an old neighborhood in the capital, Ahmad is from a wealthy family of Turkish origins, and Adel is from a poor family. The novel focuses on the meeting of Rajaa and Ahmad one night, after nine years of separation during which Ahmad emigrated to France and Rajaa had a complicated marriage. The novel explores themes of politics and power as well as the status of women in Tunisian society.

Though the novel is written in Standard Arabic, the dialogue is in Tunisian Arabic. To facilitate understanding for non-Tunisian Arab readers, the author provides extensive footnotes translating the Tunisian dialogue into Standard Arabic.
