= Fethia Hechmi =

Tunisian novelist

- فتحية الهاشمي
- Born: 1955 (age 70–71)
- Occupation: Writer • Novelist • Poet
- Writing career
- Language: Arabic
- Notable awards: 2009 Credif Prize for Best Writing by a Tunisian Woman

Fethia Hechmi (Arabic: فتحية الهاشمي, romanized: Fatḥiyya al-Hāshimī) (b. 1955) is a Tunisian novelist. She published her first collection of poems entitled al-Uqḥuwān al-maṣlūb alā al-shifah in 2002, and her first novel Ḥāfiyat al-rūḥ (novel) in 2002. Her 2009 novel Maryam tasquṭ min yadd Allāh has been recognized for its experimental style. She was active in the 2011 Tunisian revolution and has been a prominent voice on Tunisian politics since then.

== Works ==
=== Novels ===
- (2005) Ḥāfiyat al-rūḥ (حافية الروح (Bare-footed soul))
- (2007) Minnah Mawwāl (منّة موّال)
- (2009) Maryam tasquṭ min yadd Allāh (مريم تسقط من يد الله (Maryam falls from the hand of God))
- (2016) al-ʿAnkabūt lā yaḥrus al-ʾanbiyāʾ dāʾiman (العنكبوت لا يحرس الأنبياء دائما (The spider does not always guard prophets))

=== Poetry ===
- (2002) al-Uqḥuwān al-maṣlūb alā al-shifah (الأقحوان المصلوب على الشفاه (A daisy crucified on lips))

=== Short story collections ===
- (2012) al-Shayṭān yaʿūd min al-manfā (الشيطان يعود من المنفى (Satan returns from exile))

== Prizes ==
- (2009) Credif Prize for Best Writing by a Tunisian Woman (جائزة الكريديف لأحسن الكتابات النسائية بتونس)
