= Rachida el-Charni =

Tunisian writer

Rachida el-Charni (born 1967) is a Tunisian writer. She has published three collections of short stories and one novel. Her short story 'Street of the House of Wonders' (also known as 'The way to Poppy Street') was in Habila Helon's The Granta Book of the African Short Story - a collection of short stories from prominent African writers, including Chimamanda Adichie, Mansoura Ez-Eldin, Doreen Baingana, Henrietta Rose-Innes, E. C. Osondu, Alex La Guma and Camara Laye among others.

== Prizes ==
- First prize, Arab Women’s Creative Writing (Sharjah), 2000, for her second collection of short stories
- Centre of Arab Woman for Training and Research (Tunisia), 1997, for her first collection of short stories

== Selected works ==
=== Novels ===
- Tarateel li-Alamiha (Hymns for her Pain), 2011

=== Short story collections ===
- Saheel al-Asaila (The Neighing of Questions), 2002
