= Sophie el Goulli =

Tunisian writer and art historian

- Born: 4 February 1932; Sousse, Tunisia
- Died: 10 October 2015 (aged 83)
- Citizenship: Tunisia
- Education: Sorbonne
- Occupations: Writer, art historian
- Writing career
- Subject: Film

Sophie el Goulli (4 February 1932 – 10 October 2015) was a Tunisian writer and art historian.

She was born in Sousse and was educated at the Sorbonne. El Goulli worked for the Tunisian Ministry of Culture and taught art history at the University of Tunis. She also has contributed to the cinematic arts journal SeptièmArt. She retired in 1993, and moved to Tunis. She died on 10 October 2015.

El Gouilli established the Tunisian film library. She received the Prix Culturel du Cinéma in 1991 and the Prix national de la Critique in 1992.

== Selected works ==
- Signes, poetry (1973)
- Ammar Farhat, monograph (1979)
- Nos rêves, poetry for children (1980)
- Vertige solaire, poetry (1981)
- Les mystères de Tunis, novel (1993)
- Peinture en Tunisie, art history (1994)
