= Aïcha Chaibi =

Tunisian novelist

- Occupation: Writer • Novelist
- Writing career
- Language: French

Aïcha Chaibi was a Tunisian novelist. Not much is known about Chaibi's life. In 1975 she published Rached which promoted Tunisian cultural identity while criticizing European values.

== Works ==
- (1975) Rached (also sometimes titled as Rachid), published by Maison Tunisienne de l'Édition
