= Tunisian Association of Democratic Women =

Tunisian association

Tunisian association of Female Democrats (Association tunisienne des femmes démocrates)
- Founded: August 6
- Type: human rights organization
- Location: Tunis
- Origins: Debating circle within the Tahar- Haddad cultural Club
- Region served: Tunisia
- Key people: Yosra Frawes and Neila Zoghlami

The Tunisian Association of Democratic Women (French: L'Association tunisienne des femmes démocrates (ATFD), Arabic: الجمعية التونسية للنساء الديمقراطيات) is a Tunisian feminist association which was founded in 1989.

== History ==
In the 1970s and 1980s, a group of Tunisian intellectuals formed a debating circle around feminist topics in the Tahar-Haddad cultural club with the support of Jalila Hafsia.

The Tunisian Association of Democratic Women was officially founded on the 6th of August 1989. It is an independent organization that criticises Muslim influences on society, a lack of democracy and violations of women's rights. It judges the development on women's rights in Tunisia according to international standards like the Convention on the Elimination of All Forms of Discrimination Against Women. Tunisia did advance earlier in granting women more rights. For example through the Code of Personal Status in Tunisia which was established after the declaration of independence in 1956 which was a breakthrough in women's rights.

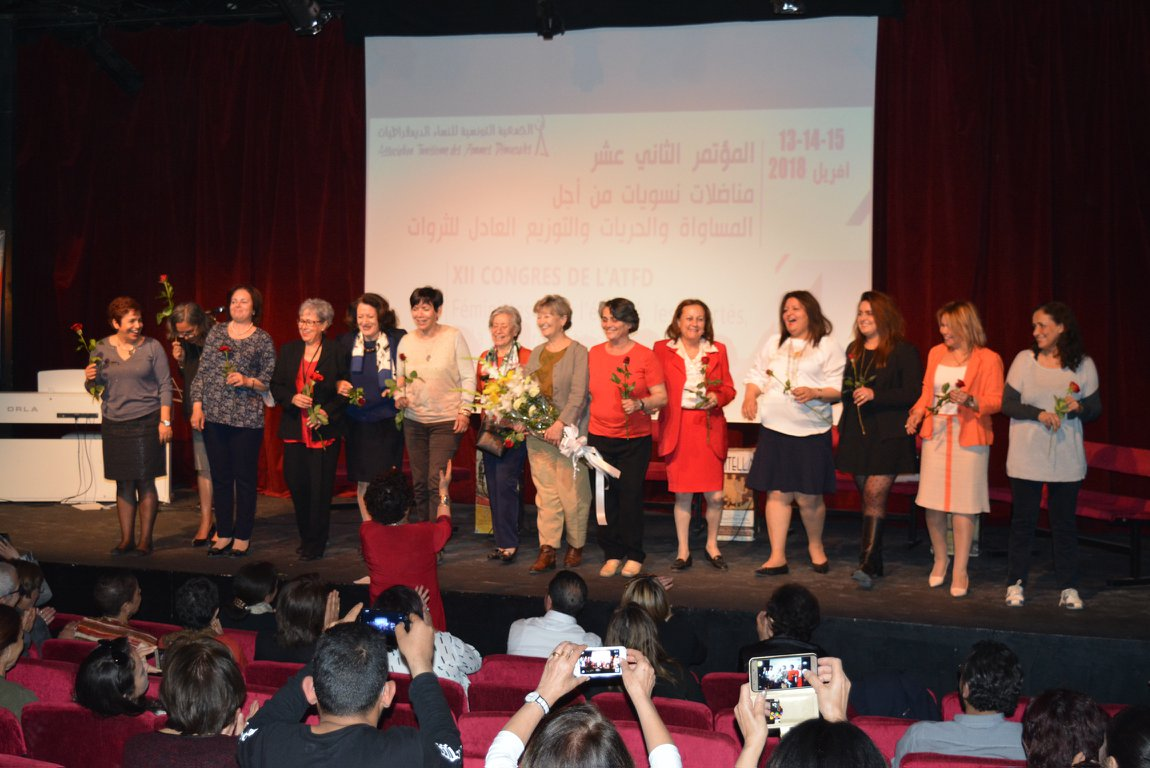
12th congress of l'AFTD, 13th of April 2018 in Tunis

In 1993, the association opened up a counseling center for female victims of violence. In 2004, the association was one of initiators behind the initiative of the sexual harassment law in Tunisia. The organization also played an important rule in the Tunisian revolution in 2011. They fought to have election lists that keep gender quotas in mind for the Constituent Assembly of Tunisia. They always lobbied to have gender equality be put into all new laws.

In 2008, the association won the Prize for human rights of the Republic of France (Prix des droits de l'Homme de la République française). In 2012, it was awarded with the Simone de Beauvoir Prize (Prix Simone de Beauvoir pout la libterté des femmes).

In summer 2021, the current president of the association, Neila Zoghlami, was present alongside other civil society leaders at Tunisian President Kais Saied's broadcast announcement of new "emergency" political measures including the dissolution of parliament, and she has since led the organization in making public statements and calling for political action to return Tunisia to more a constitutionally-based, consultative government.

== Presidents of the Association ==
One of the presidents of the association was the sociologist Khadija Chérif, who was formerly the secretary general of the International Federation for Human Rights in which l'ATFD is also a member. Another president was Ahlem Belhadj, who is the head of child psychiatry at the hospital of Tunis. Furthermore the lawyer Bochra Belhaj Hmida was a president and also the law professor Sana Ben Achour. Safia Farhat, who is a pioneer in visual arts in Tunisia was also heading the organization. The medical professor Habiba Zéhi Ben Romdhane was president of the association. Others included the pediatrician Saïda Rached, the law professor Monia Ben Jemia and the lawyer Yosra Frawes. The current president is Neila Zoghlami since June 2021.

== See also ==
- Member organizations of the Tunisian National Dialogue Quartet
