= Tunisian literature =

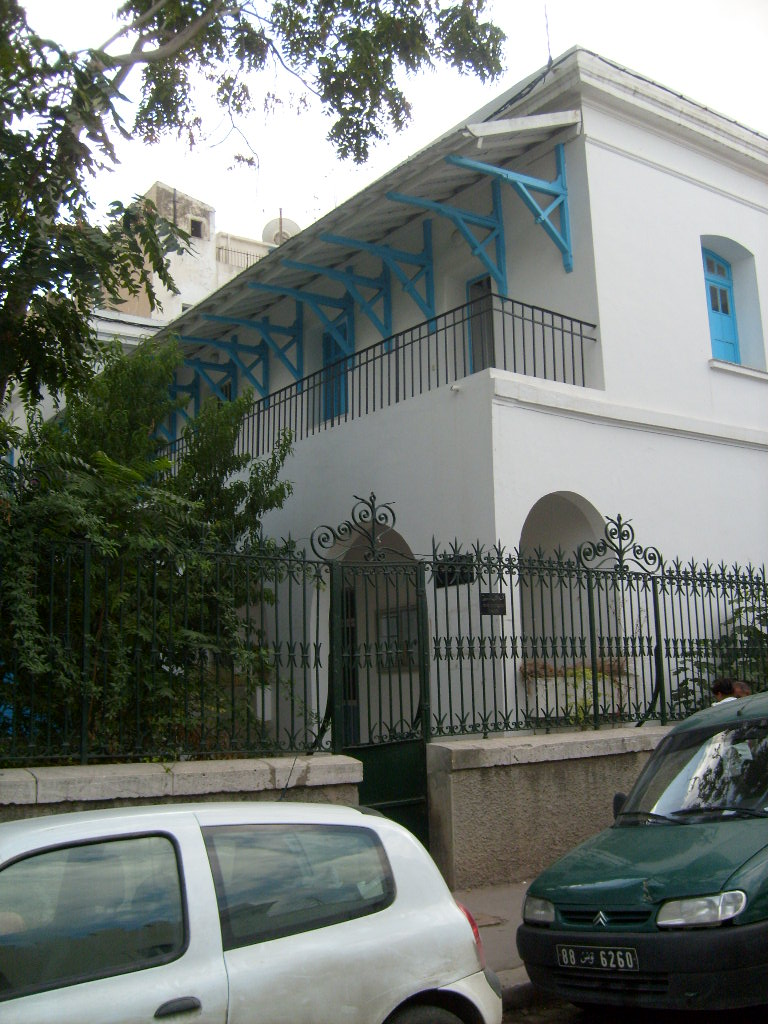
Headquarters of the Union des écrivains tunisiens (Tunisian Writers Union) in Tunis

Tunisian literature refers to all oral and written literary works produced by the people of Tunisia, primarily in Arabic and in French. It also includes the works of writers from the Tunisian diaspora (c. 1 million people in 2023) and of those authors who recognize themselves as belonging to the tunisian culture.

Arabic literature in Tunisia dates to the 7th century, with the arrival of Arab civilization in the region. Arabic literature is more important than francophone literature — which followed the introduction of the French protectorate in 1881 — both in volume and value. The national bibliography lists 1,249 non-academic books published in 2002 in Tunisia, of which 885 titles are in Arabic. Nearly a third of these books are intended for children.

In 2003, the state budget dedicated 3 million Tunisian dinars to the support of literature. There are approximately 100 private Tunisian publishing houses that publish virtually all books.

== Arabic literature ==
=== Early arabic literature ===
The spread of Islam in the Maghreb region from 630 AD onwards quickly reached the Exarchate of Carthage (591-698). The religious expansion was accompanied by the linguistic, cultural and ethnic arabization of the indigenous populations. The linguistic conversion from Berber to Arabic accelerated with the arrival of the Hilalians, a confederation of Arab tribes from the Hejaz and Najd regions who migrated to North Africa (called Ifriqiya at that time) between the late 10th and 13th centuries.

At the height of its splendor, between the 9th and 11th centuries, Kairouan was one of the greatest centers of Muslim civilization, thanks mainly to the influence of the Great Mosque of Kairouan.

It is difficult to distinguish the intellectual, literary, or spiritual output of any particular part of the Arab world, which is better understood as a continuum. However, in everyday cultural life, Arabized Berbers throughout the Maghreb mainly use Maghrebi Arabic (except in theology where classic Arabic remained predominant).

In fact, several Arabic-speaking writers are known to have originated from the Ifriqiya province (698–1574), which became Ottoman (1574–1881):

- Ibn 'Arafa (1316–1401), theologian and eminent representative of the Maliki school;
- Ibn Khaldun (1332–1406), historian and father of Arabic historiography and sociology;
- Muhammad ibn Muhammad al-Nefzawi (c. 1400–1450), author of The Perfumed Garden, the Arabic pendant to the Indian Kama Sutra
- Ibn Abi Dinar (1630–1690), historian and magistrate;
- Al-Wazir Al-Sarraj (1659–1735), historian of Andalusian origins, who lived and operated around the University of Ez-Zitouna in Tunisia;
- Hussein Khouja (1666–1732), historian and statesman in early 18th century;
- Mohamed Seghir Ben Youssef (1691–1771), historian
- Hammouda Ben Abdelaziz (1733–1787), chronist and historian

=== Arabic literature between the 18th and 19th centuries ===
This period was characterized by a transition from traditional forms, primarily centered on religious scholarship, history and court poetry, toward a nascent reformist movement. This period, preceding the full impact of European colonization, saw intellectuals acting as theologians, historians, and reformers who engaged with the political and social issues of the time.

To the most known writers of this era belong:

- Sidi Brahim Riahi (1766–1850), poet, ambassador and theologian;
- Ahmad ibn Abi Diyaf (1804–1874), author of a multi-volume history of Tunisia;
- Mahmud Qabadu (1812–1871), Quranic scholar and progressist member of the ulama at the University of Ez-Zitouna;
- Salem Bouhageb (v. 1824–1924), poet and reformist
- Muhammad al-Sanusi (1851–1900), university professor and writer
- Mohamed Nakhli (1869–1924), writer and reformist

=== Comtemporary Arabic literature ===
Arabic contemporary literary figures include Ali Douagi, who has written more than 150 radio plays, more than 500 poems and songs, and nearly 15 plays., Abdelaziz El Aroui (1898–1971), Tahar Haddad (1899–1935), Mohamed Hedi Al Amri (1906–1978), Mahmoud Messadi (1911–2004) who also served as Minister of Education and Minister of Culture, Salih al-Souissi al-Qayrawani (1871–1941), a poet and novelest in the Nahda movement, and Bashir Khrayyef gave new life to the Arabic novel in the 1930s and caused a scandal by including dialog in Tunisian dialect in his first short story. Other literary figures include Moncef Ghachem, Nafila Dhahab, Hassan Ben Othmen, Habib Selmi, Walid Soliman and Mahmoud Messadi. Messaadi was known for points of intersection of Islamic themes and nationalism within his work.

Tunisian poetry is non-conformist and innovative: the language of Aboul-Qacem Echebbi opposes the lack of imagination in Arabic literature.

== French-language literature ==
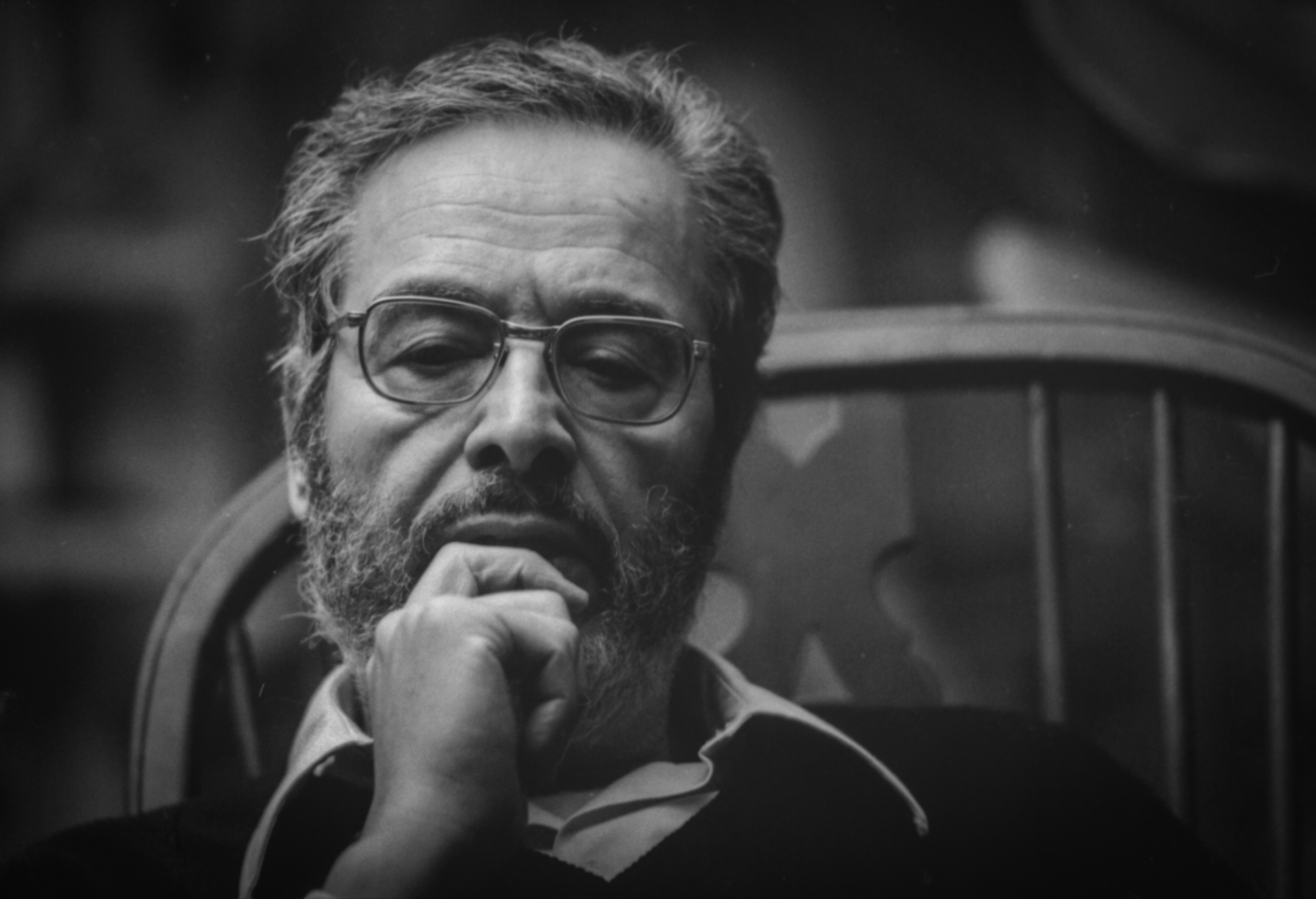
Albert Memmi (1982)

Francophone literature in Tunisia began, strictly speaking, in the 20th century. It was initially powered as much by Arab Muslim authors like Mahmoud Aslan and Salah Farhat as by minority authors of Jewish (e.g. Ryvel and César Benattar), Italian, or even Maltese (e.g. Marius Scalési) descent. Francophone literature has blossomed thanks to French people living in Tunisia who founded a Tunisian literary life modeled on that of Paris.

Today, Tunisian francophone literature is characterized by its critical approach. Contrary to the pessimism of Albert Memmi, who predicted that Tunisian literature was condemned to a young death, Tunisian writers like Abdelwahab Meddeb, Tahar Bekri, Mustapha Tlili, Hélé Béji, Aymen Hacen and Fawzi Mellah have broken through abroad. The themes of wandering, exile, disconnection, memory and representation are prominent in their writing .

== Jewish-Tunisian literature ==
Jewish communities have long been established in Tunisia. Their liturgical language is Hebrew and their everyday spoken language is a variety of Arabic called Judeo-Tunisian.

The most known ancient author in Judeo-Tunisian is the rabbi Nissim ben Jacob (960–1062), who, together with Chananel ben Chushiel, ran the renowned Yeshiva of Kairouan, within a jewish community that disappeared around 1270.

The establishment of Ottoman rule in Tunisia (the Regency of Tunis) following the Battle of Djerba (1560) allowed the Jewish community of Djerba to prosper under dhimmi status, with figures such as Shimon ibn Lavi (1486–1585). A religious revival emerged in the 18th century in Djerba, Tripoli, and Tunis with Masa'ud Raphael Alfasi and Aharon Perez.

The first Judeo-Tunisian printing press opened in 1860 in Tunis, while the Alliance Israélite Universelle established its schools in the country. Around 1920, Tunisia had approximately 50,000 speakers of Judeo-Tunisian.

Judeo-Tunisian literature, both oral and written, existed mainly under the French protectorate (1881–1956) and covered genres such as journalism, prose, prose essays, poetry, theater, song, and correspondence. The exodus of Jews from Arab and Muslim countries after 1947 put an end to this dynamism.

Among the French cultural figures of Tunisian origin are Nine Moati (1937–2021) and her brother Serge Moati (1946-).

== See also ==
- Arabic literature
- Francophone literature
- List of Tunisian writers
- List of Tunisian women writers
