= Amira Charfeddine =

- أميرة شرف الدين
- Writing career
- Notable work: Wild Fadhīla (ولد فضيلة)
- Notable awards: Ali Douagi Prize for Tunisian Arabic Literature

Amira Charfeddine (Arabic: أميرة شرف الدين, romanized: ʾAmīrah Sharf al-Dīn) is a Tunisian novelist. Her first novel, Wild Fadhīla (Fadhila's son), was written in Tunisian Arabic and is the first major Tunisian novel to feature a gay protagonist. The novel was commercially successful, selling 2,000 copies within a month of its release in April 2019. It was awarded the Ali Douagi prize from the Derja Association for best work written in Tunisian Arabic in 2019.

== Career ==
Charfeddine published her first novel, Wild Fadhīla, in 2019. It tells the story of a boy, Fadhil, who is so close to his mother that everyone refers to him as wild Fadhila: "Fadhila's boy." As he reaches adolescence, he finds himself unable to be attracted to his girlfriend who—after catching him about to kiss his male best friend in the library—outs him to his mother. His family refuse to let him back into the house and Fadhil is forced to live on the streets, where he discovers a seedy and dangerous underside of Tunis few have seen.

Charfeddine has expressed that her motivation in writing the book was to show the pain and suffering that homosexuals in Tunisia endure, and to make the readers empathize with their experience. At the suggestion that the content of the book may be "shocking" to many Tunisian readers, Charfeddine said that, "Some people need to be shocked, so that they can feel."

Charfeddine has refused to comment on whether the novel is based on a true story.

Wild Fadhīla is the first Tunisian novel written in Arabic with a gay protagonist. However, there have been Tunisian novelists who have written in French on the subject, including Eyet-Chékib Djaziri in his novels Un poisson sur la balançoire (1997) and Une promesse de douleur et de sangg (1998). Djaziri is one of several Francophone North African writers who live in France and write about homosexuality. Also, the Tunisian novelist Messaouda Boubaker's 1999 novel Ṭrushqāna features a transgender main character.

The novel was written in Tunisian Arabic, rather than Standard Arabic. This makes the novel part of a "wave" of recent novels written in the vernacular rather than the literary language. One literary critic, though not finding the language of the novel elegant, described the choice as "appropriate for the novel... its characters, and its events;" another critic excoriated the "vulgar" language of the novel. Charfeddine explained her choice by saying that she wrote it because she had a story to tell; the language wasn't the focus. She also said that she writes on Facebook every day in "derja" (Tunisian Arabic) and speaks in derja, so any future books she writes will likely be in derja. Charfeddine is the second woman to publish a Tunisian vernacular novel, after Faten Fazaa.

== Works ==
- (2019) Wild Fadhīla (ولد فضيلة (Fadhila's son)), Tunis: Nous éditions
