= Tunisian Arabic =

Arabic dialect spoken in Tunisia

- تونسي Tūnsi / دارجة Dērja
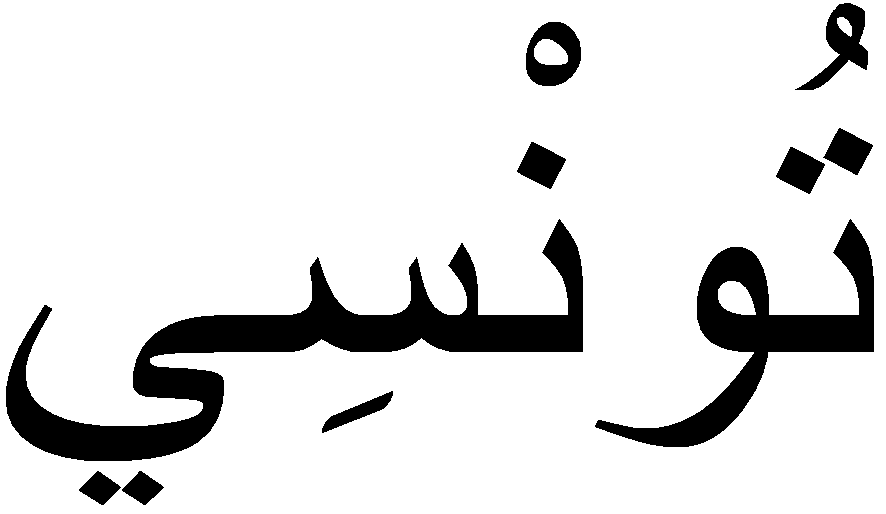
- Pronunciation: [ˈtuːnsi]
- Native to: Tunisia
- Ethnicity: Tunisians
- Speakers: 12.5 million (2024)
- Language family: Afro-Asiatic: Semitic; West Semitic; Central Semitic; Arabic; Maghrebi; Pre-Hilalian Arabic dialects; Tunisian Arabic
- Writing system: Arabic script
- Signed forms: Tunisian Sign Language

Official status
- Recognised minority language in: As a variety of Maghrebi Arabic on 7 May 1999 (Not ratified due to several Constitutional Matters):

Language codes
- ISO 639-3: aeb
- Glottolog: tuni1259
- Geographic distribution of Tunisian Arabic (navy blue)

Tunisian Arabic, or simply Tunisian (Arabic: تونسي, romanized: Tūnsi), is a variety of Arabic spoken in Tunisia. It is known among its 12.5 million speakers as Tūnsi [ˈtuːnsi] "Tunisian" or Derja (Arabic: الدارجة; meaning "common or everyday dialect") to distinguish it from Modern Standard Arabic, the official language of Tunisia. Tunisian Arabic is mostly similar to eastern Algerian Arabic and western Libyan Arabic.

As part of the Maghrebi Arabic dialect continuum, Tunisian merges into Algerian Arabic and Libyan Arabic at the borders of the country. Like other Maghrebi dialects, it has a vocabulary that is predominantly Semitic and Arabic with a Berber, Latin and Neo-Punic substratum. Tunisian Arabic contains Berber loanwords which represent 8% to 9% of its vocabulary. However, Tunisian has also loanwords from French, Turkish, Italian and the languages of Spain and a little bit of Persian.

Multilingualism within Tunisia and in the Tunisian diaspora makes it common for Tunisians to code-switch, mixing Tunisian with French, English, Italian, Standard Arabic or other languages in daily speech. Within some circles, Tunisian Arabic has thereby integrated new French and English words, notably in technical fields, or has replaced old French and Italian loans with standard Arabic words. Moreover, code-switching between Tunisian Arabic and modern standard Arabic is mainly done by more educated and upper-class people and has not negatively affected the use of more recent French and English loanwords in Tunisian.

Tunisian Arabic is also closely related to Maltese, which is a separate language that descended from Tunisian and Siculo-Arabic. Maltese and Tunisian Arabic have about 30 to 40 per cent spoken mutual intelligibility.

== Classification ==
Tunisian Arabic is one of the Arabic languages within the Semitic branch of the Afroasiatic language family. It is a variety of Maghrebi Arabic like Moroccan and Algerian Arabic, which are mostly unintelligible to Modern Standard or Mashriqi Arabic speakers. It has a considerable number of pre-hilalian dialects but is usually considered in its koiné form to be a mostly Hilalian variety of Maghrebi Arabic because it was affected by the immigration of Banu Hilal in the 11th century, as were the other Maghrebi varieties.

As a part of the Arabic dialect continuum, it is reported that Tunisian Arabic is partly mutually intelligible with Algerian Arabic, Libyan Arabic, Moroccan Arabic, and Maltese. However, it is only slightly intelligible, if at all, with Egyptian, Levantine, Mesopotamian, or Gulf Arabic.

== History ==
A Tunisian person from the town of Téboursouk speaking Tunisian Arabic

=== Beginnings of the dialect ===
==== Linguistic situation of Ancient Tunisia ====
During classical antiquity, Tunisia's population spoke Berber languages related to the Numidian language. However, the languages progressively lost their function as main languages of Tunisia since the 12th century BC, and their usage became restricted mainly to the western regions of the country until their disappearance or evolution into other languages.

Indeed, migrants from Phoenicia settled Tunisia during the 12th to the 2nd century BC, founded ancient Carthage and progressively mixed with the local population. The migrants brought with them their culture and language that progressively spread from Tunisia's coastal areas to the rest of the coastal areas of Northwest Africa, the Iberian Peninsula and the Mediterranean islands. From the eighth century BC, most of Tunisia's inhabitants spoke the Punic language, a variant of the Phoenician language influenced by the local Numidian language. Also, already at that time, in the regions near to Punic settlements, the Berber that was used evolved considerably. In the urban centers such as Dougga, Bulla Regia, Thuburnica or Chemtou, Berber lost its Maghrebi phonology but kept the essential of its vocabulary. The word "Africa", which gave its name to the continent, possibly is derived from the name of the Berber tribe of the Afri that was one of the first to enter in contact with Carthage. Also during this period and up to the third century BC, the Tifinagh alphabet developed from the Phoenician alphabet.

After the arrival of Romans, following the fall of Carthage in 146 BC, the coastal population spoke mainly Punic, but that influence decreased away from the coast. From Roman period until the Arab conquest, Latin, Greek and Numidian further influenced the language, called Neo-Punic to differentiate it from its older version. This also progressively gave birth to African Romance, a Latin dialect, influenced by Tunisia's other languages and used along with them. Also, as it was the case for the other dialects, Punic probably survived the Arabic conquest of the Maghreb: the geographer al-Bakri described in the 11th century people speaking a language that was not Berber, Latin or Coptic in rural Ifriqiya, a region where spoken Punic survived well past its written use. However, it may be that the existence of Punic facilitated the spread of Arabic in the region, as Punic and Arabic are both Semitic languages and share many common roots.

==== Middle Ages ====
Classical Arabic began to be installed as a governmental and administrative language in Tunisia that was called then Ifriqiya from its older name Africa during the Muslim conquest of the Maghreb in 673. The people of several urban cities were progressively influenced by Arabic. By the 11th century, through contact of local languages such as African Romance or Berber with Classical Arabic, some urban dialects appeared in the main coastal cities of Tunisia. The dialects were slightly and characteristically influenced by several common Berber structures and vocabulary like negation because Tamazight was the language of contact for citizens of that period. The new dialects were also significantly influenced by other historical languages.

Many Tunisian and Maghrebi words, like qarnīṭ ("octopus"), have a Latin etymology. The dialects were later called Pre-Hilalian Arabic dialects and were used along Classical Arabic for communication in Tunisia. Also, Siculo-Arabic was spoken in several islands near Tunisia like Sicily, Pantelleria, and Malta and entered into contact with the Tunisian pre-hilalian dialects. Consequently, it ameliorated the divergence in grammar and structures of all the concerned dialects from Classical Arabic.

By the mid-11th century, the Banu Hilal immigrated to rural northern and central Tunisia and Banu Sulaym immigrated to southern Tunisia. The immigrants played a major role in spreading the use of Tunisian Arabic in an important part of the country. However, they brought some of the characteristics of their local Arabic dialects as well. In fact, central and western Tunisian Arabic speakers began using the voiced velar stop [ɡ] instead of the voiceless uvular stop [q] in words such as qāl "he said". Main linguists working about Hilalian dialects like Veronika Ritt-Benmimoum and Martine Vanhove supposed that even the replacement of the diphthongs /aw/ and /aj/ respectively by /uː/ and /iː/ vowels was a Hilalian influence. Furthermore, the phonologies brought to the new towns speaking Tunisian Arabic are those of the immigrants and not Tunisian phonology. The Sulaym even spread a new dialect in southern Tunisia, Libyan Arabic.

However, some dialects avoided the Hilalian influence: Judeo-Tunisian Arabic, a vernacular spoken by Tunisian Jews and known for the conservation of foreign phonemes in loanwords and slightly influenced by Hebrew phonology, Sfax dialect and Tunisian urban woman dialect.

By the 15th century, after the Reconquista and subsequent decline of the formerly Arabic-speaking al-Andalus, many Andalusians immigrated to the Tunisian main coastal cities. These migrants brought some of the characteristics of Andalusian Arabic to the sedentary urban dialects spoken in Tunisia. Among others, it led to the reuse of the voiceless uvular stop [q] instead of the nomadic Hilalian voiced velar stop [ɡ] and to speech simplification in Tunisian, which further differentiated the language from Classical Arabic. Furthermore, the changes were recognized by the Hafsid scholar ibn Khaldun in his Muqaddimah in 1377. He said that language contact between classical Arabic and local languages caused the creation of many Arabic varieties very distinct from formal Arabic.

=== Ottoman period ===
During the 17th to the 19th centuries, Tunisia came under Spanish, then Ottoman rule and hosted Morisco then Italian immigrants from 1609. That made Tunisian, Spanish, Italian, Mediterranean Lingua Franca, and Turkish languages connected. Tunisian acquired several new loanwords from Italian, Spanish, and Turkish and even some structures like the Ottoman Turkish: -jī suffix added to several nouns to mean professions like kawwāṛjī, qahwājī... During the mid-19th century, Tunisian Arabic was studied by several European scientists. In 1893, a first linguistic study was completed by the German linguist Hans Stumme. That began a still ongoing research trend on Tunisian Arabic.

=== Modern history ===
During the French protectorate of Tunisia, the country encountered the Standard French language. That affected Tunisian considerably, as new loanwords, meanings and structures were drawn from French. The unintelligibility of Tunisian to Middle Eastern Arabic speakers was worsened.

Geographic distribution of Tunisian Arabic as of 1960 (in blue). The fields in dark blue and light blue were respectively the geographic dispositions of Algerian and Libyan Arabic.

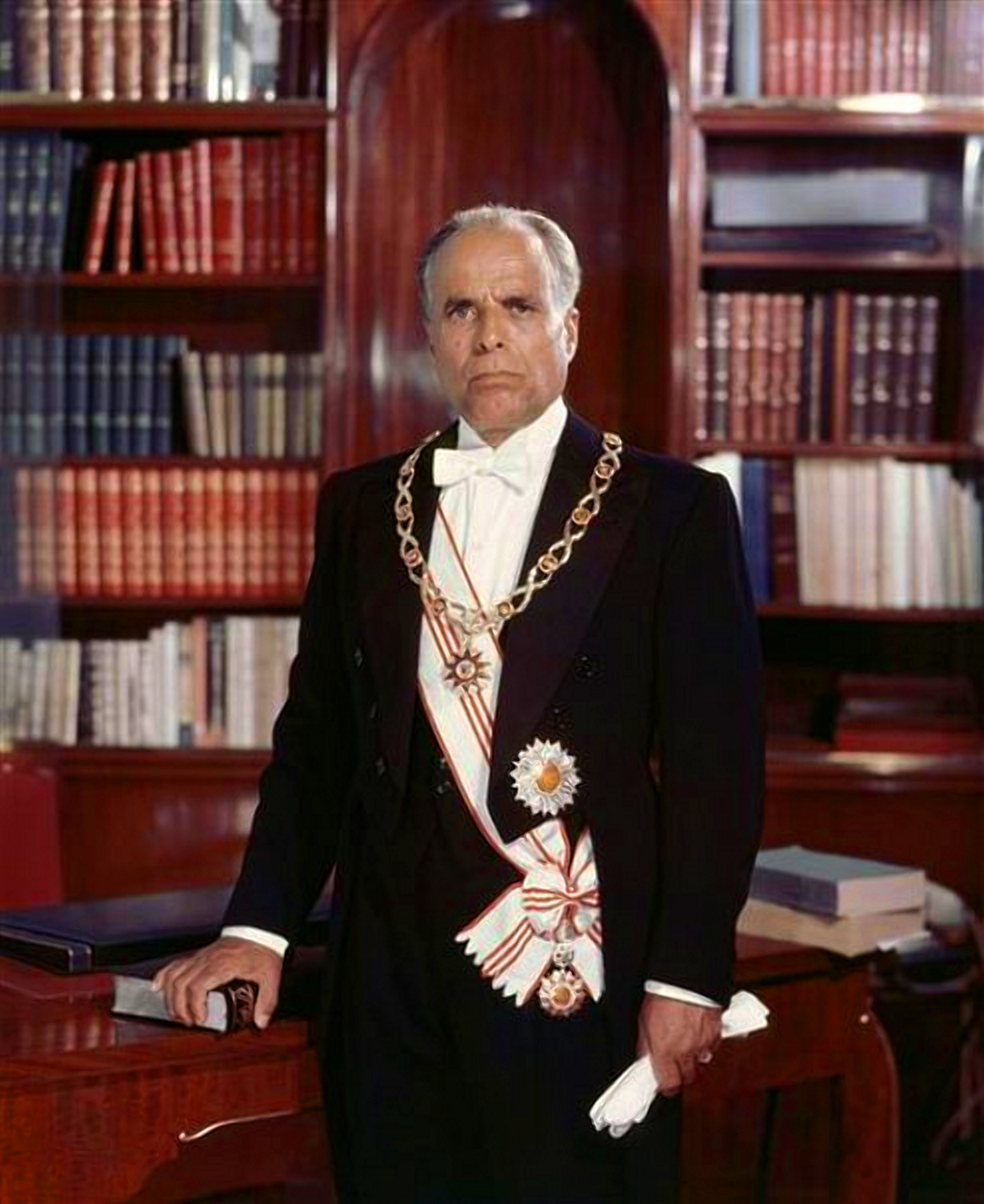
Tunisian leader Habib Bourguiba usually delivered his speeches in Tunisian even for religious celebrations

However, the same period was characterized by the rise of interest toward Tunisian Arabic. Indeed, this period was the beginning of the spread of the formal use of Tunisian Arabic as by Taht Essour. Also, more research about Tunisian was produced, mainly by French and German linguists. Tunisian Arabic became even taught in French high schools, as an optional language.

By the Tunisian independence in 1956, Tunisian Arabic was spoken only in coastal Tunisia while the other regions spoke Algerian Arabic, Libyan Arabic or several Berber dialects. The profusion is from many factors including the length of time the country was inhabited, its long history as a migration land and the profusion of cultures that have inhabited it, and the geographical length and diversification of the country, divided between mountain, forest, plain, coastal, island and desert areas.

That is why Tunisian leader Habib Bourguiba began a trial of Arabization and Tunisification of Tunisia and spread free basic education for all Tunisians. That contributed to the progressive and partial minimisation of code-switching from European languages in Tunisian and the use of code-switching from Standard Arabic. Furthermore, the creation of the Établissement de la radiodiffusion-télévision tunisienne in 1966 and the nationwide spread of television with the contact of dialects led to a dialect leveling by the 1980s.

By then, Tunisian Arabic reached nationwide usage and became composed of six slightly different but fully mutually intelligible dialects: Tunis dialect, considered the reference Tunisian dialect; Sahil dialect; Sfax dialect; southwestern dialect; southeastern dialect and northwestern dialect. Older dialects became less commonly used and began disappearing. Consequently, Tunisian became the main prestigious language of communication and interaction within the Tunisian community and Tunisia became the most linguistically homogeneous state of the Maghreb. However, Berber dialects, Libyan and Algerian Arabic as well as several Tunisian dialects like the traditional urban woman dialect, Judeo-Tunisian Arabic or even several Tunisian structures like lā noun+š, also practically disappeared from Tunisia.

The period after Tunisian independence was also marked by the spread of Tunisian Arabic usage in literature and education. In fact, Tunisian Arabic was taught by the Peace Corps from 1966 until 1993 and more studies were carried out. Some which used new methods like computing operations and the automated creation of several speech recognition-based and Internet-based corpora, including the publicly available Tunisian Arabic Corpus Others, more traditional, were also made about the phonology, the morphology, the pragmatic and the semantics of Tunisian. The language has also been used to write several novels since the 1990s and even a Swadesh list in 2012. Now, it is taught by many institutions like the Institut national des langues et civilisations orientales (in Paris with Tunisian Arabic courses since 1916) and the Institut Bourguiba des Langues Vivantes (in Tunis with Tunisian Arabic courses since 1990). or in French high schools as an optional language. In fact, 1878 students sat for the Tunisian Arabic examination in the 1999 French Baccalauréat. Nowadays, the tendency in France is to implement Maghrebi Arabic, mainly Tunisian Arabic, in basic education.

But, those were not the only trials of Tunisian Arabic in education. A project to teach basic education for the elderly people using Tunisian Arabic was proposed in 1977 by Tunisian linguist Mohamed Maamouri. It aimed to ameliorate the quality and intelligibility of basic courses for elderly people who could not understand Standard Arabic as they did not learn it. However, the project was not implemented.

Nowadays, the linguistic classification of Tunisian Arabic causes controversies between interested people. The problem is caused because of the Arabic dialect continuum. Some linguists, such as Michel Quitout and Keith Walters, consider it an independent language, and some others, such as Enam El-Wer, consider it a divergent dialect of Arabic that is still dependent of Arabic morphology and structures.

Moreover, its political recognition is still limited as it is only recognized in France as a minority language part of Maghrebi Arabic according to the European Charter for Regional or Minority Languages of May 1999. However, even the charter was not agreed on by the Constitutional Council of France because its conflicts with the Article 2 of the French Constitution of 1958. Also, no official recognition or standardization in Tunisia was provided for Tunisian Arabic until 2011 despite the efforts of Tunisian professors Salah Guermadi and Hedi Balegh to prove that Tunisian is a language.

After the Tunisian revolution of 2011 when Tunisian Arabic was the mainly used language of communication, efforts to have the Tunisian language recognised were reinvigorated.

In 2011, the Tunisian Ministry of Youth and Sports has launched a version of its official website in Tunisian Arabic. However, this version was closed after a week of work because of an internet poll that has concluded that 53% of the users of the website were against using Tunisian Arabic in the website.

In 2013, Kélemti initiative was founded by Hager Ben Ammar, Scolibris, Arabesques Publishing House, and Valérie Vacchiani to promote and encourage the creation and publication of written resources about and in Tunisian Arabic.

In 2014, a version of the Tunisian Constitution of 2014 was published in Tunisian Arabic by the Tunisian Association of Constitutional Law.

In 2016 and after two years of work, the Derja Association has been launched by Ramzi Cherif and Mourad Ghachem in order to standardize and regulate Tunisian, to define a standard set of orthographic rules and vocabularies for it, to promote its use in daily life, literature and science, and to get an official recognition for it as a language in Tunisia and abroad. The Derja Association also offers an annual prize, the Abdelaziz Aroui Prize, for the best work written in Tunisian Arabic.

Since the 2011 revolution, there have been many novels published in Tunisian Arabic. The first such novel was Taoufik Ben Brik's Kelb ben Kelb (2013); several prominent novels have been written by Anis Ezzine and Faten Fazaâ (the first woman to publish a novel in Tunisian Arabic). Although often criticized by literary critics, the Tunisian Arabic novels have been commercially successful: the first printing of Faten Fazaâ's third novel sold out in less than a month.

== Distinctive features ==
Tunisian Arabic is a variety of Arabic and as such shares many features with other modern varieties, especially the Maghrebi varieties of Arabic. Some of its distinctive features (compared to other Arabic dialects) are listed here.

- A conservative consonantal phonology (due to Berber substrates), with the pre-hilalian /q/ and interdental fricatives generally maintained. /q/ is usually pronounced /ɡ/ in Bedouin dialects. The interdental fricatives are lost in the dialect of Mahdia, the Jewish dialect of Tunis, and the Jewish dialect of Soussa.
- The use of إنتِي [ˈʔɪnti] in urban varieties meaning "you" when addressing both men and women, and a concomitant loss of second person gender distinction in the verbal morphology. Second person gender distinction is still maintained in rural varieties by using إنتَا /ʔinta/ for male and إنتِي /ʔinti/ for female, with corresponding distinctions in verbal morphology.
- The lack of an indicative prefix in the verbal system, resulting in no distinction between indicative and subjunctive moods.
- The innovation of a progressive aspect by means of the participle قاعد [ˈqɑːʕɪd], originally meaning "sitting"; and the preposition في ['fi] "in" in transitive clauses.
- The distinctive usage of future tense by using the prefixes ماش [ˈmɛːʃ] or باش [ˈbɛːʃ] or ْبِش [ˈbəʃ] + verb that is nearly equivalent to "will" + verb.
- Some vocabulary such as فيسع [ˈfiːsɑʕ] "fast", باهي [ˈbɛːhi] "good" and برشة [ˈbærʃæ] "very much". (e.g.: [ˈbɛːhi ˈbærʃæ]="very good")
- Unlike most of the other Muslim countries, the greeting as-salamu alaykum is not used as the common greeting expression in Tunisia. Tunisians use the expression عالسلامة [ʕæsˈlɛːmæ] (formal) or أهلا [æhlæ] (informal) for greeting. Also, بالسلامة [bɪsːˈlɛːmæ] (formal) or the Italian ciao (informal) or more rarely the Italian arrivederci are used as the Tunisian "goodbye" expression. يعيشك [jʕæjʃɪk] is used as "thank you", as well as شكرا [ˈʃʊkræn]. However, Tunisian people do use some expressions from standard Arabic such as بارك الله فيك [ˈbɑːræk ɑlˤˈlˤɑːhu ˈfiːk] and أحسنت [ʔɑħˈsænt] for thank you. But, these expressions are used only as loan structures from standard Arabic and are not used as they are used in standard Arabic.
- The passive derivation of verbs is influenced by Berber and is different from the one of classical Arabic. It is obtained by prefixing the verb with /t-/, /tt-/, /tn-/ or /n-/ and the choice of one of the four prefixes depends on the used verb (ex: شرب /ʃræb/ "to drink" → تّشرب /ttæʃræb/ "to be drunk").
- Nearly all educated Tunisians can communicate in French, which is widely used in business and as the main language of communication with foreigners. Code switching into French is common in Tunisian.
- Tunisian Arabic is an SVO language and it is most of the time a Null-subject language. In fact, the subject is only written in order to avoid meaning ambiguity.
- Tunisian has more agglutinative structures than Standard Arabic or the other varieties of Arabic, a phenomenon that was further strengthened by the influence of Turkish on Tunisian in the 17th century.

== Dialects ==
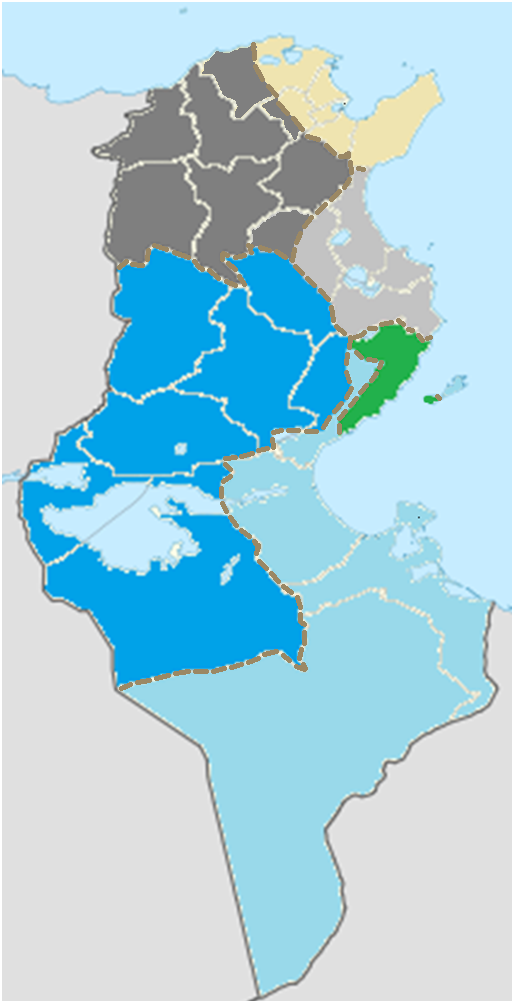
Geographic disposition of the Tunisian Arabic dialects as of 2015. Tunis dialect Sfax dialect Sahel dialect Northwestern Tunisian Southwestern Tunisian Southeastern Tunisian

The Arabic dialects of Tunisia belong to either pre-Hilalian or Hilalian dialectal families. Before 1980, the pre-Hilalian group included old (Baldī) Urban dialects of Tunis, Kairouan, Sfax, Sousse, Nabeul and its region Cap Bon, Bizerte, old Village dialects (Sahel dialects), and the Judeo-Tunisian. The Hilalian set includes the Sulaym dialects in the south and the Eastern Hilal dialects in central Tunisia. The latter were also spoken in the Constantinois (eastern Algeria). Nowadays and due to dialect leveling, the main dialect varieties of Tunisian Arabic are Northwestern Tunisian (also spoken in Northeastern Algeria), southwestern Tunisian, Tunis dialect, Sahel dialect, Sfax dialect and southeastern Tunisian. All of these varieties are Hilalian excepting the Sfax one. Tunis, Sahel and Sfax dialects (considered sedentary dialects) use the voiceless uvular stop [q] in words such as قال /qaːl/ "he said" while southeastern, northwestern and southwestern varieties (considered nomadic dialects) substitute it by the voiced velar stop [ɡ] as in /ɡaːl/. Moreover, only Tunis, Sfax and Sahel dialects use Tunisian phonology. Indeed, northwestern and southwestern Tunisians speak Tunisian with Algerian Arabic phonology, which tends to simplify short vowels as short schwas while southeastern Tunisian speak Tunisian with the Libyan Arabic phonology.

Additionally, Tunis, Sfax and the urban Sahel dialects are known for not marking the second person gender. Hence, the otherwise feminine إنتِي /ʔinti/ is used to address both men and women, and no feminine marking is used in verbs (inti mšīt). Northwestern, southeastern and southwestern varieties maintain the gender distinction found in Classical Arabic:

Dialect group	Masculine	Feminine
Tunis, Sfax, urban Sahel	إنتِي inti + no feminine verb ending	
Northwestern, Southeastern, Southwestern	إنتَا مشيت inta mšīt	إنتِي مشيتي inti mšītī

Furthermore, Tunis, Sfax and Sahel varieties conjugate CCā verbs like mšā and klā in feminine third person and in past tense as CCāt. For example, هية مشات hiya mšāt. However, Northwestern, southeastern and southwestern varieties conjugate them in feminine third person and in past tense as CCat. For example, هية مشت hiya mšat.

Dialect group	3rd person feminine past of mšā
Tunis, Sfax, Sahel	هية مشات hiya mšāt
Northwestern, Southeastern, Southwestern	هية مشت hiya mšat

Finally, each of the six dialects have specific vocabulary and patterns.

=== Tunis ===
As the prestige variety of media, the Tunis dialect is considered the standard form of Tunisian Arabic and is the variety described in pedagogical and reference materials about "Tunisian" Arabic. It is spoken on the Northern East of Tunisia around Tunis, Cap Bon and Bizerte. However, it has a characteristic not shared with some of the other Tunisian Arabic dialects. It distinguishes the three short vowels and tends to pronounce [æ] as [ɛ] and the āš suffix, used in the end of question words, as an [ɛ:h].

=== Sahel ===
The sociolinguistic centre of the Sahel dialect is the city of Sousse. It is known for the use of the singular first person ānī instead of ānā. It is also known for the pronunciation of wā as [wɑː] in some variations and the pronunciation ū and ī as respectively [oː] and [eː] when it is a substitution of the common Classical Arabic diphthongs /aw/ and /aj/. For example, زيت zīt is pronounced as [ze:t] and لون lūn is pronounced as [lɔːn]. Furthermore, when ā, pronounced in most urban varieties as [ɛː], is at the end of the word, it is pronounced as [eː] or [iː] in some varieties. The latter is particularly attested in the town of Msaken. For example, سماء smā is pronounced as [smeː] or [smiː]. Moreover, if a word begins with a consonant cluster starting with /θ/ or sometimes /ð/, these sounds are pronounced respectively as [t] and [d]. For example, ثلاثة /θlaːθa/ is pronounced as [tlɛːθæ]. As well, the Sahel dialect is known for using مش miš instead of موش mūš to mean the negation of future predicted action.

=== Sfax ===
The Sfax dialect is known mostly for its conservation of the Arabic diphthongs /aj/ and /aw/ and of the short /a/ between two consonants and its use of وحيد wḥīd instead of وحود wḥūd to mean the plural of someone. Other dialects have substituted them respectively by /iː/ and /uː/ and dropped the short /a/ between the first and second consonant of the word. It is also known by the substitution of short /u/ by short /i/, when it comes in the beginning of the word or just after the first consonant. For example, خبز /χubz/ is pronounced as [χibz]. It is also known for the use of specific words, like baṛmaqnī meaning window. Furthermore, it is known for the substitution of [ʒ] by [z] when it comes in the beginning of a word and when that word contains [s] or [z] in its middle or end. For example, جزّار /ʒazzaːrˤ/ is pronounced as [zæzzɑːrˤ] and جرجيس /ʒarʒiːs/ is pronounced as [zærzi:s]. Unlike other Tunisian dialects, Sfax dialect does not simplify the last long vowel at the end of a word. It is also known for some specific verbs like أرى aṛā (to see) and the use of the demonstrative articles هاكومة hākūma for those and هاكة hāka (m.) and هٰاكي hākī (f.) for that respectively instead of هاذوكم hāðūkum and هاذاكة hāðāka (m.) and هاذيكة hāðākī (f.) determinants. Finally, the conjugation of mūš as a modal verb uses ماهواش māhūwāš instead of ماهوش māhūš, ماهياش māhīyāš instead of ماهيش māhīš, ماحناش māḥnāš instead of ماناش mānāš and ماهوماش māhūmāš instead of ماهمش māhumš. Sfax dialect is also known for its profusion of diminutives. For example,

- قطيطس qṭayṭas (little or friendly cat) for قطّوس qaṭṭūs (cat).
- كليب klayib (little or friendly dog) for كلب kalb (dog).

=== Northwestern ===
The northwestern dialect is known by pronouncing r as [rˤ] when it is written before an ā or ū. Furthermore, it is known for the substitution of [ʒ] by [z] when it comes at the beginning of a word and when that word contains [s] or [z] in its middle or end. Also, it is known for the pronunciation of ū and ī respectively as [o:] and [e:] when they are in an emphatic or uvular environment. As well, northwestern dialect is known for using مش miš that is pronounced as [məʃ] instead of مانيش mānīš to mean the negation of future predicted action.

Conjugation of the negative particle مش miš:

Form	Northwestern	Common Tunis / Standard form
1st person singular	مشني mišnī	مانيش mānīš
2nd person singular	مشك mišk	ماكش mākš
3rd person masculine	مشّو miššū	موش / ماهوش mūš / māhūš
3rd person feminine	مشها mišhā	ماهيش māhīš
1st person plural	مشنا mišnā	ماناش mānāš
2nd person plural	مشكم miškum	ماكمش mākumš
3rd person plural	مشهم mišhum	ماهمش māhumš

Moreover, northwestern dialect is known for the use of نحنا naḥnā instead of أحنا aḥnā as a plural second person personal pronoun and the southern area of this Tunisian dialect like El Kef is known for the use of ناي nāy or ناية nāya instead of آنا ānā (meaning I) excepting Kairouan that is known for using يانة yāna in this situation.

=== Southeastern ===
The southeastern dialect is known for a different conjugation of verbs ending with ā in the third person of plural. In fact, people speaking this variety of Tunisian Arabic do not add the regular ū suffix after the vowel ā but used to drop the ā and then add the ū. For example, مشى mšā is conjugated as مشوا mšū instead of مشاوا mšāw with the third person of plural. Furthermore, it is known for the substitution of [ʒ] by [z] at the beginning of a word and when that word contains [s] or [z] in its middle or end. Moreover, it is known like the Sahil dialect for the pronunciation /uː/ and /iː/ as respectively [oː] and [eː] when it is a substitution of the common classical Arabic diphthongs /aw/ and /aj/. Furthermore, this dialect is also known for the use of the following personal pronouns:

Meaning	Southeastern form	Common form
I	أنا anā	آنا ānā
We	حنا ḥnā	أحنا aḥnā
You (plural, masc.)	إنتم intumm	انتوما intūma
You (plural, fem.)	إنتن intinn	انتوما intūma
They (masc.)	هم humm	هوما hūma
They (fem.)	هن hinn	هوما hūma

=== Southwestern ===
The southwestern dialect is known for a different conjugation of verbs ending with ā in the third person of plural. In fact, people who are speaking this variety of Tunisian Arabic do not add the regular ū suffix after the vowel ā but used to drop the ā and then add the ū. For example, مشى mšā is conjugated as مشوا mšū with the third person of plural. Furthermore, this dialect is also known for the use of the following personal pronouns:

Meaning	Southwestern form	Common form
I	ناي nāy	آنا ānā
We	حني ḥnī	أحنا aḥnā
You (plural, masc.)	إنتم intumm	انتوما intūma
You (plural, fem.)	إنتن intinn	انتوما intūma
They (masc.)	هم humm	هوما hūma
They (fem.)	هن hinn	هوما hūma

Moreover, it is known for the pronunciation of ū and ī respectively as [o:] and [e:] in an emphatic or uvular environment.

== Use and geographical distribution ==
Tunisian Arabic is the mother tongue of the Arabic-speaking population in Tunisia. It is also the second language of the Berber minority living in the country, particularly in some villages of Djerba and Tataouine.

However, Tunisian Arabic has the role of the low variety in an example of classic diglossia, and Standard Arabic is the high variety. As such, the use of Tunisian Arabic is mainly restricted to spoken domains. as its written and cultural use began in the 17th century and regularly developed since the 20th century only. Now, it is used for a wide range of purposes, including communication, politics, literature, theatre, and music.

=== Society ===
From the 1990s, Tunisians began to write in Tunisian Arabic when communicating on the Internet, especially on social networking sites, and in text messages. This trend accelerated during the 2011 street protests that brought down the regime of Zine El Abidine Ben Ali, in which text messaging and social networking played a major role.

In religion, the use of Tunisian Arabic in promoting Islam is limited although there are some trial efforts. In Christianity, the use of Tunisian Arabic is significant beginning with a 1903 New Testament translation. In 2013 and subsequent years, Tunisian author and linguist Mohamed Bacha published very popular textbooks and references to learn Tunisian Arabic and explore Tunisian culture, aimed to international readers who are fluent in English : Tunisian Arabic in 24 lessons, Tunisian Arabic in 30 lessons, Tunisian Arabic - English dictionary, Tunisian folklore: folktales, songs, proverbs, This unique book contains a selection of Tunisia's oral literature and culture : folktales, proverbs, popular songs. In the latter book, the author Mohamed Bacha adapted into written form (through transliteration) and translated into English some of the most representative oral folklore of Tunisia, while keeping its authenticity and unique cultural flavor. In addition to multilingual editions of oral folktales: Jabra and the lion, in Tunisian Arabic, English, French. Eternal Classic Songs of Tunisia (Tunisian, English, French)

=== Literature ===
Before Tunisian independence, there was a large body of folk tales and folk poems in Tunisian Arabic. It was mainly an oral tradition, told by wandering storytellers and bards at marketplaces and festivals. The most important of these folktales are il-Jāzya il-hlālīya (الجازية الهلالية) and ḥkāyat ummī sīsī w il-ðīb (حكاية أمّي سيسي والذيب). A few years after independence, the more popular ones were recorded for ERTT broadcast, in Tunisian Arabic by Abdelaziz El Aroui, or translated mainly to French and standard Arabic by other authors. The recorded Tunisian folktales were transcribed in Tunisian Arabic using Arabic script only in the 2010s, thanks to the work of the Kelemti Association of the promotion of Tunisian Arabic in 2013 and the work of Karen McNeil of 2014.

As for novels and short stories, most authors who fluently know Tunisian Arabic prefer to write in Standard Arabic or in French. But since the initiative of the Taht Essour and particularly Ali Douagi to use Tunisian Arabic in transcribing dialogues in novels and writing some newspapers, the dialogues in the Standard Arabic Tunisian novels or romans became written in Tunisian Arabic using the Arabic script.

However, since the early 1990s, Hedi Balegh initiated a new trend in Tunisian literature. He was the first to translate a novel to Tunisian Arabic in 1997 and to make collections of Tunisian idioms and proverbs in 1994 using Arabic script. Some authors, particularly Tahar Fazaa (mainly in Tšanšīnāt Tūnsīya (تشنشينات تونسية)) and Taoufik Ben Brik (mainly when writing Kalb Bin Kalb (كلب بن كلب) and Kawāzākī (كوازاكي)) followed him and used Tunisian Arabic in order to write novels, plays and books in Tunisian Arabic.

As for plays in Tunisian Arabic, the first ones were made by the Tunisian-Egyptian Company just after World War I. They faced several objections. However, it acquired general recognition in Tunisia by the end of World War II. After Tunisian independence, the government encouraged the development of theater in Tunisian Arabic through the creation of supporting institutions. That resulted in the creation of notable plays in Tunisian Arabic following the trends of world literature between 1965 and 2005. The main authors of these plays were Jalila Baccar, Fadhel Jaïbi and members of the National Theatre troupes of the Medina of Tunis, El Kef and Gafsa.

Now, plays are almost always written in Tunisian Arabic except when they are placed in a historical setting. Plays written in Tunisian Arabic are widely considered as meaningful and valuable ones.

Since the 2011 Tunisian Revolution, there has been a trend of novels written in Tunisian Arabic. Since Taoufik Ben Brik's Kalb Bin Kalb (كلب بن كلب) in 2013, Tunisian Arabic novels have been written by Faten Fazaâ, Anis Ezzine, Amira Charfeddine, and Youssef Chahed. Translation of Tunisian and world literature into Tunisian Arabic have been done by Dhia Bousselmi and Majd Mastoura.

=== Music ===
The oldest lyrics found written in Tunisian, dates back to the 17th century, by Abu el-Hassan el-Karray, who died in 1693 in the medina quarter of Sfax and wrote a poem in Tunisian Arabic during his youth:

The effective beginning of Tunisian Arabic written songs came in the early 19th century, when Tunisian Jews in the Beylik of Tunis began writing songs in Tunisian Arabic about love, betrayal and other libertine subjects. The current strengthened at the beginning of the 20th century and affected the Tunisian ma'luf and folklore. Judeo-Tunisian song flowered in the 1930s, with such Jewish artists as Cheikh El Afrit and Habiba Msika.

This tendency was promoted by the creation of Radio Tunis in 1938 and the creation of Établissement de la radiodiffusion-télévision tunisienne in 1966, which allowed many musicians to better disseminate their works and helped spread the use of Tunisian Arabic in songs.

At the same time, popular music developed in the early 19th century, using Tunisian Arabic poems accompanied by Tunisian musical instruments like the mizwad. This kind of music was promoted by the National Troupe of the Popular Arts, created in 1962. Later adaptation and promotion of popular songs, especially by Ahmed Hamza and later Kacem Kefi, further developed Tunisian music. Natives of Sfax, they were both influenced by Mohamed Ennouri and Mohamed Boudaya, leading masters of popular music in that city. Nowadays, this kind of music is very popular.

Tunisian Arabic became the main variety used in writing lyrics of songs in Tunisia and even the main technical words in music have their synonyms in Tunisian Arabic.

In the early 1990s, underground music in Tunisian Arabic appeared. This mainly consisted of rap and was not successful in the beginning because of the lack of media coverage. Tunisian underground music, mainly written in Tunisian Arabic, became successful in the 2000s, thanks to its spread over the Internet, and came to involve other alternative genres like reggae and Rock.

In 2014, the first opera songs in Tunisian Arabic had appeared. They were the ones of Yosra Zekri that were written by Emna Rmilli and composed by Jalloul Ayed. In 2018, the Tunisian linguist Mohamed Bacha published Eternal Classic Songs of Tunisia The mythical classic Tunisian songs presented in this book were performed by artists popular in Tunisia's urban centers in the 1950s, 60s, 70s, 80s. The lyrics of these songs are in natural and authentic Tunisian Arabic, the spoken language of Tunisia. The singers performed with Western and Egyptian-like orchestra ensembles, in addition to a Chorus that repeats some verses in a unique Tunisian manner, in some songs like ‘’O The Beauty of The Desert” and ‘’How Could you believe it!?’’ The music of the songs was composed by great professional musicians such as Boubaker El Mouldi, Mohamed Triki, Salah El Mahdi, Ridha Kalaï, Ali Riahi, Kaddour Srarfi, Chedly Anouar, Hedi Jouini. The lyrics written by poets like Omar Ben Salem, Mahmoud Bourguiba, Mohamed Bouthina. Only rarely was the singer himself at the same time the music composer, as in the case of Ali Riahi in some of his songs. Some of the best Tunisian classic songs were selected from the rich traditional musical folklore.

=== Cinema and mass media ===
Of the few domestic movies produced since 1966, many tried to reflect new social dynamics, development, identity research and modernity shock, and were done in Tunisian Arabic. Some of them achieved relative success outside Tunisia, such as La Goulette (ḥalq il-wād (حلق الواد), 1996), Halfaouine: Child of the Terraces (ʿaṣfūr il-sṭaḥ (عصفور السطح), 1990), and The Ambassadors (il-sufaṛā (السفراء), 1975).

Television and radio programs in Tunisian Arabic began officially in 1966 with the establishment of the Établissement de la Radiodiffusion-Télévision Tunisienne. Tunisian Arabic is now widely used for all television and radio programs, with the exception of news, religious programs and historical dramas. There is even several translations of cartoon series in Tunisian Arabic, like during the 1980s Qrīnaṭ il-šalwāš (قرينط الشلواش) and Mufattiš kaʿbūṛa (مفتّش كعبورة). As well, foreign Television series begun to be translated to Tunisian Arabic in 2016. The first translation of foreign television series was entitled Qlūb il-rummān (قلوب الرمان) and was developed by Nessma TV from the Turkish television series Kaderimin Yazıldığı Gün.

Some Tunisian Arabic works acquired some honors in the broader Arab world like the ASBU Festival First Prize in 2015. and the Festival of Arab Media Creation Prize in 2008.

Moreover, since the 1990s, mass media advertisements increasingly use Tunisian Arabic, and many advertising boards have their slogans and the original or alternative company name written in Tunisian.

However, the main newspapers in Tunisia are not written in Tunisian Arabic although there were trials to establish humoristic newspapers in Tunisian Arabic like kull šay b- il-makšūf (كل شيء بالمكشوف) that was directed by Hedi Saidi and Hechmi Bouaziz and led by Ali Douagi and that was issued quite regularly from 23 April 1937 to 22 October 1959. The leading newspapers are still written either in Modern Standard Arabic or in Standard French, even if cartoons in most of them can be written in Tunisian.

== Scripts ==
=== Arabic script ===
The Arabic script used for Tunisian is largely the same as for Arabic. However, it includes additional letters to support /g/ (ڨ), /v/ (ڥ) and /p/ (پ).

The first known use of Arabic script for Tunisian was recorded in the 17th century, when Sheykh Karray wrote several poems in Tunisian Arabic for mystic purposes. However, transcription of Tunisian Arabic was not common until 1903, when the Gospel of John was transcribed in Tunisian Arabic using Arabic script. After the World War I, the use of Arabic script to Tunisian Arabic became very common with the works of Taht Essour. Nowadays, it has become the main script used for Tunisian Arabic, even in published books, but writing conventions for Tunisian Arabic are not standardized and can change from one book to another.

In 2014, Ines Zribi et al. proposed a Conventional Orthography for Tunisian Arabic based on the principles of CODA as proposed in 2012. The orthography is based on eliminating phonological simplifications by comparing the words and structures of Tunisian Arabic by their correspondent etymological equivalent in Modern Standard Arabic. Although the convention is quite important, the orthography does not differentiate between [q] and [g] and does not involve several important phonemes that are mainly used in loanwords.

=== Latin script ===
Phonemic transcription method of Tunisian Arabic and Algerian Arabic into Latin script used by William Marçais in 1908

==== Deutsche Morgenländische Gesellschaft Umschrift ====
In 1845, the Deutsche Morgenländische Gesellschaft or DMG, a German scientific association dedicated to the studies and the languages of the orient, was formed in Leipzig. Soon, the organization developed a transcription system for Arabic in Latin script. Its system was a phonemic transcription of Arabic written with an extended Latin alphabet and macrons for long vowels. However, this Deutsche Morgenländische Gesellschaft transcription was first tried on Tunisian only after the establishment of the French Protectorate of Tunisia in 1881.

The first linguistic study about Tunisian to be completed was of German linguist Hans Stumme, who, from 1893 to 1896, transcribed Tunisian Arabic with the DMG transcription. In addition, from 1897 to 1935, a series of linguistic works were conducted by several French members of the DMG, like William Marçais, Philippe Marçais, David Cohen and Alfred Nicolas. These works included corpuses, grammar books, dictionaries, or studies. By 1935, the DMG transcription included many unique letters and diacritics for Tunisian not used for Arabic, such as, à, è, ù and ì, for short and accentuated vowels. This is the reason why the XIXth international congress of orientalists held in Rome, from 23 to 29 September 1935, adopted a modified simplified version of the DMG transcription specifically for Arabic dialects. From 1935 to 1985, most of the linguists working on Tunisian Arabic such as Gilbert Boris, Hans Rudolf Singer, Lucienne Saada and others, adopted the modified DMG.

As of 2016, the modified DMG is still used by institutions such as SIL International or the University of Vienna for Tunisian Arabic written corpuses and linguistic books.

==== Additional scripts ====
- Phonetic Transcription:

Even if the Deutsche Morgenländische Gesellschaft transcription was abundantly used in early linguistic researches about Tunisian, some trials were performed in order to create alternative Latin scripts and writing methods. The purpose of the trials was to have a simpler and more intuitive Latin Script Writing system than DMG or to try to solve the lack of interconvertibility between scripts as the transcription of Tunisian with the German DMG method was phonetic and not syntactic.

The first successful trial to create a specific Latin script and writing method for Tunisian was the Practical Orthography of Tunisian Arabic, created by Joseph Jourdan in 1913. Its principle was to use French consonant and vowel digraphs and phonology to transcribe non-Latin sounds. In this method, kh is used to transcribe /χ/, ch to transcribe /ʃ/, th to transcribe /θ/, gh to transcribe /ʁ/, dh to transcribe /ð/ or /ðˤ/ and ou to transcribe /u:/, a to transcribe /a:/ and /ɛː/, i to transcribe /i:/ and e to transcribe the short vowels. The layout was successful because it did not involve additional Latin letters and could be transcribed efficiently. It was used in the later linguistic works of Joseph Jourdan about Tunisian Arabic until 1956. Moreover, it is still presently used in French books to transcribe Tunisian Arabic. The method was used in 1995 by the Tunisian Arabizi, an Arabic chat alphabet, converting the consonant digraphs into digits. It uses 2 to transcribe a glottal stop, 3 to transcribe /ʕ/, 5 to transcribe /χ/, 6 to transcribe /tˤ/, 7 to transcribe /ħ/, 8 to transcribe /ʁ/ and 9 to transcribe /q/. The ch, dh, and th digraphs were kept in Tunisian Arabizi. Vowels are transcribed according to their quality and not to their length as a is used to transcribe short and long [ɐ] and [æ], e is used to transcribe short and long [ɛ] and [e], u is used to transcribe short and long [y], eu is used to transcribe short and long [œ], o is used to transcribe short and long [o], ou is used to transcribe short and long [u] and i is used to transcribe short and long [i] and [ɪ]. Sometimes, users differentiate between short and long vowels by dropping short ones. Like all other Arabic chat alphabets, its use spread considerably during the 1990s mainly with the Tunisian young people. Nowadays, it is used principally on social networks and mobile phones. Also, during the Tunisian Revolution of 2011, Tunisian Arabizi was the main script used for message transmission on internet. After 2011, more interest was given to Tunisian Arabizi and in 2013, a concise grammar book about Tunisian, written with Tunisian Arabizi, was issued. In 2016, Tunisian Arabizi has been recognized by Ethnologue as an official informal script for writing Tunisian. However, this chat alphabet is not standardized and is seen as informal as the Arabic sounds are transcribed as numbers and letters at the same time. The use of digits as numerals and letters at the same time made transcribing Tunisian difficult to users and did not linguistically solve the matters that were faced by the Practical Transcription.

Although they are popular, both methods have problems such as the possibility of ambiguity between digraphs, the absolute certainty of getting a rate of graphs per phoneme that is significantly superior to 1 and of getting independent consonants having the same transliteration as the digraphs, and the lack of disambiguation between /ð/ and /ðˤ/.

A translation of Le Petit Nicolas by Dominique Caubet uses a phonetic transcription.

Logo of Peace Corps

Separately, another Latin script transcription method was created by Patrick L. Inglefield and his team of linguists from Peace Corps Tunisia and Indiana University in 1970. Letters in this method can be written in lowercase letters only, and even T and S are not equivalent to t and s as T is used to transcribe /tˤ/ and S is used to transcribe /sˤ/. Moreover, three additional Latin letters are used in this writing method that are 3 (/ʕ/), ø (/ð/) and ħ (/ħ/). Four common English digraphs are used that are d͟h (/ðˤ/), g͟h (/ʁ/), t͟h (/tˤ/) and s͟h (/ʃ/). In order to distinguish the digraphs from the independent letters written like the digraphs, the digraphs are underlined. As for the vowels, they are written as å (glottal stop or /ʔ/), ā (/æ/), ā: (/ɛ:/), a (short a or /a/), a: (long a or /a:/), i (short i or /i/), i: (long i or /i:/), u (short u or /u/), u: (Long u or /u:/). This method was used in the Peace Corps books about Tunisian Arabic until 1993, when Peace Corps Tunisia became inactive.

- Syntactic Transliteration:

After years of works on a phonetic transliteration of Tunisian, linguists decided that the transliteration should be mainly syntactic. Timothy Buckwalter created an orthography-based transcription of Arabic texts during his work for Xerox. Buckwalter transcription was created in order to avoid the effect of phoneme simplification of spoken Modern Standard Arabic on the morphological analysis of the language. In 2004, Tunisian linguist Mohamed Maamouri proposed to use the same transliteration for Arabic dialects and mainly Tunisian. This idea was later developed by Nizar Habash and Mona Diab in 2012 into CODA-based Buckwalter transliteration that eliminates phonological simplification in the Arabic dialects through doing comparisons between dialectal structures and their Modern Standard Arabic equivalents. In 2013, a complete work about the regulations of the use of the Buckwalter transliteration for Tunisian was issued by Ines Zribi and her team from the University of Sfax. In fact, a morphological analysis method and a conventional orthography for Tunisian Arabic using this method were posted by 2014. However, the method is currently used for computer operations only and it is not used by people, as it involves some ASCII non-alphanumeric graphs as letters, and S, D and T do not correspond respectively to the same phonemes as s, d and t. Furthermore, p does not correspond to /p/ but to ﺓ. Even the modified version of Buckwalter transliteration that was proposed by Nizar Habash et al. in 2007 and that substitute ASCII non-alphanumeric graphs by additional Latin letters did not solve the other problems of the original Buckwalter transliteration. That is why both versions of Buckwalter transliteration were not adopted for daily use in writing Tunisian Arabic and are adopted only for NLP purposes.

== Vocabulary ==
=== Non-Arabic words ===
The most immediately apparent difference between Tunisian and Standard Arabic is the extensive use of native, substratum words of Latin and Berber etymology or borrowed ones from Italian, Spanish, French and Turkish. For example, electricity is كهرباء kahraba in standard Arabic. It is تريسيتي trīsītī in Tunisian Arabic (a word used mainly by older people), from the French électricité. Other loans from French include برتمان buṛtmān (flat), and بياسة byāsa (coin). Furthermore, there are words and structures that came from Turkish, such as ڨاوري gāwrī (foreigner) (Gavur) as well as the suffix of occupation as in بوصطاجي būṣṭājī (post officer) and كوّارجي kawwāṛjī (football player). A sample of words derived from Latin, French, Italian, Turkish, Berber, Greek or Spanish is below:

Tunisian Arabic	Standard Arabic	English	Etymology of Tunisian Arabic
بابور ḅaḅūr	سفينة /safiːna/	ship	Turkish: vapur meaning "steamboat"
باكو bakū	صندوق /sˤundu:q/	package	Italian: pacco
بانكة ḅanka	بنك /bank/	bank	Italian: banca
بلاصة bḷaṣa	مكان /makaːn/	place	Spanish:plaza
داكردو dakūrdū	حسنا /ħasanan/	okay	Italian: d'accordo
فيشتة fišta	عيد /ʕiːd/	holiday	Latin: festa
كرّوسة kaṛṛūsa	عربة /ʕaraba/	carriage	Italian: carrozza
كيّاس kayyās	طريق معبد /tˤarīq maʕbad/	roadway	Spanish: calles
كوجينة kūjīna	مطبخ /matˤbax/	kitchen	Italian: cucina
كسكسي kusksī	كسكسي /kuskusi/	couscous	Berber: seksu
كلسيطة kalsīta	جورب /jawrab/	sock	Italian: calzetta
قطّوس qaṭṭūs	قط /qitˤː/	cat	Latin: cattus
سبيطار sbīṭaṛ	مستشفىً /mustaʃfa:/	hospital	Latin: hospitor
سفنارية sfinārya	جزر /jazar/	carrot	Greek: σταφυλῖνος ἄγριος (stafylīnos ā́grios)

Those words are not to be confused with the actual use of French words or sentences in everyday speech by Tunisians (codeswitching), which is common in everyday language and business environments. However, many French words are used within Tunisian Arabic discourse, without being adapted to Tunisian phonology, apart from the French r [ʁ], which is often replaced, especially by men, with [r]. For example, many Tunisians, when asking "How are you?" will use the French "ça va?" instead of, and in addition to the Tunisian لاباس (lebes). It is difficult in this case to establish whether it is an example of using French or borrowing. In general, concerning the case of loanwords, they are adapted to Tunisian phonology for years until they become pronounced with basic Tunisian Arabic sounds only. For example, the French word apartement became برتمان buṛtmān and the Italian word pacco became باكو bakū.

=== Shift in meanings ===
The greatest number of differences between Tunisian and standard Arabic is not due to the influences from other languages but to a shift in meaning of several Arabic roots. For example, /x-d-m/ means "serve" in Standard Arabic but "work" in Tunisian Arabic; meanwhile, /ʕ-m-l/ means "work" in Standard Arabic but has a broader meaning of "do" in Tunisian Arabic; and /m-ʃ-j/ in Tunisian Arabic means "go" rather than "walk" as in Standard Arabic. In general, meaning shift happens when there is a lexical implication of the society speaking the language so the social situation and the thoughts of the speakers of the languages obliged them to change the meaning of some words so their language could be adapted to their situation and that is exactly what happened in Tunisia. In fact, the influences of rhetoric and semantic structures from other contact languages like French helped the meaning shift in Tunisian.

=== Word fusion ===
In Tunisian, some new words and structures were created through the fusion of two words or more. Almost all question words fall into the latter category. The question words are noticeable by beginning or ending with the sound š or āš and are not to be confused with the negation mark, š, which agrees verbs, as in mā mšītš ما مشيتش (I did not go). The table below shows a comparison of various question words in Tunisian, Standard Arabic and English:

Tunisian Arabic	Construction	Standard Arabic	English
škūn شكُون	āš + kūn آش + كون	من /man/	who
šnūwa شنُوَّة (masc.) šnīya (fem.) شنِيَّة āš آش	āš + n + (h)ūwa آش + ن + هو āš + n + (h)īya آش + ن + هي āš آش	ماذا /maːða/	what
waqtāš وَقتِاش	waqt + āš وقت + آش	متى /mata/	when
lwāš لوِاش	l- + āš ل + آش	لماذا /limaːða/	for what reason
ʿlāš علِاش	ʿlā + āš على + آش	لماذا /limaːða/	why
kīfāš كِيفِاش	kīf + āš كيف + آش	كيف /kajfa/	how
qaddāš قَدِّاش	qadd + āš قدّ + آش	كم /kam/	how much
mnāš منِاش	min + āš من + آش	من أين /man ʔajna/	from what
fāš فِاش	fī + āš في + آش	في من /fi man/	in what, what
wīn وِين	w + ayn و + اين	أين /ʔajna/	where

Some of the question words can be merged with other structures such as the prepositions and object pronouns. For example, "who are you" becomes شكونك إنت škūnik intī or simply شكونك škūnik and "how much is this" becomes بقدّاش b-qaddāš. Another example of word fusion in Tunisian is the formation of numerals between 11 and 19, which are pronounced as one word, composed of the name of the digit obtained by subtracting 10 to the number and the suffix طاش ṭāš derived from the standard Arabic word عَشَرَ /ʕaʃara/, those numbers are in order: احداش aḥdāš, اثناش θṇāš, ثلطّاش θlaṭṭāš, أربعطاش aṛbaʿṭāš, خمسطاش xmasṭāš, سطّاش sitṭāš, سبعطاش sbaʿṭāš, ثمنطاش θmanṭāš and تسعطاش tsaʿṭāš.

=== Pattern and root-based creation of new words ===
In Tunisian Arabic, as in other Semitic languages, the creation of new words is based on a root and pattern system, also known as the Semitic root. That means that new words can be created through the association of a root that is composed most of the time of three letters that have a meaning with a rhythm or pattern that informs about the position of the object in the fact. For example, K-T-B is a root meaning to write and مفعول maf‘ūl is a pattern meaning that the object submitted the fact. Thus, the combination of the root and the given pattern render maKTūB, which means something that was written.

=== Conjugation in Tunisian ===
Tunisian Arabic verbs are commonly described using Latin-script transcription based on the Standard Tunisian (Latin) Alphabet.

The following table shows the conjugation of the CVC verb qal (“to say”):

Conjugation of the CVC verb "Qal" (to say)
Pronouns in Eng	Pronouns	Present	Past	Future	Imperative	Passive form	Subjunctive I	Subjunctive II	Conditional
I	Ena	Nqoul	Qolt	Beç nqoul		Netqal	Kên nqoul	Rani nqoul	Taw nqoul
You sg.	Inti	Tqoul	Qolt	Beç tqoul	Qoul	Tetqal	Kên tqoul	Rak tqoul	Taw tqoul
She	Hia	Tqoul	Qalet	Beç tqoul		Tetqal	Kên tqoul	Rahi tqoul	Taw tqoul
He	Houa	Yqoul	Qal	Beç yqoul		Yetqal	Kên yqoul	Rahu yqoul	Taw yqoul
We	Aħna	Nqoulu	Qolna	Beç nqoulu		netqalu	Kên nqoulu	Rana nqoulu	Taw nqoulu
You pl.	Ntouma	Tqoulu	Qoltu	Beç tqoulu	Qoulu	Tetqalu	Kên tqoulu	Rakom tqoulu	Taw tqoul
They	Huma	Yqoulu	Qalu	Beç yqoulu		Yetqalu	Kên yqoulu	Rahom yqoulu	Taw yqoulu

Tunisian verbs can be classified according to the number and position of consonants and vowels. Although more than eleven patterns exist, the most frequently used are CVC, CCV, CCVC, CVCC and CV.

Examples of infinitive verbs from each category:

- CVC: qal (to say), çêf (to see), qaas (to measure), zeed (to add/to increase)
- CVCC: ħatt (to put), ħäbb (to love/to want), jeewb (to respond/to answer), xaalf (to disagree)
- CCV: klee (to eat), msce (to go), qra (to read/to study)
- CCVC: scrab (to drink), sreq (to steal), staad (to hunt), mteez (to be different or special at something)
- CV: je (to come), ra (to see, less commonly used)

==== Verbs starting with one consonant ====
CVC verbs follow this general pattern:

The form of conjugation for CVC verbs
Pronouns in Eng	Pronouns	Present	Past	Imperative
I	Ani	n+gav	gav+t	
You sg.	Inti	t+gav	gav+t	gav
He	Houa	y+gav	infinitive	
She	Hia	t+gav	infinitive+(e)t	
We	Aħna	n+gav+u	gav+na	
You pl.	Entom	t+gav+u	gav+tu	gav+u
They	Huma	y+gav+u	infinitive+u	

CVCC verbs are divided into simple-voweled and double-voweled types, which conjugate differently.

Simple-voweled CVCC verbs
Pronouns in Eng	Pronouns	Present	Past	Imperative
I	Ani	n+gav	infinitive+it	
You sg.	Inti	t+gav	infinitive+it	gav
He	Houa	y+gav	infinitive	
She	Hia	t+gav	infinitive+et	
We	Aħna	n+gav+u	infinitive+ina	
You pl.	Entom	t+gav+u	infinitive+itu	gav+u
They	huma	y+gav+u	infinitive+u	

Double-voweled CVCC verbs
Pronouns in Eng	Pronouns	Present	Past	Imperative
I	Ani	n+infinitive	CVC+e+C+t	
You sg.	Inti	t+infinitive	CVC+e+C+t	infinitive
He	Houa	y+infinitive	infinitive	
She	Hia	t+infinitive	infinitive+et	
We	Aħna	n+infinitive+u	CVC+e+C+na	
You pl.	Entom	t+infinitive+u	CVC+e+C+tu	infinitive+u
They	huma	y+infinitive+u	CVC+e+C+u	

Examples:

- Jeewb: Huma → y+infinitive+u → yjeewbu (“they answer”)
- Seefr: Aħna → CVC+e+C+na → seeferna (“we travelled”)

The form labelled “gav” (grammatical aspect of the verb) is obtained by replacing the vowel of the CVC or CVCC stem according to the tense.

gav chart for CVC verbs
Example	V	Vs (Present)	Vs (Past)	Vs (Imperative)	Meaning
Qal	a	ou	o	ou	"to say"
Scêf	ê	ou	o	ou	"to see"
Qaas	aa	i	e	i	"to measure"
Zeed	ee	i	e	i	"to add"

Examples of application:

- Ani: n+gav(qal) → n+qoul → nqoul (“I say”)
- Entom: gav(zeed)+tu → zed+tu → zedtu (“you added”)

Exceptions include verbs such as thaë (“to be lost”) and xaf (“to be scared”).

gav chart for CVCC verbs
Example	V	Vs (Present)	Vs (Past)	Vs (Imperative)	Meaning
Ħatt	a	o		o	"to put"
Ħäbb	ä	e		e	"to love/want"
Xaalf	aa				"to disagree"
Jeewb	ee				"to respond/answer"

Further examples:

- Fädd: Entom → t+gav(fädd)+u → tfeddu (“you get bored”)
- Ħatt: Hia → infinitive+et → ħattet (“she put”)
- Ëaawd: Inti → infinitive → ëaawd (“repeat!”)

Verbs that begin with two consonants follow different patterns.

== Phonology ==
There are several differences in pronunciation between Standard and Tunisian Arabic. Nunation does not exist in Tunisian Arabic, and short vowels are frequently omitted, especially if they would occur as the final element of an open syllable, which was probably encouraged by the Berber substratum. However, there are some more specific characteristics related to Tunisian Arabic like the phenomenon of metathesis.

=== Metathesis ===
Metathesis is the shift of the position of the first vowel of the word. It occurs when the unconjugated verb or unsuffixed noun begins with CCVC, where C is an ungeminated consonant and V is a short vowel. When a suffix is added to this kind of noun or when the verb is conjugated, the first vowel changes of position and the verb or noun begins with CVCC. For example:

- (he) wrote in Tunisian Arabic becomes كتب kteb and (she) wrote in Tunisian Arabic becomes كتبت ketbet.
- some stuff in Tunisian Arabic becomes دبش dbaš and my stuff in Tunisian Arabic becomes دبشي dabši.

Simply put:

$$\begin{cases}C_1C_2VC_3 + V... = C_1VC_2C_3V...\\C_1C_2VC_3 + C_x... = C_1C_2VC_3C_x...\end{cases}$$

To put it to the test:

$$\begin{cases}\text{sqaf + ek = saqfek}\quad\text{('your roof')}\\\text{sqaf + hə = sqafhə}\quad\text{('her roof')}\end{cases}$$

Littoral variety:

The English pronoun	Pronoun	Dbaš	Wḏen	ʕmor
I	Ēni	Dabši	Weḏni	ʕomri
You sg.	Enti	Dabšek	Weḏnek	ʕomrek
He	Howwə	Dabšu	Weḏnu	3omru
She	Heyyə	Dbašhə	Wḏenhə	ʕmorhə
We	Aħnə	Dbašnə	Wḏennə	ʕmornə
You pl.	Entūmə	Dbaškom	Wḏenkom	ʕmorkom
They	Hūmə	Dbašhom	Wḏenhom	ʕmorhom

=== Stress ===
Stress is not phonologically distinctive and is determined by the word's syllable structure. Hence,

- it falls on the ultimate syllable if it is doubly closed: سروال sirwāl (trousers).
- Otherwise, it falls on the penultimate syllable, if there is one: جريدة jarīda (newspaper).
- Stress falls on all the word if there is only one syllable within it: مرا mṛa (woman).
- Affixes are treated as part of the word: نكتبولكم niktbūlkum (we write to you).

For example:

- جابت jābit (She brought).
- ما جابتش mā jābitš (She did not bring).

=== Assimilation ===
Assimilation is a phonological process in Tunisian Arabic. The possible assimilations are:

/ttˤ/ > /tˤː/	/tˤt/ > /tˤː/	/χh/ > /χː/	/χʁ/ > /χː/
/tɡ/ > /dɡ/	/fd/ > /vd/	/ħh/ > /ħː/	/nl/ > /lː/
/sd/ > /zd/	/td/ > /dː/	/dt/ > /tː/	/ln/ > /nː/
/hʕ/ > /ħː/	/tð/ > /dð/	/hħ/ > /ħː/	/nr/ > /rː/
/nf/ > /mf/	/qk/ > /qː/	/kq/ > /qː/	/lr/ > /rː/
/ndn/ > /nː/	/ħʕ/ > /ħː/	/ʁh/ > /χː/	/ʕh/ > /ħː/
/ʃd/ > /ʒd/	/fC/^{1} > /vC/^{1}	/bC/^{2} > /pC/^{2}	/nb/ > /mb/
/ʕħ/ > /ħː/	/tz/ > /d͡z/	/tʒ/ > /d͡ʒ/	

- ^1 Only if C is a voiced consonant.
- ^2 Only if C is a voiceless consonant.

=== Consonants ===
Tunisian Arabic qāf has [q] and [ɡ] as reflexes in respectively sedentary and nomadic varieties: he said is [qɐːl] instead of [ɡe̞ːl ~ ɡæːl]). However, some words have the same form [ɡ] whatever the dialect: cow is always [bɐɡrɐ] (the /g/ deriving from an originally Arabic [q]), and a specific species of date is always [dɘglə] (the /g/ deriving from an originally Semitic [q] - e.g. Aramaic: /diqla/: date tree). Sometimes, substituting [g] by [q] can change the meaning of a word. For example, garn means "horn" and qarn means "century". Interdental fricatives are also maintained for several situations, except in the Sahil dialect. Furthermore, Tunisian Arabic merged /dˤ/ ⟨ض⟩ with /ðˤ/ ⟨ظ⟩.

Consonant phonemes of Tunisian Arabic
		Labial		Interdental		Dental/Alveolar		Palatal	Velar	Uvular	Pharyngeal	Glottal
		plain	emphatic	plain	emphatic	plain	emphatic	Palatal	Velar	Uvular	Pharyngeal	Glottal
Nasal		m m	(mˤ) ṃ			n n	(nˤ) ṇ					
stop	voiceless	p p				t t	tˤ ṭ		k k	q q		(ʔ)
stop	voiced	b b	(bˤ) ḅ			d d			ɡ g			
Affricate	voiceless					(t͡s) ts		(t͡ʃ) tš				
Affricate	voiced					(d͡z) dz						
Fricative	voiceless	f f		θ þ		s s	sˤ ṣ	ʃ š		χ x	ħ ḥ	h h
Fricative	voiced	v v		ð ð	ðˤ ḍ	z z	(zˤ) ẓ	ʒ j		ʁ ġ	ʕ ʿ	
Trill						r r	rˤ ṛ					
Approximant						l l	ɫ ḷ	j y	w w			

Phonetic notes:

- The emphatic consonants /mˤ, nˤ, bˤ, zˤ/ rarely occur, and most of them are found in words of non-Arabic etymology. Minimal pairs are not always easy to find for these contrasts, but there are nonetheless examples, which show that these marginal forms do not represent allophones of other phonemes. For example:

/baːb/ [bɛːb] "door" and /bˤaːbˤa/ [ˈbˤɑːbˤɑ] "Father"
/ɡaːz/ [ɡɛːz] "petrol" and /ɡaːzˤ/ [ɡɑːzˤ] "gas"

These emphatic consonants occur before or after the vowels /a/ and /aː/. A different analysis is that the posited allophones of /a/ and /aː/ are phonemically distinct, and it is the marginal emphatic consonants that are allophonic.

- /p/ and /v/ are found in words of non-Arabic etymology and are usually replaced by /b/, like in ḅāḅūr and ḅāla. However, they are preserved in some words, like pīsīn and talvza.
- /t͡ʃ/ and /d͡z/ are rarely used, for example tšīša, dzīṛa and dzāyir.
- The glottal stop /ʔ/ is usually dropped but tends to occur in the learned register, in loans from Standard Arabic, often in maṣdar (verbal noun) forms at the onset of the word but also in other words like /biːʔa/ "environment" and /jisʔal/ "he asks", though many (mainly less educated) speakers substitute /ʔ/ for /h/ in the latter word.
- Like in Standard Arabic, shadda "gemination" is very likely to occur in Tunisian. For example, haddad هدد meaning to threaten.

=== Vowels ===
There are two primary analyses of Tunisian vowels:

- Three vowel qualities, /a, i, u/ and a large number of emphatic consonants, namely /tˤ, sˤ, ðˤ, rˤ, lˤ, zˤ, nˤ, mˤ, bˤ/. /a/ has distinct allophones near guttural (emphatic, uvular and pharyngeal) consonants ([ɐ], [ä]) and near non-guttural consonants ([æ]).
- Four vowel qualities, /æ, ɐ, i, u/, and only the three phonemic emphatic consonants /tˤ, sˤ, ðˤ/. The other emphatic consonants are allophones found in the environment of /ɐ/.

The first analysis is suggested by comparing other Maghrebi Arabic dialects, like Algerian and Moroccan Arabic, where the same phenomenon of vocalic allophony happens for /u/ and /i/ as well. Regardless of the analysis, Hilalian influence has provided the additional vowels /eː/ and /oː/ to the Sahil and southeastern dialects. These two long vowels are reflexes of the diphthongs /aj/ and /aw/.

Tunisian Arabic vowels. It is unclear if the vowels written a are allophones or phonemic.
		Front			Back	
		unrounded		rounded	Back	
		short	long	long	short	long
Close		ɪ i	iː ī	(yː) ü	u u	uː ū
Open-mid	oral		eː ā	(œː) ë	(ʊː) ʊ	(oː) o
Open-mid	nasal	(ɛ̃) iñ			(ɔ̃) uñ	
Open	nasal				(ɑ̃) añ	
Open	oral	æ a			ɐ a	ɐː ā

- By assuming that pharyngealisation is a property of consonants, most dialects have three vowel qualities /a, i, u/, all also distinguished for length, as in Standard Arabic.
- The length distinction is suspended at the end of the word. A final vowel is realised long in accent-bearing words of one syllable (For example, جاء jā [ʒeː] he came), otherwise short.
- In non-pharyngealised environments, the open vowel /a/ is [e] in stressed syllables and [æ] or [ɛ] in unstressed syllables. In pharyngealised environments, the open vowel is [ɑ].
- /ɔː/ and nasal vowels are rare in native words, for most of the varieties of Tunisian and mainly for the Tunis dialect, like منقوبة mañqūba and لنڨار lañgār and mainly occur in French loans. /yː/ and /œː/ only exist in French loanwords.
- Unlike other Maghrebi dialects, short u and i are reduced to [o] and [e] when written between two consonants unless when they are in stressed syllables.

=== Syllables and pronunciation simplification ===
Tunisian Arabic has a very different syllable structure from Standard Arabic like all other Northwest African varieties. While Standard Arabic can have only one consonant at the beginning of a syllable, after which a vowel must follow, Tunisian Arabic commonly has two consonants in the onset. For example, Standard Arabic book is كتاب /kitaːb/, while in Tunisian Arabic it is ktāb. The syllable nucleus may contain a short or long vowel, and at the end of the syllable, in the coda, it may have up to three consonants ما دخلتش (/ma dχaltʃ/ I did not enter). Standard Arabic can have no more than two consonants in this position. Word-internal syllables are generally heavy in that they either have a long vowel in the nucleus or consonant in the coda. Non-final syllables composed of just a consonant and a short vowel (light syllables) are very rare, generally in loans from Standard Arabic. Short vowels in this position have generally been lost (Syncope), resulting in the many initial CC clusters. For example, جواب /ʒawaːb/ reply is a loan from Standard Arabic, but the same word has the natural development /ʒwaːb/, which is the usual word for letter. As well as those characteristics, Tunisian Arabic is also known for differently pronouncing words according to their orthography and position within a text. This phenomenon is known as pronunciation simplification and has four rules:

- [iː] and [ɪ], at the end of a word, are pronounced [i]. Also, [uː] and [u] are pronounced [u]. [aː], [ɛː], [a] and [æ] are pronounced [æ]. For example, yībdā is practically pronounced as [jiːbdæ]
- If a word finishes with a vowel and the next word begins with a short vowel, the short vowel and the space between the two words are not pronounced (Elision). The phenomenon is seen clearly when Arabic texts are compared to their Latin phonemic transliteration in several works.
- If a word begins with two successive consonants, an epenthetic [ɪ] is added at the beginning.
- A sequence of three consonants, not followed by a vowel, is broken up with an epenthetic [ɪ] before the third consonant. For example: يكتب yiktib, يكتبوا yiktbū.

== Morphology ==
Nouns and adjectives in Tunisian Arabic are classified into nouns that have a regular plural and nouns that have an irregular plural. Several nouns in Tunisian Arabic even have dual forms. Irregular or broken plurals are broadly similar to those of Standard Arabic. gender shift is achieved for singular nouns and adjectives by adding an -a suffix. However, this cannot occur for most plural nouns.

Tunisian Arabic has five types of pronouns: personal, possessive, demonstrative, indirect object and indefinite pronouns. Unlike in Standard Arabic, there is a unique pronoun for the second person singular and a unique pronoun for the second person in plural. Furthermore, there are three types of articles: definite, demonstrative and possessive articles. Most of them can be written before or after the noun.

As for verbs, they are conjugated in five tenses: perfective, imperfective, future, imperative, conditional present and conditional past Tenses and in four forms: affirmative, exclamative, interrogative and negative forms. They can be preceded by modal verbs to indicate a particular intention, situation, belief or obligation when they are conjugated in perfective or imperfective tenses. Questions in Tunisian Arabic can be āš (wh question) or īh/lā (yes–no question).

The question words for āš questions can be either a pronoun or an adverb. As for negation, it is usually done using the structure mā verb+š.

There are three types of nouns that can be derived from verbs: present participle, past participle and verbal noun. There are even nouns derived from simple verbs having the root fʿal or faʿlil. The same is true in Standard Arabic. Tunisian Arabic also involves several prepositions and conjunctions. These structures ultimately derive from those of Standard Arabic, even if they are radically different in modern Tunisian because of heavy influence from Berber, Latin and other European languages.

== Semantics and pragmatics ==
Discourses in Tunisian Arabic are likely to use some rhetorical styles like metaphors. Furthermore, Tunisian Arabic styles and tenses hold several figurative meanings. For example, the use of past tense can mean that the situation is uncontrollable. As well, the use of the third person pronouns can be figurative to mean saints and/or supernatural beings and the use of demonstrative can have figurative meanings like underestimation. Moreover, the name of some parts of the body can be used in several expressions to get figurative meanings. That is entitled the embodiment.

Some structures like nouns and verbs have figurative meanings, and the use and the adoption of these figurative meanings depends on the circumstances of the discourse like the political situation of the country and the ages of the people participating in the discussion.

== International influences ==
Several Tunisian words were used in the lyrics of some famous Arabic songs and poems like ʿaslāma of Majda Al Roumi. Furthermore, some famous Arabic singers were acknowledged for singing several old Tunisian Arabic songs like Hussain Al Jassmi and Dina Hayek. Tunisian Arabic influenced several Berber dialects by transferring to them several Arabic or Tunisian structures and words. It was as well the origin of Maltese and some of its words like بريك Brīk and فريكساي frīkasāy were inspired by French as loanwords. The Il-Ṭalyānī Tunisian Arabic word meaning "the Italian" (الطلياني) was used as a title of a novel in standard Arabic which received the Booker Prize for Arabic literature in 2015. Also, several prestigious television series from other Arabic countries like the Lebanese Cello Series involved a character talking in Tunisian Arabic.

== See also ==
- Mediterranean Lingua Franca
- African Romance
- Varieties of Arabic
- Maghrebi Arabic
- Maltese language
- Libyan Arabic
- Algerian Arabic
- Moroccan Arabic
- Berber languages
- Punic language
- Phoenician language
