= Taht Essour =

Taht Essour (جماعة تحت السور , jmāɛit taḥt is-sūr), meaning "under the ramparts" in English, is a group of Tunisian intellectuals formed during the interwar period, from all disciplines, who were meeting in a namesake caffé situated in the popular district of Bab Souika (against the ramparts of the Medina of Tunis).

It notably included Moustapha Amine, Habib Cheikhrouhou, Mohamed Arbi, Aboul-Qacem Echebbi, Tahar Haddad, Abdelaziz El Aroui, Abderrazak Karabaka, Mustapha Khraïef, Hédi Jouini, Hédi Laâbidi, Zine el-Abidine Snoussi and Khemaïs Tarnane as well as Ali Douagi who narrated the group's life in one of his works.
