= Charfeddine =

Charfeddine is a surname. Notable people with the surname include:

- Amira Charfeddine, Tunisian novelist
- Ridha Charfeddine (born 1952), Tunisian politician and sports manager
- Taoufik Charfeddine, Tunisian politician, Minister of the Interior in 2020-2021
