= Walid Soliman =

Walid Soliman may refer to:

- Walid Soliman (footballer), Egyptian footballer
- Walid Soliman (writer), Tunisian writer
