= Bashir Khrayyef =

- البشير خريف
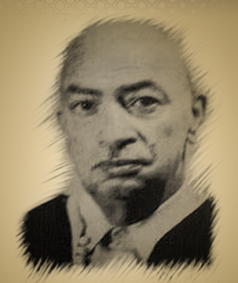
- Born: April 10, 1917; Nefta, Tunisia
- Died: December 17, 1983 (aged 66)
- Occupation: Novelist

Bashir Khrayyef (Arabic: البشير خريٌف, romanized: al-Bashīr Khurayyif; April 10, 1917 – December 17, 1983) was a Tunisian writer, considered "the father of the realist novel in Tunisia." He is known for his harshly realistic descriptions of Tunisian society as well as for his use of Tunisian Arabic in the dialogues of his novels.

== Early life and education ==
Khrayyef was born on April 10, 1917, in Nefta, government of Tozeur in southwest Tunisia. He came from a literary family; his brother was the poet Mustafa Khrayyef.

== Writing career ==
Khrayyef's most famous historical novel, Barq al-layl ("Night Lightning," 1961) is set in Tunis during 16th-century Hafsid rule. The novel treats the topics of slavery and racism through the love story of the protagonist, a black slave.

Arguably his most influential novel, al-Digla fī ‘arājīnihā ("Dates in their Branches," 1969), is set in an oasis community in the southwest desert of Tunisia in the 1910s–1930s. The remoteness of the community is emphasized through the use of a local dialect of Tunisian Arabic. The book also articulates the relationship between the Tunisian labor movement and the later independence movement.

His final novel, Ḥubbak darbānī ("Your Love is Maddening," 1980) recounts an impossible love between a man and a prostitute.

== Bibliography ==
=== Novels ===
- (1961) Barq al-layl (برق الليل (Night lightning))
- (1969) al-Digla fī ‘arājīnihā (الدڤلة في عراجينها (A date in its cluster))
- (1980) Ḥubbak darbānī (حبك درباني (Your love is maddening)), written in 1958

=== Short story collections ===
- (1975) Mashmūm al-Full (مشموم الفل (Jasmine bouquet)), included the stories "Khalīfat al-ʼaqraʻ" خليفة الأقرع and "Maḥfaẓa al-samār" (محفظة السمار (The woven wallet)), previously published in the magazine al-Fikr in 1965 and 1970

=== Other Stories ===
- Nokhal Baya (1936)
- Lilet loutya (1937)
- Hobbek derbani (1959)
- Ballara (1992)

== Awards ==
- Ali Belhouane Municipal Prize, 1960
- Grand Prize for Literature and Thought, 1981
- Great Mantle of Culture, 1990
