= Derja Association =

Derija Association (جمعية دارجة in Arabic; Association Derja in French) is a group that advocates for the use of Tunisian Arabic (also known as derja 'common') as a written language. It argues for an expanded public role for the vernacular language as an authentic expression of Tunisian identity and culture. It holds an annual conference and awards prizes for literature written in Tunisian.

== Activities ==
The Derja Association holds an annual conference, scheduled to coincide with International Mother Language Day. with guest speakers who present about Tunisian language. Association president, Ramzi Cherif, has described the purpose of these conferences as "raising the value and recognition of Tunisian" as well as developing it into an "independent" language.

A particular focus of the association is advancing the status of Tunisian as a written language. To this end, the association maintains a library of materials written in Tunisian Arabic and offers downloadable keyboards (in Arabic letters and Latin letters) on its website. It also advocates for the adoption of Tunisian as an official language in Tunisia, second to Standard Arabic.

== Prizes ==
At the annual conference, the association awards several prizes for literature written in Tunisian Arabic: the Ali Douagi Prize for best work in Tunisian Arabic; the Abdelaziz El Aroui Prize; and the Hedi Balegh Prize for translation. The prizes are all named after 20th-century Tunisian literary figures who contributed works in Tunisian Arabic. Ali Douagi wrote plays and short stories in which the characters' dialogue was written in Tunisian. Abdelaziz El Aroui told traditional Tunisian folktales on his popular radio (and later television) programs. Hedi Balegh was a pro-vernacular advocate from the late 20th century who, in addition to other contributions, translated Le Petit Prince into Tunisian Arabic.

The Tunisian Writers' Union also issues a prize called the Ali Douagi Prize, which is awarded at the annual Tunis Book Fair and is one of the most important literary prizes in Tunisia. This has caused confusion and some have criticized the Derja Association for choosing the same name as the more prominent prize. The president of the Tunisian Writers' Union, Slaheddine Lahmadi, after mistaken reports that Faten Fazaâ had won the Union's Ali Douagi Prize, expressed that Tunisian vernacular "is not a literary language" and called for all books written in Tunisian to be "withdrawn from libraries."

== Leadership ==
- President: Ramzi Cherif (رمزي الشريف)

== Prize winners ==
| Year | Ali Douagi Prize | Abdel Aziz Aouri Prize | Derja Association Prize | Hedi el-Blegh Prize |
|---|---|---|---|---|
| 2020 | Faten Fazaâ, Shraʿ el-ḥub | | | |
| 2019 | Amira Charfeddine, Wild Fadhīla | Faten Fazaâ, W-min el-ḥub mā fshel | | Dhia Bousselmi, Laghrīb (trans.) |
| 2018 | Faten Fazaâ, ʾAsrār ʿāʾilīyah | el-Khrafēt | Anis Ezzine, el-Khaṭīfah | |
