= Salih al-Souissi al-Qayrawani =

Tunisian poet and social reformer

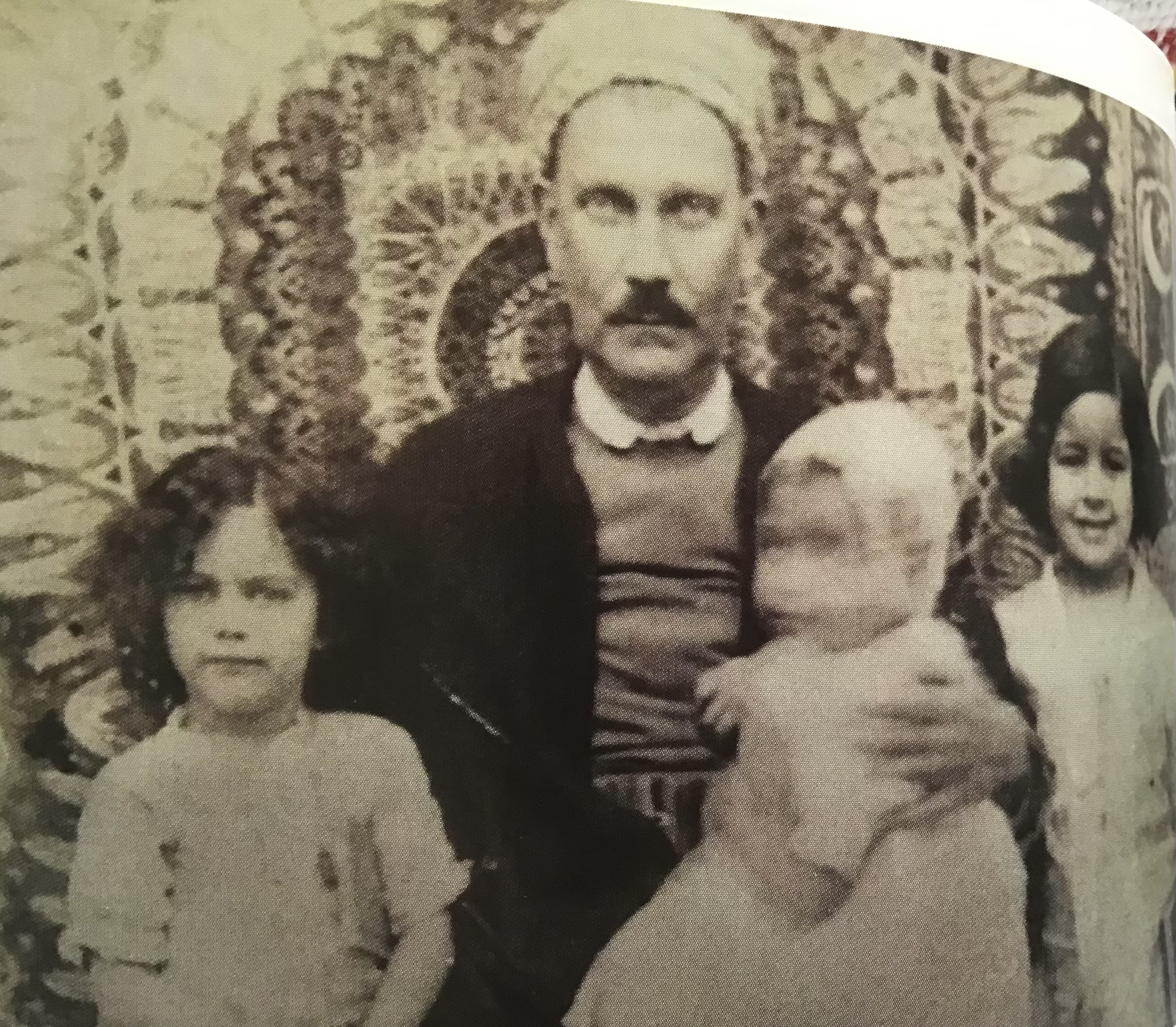
- Salih al-Souissi with his daughters. Taken in the 1930s
- Born: 1871; Qayrawan
- Died: 1941 February 18; Qayrawan
- Occupations: Poet, writer, social reformer and political activist

Salih al-Souissi al-Qayrawani (1871-18 February 1941) was a journalist, poet, Qayrawanese notable, social reformer and political activist, credited by Tunisian intellectual Professor Ahmed Touili as being the “Father of the Tunisian novel.”

== Life ==
Salih al-Souissi was born to a middle-class Sharifian family in the holy Islamic city of Qayrawan. At the age of five, his family moved to the capital Tunis, where they lived for the next ten years. In Tunis, the young al-Souissi studied at a traditional Islamic Kuttab. He returned to Qayrawan in 1886, without having receiving any higher education. His father died within a year of his return. He began writing in the 1890s and continued until his death in 1941.

France occupied Tunisia in 1881 when Souissi was ten years old. Colonial rule and the cultural challenges it generated dominated Souissi's writings and public life. He founded the proto-nationalist Qayrawan literary club, al-Khawarnaq. He was also associated with the anti-colonial Young Tunisians group and later the pro-independence Destour Party, even becoming Assistant Deputy Secretary of the group for its Qayrawan branch. In this capacity, Souissi led several notable campaigns against the French administration. These included: an unpopular edict moving the grain market outside the city walls; a requirement for locals to guard French crops as precaution against theft and a petition to require non-Muslims to take off footwear, while visiting the city’s two main mosques.

Souissi’s activities were deemed radical enough by the French authorities to impose two periods of exile (1897 in the southern town of Tozeur, and later in Beja). But despite his opposition to colonial rule, Souissi never advocated violent resistance.

In 1910, on behalf of Qayrawan, he sent a letter to the French National Assembly, commiserating over the floods Paris was suffering from. The colonial authorities believed his feelings towards them ambivalent enough to propose that the L’Academie Francaise award him a prestigious Palme D’Or in the hope his criticism be moderated. This he declined.

Souissi’s writings encompassed a wide variety of forms, including Maqamat , an autobiography, a novel, "al-Hayfa’ wa-Siraj al-Layl", and even a proto-nationalist song book for school children, "Al-Anashid al-Maktabiya lil-ashabiba al-Madrasiya". Newspaper articles made up the bulk of his work and gave him a small, if irregular income. Souissi contributed to some seventeen publications, largely Tunisian, but also Egyptian and Syrian.

== Influences ==
An avid reader of Egypt-based Muslim reformers, such as Jamal al-Din al-Afghani and Muhammad Abduh, Souissi saw himself as firmly part of the wider Renaissance, or Nahda, that swept the Arab and Muslim world of the nineteenth century. Egypt provided the location for Tunisia’s first novel, "al-Hayfa’ wa-Siraj al-Layl", published in serialized form in 1906. The Al-Khawarnaq literary group took its name from a sixth century Arab Lakhmid dynasty fortification, instrumental in defeating the Byzantines in the year 581. Tunis-based Muslim scholar, Shaikh Muhammad al-Nakhli, a father-figure to other reformers of the period, was also an important guide for Souissi.

Like those of his mentors, Souissi’s intellectual energies were focused on how to revive Arab and Islamic societies. And like them, Souissi identified the Islamic world’s material backwardness relative to the West as stemming from centuries-long cultural decline The solution, Souissi argued, was to return to the idealized values of the Islamic Golden Age. He saw no contradiction between this and modernity, and was an advocate of women's rights and science education.

Pan-Arab interests aside, Souissi was, first and foremost, a son of Qayrawan. As Tunisia’s capital until from the seventh to 13’th century, and home of the first mosque in North Africa, Qayrawan, and its people, dominate his writings, both as back drop, and subject matter. He even wrote a guide book - Daleel al-Qayrawan – detailing Qayrawan historic personages and architectural heritage.

Souissi, is little known outside his native land, but is recognized by his countrymen "as a pioneer of modern Tunisian literature". He has a street named after him in his hometown.

Souissi was active in charity work, among other things, raising funds for the local branch of the Red Crescent

== Published Works ==
- Al-Hayfa’ wa-Siraj al-Layl (Tunisian Publishing House, 1906, 1921, 1978)
- Tarjamat al-Mu’allif bi-qalimihi (Tunisian Publishing House, 1906)
- Khasouma Bayna Madina wa Idara (Tunisian Publishing House, 1921).
- Kitab Manjam al-Tibar fi al-Nathr wa-Shi’ir (Goldmine of Prose and Poetry, Maktaba al-Ilmiya, 1906)
- Fears of Orphans and Poor People (Tunisian Publishing House, 1917)
- Daleel al-Qayrawan (Tunisian Publishing House, 1911)
- Zafiraat al-Dhamir (Signs of Conscience: Beit al-Hikma, 1911)
- Apologia for the Prophet Muhammad (Unknown date, publisher)
- Al-Anashid al-Maktabiya lil-ashabiba al-Madrasiya (Edition: Anahdha Tunis, 1926)
- Autobiography (Tunisian Publishing House, 1897)
- Maqamat (Tunisian Publishing House, 1978)
- Al-Majaami’ al-Adabiya (Collected Poems - Ministry of Culture, 1977)

== Unpublished Manuscripts ==
- Safina Nuh (Noah’s Ark, 1906)
- Kitab al-Janna (The Book of Heaven, 1929)
- Tarikh Wafiyaat A’adhum al-U’laama wa al-Rijaal al-Shaahir (History of the Greatest Scientists and Famous Men, undated).
