= Le Temps (Tunisian daily newspaper) =

French language daily newspaper in Tunisia

Le Temps is a Tunisian French-language daily newspaper published in Tunis since 1 June 1975. It was founded by Habib Cheikhrouhou (1914–1994) who previously launched the Arabic-language daily Assabah in 1951.

Le Temps caused controversy during the Ramadan in 1975 when it featured a book entitled The True Image of Islam written by Slaheddine Kechrid. The book presented a conservative approach to Islam.
