= Bikdash Arabic Transliteration Rules =

Bikdash Arabic Transliteration Rules are a set of rules for the romanization of Arabic that is highly phonetic, almost one-to-one, and uses only two special characters, namely the hyphen and the apostrophe as modifiers. This standard also includes rules for diacritization, including tanwiin.

This transliteration scheme can be thought of as a compromise between the Qalam transliteration and the Buckwalter Transliteration. It represents consonants with one letter and possibly the apostrophe (or single quotation mark) as a modifier, and uses one or several Latin vowels to represent short and long Arabic vowels. It strives for minimality as well as phonetic expressiveness. It does not distinguish between the different shapes of the hamza since it assumes that a software implementation can resolve the differences through the standard rules of spelling in Arabic ar:إملاء.

Note: The Arabic words in this article are written using the Bikdash Arabic Transliteration Rules.

== Guiding Principles ==
The rules were designed with the following principles in mind :

- Capital and small symbols of the same English letter represent in general different sounds or different Arabic letters. In general, capital letters are emphatic versions of small letters whether vowels or consonants.
- The Arabic script should be deducible from its transliteration unambiguously and without necessarily understanding the meaning of the Arabic text. The reverse should also be possible when the Arabic script is fully diacritized or vowelled (i.e. muxakkal with kasrah, fatHat', Dammat', xaddat', tanwiin and other Harakaat.). BATR must be high-quality to allow writing the qureaan or Arabic poetry exactly.
- BATR should be highly phonetic in the sense that a person with no knowledge of Arabic should be able to read and pronounce the Arabic text with "reasonable" accuracy. When the principles of BATR are explained, this person should be able to approximate the sound of the Arabic text with high accuracy.
- Long vowels of Classical Arabic are represented by doubled symbols: ii, aa, and uu, and i, a, and u represent short versions (kasrah, fatHat', Dammat'). In general, combinations of vowels are allowed to express different vowels or intonations including vernacular or colloquial or other nonstandard vowels. For instance, ai represents the Egyptian-dialect vowel in fain? (meaning "where?").
- When a vernacular Arabic word can be said, pronounced, or written in several forms, one of which agrees with Classical Arabic, then this latter form is adopted.

== Transliteration tables ==
Arabic letters	ا	ب	ت	ث	ج	ح	خ	د	ذ	ر	ز	س	ش	ص	ض	ط	ظ	ع	غ	ف	ق	ك	ل	م	ن	ه	و	ي / ى
DIN 31635	ʾ / ā	b	t	ṯ	ǧ	ḥ	ḫ	d	ḏ	r	z	s	š	ṣ	ḍ	ṭ	ẓ	ʿ	ġ	f	q	k	l	m	n	h	w / ū	y / ī
Buckwalter	A	b	t	v	j	H	x	d	*	r	z	s	$	S	D	T	Z	E	g	f	q	k	l	m	n	h	w	y
Qalam	' / aa	b	t	th	j	H	kh	d	dh	r	z	s	sh	S	D	T	Z	`	gh	f	q	k	l	m	n	h	w	y
BATR	A / aa	b	t	c	j	H	K	d	z'	r	z	s	x	S	D	T	Z	E	g	f	q	k	l	m	n	h	w / uu	y / ii
IPA (MSA)	ʔ, aː	b	t	θ	dʒ ɡ ʒ	ħ	x	d	ð	r	z	s	ʃ	sˤ	dˤ	tˤ	ðˤ zˤ	ʕ	ɣ	f	q	k	l	m	n	h	w, uː	j, iː

hamza is always represented by e. The correct spelling form is deducible from standard rules of spelling when the word is fully voweled. This is in contrast to Buckwalter Transliteration where several symbols are needed; e.g., hamza on alif is represented by > while hamza on waaw is represented by &.

ealif: In general, ealif is represented by aa or A. The ealif Al-waSl is represented by eo while ealif maqSuurat' is represented by aaa.

Harakaat
- fatHat': a
- Dammat': u
- kasrat': i
- fatHatayn: aN
- Dammatayn: uN
- kasratayn: iN
- shaddat' or xaddat' is represented by the letter repeated
- sukūn: o or -o-
- taae marbuuTat': t'
- taTwiil:_
