= Messaouda Boubaker =

Tunisian novelist and short story writer

- مسعودة بنت أحمد بن بوبكر
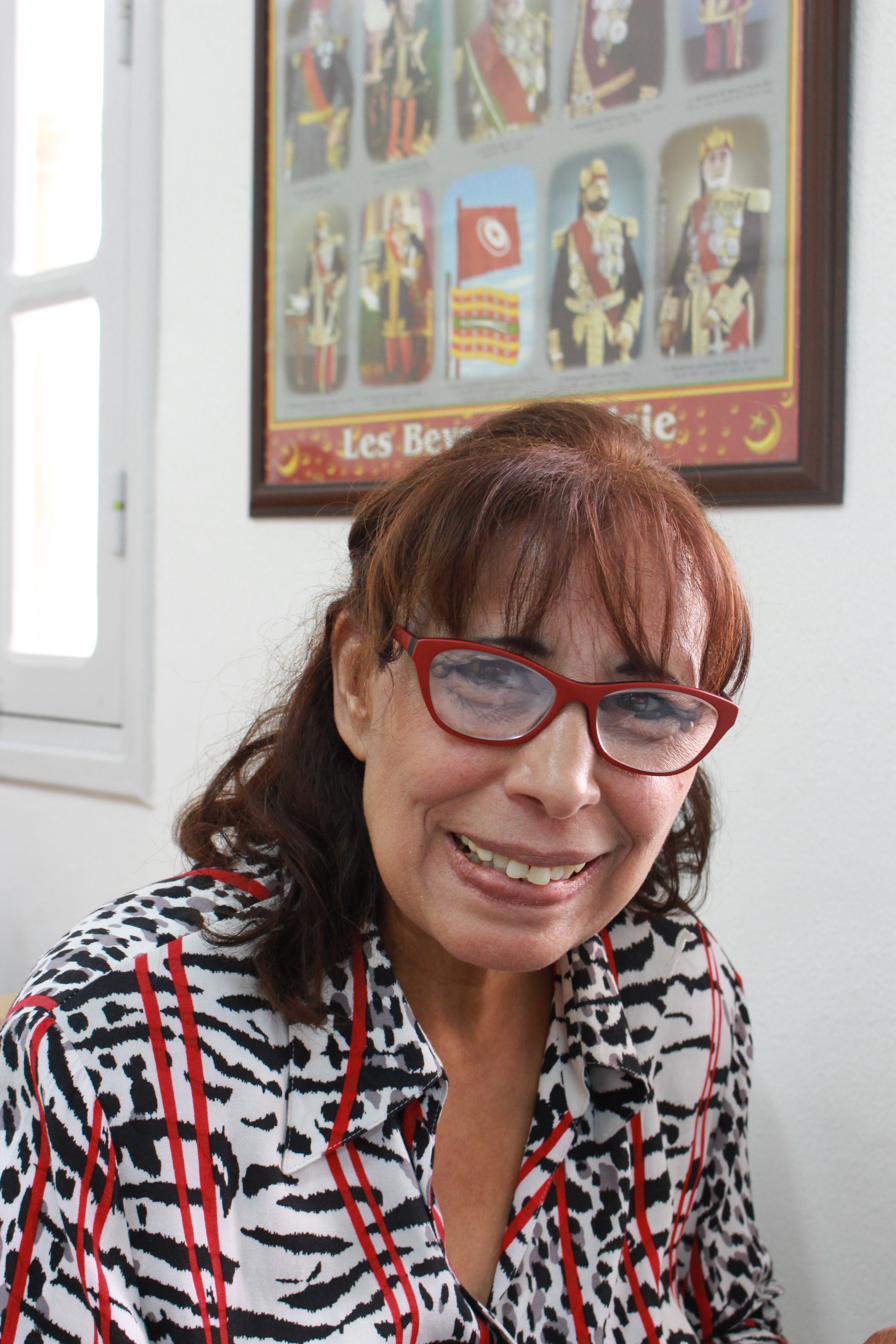
- Born: February 19, 1954 (age 72)
- Citizenship: Tunisia
- Occupation: Writer • Novelist
- Writing career
- Language: Arabic

Messaouda Boubaker (Arabic: مسعودة بنت أحمد بن بوبكر, romanized: Masʿūdah Būbakar; born 19 February 1954) is a Tunisian novelist and short story writer who writes in Arabic.

After the Tunisian Revolution, Boubaker joined the country's civil society organizations as a political activist. In response to a young man who told her to stop protesting and go back to her kitchen where she belonged, she wrote a collection of short stories titled Adhal ahki (I Continue Narrating, 2013). Like several other Tunisian women writers she was keen to continue her work, explaining that only death could silence her.

Her novel Perle et ambre (Pearl and Amber, 2005) includes the mystical black African Chama, a descendant of the female magicians of Timbuktu. Among her other novels are Laylat al-ghiyab (1997), Trushqana (1999], Wada‘an Hammurabi (2002), Juman wa ‘anbar ( 2007), al-Alif wa al-nun (2009) and Adhal ahki (2013).
