= Taoufik Ben Brik =

Tunisian journalist and writer

Taoufik Ben Brik (born 1960 in Jerissa) is a Tunisian journalist.

== Career ==
Brik is a prominent critic of the former Tunisian President Zine El Abidine Ben Ali and an outspoken critic of censorship in the Middle East. He has published numerous articles, and collections of articles as books, abroad that describe the difficult economic conditions in the country, political corruption, and lack of free speech. In 2000, he was accused of publishing false information and other spurious charges, and went on a hunger strike in protest. He has been periodically detained in Tunisia and prevented from travelling, and his family has also been harassed as a way to intimidate him and prevent him from speaking out against the regime.

He was incarcerated on October 29, 2009 on trumped-up charges of assaulting a citizen after a traffic incident. The Court of Appeal upheld a sentence of nine years on 3 January 2010 in a trial that "confirmed the complete absence of independence of the Tunisian legal system" according to the defendant's French lawyer, William Bourdon.

On April 27, 2010, he was released from prison after serving 6 months. He attended World Press Freedom Day in Paris on May 3, 2010, at the Reporters Without Borders offices and told journalists that he would stand for the presidency of Tunisia in 2014, explaining that President Zine El Abidine Ben Ali would be past the age set in the Constitution of Tunisia. After the 2011 Tunisian Revolution which ousted Ben Ali, Ben Brik declared his candidacy in the upcoming 2011 Tunisian presidential election.

== Major publications ==
His books include:

- Chronique du mouchard (2001)
- Une si douce dictature, Chroniques tunisiennes 1991-2000 (2000)

== Awards ==
Taoufik Ben Brik has received several awards: the Grand Prize of the Association of Tunisian Journalists (AJT) for Best Journalistic Work (1989), the AJT Human Rights Award (1990), the CREDIF Award (1991), the UNDP Award (1992), the Dashiell-Hammett and Lillian-Hellman Awards, the Human Rights Watch Award, and the El Khabar Omar-Ourtilène International Award (2000).

In 2012, he was nominated for the Nobel Prize in Literature. In 2018, he received the highest distinction from the Tunisian General Labor Union.
