= Habib Cheikhrouhou =

Tunisian journalist

Habib Cheikhrouhou (born 9 July 1914, Sfax, Tunisia – died 27 January 1994) was a Tunisian journalist who in 1951 founded Dar Assabah, the parent company that publishes the Assabah and Le Temps daily newspapers in Tunis, Tunisia.
