= Ahmed Touili =

Tunisian academic (1942–2022)

- أحمد الطويلي
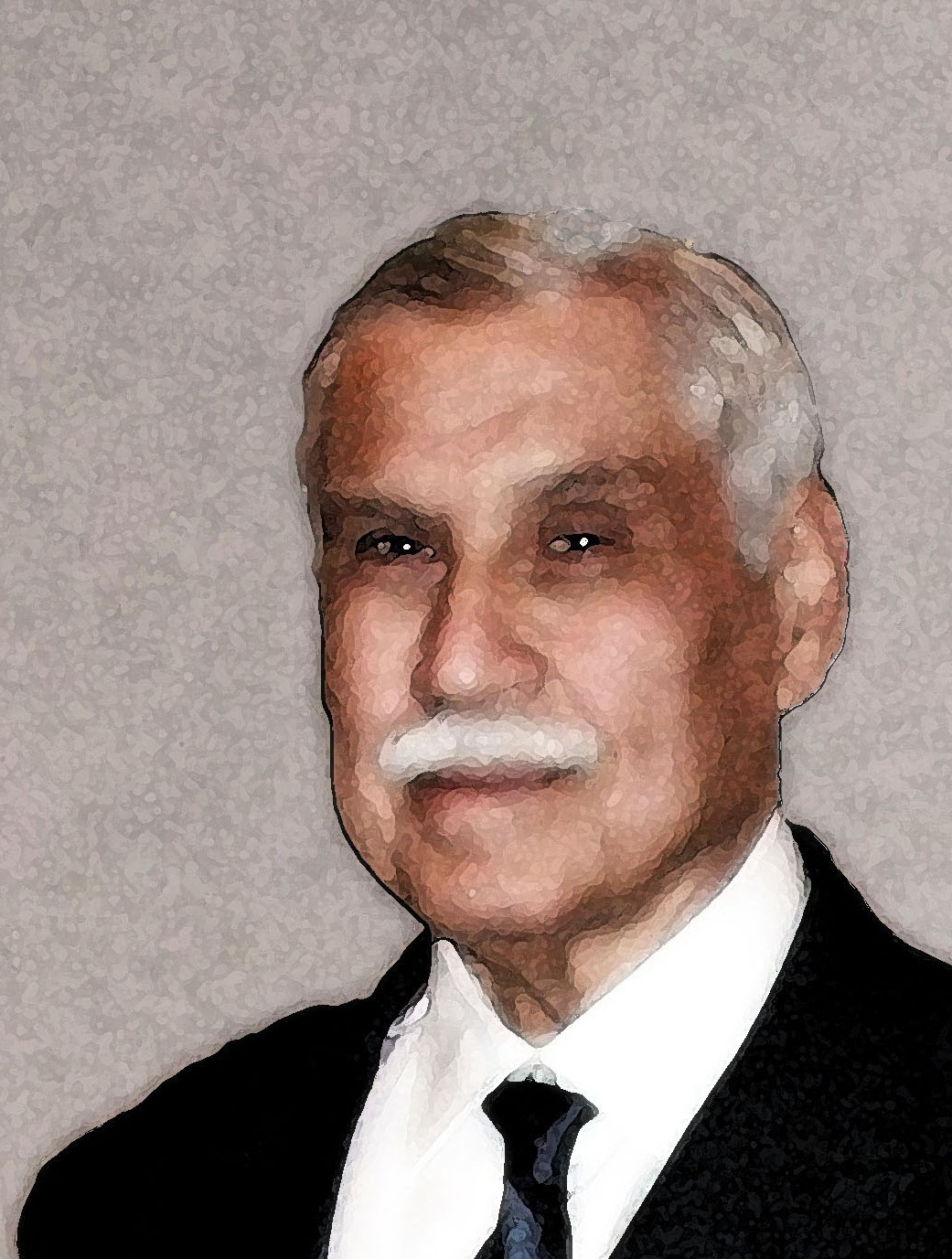
- Portrait of Touili (2012)
- Born: 10 May 1942; Kairouan, French Protectorate of Tunisia, France
- Died: 12 January 2022 (aged 79); Tunis, Tunisia
- Burial place: Jellaz Cemetery
- Education: Sadiki College
- Occupation: Professor

Ahmed Touili (Arabic: أحمد الطويلي; 10 May 1942 – 12 January 2022) was a Tunisian academic.

== Biography ==
A doctor in Arabic literature, Touili taught at the Hankuk University of Foreign Studies, Qatar University, and Norfolk State University. He became a professor at Tunis University and was the author of approximately one hundred books on Arabic and Islamic literature and civilization.

Touili died in Tunis on 12 January 2022, at the age of 79.

== Publications ==
- La littérature tunisienne à l'époque hafside (2004)
- Voyage d'Orient et d'Occident (2004)
- Personnalités tunisiennes (2004)
- Mâlik ibn Anas et les imams de la sunna (2007)
- L'histoire de la culture et de la civilisation kairouanaise (2009)
- Faits notables à Kairouan (2009)
- Histoire de Kairouan (2009)
- Contrat de mariage kairouanais (2010)
- L'éclat culturel de Tunis durant les périodes médiévale et moderne
- Les lieux de culture à Tunis à l'époque hafside
- La Tunisie, source d'inspiration des poètes
- De la tolérance et de la réforme chez des intellectuels tunisiens (XIXe et XXe siècles)
- Le mouvement réformiste en Tunisie
- Le collège Sadiki : histoire d'une genèse
- Lectures dans le patrimoine arabe et islamique
- De Séoul à Singapour
