= Faten Fazaâ =

- Born: Tunisia
- Occupation: Novelist
- Writing career
- Notable work: ʾAsrār ʿāʾilīyah (أسرار عائلية (Family Secrets)
- Notable awards: Ali Douagi Prize for Derja Literature (2020, 2018); Abdelaziz Aroui Prize (2019)

Faten Fazaâ (Arabic: فاتن الفازع) is a Tunisian novelist and the first woman to write a novel in Tunisian Arabic.

== Biography ==
Faten Fazaâ was born and raised in Tunis, Tunisia. She is the daughter of the well-known Tunisian writer and scriptwriter Tahar Fazaa.

Following a difficult marriage and divorce, Fazaâ began writing on Facebook in 2013 or 2014, quickly amassing followers who enjoyed her writing and encouraged her. She began to write a screenplay, but her writing was interrupted when she emigrated to Germany. It was after the death of her grandmother, who had raised her, that Fazaa began to write her first novel, ʾAsrār ʿāʾilīyah, as a way of dealing with her grief and connecting with her grandmother.

This success took the author by surprise: she recounts that she had never planned to write, and in school she wasn't extraordinary in the subject. She had expected to "sell 300 copies and be done with it."

Her following novels were also successful: as of May 2020 she had sold a total of 30,000 books, and her most recent novel's initial run of 5,000 copies sold out is less than a month.

Fazaâ has two children and currently lives in Germany.

== ʾAsrār ʿāʾilīyah (Family Secrets) ==
Asrār ʿaʾilīyah was the first Tunisian Arabic novel written by a woman. It is part of a recent trend of Tunisian novels published in the vernacular language rather than Standard Arabic.

The novel is semi-auto-biographical. It tells the story of Ghalia, a young mother of two who, in the first chapter, leaves her restrictive husband. She tries to reclaim her freedom and her enjoyment of life, but encounters severe difficulties along the way. In the course of her struggle, we meet several other characters—Ghalia's husband, her sister and disabled nephew, a very intelligent but disadvantaged woman who works as a prostitute, and others—many of whom talk directly to the reader, telling their stories in the first person.

It was published in the spring of 2018; as of July 2020 it was in its thirteenth edition. The novel is "one of the highest-selling novels in Arabic," according to the Booksellers' Union in Tunisia.

== Awards ==
- (2018) Derja Association Ali Douagi Prize (for ʾAsrār ʿāʾilīyah)
- (2019) Derja Association Abdelaziz Aroui Prize (for Wa min al-ḥubb mā fashala)
- (2020) Derja Association Ali Douagi Prize (for Sharaʿ al-ḥubb)

== Publications ==
- (2018) ʾAsrār ʿāʾilīyah (أسرار عائلية (Family Secrets))
- (2019) Wa-min al-ḥubb mā fashal (ومن الحب ما فشل (Some Love Fails))
- (2020) Sharaʿ al-ḥubb (شرع الحب (The Law of Love))
- (2021) Hysteria (هيستيريا)
