= Walid Soliman (writer) =

Tunisian essayist (born 1975)

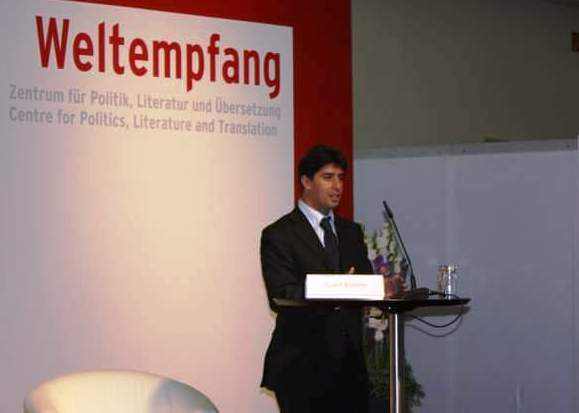
- Walid Soliman at the Frankfurt Book Fair
- Born: April 11, 1975 (age 51); Tunis, Tunisia
- Occupations: Writer and translator
- Writing career
- Movement: Postmodernism

Walid Soliman (born April 11, 1975) is a writer, essayist, and translator, born in Tunis, Tunisia.

== Biography ==
Walid Soliman followed his secondary studies in the "Sadikia" (secondary school founded in 1875). After his university studies in English language and literature, he obtained a degree in translation from the Institut Supérieur des Langues (University of Tunis I).

Besides his translations into Arabic, Walid Soliman has translated several Tunisian poets into French and English.

Furthermore, Walid Soliman is ex-president of the ATPCC (Tunisian Association for the Promotion of Cinema Criticism), and he has contributed to multiple magazines and newspapers in Tunisia and elsewhere(Al-Quds, Akhbar Al-Adab, Jeune Afrique, etc.).

He is currently editor-in-chief of the cultural online magazine Dedalus.

== Publications ==
- Le Troubadour des Temps Modernes (2004)
- Les Griffes des Eaux (2005)
- Saat Einstein al-akhira (Einstein's Last Hour), short stories collection (2008)
- Eros in the Novel, translation (2009)
- The Journey of the Blind, translation, Poetica Collection, (2009)
- Kawabis mariah (Merry Nighmares), short stories collection (2016)
