= Ali Douagi =

Tunisian writer and artist (1909–1949)

- علي الدوعاجي
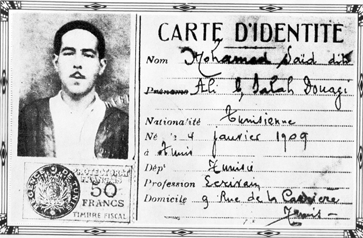
- Douagi's identity card
- Born: Ali ben Salah Douagi; January 4, 1909; Tunis, French protectorate of Tunisia
- Died: May 27, 1949 (aged 40); Tunis, French protectorate of Tunisia
- Occupations: Sketch artist; songwriter; playwright; journalist

Ali ben Salah Douagi (or ed-Du'aji; Arabic: علي بن صالح الدوعاجي, romanized: ʿAlī bin Ṣāliḥ ad-Dūʿājī; January 4, 1909 – May 27, 1949) was a Tunisian literary and cultural icon who is considered to be one of the pioneers of modern Tunisian literature. He is best remembered as "the father of the modern Tunisian short story". Douagi was also known for his versatility as a sketch artist, songwriter, playwright, and journalist.

== Biography ==
Douagi was born to a wealthy family of Turkish origin in the city of Tunis in 1909. His father, Hajj Muhammad ed-Du'aji, who was a wealthy merchant and landowner, died when Douagi was four years old; he bequeathed to his wife and children a sizeable trust fund from which the family was able to live comfortably. His mother, Nuzhat Bint Shaqshuq, gave birth to three daughters and two sons, Douagi being the only survivor of the two sons. Thus, growing up without his father and being the only son, in part, explains why his works had come to be heavily populated by women characters. Douagi received his primary education in a neighbourhood school where he learned both French and Arabic. Upon completing his primary education, Douagi enrolled in a local Quran school (kuttab) but soon discovered that this did not fulfill his interests. His mother encouraged him to pursue a career in business, and for a brief period he worked as an apprentice for a local successful merchant. However, Douagi decided to embark upon a project to educate himself by reading French literature and culture. When he made the acquaintance of Ali el-Jandubi, a prominent literary scholar, he discovered the medieval and modern Arabic history, literature and cultural studies.

When the colonial governments eased upon censorship in journalism in 1936, Douagi started up his own periodical, "es-Surur", though it only lasted a mere six weeks due to his lack of discipline. Nonetheless, Douagi came to be associated with a group of artists and intellectuals, known as the "Jma’a teht es-sur" ("The Beneath-the-Wall Group"), who congregated nightly in the cafes of the Bab Souika neighbourhood of the old madina in Tunisia to exchange ideas and argue politics. The group were committed to creating a modern Tunisian literature and culture that would denounce European colonialism and the cause of social justice and economic and social equality. Douagi was also experimental and especially known for his versatility as a sketch artist, songwriter, playwright, and short story writer.

His Turkish roots and his mastery of the French language, as well as his bourgeois background and financial security, all played a part in crafting a vision of himself and his work. Douagi often depicted and fantasised romanticised strokes of eastern-western encounters. Hence, his stories depicted a peaceful coexistence in which differing cultures and religions coexist; this philosophical stance regarding east–west encounters dominated from his earliest writings. A prominent figure that strongly influenced Douagi was Mahmud el-Bayram et-Tunsi (1893–1961);. the personal and professional relationship between them was one that embraced a vast spectrum of contemporary politics, arts, and ideological currents that electrified the cultural scene in Tunisia during the 1930s. They shared a passion for journalism, for the freedom of the press to lash out at social injustices, religious hypocrisy, and economic inequalities.

Douagi's most lasting contribution to Tunisian literature, as well as pan-Arabic literature, are his short stories that were collated and published in 1969, twenty years after his death, into a single anthology entitled "Shirtu minhu el-lyeli" ("Sleepless Nights, 2000"). On May 27, 1949, Douagi died of tuberculosis. According to many accounts, he was abandoned by many of his friends and harboured bitter disappointment for not being recognised for his work. However, on the tenth anniversary of his death, Zin el-Abidin es-Sanusi published an article entitle "Ed-Du’aji’s Legacy" which resurrected critical inquiry and public interest in his work. Al-Sanusi reported that Douagi had written in his 163 radio sketches, and that his heirs discovered 60 more among his affects. He also wrote 15 plays and composed nearly 500 songs and poems.

The Ali Douagi Prize (Prix Ali Douagi) for a novel is awarded at the Tunis International Book Festival (Foire internationale du Livre de Tunis). The Derja Association also awards an Ali Douagi Prize for the best work written in Tunisian Arabic ("derja"), in reference to Ali Douagi's use of vernacular in his plays and the dialogues of his short stories. This has caused confusion and some have criticized the Derja Association for choosing the same name as the more prominent prize.

== Selected works ==
- Shirtu minhu el-lyeli (Sleepless Nights)
- Jeri (My neighbour)
- Maotou El Am Békhir (The death of the Uncle Bekhir)
- Nozha Raïka (Luxurious walk)
- Omm Hawwa (Eve's Mother)

== Bibliography ==
- Granara, William (2010), "Ali al-Du'aji (1909–1949)", in Allen, Roger (ed.), Essays in Arabic Literary Biography: 1850-1950, Otto Harrassowitz Verlag, ISBN 978-3447061414.
- ad-Du‘aji, ‘Ali (2012) [1969], Mion, Giuliano (ed.), Notti in bianco سهرت منه الليالي (in Arabic and Italian), Milan: Hoepli, ISBN 9788820351212.
