= List of writers by name: H =

The following is a List of writers by name whose last names begin with H:

Abbreviations: ch = children's; d = drama, screenwriting; f = fiction; nf = non-fiction; p = poetry, song lyrics

== Ha ==
- Jacob Haafner (1754–1809, Germany/Netherlands, nf)
- Magnhild Haalke (1885–1984, Norway, f)
- Dorian Haarhoff (born 1944, S Africa/Namibia)
- Hella Haasse (1918–2011, Dutch East Indies/Netherlands, f/ch)
- Espen Haavardsholm (born 1945, Norway, f/p/nf)
- Jürgen Habermas (1929–2026, Germany, nf)
- Ahsan Habib (1917–1985, India/Bangladesh, p/f/ch)
- M. A. R. Habib (living, US, nf)
- Abdul Hai Habibi (1910–1984, Afghanistan, nf)
- Helon Habila (born 1967, Nigeria, f/p)
- Chékéba Hachemi (born 1974, Afghanistan, nf)
- Najat El Hachmi (born 1979, Morocco/Spain, f/nf)
- Maria Hack (1777–1844, England, nf/ch)
- Marilyn Hacker (born 1942, US, p/nf)
- Erich Hackl (born 1954, Austria, f)
- William Hacket (died 1591, England, nf)
- Friedrich Wilhelm Hackländer (1816–1877, Germany, f/nf)
- Peter Hacks (1928–2003, Germany, d/nf)
- David Hackworth (1930–2005, US, nf)
- Malek Haddad (1927–1978, Algeria, p/f/nf)
- Ali Haddani (1936–2007, Morocco, p)
- Mohammad Moustafa Haddara (1930–1997, Egypt, nf/f)
- Margaret Peterson Haddix (born 1964, US, ch)
- Mark Haddon (born 1962, England, f/p/d)
- Hadewijch (fl. 13th c., Duchy of Brabant, p/nf)
- Tessa Hadley (born 1956, England, f/nf)
- Lyndall Hadow (1903–1976, Australia, f/nf)
- Hadrawi (born 1943, Somaliland, p), full name Mohamed Ibrahim Warsame Hadrawi
- Ivana Hadži-Popović (born 1951, Yugoslavia/Serbia, f)
- Gabriele Haefs (born 1953, Germany, nf)
- Gisbert Haefs (born 1950, Germany, f)
- Stefan Haenni (born 1958, Switzerland, f)
- Hafez (1315–1390, Iran, p), pseudonym of Khwāja Shams-ud-Dīn Muḥammad Ḥāfeẓ-e Shīrāzī
- Yasser Abdel Hafez (born 1969, Egypt, f/nf)
- Bergljot Hobæk Haff (1925–2016, Norway, f)
- Sebastian Haffner (1907–1999, Germany, nf), pseudonym of Raimund Pretzel
- Einarr Hafliðason (1307–1393, Iceland, nf)
- Hannes Hafstein (1861–1922, Iceland, p)
- Stefán Jón Hafstein (born 1955, Iceland, nf)
- Guðmundur G. Hagalín (1898–1985, Iceland, nf)
- Hrafnhildur Hagalín (born 1965, Iceland, d)
- Carl August Hagberg (1810–1864, Sweden, nf)
- Friedrich von Hagedorn (1708–1754, Germany, p)
- Jessica Hagedorn (born 1949, Philippines/US, d/p)
- Ingeborg Refling Hagen (1895–1989, Norway, nf/p)
- Jean Hager (born 1932, US, f/ch)
- Mandy Hager (born 1960, N Zealand, f/ch/nf)
- Helge Hagerup (1933–2008, Norway, d/p/f)
- Inger Hagerup (1905–1985, Norway, d/p/nf)
- Klaus Hagerup (1946–2018, Norway, p/d/nf)
- H. Rider Haggard (1856–1925, England, f/nf)
- Lilias Rider Haggard (1892–1968, England, nf)
- Sakutarō Hagiwara (萩原朔太郎, 1886–1942, Japan, p)
- Emily Hahn (1905–1997, US, f/nf)
- Óscar Hahn (born 1938, Chile, f/nf/p)
- Hai Zi (海子, 1964–1989, China, p), pseudonym of Zha Haisheng (查海生)
- Qurratulain Haider (1927–2007, India, f/nf)
- Rashid Haider (1941–2020, India/Bangladesh, f)
- Matt Haig (born 1975, England, f/nf/ch)
- Arthur Hailey (1920–2004, UK/Canada, f)
- John Haines (1924–2011, US, p)
- Sarah Hainsworth (born 1967, England, nf)
- David Hair (living, N Zealand, f)
- Dragan Hajduković (born 1949, Yugoslavia/Montenegro, nf)
- Yusuf Has Hajib (c. 1019–1077, Kara Khanid Khanate, p/nf)
- Allal El Hajjam (born 1949, Morocco, p)
- Pavel Hak (born 1962, Czechoslovakia/France, f)
- Roya Hakakian (born 1966, Iran/US, p/nf)
- Abdul Hakim (c. 1620 – c. 1690, Portuguese E/Mughal E, p)
- Joy Hakim (born 1931, US, nf)
- Tawfiq al-Hakim (1898–1987, Egypt, f/d/nf)
- Grímur Hákonarson (born 1977, Iceland, d)
- Donald Hall (1928–2018, US, p/ch/nf)
- Sarah Hall (born 1974, England, f/p)
- Arthur Hallam (1811–1833, England, p)
- Thea Halo (born 1941, US, p/f/nf)
- Jack C. Haldeman II (1941–2002, US, f)
- Joe Haldeman (born 1943, US, f)
- John Hales (1584–1656, England, nf)
- Alex Haley (1921–1992, US, nf)
- Tunku Halim (born 1964, Malaysia, f/nf/ch)
- Gisèle Halimi (1927–2020, Tunisia/France, nf)
- Basil Hall (1788–1844, Scotland/England, nf)
- Bernadette Hall (born 1945, N Zealand, d/p)
- Megan Hall (born 1972, S Africa, p)
- Parnell Hall (1944–2020, US, f)
- Pip Hall (born 1971, N Zealand, d)
- Radclyffe Hall (1880–1943, England, p/f)
- Rodney Hall (born 1935, Australia, nf/p/f)
- Roger Hall (born 1939, N Zealand, d)
- Henry Hallam (1777–1859, England, nf)
- Hallar-Steinn (fl. c. 1200, Iceland, p)
- Halldórr skvaldri (fl. first half of 12th c., Iceland, p)
- Guðný Halldórsdóttir (born 1954, Iceland, d)
- Adam de la Halle (1240–1287, France, p)
- Albrecht von Haller (1708–1777, Switzerland, nf/p)
- Edmond Halley (1656–1742, England, nf)
- Hallfreðr vandræðaskáld (c. 965 – c. 1007, Iceland, p)
- Jónas Hallgrímsson (1807–1845, Iceland, p/nf)
- Tindr Hallkelsson (fl. c. 1000, Iceland, p)
- Friedrich Halm (1806–1871, Austria, d/p/f), pseudonym of Baron Eligius Franz Joseph von Münch-Bellinghausen
- Bruce Barrymore Halpenny (1937–2015, England, nf)
- Stefmerie Halstead (living, US, f)
- Leslie Halward (1905–1976, England, f/d)
- Rosalie Ham (born 1955, Australia, f/d)
- Boubou Hama (1906–1982, Niger, nf)
- Johann Georg Hamann (1730–1788, Germany, nf)
- Tatiana Hambro (born 1989, England, nf)
- Michael Hamburger (1924–2007, Germany/England)
- Barbara Hambly (born 1951, US, f/d)
- Joan Hambidge (born 1956, S Africa, p/nf)
- Mohammad Shafiq Hamdam (born 1981, Afghanistan, nf)
- Joan de Hamel (1924–2011, England/N Zealand, ch)
- Mohsin Hamid (born 1971, Pakistan/US, f/nf)
- Charles Hamilton (1876–1961, England, f/ch), pseudonym Frank Richards
- Edmond Hamilton (1904–1977, US, f)
- Elizabeth Hamilton (1756 or 1758–1816, Scotland, nf/p/f)
- Hervey Hamilton (1897–1985, England, f), pseudonym of Denise Robins
- José Ignacio García Hamilton (1943–2009, Argentina, nf)
- Lillias Hamilton (1858–1925, Australia/France, nf)
- Marguerite Hamilton (1920–1998, US, nf)
- Patrick Hamilton (1575–1658, Scotland, p)
- Patrick Hamilton (1904–1962, England, d/f)
- Peter F. Hamilton (born 1960, England, f)
- Virginia Hamilton (1936–2002, US, ch)
- Stefan Hammarén (born 1966, Finland, f/p)
- Beatrice Hammer (born 1963, France, f/ch)
- Joseph von Hammer-Purgstall (1774–1856, Austria, nf)
- Dashiell Hammett (1894–1961, US, f/d)
- Philip Hammial (born 1937, Australia, p)
- Henrietta Hardy Hammond (1854–1883, US, f)
- John Hampson (1901–1955, England, f), pseudonym of John Frederick Norman Hampson Simpson
- Susan Hampton (born 1949, Australia, p)
- Leif Hamre (1914–2007, Norway, ch)
- Þorsteinn frá Hamri (1938–2018, Iceland, f/p)
- Knut Hamsun (1859–1952, Norway, f/p/nf)
- Marie Hamsun (1881–1969, Norway, p/ch)
- Béla Hamvas (1897–1968, Hungary, nf)
- Han Dong (韩东, born 1961, China, nf/p/f)
- Han Fei (韓非, c. 280–233 BCE, China, nf)
- Han Han (韩寒, born 1982, China, f/nf)
- Han Shaogong (韓少功, born 1953, China, f)
- Han Su-yeong (born 1967, Korea, f)
- Han Suyin (周光瑚, 1916–2012, China/Switzerland)
- Han Yu (韓愈, 768–824, China, nf/p)
- Kiyoteru Hanada (花田清輝, 1909–1974, Japan, nf)
- Sherin Hanaey (living, Egypt, f/d)
- H. Irving Hancock (1868–1922, US, ch/nf)
- Peter Handke (born 1942, Austria, f/d/p)
- Khady Hane (born 1962, Senegal/France, f)
- Peter Handke (born 1942, Austria, f/d/p)
- Daniel Handler (born 1970, US, ch/f/d), pseudonym Lemony Snicket
- M. Jamil Hanifi (born 1935, Afghanistan, nf)
- Yutaka Haniya (埴谷雄高, 1909–1997, Japan, f)
- Tom Hanks (born 1956, US, f)
- James Hanley (1897–1985, England, f/d)
- Ryō Hanmura (半村良, 1933–2002, Japan, f)
- Kristin Hannah (born 1960, US, f)
- Sophie Hannah (born 1971, England, p/f)
- Lillemor von Hanno (1900–1984, Norway, f/d)
- Barbara Hanrahan (1939–1991, Australia, f/nf)
- Anita Hansemann (1962–2019, Switzerland, f/d/ch)
- Erik Fosnes Hansen (born 1965, Norway, f/p)
- Inger Elisabeth Hansen (born 1950, Norway, p)
- Joyce Hansen (born 1942, US, ch)
- Mark Victor Hansen (born 1948, US, f/nf)
- Maurits Hansen (1794–1842, Norway, f)
- Ron Hansen (born 1947, US, f/nf)
- Hanshan (寒山, fl. 9th c., China, p)
- Arvid Hanssen (1932–1998, Norway, p/f/ch)
- Bob Hansson (born 1970, Sweden, p)
- Bergtóra Hanusardóttir (born 1946, Faroe Is, f/nf)
- Ferdinand Hanusch (1866–1923, Austrian E, nf)
- Hao Jingfang (郝景芳, born 1984, China, f)
- Eberhard Werner Happel (1647–1690, Germany, f/nf)
- Chaudhry Afzal Haq (1891–1942, India, nf)
- Yahya Haqqi (1905–1992, Egypt, f/nf)
- Syed Shamsul Haque (1935–2016, India/Bangladesh, p/f/d)
- Hara Takashi (原敬, 1856–1921, Japan, nf)
- Tamiki Hara (原民喜, 1905–1951, Japan, nf/p)
- Ingibjörg Haraldsdóttir (1942–2016, Iceland, p)
- Nino Haratischwili (born 1983, USSR/Germany, f/d)
- Mohamed Harbi (1933–2026, Algeria, nf)
- Thea von Harbou (1888–1954, Germany, d/f)
- Michael Hardcastle (1933–2019, England, ch)
- Frances Hardinge (born 1973, England, ch)
- Ernst Hardt (1876–1947, Germany, d/p/f), pseudonym of Ernst Stöckhardt
- Thomas Hardy (1840–1928, England, f/p/d)
- Bjarni Harðarson (born 1961, Iceland, f)
- Ísak Harðarson (born 1956, Iceland, p/f/nf)
- John Hare (England/Nigeria, 1934–2022), pseudonym Dan Fulani
- Lesbia Harford (1891–1927, Australia, p/f)
- Roger Hargreaves (1935–1988, England, ch)
- Johann Hari (born 1979, Scotland/England, nf)
- John Harington (1560–1612, England, nf)
- Adolf von Harnack (1851–1930, Russian E/Germany, nf)
- Charles Harness (1915–2005, US, f)
- Cynthia Harnett (1893–1981, England, f/ch)
- Juan Damián López de Haro (1581–1648, Spain/Puerto Rico, nf/p)
- Beverley Harper (1943–2002, Australia/Botswana, f)
- Charles Harpur (1813–1868, Australia, p)
- Beatrice Harraden (1864–1936, England, nf)
- Yasser Harrak (living, Tangier/Canada, nf)
- Edward Harrington (1895–1966, Australia, p/f)
- James Harrington (1611–1677, England, nf)
- Alexandra Harris (born 1981, England, nf)
- Amanda Bartlett Harris (1824–1917, US, ch/nf)
- E. Lynn Harris (1955–2009, US, f)
- Ethel Hillyer Harris (1859–1931, US, f)
- Jane Elizabeth Harris (c. 1853–1942, N Zealand, nf)
- Joanne Harris (born 1964, England, f)
- Joel Chandler Harris (1848–1908, US, f/nf)
- Joseph Harris (Gomer) (1773–1825, Wales, p/nf)
- Max Harris (1921–1995, Australia, p/nf)
- Robert Harris (1951–1993, Australia, p)
- Robert Harris (born 1957, England, f)
- Rosemary Harris (1923–2019, England, ch)
- Sam Harris (born 1967, US, nf)
- Thomas Harris (born 1940, US, f)
- Tom Harris (1903–1983, England, nf)
- Wilson Harris (1921–2018, British Guiana/England, p/f/nf)
- Edith Ogden Harrison (1862–1955, US, ch)
- Elizabeth Harrison (1921–2008, England, f)
- Harry Harrison (1925–2012, US/England, f/nf)
- Jane Ellen Harrison (1850–1928, England, nf)
- Jennifer Harrison (born 1955, Australia, p)
- Jim Harrison (1937–2016, US, p/f/ch)
- Lisi Harrison (born 1970, Canada, ch/f)
- M. John Harrison (born 1945, England, f/nf)
- Martin Harrison (1949–2014, England/Australia, p)
- Sarah Harrison (born 1946, England, f/ch)
- Tony Harrison (1937–2025, England, p/d)
- Les Harrop (born 1948, England/Australia, p/nf)
- Elizabeth Harrower (1928–2020, f)
- J. S. Harry (1939–2015, Australia, p)
- Lou Harry (born 1963, US, nf/d)
- Carla Harryman (born 1952, US, p/nf/d)
- Georg Philipp Harsdörffer (1607–1658, Germany, p)
- David Harsent (born 1942, England, p/d/f)
- Johan Harstad (born 1979, Norway, f/d)
- Christopher Hart (born 1965, England, f/nf)
- Josephine Hart (1942–2011, Ireland/England, f/d)
- Kevin Hart (born 1954, Australia, p/nf)
- Maarten 't Hart (born 1944, Netherlands, f)
- Michael H. Hart (born 1932, US, nf)
- Paul Hartal (born 1936, Hungary/Canada, p/nf)
- Adam Hart-Davis (born 1943, England, nf)
- Alice Hart-Davis (born 1963, Wales/England, nf)
- Duff Hart-Davis (born 1936, England, nf/f)
- Rupert Hart-Davis (1907–1999, England, nf)
- Otto Erich Hartleben (1864–1905, Germany/Italy, p/d)
- Dorothy Hartley (1893–1985, England, nf)
- L. P. Hartley (1895–1972, England, f)
- Peter Härtling (1933–2017, Germany, f/nf/ch)
- Hartmann von Aue (c. 1160/1170 – c. 1210/1220, Germany, p)
- Moritz Hartmann (1821–1872, Austrian E/Germany, p)
- Petra Hartmann (born 1970, Germany, f)
- William K. Hartmann (born 1939, US, nf)
- Michael Hartnett (1941–1999, Ireland, p), Irish name Mícheál Ó hAirtnéide
- Sonya Hartnett (born 1968, Australia, f/ch)
- Phyllis Hartnoll (1906–1997, England, p/nf)
- Jan de Hartog (1914–2002, Netherlands/US, d/f/nf)
- William Hart-Smith (1911–1990, England/Australia, p/ch)
- Julia Hartwig (1921–2017, Poland, p/nf)
- Heather Joan Harvey (1899–1989, England, nf)
- Gwen Harwood (1920–1995, Australia, p), pseudonym of Gwendoline Nessie Foster
- Ali ibn Harzihim (559–1163, Morocco, nf)
- Hussein Hasan (1850s – 1910s, Somalia, p)
- Avdo Karabegović Hasanbegov (1878–1900, Austria-Hungary, nf)
- Sinan Hasani (1922–2010, Yugoslavia/Serbia, f)
- Bogdan Petriceicu Hasdeu (1838–1907, Russian E/Romania, nf)
- Kaitarō Hasegawa (長谷川海太郎, 1900–1935, Japan, f)
- Hasegawa Nyozekan (長谷川如是閑, 1875–1969, Japan, nf)
- Hasegawa Shigure (長谷川時雨, 1879–1941, Japan, d)
- Jaroslav Hašek (1883–1923, Austria-Hungary/Czechoslovakia, f/nf)
- Walter Hasenclever (1890–1940, Germany/France, p/d)
- Wilhelm Hasenclever (1837–1889, Germany, nf)
- Sugako Hashida (橋田壽賀子, 1925–2021, Japan, d), real name Sugako Iwasaki (岩﨑壽賀子)
- Dilara Hashem (1936–2022, India/Bangladesh, f)
- Shinkichi Hashimoto (橋本進吉, 1882–1945, Japan, nf)
- Alamgir Hashmi (born 1951, Pakistan/England, p)
- Ahmet Hâşim (c. 1884–1933, Ottoman E/Turkey)
- J. H. Haslam (1874–1969, N Zealand, p/nf)
- Eveline Hasler (born 1933, Switzerland, f/ch)
- Josef Haslinger (born 1955, Austria, f/nf)
- Nicholas Hasluck (born 1942, Australia, f/p)
- Ebba Haslund (1917–2009, Norway, f/d/ch)
- Robert Hass (born 1941, US, p/nf)
- Mohamed Hassaïne (1945–1994, Algeria, nf)
- Noordin Hassan (born 1929, Malaya/Malaysia, d)
- Zurinah Hassan (born 1949, Malaya/Malaysia, p/f)
- Henry Hasse (1913–1977, US, f)
- Jon Hassler (1932–2008, US, f)
- Libby Hathorn (born 1943, Australia, ch/p)
- John Hattendorf (born 1941, US, nf)
- Milton Hatoum (born 1952, Brazil, f)
- Ann Hatton (1764–1838, England/Wales, f)
- Joseph Hatton (1837–1907, England, f/nf)
- Ragnhild Hatton (1913-1995, Norway/England, nf)
- Wilhelm Hauff (1802–1827, Germany, p/f)
- Paal-Helge Haugen (born 1945, Norway, p/f/ch)
- Torill Thorstad Hauger (1943–2014, Norway, f/ch/nf)
- Gerhart Hauptmann (1862–1946, Germany/Poland, d/f)
- Georges Hausemer (1957–2018, Luxembourg, f/nf), pseudonym Theo Selmer
- Otto Hauser (1874–1932, Switzerland, nf)
- Albrecht Haushofer (1903–1945, Germany, nf)
- Marlen Haushofer (1920–1970, Austria, f/ch)
- Raoul Hausmann (1886–1971, Austria/France, p)
- Adolph Hausrath (1837–1909, Germany, nf), pseudonym George Taylor
- Havank (1904–1964, Netherlands, f/nf), pseudonym of Hendrikus Frederikus van der Kallen
- Juanita Havill (born 1949, US, ch)
- Dewi Havhesp (1831–1884, Wales, p), pseudonym of David Roberts
- Iosi Havilio (born 1974, Argentina, f)
- Hawad (born 1950, Niger/France, p), also Mahmoudan Hawad
- Charles Boardman Hawes (1889–1923, US, f/nf)
- Stephen Hawes (died 1523, England, p)
- Ethan Hawke (born 1970, US, f)
- Mary Elizabeth Hawker (1848–1908, Scotland/England, f), pseudonym Lanoe Falconer
- Peter Hawker (1786–1853, England, nf)
- Robert Hawker (1803–1875, England, p/nf)
- Jane Hawking (born 1944, England, nf)
- Stephen Hawking (1942–2018, England, nf)
- Desmond Hawkins (1908–1999, England, nf/d)
- Gerald Hawkins (1928–2003, England/US, nf)
- Karen Hawkins (living, US, f)
- Kathleen Hawkins (1883–1981, N Zealand, p)
- Paula Hawkins (born 1972, Rhodesia/England, f)
- William Hawkins (1722–1801, England, p/d)
- Noah Hawley (born c. 1967, US, f/d)
- Julian Hawthorne (1846–1934, US, p/f/nf)
- Nathaniel Hawthorne (1804–1864, US, f)
- Nigel Hawthorne (1929–2001, S Africa/England, nf)
- Susan Hawthorne (born 1951, Australia, nf/p/f)
- Faraj Hawwar (born 1954, Tunisia, f/nf)
- Catherine Hay (1910–1995, N Zealand, f)
- Deltina Hay (born 1960, US, nf)
- George Campbell Hay (1915–1984, Scotland, p)
- Gilbert Hay (c. 1403 – post-1456, Scotland, p)
- Gyula Háy (1900–1975, Hungary, nf/d), pseudonym Stefan Faber
- Karyn Hay (born 1959, N Zealand, f)
- Yoshiki Hayama (葉山嘉樹, 1894–1945, Japan, f)
- Yuji Hayami (早見裕司, born 1961, Japan, f)
- Fumiko Hayashi (林芙美子, 1903 or 1904–1951, Japan, f/p)
- Fusao Hayashi (林房雄, 1903–1975, Japan, nf)
- Robert Hayden (1913–1980, US, p/nf)
- Myfanwy Haycock (1913–1963, Wales/England, p)
- Ernest Haycox (1899–1950, US, f)
- Jon Haylett (living, Tanganyika/Scotland, f)
- William Hayley (1745–1820, England, nf)
- Carole Hayman (living, England, f/d)
- Robert Hayman (1575–1629, England/Newfoundland, p)
- Sylvia Haymon (1918–1995, England, nf/f)
- Natalie Haynes (born 1974, England, d/f/ch)
- Tony Haynes (born 1960, US, p/ch)
- Mary Hays (1759–1843, England, nf/p/f)
- Le Ly Hayslip (born 1949, Vietnam/US,), born Phùng Thị Lệ Lý
- Nikolay Haytov (1919–2002, Bulgaria, f/d/nf)
- Joel Hayward (born 1964, N Zealand, f/nf/p)
- Carolyn Haywood (1898–1990, US, ch)
- Eliza Haywood (c. 1693–1756, England, f/d/p)
- Helen Haywood (1907–1995, England, ch)
- Barbara Haworth-Attard (born 1953, Canada, ch)
- Attila Hazai (1967–2012, Hungary, f)
- Sudhir Hazareesingh (born 1961, England/Mauritius, nf)
- Flore Hazoumé (born 1959, Republic of the Congo/Ivory Coast, f/ch)
- Paul Hazoumé (1890–1980, Benin, f/nf)
- William Hazlitt (1778–1830, England, nf/d)
- William Carew Hazlitt (1834–1913, England, nf)
- Paul Hazoumé (1890–1980, Benin, nf/f)
- Shirley Hazzard (1931–2016, Australia/US, f/nf)

== He ==
- He Changling (賀長齡, 1785–1848, China, nf)
- He Qinglian (何清漣, born 1956, China, nf)
- He Zhizhang (賀知章, c. 659–744, China, p/nf)
- Bessie Head (1937–1986, S Africa/Botswana, f/nf)
- Tim Heald (1944–2016, England, nf/f)
- Seamus Heaney (1939–2013, Ireland, p/d)
- John Hearne (1926–1994, Jamaica, f/nf)
- James Hearst (1900–1983, US, p/nf)
- Helen Heath (born 1970, N Zealand, p)
- Roy Heath (1926–2008, British Guiana/England, f)
- John Heath-Stubbs (1918–2006, England, p)
- Constance Heaven (1911–1995, England, f), pseudonym of Constance Fecher Heaven
- Christian Friedrich Hebbel (1813–1863, Germany/Austria, p/d)
- Johann Peter Hebel (1760–1826, Germany, f/p/nf)
- Reginald Heber (1783–1826, England, nf/p)
- Anne Hébert (1916–2000, Canada, f/p)
- James Hebblethwaite (1857–1921, England/Australia, p/n)
- Peter Hebblethwaite (1930–1994, England, nf)
- Fethia Hechmi (born 1955, Tunisia, f/p/nf)
- Victor Heck (born 1967, US, f/d)
- Reza-Qoli Khan Hedayat (1800–1871, Persia, nf/p)
- Sadegh Hedayat (1903–1951, Iran/France, f/d/nf)
- Carol Hedges (living, England, f/ch)
- Markus Hediger (born 1959, Switzerland, p/nf)
- Friedrich Heer (1916–1983, Austria, nf)
- Etienne van Heerden (born 1954, S Africa, f/p/d)
- Simon Heere Heeresma (1932–2011, Netherlands, f/p)
- Rebecca Heflin (born 1963, US, f), pseudonym of Barbara Dianne Farb
- Simon Heffer (born 1960, England, nf)
- Georg Wilhelm Friedrich Hegel (1770–1831, Germany, nf)
- Hegemon of Thasos (fl. 5th c. BCE, Greece, d)
- Johannes Heggland (1919–2008, Norway, f/ch/d)
- Gunnar Heiberg (1857–1929, Norway, p/d/nf)
- Florence Parry Heide (1919–2011, US, ch)
- Martin Heidegger (1889–1976, Germany, nf)
- Verner von Heidenstam (1859–1940, Sweden, p/f)
- Bernard Heidsieck (1928–2014, France, p)
- A. F. Th. van der Heijden (born 1951, Netherlands, f)
- Herman Heijermans (1864–1924, Netherlands, f/d), pseudonym Samuel Falkland
- Mohammed Hussein Heikal (1888–1956, Egypt, nf/f)
- Seppo Heikinheimo (1938–1997, Finland, nf)
- Moe Hein (1942–2010, Burma/Myanmar, nf/p)
- Heinrich Heine (1797–1856, Germany/France, p/nf)
- Helme Heine (1941–2025, Germany/N Zealand, ch/d)
- William Heinesen (1900–1991, Faroe Is, p/f/ch)
- Robert A. Heinlein (1907–1988, US, f)
- Heinrich von Morungen (died c. 1220/1222, Germany, p)
- Heinrich von Veldeke (c. 1150 – post-1184, Flanders, p/nf)
- Willi Heinrich (1920–2005, Germany, f)
- Anita Heiss (born 1968, Australia, nf/ch/p)
- Helmut Heißenbüttel (1921–1996, Germany, f/p)
- Arash Hejazi (born 1971, Iran, nf/f)
- Lyn Hejinian (born 1941, US, p/nf)
- Lin Van Hek (born 1944, Australia, p/f/nf), born Lyn Van Hecke
- Etelka Kenéz Heka (born 1936, Yugoslavia/Hungary, p/f/nf)
- Liliana Heker (born 1943, Argentina, nf)
- Kurt Held (1897–1959, Germany/Switzerland, f/p), pseudonym Kurt Held
- Herberto Hélder (1930–2015, Portugal, p)
- Einarr Helgason (fl. 10th c., Iceland, p)
- Hallgrímur Helgason (born 1959, Iceland, f/nf)
- Jón Helgason (1899–1986, Iceland, nf/p)
- Þórður Helgason (born 1947, Iceland, nf)
- Joseph Heller (1923–1999, US, f/d)
- Meshullam Feivush Heller (c. 1742–1794, Spain, nf)
- Cat Hellisen (born 1977, S Africa, f)
- Jill Hellyer (1925–2011, Australia, p/f/nf)
- Guy Helminger (born 1963, Luxembourg, f/d)
- Nico Helminger (born 1953, Luxembourg, p/f/d)
- Guðrið Helmsdal (born 1941, Faroe Is, p)
- Rakel Helmsdal (born 1966, Faroe Is, f/ch/d)
- Liv Heløe (born 1963, Norway, d)
- George Helon (born 1965, England/Australia, p/nf)
- Mark Helprin (born 1947, US, f/nf)
- Racey Helps (1913–1970, England, ch)
- Gáspár Heltai (c. 1490–1574, Hungary/Transylvania, nf)
- Felicia Hemans (1793–1835, Wales/Ireland, p)
- Kris Hemensley (born 1946, Australia, p)
- Ernest Hemingway (1899–1961, US, f/nf)
- Alexander Henderson (c. 1583–1646, Scotland, nf)
- Christina Henderson (1861–1953, N Zealand, nf)
- Ebenezer Henderson (1809–1879, Scotland, nf)
- Zenna Henderson (1917–1983, US, f)
- Tony Hendra (1941–2021, England/US, nf)
- Georges Henein (1914–1973, Egypt/France, p/nf)
- Thomas William Heney (1862–1928, Australia, nf/f/p)
- Shirl Henke (born 1942, US, f)
- Virginia Henley (born 1935, England, f)
- William Ernest Henley (1849–1903, England, p)
- Sass Henno (born 1982, USSR/Estonia, f)
- Levi Henriksen (born 1964, Norway, f/p)
- Vera Henriksen (1927–2016, Norway, f/d/nf)
- Alf Henrikson (1905–1995, Sweden, nf/p)
- Henry of Huntingdon (c. 1088 – c. 1157, England, nf)
- Marguerite Henry (1902–1997, US, ch)
- O. Henry (1862–1910, US, f)
- Robert Henryson (c. 1460–1500, Scotland, p)
- Luise Hensel (1798–1876, Germany, p)
- Philip Hensher (born 1965, England, f/nf)
- G. A. Henty (1832–1902, England, f)
- Anne Hepple (1877–1959, England, f), pseudonym of Anne Hepple Dickinson
- Heraclitus (c. 535 – c. 475 BCE, Greece, nf)
- A. P. Herbert (1890–1971, England, f/d)
- Agnes Herbert (late 1870s – 1960, Isle of Man, nf)
- Frank Herbert (1920–1986, US, f/nf)
- George Herbert (1593–1633, England, p/nf)
- William Herbert (1778–1847, England, nf/p)
- Hans Herbjørnsrud (1938–2023, Norway, f)
- Dag Herbjørnsrud (born 1971, Norway, nf)
- Manu Herbstein (born 1936, S Africa, f)
- Wilhelm Herchenbach (1818–1889, Germany, f/ch)
- Alexandre Herculano (1910–1977, Portugal, f/nf)
- Ferenc Herczeg (1863–1964, Hungary, d/f)
- Johann Gottfried von Herder (1744–1803, Germany, nf/p)
- José-Maria de Heredia (1842–1905, Cuba/France, p)
- Hergé (1907–1983, Belgium, ch)
- Íeda Herman (1925–2019, Iceland/US, nf)
- Judith Hermann (born 1970, Germany, f)
- Willem Frederik Hermans (1921–1995, Netherlands, p/f/nf)
- Marie Hermanson (born 1956, Sweden, f)
- François Tristan l'Hermite (c. 1601–1665, France, d)
- Stephan Hermlin (1915–1997, Germany, f/nf/p)
- Gyula Hernádi (1926–2005, Hungary, d/f)
- Amado V. Hernandez (1903–1970, Philippines, f/p/nf)
- José Hernández (1834–1886, Argentina, nf/p)
- Miguel Hernández (1910–1942, Spain, p/d)
- Herodotus (c. 484 – c. 425 BCE, Persian E/Greece, nf)
- Antoine Héroet (died 1568, France, p)
- Don Herold (1889–1966, US, nf)
- Robert Heron (1764–1807, Scotland, nf)
- Franz Herre (1926–2026, Germany, nf)
- Juan Felipe Herrera (born 1948, US, p/nf/ch)
- Francis Hobart Herrick (1858–1940, US, nf)
- James A. Herrick (born 1954, US, nf)
- Jim Herrick (born 1944, England, nf)
- Robert Herrick) (1591–1674, England, p)
- Sophia Bledsoe Herrick (1837–1919, US, nf)
- Steven Herrick (born 1958, Australia, p/ch)
- James Herriot (1916–1995, England, f), pseudonym of James Alfred Wight
- Richard Herrmann (1919–2010, Norway, nf)
- Jeanne Hersch (1910–2000, Switzerland, nf)
- John Herschel (1792–1871, England, nf)
- Noreena Hertz (born 1967, England, nf)
- Solange Hertz (1920–2015, US, nf)
- James Hervey (1714–1758, England, nf)
- Thomas Kibble Hervey (1799–1859, Scotland/England, p/nf)
- Georg Herwegh (1817–1875, Germany, p)
- Theodor Herzl (1860–1904, Austria/Hungary, nf/d)
- Wilhelm Herzog (1884–1960, Germany, nf)
- Vladimir Herzog (1937–1975, Brazil, nf/d)
- Miguel Hesayne (1922–2019, Argentina, nf)
- Annabel Heseltine (born 1963, England, nf)
- Hesiod (fl. c. 750–650 BCE, Greece, p)
- Phoebe Hesketh (1909–2005, England, p)
- Harold Heslop (1898–1983, England, f)
- Hermann Hesse (1877–1962, Germany, f/p)
- Karen Hesse (born 1952, US, ch)
- Stéphane Hessel (1917–2013, Germany/France, nf)
- Helius Eobanus Hessus (1488–1540, Germany, p/nf)
- Paul Hetherington (born 1958, Australia, p)
- Olivia Hetreed (born 1960, England, d)
- Cor van den Heuvel (born 1931, US, p)
- Juliette Heuzey (1865–1952, France), f/nf
- Dag Heward-Mills (born 1963, England/Ghana, nf)
- Dorothy Hewett (1923–2002, Australia, p/f/d)
- Ellen Hewett (1843–1926, N Zealand, nf)
- Maurice Hewlett (1861–1923, England, f/p/nf)
- David Hewson (born 1953, England, f)
- Christopher Heydon (1561–1623, England, nf)
- John Heydon (1629 – c. 1667, England, nf)
- Georgette Heyer (1902–1974, England, f)
- Peter Heylyn (1599–1652, England, nf)
- Georg Heym (1887–1912, Germany, p/d)
- Stefan Heym (1913–2001, Germany, f/nf), pseudonym of Helmut Flieg
- Éva Heyman (1931–1944, Hungary, nf), child Holocaust victim
- Paul Heyse (1830–1914, Germany, f/d)

== Hi–Hn ==
- Carl Hiaasen (born 1953, US, f/ch)
- Brenda Hiatt (living, US, f/ch)
- Christopher Hibbert (1924–2008, England, nf)
- Eleanor Alice Hibbert (1906–1993, England, f)
- Robert Hichens (1864–1950, England, f/nf/d)
- Mary St Domitille Hickey (1882–1958, N Zealand, nf)
- Clifford B. Hicks (1920–2010, US, ch)
- Molly Hide (1913–1995, England,)
- Andrej Hieng (1925–2000, Yugoslavia/Slovenia, f/d)
- Keigo Higashino (東野圭吾, born 1958, Japan, f)
- Dick Higgins (1938–1998, England/US, p/nf)
- Jack Higgins (1929–2022, England, f), pseudonym of Henry Patterson
- Kristan Higgins (living, US, f)
- Sarah Higgins (1830–1923, N Zealand, nf)
- Philip E. High (1914–2006, England, f)
- Charles Higham (1931–2012, England/US, nf)
- Patricia Highsmith (1921–1995, US/Switzerland, f)
- Scott Hightower (born 1952, US, p/nf)
- Ichiyō Higuchi (樋口一葉, 1872–1896, Japan, f), pseudonym of Natsu Higuchi (樋口奈津)
- Naseem Hijazi (1914–1996, India/Pakistan, f)
- Nâzım Hikmet (1902–1963, Ottoman E/Turkey, p/d/f)
- Wolfgang Hilbig (1941–2007, Germany, f/p)
- Hildebrand (1814–1903, Netherlands), pseudonym of Nicolaas Beets
- Wolfgang Hildesheimer (1916–1991, Germany/Switzerland, p/nf)
- E. W. Hildick (1925–2001, England, ch)
- Richard Hildreth (1807–1865, US, nf)
- James Hildyard (1809–1887, England, nf)
- Fiona Hile (living, Australia, p/f/nf)
- Barry Hill (born 1943, nf/p)
- David Hill (born 1942, N Zealand, f/ch)
- Douglas Hill (1935–2007, Canada, f)
- Ernestine Hill (1899–1972, Australia, nf/f/d)
- Eva Hill (1898–1981, N Zealand, nf)
- Geoffrey Hill (1932–2016, England, p/nf)
- Grace Livingston Hill (1865–1947, US, f)
- Joe Hill (born 1972, US, f/p)
- Justin Hill (born 1971, Bahamas/Hong Kong, f)
- Lorna Hill (1902–1991, England, ch)
- Napoleon Hill (1883–1970, US, nf)
- Reginald Hill (1936–2012, England, f)
- Selima Hill (born 1945, England, p)
- Susan Hill (born 1942, England, f/nf)
- Tobias Hill (born 1970, England, p/nf/f)
- Rut Hillarp (1914–2003, Sweden, p/f)
- Richard Hillary (1919–1943, Australia/Scotland, nf)
- Kurt Hiller (1885–1972, Germany, nf)
- Tony Hillerman (1925–2008, US, f/nf)
- Etty Hillesum (1914–1943, Netherlands, nf), Holocaust victim
- Richard Hillman (born 1964, Australia, p)
- Hilda Hilst (1930–2004, Brazil, p/f/d)
- James Hilton (1900–1954, f/d)
- John Buxton Hilton (1921–1986, England, f)
- Paris Hilton (born 1981, US, nf)
- Walter Hilton (c. 1340/1345–1396, England, nf)
- Chester Himes (1909–1984, US/Spain, f)
- Bensalem Himmich (born 1948, Morocco, f/p/nf)
- Saeko Himuro (氷室冴子, 1957–2008, Japan, f/nf/d)
- Kōnosuke Hinatsu (日夏耿之介, 1890–1971, Japan, p), pseudonym of Kunito Higuchi
- Thomas Hinde (1926–2014, England, f/nf)
- Joanna Hines (living, England, f/nf)
- Francis Charles Hingeston-Randolph (1833–1910, England, nf), born Francis Hingston
- Ashihei Hino (火野葦平, 1907–1960, Japan, f)
- Hinrek van Alckmer (fl. 15th c., Netherlands, f)
- Ellen Hinsey (born 1960, US, nf)
- Nigel Hinton (born 1941, England, ch)
- S. E. Hinton (born 1948, US, ch)
- Christopher Hinz (born 1951, US, f)
- Theodor Gottlieb von Hippel the Elder (1741–1796, Germany, nf)
- Hippocrates (c. 460 – c. 370 BCE, Greece, nf)
- Hipponax (fl. late 6th c. BCE, Ephesus, p)
- Taiko Hirabayashi (平林たい子, 1905–1972, Japan, nf/f)
- Hiraide Shū (平出修, 1878–1914, Japan, f/p)
- Yumie Hiraiwa (平岩弓枝, 1932–2023, Japan, f)
- Andrea Hirata (born 1967, Indonesia, f)
- Hirato Renkichi (平戸廉吉, 1893–1822m Japan, p/nf)
- Kazuo Hirotsu (広津和郎, 1891–1968, Japan, f/nf)
- Hirotsu Ryurō (広津柳浪, 1861–1928, Japan, f), pseudonym of Hirotsu Naoto
- Rozalie Hirs (born 1965, Netherlands, p)
- Afua Hirsch (born 1981, Norway/England, nf)
- Jane Hirshfield (born 1953, US, p/nf)
- Obo Aba Hisanjani (born 1949, Nigeria, p)
- Juran Hisao (久生十蘭, 1902–1957, Japan, f), pseudonym of Masao Abe (阿部正雄)
- Jane Hissey (born 1952, England, ch)
- George Hitchcock (1914–2010, US, p/d/nf)
- Lydia Hitchcock (1946–2011, US/England, n), pseudonym of Penny Jordan
- Christopher Hitchens (1949–2011, England/US, nf)
- H. L. Hix (born 1960, US, p/nf)
- Jón Oddsson Hjaltalín (1749–1835, Iceland, p/nf)
- Þórvaldr Hjaltason (fl. late 10th c., Iceland, p)
- Hera Hjartardóttir (born 1983, Iceland/N Zealand, p)
- Snorri Hjartarson (1906–1986, Iceland, p)
- Vigdis Hjorth (born 1959, Norway, f)
- Ludu U Hla (1910–1982, Burma, nf)
- Pho Hlaing (1830–1883, Burma, nf)
- Thakin Kodaw Hmaing (1876–1964, Burma, p/f/d)
- Olvir Hnufa (fl. late 9th – early 10th c., Iceland, p)

== Ho–Hr ==
- Ho Fuk Yan (何福仁, living, Hong Kong, nf/p)
- Benjamin Hoadly (1676–1761, England, nf)
- Tami Hoag (born 1959, US, f)
- Pham Thi Hoai (born 1960, Vietnam/Germany, f/nf)
- Louisa Gurney Hoare (1784–1836, England, nf)
- Mike Hoare (1919–2020, India/S Africa, nf)
- Russell Hoban (1925–2011, US/England, f/p/ch)
- Ion Hobana (1931–2011, Romania, f/nf), pseudonym of Aurelian Manta Roşie
- Thomas Hobbes (1588–1679, England, nf)
- Pam Hobbs (born 1929/1930, England/Canada, nf)
- Will Hobbs (born 1974, US, ch)
- Hermione Hobhouse (1934–2014, England, nf)
- John Hobhouse, 1st Baron Broughton (1786–1869, England, nf)
- Eric Hobsbawm (1917–2012, Egypt/England, nf)
- Lady Margaret Hoby (1571–1633, England, nf)
- Thomas Hoccleve (1368–1426, England, p)
- Zoran Hočevar (born 1944, Yugoslavia/Slovenia, f/d)
- Rolf Hochhuth (1931–2020, Germany, d/f)
- Fritz Hochwälder (1911–1986, Austria, d)
- Mary Hocking (1921–2014, England, f)
- Emmanuel Hocquard (1940–2019, France, p/nf/f)
- Jakob van Hoddis (1887–1942, Germany, p), pseudonym of Hans Davidsohn
- Jane Aiken Hodge (1917–2009, US/England, f/nf)
- Merle Hodge (born 1944, Trinidad, f/nf)
- Philip Hodgins (1959–1995, Australia, p)
- Dorothy Hodgkin (1910–1994, Egypt/England, nf)
- Helen Hodgman (born 1946, Scotland/Australia, f)
- W. N. Hodgson (1893–1916, England/France, p), pseudonym Edward Melbourne
- William Ballantyne Hodgson (1815–1880, Scotland, nf)
- Tone Hødnebø (born 1962, Norway, p)
- Michal Miloslav Hodža (1811–1870, Austria-Hungary, nf/p)
- Peter Høeg (born 1957, Denmark, f)
- Sigurd Hoel (1890–1960, Norway, f)
- Tore Elias Hoel (born 1953, Norway, p/f/ch)
- Edvard Hoem (born 1949, Norway, f/d)
- Michael Hoeye (born 1947, US, ch)
- Abbie Hoffman (1936–1989, US, nf)
- Mary Hoffman (born 1945, England, ch)
- August Heinrich Hoffmann von Fallersleben (1798–1874, Germany)
- E. T. A. Hoffmann (1776–1822, Germany, f/nf)
- Heinrich Hoffmann (1809–1894, Germany, p/ch)
- Barbara Hofland (1770–1844, England, ch)
- Wim Hofman (born 1941, Netherlands, f)
- Albert Hofmann (1906–2008, Switzerland, nf)
- Gert Hofmann (1931–1993, Germany, d/f)
- Michael Hofmann (born 1957, Germany/US, p)
- Hugo von Hofmannsthal (1874–1929, Austria, f/d/p)
- Gunvor Hofmo (1921–1995, Norway, p)
- James P. Hogan (1941–2010, England/Ireland, f)
- Shanna Hogan (1982–2020, US, nf)
- James Hogg (1770–1835, Scotland, p/f/nf)
- Sarah Hogg, Viscountess Hailsham (born 1946, England, nf)
- Thomas Jefferson Hogg (1792–1862, England, nf/f)
- Robert Hohlbaum (1886–1955, Austrian E/Germany, f/nf)
- Franz Hohler (born 1943, Switzerland, f)
- Hideji Hōjō (北条秀司, 1902–1996, Japan, f/d)
- Odd Hølaas (1898–1968, Norway, nf)
- Anton Holban (1902–1937, Romania, f/nf)
- Ludvig Holberg (1684–1754, Norway, p/f/nf)
- Zita Holbourne (born 1960s, England, nf)
- David Holbrook (1923–2011, England, f/p/nf)
- Jasmina Holbus (born 1968, Yugoslavia/Serbia, p)
- M. H. Holcroft (1902–1993, N Zealand, nf/f)
- Thomas Holcroft (1745–1809, England, d/nf/p)
- Hubert Ashton Holden (1822–1896, England, nf)
- Wendy Holden (born 1961, England, f/nf)
- Wendy Holden, (born 1965, England, f)
- Friedrich Hölderlin (1770–1843, Germany, p/nf)
- Elizabeth Sanxay Holding (1889–1955, US, f)
- Robert Holdstock (1948–2009, England, f)
- Ethel Carnie Holdsworth (1886–1962, England, p/f/ch)
- Margaret Holford (the elder) (1757–1784, England, f/d/p)
- Margaret Holford (1778–1852, England, p)
- Abraham Holland (died 1626, England/Isle of Man, p)
- Barbara Holland (1933–2010, US, nf)
- Jane Holland (born 1966, England, p/f/nf)
- Norah M. Holland (1876–1925, Canada, p/f/nf)
- Patrick Holland (born 1977, Australia, f)
- Sarah Holland (born 1961, England/Scotland, n)
- Tom Holland (born 1968, nf)
- Charlotte Lamb (1937–2000, England/Isle of Man, f)
- Sarah Holland-Batt (born 1982, Australia, p/nf)
- John Hollander (1929–2013, US, p/nf)
- Alan Hollinghurst (born 1954, England, f/p)
- Matthew Hollis (born 1971, England, p)
- Ada Augusta Holman (1869–1949, Australia, nf/f/ch)
- Eduardo Ladislao Holmberg (1852–1937, Argentina, nf/f)
- Timothy Holme (1928–1987, England/Italy, nf/f)
- Janet Holmes (born 1947, N Zealand, nf)
- Oliver Wendell Holmes Sr. (1809–1894, US, p/nf)
- Richard Holmes (born 1945, England, nf)
- Victoria Holmes (living, England, f)
- Egil Holmsen (1917–1990, Sweden, d/f)
- Sverre Holmsen (1906–1992, S Africa/Sweden, nf)
- Sara Holmsten (1713–1795), Sweden
- Michael Holroyd (born 1935, England, nf)
- Adriaan Roland Holst (1888–1976, Netherlands, p)
- Henriette Roland Holst (1869–1952, Netherlands, p/nf)
- Imogen Holst (1907–1984, England, nf)
- Anne Holt (born 1958, Norway, f)
- Frank L. Holt (living, US, nf)
- Hazel Holt (1928–2015, England, f)
- Kåre Holt (1916–1997, Norway, ch/f/nf)
- Nathalia Holt (born 1980, US, nf)
- Tom Holt (born 1961, England, f)
- Victoria Holt (1906–1993, England, f), pseudonym of Eleanor Burford Hibbert
- William Holt (1897–1977, England, nf/f)
- Winifred Holtby (1898–1935, England, f/nf)
- Karl von Holtei (1798–1880, Germany, p)
- Åsta Holth (1904–1999, Norway, f/p)
- Hans Egon Holthusen (1913–1997, Germany, p/nf)
- Ludwig Christoph Heinrich Hölty (1748–1776, Germany, p)
- William Holwell (1726–1798, England, nf)
- George Holyoake (1817–1906, England, nf)
- Arno Holz (1863–1929, Germany, p/d)
- Stewart Home (born 1962, England, f/nf)
- Homer (early 9th – late 8th c. BCE, Greece, p)
- Annie Homer (1882–1953, England, nf)
- Ee Tiang Hong (1933–1990, Malaya/Australia, p)
- Hong Liangji (洪亮吉, 1746–1809, China, nf)
- Hong Zicheng (洪自誠, fl. 1572–1620, China, nf), pseudonym Huanchu Daoren (還初道人)
- Hong Ying (虹影, born 1962, China, p/f)
- Barbara Honigmann (born 1949, Germany, f)
- Axel Honneth (born 1949, Germany/US, nf)
- Christophe Honoré (born 1970, France, ch/f)
- Luis Bernardo Honwana (born 1942, Mozambique, f)
- Lynley Hood (born 1942, N Zealand, nf)
- Thomas Hood (1799–1845, England, p/f)
- Tom Hood (1835–1874, England, nf/p)
- Pieter Corneliszoon Hooft (1581–1647, Netherlands, nf/p/d)
- Theodore Hook (1788–1841, England, f/nf)
- Hilda Mary Hooke (1898–1978, Canada, p/d)
- Robert Hooke (1635–1703, England, nf)
- Richard Hooker (1554–1600, England, nf)
- Thomas Hooker (1586–1647, England/US, nf)
- John Hoole (1727–1803, England, nf/d)
- Ed Hooper (born 1964, US, nf)
- John Hooper (c. 1495–1555, England, nf)
- Kay Hooper (born 1958, US, f)
- Peyman Hooshmandzadeh (born 1969, Iran, f/nf)
- Isaac Daniel Hooson (1880–1948, Wales, p)
- Charles Hooton (1810–1847, England, f/nf)
- Harry Hooton (1908–1961, Australia, p/nf)
- A. D. Hope (1907–2000, Australia, p/nf)
- Alexander Beresford Hope (1820–1887, England, nf)
- Anthony Hope (1863–1933, England, f/d)
- Christopher Hope (born 1944, S Africa, f/p)
- Henry Thomas Hope (1808–1862, England, nf)
- Thomas Hope (1769–1831, England, f)
- Hans Hopfen (1835–1904, Germany, p/f)
- Ellice Hopkins (1836–1904, England, nf/p)
- Gerard Manley Hopkins (1844–1889, England/Ireland, p)
- William Hopkins (1793–1866, England, nf)
- Nalo Hopkinson (born 1960, Jamaica/Canada, f)
- John Hoppner (1858–1910, England, nf/p)
- Mererid Hopwood (born 1964, Wales, p)
- Anisul Hoque (born 1965, Bangladesh, f/nf/d)
- Horace (65–8 BCE, Rome, p), Anglicization of Quintus Horatius Flaccus
- Paul Horgan (1903–1995, US, f/nf)
- Akira Hori (堀晃, born 1944, Japan, f)
- Tatsuo Hori (堀辰雄, 1904–1953, Japan, f/p/nf)
- Daigaku Horiguchi (堀口大学, 1892–1981, Japan, p)
- Sydney Horler (1888–1964, England, f)
- Nick Hornby (born 1967, England, f/nf/p)
- Richard Henry Horne (1802–1884, England, p/nf)
- Roy Horniman (1874–1930, England, f/d)
- Wendy Hornsby (born 1947, US, f)
- Paul Hornschemeier (born 1977, US, nf)
- E. W. Hornung (1866–1921, England, f/p)
- Michael Horovitz (1935–2021, England, p)
- Anthony Horowitz (born 1955, England, f)
- Oktay Rıfat Horozcu (1914–1988, Ottoman E/Turkey, p/d)
- Elaine Horseman (1925–1999, England, ch/f)
- Maria Teresa Horta (born 1937, Portugal, p/nf)
- Africanus Horton (1835–1883, Sierra Leone, nf)
- George Moses Horton (1798 – post-1867, US, p)
- Oto Horvat (born 1967, Yugoslavia/Italy, p/f)
- János Horváth (1921–2019, Hungary/US, nf)
- John Horvath (1924–2015, Hungary/US, nf), born János Horváth
- Ödön von Horváth (1901–1938, Austria-Hungary/France, d/f)
- Claire Horwell (living, England, nf)
- William Horwood (born 1944, England, f)
- Sally El Hosaini (living, Wales/Egypt, f/d)
- Kazushi Hosaka (保坂和志, born 1956, Japan, f)
- Shin'ichi Hoshi (星新一), 1926–1997, Japan, f)
- Tatsuko Hoshino (星野立子), 1903–1984, Japan, p)
- Hoshino Tenchi (星野天知), 1862–1950, Japan, p/nf)
- Emma Hosken (1845–1884, England, f)
- Janette Turner Hospital (born 1942, Australia/US, f)
- Khondakar Ashraf Hossain (1950–2013, E Pakistan/Bangladesh, p/nf)
- M Sakhawat Hossain (born 1948, E Pakistan/Bangladesh, nf)
- Mir Mosharraf Hossain (1847–1911, India, f/d/nf)
- Saad Z Hossain (living, Bangladesh, nf/f)
- Sadat Hossain (born 1984, Bangladesh, p/d/f)
- Selina Hossain (born 1947, India/Bangladesh, f)
- Khaled Hosseini (born 1965, Afghanistan/US, f/nf)
- Eugenio María de Hostos (1839–1903, Puerto Rico, nf/f)
- Michel Houellebecq (born 1956 or 1958, Réunion, f/p/nf)
- Zehira Houfani (born 1952, Algeria/Canada, f)
- Stephen Hough (born 1961, England/Australia, nf)
- Joan Houlihan (living, US, p)
- Gisèle Hountondji (born 1954, Benin, f)
- Paulin J. Hountondji (born 1942, Benin, nf)
- Hasan Hourani (1974–2003, Palestine/US, ch)
- A. E. Housman (1859–1936, England, p/nf)
- Ali Squalli Houssaini (1932–2018, f/nf/ch)
- Jeanne Wakatsuki Houston (1934–2024, US, f/nf)
- Zach Houston (living, US, p)
- Willem van den Hout (1915–1985, Netherlands, nf/ch), pseudonym Willy van der Heide
- Colette Sénami Agossou Houeto (born 1939, Benin, p)
- Anders Hovden (1860–1943, Norway, p/f)
- Chenjerai Hove (1956–2015, S Rhodesia/Zimbabwe, p/f/nf)
- Hovhannes Hovhannisyan (1864–1929, Russian E/USSR, p/nf)
- Ragnar Hovland (born 1952, Norway, f/p/ch)
- Naghash Hovnatan (1661–1722, Armenia, p)
- Anthony Howard (1934–2010, England, nf)
- Edward Howard (1624–1712, England, p/d)
- Edward Howard (1793–1841, England, f)
- Elizabeth Jane Howard (1923–2014, England, f/d/nf)
- Henry Howard, Earl of Surrey (1516/1517–1547, England, p)
- Linda Howard (born 1950, US, f)
- Richard Howard (1929–2022, US, p/nf)
- Robert E. Howard (1906–1936, US, f)
- Robert Guy Howarth (1906–1974, Australia, nf/p)
- Youssef Howayek (1882–1967, Ottoman E/Lebanon, nf)
- Charles Howe (1661–1742, England, nf)
- Fanny Howe (1940–2025, US, p/f)
- George Howe (1769–1821, Saint Kitts/Australia, nf)
- Julia Ward Howe (1819–1910, US, p/nf)
- Susan Howe (born 1937, US, p/nf)
- Ada Verdun Howell (1902–1981, Australia, p)
- Daniel Howell (born 1991, England, nf)
- Hannah Howell (born 1950, US, f)
- Thomas Jones Howell (died 1858, England, nf)
- William Dean Howells (1837–1920, US, f/nf/d)
- Edith Howes (1872–1954, N Zealand, ch)
- Francis Howgill (1618–1669, England, nf)
- Anna Mary Howitt (1824–1884, England/Austria, p/nf)
- Godfrey Howitt (1800–1873, England/Australia, nf)
- Mary Howitt (1799–1888, England/Italy, p/nf/cs)
- Richard Howitt (1799–1869, England, p)
- William Howitt (1792–1879, England, nf)
- Janni Howker (living, Cyprus/England, f/ch)
- Aslaug Høydal (1916–2007, Norway, f/p/ch)
- Ida Hegazi Høyer (born 1981, Norway, f)
- Fred Hoyle (1915–2001, England, nf)
- Bohumil Hrabal (1914–1997, Czechoslovakia, p/f)
- Hrabanus Maurus (c. 780–856, East Frankish Kingdom, nf/p)
- Chernorizets Hrabar (fl. 9th–10th c., Bulgaria, nf)
- Kristinn Hrafnsson (born 1962, Iceland, nf)
- Nikolai Hristozov (1931–2015, Bulgaria, f/p)

== Ht–Hy ==
- Khin Khin Htoo (born 1965, Burma/Myanmar, f/nf)
- Ganggang Hu Guidice (胡剛剛, born 1984, China/US, nf/f/p)
- Hu Lanqi (胡兰畦, 1901–1994, China, nf)
- Hu Sanxing (胡三省, 1230–1302, China, nf)
- Hu Shih (胡適, 1891–1962, China, nf)
- Huaisu (懷素, 737–799, China, nf)
- Hua Qianfang (宁学明, 1978, China, nf)
- Huang E (黄峨, 1498–1569, China, p)
- Huang Ruheng (黃汝亨, 1558–1626, China, p)
- Huang Tingjian (黃庭堅, 1045–1105, China, p)
- Huang Yuanyong (黃遠庸, 1885–1915, China, nf)
- Huang Zongxi (黃宗羲, 1610–1695, China, nf)
- Huang Zunxian (黃遵憲, 1848–1905, China, p)
- Madame Huarui (徐惠妃, c. 940–976, China, p)
- L. Ron Hubbard (1911–1986, US, f/nf)
- Nancy Hubbard (born 1963, US, nf)
- Ricarda Huch (1864–1947, Germany, nf/f/p)
- Peter Huchel (1903–1981, Germany, p)
- Mohammad Nurul Huda (born 1949, Pakistan/Bangladesh, p/f)
- Jurij Hudolin (born 1973, Yugoslavia/Slovenia, p/nf)
- Deal W. Hudson (born 1949, US, nf)
- William Henry Hudson (1841–1922, Argentina/England, nf/f)
- Annie Campbell Huestis (1878-1960, Canada, p, f)
- Conrad Busken Huet (1826–1886, Netherlands, nf)
- Pauline von Hügel (1858–1901, England, f/nf)
- Lynn Huggins-Cooper (born 1964, England, nf/ch)
- Hugh of Flavigny (born c. 1064, France, nf)
- Dafydd ab Hugh (born 1960, Wales, f)
- Ann Harriet Hughes (1852–1910, Wales, f/p), pseudonym Gwyneth Vaughan
- Carol Hughes (born 1961, England/US, ch)
- Dorothy B. Hughes (1904–1993, US, f/nf)
- Ellen Hughes (1867–1927, Wales, nf/f/p)
- Frieda Hughes (born 1960, England/Australia, ch/p)
- Hugh Hughes (1693–1776, Wales, p)
- John Ceiriog Hughes (1832–1887, Wales, p)
- Jonathan Hughes (1721–1805, Wales, p)
- Langston Hughes (1901–1967, US, p/f/d)
- Richard Hughes (1900–1976, England/Wales, p/f/d)
- Richard Cyril Hughes (1932–2022, Wales, nf)
- Ted Hughes (1930–1998, England, p/ch)
- Thomas Hughes (1822–1896, England, f/nf)
- Thomas Rowland Hughes (1903–1949, Wales, f/d/p)
- Richard Hugo (1923–1982, US, p/nf)
- Victor Hugo (1802–1885, France, f/p/d)
- Vicente Huidobro (1893–1948, Chile, p)
- Emma Huismans (born 1947, Netherlands/S Africa, f/nf)
- Hulda (1881–1946, Iceland, p/f/nf)
- Coral Hull (born 1965, Australia, p/nf)
- Lynda Hull (1954–1994, US, p)
- John Hulme (born 1969, US, ch)
- Keri Hulme (1947–2021, N Zealand, f/p)
- T. E. Hulme (1883–1917, England, nf/p)
- Marie-Thérèse Humbert (born 1940, Mauritius/France, f)
- Alexander Hume (1558–1609, Scotland, p)
- David Hume (1711–1776, Scotland, nf)
- Fergus Hume (1859–1932, England, f)
- Norbert Hummelt (born 1962, Germany, p/nf)
- Olga Humo (1919–2013, Yugoslavia/Serbia, nf)
- Lawrence Humphrey (c. 1527–1590, England, nf)
- Edward Morgan Humphreys (1882–1955, Wales, f/nf)
- Eliza Humphreys (1850–1938, England, f/nf)
- Humphrey Humphreys (1648–1712, Wales, nf)
- Barry Humphries (1934–2023, Australia, d/nf/f)
- Wilhelm Hünermann (1900–1975, Germany, nf/f)
- Christian Friedrich Hunold (1680–1721, Germany, f), pseudonym Menantes
- Angela Elwell Hunt (born 1957, US, nf/ch)
- Des Hunt (born 1941, N Zealand, ch)
- Irene Hunt (1907–2001, US, ch)
- Julian Hunt, Baron Hunt of Chesterton (born 1941, England, nf)
- Leigh Hunt (1784–1859, England, nf/p)
- Sam Hunt (born 1946, N Zealand, p)
- Stephen Hunt (born 1966, Canada, f)
- Tristram Hunt (born 1974, England, nf)
- Violet Hunt (1862–1942, England, f)
- Anne Hunter (1742–1821, England, p)
- Erin Hunter (fl. 2000s, England), collective pseudonym
- Jillian Hunter (born 1950, Scotland/US, f)
- Louis C. Hunter (1898–1984, US, nf)
- Norman Hunter (1899–1995, England, ch)
- Rex Hunter (1889–1960, N Zealand, p/d/f)
- Roland Huntford (1927–2026, England, nf)
- Sándor Hunyady (1890–1942, Hungary, f/d)
- Dương Thu Hương (born 1947, Vietnam, nf)
- Hồ Xuân Hương (胡春香, 1772–1822, Vietnam, p)
- Marie Huot (1846–1930, France, p/nf)
- Hasan Azizul Huq (1939–2021, India/Bangladesh, f)
- Jozef Miloslav Hurban (1817–1888, Austria-Hungary, nf)
- Douglas Hurd (born 1930, England, f/nf)
- Graham Hurley (born 1946, England, f)
- Thomas Hürlimann (born 1950, Switzerland, f/d)
- Zora Neale Hurston (1891–1960, US, f/nf)
- Osvaldo Hurtado (born 1939, Ecuador, nf)
- Gregg Hurwitz (living, US, f/d)
- Hanns Dieter Hüsch (1925–2005, Germany, d)
- Sibyl Marvin Huse (1866–1939, France/US, nf)
- Ihab Husni (born 1966, Egypt, ch/f)
- Abdullah Hussain (1920–2014, Malaya/Malaysia, f/nf)
- Intizar Hussain (1925–2016, India/Pakistan, f/p/nf)
- Ebrahim Hussein (born 1943, Tanzania, d/p)
- Taha Hussein (1889–1973, Egypt, nf/p)
- Nancy Huston (born 1953, Canada/France, f/nf)
- Siri Hustvedt (born 1955, US, f/nf/p)
- A. S. M. Hutchinson (1879–1971, England, f)
- Pearse Hutchinson (1927–2012, Scotland/Ireland, p)
- R. C. Hutchinson (1907–1975, England, f/d)
- Robert Hutchinson (born 1957, US, nf)
- Angela Huth (born 1938, England, f/nf)
- Lorna Hutson (born 1958, Germany/England, nf)
- Shaun Hutson (born 1958, England, f)
- Ulrich von Hutten (1488–1523, Germany/Switzerland, nf/p)
- Emily Huws (born 1942, Wales, ch)
- Aldous Huxley (1884–1963, England, f/nf/p)
- Andrew Huxley (1917–2012, England, nf)
- Anthony Huxley (1920–1992, England, nf)
- Elspeth Huxley (1907–1997, England/Kenya, f/nf)
- Francis Huxley (1923–2016, England, nf)
- Julian Huxley (1887–1975, England, nf)
- Thomas Henry Huxley (1825–1895, England, nf)
- Christiaan Huygens (1629–1695, Netherlands, nf)
- Constantijn Huygens (1596–1687, Netherlands, p)
- Douglas Smith Huyghue (1916–1991, Canada/Australia, p/f/nf)
- Joris-Karl Huysmans (1848–1907, France, f/nf)
- Pavol Országh Hviezdoslav (1849–1921, Austria-Hungary/Czechoslovakia, p/d)
- Stefán frá Hvítadal (1887–1933, Iceland, p), pseudonym of Stefán Sigurðsson
- Michal Hvorecký (born 1976, Czechoslovakia/Slovakia, f/nf)
- Edward Hyams (1910–1975, England/France, nf/f)
- Marina Hyde (born 1974, England, nf)
- Robin Hyde (1906–1939, N Zealand, p)
- Hasnat Abdul Hye (born 1937, India/Bangladesh, f/nf)
- Jill Hyem (1937–2016, England, d)
- Helen von Kolnitz Hyer (1896–1983, US, p)
- Anton Hykisch (born 1932, Czechoslovakia/Slovakia, nf)
- Hypereides (c. 390–322 BCE, Greece, nf)
