= Vartan Gregorian =

American academic administrator (1934–2021)

- Վարդան Գրիգորյան
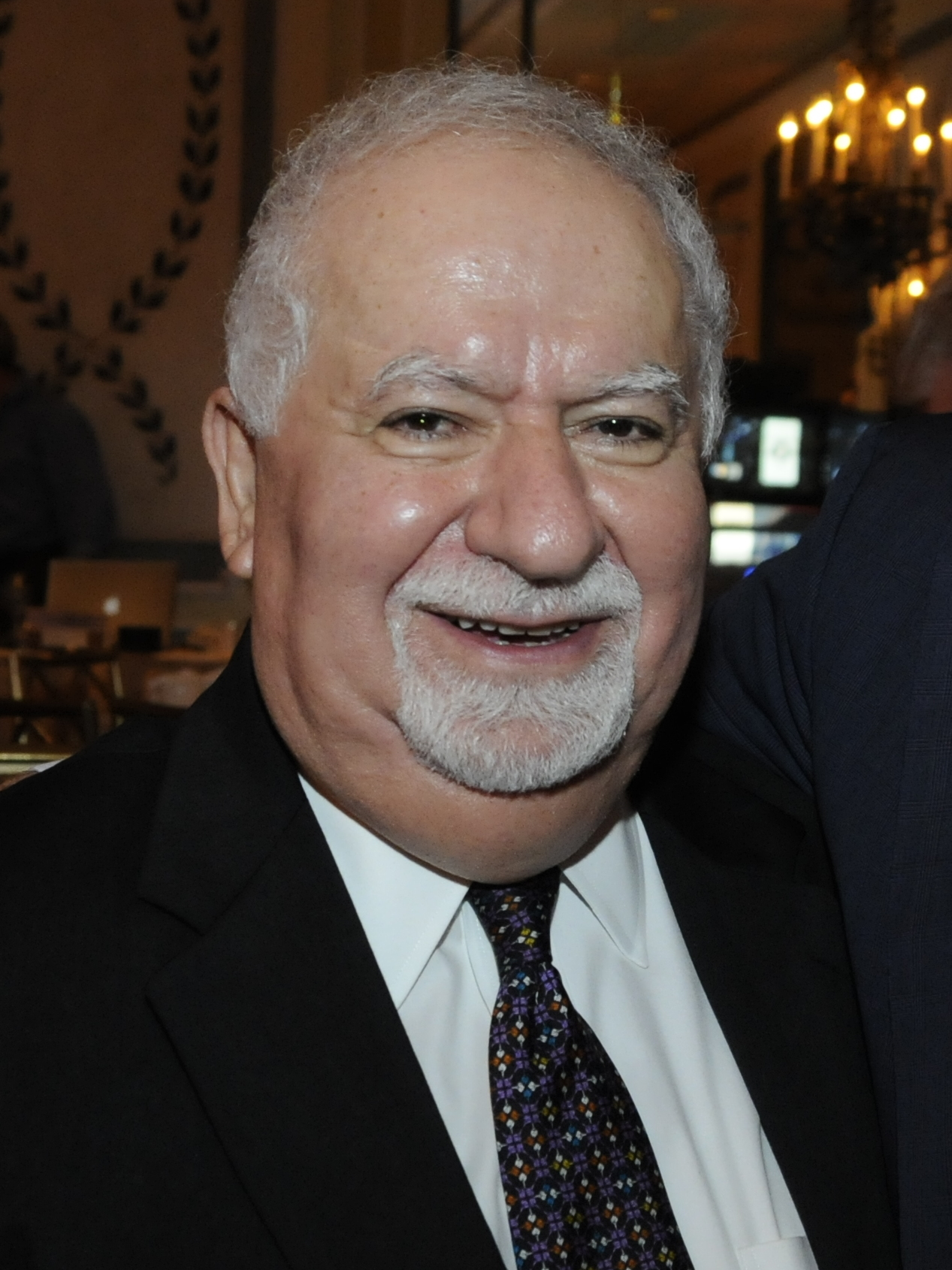

12th President of the Carnegie Corporation of New York
- In office June 1997 – April 15, 2021
- Preceded by: David A. Hamburg
- Succeeded by: Thomas Kean (Acting); Janet L. Robinson (Acting)

16th President of Brown University
- In office April 1989 – June 1997
- Preceded by: Howard Swearer
- Succeeded by: E. Gordon Gee

9th President of the New York Public Library
- In office June 1, 1981 – December 1, 1989
- Preceded by: Richard Couper
- Succeeded by: Timothy S. Healy

23rd Provost of the University of Pennsylvania
- In office January 1979 – October 1980
- Preceded by: Eliot Stellar
- Succeeded by: Benjamin Shen (acting)

Personal details
- Born: April 8, 1934 Tabriz, Imperial State of Iran
- Died: April 15, 2021 (aged 87) New York City, U.S.
- Relations: Maggie Haberman (daughter-in-law)
- Education: Stanford University (BA, MA, PhD)
- Awards: National Humanities Medal (1998); Presidential Medal of Freedom (2004)
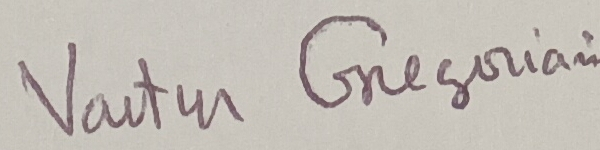
- Signature

Vartan Gregorian (Note: Armenian: Վարդան Գրիգորեան, romanized: Vardan Grigorean; Persian: وارتان گرگوریان) (April 8, 1934 – April 15, 2021) was an Iranian-American of Armenian descent. He was an academic, educator, and historian, and he served as president of the Carnegie Corporation from 1997 to 2021.

Gregorian moved to the United States from Iran at age 22. He graduated with a PhD from Stanford University. He subsequently taught at several universities and his work as a historian focused mainly on the Muslim world. He went on to join the University of Pennsylvania faculty, then as its provost. From 1981 to 1989 he served as president of the New York Public Library during which he succeeded in financially stabilizing the institution and revitalizing its cultural importance. From 1989 to 1997 he served as the first foreign-born president of Brown University. Gregorian's work has been widely acknowledged. He received dozens of honorary doctorates, the National Humanities Medal (1998), and the Presidential Medal of Freedom (2004).

== Early life and education ==
Vartan Gregorian was born on April 8, 1934, in the city of Tabriz in northern Iran to Christian Armenian parents Samuel B. Gregorian and Shushanik (née Mirzaian). Both his parents had a high school education. His father worked for the Anglo-Iranian Oil Company in Abadan and was mostly absent. His mother died of pneumonia at 26, when he was six and his father later remarried. Vartan and his younger sister, Ojik, were raised by his maternal grandmother, Voski Mirzaian. She came from a family of scribes, but was an illiterate peasant and Gregorian described her as wise. His grandfather owned an inn for camel caravans. Regarding his family origins, he said that he could not determine if they were indigenous to the area, or settled there in the 15th, 16th, or 19th century, because "they were mostly from peasant villages that migrated to Tabriz."

He first went to an Armenian elementary school in Tabriz, then a Russian one when northern Iran was under Soviet occupation. When Iran regained control of the area, he learned Persian. He was told by Edgar Maloyan, the French vice-council in Tabriz of Armenian origin, that he had to go to Beirut, Lebanon because he was "too smart to stay in Tabriz". He followed his advice and continued his studies at the Collège Armenien (Jemaran) in Beirut, graduating in 1955. Before moving to Beirut, he spoke Armenian, some Russian, Persian, and Turkish. He learned French within a year. Among his teachers was Simon Vratsian, the last prime minister of the First Republic of Armenia (1918–20). He was one of Vratsian's unofficial secretaries. Gregorian described him as both his mentor and his benevolent benefactor. He also briefly worked as a reporter in Beirut before emigrating to the United States in 1956. Gregorian came to the United States with the initial intention to return to Beirut to teach Armenian history in a high school. In another interview, Gregorian said he studied Portuguese so he could become the principal/director of an Armenian high school in São Paulo, Brazil. In 1956, he enrolled at Stanford University and completed his BA in history and humanities in two years, graduating with honors in 1958.

== Teaching career ==
Gregorian earned a dual PhD in history and humanities (art history, philosophy, Romance languages, religion, classics) from Stanford University in 1964. His dissertation was titled "Traditionalism and Modernism in Islam". He began his teaching career at University of California, Berkeley where he was briefly instructor in Armenian history and culture in 1960. He taught European and Middle Eastern history at San Francisco State College between 1962 and 1968. He was initially instructor, then in 1964 he was named assistant professor and, in 1966, associate professor of history. In 1965–66 he had a one-year fellowship in Soviet Armenia. He was a visiting associate professor of history at University of California, Los Angeles in 1968, before moving to University of Texas at Austin as associate professor in 1968–1970 and professor of history in 1970–1972.

Gregorian joined the University of Pennsylvania faculty in 1972 as Tarzian Professor of Armenian and Caucasian History and Professor of South Asian history. In 1974 he became the founding dean of Penn's Faculty of Arts and Sciences and served on that role until 1978. He subsequently served as the 23rd provost of Penn from January 1979 to October 1980. In 1980 Gregorian was widely considered to be the most probable candidate for president of the University of Pennsylvania as he had the "resounding support of most of the deans, the Faculty Senate, and the Undergraduate Assembly." Gregorian was seen as a charismatic leader and one with "flamboyant style and ever-present brilliance". However, the university trustees chose Sheldon Hackney instead.

From 1984 to 1989 Gregorian was professor of history and Near Eastern studies at New York University and at The New School for Social Research.

== New York Public Library ==
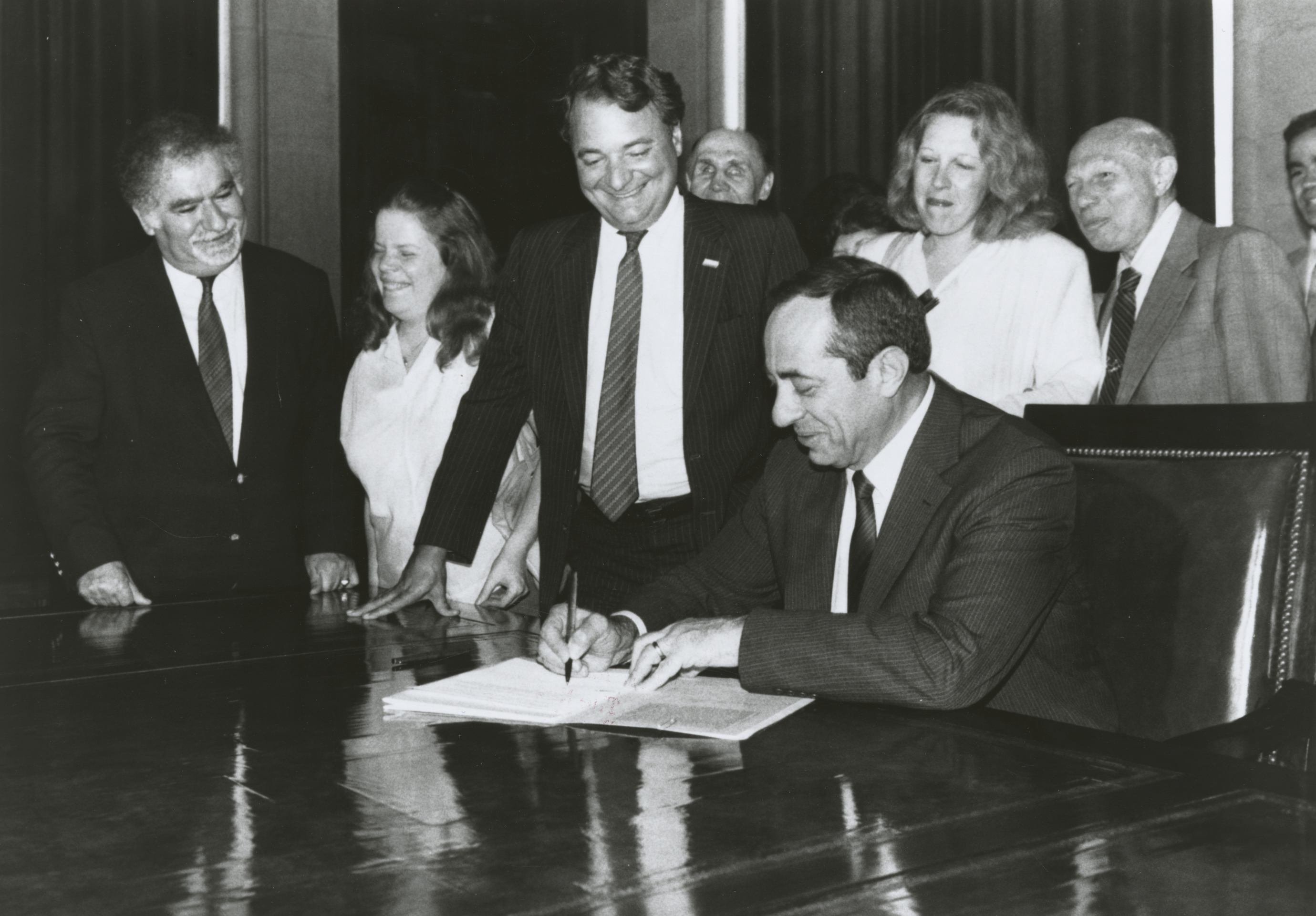
Gregorian (left) watches New York Governor Mario Cuomo sign a bill authorizing the financing of a new Library for the Blind and Physically Handicapped, 1988.

From 1981 to 1989 Gregorian served as president of the New York Public Library (NYPL), a network that then contained four research libraries and 83 circulating libraries. He was highly successful in the position, particularly as a fundraiser. Gregorian nearly doubled the library's budget and by the end of his tenure, he had secured $327 to $400 million for the NYPL from individuals, foundations, and corporations. He was credited with restoring the "crumbling landmark to a vibrant cultural nexus" and rescuing one of America's "known public institutions from financial and cultural crisis and thereby restor[ing] the stature of public libraries nationwide." According to Michael Gorman, Gregorian was one of the few "shining exceptions" of academics running libraries well. He noted that as the head of the NYPL Gregorian "can fairly be said to have rescued that venerable and valuable institution from pauperism."

During Gregorian tenure, the library's Main Branch in Manhattan was restored with $42 million. He also succeeded in getting approval from city planning authorities to restore the nearby Bryant Park. Upon his departure, The New York Times wrote that as president of the NYPL, Gregorian "revived an empire of learning that is more than ever a national treasure." Barlow Der Mugrdechian noted that Gregorian "transformed what was then a decaying and underfinanced institution into a center of New York cultural life." His tenure at the NYPL made Gregorian a reputable institutional leader. In May 1999 a hall of the library's Main Branch was named after Gregorian.

Upon his death, NYPL recognized that "his leadership and tenacity revitalized and reaffirmed the Library as the preeminent civic and educational institution that New Yorkers know and love today. Through his efforts and leadership, the Library was able to weather, recover, and rebound from a decade of fiscal crisis, restoring hours of service in the branches, renovating many historic locations, growing and strengthening circulating collections with a focus on multilingual and multicultural materials, increasing education and literacy programs, and investing in curators and expert staff in the research libraries, among other things."

In 2023, the trustees of The New York Public Library voted to rename the Center for Research in the Humanities to the Vartan Gregorian Center for Research in the Humanities.

== Brown University ==
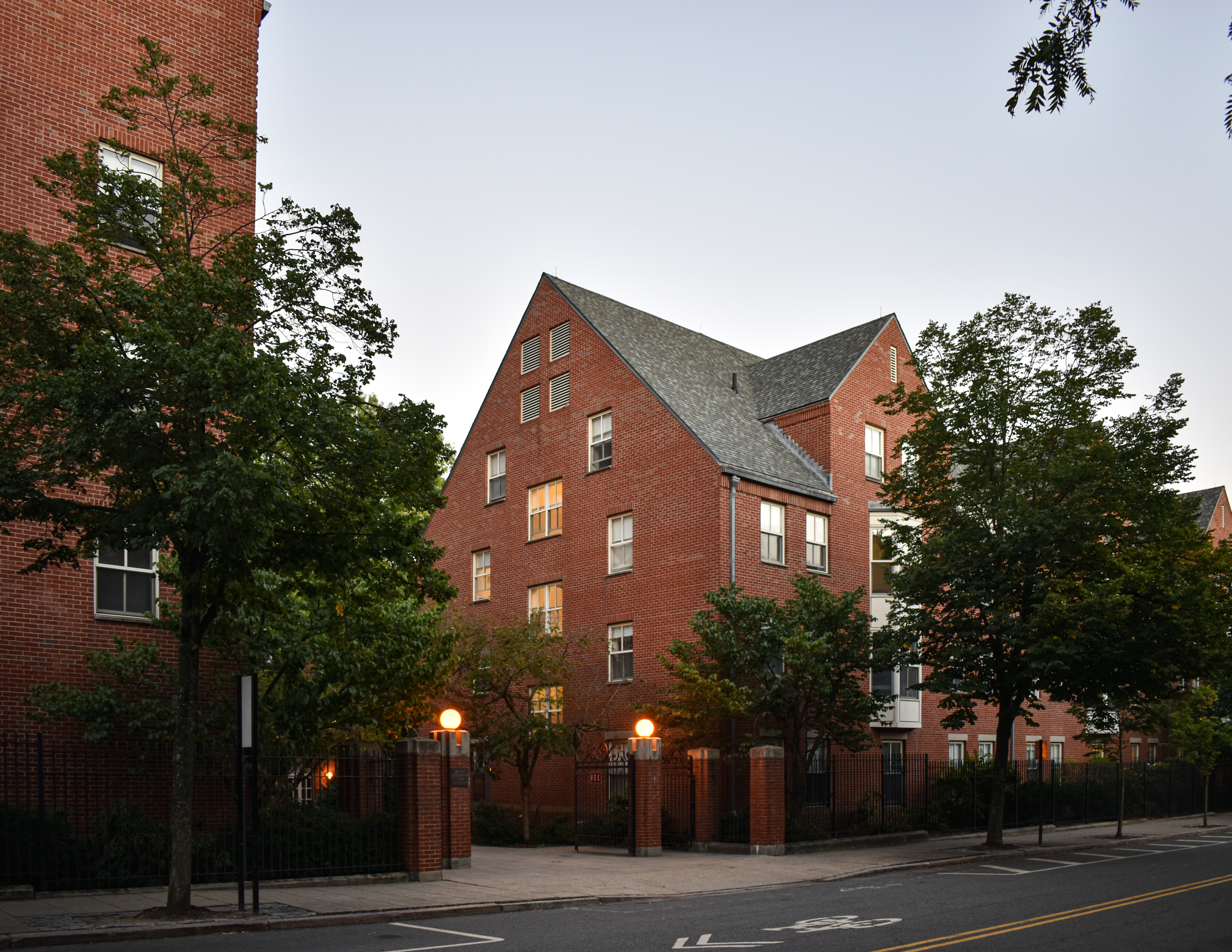
Vartan Gregorian Quadrangle at Brown University was named after Gregorian in 1999

Brown University awarded Gregorian an honorary doctorate in 1984 for his work at the NYPL.

Four years later, in August 1988 Gregorian was chosen to become Brown's 16th and first foreign-born president. He was officially inaugurated as president in April 1989. When he took over, Brown had the lowest endowment ($370 million) in the Ivy League. He served in that position for eight years, until June 1997. In his eight-year tenure, Gregorian raised around $535 million, raising the total to $850 million. He is also credited with having strengthened Brown's reputation and "enhancing its traditional emphasis on undergraduate education." During his presidency, the university "hired 270 new faculty members, expanded the library, and established eleven new departments." The university also underwent increasing internationalization.

At Brown, Gregorian continued teaching a freshman seminar and a senior seminar and a course on Alexis de Tocqueville with Stephen Graubard. He was described as being a "wildly popular figure on campus."

== Carnegie Corporation ==
In January 1997 Gregorian was chosen as the president of the Carnegie Corporation of New York, at the time the 16th largest foundation in the U.S., known for its advocacy of education and peace. He assumed the position in June 1997 and became the 12th president and the first outsider—not from within the foundation—to head it. At Carnegie Corporation, Gregorian switched from his previous fundraiser role to one of a fund granter. He commented on it: "People think that giving away money is an easy job. Actually, it's harder than raising money, as you well know, because you have so many excellent projects that compete for funding. The issue is, I tell our staff: Are we going to be an incubator or an oxygen tank?" He advocated "initiatives in teacher education, international peace, and cooperative efforts with other foundations." Commenting on his work at Carnegie Corporation, he said that his main aim was "teaching ideas and values. But most importantly, also, preparation of new citizens. One of our great programs, which I'm very proud of at Carnegie is strengthening US democracy."

== Armenian causes ==
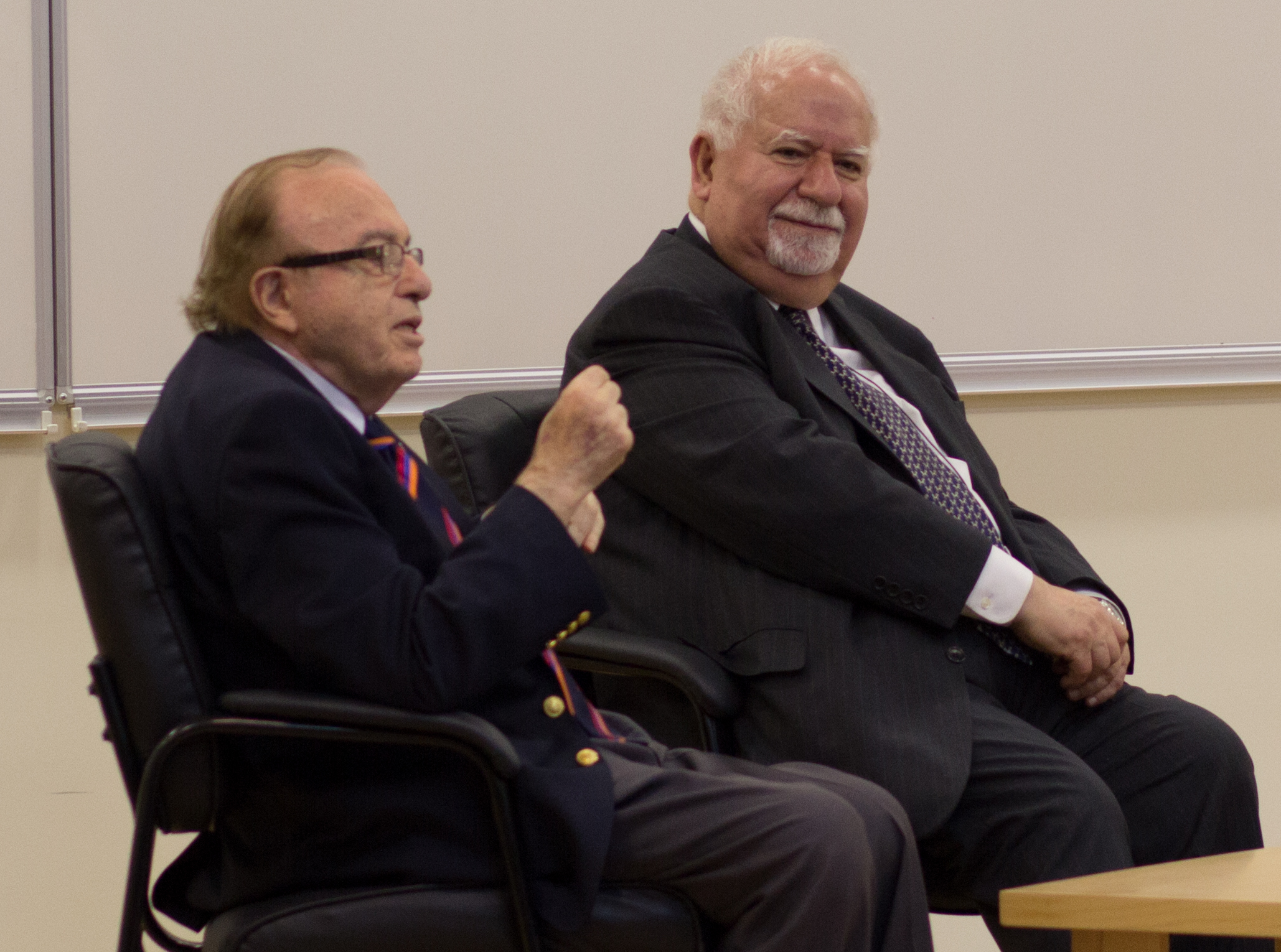
Gregorian and Mihran Agbabian at the American University of Armenia, 2014

Gregorian was involved in projects in the Armenian American community and Armenia. Barlow Der Mugrdechian described him as a "highly visible model for Armenians." He was a "much-sought-after" keynote speaker at Armenian events, for which he did not take money: "I've never accepted one penny from any Armenian source for the past 30 years."

Gregorian was outspoken about the importance of education in Armenia. He stated in a 2009 interview: "The first thing that Armenia has to invest in, like the Scandinavian countries, is education. Even in the Armenian army, they should teach computer science, mathematics, other sciences." He also called on the Armenian church to invest in education. He was on the Board of Governors of UWC Dilijan, the first international boarding school in Armenia founded in 2014. He donated 1,500 books to the school and a learning center is named after him. Gregorian donated hundreds of books to the American University of Armenia in 2010–14.

In 2016 Gregorian co-founded the Aurora Prize for Awakening Humanity with Ruben Vardanyan and Noubar Afeyan. It honors individuals for humanitarian work on behalf of the survivors of the Armenian genocide. Armenia's Prime Minister Nikol Pashinyan called it the "Armenian Nobel Peace Prize."

Gregorian was honored by the Armenian government, the Armenian Church, and Armenian diaspora organizations. In 1999 he received the St. Gregory the Illuminator Medal, the Armenian Church's highest secular award, from Catholicos Karekin I. The National Academy of Sciences of Armenia named him an Honorary Doctor in 2001 and elected him as a Foreign Member in 2008. President of Armenia Serzh Sargsyan awarded him the Mkhitar Gosh Medal in 2013 and the Order of Honor in 2017. He met President of Armenia Armen Sarkissian on several occasions.

In October 2016 Gregorian joined other prominent Armenians in calling the government of Armenia to adopt "new development strategies based on inclusiveness and collective action" and to create "an opportunity for the Armenian world to pivot toward a future of prosperity, to transform the post-Soviet Armenian Republic into a vibrant, modern, secure, peaceful and progressive homeland for a global nation."

The National Association for Armenian Studies and Research (NAASR) headquarters in Belmont, Massachusetts, was officially renamed to the NAASR Vartan Gregorian Building in January 2019.

== Views ==
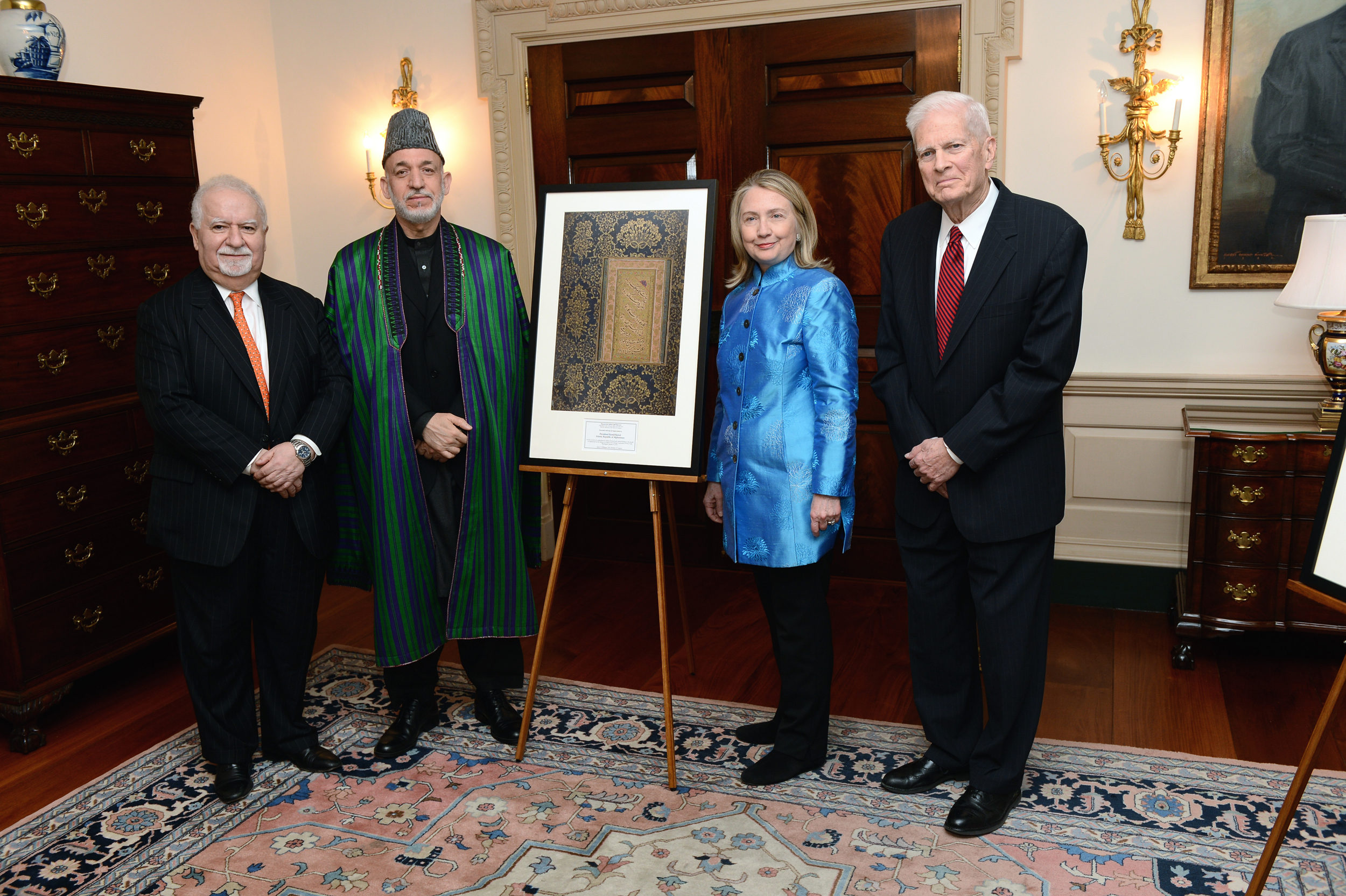
Gregorian with Hamid Karzai, Hillary Clinton, and James H. Billington

Gregorian was described as a public intellectual, who often commented on educational and political matters, and a life-long advocate for education. It was said during his lifetime that "He has become increasingly worried about America's deemphasizing studies in the humanities, which has been replaced by the desire to learn marketable skills, and he is concerned by the failure of high schools to prepare students for college so that they often spend the first two years at universities trying to catch up to where they should be."

Gregorian had a reputation as a "visionary educator". In 1988 Bill Moyers described him as "an evangelist for education". He advised Walter Annenberg and the Annenberg Foundation on school reform. Gregorian believed that the sole function of education is to provide an "introduction to learning." He believed that "we can produce an educated, cultured person" in four years who would include "all the possible elements of professionalism, and know-how, and a career, and also a vocation." Commenting on the rise of college tuition, he said a special tax was needed: "Five percent of the tax Californians pay should go to universities."

Gregorian called teachers, journalists, and librarians the most important jobs for the United States, and that without "educated journalists and free press [...] you're going to have an Orwellian society which we always dreaded." He said in 1988 that because there was an explosion of information, which was not equal the explosion of knowledge, there were "great possibilities of manipulating our society by inundating us with undigested information." He elaborated: "So instead of 1984, Orwell saying deny information, now one other way of paralyzing people is by inundating with trivia, as well as a major way of paralyzing our choices, by giving so much that we cannot possible digest it."

=== Politics ===
Gregorian was politically liberal. In the 1960 Democratic Party presidential primaries he collected signatures for Adlai Stevenson II and then for John F. Kennedy. He stated that he was "just enchanted and transformed by [Kennedy's] rhetoric and his vision and youthfulness, and so forth, about an idealistic America where everybody had to chip in." In 1966 he served as faculty adviser to the Maoist Progressive Labor Party at the San Francisco State University. In a 2003 interview, Gregorian stated that he made "nondiscrimination on the basis of sexual orientation an official policy at both the University of Pennsylvania and at Brown." He argued for affirmative action in higher education, "at least at this stage in our history." However, he noted that what is needed is reform in the public education to "eliminate the social disparities. How long will we need affirmative action? As long as K through 12 education is unequal and weak."

Gregorian was "known for his commitment to human rights and interest in foreign affairs, especially conflict resolution and intellectual freedom." In his 1989 speech as president of Brown University, he called for a "value-oriented, moral sense of politics", as Patrick Garry describes it. Gregorian stated that a democratic society needs freedom and choice, but also a moral center and not a moral enclosure. Garry wrote that Gregorian strove to "inject moral passion into an increasingly listless liberalism. He advocates a moral sense, but not as defined by conservative beliefs." Instead, the "moral center should come from a public moral discourse and from the choices of individuals regarding moral values and social ideas." "We need Linda Greenhouses, we need individuals who would be challenging the system. We need a Bill Buckley … new Bill Buckleys. We need new I. F. Stones from the Left and the Right who could challenge, who could create a kind of dialogue, rather than monologue", he said in 2009.

Gregorian said that it is more important to integrate immigrants into American society than assimilate them. "America is about citizenship, about rights, about privileges, about responsibilities, knowledge of America's past, engagement in its future and so a part of being both individualist, as well as part of the organic community, which is the United States", he said.

In April 2009 Gregorian joined Václav Havel, Prince Hassan bin Talal, Desmond Tutu, and Yōhei Sasakawa in calling on The People's Republic of China to rescind the decision to execute Tibetan activists involved in the 2008 Tibetan unrest and "provide them with an opportunity to be re-tried in a judicial process that is more in keeping with the international standards that China says that it adheres to."

In May 2009 Gregorian proposed to U.S. President Barack Obama that he send a message to the Iranian authorities, Supreme Leader Ayatollah Ali Khamenei and President Mahmoud Ahmadinejad, that "mixes Obama's characteristic emphasis on respect and cultural sensitivity with any apology for Mossadegh's overthrow, thanks for Iranian condemnation of 9/11, and a conciliatory tone in asking for the abandonment of nuclear enrichment."

In June 2009 Obama appointed Gregorian as a White House Fellow.

In 2009 Richard Heffner suggested that Gregorian would be great as a successor to Hillary Clinton as a U.S. Senator from New York.

== Personal life ==
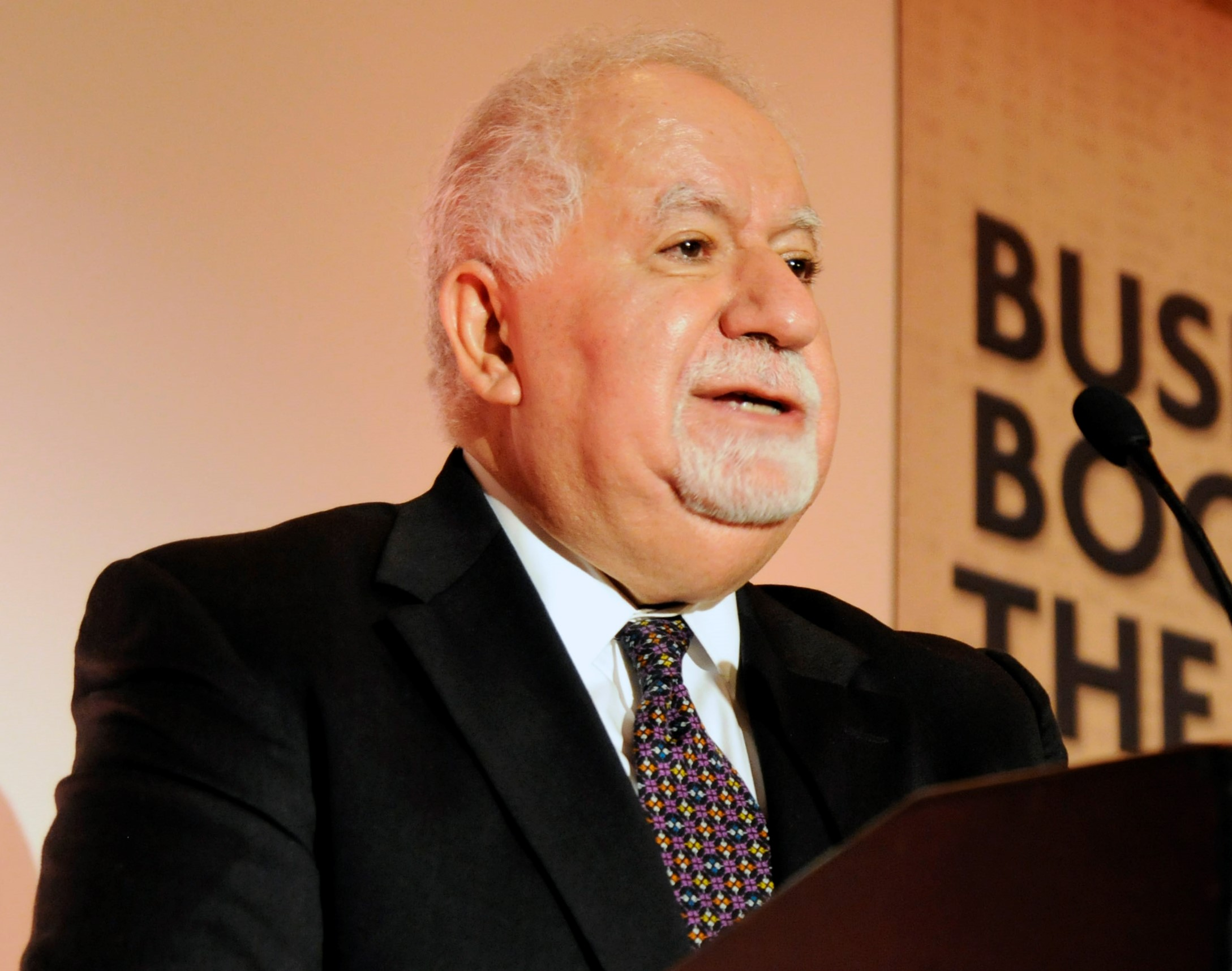
Gregorian in 2010

Gregorian spoke Armenian, French, and English. He understood Persian and Arabic. He did not speak English when he arrived in the US in 1956, and later spoke with a "soft Middle Eastern accent." Gregorian faced housing discrimination because of his Armenian origins when he moved to New York City in 1981. Although he served as an altar boy in the Armenian Apostolic Church in Tabriz, Gregorian was an Armenian Catholic.

Gregorian married Clare (née Russell) on March 25, 1960. They met at Stanford. She died on April 28, 2018, at the age of 80. She was a "community and volunteer leader in several states and cities." She was an advocate of women's rights, literacy and the arts and was described as a "driving force behind the establishment" of Rhode Island Public Radio. Janet L. Robinson stated that her "unwavering support of organizations such as Rhode Island Public Radio, Providence Public Library and Planned Parenthood proved to be a critical factor in the success of these organizations." They had three sons: Vahé, Raffi, and Dareh Ardashes. As of 2003, Vahe was chief sportswriter at the St. Louis Post-Dispatch, Raffi was working at the State Department, and Dareh was covering the civil courts for the New York Post. Dareh is married to Maggie Haberman.

Gregorian's interests included chess and Armenian music.

Gregorian had a surgery for kidney removal in October 1999.

Vartan Gregorian died on April 15, 2021, after being hospitalized due to stomach pain. He was 87.

== Recognition ==
Gregorian was one of America's "most respected and frequently honored educators and intellectuals." Barlow Der Mugrdechian described him as "one of the most noted educators and leaders in higher education" in the U.S. Hendrik Hertzberg wrote in The New Yorker in 2008: "The impossibly distinguished Vartan Gregorian is a one-man academy of arts, letters, and the humanities." Peter Gay wrote in The New York Times in 2003: "If the word had not been so badly debased in our time, I would call him a civilian hero." French Ambassador to the United States Gérard Araud described Gregorian as a "visionary and a living example of the modern man of letters, for whom education and knowledge is the key to opportunity and peace."

Upon his death, Armenian Prime Minister Nikol Pashinyan described Gregorian as "one of the greatest Armenian Americans." Darren Walker, President of the Ford Foundation, called him an "icon in higher education and philanthropy." New York Mayor Bill de Blasio said Gregorian "single-handedly saved this sacred institution," referring to the New York Public Library. New Orleans Mayor LaToya Cantrell noted that Gregorian was "instrumental in helping restore and reopen" the Keller Library after Hurricane Katrina. Former New York Mayor Mike Bloomberg wrote that Gregorian was a "towering intellect whose passion for public service was matched only by his kindness and compassion for others, and his loving devotion to his family." Samantha Power and Fadlo R. Khuri called Gregorian their hero. The International Crisis Group described him as an "extraordinary leader and a champion of international peace and security."

Gregorian had a reputation for his fundraising skills. The Financial Times wrote in 2007 that he has been "hailed as a fund-raising genius." Gregorian commented, "I don't mind raising money—for a cause, not for me. At the same time, never appealing to the vanity of people, but appealing to their civic duty." He also argued that he is "not an ideologue — I don't ask people to give to ideological causes."

An elementary school in Fox Point, Providence, Rhode Island, is named after Gregorian. In 2009 he said that he took great pride in that fact. "It has become a great school. I've helped them personally", he added.

=== Awards and honors ===
The Financial Times wrote in 2007 that Gregorian had received "39 awards, six international decorations, 14 civic honours and 16 prestigious medals." These include:

- Guggenheim Fellowship in Russian History, 1971
- Elected to the American Philosophical Society, 1985
- Ellis Island Medal of Honor, 1986
- Golden Plate Award of the American Academy of Achievement, 1989
- Elected to the American Academy of Arts and Sciences, 1989
- American Academy of Arts and Letters Award for Distinguished Service to the Arts, 1989
- Ordre des Arts et des Lettres Officier (France), 1995
- Order of Prince Henry Grand Officer (Portugal), 1995
- National Humanities Medal, 1998, presented by President Bill Clinton
- American Library Association Honorary Membership-2000
- Presidential Medal of Freedom, 2004, presented by President George W. Bush
- French Legion of Honor Chevalier, 2017
- Carnegie Hall Medal of Excellence, 2019 (presented by New York City Mayor Michael Bloomberg)
- Institute of International Education, Stephen P. Duggan Award for Mutual Understanding, 2019

=== Honorary degrees ===
As of 2001, Gregorian had received around 50 honorary degrees, 60 by 2007, and "nearly seventy" by 2015. These include from:

Honorary degrees awarded to Vartan Gregorian
| School | Year | Degree |
|---|---|---|
| Boston University | 1983 | — |
| Brown University | 1984 | Doctor of Humane Letters (L.H.D.) |
| Jewish Theological Seminary | 1984 | — |
| State University of New York | 1985 | — |
| Connecticut College | 1985 | — |
| SUNY Potsdam | 1985 | Doctor of Letters |
| College of Mount Saint Vincent | 1986 | Doctor of Humane Letters |
| Johns Hopkins University | 1987 | Doctor of Humane Letters (L.H.D.) |
| New York University | 1987 | — |
| University of Pennsylvania | 1988 | — |
| Dartmouth College | 1989 | |
| Rutgers University | 1989 | Doctor of Laws |
| Dickinson College | 1989 | Doctor of Letters |
| Wheaton College (Massachusetts) | 1989 | — |
| City University of New York | 1990 | — |
| University of Missouri | 1991 | Doctor of Literature |
| Long Island University | 1993 | — |
| Tufts University | 1994 | L.H.D. |
| University of Aberdeen | 1999 | LLD |
| Muhlenberg College | 2000 | Doctor of Humanities |
| University of Illinois Urbana-Champaign | 2001 | Doctor of Humane Letters |
| Pennsylvania State University | 2003 | Doctor of Humane Letters |
| Lafayette College | 2003 | — |
| Fordham University | 2003 | Doctor of Humane Letters |
| California State University; San Francisco State University | 2004 | Doctor of Humane Letters |
| American University of Beirut | 2004 | Doctor of Humane Letters |
| College of Charleston | 2004 | Doctor of Humane Letters |
| University of Notre Dame | 2005 | Doctor of Laws |
| University of Southern California | 2006 | Doctor of Humane Letters |
| Keio University | 2008 | Doctor of Philosophy |
| University of Miami | 2009 | Doctor of Humane Letters |
| University of St Andrews | 2009 | Doctor of Letters |
| University of Edinburgh | 2009-10 | — |
| Northeastern University | 2010 | Doctor of Humane Letters |
| Brandeis University | 2013 | Doctor of Humane Letters |
| Pace University | 2013 | — |
| Adelphi University | 2015 | Doctor of Humane Letters |
| University of South Carolina | 2017 | Doctor of Letters |

== Bibliography ==
- Gregorian, Vartan, ed. (1962). Hin tghter nor patmutian hamar [Old papers for the new history] (in Armenian). Beirut. (Note: Concerning Simon Vratzian.)
- (ed). Simon Vratzian, Kianki Oughinerov [memoirs], Volume 5, (Beirut, 1966)
- "Mahmud Tarzi and Saraj-ol-Akhbar: Ideology of Nationalism and Modernization in Afghanistan". Middle East Journal. 21 (3): 345–368. Summer 1967. JSTOR 4324163.
- The Emergence of Modern Afghanistan: Politics of Reform and Modernization, 1880-1946 (Stanford University Press, 1969)
- Gregorian, Vartan (1974). "Minorities of Isfahan: the Armenian community of Isfahan 1587-1722". Iranian Studies. 7 (3/4): 652–680. doi:10.1080/00210867408701483. JSTOR 4310181.
- Gregorian, Vartan (1985). "The Book, the Library, Literacy". Public Library Quarterly. 6 (1): 13–16. doi:10.1300/J118v06n01_04.
- (ed). Censorship: Five Hundred Years of Conflict (Oxford University Press, 1997)
- The Road to Home: My Life and Times [memoir] (Simon & Schuster, 2003)
- Islam : a mosaic, not a monolith. Brookings Institution Press. 2003.
- "The keys to the future : unlocking solutions to the challenges ahead". Carnegie Reporter. 6 (3): Inside front cover, 48–49. Fall 2011.
- "Preventing Afghanistan from becoming a narco-state" (PDF). Carnegie Reporter. 6 (4): Inside front cover, 49–51. Spring 2012.
- "Mentoring for the 21st Century". Carnegie Reporter. 7 (2): Inside front cover, 45. Summer 2013.
- "American higher education: an obligation to the future". Carnegie Reporter. 7 (3): Inside front cover, 85–87. Winter 2014.
- "Built to last". Carnegie Reporter. 11 (1): 2–6. Winter 2019.

=== Critical studies and reviews of Gregorian's work ===
The emergence of modern Afghanistan

Gregorian's first book, The Emergence of Modern Afghanistan: Politics of Reform and Modernization, 1880-1946, was published by Stanford University Press in 1969, "long before most Americans had any interest in or knowledge of that faraway country." It covered the history of Afghanistan from the 19th century until the end of World War II. It was based on his PhD thesis and research of eight years.

The book was widely praised by reviewers. Louis Dupree described it as "the best of its kind on Afghanistan [which] will be a basic source for years to come" and added, "In the past, all books written about Afghanistan had to be measured alongside Elphinstone's 1815 classic. We now have another yardstick: Gregorian, 1969." M. E. Yapp called it a "comprehensive and informative study" and the best general presentation for the period covered. Leon B. Poullada noted that "Until Gregorian came, Afghanistan has in some ways been a country in search of a scholar." Ludwig W. Adamec opined that Gregorian has written a "valuable book; but much remains to be done by him and others before the definitive story of Afghanistan's modernization can be told." Firuz Kazemzadeh noted that Gregorian "filled an enormous gap in our knowledge of the Middle East and has done it with exemplary diligence, intelligence, and verve. His book is far superior to any work on modern Afghanistan known to this reviewer." M. Jamil Hanifi wrote that it is a "major scholarly work, which should be considered as a most imperative reference work by students of Afghanistan in particular, and those interested in the history of Asia in general."

Islam : a mosaic, not a monolith

Gregorian's 2003 book Islam: A Mosaic, Not a Monolith was written, according to himself, in order to promote for better understanding of Islam. "We have to see what we have in common, as well as what divides us," he said in a later interview. Ebrahim Moosa noted that "it is an effort by a prominent American to coax decision-makers to take the complexity of religion seriously and a plea to avoid making flawed geopolitical analyses about Islam." The book received mixed reviews. Michael B. Schub wrote in the Middle East Quarterly that it is "well intentioned and disheartening" and that Gregorian "is by training an Afghan specialist-not a specialist on Islam. Unfortunately, it shows."

The road to home

Gregorian published his memoirs, entitled The Road to Home: My Life and Times, in 2003. In an interview, he noted that the book is a tribute to his grandmother and other people who played a crucial role in his life. He narrates his life, which has been described as a "rags-to-riches" story. He got the idea of the book when he was in hospital in 1999 and initially wanted to write about the "concept of an educated person, how it has changed from Renaissance to now." Gordon S. Wood wrote in The New York Review of Books that Gregorian is "the traditional American success story, modeled on that of Benjamin Franklin-the bright young boy who read book after book and rose out of nowhere to become one of America's preeminent citizens." Another reviewer called it "the quintessential American Success Story."

———————

Bibliography notes
