= Westcliff High School for Girls =

Location
- Kenilworth Gardens; Westcliff-on-Sea, Essex, SS0 0BS; England; 51.55242°N 0.66772°E

Information
- Type: Grammar school, academy
- Motto: Fide Et Fortitudine 'By faith and fortitude' (I force no friend, I fear no foe)
- Established: 1920 (founded); 1931 (moved to current premises)
- Local authority: Southend-on-Sea
- Department for Education URN: 136490 Tables
- Ofsted: Reports
- Headteacher: Emma Matthews
- Gender: Girls, mixed sixth form
- Age: 11 to 18
- Enrolment: 1050
- Houses: Bourchier; Mandeville; Bohun; Devereux
- Website: http://www.whsg.info/

Westcliff High School for Girls, also known by its initialism WHSG, is a selective grammar school and academy for girls in Southend-on-Sea, Essex and surrounding areas. It teaches students from the age of 11 through to 18 years old, and admission to the school is dependent upon their performance in selective 11+ tests set by the Consortium of Selective Schools in Essex (CSSE).

== Admissions ==
It caters for those between the ages of 11 and 18. It is next to Westcliff High School for Boys, with the two schools sharing a canteen, and is opposite St Thomas More High School for Boys. In Ofsted's 2010 report, it stated that there were 1,046 students on roll, 286 of which were in the sixth form. It also stated that "the large majority of students are of White British heritage. Many other ethnic groups are represented and the proportion of students from minority ethnic groups is similar to that found nationally. The proportion of students who speak English as an additional language is below that found nationally and all speak English fluently. Eligibility for free school meals is much lower than average. The number of students with special educational needs and/or disabilities is lower than average."

== History ==
The school was founded as "The Commercial School" alongside Westcliff High School for Boys in Victoria Avenue in 1920 and moved to its current premises in 1931.

It gained specialist status in science and engineering in 2003. The new English block was completed late 2009 and opened to pupils in the spring term of 2010. The new building has three floors and caters for English, Law, Psychology and other subjects. The school converted to academy status in 2011. In January 2014, Westcliff High School for Girls achieved second highest GCSE results in the whole of the UK.

== Academic performance ==
Westcliff is a very strong school academically, with 2014 GCSE results placing 2nd in the country. In 2006, the school achieved the 14th best A-Levels in the country as well.

Westcliff High School for Girls has been recognised by Ofsted as 'outstanding' (October 2010 inspection). In 2011, 100% of GCSE students achieved 5 or more A*–C grades in English and Maths.

== Houses ==
Students at Westcliff High School for Girls are split into four houses; Bohun, Mandeville, Bouchier, and Devereux, modelled upon a traditional house system. Competitiveness is actively encouraged between houses as the students contend to win House Championships. Students compete in sports, music, drama and other fields to establish the victor.

== Notable former pupils ==
- Catherine Bishop, silver medalist, coxless pairs, 2004 Olympic Games
- Alison Childs, Olympic diver, 1984 Los Angeles Olympic Games
- Nathalie Emmanuel, actress
- Pam Hobbs, author
- Judith Kingston, paediatric oncologist
- Jack Monroe, journalist and campaigner
- Annabel Port, radio broadcaster
- Jane Root, Controller from 1999-2004 of BBC Two (its first female controller), responsible for commissioning The Naked Chef with Jamie Oliver
- Clare Walton, Air Marshal
