= Judith Kingston =

English paediatric oncologist

Judith Eve Kingston (24 April 1949 – 24 January 2016) was an English paediatric oncologist best known for pioneering the use of chemotherapy in the treatment of the retinoblastoma form of cancer.

== Biography ==
Kingston was born on 24 April 1949 to Edward Norman Kingston and Evelyn Grace Kingston. She grew up on her family's farm in Essex, attending primary school in Rayleigh and later Westcliff High School for Girls. She studied biochemistry and then medicine at Bristol University, receiving a BSc in 1970 and an MB ChB in 1973. She trained as a paediatrician at the Bristol Royal Infirmary in Bristol and Addenbrooke's Hospital in Cambridge.

Kingston worked at the University of Oxford as a clinical research fellow from 1980 to 1983. In 1983, she was appointed honorary consultant and senior lecturer at St Bartholomew's Hospital in London. There, she treated children with leukaemia and retinoblastoma, a cancer of the eye. She pioneered the use of chemotherapy as a first-line treatment for children with retinoblastoma; her collaborator John Hungerford, an ophthalmologist, wrote that "The world of expertise in retinoblastoma is totally agreed that Judith's contribution has been paramount to the current world wide treatment of this tumour in thousands of children worldwide."

Kingston was elected Fellow of the Royal College of Physicians in 1991 and Fellow of the Royal College of Paediatrics and Child Health in 1997. She joined Great Ormond Street Hospital's haematology and oncology department in 2004, and continued seeing patients at the Royal London Hospital, where she directed the retinoblastoma unit. She planned to retire in 2017, but died suddenly from sepsis on 24 January 2016. In 2017, the retinoblastoma unit of the Barts Health NHS Trust was renamed the Judith Kingston Retinoblastoma Unit.
