= Sverre Holmsen =

Swedish writer (1906–1992)

Sverre Holmsen (1906–1992) was a Swedish writer born in Transvaal, South Africa, and brought up in Norway and Sweden. He became a Swedish citizen 1912.

In 1945 he married the artist and writer Agda Göthlin. He was previously married to Margit Holm in 1928. From 1922 he travelled and worked around the world and was a supporter of global unity.

The main part of his books draws inspiration from Polynesia. Sverre Holmsen lived in Tahiti for several years. Holmsen was an early environmentalist. In the main part of his works he points out the dangers of modern ways of living. Even in his earliest works he expressed critical views about technical development and the exploitation of natural resources.

Seventeen of his books have been published in Swedish and have been translated into 12 languages.

He is the older brother of Egil Holmsen, Swedish film director, screenwriter, journalist, author and actor.

== Books ==
- 1949 "Polynesian Trade Wind" London, J.Barrie.
- 1951 "Singing Coral". London. J.Barrie.
- 1952 "The Island beyond the Horizon" London, J. Barrie.
- 1961 "Globen runt" ( in Swedish)
- 1966 "Morialand" (in Swedish)
- 1969 "De upplysta horisonterna" (in Swedish)

== See also ==
- Swedish literature
