= Deltina Hay =

American author, publisher, web developer and social media expert

- Born: December 19, 1960 (age 65); Fairbanks, Alaska
- Education: M.A. in Counseling Psychology; ABT M.S. in Applied Mathematics and Computer Science; B.S. in Management Information Systems
- Alma mater: St. Edward's University
- Occupations: Author; professor; lecturer
- Organization(s): Independent Book Publishers Association; International Marketing Standards Board
- Known for: Web 2.0
- Website: deltina.com

Deltina Hay (born 1960) is an American author, web developer and the author of books involving search engine optimization and marketing tactics. She serves as a board member for the Independent Book Publishers Association where she is an invited board member of the Internet Marketing Standards Board. She has been considered a pioneer of Web 2.0.

== Early life and education ==
Hay was born on December 19, 1960, in Fairbanks, Alaska, and raised in the remote fishing town of Haines, Alaska. She attended the University of Alaska in Juneau, where she was awarded a Bachelor of Science in Management Information Systems in 1987. She earned her Master of Science in Applied Mathematics and Computer Science from Oregon State University in 1994. Hay completed her Master of Arts in 2006 when she received her degree in Counselling Psychology from St. Edward's University in Austin, Texas.

== Career ==
Hay is a professor at Drury University, where she teaches courses on Web 2.0 and social media courses. Hay is the author of four books. She contributed to online publications Technorati, SocialMedia.biz, and Six Revisions. Hay was a major contributor to the IBPA's Publishing University 2009 BookExpo America held in New York City.

She was also the founder and principal of Dalton Publishing, a publishing company that specialized in poetry and contemporary literature. Dalton Publishing has published nearly 20 books. Dalton Publishing returned all book rights to its authors in 2012 and ceased operation. Hay started two blog sites: Social Media Power and Mobile Web Slinger. Hay is also the founder of Plumb Web Solutions.

== Bibliography ==
- A Survival Guide to Social Media and Web 2.0 Optimization: Strategies, Tactics, and Tools for Succeeding in the Social Web (2009) ISBN 978-0981744384
- The Social Media Survival Guide: Strategies, Tactics, and Tools for Succeeding in the Social Web (2011) ISBN 978-1884995705
- The Bootstrapper's Guide to the Mobile Web: Practical Plans to Get Your Business Mobile in Just a Few Days for Just a Few Bucks (2012) ISBN 978-1610350525
- The Bootstrapper's Guide to the New Search Optimization: Mastering the New Rules of Organic Search Using Relevancy, Context, and Semantics (2013) ISBN 978-1610351553
