= Han Su-yeong =

South Korean writer (born 1967)

- Born: 1967 (age 58–59); Imsil County, North Jeolla Province, South Korea
- Occupations: Novelist; short story writer

Han Su-yeong (born 1967) is a South Korean writer. Her works have repeated images representing verticality such as falling, a roof, a bird’s eye view or bungee jumping. In her writings, the poor and sick people seek for a way to go up and to be recovered but they only face tragic outcomes because they cannot go against the reality where power flows from top to bottom. She tries to explore what causes pain by illustrating in detail the situations these people encounter. She is the recipient of the Writer of the Year by Mineumsa and the New Writer's Award of Joongang Ilbo.

== Life ==
She was born in 1967 in Imsil County, North Jeolla Province and originally named Han Sun-yeong. She graduated from Duksung Women's University, majoring in pharmaceutical sciences. She neither took any literary class nor participated in any literary group until 2001 when she started learning how to write at a literary center. She debuted in a year of studying literature in 2002, as her short story, "Nabi (나비 Butterfly)," was selected by Joongang Ilbo. She was awarded the Writer of the Year by Mineumsa with "Gongheoui 1/4 (공허의 1/4 A Fourth of Emptiness)" in 2004.

== Style and themes ==
=== Pain of the sick and the poor ===
As she reveals her intention of "writing for people who are poor, lonely and distressed," Han's novels often deal with poor and misfortunate people. Her first short story, Butterfly, has a young narrator who lives with her mother and grandmother. Her mother leaves home because her grandmother keeps stealing but her mother has to support her grandmother after all. "My" family is poor and "my" mother and grandmother are sick. Butterfly contains fantastical aspects described through the girl's imagination while it also provides factuality through simple but precise descriptions.

The narrator of “1/4 A Fourth of Emptiness” works at the management office of an apartment complex to support her sick family. Suffering from rheumatism herself, she dreams of going to the Rub' al Khali, the sand desert in the Arabian Peninsula, where she believes her illness would be cured. Under poverty and sickness, she has no other choice but to jump to her own death while imagining the Rub' al Khali desert. By comparing the damp, soggy reality to the dry, hot desert, this story describes a painful life of sick people from a keen perspective.

Joeui dubeonjjae jido (조의 두 번째 지도 Joe’s Second Map) (2013) describes how "Joe" ends up jumping to his death after suffering from poverty since he was a kid in a privileged neighborhood. The narrator of this novel is a pigeon who witnesses Joe jumping. Joe's plunging to his death was a way to find an exit from the isolation he has faced. This novel shows how insecure a life becomes in the modern society through his jumping and people who are affected by his death.

=== Issues of immigrant women ===
Geunyeoui namu pingguari (그녀의 나무 핑궈리 Her Apple Pear Tree) is a story about "Manja" who is an immigrant woman from Yeonbyeon who was married to a Korean man. But the narrator is Manja"s dog. She wants to live a happy life but what she faces instead is arduous labor, her husband's infidelity, violation and infertility. In a novel, Peulutoui jibung (플루토의 지붕 Pluto's Roof) (2010), there are characters named Delilah who is a Filipina immigrant, and her son, Mansu. After she has suffered from her husband's verbal abuse, she gets divorced. Unlike the story of Her Apple Pear Tree that consists of distress situations immigrants may experience, Pluto's Roof breaks the hierarchical order between immigrants and native Koreans through the scenes where Delilah accepts the proposal of the "uncle" and their happy wedding feast.

=== Desire and hypocrisy ===
In Natjam (낮잠 Nap) (2019), the protagonists, Han Sangoh and Lee Hyunu, meet after 23 years and get involved in a mysterious event. The two became close friends back in high school because of their hatred toward their fathers but they belonged to a different social status. This novel uses the theme of desire and hypocrisy, and atonement and redemption that are revealed through their secret confession.

== Selected works ==
=== Short story collections ===
- 《공허의 1/4》, 민음사, 2004 / Gongheoui 1/4 (A Fourth of Emptiness), Mineumsa, 2004.
- 《그녀의 나무 핑궈리》, 민음사, 2006 / Geunyeoui namu pingguari (Her Apple Pear Tree), Mineumsa, 2006.

=== Novels ===
- 《플루토의 지붕》, 문학동네, 2010 / Peulutoui jibung (Pluto's Roof), Munhakdongne, 2010
- 《조의 두 번째 지도》, 실천문학사, 2013 / Joeui dubeonjjae jido (Joe's Second Map), Literature and Practice, 2013.
- 《낮잠》, 강, 2019 / Natjam (Nap), Gang, 2019.

=== Bookazine ===
- 〈지금 어디쯤이예요?〉 (윤후명, 조갑상, 이상섭 외, 《불안한 현재, 더 불안한 미래 - 불안의 정체를 찾아 나선 여덟 편의 신작 소설》, 도요, 2013.) / "Jigeum eodijjeumieyo? (Where Are You by Now?)," Bulanhan hyeonjae, deobulanhan mirae (Unstable Present, More Unstable Future), Doyo, 2013.
- 〈마할의 여름〉 (김태호, 문부일, 박하익 외, 《아무것도 모르면서-바일라》, 서유재, 2018.) / "Mahaleui yeoreum (Summer of Mahal)" Amugeotdo moreumyeonseo (Baila - You Don't Know Anything), Seoyujae, 2018.

== Awards ==
- 2004, Writer of the Year by Mineumsa with "Gongheoui 1/4 (공허의 1/4 A Fourth of Emptiness)"
- 2002, New Writer's Award of Joongang Ilbo ("Butterfly")
