= Stefmerie Halstead =

Stefmerie Halstead, sometimes credited as Stefanie Halstead, is an American actress and writer. She is known for her work in Fool's Gold, Roadside Massacre, and The Ape.

== Biography ==
Stefmerie received her education in ballet from Boston Ballet.

In April 2018, she received an award for her role in UndercoverUp.

== Filmography ==
- Fool's Gold (2005)
- The Ape (2005)
- Venous Red (2009)
- Southbound Heist (2011)
- My San Joaquin (2011)
- Roadside Massacre (2012)
- Hollywood Road Trip (2015)
- Moment of Anger (2016)
- UndercoverUp (2018)
- The Gallows Act II (2019)
- The Fruit (2019)

== Bibliography ==
- Halstead, Stefmerie (2021). The Night of the Festival
- Halstead, Stefmerie (2021). The Clock Rings The Town To Sleep

== Awards ==
- Best Horror Screenplay, Action On Film International Film Festival (2012)
- Best Female Filmmaker, Action On Film International Film Festival (2013)
