= Lynn Huggins-Cooper =

English author, academic

- Born: 1 November 1964 (age 61); Brighton, Sussex, England
- Occupations: Novelist, nonfiction writer

Lynn Huggins-Cooper (born 1 November 1964) is an English author. She has written more than 200 books and is best known for her many children's books including ‘One Boy’s War' published by Frances Lincoln and her Young Adult novel 'Walking with Witches’ for Tyne Bridge Publishing, which was illustrated by Nigel J Brewis. Under the pseudonym 'B.Strange' she also wrote 'Too Ghoul for School' ’ novels including 'Ghoul Dinners' and 'The Inspectres Call.'

She is a Regional Organiser for the Society of Children's Book Writers and Illustrators (SCBWI).

She teaches on the BA(Hons) Creative Writing at Falmouth University.

== Concepts ==
Downshift to the Good Life promotes self sufficiency, de-cluttering, simplification, and sustainable or green living (including recycling and organic gardening). The book has been featured in the press.

== Life ==
Huggins-Cooper lived for many years on a farm in County Durham. She married her writer husband Tom in 2011 and now lives next to 900 acres of woodland.
