= Henrietta Hardy Hammond =

American novelist (1854–1883)

- Born: Henrietta Hardy; August 13, 1854; Petersburgh, Virginia, United States
- Died: November 24, 1883 (aged 29); New York, New York, United States
- Occupation: Writer
- Writing career
- Pen name: Lou Capsadell; Henri Daugé

Henrietta Hardy Hammond (August 13, 1854 – November 24, 1883) was an American novelist and nonfiction writer who published anonymously and under the pen names Lou Capsadell and Henri Daugé. Her fiction included Her Waiting Heart (1875), The Georgians: A Story of Southern Life (1881), and A Fair Philosopher (1882); she also wrote about beauty tips for women and the process of silk production.

== Early life and education ==
Hammond was born Henrietta Hardy on August 13, 1854, in Petersburg, Virginia, to Henry C. and Huldah E. (Dozier) Hardy. In 1871, she graduated from the Virginia Female Institute in Staunton, Virginia. Hammond graduated with honors, winning a prize for writing an essay on the topic of "The Ocean in All Its Aspects."

== Career ==
Writing as Henri Daugé, Hammond contributed to Harper's Magazine, the New York Independent, and other periodicals. Her first novel, Her Waiting Heart, was published in 1875. A reviewer in The Saturday Review criticized the novel as sentimental and conventional. However, the title was released simultaneously in book form and as a serial in the Weekly Story-Teller, and sold well.

The Georgians: A Story of Southern Life (1881) was third in a series of novels published anonymously by various authors in a "round robin," a common publishing approach of that era. It depicts the relationship between Félise Orlanoff, a married French countess who inherits an estate in Georgia, and Marcus Laurens, a Southern lawyer. Jane Turner Censer identifies Hammond as one of a number of popular Southern novelists of the 1870s and 1880s who wrote about self-confident and self-sufficient heroines.

In Hammond's last novel, A Fair Philosopher (1882), her heroine Drosée starts a philosophy reading group while supporting her family. Contemporary reviews criticized the novel for weak characterization and a slow plot. However, another critic praised its sense of place and depiction of intellectual life.

Hammond also wrote nonfiction. Women's Secrets, or How to be Beautiful was published in 1876. The title page described the work as "translated and edited from the Persian and French, with additions from the best English authorities." The Complete Guide to Silk Culture (1883), an introduction to sericulture, is attributed to Hammond writing under the name L. Capsadell. In 1882, The New York Times listed L. Capsadell as the secretary of the New York Silk Exchange.

Hammond married Edward Hammond, a lawyer from Atlanta, Georgia, on December 10, 1878, in Brooklyn, New York. She died on November 24, 1883, in New York City.

== Bibliography ==
=== Novels ===
- Her Waiting Heart (1875) published as Lou Capsadell, New York: Authors' Publishing Company.
- The Georgians: A Story of Southern Life (1881) published as anonymous, Boston: James R. Osgood & Co.
- A Fair Philosopher (1882) published as Henri Daugé, New York: George W. Harlan & Co.

=== Non-fiction ===
- Women's Secrets, or How to be Beautiful (1876) published as Lou Capsadell, New York: Authors' Publishing Co.
- The Complete Guide to Silk Culture (1883) published as L. Capsadell, New York: W. B. Smith and Co.
