= Barlow Der Mugrdechian =

American historian

Barlow Der Mugrdechian (Armenian: Պարլօ Տէր-Մկրտիչեան;) is an associate Professor in the Armenian Studies Program at California State University, Fresno, where he teaches Armenian language, art, literature, history, and culture courses. His main area of research has been Armenian literature. He serves as the Berberian Coordinator of the Armenian Studies Program and the Director of the Center for Armenian Studies. He has published numerous articles on Armenian history, culture, and literature in many academic and professional journals worldwide.

== Life and career ==
Of Armenian descent, Der Mugrdechian was born in Fresno, California. He received his B.A. degree in biology at California State University, Fresno. He continued his education and received his M.A. degree and C. Phil. degree in Armenian language and literature in the Department of Near Eastern Languages and Culture at the University of California, Los Angeles. Der Mugrdechian began teaching at California State University, Fresno in 1985. He teaches Armenian language, art, literature, history and culture courses. In 1991, Der Mugrdechian was instrumental in the establishment of the student exchange program between California State University, Fresno and Yerevan State University. Der Mugrdechian taught and directed (1996-1997) the Armenian Relief Society Summer Studies Program in Massachusetts.

Der Mugrdechian has organized and led ten student groups to Armenia: 1988, 1990, 2001, 2005, 2009, 2011, 2014, 2017, 2019, and 2023.

He was the chairman of the Armenian Community Council of the San Joaquin Valley from 1992 to 1995. He served on the St. Paul Armenian Church Parish Council (Fresno) (1993-1995; 1999-2000; 2007-2009; 2014-2015).

Der Mugrdechian has served on the Diocesan Council of the Western Diocese of the Armenian Church (2004-2008), and was elected Chairman in 2007. He has also served as Chair of the Diocesan Assembly of the Western Diocese (2003, 2018, 2019, 2024, 2025).

Der Mugrdechian has served as President of the Society for Armenian Studies for three terms-2001-2004 and 2015-2017, and 2025 to the present. From 1997 to 2003, Der Mugrdechian edited the Newsletter of the Society for Armenian Studies, which is published three times a year. In 1996-1997 he hosted a television program about Armenian issues and history called Hye Talk. In September 1999, he served as a delegate to the National Ecclesiastical Assembly of Etchmiadzin. He also participated in the election of Karekin II as Catholicos of All Armenians.

Barlow Der Mugrdechian has traveled extensively in the Middle East and Armenia and is fluent in Armenian (both Classical and Modern), and has a reading knowledge of Russian, Turkish, and French.

== Recognition and awards ==
- Der Mugrdechian was the recipient of the "Aurora Mardiganian" award in 2023 by the Armenian Genocide Museum-Institute in Yerevan, Armenia.
- Der Mugrdechian was honored as the "Man of the Year" by the Knights and Daughters of Vartan at a Banquet on March 30, 2019. The award was in recognition of his leadership of the Armenian Studies Program and for his service to the Armenian community.
- In September 2010, Karekin II, Catholicos of All Armenians, bestowed the St. Nerses Shnorhali medal on Der Mugrdechian for his service to the Armenian Church.
- In 1995-1996 Der Mugrdechian was the recipient of the Provost's Award for Excellency in Teaching (1996).
- He was awarded an honorary doctorate degree in 2000 from Yerevan State University.

== Works ==
- "Anooshavan: The Intrepid Survivor" (Fresno, CA, 1995) by Bob Der Mugrdechian. Edited by Barlow Der Mugrdechian.
- General editor, The Armenian Series of The Press at California State University, Fresno (2008-present)
- "The Committee of Union and Progress: Founders, Ideology, and Structure," co-edited by Barlow Der Mugrdechian, Ümit Kurt, Ara Sarafian (Fresno, CA: The Press at California State University, Fresno, 2021) (157 pages) (Volume 13 in the Armenian Series)
- "Captive Nights: From the Bosphorus to Gallipoli with Zabel Yessayan" tr. G. M. Goshgarian, co-edited by Nanor Kebranian and Barlow Der Mugrdechian (Fresno, CA: The Press at California State University, Fresno, 2021) (74 pages) (Volume 14 in the Armenian Series)
- "Armenian-American Sketches," by Bedros Keljik, tr. Christopher Atamian, co-edited by Lou Ann Matossian and Barlow Der Mugrdechian (Fresno, CA: The Press at California State University, Fresno, 2019) (195 pages) (Volume 8 in the Armenian Series)
- "Western Armenian in the 21st Century: Challenges and New Approaches," co-edited by Bedross Der Matossian and Barlow Der Mugrdechian (Fresno, CA: The Press at California State University, Fresno, 2019) (152 pp.) (Volume 7 in the Armenian Series)
- "David of Sassoun: Critical Studies on the Armenian Epic" (Fresno, CA: The Press at California State University, Fresno, 2013) (209pp.)
- A Festschrift, "Between Paris and Fresno: Armenian Studies in Honor of Dickran Kouymjian" (Costa Mesa, CA: Mazda Press, 2008) (761pp.)
- "The Armenian Bible: a symposium celebrating the 1600th anniversary of the discovery of the Armenian alphabet and the translation of the Bible into Armenian" (Burbank, CA: Western Diocese of the Armenian Church, 2007)
