= Egil Holmsen =

Swedish film director, screenwriter, journalist, author and actor (1917–1990)

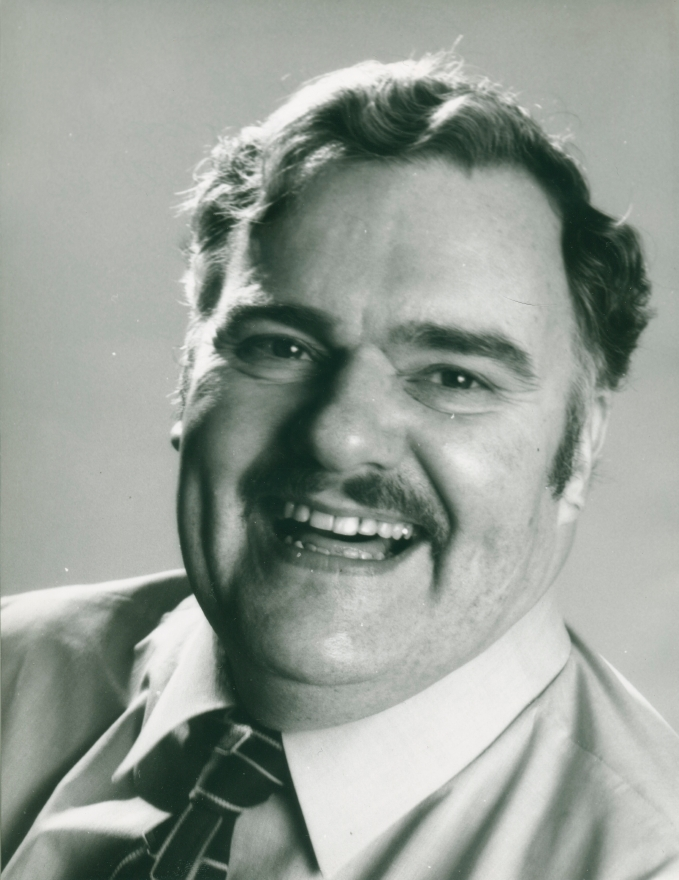
- Born: February 15, 1917
- Died: May 30, 1990 (aged 73)
- Occupations: Actor; director; screenwriter; author; journalist
- Years active: 1941-1985
- Relatives: Sverre Holmsen (brother)

Egil Sophus Severen Holmsen (February 15, 1917 – May 30, 1990) was a Swedish film director, screenwriter, journalist, author and actor. He was the younger brother of author Sverre Holmsen.

== Career ==
Holmsen initially worked as a journalist until he transitioned into the film industry as an actor. He debuted in Alf Sjöberg's Home from Babylon in 1941. He continued to work as an actor during the 1940s, until he began to direct and write scrips for various major production companies. In 1947, he debuted as a director with The Battle for the Coffee and as a screenwriter with City in the South. Holmsen followed with three coming-of-age films in the 1950s, Dangerous Curve in 1952, followed by Marianne and Speedfever in 1953. All three films depicted young teenagers in the criminal underworld of Stockholm.

Holmsen was heavily criticized after the release of Marianne, as it explored themes considered taboo at the time such as teenage sex, drugs and lesbian love. His next film Speedfever was also panned as it depicted crime and gay prostitution, which also caused it to be heavily censored. Holmsen's spree of controversial films did not end, as his following film, The Horse Handler's Girls, contained a provocative end scene featuring incest. It was his last feature film as a director.

During the 1950s to the 1970s, Holmsen continued writing scripts, particularly for several housewife films. Holmsen then revived his acting career in 1972 starring in the adult film Swedish Wildcats. He later starred in Champagne Gallop (1975), The Brothers Lionheart (1977), Dante - watch out for the Shark! (1978) and the TV show Stakeout (1983), which became his last role.

Holmsen began to write novels in the 1980s. His bibliography comprises Explosives (1981), Inheritance (1982) and In Goddesses Womb (1985).

== Filmography ==
=== As an actor ===
Year	English Title	Swedish Title	Role
1941	Home from Babylon	Hem från Babylon	
1941	Miss Wildcat	Fröken Vildkatt	Man at Thomas' birthday party
1942	The Stationmaster at Lyckås	Stinsen på Lyckås	John
1942	Sun Over Klara	Sol över Klara	Troublemaker
1942	One Does Not Forget	Man glömmer ingenting	Art school student
1942	Bleeding Hearts	Löjtnantshjärtan	Johan Blom
1942	A Trallande Lass	En trallande jänta	Editor Lundberg
1942	Doctor Glas	Doktor Glas	Student
1942	It Is My Music	Det är min musik	Party guest
1942	Life in the Country	Livet på landet	Young man
1944	A Daughter Born	En dotter född	Johnny, young man
1945	Girls in Port	Flickor i hamn	Third mate
1972	Swedish Wildcats	Swedish Wildcats	
1975	What the Swedish Butler Saw	Champagnegalopp	
1977	The Brothers Lionheart	Bröderna Lejonhjärta	Tengil's man
1978	Dante - Watch out for the Shark	Dante - akta're för Hajen!	Police officer
1983	Stakeout (TV series)	Spanarna	Alvar Bergholm

=== As a director ===
Year	English Title	Swedish Title
1948	The Textile Workers	Textilarna
1952	Dangerous Curve	Farlig kurva
1953	Marianne	Marianne
1953	Speed Fever	Fartfeber
1954	Time of Desire	Hästhandlarens flickor

=== As a screenwriter ===
Year	English Title	Swedish Title
1952	Dangerous Curve	Farlig kurva
1953	Speed Fever	Fartfeber
1971	What are they doing in the bank?	Va' har dom för sej i banken?
