= M. Jamil Hanifi =

Mohammed Jamil Hanifi (27 June 1935, in Sorkhab, Afghanistan) is the author of several books and has contributed numerous anthropology articles.

Hanifi received his Master's degree from Michigan State University, and his Ph.D. from Southern Illinois University, Carbondale.

Hanifi was a faculty member at Northern Illinois University and under consideration for the chairmanship of the Department of Anthropology when allegations of plagiarism in his dissertation surfaced. He wound up resigning from the university. He was affiliated with the Department of Anthropology at Michigan State University since 1990.
