= Pam Hobbs =

English travel writer and author (born 1929/1930)

Pam Hobbs (born 1929/1930) is an English travel writer and author.

== Life and work ==
Hobbs is the youngest of seven daughters born in 1929 to Edie and Jack Hobbs in Leigh-on-Sea, Essex, in southern England. She has written about her experience of evacuation as a child.

Hobbs emigrated to Canada in 1950. To celebrate Canada's centennial year in 1967, she and her husband and young children started exploring their adoptive country in a camper van, eventually travelling between the Atlantic, Pacific and Arctic Oceans. Hobbs' travel stories based on these family adventures were published in Toronto newspapers.

For the following 19 years, she travelled the world, writing a minimum of 40 travel articles per year for The Globe and Mail. Since then, she has contributed illustrated travel stories to many of North America's foremost newspapers and magazines, has appeared on radio and television, and has written or co-authored six travel-related books.

Hobbs and her husband live in Toronto's Beach district.

== Bibliography ==
- The Adventure Guide to Canada, 1991
- Free to Travel, 1993 (with Michael Algar)
- Visitors' Guide to Canada, 1994
- Pam Hobbs' Britain,1995
- Off the Beaten Track, Western Canada, 1995 (with Joanna Ebbutt and Michael Algar)
- Off the Beaten Track, Eastern Canada, 1995 (with Joanna Ebbutt and Michael Algar)
- Don't Forget to Write: the true story of an evacuee and her family, 2002
- BRITAIN, Best of the Best, 2013

== Awards ==
- North American Travel Journalist Association - (Gold) 2006 and 2008
- Association of National Tourist Representatives, Canada, - (Writer of the Year) 2004, 2005, 2006 and 2007
- Mature Media - 2005 (2 gold awards), 2006 (2 gold awards)
