= List of writers by name: B =

The following is a List of writers by name whose last names begin with B:

Abbreviations: ch = children's; d = drama, screenwriting; f = fiction; nf = non-fiction; p = poetry, song lyrics

== Ba–BB ==
- Amadou Hampâté Bâ (1900/1901–1991, Mali/Ivory Coast, nf)
- Ba Jin (巴金, 1904–2005, China, f/nf), pseudonym of Li Yaotang
- Mariama Bâ (1929–1981, Senegal/France, f/nf)
- A. C. Baantjer (1923–2010, Netherlands, f)
- Gerzel Baazov (1904–1938, Russian E/USSR, p/d)
- Bolu Babalola (born 1991, England, f/d)
- Rotimi Babatunde (living, Nigeria, p/f/d)
- Charles Babbage (1791–1871, England, nf)
- Natalie Babbitt (1932–2016, US, ch)
- Dragan Babić (1937–2013, Yugoslavia/Serbia, nf)
- Gregory Victor Babic (1963–2013, Australia, nf/f)
- Sava Babić (1934–2012, Yugoslavia/Serbia, nf)
- Gervase Babington (1549/1550–1610, England, nf)
- Mihály Babits (1883–1941, Hungary, p/f/nf)
- Gabriela Babnik (born 1979, Yugoslavia/Slovenia, f)
- Ken Babstock (born 1970, Canada, p)
- Jimmy Santiago Baca (born 1952, US, p/nf/d)
- Riccardo Bacchelli (1891–1985, Italy, f)
- Bacchylides (c. 518 – c. 451 BCE, Greece, p)
- Hachemi Baccouche (1916–2008, Tunisia, nf)
- Bellamy Bach (group pseudonym, fl. 1980s, US, f/p)
- Richard Bach (born 1936, US, f)
- Harivansh Rai Bachchan (1907–2003, India, p), born Harivansh Rai Srivastava
- Joseph M. Bachelor (1887–1947, US, p)
- Simon Bacher (1823–1891, Hungary, p)
- Ingeborg Bachmann (1926–1973, Austria, p/d/f)
- Sutardji Calzoum Bachri (born 1941, Dutch East Indies/Indonesia, p)
- Camil Baciu (1926–2005, Romania/France, nf/f)
- Maria Baciu (born 1942, Romania, p/f/ch)
- Anne-Marie de Backer (1908–1987, France, p)
- Marijn Backer (born 1956, Netherlands, p/ch)
- Edmund Backhouse (1873–1944, England, nf)
- Elizabeth Backhouse (1917–2013, Australia, f/d)
- William Backhouse (1593–1662, England, nf)
- Fredrik Backman (born 1981, Sweden, f)
- Anne Bacon (1527 or 1528–1610, England, nf)
- Francis Bacon (1561–1626, England, nf)
- Phanuel Bacon (1700–1783, England, d/p)
- Anatol E. Baconsky (1925–1977, Romania, p/f/nf)
- John Baconthorpe (c. 1290–1347, England, nf), also known as Bacconius
- George Bacovia (1881–1957, Romania, p), pseudonym of Gheorghe Vasiliu
- Krzysztof Kamil Baczyński (1921–1944, Poland, p)
- John F. Baddeley (1854–1940, England, nf)
- David Baddiel (born 1964, England, f/nf/ch)
- Robert Baden-Powell, 1st Baron Baden-Powell (1857–1941, England/Kenya, nf)
- Van Badham (born 1974, Australia, d/f)
- Janet Badjan-Young (born 1937, Gambia, d)
- Adwoa Badoe (living, Ghana/Canada, f/nf)
- Yaba Badoe (born 1954, Ghana/England, nf)
- Amna Elsadik Badri (living, Sudan, nf)
- Hala El Badry (born 1954, Egypt, nf/f)
- Robert Bage (1730–1801, England, f)
- Walter Bagehot (1826–1887, England, nf)
- Julio Baghy (1891–1967, Hungary, p/f)
- Jean-Louis Baghio'o (1910–1994, Martinique/France, f/nf/p), pseudonym of Victor Jean-Louis
- Desmond Bagley (1923–1983, England, f)
- Enid Bagnold (1889–1981, England, p/f)
- Richard Bagot (1860–1921, England, f/nf)
- Elisaveta Bagryana (1893–1991, Bulgaria, p)
- Tilly Bagshawe (born 1973, England, f)
- Guru Tegh Bahadur (1621–1675, Mughal E, p/nf)
- Kul Bahadur KC (1946–2013, Nepal, p)
- Kerolos Bahgat (born 1991, Egypt, nf)
- Abdul Hamid Bahij (born 1979, Afghanistan/Germany, nf)
- Eric Bahloo (born 1964, Mauritius/France, nf)
- Eduardo Bähr (born 1940, Honduras, f/nf)
- Bai Juyi (白居易, 772–846, China, p)
- Mah Laqa Bai (1768–1824, India, p), born Chanda Bai
- Bai Renfu (白仁甫, c. 1226−1306, China, d)
- Bai Shouyi (白壽彝, 1909–2000, China, nf)
- Lothar Baier (1942–2004, Germany, f/nf)
- Jean-Antoine de Baïf (1532–1589, Venice/France, p)
- Grace Shattuck Bail (1898–1996, US, p)
- Murray Bail (born 1941, Australia, f/nf)
- Adrian Bailey (born 1945, England, nf)
- David Bailey (living, England, f/d/nf)
- H. C. Bailey (1878–1961, England, f)
- Hilary Bailey (1936–2017, England, f/nf)
- Nathan Bailey (died 1742, England, nf)
- Paul Bailey (born 1937, England, f/d)
- Philip James Bailey (1816–1902, England, p)
- Sarah Lord Bailey (1856–1922, England/US, nf)
- Allan Baillie (born 1943, Scotland/Australia, f/ch)
- Joanna Baillie (1762–1851, Scotland/England, p/d)
- Robert Baillie (1602–1662, Scotland, nf)
- Séry Bailly (1948–2018, Ivory Coast, nf/f)
- Alexander Bain (1818–1903, Scotland, nf)
- F. W. Bain (1863–1940, England/India, f)
- Beryl Bainbridge (1932–2010, England, f/nf)
- Doreen Baingana (born 1966, Uganda, f/ch/nf)
- Elizabeth-Irene Baitie (born 1970, Ghana, f/ch)
- Ibn Bajjah (died 1138, Morocco, nf/p), also known as Avempace
- József Bajza (1804–1858, Austria-Hungary, p/nf)
- Jozef Ignác Bajza (1755–1836, Austria-Hungary, f)
- Józef Baka (1706 or 1707–1780, Polish Lithuania, p)
- Latifa Baka (born 1964, Morocco, f)
- Vyt Bakaitis (born 1940, Lithuania/US, p)
- Djibo Bakary (1922–1998, Niger, nf)
- Bake Robert Tumuhaise (born 1981, Uganda, nf)
- Anne Baker (1914–2025, England, nf)
- David Baker (born 1954, US, p)
- Deb Baker (born 1953, US, f)
- Deborah Baker (living, US/India, nf)
- Denys Val Baker (1917–1984, Wales, f/nf)
- Henry Baker (1698–1774, England, nf)
- Hinemoana Baker (born 1968, N Zealand, p)
- James Robert Baker (1947–1997, US, f)
- Kage Baker (1952–2010, US, f)
- Kate Baker (1861–1953, Australia, nf)
- Louisa Alice Baker (1856–1926, N Zealand, f)
- Marina Baker (born 1967, England, ch)
- Samuel Baker (1821–1893, England, nf)
- Wasef Bakhtari (born 1942, Afghanistan/US, p/nf)
- Bâkî (1526–1600, Ottoman E, p), pseudonym of Mahmud Abdülbâkî
- Ljiljana Bakić (1939–2022, Yugoslavia/Serbia, nf)
- Khnata bent Bakkar (died 1754, Morocco, nf)
- R. Scott Bakker (born 1967, Canada, f)
- C. Johan Bakkes (born 1956, S Africa, nf)
- Christiaan Bakkes (born 1965, S Africa, nf)
- Margaret Bakkes (1931–2016, S Africa, f/nf)
- Stefano Bakonyi (1892–1969, Hungary/Italy, nf)
- Lujo Bakotić (1867–1941, Austrian E/Yugoslavia, nf)
- Peter Bakowski (born 1954, Australia, p)
- Salwa Bakr (born 1949, Egypt, f)
- Krishna Bhusan Bal (1948–2012, Nepal, p)
- Bob Balaban (born 1945, US, ch)
- John Balaban (born 1943, US, p)
- Judy Balaban (1932–2023, US, nf)
- Đorđe Balašević (1953–2021, Yugoslavia/Serbia, p)
- Bálint Balassi (1554–1594, Hungary, p)
- Rajeev Balasubramanyam (England, f)
- Béla Balázs (1884–1949, Hungary, nf/p)
- Julia Balbilla (72 CE – post–130, Roman E, p)
- Hieronymus Balbus (c1450 - c1535, Republic of Venice, nf/p)
- Edward Balcerzan (born 1937, Poland, nf/p)
- Nigel Balchin (1908–1970, England, f/nf/d)
- Betsy Balcombe (1802–1871, England, nf)
- David Baldacci (born 1960, US, f)
- Sirah Baldé (1929–2018, Guinea, f)
- Margaret Balderson (born 1935, Australia, ch)
- Kristín Marja Baldursdóttir (born 1949, Iceland, f)
- Faith Baldwin (1893–1978, US, f)
- James Baldwin (1924–1987, US, nf)
- John Bale (1495–1563, England/Ireland, nf)
- Stanisław Baliński (1898–1984, Poland, p/nf)
- Rabia Balkhi (10th c. CE, Afghanistan/Samanid E, p)
- Hugo Ball (1886–1927, Germany/Switzerland, p/nf)
- Jesse Ball (born 1978, US, f/p)
- Murray Ball (1939–2017, N Zealand, nf)
- Zsófia Balla (born 1949, Romania/Hungary, p/nf)
- Philippa Ballantine (born 1971, N Zealand, f)
- David Ballantyne (1924–1986, N Zealand, f/nf)
- R. M. Ballantyne (1825–1894, Scotland/England, f)
- J. G. Ballard (1930–2009, China/England, f/nf)
- Todhunter Ballard (1903–1980, US, f)
- Ishwor Ballav (1937–2008, Nepal, p)
- Blue Balliett (born 1955, US, ch)
- Addie L. Ballou (1838–1916, US, p/nf)
- Pedro Balmaceda (1868–1889, Chile, nf)
- Josephine Balmer (born 1959, England, p/nf)
- Konstantin Balmont (1867–1942, Russian E/USSR, p)
- Mary Balogh (born 1944, Wales/Canada, ch)
- J. P. V. D. Balsdon (1901–1977, England, nf)
- Honoré de Balzac (1799–1850, France, f)
- Samuel Bamford (1788–1872, England, nf/p)
- John Codrington Bampfylde (1754–1796/7, England, p)
- Ban Biao (班彪, 3–54 CE, China, nf)
- Ban Gu (班固, 32–92 CE, China, nf/p)
- Matija Ban (1818–1903, Austrian E/Serbia, p/d)
- Ban Zhao (班昭, c. 45/49 – 117/120 CE, China, nf)
- Zsófia Bán (born 1957, Brazil/Hungary, nf)
- Carmen-Francesca Banciu (born 1955, Romania, f/d)
- Richard Bancroft (1544–1610, England, nf)
- Ellen Banda-Aaku (born 1965, England/Zambia, f/ch)
- António Gonçalves de Bandarra (1500–1556, Portugal, nf/p)
- Biyi Bandele (1967–2022, Nigeria/England, f/d)
- Manuel Bandeira (1886–1968, Brazil, p/nf)
- Danica Bandić (1871–1950, Austria-Hungary/Serbia, f/d)
- Faith Bandler (1918–2015, Australia, nf)
- Manik Bandopadhyay (1908–1956, India, f)
- Bibhutibhushan Bandyopadhyay (1894–1950, India, f)
- Sharadindu Bandyopadhyay (1899–1970, India, f)
- Tarasankar Bandyopadhyay (1898–1971, India, f)
- Miklós Bánffy (1873–1950, Hungary, f/nf)
- Herman Bang (1857–1912, Denmark, f)
- Mary Jo Bang (born 1946, US, p)
- Odd Bang-Hansen (1908–1984, Norway, nf/f/ch)
- Bunmi Banjo (born 1977, Canada/Nigeria, nf)
- Zsuzsa Bánk (born 1965, Germany, f)
- Isabella Banks (1821–1897, England, f/p)
- Iain M. Banks (1954–2013, Scotland, f)
- Lynne Reid Banks (1929–2024, England, ch/f)
- Russell Banks (born 1940, US, f/p)
- Anne Bannerman (1765–1829, Scotland, p)
- Helen Bannerman (1862–1946, Scotland, ch)
- Lex Banning (1921–1965, Australia, p)
- Ann Bannon (born 1932, US, f)
- Shabbir Banoobhai (born 1949, S Africa, p)
- Bao Junhui (鮑君徽, late 8th c. CE, China, p)
- Bao Linghui (鲍令晖, fl. c. 464 CE, China, p)
- Bao Zhao (鮑照, c. 414–466, China, p/nf)
- Anni Baobei (安妮宝贝, born 1974, China, f), pseudonym of Li Jie (励婕)
- Reza Baraheni (1935–2022, Iran/Canada, f/p/nf)
- Amiri Baraka (1934–2014, US, p/d/f), birth name Everett LeRoi Jones
- Ibtisam Barakat (born 1963, Palestine, USA) author and poet (ابتسام بركات)
- Marcin Baran (born 1963, Poland, p/nf)
- Ivan Baran (1996, Croatia, f)
- Stanisław Barańczak (1946–2014, Poland, p/nf)
- Agnieszka Baranowska (1819–1890, Prussian Poland, d/p)
- Porfirio Barba-Jacob (1883–1942, Colombia, p/nf)
- Ermolao Barbaro (1454-1493, Republic of Venice, nf)
- Francesco Barbaro (1390-1454, Republic of Venice, nf)
- Giosafat Barbaro (1413-1494, Republic of Venice, nf)
- Anna Laetitia Barbauld (1743–1825, England, p/f/ch)
- Jorge Barbosa (1902–1971, Cape Verde/Portugal, p/nf)
- Alexander Barclay (c. 1476–1552, Scotland/England, p)
- Edwin Barclay (1882–1955, Liberia, nf)
- Janos Bardi (1923–1990, Hungary/Germany, f/nf/d)
- Théodore de Banville (1823–1891, France, p/nf)
- Ana de Sousa Baptista (born 1971, Portugal, p)
- Antanas Baranauskas (1835–1902, Russian E, p)
- Nikoloz Baratashvili (1817–1845, Russian E, p)
- Porfirio Barba-Jacob (1883–1942, Colombia, p/nf)
- Anna Laetitia Barbauld (1743–1825, England, p/nf/ch)
- Arlindo Barbeitos (1940–2021, Angola, p)
- W. N. P. Barbellion (1889–1919, England, nf)
- Margaret Barber (1869–1901, England, nf), pseudonym Michael Fairless
- Mary Barber (c. 1685 – c. 1755, Ireland/England, p)
- Ros Barber (born 1964, England, f/p)
- Shirley Barber (1935–2023, England/Australia, ch)
- Muriel Barbery (born 1969, France, f)
- Auguste Barbier (1805–1882, France, d/p)
- Eileen Barbosa (living, Cape Verde, f)
- John Barbour (c. 1320–1395, Scotland, p)
- Ralph Henry Barbour (1870–1944, US, ch)
- Eugen Barbu (1924–1993, Romania, f)
- Ion Barbu (1895–1961, Romania, nf/p), pseudonym of Dan Barbilian
- Alexander Barclay (c. 1476–1552, England, nf)
- Edwin Barclay (1882–1955, Liberia, nf/p)
- Florence L. Barclay (1862–1921, England, f)
- James Barclay (born 1965, England, f)
- Robert Barclay (1648–1690, England, nf)
- Janos Bardi (1923–1990, Hungary/Germany, f/nf)
- Michele Bardsley (born 1970, US, f)
- Leigh Bardugo, (born 1975, US, f)
- Burl Barer (born 1947, US, nf)
- John Baret (died 1580, England, nf)
- Giuseppe Marc'Antonio Baretti (1719–1789, Italy/England, nf]]
- Owen Barfield (1898–1997, England, nf/f/p)
- Serie Barford (living, N Zealand, p)
- Charles Foster Barham (1804–1884, England, nf)
- Debbie Barham (1976–2003, England, f)
- Richard Barham (1788–1845, England, f/p), pseudonym Thomas Ingoldsby
- Alessandro Baricco (born 1958, Italy, f/d)
- Maurice Baring (1874–1945, England, d/p/f)
- Sabine Baring-Gould (1834–1924, England, nf/f)
- René Barjavel (1911–1985, France, f/nf)
- Mehdi Ben Barka (1920 – post-1965, Morocco, nf)
- Mohammad Barkatullah (1898–1974, India/Bangladesh, nf)
- A. L. Barker (1918–2002, England, f)
- Cicely Mary Barker (1895–1973, England, nf)
- Clive Barker (born 1952, England, d/f)
- Dan Barker (born 1949, US, nf)
- Elspeth Barker (born 1940, Scotland/England, f/nf)
- George Barker (1913–1991, England, p)
- Jane Barker (1652–1732, England, f/p/nf)
- Juliet Barker (born 1958, England, nf)
- Les Barker (1947–2023, England, p)
- Mary Anne Barker (1831–1911, Jamaica/England, nf)
- Nicola Barker (born 1966, England/S Africa, f)
- Pat Barker (born 1943, England, f)
- Raffaella Barker (born 1964, England, f/ch)
- Sebastian Barker (1945–2014, England, f/nf)
- Joyce Barkhouse (1913–2012, Canada, ch)
- Jill Barklem (1951–2017, England, ch)
- Anna Barkova (1901–1976, Russia/USSR, p/nf/d)
- Coleman Barks (1937–2026, US, p)
- Clement Barksdale (1609–1687, England, nf)
- Mihály Barla (c. 1778–1824, Hungary, f/p)
- Ernst Barlach (1870–1938, Germany, nf)
- Fevziye Rahgozar Barlas (born 1955, Afghanistan/US, p/f)
- Jeffrey E. Barlough (born 1953, US, f/nf)
- Christopher Henry Muwanga Barlow (1929–2006, Uganda, p)
- Frank Barlow (1911–2009, England, nf)
- George Barlow (1847–1913 or 1914, England, p), pseudonym James Hinton
- Thomas Barlow (c. 1608–1691, England, nf)
- William Barlow (died 1613, England, nf)
- Kitty Barne (1882–1961, England, d/ch)
- Barnabe Barnes (c. 1571–1609, England, p)
- Lady Anne Barnard (1750–1825, Scotland/S Africa, nf/p)
- John Barnard (1628–1683, England, nf)
- Marjorie Barnard (1897–1987, Australia, f/nf)
- Mary Barnard (1909–2001, US, p)
- Mordaunt Roger Barnard (1828–1906, England, nf)
- Neal D. Barnard (born 1953, US, nf)
- Kitty Barne (1882–1961, England, d/ch)
- Ambrose Barnes (1627–1710, England, nf)
- Djuna Barnes (1892–1982, US, f/nf/p)
- Eric Barnes (born 1968, US, f)
- John Barnes (born 1957, US, f)
- Jonathan Barnes (born 1942, England, nf)
- Joshua Barnes (1654–1712, England, nf/f)
- Julian Barnes (born 1946, England, f)
- Steven Barnes (born 1952, US, f)
- Stuart Barnes (born 1977, Australia, p)
- Will C. Barnes (1858–1936, US, nf)
- William Barnes (1801–1886, p/nf)
- Annie Wall Barnett (1859–1942, US, p)
- Catherine Barnett (born 1960, US, p)
- Correlli Barnett (1927–2022, England, nf)
- Jill Barnett (living, US, f)
- Natalie Clifford Barney (1876–1972, US/France, d/p/f)
- Richard Barnfield (1574–1620, England, p)
- Wilton Barnhardt (born 1960, US, f)
- Kelly Barnhill (born 1973, US, ch)
- Vasil Barnovi (1856–1934, Russian E/USSR, f)
- Willis Barnstone (born 1927, US, p/nf)
- José Baroja (born 1983, Chile, nf)
- Alexander Baron (1917–1999, England, f/d)
- Evangeline Barongo (living, Uganda, ch)
- Linda Maria Baros (born 1981, Romania/France, p/nf)
- Amelia Edith Huddleston Barr (1831–1919, England, f)
- John Barr (1809–1889, Scotland/N Zealand, p)
- Miriam Barr (born 1982, N Zealand, p)
- Nevada Barr (born 1952, US, f)
- Pat Barr (1934–2018, England, f/nf)
- Mubarkah Bent al-Barra (born 1957, Mauritania, p)
- Geoffrey Barraclough (1908–1984, England, nf)
- Sarah Maria Barraud (1823–1895, N Zealand, nf)
- Tony Barrell (living, England, nf)
- Julio Pazos Barrera (born 1944, Ecuador, p)
- Maurice Barrès (1862–1923, France, f/nf)
- John Barret (1631–1713, England, nf)
- Joseph Barret (1665–1699, England, nf)
- Lima Barreto (1881–1922, Brazil, f/nf)
- A. Igoni Barrett (born 1979, Nigeria, f)
- Andrea Barrett (born 1954, US, f)
- Jo Barrett (living, US, f)
- Lindsay Barrett (born 1941, Jamaica/Nigeria, p/f/d)
- Lynne Barrett (living, US, f)
- Rachel Barrett (1874–1953, Wales/England, nf)
- Robert G. Barrett (1942–2012, Australia, f)
- William Barrett (1733–1789, England, nf)
- J. M. Barrie (1860–1937, Scotland/England, f/d/ch)
- Leslie Barringer (1895–1968, England, f)
- Eduardo Barrios (1884–1963, Chile, f/nf/p)
- Laird Barron (born 1970, US, f/p)
- T. A. Barron (born 1952, US, ch/nf)
- João de Barros (1496–1570, Portugal, nf)
- Isaac Barrow (1630–1677, England, nf)
- John Barrow (fl. 1735–1774, England, nf)
- Julia Barrow (born 1956, England, nf)
- William Barrow (1754–1836)
- Mark Barrowcliffe (born 1964, England, f)
- Rachel Barrowman (born 1963, N Zealand, nf)
- Angela Barry (born 1940s, Bermuda, f)
- Dave Barry (born 1947, US, nf/f)
- John Arthur Barry (1850–1911, England/Australia, f)
- Kevin Barry (born 1951, US, d)
- Kevin Barry (born 1969, Ireland, f)
- Kesso Barry (born 1948, Guinea/France, f)
- Margaret Stuart Barry (1927–2022, England, ch)
- Mariama Barry (living, Senegal, f)
- Max Barry (born 1973, Australia, f/nf)
- Rhoda Barry (1916–2011, South Africa, p)
- Stan Barstow (1928–2011, England, f)
- Sándor Barta (1897–1938, Hungary/USSR, p)
- Guillaume de Salluste Du Bartas (1544–1590, France, p)
- Adolf Bartels (1862–1945, Germany, nf/p)
- John Barth (1930–2024, US, f)
- Joachim Bartholomae (born 1956, Germany)
- Richard Bartholomew (1926–1985, Burma/India, nf/p)
- William Bartholomew (1793–1867, England, d)
- Mike Bartlett (born 1980, England, d)
- Vladimir Bartol (1903–1967, Yugoslavia/Slovenia, f/d)
- Bernard Barton (1784–1849, England, p)
- Charlotte Barton (1797–1867, Australia, ch)
- David Barton (born 1954, US, nf)
- Emily Mary Barton (1817–1909, Australia, p)
- Joan Barton (1908–1986, England, p)
- Gaston Bart-Williams (1938–1990, Sierra Leone/Germany, f/nf/p)
- Bipradash Barua (born 1940, India/Bangladesh, f)
- Bertha Hirsch Baruch (fl. early 20th c., Germany/US, nf)
- Violet Barungi (born 1943, Uganda, f/ch/d)
- Mildred Barya (born 1976, Uganda/US, f/nf/p)
- Empi Baryeh (living, Ghana, f)
- Jalal Barzanji (born 1953, Iraq, p/nf)
- Anabela Basalo (born 1972, Yugoslavia/Serbia, f)
- Svetislav Basara (born 1953, Yugoslavia/Serbia, nf)
- Neagoe Basarab (c. 1459–1521, Wallachia, nf)
- Graeme Base (born 1958, England/Australia, ch)
- Olumbe Bassir (1919–2001, Sierra Leone, nf)
- Angèle Bassolé-Ouédraogo (born 1967, Ivory Coast/Canada, p/nf)
- François Bassolet (1933–2001, Burkina Faso, nf)
- Jackee Budesta Batanda (living, Uganda, f/nf)
- Johann Bernhard Basedow (1724–1790, Germany, nf)
- Todd Bash (born 1965, US, d)
- Miryana Basheva (1947–2020, Bulgaria, p)
- Henry Howarth Bashford (1880–1961, England, f/nf)
- Al-Tijani Yusuf Bashir (1912–1937, Sudan, p)
- Matsuo Bashō (松尾芭蕉, 1644–1694, Japan, p)
- Michael Basinski (born 1950, US, p)
- Ellen Bass (born 1947, US, p)
- Nelson Estupiñán Bass (1912–2002, Ecuador, f/p/nf)
- T. J. Bass (1932–2011, US, f/nf), also known as Thomas J. Bassler
- Giorgio Bassani (1916–2000, Italy, f/p/nf)
- William Basse (c. 1583 – c. 1653, England, p)
- Marnie Bassett (1890–1980, Australia, nf)
- Hussein Bassir (living, Egypt, nf)
- Angèle Bassolé-Ouédraogo (born 1967, Ivory Coast/Canada, p/nf)
- Peter Bastian (1943–2017, Denmark, nf)
- Frédéric Bastiat (1801–1850, France, nf)
- Augusto Roa Bastos (1917–2005, Paraguay, f/d)
- Olav Rune Ekeland Bastrup (born 1956, Norway, nf)
- John Bastwick (1593–1654, England, nf)
- Georges Bataille (1897–1962, France, nf)
- Henry Bataille (1872–1922, France, d/p)
- Dušan T. Bataković (1957–2017, Yugoslavia/Serbia, nf)
- Jonathan Bate (born 1958, England, nf/f)
- Colin Bateman (born 1962, Ireland, f/ch)
- James Bateman (1811–1897, England, nf)
- Michael Bateman (1932–2006, England, nf)
- Arlo Bates (1850–1918, US, f/p/nf)
- Daisy Bates (1859–1951, Australia, nf)
- David Bates (1809–1970, US, p)
- H. E. Bates (1905–1974, England, f/nf/ch)
- Henry Walter Bates (1825–1892, England, nf)
- Katharine Lee Bates (1859–1929, US, p)
- Ralph Bates (1899–2000, England, f/nf)
- Catherine Bateson (born 1960, Australia, f/p)
- Elizabeth Bath (1776–1844, England, p)
- Joseph Bathanti (born 1953, US, p/f/nf)
- José Batlle y Ordóñez (1856–1929, Uruguay, nf)
- Larbi Batma (1948–1998, Morocco, p)
- Kofi Batsa (1931–1991, Gold Coast/Ghana, nf)
- János Batsányi (1763–1845, Hungary, p)
- Ibn Battuta (1304–1377, Morocco, nf)
- Enis Batur (born 1952, Turkey, p/nf/f)
- Wilhelm Bauberger (1809–1883, Germany, f)
- Henry Bauchau (1913–2012, Belgium/France, nf/p)
- Dawn-Michelle Baude (born 1959, US, p/nf)
- Charles Baudelaire (1821–1867, France, p/nf)
- Emma Pow Bauder (1848–1932, US, f)
- Wolfgang Bauer (1941–2005, Austria, d/f/p)
- Yehuda Bauer (1926–2024, Israel, nf)
- Edward Baugh (1936–2023, Jamaica, p/nf)
- Blanche Baughan (1870–1958, N Zealand, p/nf)
- L. Frank Baum (1856–1919, US, ch)
- Vicki Baum (1888–1960, Austria/US, f)
- Hans Baumann (1914–1988, Germany, p/ch)
- Ferdinand Christian Baur (1792–1860, Germany, nf)
- Cirilo Bautista (1941–2018, Philippines, p/nf)
- Lualhati Bautista (1945–2023, Philippines, f/nf)
- Gillian Baverstock (1931–2007, England, nf/f)
- Nina Bawden (1925–2012, England, ch)
- Alan Baxter (born 1970, England/Australia, f)
- Andrew Baxter (metaphysician) (1686/1687–1750, Scotland, nf)
- Charles Baxter (born 1947, US, f/nf/p)
- James K. Baxter (1926–1972, N Zealand, p/d)
- John Baxter (born 1939, Australia/France, f/nf)
- Marion Babcock Baxter (1850–1910, US, nf/p)
- Richard Baxter (1615–1691, England, nf/p)
- Stephen Baxter (born 1957, England, f)
- Mary Temple Bayard (1853–1916, US, f/nf)
- Basil Al Bayati (born 1946, Iraq/England, nf)
- Sevtap Baycılı (born 1968, Netherlands, f)
- Mohammed al-Baydhaq (died post-1164, Morocco, nf)
- Konrad Bayer (1932–1964, Austria, p/f)
- William Bayer (born 1939, US, f)
- Arthur Bayldon (1865–1958, England/Australia, p/f)
- Pierre Bayle (1647–1706, France/Netherlands, nf)
- William Baylebridge (1883–1942, Australia, p/f)
- John Bayley (writer) (1925–2015, England, f/nf)
- Peter Bayley (1778–1823, England, p/d)
- Ada Ellen Bayly (1857–1903, England, f), pseudonym of Edna Lyall
- Jaime Bayly (born 1965, Peru, f/p/nf)
- Thomas Haynes Bayly (1797–1839, England, p/d/nf)
- Barbara Baynton (1857–1929, Australia, f)
- Martin Baynton (born 1953, England/N Zealand, f/ch)
- Siham Bayyumi (born 1949, Egypt, f/nf)
- Ernest Bazanye (living, Uganda, f/nf)
- Nura Bazdulj-Hubijar (born 1951, Yugoslavia/Bosnia, f/ch/p)
- René Bazin (1853–1932, France, f)
- "BB" (1905–1990, England, ch/nf), pseudonym of Denys Watkins-Pitchford

== Be ==
- Eric Beach (1947–2024, N Zealand/Australia, p/d/f)
- Jeremy John Beadle (1956–1995, England, nf)
- John Beadle (died 1667, England, nf)
- John Beaglehole (1901–1971, N Zealand, nf)
- Ishmael Beah (born 1980, Sierra Leone, nf/f)
- Lesley Beake (born 1949, Scotland/S Africa, ch)
- Anne Beale (1816–1900, England/Wales, f/p)
- Fleur Beale (born 1945, N Zealand, f/ch)
- Marcel Béalu (1908–1993, France, f/p/d)
- S.G. Hulme Beaman (1887–1932, England, ch)
- Margaret Beames (1935–2016, N Zealand, ch)
- Richard Bean (born 1956, England, d)
- Elizabeth Bear (born 1971, US, f)
- Aubrey Beardsley (1872–1898, England, nf)
- Greg Bear (born 1951, US, f)
- Delilah L. Beasley (1871–1934, US, nf)
- Richard Beasley (born 1964, Australia, f/nf)
- Doug Beason (born 1953, US, f)
- Clara Bancroft Beatley (1858–1923, US, nf)
- Beatrice of Nazareth (c. 1200–1268, Flanders, nf)
- James Beattie (1735–1803, Scotland, nf)
- Jan Beatty (born 1952, US, p)
- Jerome Beatty Jr. (1916–2002, US, ch)
- John and Patricia Beatty (1922–1975, 1922–1991, US, f/nf)
- Laura Beatty (born 1963, England, f/nf)
- Sally Beauman (1944–2016, England, f/nf)
- Pierre Beaumarchais (1732–1799, France, d/nf)
- Beaumont and Fletcher (early 17th c., England, d)
- Charles Beaumont (1929–1967, US, f)
- Francis Beaumont (1584–1616, England, d)
- Jeanne-Marie Leprince de Beaumont (1711–1780, France, ch)
- John Beaumont (1552/1553–1627, England, p)
- Joseph Beaumont (1616–1699, England, p)
- Airini Beautrais (born 1982, N Zealand, p)
- Simone de Beauvoir (1908–1986, France, nf)
- Bruce Beaver (1928–2004, Australia, p/f)
- Samuel Beazley (1786–1851, England, f/d/nf)
- Ambrose Bebb (1894–1955, Wales, nf)
- Francis Bebey (1929–2001, Cameroon/France, f/nf)
- Cesare Beccaria (1738–1794, Italy, nf)
- Margaret Bechard (born 1953, US, ch)
- Johannes R. Becher (1891–1958, Germany, f/p)
- Béatrix Beck (1914–2008, Switzerland, f/p)
- Philippe Beck (born 1963, France, p/nf)
- George Lewis Becke (1855–1913, Australia, f)
- Aaron Becker (born 1974, US, ch)
- Herbert L. Becker (born 1956, US)
- Jillian Becker (born 1932, S Africa, f/nf)
- Jurek Becker (1937–1997, Germany, f/nf)
- Jürgen Becker (1932–2024, Germany, p/f)
- Bernard Beckett (born 1967, N Zealand, f/ch)
- Chris Beckett (born 1955, England, f/nf)
- Gilbert Abbott à Beckett (1811–1856, England, f/nf/d)
- Samuel Beckett (1906–1989, Ireland/France, f/d/p)
- Peter Beckford (1740–1811, England, nf)
- William Beckford (1760–1844, England, f/nf)
- Joshua Beckman (living, US, p)
- Thea Beckman (1923–2004, Netherlands, ch)
- Matija Bećković (born 1939, Yugoslavia/Serbia, p/nf)
- Lillian Beckwith (1916–2004), England/Scotland, nf)
- Gustavo Adolfo Bécquer (1836–1870, Spain, p/f/d)
- Thomas Lovell Beddoes (1803–1849, England, p/d)
- Frank Beddor (born 1958, US, f/ch)
- Bede (672/673–735, England, nf)
- Jean Bedford (1946–2025, Australia, f)
- Jimmy B. Bedford (1927–1990, US, nf)
- K. A. Bedford (born 1963, Australia, f)
- Randolph Bedford (1868–1941, Australia, p/f)
- Ruth Bedford (1882–1963, Australia, p/d/ch)
- Simi Bedford (living, Nigeria/England, f)
- Sybille Bedford (1911–2006, Germany/England, nf/f)
- Guy de la Bédoyère (born 1957, England, nf)
- Jack Bedson (born 1950, Australia, p/ch)
- William Bedwell (1561–1632, England, nf)
- George Beeby (1869–1942, Australia, nf/d/f)
- Henry Beeching (1859–1919, England, p/nf)
- Patricia Beer (1919–1999, England, p/nf)
- Rachel Beer (1858–1927, India/England, nf)
- Constance Beerbohm (1856–1939, England, d/nf)
- Julius Beerbohm (1854–1906, England, nf)
- Max Beerbohm (1872–1956, England, nf)
- Alfred Beesley (1800–1847, England, nf/p)
- Isabella Beeton (1836-1865, England, nf), known as Mrs. Beeton
- Nicolaas Beets (1814–1903, Netherlands, nf/p)
- Antony Beevor (born 1946, England, nf)
- Azouz Begag (born 1957, France, f/nf/ch)
- Philip Begho (born 1956, Nigeria, d/ch/f)
- Régis Bégué (born 1970, France, f)
- Michael Beheim (1416 – c. 1472, Germany, p)
- Albrecht Behmel (born 1971, Germany, f/nf/d)
- Aphra Behn (1640–1689, England, d/p/f)
- Ari Behn (1972–2019, Norway, f/d/nf)
- Mark Behr (1963–2015, Tanganyika/S Africa, f/nf)
- Larissa Behrendt (born 1969, Australia, nf/f)
- Bei Dao (北島, born 1949, China, p/f/nf), pseudonym of Zhao Zhenkai
- Maria Beig (1920–2018, Germany, f)
- Sara Beirão (1880–1974, Portugal, f/ch)
- Luke Francis Beirne ( – , Irish-Canadian, f)
- Olinda Beja (born 1946, São Tomé and Príncipe, p/f/ch)
- Hélé Béji (born 1948, Tunisia, f/nf)
- Alexander Bek (1903–1972, Russia/USSR, f/nf
- Ferenc Békássy (1893–1915, Hungary, p)
- Hafsa Bekri (born 1948, Morocco, p/f)
- Tahar Bekri (born 1951, Tunisia/France, p/nf)
- Matthias Bel (1684–1749, Austria-Hungary, nf)
- Radomir Belaćević (1929–2005, Yugoslavia/Serbia, f)
- Abderrazak Belagrouz (born 1981, Algeria, nf)
- Rabah Belamri (1946–1995, Algeria, p/f/nf)
- David Belbin (born 1958, England, f)
- Daubridgecourt Belchier (1580–1621, England, d)
- Cedric Belfrage (1904–1990, England/Mexico, nf)
- Sally Belfrage (1936–1994, US/England, nf)
- Abdelmalek Belghiti (1906–2010, Morocco, p)
- Farida Belghoul (born 1958, Algeria/France, f/d)
- Omar Belhouchet (born 1954, Algeria, nf)
- Aleksandar Belić (1876–1960, Serbia/Yugoslavia, nf)
- James Belich (born 1956, N Zealand, nf)
- Erin Belieu (born 1965, US, p)
- Adrian Bell (1901–1980, England, nf)
- Clive Bell (1881–1964, England, nf)
- Diane Bell (born 1943, Australia, nf)
- Florence Bell (1851–1930, England, nf/d/ch)
- Gertrude Bell (1868–1926, England, nf)
- Hilary Bell (born 1966, Australia, d)
- Horace Bell (1830–1918, US, nf)
- Josephine Bell (1897–1987, England, f/d)
- Julia Bell (1879–1979, England, nf)
- Julian Bell (1908–1937, England, p)
- Marvin Bell (1937–2020, US, p)
- Mary Hayley Bell (1911–2005, England, f)
- Quentin Bell (1910–1996, England, nf)
- Thomas Bell (1792–1880, England, nf)
- John Bellairs (1938–1991, US, f)
- Mario Bellatin (born 1960, Mexico, f)
- Joachim du Bellay (c. 1522–1560, France, p/nf)
- Rémy Belleau (1528–1577, France, p)
- Lisa Bellear (1961–2006, Australia, p/d/nf)
- John Bellers (1654–1725, England, nf)
- Gioconda Belli (born 1948, Nicaragua, nf/f/p)
- Giuseppe Gioachino Belli (1791–1863, Italy, p)
- Carl Michael Bellman (1740–1795, Sweden, p)
- Andrés Bello (1781–1865, Venezuela/Chile, nf/p)
- Muhammed Bello (1781–1837, Sokoto Caliphate, nf)
- Joaquín Edwards Bello (1887–1968, Chile, f)
- Xuan Bello (1965–2025, Spain, p/f/nf)
- Hilaire Belloc (1870–1953, France/England, p/nf)
- Saul Bellow (1915–2005, US, f/d/nf)
- Ruy Belo (1933–1978, Portugal, p/nf)
- Jelica Belović-Bernadzikowska (1870–1946, Austria-Hungary/Yugoslavia, ch)
- Rune Belsvik (born 1956, Norway, f/c/ch)
- Thomas Belt (1832–1878, England, nf)
- Andrei Bely (1880–1934, Russian E/USSR, f/p/nf)
- Ludwig Bemelmans (1898–1962, Austria-Hungary/US, ch/f)
- Myriam Ben (1928–2001, Algeria, f/p)
- Abdelkader Benali (born 1975, Morocco/Netherlands, f/d/nf)
- Siham Benchekroun (living, Morocco, f/p)
- Ahmed Benchemsi (born 1974, Morocco, nf)
- Rajae Benchemsi (born 1957, Morocco, p/nf)
- Mohammed Benchicou (born 1952, Algeria, nf)
- Peter Benchley (1940–2006, US, f/nf)
- Emil Benčík (born 1933, Czechoslovakia/Slovakia, nf)
- Esther Bendahan (born 1964, Morocco/Spain, f)
- Don Bendell (born 1947, US, f/nf)
- Hans Bender (1907–1991, Germany, nf)
- D. R. Bendre (1896–1981, India, p)
- Elek Benedek (1859–1929, Hungary, nf)
- Mario Benedetti (1920–2009, Uruguay, f/nf/p)
- Antonio di Benedetto (1922–1986, Argentina, f/nf)
- Hester A. Benedict (1838–1921, US, p)
- Victoria Benedictsson (1850–1888, Sweden, f), pseudonym Ernst Ahlgren
- Einar Benediktsson (1864–1940, Iceland, p)
- Juan Benet (1927–1993, Spain, f/d/nf)
- Stephen Vincent Benét (1898–1943, US, p/f)
- William Rose Benét (1886–1950, US, p)
- Anthony Benezet (1713–1784, France/US, nf), born Antoine Bénézet
- Gregory Benford (born 1941, US, f)
- Sokhna Benga (born 1967, Senegal, f/p)
- Johann Albrecht Bengel (1687–1752, Germany, nf)
- Elizabeth Benger (1775–1827, England, nf/f/p)
- Frans G. Bengtsson (1894–1954, Sweden, f/nf/p)
- Berthe Bénichou-Aboulker (1888–1942, Algeria, p/d)
- Rambriksh Benipuri (1899–1968, India, d/nf)
- José Gautier Benítez (1848–1880, Puerto Rico, p)
- Mihai Beniuc (1907–1988, Austria-Hungary/Romania, p/d/f)
- Walter Benjamin (1892–1940, Germany/France, nf)
- Abdelmajid Benjelloun (1919–1981, Morocco, f/p/nf)
- Abdelmajid Benjelloun (born 1944, Morocco, nf)
- Salah Benlabed (born 1950, Algeria, f/p)
- Edward Benlowes (1603–1676, England, p)
- Abdelwahab Benmansour (1920–2008, Morocco, nf)
- Gottfried Benn (1886–1956, Germany, p/nf)
- Malek Bennabi (1905–1973, Algeria, nf)
- Olaf Benneche (1883–1931, Norway, f/ch/d)
- Thomas Bennet (1673–1728, England, nf)
- Alan Bennett (born 1934, England, d)
- Anna Maria Bennett (c. 1750–1808, Wales/England, f)
- Arnold Bennett (1867–1931, England, f/d)
- Edwin Keppel Bennett (1887–1958, England, nf/p), pseudonyms Francis Bennett and Francis Keppel
- Gwendolyn B. Bennett (1902–1981, US, p/nf)
- Jim Bennett (born 1951, England, p)
- Mary Montgomerie Bennett (1881–1961, Australia, nf)
- Sophia Bennett (born 1966, f/ch)
- Louise Bennett-Coverley (1919–2006, Jamaica, p/nf)
- Stefano Benni (1947–2025, Italy, d/p/f)
- Mohammed Bennis (born 1948, Morocco, p)
- Khnata Bennouna (born 1940, Morocco, f)
- Noura Bensaad (living, Tunisia, f)
- Isaac de Benserade (1613–1691, France, p)
- A. C. Benson (1862–1925, England, nf/p)
- E. F. Benson (1867–1940, England, f/nf)
- Fiona Benson (born 1978, England, p)
- Peter Benson (born 1956, England, f/d/p)
- Robert Hugh Benson (1871–1914, England, f/ch/nf)
- Stella Benson (1892–1933, England, f/p/nf)
- T. J. Benson (living, Nigeria, f)
- James Theodore Bent (1852–1897, England, nf)
- George Bentham (1800–1884, England, nf)
- Jeremy Bentham (1748–1832, England, nf)
- Edmund Clerihew Bentley (1875–1956, England, p)
- Elizabeth Bentley (1767–1839, England, p)
- Nicolas Bentley (1907–1978, England, p)
- Phyllis Bentley (1894–1977, England, f)
- Richard Bentley (1662–1742, England, nf)
- Annie Bentoiu (1927–2015, Romania, f/p/nf)
- Derek Benz (born 1971, US, ch)
- Mohammed Benzakour (born 1972, Morocco/Netherlands, nf/p)
- Erik Benzelius the younger (1675–1743, Sweden, nf)
- Pierre-Jean de Béranger (1780–1857, France, p)
- Edward Berdoe (1836–1916, England, nf)
- Berechiah ha-Nakdan (13th c., England or France, nf/p)
- Richard Berengarten (born 1943, England, p)
- Bernard Berenson (1865–1959, US/Italy, nf)
- Stan and Jan Berenstain (1923–2005 and 1923–2012, US, ch/nf)
- Elisabeth Beresford (1926–2010, France/England, ch)
- J. D. Beresford (1873–1947, England, f)
- James Beresford (1764–1840, England, nf)
- Lars Berg (1901–1969, Norway, f/d)
- Leila Berg (1917–2012, England, ch/nf)
- David Bergelson (1884–1952, Russian E/USSR, f/nf)
- Werner Bergengruen (1892–1964, Russian E/Germany, f/p)
- Aleš Berger (born 1946, Yugoslavia/Slovenia, nf/d)
- John Berger (1926–2017, England, nf/f/p)
- Hjalmar Bergman (1883–1931, Sweden/Germany, f/d)
- Bo Bergman (1869–1967, Sweden, f/nf)
- Árni Bergmann (born 1935, Iceland, f/nf)
- Eirikur Bergmann (born 1969, Iceland, nf/f)
- Herz Bergner (1907–1970, Austria-Hungary/Australia, f)
- Guðbergur Bergsson (1932–2023, Iceland, nf/ch/p)
- Elisabeth Bergstrand-Poulsen (1887–1955, Sweden/Denmark, nf)
- İlhan Berk (1918–2008, Ottoman Empire/Turkey, p)
- Reginald Berkeley (1890–1935, England, d)
- John Berkenhout (1726–1791, England, nf)
- Ulla Berkéwicz (born 1948, Germany, f/nf/d)
- Steven Berkoff (born 1937, England, d/nf)
- Chip Berlet (1949–2026, US, nf)
- Paul Berna (1908–1994, France, f/ch), pseudonym of Jean-Marie-Edmond Sabran
- Jean Bernabé (1942–2017, Martinique, f/nf)
- Georges Bernanos (1888–1948, France, f/nf)
- Christian Bernard (born 1951, France, nf)
- Patricia Bernard (born 1942, Australia, f)
- William Bayle Bernard (1807–1875, US/England, d/nf)
- Juliana Berners (born 1388, England, nf)
- Thomas Bernhard (1931–1989, Netherlands/Austria, f/d/p)
- August Ferdinand Bernhardi (1769–1820, Germany, nf)
- Louis de Bernières (born 1954, England, f)
- J. Bernlef (1937–2012, Netherlands, f/nf/p), pseudonym of Hendrik Jan Marsman
- Charles Bernstein (born 1950, US, p/nf)
- Elsa Bernstein (1866–1949, Austria/Germany, d), pseudonym Ernst Rosmer
- Béroul (12th c., France, p)
- Mohammed Berrada (born 1938, Morocco, f/nf)
- Elizabeth Berridge (1919–2009, England, f/nf)
- Daniel Berrigan (1921–2016, US, p/d/nf)
- Ted Berrigan (1934–1983, US, p)
- Francis Berry (1915–2006, England, p/nf)
- James Berry (1924–2017, Jamaica/England, p)
- Mary Berry (born 1935, England, nf)
- Mary Berry (1763–1852, England, nf)
- Mary Frances Berry (born 1938, US, nf)
- Steve Berry (born 1955, US, f)
- Wendell Berry (born 1934, US, f/nf/p)
- Tess Berry-Hart (born 1978, England, d/f/ch)
- John Berryman (1914–1972, US, p/nf)
- Mei-mei Berssenbrugge (白萱华, born 1947, China/US, p/d/nf)
- Louky Bersianik (1930–2011, Canada, f), pseudonym of Lucille Durand
- Þráinn Bertelsson (born 1944, Iceland, nf/f/ch)
- Eduardo Berti (born 1964, Argentina/France, f/nf)
- Al Berto (1948–1997, Portugal, p/nf), pseudonym of Alberto Raposo Pidwell Tavares
- Pierre Berton (1920–2004, Canada, nf)
- Charles Bertram (1723–1765, England/Denmark, nf)
- Aloysius Bertrand (1807–1841, France, p/d/nf)
- Betty Berzon (1928–2006, US, nf)
- Dániel Berzsenyi (1776–1836, Hungary, p)
- Annie Besant (1847–1933, England, nf)
- Walter Besant (1836–1901, England, f/nf)
- Alen Bešić (born 1975, Yugoslavia/Serbia, nf/p)
- Bertrand Besigye (born 1972, Uganda/Norway, p/f)
- Besiki (1750–1791, Kingdom of Kartli, p)
- Khadija Besikri (born 1962, Libya, p/nf)
- Elsa Beskow (1874–1953, Sweden, ch)
- Bate Besong (1954–2007, Cameroon, d/p/nf)
- Agustina Bessa-Luís (1922–2019, Portugal, f/nf)
- György Bessenyei (1747–1811, Hungary, d/p)
- Gérard Bessière (1928–2024, France, nf/p)
- Luc Besson (born 1959, France, d)
- Bessora (born 1968, Belgium/France, f)
- Charles Best (1570–1627, England, p)
- Alfred Bestall (1892–1986, England, ch)
- Henry Digby Beste (1768–1836, England, nf)
- Alfred Bester (1913–1987, US, f)
- Mary Matilda Betham (1776–1852, England, nf/p)
- Matilda Betham-Edwards (1836–1919, England, f/nf/p)
- Marion Bethel (born 1953, Bahamas, p/nf)
- Christopher Bethell (1773–1859, England/Wales, nf)
- Nicholas Bethell (1938–2007, England, nf)
- Ursula Bethell (1874–1945, N Zealand, p)
- Kata Bethlen (1700–1759, Hungary, nf)
- Adrien Bertrand (1888–1917, France, f)
- Mongo Beti (1932–2001, Cameroon, f/nf), pseudonym of Alexandre Biyidi Awala
- John Betjeman (1906–1984, England, p/nf)
- Minoru Betsuyaku (別役実, 1937–2020, Manchuria/Japan, d/f/nf)
- Hugo Bettauer (1872–1925, Austria, f/d/nf)
- Jean Betts (living, N Zealand, d)
- Torben Betts (born 1968, England, d)
- Dricky Beukes (1918–1999, S Africa, f/d)
- Lauren Beukes (born 1976, S Africa, f/nf/d)
- Maja Beutler (1936–2021, Switzerland, f/d)
- Edwyn Bevan (1870–1943, England, nf)
- Evan Bevan (1803–1866, Wales, p), pseudonym Ianto'r Castel
- Elizabeth Bevarly (born 1961, US, f)
- Cvetka Bevc (born 1960, Yugoslavia/Slovenia, nf/p/ch)
- Judith Beveridge (born 1956, England/Australia, p/nf)
- Elizabeth Beverley (1792–1832, England, nf)
- Jo Beverley (1947–2016, England/Canada, f)
- Alberto Bevilacqua (1934–2013, Italy, d/f/p)
- Helen Bevington (1906–2001, US, p/nf)
- L. S. Bevington (1845–1895, England, nf/p)
- France Bevk (1890–1970, Austrian E/Yugoslavia, f/nf/p)
- Thomas Bewick (1753–1828, England, nf)
- Calixthe Beyala (born 1961, Cameroon/France, f/nf)
- Yahya Kemal Beyatlı (1884–1958, Ottoman E/Turkey, p/nf)
- Drusilla Beyfus (1927–2026, England, nf)
- Tom Beynon (1886–1961, Wales, nf)

== Bh–Bl ==
- Bhabananda Deka (1929–2006, India, nf)
- Saru Bhakta (born 1955, Nepal, d/f/p)
- Subramania Bharati (1882–1921, India, p/nf)
- Sujata Bhatt (born 1956, India, p)
- Motiram Bhatta (1923–1953, Nepal, p/f/nf)
- Subin Bhattarai (born 1982, Nepal, f)
- Bhavakadevi (c. 12th c. CE, India, p)
- Olympe Bhêly-Quenum (born 1928, Benin/France, f)
- Bi Feiyu (毕飞宇, born 1964, China, f)
- Źmitrok Biadula (1886–1941, Russian E/USSR, p/nf)
- Miron Białoszewski (1922–1983, Poland, p/f/d)
- Matilde Bianchi (1927–1991, Uruguay, p/nf)
- Helen Bianchin (born 1939, N Zealand/Australia, f)
- Héctor Bianciotti (1930–2012, Argentina/France, f)
- Bianji (辯機, fl. 7th c., China, nf)
- Vitaly Bianki (1894–1959, Russian E/USSR, ch/nf)
- Elizabeth Bibesco (1897–1945, England/France, f/p/nf)
- Marthe Bibesco (1886–1973, Romania/France, f/nf)
- Peter Bichsel (1935–2025, Switzerland, f/ch)
- Anna McClean Bidder (1903–2001, England, nf)
- Joyce Bidder (1906–1999, England)
- Marion Bidder (1862–1932, England, nf)
- Tessa Biddington (born 1954, England, p)
- Hester Biddle (c. 1629–1697, England, nf)
- Jacob Bidermann (1578–1639, Austrian E/Italy, d/f/nf)
- Ruth Bidgood (1922–2022, Wales, p/nf)
- Bidisha (born 1978, England, nf), born Bidisha Bandyopadhyay
- Cornelis de Bie (1627 – c. 1712–1715, Netherlands, nf/d)
- David Biedrzycki (born 1955, US, ch)
- Paul Biegel (1925–2006, Netherlands, ch)
- Christabel Bielenberg (1909–2003, Germany/Ireland, nf)
- Aristide von Bienefeldt (1959–2016, Netherlands, f), pseudonym of Rijk de Jong
- Ambrose Bierce (1842–1914, US, f/nf/p)
- Linda Bierds (born 1945, US, p)
- Peter Bieri (1944–2023, Switzerland, f/nf), pseudonym Pascal Mercier
- Wolf Biermann (born 1936, Germany, nf)
- Biernat of Lublin (c. 1465 – post-1529, Poland, p)
- Maarten Biesheuvel (1939–2020, Netherlands, f)
- Carli Biessels (1936–2016, Netherlands, ch)
- Ella A. Bigelow (1849–1917, US, nf)
- Lettie S. Bigelow (1849–1906, US, f/p)
- John Stanyan Bigg (1828–1965, England, p)
- Earl Derr Biggers (1884–1933, US, f/d)
- Barbara Biggs (born 1956, Australia, nf)
- John B. Biggs (born 1934, Australia, f/nf)
- Margaret Biggs (born 1929, England, ch)
- John Bigland (1750–1832, England, nf)
- Steve Biko (1946–1977, S Africa, nf)
- Olavo Bilac (1865–1918, Brazil, p/nf)
- Irene Ibsen Bille (1901–1985, Norway, f/d)
- S. Corinna Bille (1912–1979, Switzerland, p/f/ch)
- Graham Billing (1936–2001, N Zealand, f/nf/p)
- Mark Billingham (born 1961, England, f/d)
- Franny Billingsley (born 1954, US, ch)
- William Billington (1825–1884, England, p)
- Eva Billow (1902–1993, Sweden, ch/p)
- Thomas Bilson (1547–1616, England, nf)
- Maeve Binchy (1940–2012, Ireland, f/d/nf)
- Eando Binder (1911–1974 and 1904–1966, US, f), synonym of Otto and Earl Binder
- Ida Bindschedler (1854–1919, Switzerland, ch)
- Mahi Binebine (born 1959, Morocco, f)
- Andrew Bing (1574–1652, England, nf)
- Jon Bing (1944–2014, Norway, f)
- Bing Xin (冰心, 1900–1999, China, f/ch), pseudonym of Xie Wanying (謝婉瑩)
- Charlotte Bingham (1942–2025, England, f)
- Jennie M. Bingham (1859–1933, US, f/nf/p)
- Margaret Bingham (1740–1814, England, p), Countess of Lucan
- Judith Binney (1940–2011, N Zealand, nf)
- Laurence Binyon (1869–1943, England, p/d/nf)
- T. J. Binyon (1836–1904, England, f)
- Ayse Bircan (born 1954, Turkey/England, nf)
- Carol Birch (born 1951, England, f/nf)
- Thomas Birch (1705–1766, England, nf)
- Carmel Bird (born 1940, Australia, f)
- Caroline Bird (born 1986, England, p/d/f)
- Hera Lindsay Bird (born 1987, N Zealand, p)
- Isabella Bird (1831–1904, England, nf)
- Jessica Bird (born 1969, US, f)
- Poldy Bird (1941–2018, Argentina, p/nf/ch)
- Arnthor Birgisson (born 1976, Iceland/Sweden, p)
- Dea Birkett (born 1958, England, nf)
- Winifred Birkett (1887–1975, Australia, f/p)
- Anno Birkin (1980–2001, England, p)
- Marcelo Birmajer (born 1966, Argentina, f/nf/ch)
- John Birmingham (born 1964, England/Australia, nf/f)
- Stephen Birnbaum (c. 1937–1991, US, nf)
- Earle Birney (1904–1995, Canada, p/f)
- Marcus Birro (born 1972, Sweden, p/f/nf)
- Peter Birro (born 1966, Sweden, p/d)
- Nevin Birsa (1947–2003, Yugoslavia/Slovenia, p)
- Balázs Birtalan (1969–2016, Hungary, p/nf)
- Dora Birtles (1903–1992, Australia, f/p/nf)
- John Birtwhistle (born 1946, England, p)
- Sonja Biserko (born 1948, Yugoslavia/Serbia, nf)
- Claire Huchet Bishop (1898–1993, Switzerland/France, ch/nf)
- Elizabeth Bishop (1911–1979, US, p/f)
- Gavin Bishop (born 1946, N Zealand, ch)
- Jacqueline Bishop (living, Jamaica/US, nf)
- K. J. Bishop (living, Australia, f)
- Samuel Bishop (1731–1795, England, p/nf)
- Ram Prasad Bismil (1897–1927, p)
- Bill Bissett (born 1939, Canada, p)
- Terry Bisson (1942–2024, US, f)
- Farhad Bitani (born 1986, Afghanistan/Italy, nf/f)
- László Z. Bitó (1934–2021, Hungary, f/nf)
- Andrei Bitov (1937–2018, USSR/Russia, f/p)
- Sherwin Bitsui (born 1974, US, p)
- Emily Bitto (living, Australia, f)
- Jerome Bixby (1923–1998, US, f/d)
- Piers Bizony (born 1959, England, nf)
- Bjarni Bjarnason (born 1965, Iceland, p/d/f)
- Sava Bjelanović (1850–1897, Austria-Hungary, nf)
- Isidora Bjelica (1966–2020, Yugoslavia/Serbia, f/nf/d)
- Marie Bjelke-Petersen (1874–1969, Australia, f)
- Mirjana Bjelogrlić-Nikolov (born 1961, Yugoslavia/Serbia, f/nf)
- André Bjerke (1918–1985, Norway, p/f/ch)
- Henrik Anker Bjerregaard (1792–1842, Norway, p/d)
- Jens Bjerre (1921–2020, Denmark, nf)
- Bryndís Björgvinsdóttir (born 1982, Iceland, ch)
- Björk (born 1965, Iceland/US, nf), full name Björk Guðmundsdóttir
- Christina Björk (born 1938, Sweden, nf/ch)
- Jens Bjørneboe (1920–1976, Norway, f/d/p)
- Anna Svanhildur Björnsdóttir (born 1948, Iceland, p)
- Sigrún Edda Björnsdóttir (born 1958, Iceland, ch)
- Bjørnstjerne Bjørnson (1832–1910, Norway, p/f/d)
- Björn Th. Björnsson (1922–2007, Iceland, f)
- Eysteinn Björnsson (born 1942, Iceland, ch/p/f)
- Ketil Bjørnstad (born 1952, Norway, f/p/nf)
- Clementina Black (1853–1922, England, nf)
- Holly Black (born 1971, US, ch)
- Jenna Black (born 1993, US, f/ch)
- Robert Black (1829–2015, England, f/nf)
- Star Black (living, US, p)
- William Black (1841–1898, Scotland/England, f)
- Sarah Blackborow (fl. 1650s – 1660s, England, nf)
- Estelle Blackburn (born 1950, Australia, nf)
- John Blackburn (1923–1993, England, f)
- Paul Blackburn (1926–1971, US, p)
- Thomas Blackburn (1916–1977, England, p/nf)
- Venita Blackburn (born 1983, US, f)
- Basil Blackett (1882–1935, India/Germany, nf)
- Troy Blacklaws (born 1965, S Africa, f)
- Malorie Blackman (born 1962, England, ch)
- Leigh Blackmore (born 1959, Australia, f/nf)
- R. D. Blackmore (1825–1900, England, f)
- Richard Blackmore (1654–1729, England, p)
- R. P. Blackmur (1904–1965, US, nf/p)
- William Blackstone (1723–1780, England, nf)
- Ellen Wright Blackwell (1864–1952, N Zealand, nf)
- John Blackwell (1797–1840, Wales, p/nf)
- Algernon Blackwood (1869–1951, England, f/d)
- Caroline Blackwood (1931–1996, England, f/nf)
- Helen Blackwood (1807–1867, England, f/d)
- Peter Bladen (1922–2001, Australia, p)
- Sara Blædel (born 1964, Denmark, f)
- Lucian Blaga (1895–1961, Austria-Hungary/Romania, p/d/f)
- Isa Blagden (1816 or 1817–1873, India/Italy, f/p)
- Max Blagg (born 1948, England/US, p/nf)
- Marina Blagojević (1958–2020, Yugoslavia/Serbia, nf)
- Georgia Blain (1964–2016, Australia, f/nf)
- Suessa Baldridge Blaine (1860–1932, US, f)
- Emma Helen Blair (1851–1911, US, nf)
- Hugh Blair (1718–1800, Scotland, nf)
- Robert Blair (1593–1666, Scotland, nf)
- Robert Blair (1699–1746, Scotland, p)
- Marie-Claire Blais (1939–2021, Canada, f/p/d)
- Isidoro Blaisten (1933–2004, Argentina, f/nf/p)
- Ally Blake (living, Australia, f)
- Jennifer Blake (born 1942, US, f)
- Quentin Blake (born 1932, England, ch)
- William Blake (1757–1827, England, p)
- William J. Blake (1894–1968, US, f/nf)
- Helen Blakeman (born 1971, England, d)
- Stella Blakemore (1906–1996, S Africa/N Ireland, f/ch)
- Edward Henry Blakeney (1869–1955, England, nf/p)
- Susanna Blamire (1747–1794, England, p)
- Edward Litt Laman Blanchard (1820–1889, England, d)
- Samuel Laman Blanchard (1804–1845, England, p/nf)
- August Blanche (1811–1868, Sweden, f/d)
- Paddy Blanchfield (1911–1980, N Zealand, p/nf
- Maurice Blanchot (1907–2003, France, f/nf)
- Andrés Eloy Blanco (1896–1955, Venezuela, p)
- Eduardo Blanco (1838–1912, Venezuela, f/nf)
- Don Blanding (1894–1957, US, p)
- Arapera Blank (1932–2002, N Zealand, p)
- Clair Blank (1915–1965, US, f/ch)
- Hanne Blank (born 1969, US, f/nf)
- Philippe Blasband (born 1964, ?, f)
- Laslo Blašković (born 1966, Yugoslavia/Serbia, p/nf)
- Robert Blatchford (1851–1943, England, nf)
- Silvio Blatter (born 1946, Switzerland, f)
- William Peter Blatty (1928–2017, US, f/d/nf)
- Yaakov Blau (1929–2013, Palestine/Israel, nf)
- Barbara Blaugdone (c. 1609–1704, England, nf)
- Peter Blauner (born 1959, US, f)
- John Benibengor Blay (1915–1970s, Gold Coast/Ghana, f/p/nf)
- James P. Blaylock (born 1950, US, f)
- Diana Blayne (born 1946, US, f/nf), pseudonym of Susan Spaeth Kyle
- Emily Rose Bleby (1849–1917, Jamaica/UK, nf)
- Max Blecher (1909–1938, Romania, f/nf)
- Ann Eliza Bleecker (1752–1783, US, p/f/nf)
- Anne Blencowe (1656–1718, England, nf)
- Adrian Blevins (born 1964, US, p)
- John Blight (1913–1995, Australia, p)
- Nicholas Blincoe (born 1965, England, f)
- Mathilde Blind (1841–1896, Germany/England, p/f/nf)
- James Blish (1921–1975, US, f/nf)
- Edward Blishen (1920–1996, England, ch/f)
- Eliot Bliss (1903–1990, Jamaica/England, f/p/nf)
- Walter Blith (1605–1654, England, nf)
- Karen Blixen (1885–1962, Denmark/Kenya, f/nf), pseudonym Isak Dinesen
- Nikolay Bliznakov (born 1950, Bulgaria, f/nf)
- Curt Bloch (1908–1975, Germany, p, nf)
- Pedro Bloch (1914–2004, Ukraine/Brazil, d/ch)
- Robert Bloch (1917–1994, US, f)
- Adélaïde-Louise d'Eckmühl de Blocqueville (1815–1892, France, f/nf/p)
- J. C. Bloem (1887–1966, Netherlands, p/nf)
- Marion Bloem (born 1952, Netherlands, f/nf)
- François Bloemhof (born 1962, S Africa, f/ch)
- Alexander Blok (1880–1921, Russia, p/d/nf)
- Francis Blomefield (1705–1752, England, nf)
- Benjamin Paul Blood (1832–1919, US, nf/p)
- Valerie Bloom (born 1956, Jamaica/England, p/ch/f)
- Robert Bloomfield (1766–1823, England, p)
- Blondel de Nesle (12th–13th cc., France, p)
- Charles Blount (1654–1693, nf)
- Elizabeth Blower (c. 1757/1763 – post–1816, England, nf/f)
- Léon Bloy (1846–1917, France, f/nf/p)
- Evelyn, Princess Blücher (1876–1960, England/Germany, nf)
- William Blum (1933–2018, US, nf)
- Judy Blume (born 1938, US, ch/f)
- Roy Blumenthal (born 1968, S Africa, p)
- Nicholas Blundell (1876–1960, England, nf)
- Edmund Blunden (1896–1974, England, p/nf)
- Godfrey Blunden (1906–1996, Australia, f/nf)
- Thomas Blundeville (c. 1522 – c. 1606, England, nf)
- Alfred Blunt (1879–1957, France/England, nf)
- Anthony Blunt (1907–1983, England, nf)
- Wilfrid Scawen Blunt (1840–1922, England, p/nf)
- Wilfrid Jasper Walter Blunt (1901–1987, England, nf)
- John Bly (born 1939, England, nf)
- Robert Bly (1926–2021, US, p/nf)
- Mary Bly (born 1962, US, f/nf), pseudonym of Eloisa James
- Edward Wilmot Blyden (1832–1912, Danish W Indies/Liberia, nf)
- Reginald Horace Blyth (1898–1964, England/Japan, nf)
- Daniel Blythe (born 1969, England, f/nf)
- Ronald Blythe (1922–2023, England, nf)
- Enid Blyton (1896–1968, England, ch)

== Bo ==
- Bo Yang (柏楊, 1920–2008, China, p/nf)
- James Boaden (1762–1839, England, nf/d)
- Barcroft Boake (1866–1892, Australia, p)
- Capel Boake (1889–1944, Australia, f) pseudonym of Doris Boake Kerr
- Frederick S. Boas (1862–1957, England, nf)
- Savino Bobali (1530–1585, Ragusa, nf/p)
- T. O. Bobe (born 1969, Romania, p/f/nf)
- Christian Bobin (born 1951, France, p/f/nf)
- Merlinda Bobis (born 1959, Philippines/Australia, p/f)
- Johannes Bobrowski (1917–1965, Germany, p/nf)
- Jacqueline Fatima Bocoum (living, Senegal, nf/f)
- Bragi Boddason (fl. first half of 9th c., Iceland, p)
- John Ernest Bode (1816–1874, England, nf/p)
- Jean Bodel (c. 1165 – c. 1210, France, p/d)
- Anders Bodelsen (1937–2021, Denmark, f/d)
- Barbara Bodichon (1827–1891, England, nf)
- Johann Jakob Bodmer (1698–1783, Switzerland, nf/d/p)
- Ádám Bodor (born 1936, Romania/Hungary, f)
- Milica Bodrožić (living, Yugoslavia/Serbia, nf)
- Hector Boece (1465–1536, Scotland, nf), also cited as Boethius
- Elleke Boehmer (born 1961, S Africa/England, nf/f)
- Étienne de La Boétie (1530–1563, France, nf)
- Louise Bogan (1897–1970, US, p/f/nf)
- Bogdan Bogdanović (1922–2010, Yugoslavia/Austria, nf)
- Milan Bogdanović (1892–1964, Serbia/Belgrade, nf)
- Valtazar Bogišić (1834–1908, Austrian E, nf)
- Zoran Bognar (born 1965, Yugoslavia/Serbia, p/nf)
- Ivan Bogorov (1818–1892, Bulgaria, nf)
- Geo Bogza (1908–1993, Romania, p/nf)
- Jakob Böhme (1575–1624, Germany, nf)
- Margarete Böhme (1867–1939, Germany, f/nf)
- Nicolas Boileau-Despréaux (1636–1711, France, p/nf)
- John Bois (1560–1643, England, nf)
- W. E. B. Du Bois (1868–1963, US, nf)
- William Pène du Bois (1916–1993, US, ch)
- Yve-Alain Bois (born 1952, Algeria/US, nf)
- Ralph de Boissière (1907–2008, Trinidad/Australia, f)
- Johan Bojer (1872–1959, Norway, f/d)
- Berta Bojetu (1946–1997, Yugoslavia/Slovenia, f/d/p)
- Milutin Bojić (1892–1917, Serbia/Greece, p/nf/d)
- Dragoslav Bokan (born 1961, Yugoslavia/Serbia, nf)
- Osbern Bokenam (c. 1393 – c. 1464, England, p)
- Saïdou Bokoum (born 1945, Guinea, f/nf)
- Omoseye Bolaji (1964–2022, Nigeria/S Africa, f/nf)
- Eavan Boland (1944–2020, Ireland, p/nf)
- Roberto Bolaño (1953–2003, Chile, f/p/nf)
- Justo Bolekia Boleká (born 1954, Equatorial Guinea, nf/p)
- Heinrich Böll (1917–1985, Germany, f)
- Cezar Bolliac (1813–1881, Wallachia/Romania, nf/p)
- Domokos Bölöni (born 1946, Romania, f)
- Robert Bolt (1924–1995, England, d)
- Ken Bolton (born 1949, Australia, p/nf)
- S. J. Bolton (living, England, f)
- Bólu-Hjálmar (1796–1875, Iceland, p), birth name Hjálmar Jónsson
- Godfried Bomans (1913–1971, Netherlands, nf/ch)
- María Luisa Bombal (1910–1980, Chile, f/nf)
- Rafael Bombelli (1526–1572, Italy, nf)
- Juan Antonio Pérez Bonalde (1846–1892, Venezuela, p)
- Michael Bond (1926–2017, England, ch)
- Nancy Bond (born 1945, US, ch)
- Nelson S. Bond (1908–2006, US, f)
- Ruskin Bond (born 1934, India, ch/f)
- August Bondeson (1854–1906, Sweden, f/nf)
- Jan Bondeson (born 1962, Sweden/England, nf/f)
- Ian Bone (born 1956, Australia, ch/f)
- Juan Balboa Boneke (1938–2013, Equatorial Guinea, nf)
- Raïs Neza Boneza (born 1979, Democratic R of Congo, f/p/nf)
- Amba Bongo (living, Democratic R of Congo/England, f/p)
- Elizabeth Bonhôte (1744–1818, England, f/nf/p)
- Nazi Boni (1909–1969, Upper Volta, now Burkina Faso, nf/f)
- Tanella Boni (born 1954, Ivory Coast, p/f)
- Yves Bonnefoy (1923–2016, France, p/nf)
- Leslie Bonnet (1902–1985, England, f/nf)
- Richard Bonney (1947–2017, England, nf)
- Veronica Bonilla (born 1962, Ecuador, ch)
- Charles Victor de Bonstetten (1745–1832, Switzerland, nf)
- Teresina Bontempi (1883–1968, Switzerland, nf)
- Paula Boock (born 1964, N Zealand, d/f)
- Elmi Boodhari (1908–1940, Somalia, p)
- Christopher Booker (1937–2019, England, nf)
- Luke Booker (1762–1835, England, p/nf)
- George Boole (1815–1864, England, nf)
- Mary Everest Boole (1832–1916, England, nf/ch)
- Louis Paul Boon (1912–1979, Belgium, f/p/nf)
- Kurt Boone (born 1959, US, nf)
- Andrew Boorde (c. 1490–1549, England, nf)
- Henry Ernest Boote (1865–1949, Australia, nf/f/p)
- Alan Booth (1946–1993, England/Japan, nf)
- Alison Booth (living, Australia, f/nf)
- Catherine Booth (1829–1890, England, nf)
- Charles Booth (1840–1916, England, nf)
- George Booth, 2nd Earl of Warrington (1675–1758, England, nf)
- Martin Booth (1944–2004, England, f/p/d)
- Stanley Booth (born 1942, US, nf)
- Stephen Booth (born 1952, England, f)
- William Booth (1829–1912, England, nf)
- Ivan Bootham (1939–2016, N Zealand, f/p)
- Brooke Boothby (born 1952, England, f/nf)
- Frances Boothby (fl. 1669–1670, England, d)
- Guy Boothby (1867–1905, Australia/England, f)
- Basil Boothroyd (1910–1988, England, nf)
- Diphete Bopape (born 1957, S Africa, f/d)
- Vane Bor (1908–1993, Serbia/England, nf)
- Wolfgang Borchert (1921–1947, Germany/Switzerland, nf/d)
- Henry Bordeaux (1870–1963, France, nf/f)
- Ferdinand Bordewijk (1884–1965, Netherlands, f/p)
- Petrus Borel (1809–1859, France/Algeria, f/p), pseudonym of Joseph-Pierre Borel d'Hauterive
- Tomás Borge (1930–2012, Nicaragua, p/nf)
- Johan Borgen (1902–1979, Norway, nf/f)
- Miriam Borgenicht (1915–1992, US, f/nf)
- Jorge Luis Borges (1899–1986, Argentina/Switzerland, f/nf/p)
- Gabor Boritt (1940–2026, US, nf)
- Arturo Borja (1892–1912, Ecuador, p)
- Hans Børli (1918–1989, Norway, p/f/nf)
- Bertran de Born (1140s – pre-1215, France, p)
- Nicolas Born (1937–1979, Germany, p/f)
- Ludwig Börne (1786–1837, Germany/France, nf)
- Elsa Bornemann (1952–2013, Argentina, ch)
- Péter Bornemisza (1535–1584, Hungary, nf/d)
- Jenny Bornholdt (born 1960, N Zealand, p)
- Robert de Boron (late 12th – early 13th cc., France, p)
- George Borrow (1803–1881, England, f/nf)
- Marianne Boruch (born 1950, US, p/nf)
- Anna Louisa Geertruida Bosboom-Toussaint (1812–1886, Netherlands, f)
- Juan Bosch (1909–2001, Dominican Rep., nf)
- Henri Bosco (1888–1976, France, f)
- Buddhadeva Bose (1908–1974, India, p/f/d)
- Anica Bošković (1714–1804, Ragusa, p/f)
- Herman Charles Bosman (1905–1951, S Africa, f/d)
- Käthe Bosse-Griffiths (1910–1998, Germany/Wales, nf/f)
- Nora Bossong (born 1982, Germany, p/f/nf)
- Lucy M. Boston (1892–1990, England, f/ch)
- James Boswell (1740–1795, Scotland/England, nf)
- Allan R. Bosworth (1901–1986, US, f)
- Clifford Edmund Bosworth (1928–2015, England, nf)
- J. Allan Bosworth (1925–1990, US, ch)
- Joseph Bosworth (1788–1876, England, nf)
- Abel Botelho (1855 or 1856–1917, Portugal/Argentina, d/f/nf)
- Hristo Botev (1848–1876, Bulgaria, p)
- Eugeniu Botez (1874–1933, Romania, f), pseudonym Jean Bart
- Árni Böðvarsson (1924–1992, Iceland, nf)
- Théodore Botrel (1868–1925, France, p/d)
- Anne Lynch Botta (1815–1891, US, p/nf)
- Dan Botta (1907–1958, Romania, p/nf)
- Emil Botta (1911–1977, Romania, p/nf)
- Bas Böttcher (born 1974, Germany, p)
- António Botto (1897–1959, Portugal/Brazil, p/f/ch)
- Phyllis Bottome (1884–1963, England, f)
- Gordon Bottomley (1874–1948, England, p/d)
- Alain de Botton (born 1969, Switzerland/England, nf)
- Ronald Bottrall (1906–1989, England, p)
- Hafid Bouazza (1970–2021, Morocco/Netherlands, f/nf)
- Messaouda Boubaker (born 1954, Tunisia, f)
- Anthony Boucher (1911–1968, US, f/d), pseudonym of William A. P. White
- André du Bouchet (1924–2001, France, p)
- Dion Boucicault (1820–1890, Ireland/US, d)
- Rachid Boudjedra (born 1951, Algeria, p/f/d)
- Fatna El Bouih (born 1956, Morocco, nf)
- Daniel Boulanger (1922–2014, France, f/d/p)
- Pierre Boulle (1912–1994, France, f)
- Carmen Boullosa (born 1954, Mexico, p/f/d)
- Monny de Boully (1904–1968, Serbia/France, nf/p)
- Jenny Boult (1951–2005, England/Australia, p/d), pseudonym MML Bliss
- Marjorie Boulton (1924–2017, England, nf/p)
- Douangdeuane Bounyavong (born 1974, Laos, p/f/nf)
- Outhine Bounyavong (1942–2000, Laos, f)
- Stéphane Bouquet (born 1968, France, d)
- Hédi Bouraoui (born 1932, Tunisia/Canada, p/f/nf)
- Nina Bouraoui (born 1967, France, f/p)
- Gillian Bouras (born 1945, Australia/Greece, f/nf/ch)
- John Bourchier (1467–1533, England, nf)
- Francis William Bourdillon (1852–1921, England, p/nf)
- Ali Bourequat (born 1937, Morocco/US, nf)
- Élémir Bourges (1852–1925, France, f)
- Paul Bourget (1852–1935, France, f/nf)
- John Philip Bourke (1860–1914, Australia, p)
- Henry Bourne (c. 1694–1733, England, nf)
- Stephen Bourne (born 1957, England, nf)
- Joë Bousquet (1897–1950, France, p)
- Marie Marguerite Bouvet (1865–1915, US, ch)
- Nicolas Bouvier (1929–1998, Switzerland, nf)
- Alba Bouwer (1920–2010, S Africa, ch/f)
- Sarah Bouyain (born 1968, France/Burkina Faso, nf)
- Ahmed Bouzfour (born 1954, Morocco, f)
- Ben Bova (1932–2020, US, nf/f)
- James Bovard (born 1956, US, nf)
- Avice Maud Bowbyes (1901–1992, N Zealand, nf)
- Thomas Edward Bowdich (1791–1824, England, nf)
- Elizabeth Stuart Bowdler (1717-1797, England, nf)
- Henrietta Maria Bowdler (1750–1830, England, nf)
- Jane Bowdler (1743–1784, England, p)
- John Bowdler (1746–1823, England, nf)
- John Bowdler (1783–1815, England, nf/p)
- Thomas Bowdler (1754–1825, England/Wales, nf)
- Thomas Bowdler the Younger (1782–1856, England, nf)
- Alice Bowe (born 1980, England, nf)
- David James Bowen (1925–2017, Wales, nf)
- Elizabeth Bowen (1899–1973, Ireland/England, f/nf)
- Euros Bowen (1904–1988, Wales, p)
- Geraint Bowen (1915–2011, Wales, p/nf)
- John Bowen (1924–2019, England, d/f)
- Marjorie Bowen (1885–1952, England, f/nf), pseudonym of Margaret Gabrielle Vere Long
- Ursula Graham Bower (1914–1988, England/Scotland, nf)
- Cathy Smith Bowers (born 1949, US, p)
- Emily Bowes (1806–1857, England, p/nf)
- Mary Bowes (1949–1800, England, nf)
- Tim Bowler (born 1953, England, ch)
- William Lisle Bowles (1762–1850, England, p/nf)
- Maurice Bowra (1898–1971, England, nf)
- William Binnington Boyce (1804–1889, England/Australia, nf)
- Hristo Boychev (born 1950, Bulgaria, d)
- Rosie Boycott, Baroness Boycott (born 1951, Jersey/England, nf)
- Louise Esther Vickroy Boyd (1827–1909, US, p/nf)
- Martin Boyd (1893–1972, Switzerland/Italy, f/nf/p)
- William Boyd (born 1952, Gold Coast/Scotland, f/d)
- Karin Boye (1900–1941, Sweden, p/f)
- Abel Boyer (c. 1667–1729, England, nf)
- Charles Boyle (1674–1731, England, nf)
- Charles Boyle (born 1955, England, p/f)
- John Boyle (1707–1762, England, nf)
- Kay Boyle (1902–1992, US, f/nf)
- Peter Boyle (born 1951, Australia, p)
- Roger Boyle (1621–1679, England, d/nf)
- John Boyne (born 1971, Ireland, f)
- Robert Boyle (1627–1691, Ireland/England, nf)
- Charles Vernon Boys (1855–1944, England, nf)
- John Boys (1571–1625, England, nf)
- John Boys (c. 1614–1661, England, nf)
- John Boys (1749–1824, England, nf)
- Emil Boyson (1897–1979, Norway, p/nf)
- Ágota Bozai (born 1965, Hungary, f)
- Ernest Franklin Bozman (1895–1968, England, nf)

== Br ==
- Menno ter Braak (1902–1940, Netherlands, f/nf)
- Oskar Braaten (1881–1939, Norway, f/d)
- Francis Brabazon (1907–1984, England/Australia, p)
- Poggio Bracciolini (1380–1459, Italy, nf)
- Michael Bracewell (born 1958, England, f/nf)
- Thomas Bracken (1843–1898, N Zealand, p/nf)
- Alison Brackenbury (born 1953, England, p)
- Leigh Brackett (1915–1978, US, f/d)
- Paula Brackston (living, England, f)
- Brada (1847–1938, France, f/nf)
- Jason Bradbury (born 1969, England, ch)
- Malcolm Bradbury (1932–2000, England, nf)
- Ray Bradbury (1920–2012, US, f/d)
- Mary Elizabeth Braddon (1835–1915, England, f)
- Russell Braddon (1921–1995, Australia, f/nf)
- Henry Joseph Steele Bradfield (1805–1852, England, p/nf)
- Arthur Bradford (born 1969, US, f/ch)
- Barbara Taylor Bradford (born 1933, England/US, f)
- Chris Bradford (living, England, ch)
- Ernle Bradford (1822–1886, England/Malta, nf)
- Sarah Bradford (born 1938, England, nf)
- Siôn Bradford (1706–1785, Wales, p)
- Charles Bradlaugh (1833–1891, England, nf)
- A. C. Bradley (1851–1935, England, nf)
- Charles Bradley (1789–1871, England, nf)
- Edward Bradley (1827–1889, England, f)
- F. H. Bradley (1846–1924, England, nf)
- Henry Bradley (1845–1923, England, nf)
- James Bradley (born 1967, Australia, f/p)
- Marion Zimmer Bradley (1930–1999, US, f)
- Tony Bradman (born 1954, England, ch)
- Gillian Bradshaw (born 1956, US, f)
- Henry Bradshaw (c. 1450–1513, England, p)
- Anne Bradstreet (1612–1672, England/American colonies, p/nf)
- Hilary Bradt (born 1941, England, nf)
- E. J. Brady (1869–1952, Australia, p/nf)
- John Brady (died 1814, England, nf)
- Robert Brady (1627–1700, England, nf)
- Dulce Braga (born 1958, Angola/Brazil, f)
- Rubem Braga (1913–1990, Brazil, f)
- Melvyn Bragg (born 1939, England, nf/f/ch)
- William Bragge (1823–1884, England, nf)
- Einar Bragi (1921–2005, Iceland, p)
- Steinar Bragi (born 1975, Iceland, p/f/nf)
- Mohammed Ben Brahim (1897–1955, Morocco, p)
- John Braine (1922–1986, England, f)
- Jill Braithwaite (1937–2008, England, nf)
- R. B. Braithwaite (1900–1990, England, nf)
- Oyinkan Braithwaite (born 1988, Nigeria/England, f)
- Dragomir Brajković (1947–1909, Yugoslavia/Serbia, p/nf)
- Ernest Bramah (1868–1942, England, f/nf)
- Shannon Bramer (born 1973, Canada, p)
- Mae Bramhall (1861–1897, US, nf/p)
- Bertha Southey Brammall (1878–1957, Australia, p/ch/f)
- Hanne Bramness (born 1959, Norway, p)
- Joan Bramsch (1936–2009, US, f/nf)
- James Bramston (c. 1694–1743, England, p)
- Vitaliano Brancati (1907–1954, Italy, f/d/p)
- Camilo Castelo Branco (1825–1890, Portugal, f/d/nf)
- Adolf Brand (1874–1945, Germany, nf)
- Barbarina Brand (1768–1854, England, p/d)
- Christianna Brand (1907–1988, Malaya/England, f/ch), pseudonym of Mary Christianna Milne
- Hannah Brand (1754–1821, England, p/d)
- Jo Brand (born 1957, England, nf)
- Mona Brand (1915–2007, Australia, p/d/nf)
- Fiama Hasse Pais Brandão (1938–2007, Portugal, p/d/nf)
- Raul Brandão (1867–1930, Portugal, nf)
- Georg Brandes (1842–1927, Denmark, nf)
- Mark Brandis (1931–2000, Germany, f), pseudonym of Nikolai von Michalewsky
- Arngrímr Brandsson (died 1361, Iceland, nf)
- Johanna Brandt (1876–1964, S Africa, nf)
- Willy Brandt (1913–1992, Germany, nf)
- Đorđe Branković (1461–1516, Serbia, nf)
- Đorđe Branković (1645–1711, Transylvania/Habsburg E, nf)
- Sebastian Brant (1458–1521, Germany, f/nf)
- Gerd Brantenberg (born 1941, Norway, f/d/p)
- Alice Dayrell Caldeira Brant (1880–1970, Brazil, nf)
- Di Brandt (born 1952, Canada, p/nf)
- William Branthwaite (died 1690, England, nf)
- Charles Brasch (1909–1973, N Zealand, p)
- Giannina Braschi (born 1953, Puerto Rico, p/f/d)
- Miguel Brascó (1926–2014, Argentina, nf/p)
- Ann Brashares (born 1967, US, ch)
- Deyan Ranko Brashich (1940–1919, Yugoslavia/US, nf)
- Anne-Sophie Brasme (born 1984, France, f/nf)
- Georges Brassens (1921–1981, France, p)
- Anna Brassey (1839–1887, England, nf)
- Errol Brathwaite (1924–2005, N Zealand, f/d)
- Radoslav Bratić (1948–2016, Yugoslavia/Serbia, f/d)
- Scribe Bratko (fl. 13th c., Macedonia, nf)
- Inger Bråtveit (born 1978, Norway, f/ch)
- Edgar Brau (born 1958, Argentina, p/f/d)
- Fernand Braudel (1902–1985, France, nf)
- Jacques Brault (1933–2022, Canada, p/f/nf)
- Josy Braun (1938–2012, Luxembourg, nf/d/ch)
- Axel Brauns (born 1963, Germany, nf/f)
- Anna Eliza Bray (1790–1883, England, f/nf)
- Charles Bray (1811–1884, England, nf)
- John Jefferson Bray (1912–1985, Australia, p/d)
- Bernardas Brazdžionis (1907–2002, Russian E/US, p)
- Angela Brazil (1868–1947, England, ch)
- Freda Bream (1918–1996, N Zealand, nf/f)
- Nicolae Breban (born 1934, Romania, p)
- Bertolt Brecht (1898–1956, Germany, d/p/nf)
- Lurdes Breda (born 1970, Portugal, p/ch)
- Willi Bredel (1901–1964, Germany, f)
- Gerbrand Bredero (1585–1618, Dutch Republic, p/d)
- Wallace Breem (1926–1990, England, f)
- Jean "Binta" Breeze (1956–2021, Jamaica, p)
- Petronella Breinburg (1927–2019, Surinam/England, ch)
- Sigurður Breiðfjörð (1798–1846, Iceland, p)
- Paal Brekke (1923–1993, Norway, p/f/nf)
- Toril Brekke (born 1949, Norway, f/ch/nf)
- Fredrika Bremer (1801–1865, Sweden, f)
- Ian Bremmer (born 1969, US, nf)
- Gerald Brenan (1894–1987, England, f/nf)
- Radovan Brenkus (born 1974, Czechoslovakia/Slovakia, p/f)
- Christopher Brennan (1870–1932, Australia, p/nf)
- Martin Stanislaus Brennan (1845–1927, Ireland/US, nf)
- Michael Brennan (born 1973, Australia, p)
- Sophia Elisabet Brenner (1659–1730, Sweden, nf/p)
- John Brent (1808–1882, f/nf)
- Clemens Brentano (1778–1842, Germany, p/f)
- Elinor Brent-Dyer (1894–1969, England, ch)
- Frederick Sadleir Brereton (1852–1957, England, ch)
- Jane Brereton (1685–1740, Wales, p)
- John Brereton (c. 1571/1572 – c. 1632, England, n/f)
- John Le Gay Brereton (1871–1933, Australia, p/nf/d)
- Rodica Bretin (born 1958, Romania, f/nf)
- Reginald Bretnor (1911–1992, US, f)
- André Breton (1896–1966, France, f/nf)
- Nicholas Breton (1545–1626, England, p/f)
- Willy Bretscher (1897–1992, Switzerland, nf)
- Jan Brett (born 1949, US, ch)
- Lily Brett (born 1946, Germany/Australia, f/nfp), born Lilijahne Brajtsztajn
- Richard Brett (1567–1637, England, nf)
- Simon Brett (born 1945, England, f)
- Henri Breuil (1877–1961, France, nf)
- Kwesi Brew (1928–2007, Gold Coast/Ghana, p)
- Nana Ekua Brew-Hammond (living, US/Ghana, f/p)
- George Brewer (born 1766, England, nf)
- James Norris Brewer (1777–1839, England, f/nf)
- John Brewster (1753–1842, England, nf)
- Martha Wadsworth Brewster (1710 – c. 1757, English N American colonies, p/nf)
- Francisco Manuel de Melo Breyner, 4th Count of Ficalho (1837–1903, Portugal, nf)
- Breyten Breytenbach (born 1939, S Africa/France, f/p/nf)
- Thomas Brezina (born 1963, Austria, ch)
- Shane Briant (1946–2021, England/Australia, f)
- Paul Brickhill (1916–1991, Australia, nf)
- Diana Bridge (born 1942, N Zealand, p)
- Harriet Bridgeman (born 1942, England, nf)
- Rae Bridgman (living, Canada/US, ch)
- Bub Bridger (1924–2009, N Zealand, p/f)
- Hilda Bridges (1881–1971, Australia, f)
- John Bridges (1536–1613, nf)
- Lucas Bridges (1874–1949, Tierra del Fuego/Argentina, nf)
- Robert Bridges (1844–1930, England, p)
- Victor Bridges (1878–1892, England, f/d/p)
- James Bridie (1888–1951, Scotland, d), pseudonym of Osborne Henry Mavor
- Elín Briem (1856–1937, Iceland, nf)
- Walter Brierley (1900–1972, England, f)
- Asa Briggs (1921–2016, England, nf)
- Henry Briggs (1561–1630, England, nf)
- Katharine Mary Briggs (1898–1980, England, ch)
- Robert Bright (1902–1988, US, ch)
- Cecilia Lucy Brightwell (1811–1875, England, ch)
- John Briley (1925–2019, US, d/f)
- Dougie Brimson (born 1959, England, d/nf)
- David Brin (born 1950, US, f)
- Robert Bringhurst (born 1946, Canada, p/nf)
- Tor Åge Bringsværd (1939–2025, Norway, f/d)
- André Brink (1935–2015, S Africa, f/nf/p)
- Carol Ryrie Brink (1895–1981, US, ch)
- Jan ten Brink (1834–1901, Netherlands, f/nf)
- Rolf Dieter Brinkmann (1940–1975, Germany/England, p/f/nf)
- Hesba Fay Brinsmead (1922–2003, Australia, f)
- Sophia Briscoe (fl. 1770s, England, f)
- Jacques Pierre Brissot (1754–1793, France, nf)
- Vera Brittain (1893–1970, England, nf/f)
- Rosa María Britton (1936–2019, Panama, f/d)
- Jevrem Brković (1933–1921, Yugoslavia/Montenegro, p/f/nf)
- Ivana Brlić-Mažuranić (1874–1938, Austria-Hungary/Yugoslavia)
- Adele Broadbent (born 1968, N Zealand, ch)
- Chris Broadribb (living, Australia, f/nf)
- Annette Broadrick (born 1938, US, f)
- Paula Broadwell (born 1972, US, nf)
- Hermann Broch (1886–1951, Austria/US, f)
- Edwin Brock (1927–1997, England, p)
- Geoffrey Brock (born 1964, US, p)
- William Brock (1807–1875, England, nf)
- Lina Brockdorff (1930–2026, Malta, f/d)
- William Brockedon (1787–1854, England, nf)
- Barthold Heinrich Brockes (1680–1747, Germany, p)
- Ann Brockman (c. 1600–1660, England, nf)
- Connie Brockway (born 1954, US, f)
- Max Brod (1884–1968, Austrian E/Israel, f/nf)
- Erna Brodber (born 1940, Jamaica, f/nf)
- Damien Broderick (1944–2025, Australia, f)
- Frances Freeling Broderip (1830–1878, England, ch)
- Elin Brodin (born 1963, Norway, f)
- Eve Brodlique (1867–1949, UK, Canada, US, f/nf/p)
- Joseph Brodsky (1940–1996, USSR/US, p/nf
- Leslie Brody (born 1952, US, nf)
- Sándor Bródy (1863–1924, Hungary, f)
- Suzanne Brøgger (born 1944, Denmark, f/p/nf)
- Gerald Brom (born 1965, US, f)
- Alexander Brome (1620–1666, England, p)
- Richard Brome (c. 1590–1652, England, d)
- Vincent Brome (1910–2004, England, nf/f/d)
- Louis Bromfield (1896–1956, US, f/nf)
- Eliza Bromley (fl. 1784–1803, England, f)
- John Bromley (died 1717, England, nf)
- Eleanor Bron (born 1938, England, nf)
- Władysław Broniewski (1897–1962, Poland, p)
- William Bronk (1918–1999, US, p/nf)
- Anne Brontë (1820–1849, England, f/p)
- Charlotte Brontë (1816–1855, England, f/p)
- Emily Brontë (1818–1848, England, f/p)
- Patrick Brontë (1777–1861, Ireland/England, p)
- Rhidian Brook (born 1964, Wales/England, f/d)
- Steve Brook (1934–2014, England/Australia, nf)
- Arthur de Capell Brooke (1791–1878, England, nf)
- Christopher N. L. Brooke (1927–2015, England, nf)
- Frances Brooke (1724–1789, England/Canada, f/nf/d)
- Iris Brooke (1905 – post-1967, England, nf/ch)
- Jocelyn Brooke (1908–1966, England, nf/f/p)
- John Brooke (died 1582, England, nf)
- Kate Brooke (living, England, d)
- Lauren Brooke (born 1969, US, f), pseudonym of Linda Chapman with Beth Chambers
- P. J. Brooke (born 1943 and 1951, Scotland, f/nf), pseudonym of Philip James O'Brien and Jane Brooke
- Rupert Brooke (1887–1915, England/Greece, p/nf)
- Susan Brookes (born 1943, England, nf)
- Anita Brookner (1928–2016, England, f/nf)
- David Brooks (born 1953, Australia, p/f/nf)
- Geraldine Brooks (born 1955, Australia/US, f)
- Gwendolyn Brooks (1917–2000, US, p)
- Karen Brooks (living, Australia, f)
- Kevin Brook (born 1959, England, ch)
- Max Brooks (born 1972, US, f)
- Michael Brooks (born 1970, England, nf)
- Shirley Brooks (1816–1874, England, nf)
- Terry Brooks (born 1944, US, f)
- Walter R. Brooks (1886–1958, US, ch)
- Anne Brooksbank (born 1943, Australia, d)
- Mary Anne Broome, Lady Broome (1831–1911, Australia, f/nf/ch)
- Ralph Broome (1742–1805, England, nf)
- William Broome (1689–1745, England, p)
- Brigid Brophy (1929–1995, England, f/nf)
- Hans Adolph Brorson (1694–1764, Denmark, p)
- John Brosnan (1947–2005, Australia/England, f/nf)
- Joan Brossa (1919–1998, Spain, p/d)
- Nicole Brossard (born 1943, Canada, p/f)
- D. K. Broster (1877–1950, England, f)
- Edith Yah Brou (born 1984, Ivory Coast, nf)
- Robert Barnabas Brough (1828–1860, England, p/f/d)
- Henry Brougham, 1st Baron Brougham and Vaux (1778–1868, Scotland/England, nf)
- Rhoda Broughton (1840–1920, Wales/England, f)
- Olga Broumas (born 1949, Greece/US, p)
- Jeroen Brouwers (born 1940, Dutch East Indies/Netherlands, f/nf)
- Flora Brovina (born 1949, Serbia/Kosovo, p)
- Petrus Brovka (1905–1980, Russia/USSR, p)
- Babette Brown (1931–2019, S Africa/England, nf)
- Carter Brown (1923–1985, England/Australia, f)
- Charles Brockden Brown (1771–1810, US, f/nf)
- Cornelius Brown (1852–1907, England, nf)
- Dan Brown (born 1964, US, f)
- Daniel James Brown (born 1951, US, nf)
- Deidre Brown (born 1970, N Zealand, nf)
- Diane Brown (born 1951, N Zealand, f/p)
- Eric Brown (born 1960, England, f)
- Eva Maria Brown (1856–1917, US, nf)
- Fredric Brown (1906–1972, US, f)
- George Brown (1835–1917, England, nf)
- George Mackay Brown (1921–1996, Scotland, p/f/d)
- Helen Brown (born 1954, N Zealand, nf)
- Honey Brown (living, Australia, f)
- John Brown (1715–1766, England, d/nf)
- Marc Brown (born 1946, US, ch)
- Marcia Brown (1918–2015, US, ch)
- Margaret Wise Brown (1910–1952, US, ch)
- Max Brown (1916–2003, N Zealand/Australia, f)
- Pam Brown (born 1948, Australia, nf/p)
- Pamela Brown (1924–1989, England, f/d)
- Pete Brown (born 1940, England, p)
- Pete Brown (born 1968, England, nf)
- Riwia Brown (born 1957, N Zealand, d)
- Roseanne A. Brown (born 1955, Ghana/US, f/ch)
- Sandra Brown (born 1948, US, f)
- Sterling Allen Brown (1901–1989, US, p/nf)
- Stewart Brown (born 1951, England, p/nf)
- Thomas Edward Brown (1830–1897, Isle of Man/England, p/nf)
- Tom Brown (1662–1704, England, p/nf)
- Anthony Browne (born 1946, England, ch)
- Edward Granville Browne (1862–1926, England, nf)
- Frances Browne (1816–1879, Ireland, p/f/ch)
- Gerald A. Browne (1924–2015, US, f)
- Harriet Louisa Browne (1829–1906, N Zealand, nf)
- Harry Browne (1933–2006, US, nf)
- Isaac Hawkins Browne (1705–1760, p)
- Marshall Browne (1935–2014, Australia, f)
- Moses Browne (1703–1787, England, nf)
- Robert Brown (1550s – 1633, nf)
- Thomas Browne (1605–1682, England, nf)
- Thomas Alexander Browne (1826–1915, England/Australia, f/nf), pseudonym Rolf Boldrewood
- William Browne (c. 1590 – c. 1645, England, p)
- William A. F. Browne (1805–1885, Scotland, nf)
- Dixie Browning (born 1930, US, f)
- Elizabeth Barrett Browning (1806–1861, England/Italy, p)
- Oscar Browning (1837–1923, England, nf)
- Robert Browning (1812–1889, England/Italy, p/nf)
- Alan Brownjohn (1931–2024, England, p/f)
- Orestes Brownson (1803–1876, US, nf)
- Anatole Broyard (1920–1990, US, nf)
- Heðin Brú (1901–1987, Faroe Is, f), pseudonym of Hans Jacob Jacobsen
- Aristide Bruant (1851–1925, France, p)
- Dorita Fairlie Bruce (1885–1970, Scotland, ch)
- Henry James Bruce (1880–1951, England, n/f)
- Mary Grant Bruce (1878–1958, Australia, ch)
- Mrs Victor Bruce (1895–1990, England, nf/f), born Mildred Mary Petre
- William J. Bruce III (born 1980, Canada, nf/f)
- Raymond Bruckert (born 1935, Switzerland, f/nf)
- Walter Brueggemann (born 1933, US, nf)
- Ken Bruen (born 1951, Ireland, f)
- Alyssa Brugman (born 1974, Australia, f/ch)
- Jean de Brunhoff (1899–1937, France, ch)
- Gace Brulé (c. 1160 – post-1213, France, p)
- Johan Nordahl Brun (1745–1816, Norway, p/d)
- Maria Alinda Bonacci Brunamonti (1841–1903, Italy, p)
- Marta Brunet (1897–1967, Chile, f/nf)
- Andrée Brunin (1937–1993, France, p/ch/f)
- John Brunner (1934–1995, England, f)
- Marianne Bruns (1897–1994, Germany, f/p/nf)
- Mary Brunton (1778–1818, Scotland, f)
- Steven Brust (born 1955, US, f)
- Dennis Brutus (1924–2009, S Africa, nf/p)
- Francis Bryan (c. 1490–1550, England, p/nf)
- Robert Bryan (1858–1920, Wales, p)
- Arthur Bryant (1899–1985, England, nf)
- William Cullen Bryant (1794–1878, US, p/nf)
- Alfredo Bryce (born 1939, Peru, f/nf)
- Colette Bryce (born 1970, N Ireland/England, p)
- Egerton Brydges (1762–1837, England, nf)
- Bryher (1894–1983, England/Switzerland, f/p/nf)
- Annika Bryn (born 1945, Sweden, f)
- Bill Bryson (born 1951, US, nf)
- Valery Bryusov (1873–1924, Russian E/USSR, p/f/d)
- Dragomir Brzak (1851–1905, Serbia, d/p/nf)
- Jan Brzechwa (1898–1966, Poland, p/ch)

== Bu–By ==
- Chico Buarque (born 1944, Brazil, d/nf/p)
- Kenneth C. Bucchi (living, US, nf)
- Boudewijn Büch (1948–2002, Netherlands, f/nf)
- Elizabeth Buchan (born 1948, England, nf/f)
- John Buchan (1875–1940, Scotland/Canada, f/nf)
- Dugald Buchanan (1716–1768, Scotland, p)
- Edna Buchanan (born 1939, US, f/nf)
- Robert Williams Buchanan (1841–1901, Scotland, f/d)
- Magdalene Sophie Buchholm (1758–1825, Norway, p)
- August Buchner (1591–1661, Scotland, p/nf)
- Georg Büchner (1813–1837, Germany/Switzerland, d/p/nf)
- Anne Buck (1910–2005, England, nf)
- Charles Bucke (1781–1846, England, nf/p/d)
- Anthony Buckeridge (1912–2004, England, ch)
- James Silk Buckingham (1786–1855, England, nf)
- Leicester Silk Buckingham (1825–1867, England, d)
- Nancy Buckingham (1924–2022, England, f)
- Francis Trevelyan Buckland (1826–1880, England, nf), wrote as Frank Buckland
- Raymond Buckland (1834–1917, England, nf), pseudonym Robat
- William Buckland (1784–1856, England, nf)
- Henry Thomas Buckle (1821–1862, England, nf)
- Arabella Buckley (1840–1929, England, nf)
- Vincent Buckley (1925–1988, Australia, p/nf)
- William F. Buckley Jr. (1925–2008, US, nf)
- M. L. Buchman (born 1958, USA, f/nf)
- Charles Buckmaster (1950–1972, Australia, p)
- Stefan Buczacki (born 1945, England, nf)
- David Budbill (1940–2016, US, p/d)
- Maria Elizabeth Budden (c. 1780–1832, England, f/ch)
- Jacintha Buddicom (1901–1993, England, p/nf)
- Eustace Budgell (1686–1737, England, nf)
- Algis Budrys (1931–2008, Lithuania/US, f/nf)
- Andrea Hollander Budy (born 1947, Germany/US, p)
- Aminta Buenaño (born 1958, Ecuador, f/nf)
- Gesualdo Bufalino (1920–1996, Italy, f)
- Lasha Bugadze (born 1977, USSR/Georgia, d)
- Ken Bugul (born 1947, Senegal), pseudonym of Mariètou Mbaye Biléoma
- Lindsay Buick (1866–1938, N Zealand, nf)
- Thomas Lindsay Buick (1865–1938, N Zealand, nf)
- Anne Buist (living, Australia, f)
- Teodor Bujnicki (1907–1944, Poland, p)
- Lois McMaster Bujold (born 1949, US, f)
- Austin Bukenya (born 1944, Uganda, f/nf/d)
- Charles Bukowski (1920–1994, Germany/US, p/f)
- Miodrag Bulatović (1930–1991, Yugoslavia, f/nf/d)
- NoViolet Bulawayo (born 1981, Zimbabwe/US, f)
- Mikhail Bulgakov (1891–1940, Russia/USSR, f/d)
- Vanja Bulić (born 1947, Yugoslavia/Serbia, d/nf/f)
- Fanny Bulkeley-Owen (1845–1927, Wales/England, nf)
- Jacob Breda Bull (1853–1930, Norway, f/p)
- Olaf Bull (1883–1933, Norway, p)
- Frank Thomas Bullen (1857–1915, England, f/nf)
- J. B. Bullen (living, England, nf)
- Gerald Bullett (1893–1958, England, f/nf/p)
- Margaret Bullock (1845–1903, N Zealand, nf)
- Carlos Bulosan (1913–1956, Philippines/US, f/p)
- Irinej Bulović (born 1947, Yugoslavia/Serbia, nf)
- Edward Bulwer-Lytton (1803–1873, England, f/p/d)
- Robert Bulwer-Lytton (1831–1891, England, p), pseudonym Owen Meredith
- Delfina Bunge (1881–1952, Argentina, p/nf)
- Ivan Bunin (1870–1953, Russian E/France, p/f)
- Anna Bunina (1774–1829, Russian E)
- Anna Maria Bunn (1808–1899, Australia, f)
- Basil Bunting (1900–1985, England, p)
- Eve Bunting (1928–2023, N Ireland/US, f/nf/ch)
- John Bunyan (1628–1688, England, nf/f)
- Sevim Burak (1931–1983, Turkey, f/d)
- Adda Burch (1869-1929, US, nf)
- Robert J. Burch (1925–2007, US, ch)
- Josiah Burchett (c. 1666–1746, England, nf)
- Zaza Burchuladze (born 1973, USSR/Germany, f/d)
- Katharine Burdekin (1896–1963, England, nf)
- Della Burford (born 1946, Canada, ch)
- Sheila Burnford (1918–1984, Scotland/Canada, nf)
- Gottfried August Bürger (1747–1794, Germany, p)
- Hermann Burger (1942–1989, Switzerland, p/f/nf)
- George Burges (1786–1864, England, nf)
- Mary Anne Burges (1763–1813, Scotland, nf)
- Alan Burgess (1915–1998, England, nf)
- Anthony Burgess (1917–1993, England, f/d/p)
- Gelett Burgess (1866–1951, US, nf/p)
- Melvin Burgess (born 1964, England, ch)
- Thornton Burgess (1874–1965, US, nf/ch)
- James Burgh (1714–1775, Scotland/England, nf)
- John Burgon (1813–1888, England, p/nf)
- Julia de Burgos (1914–1953, Puerto Rico, p)
- John Burgoyne (1722–1792, England, d)
- Erika Burkart (1922–2010, Switzerland, p/f)
- Alafair Burke (born 1969, US, f/nf)
- Andrew Burke (1944–2023, Australia, p)
- Edmund Burke (1729–1797, Ireland/England, nf)
- J. C. Burke (born 1965, Australia, f)
- Janine Burke (born 1952, Australia, nf/f)
- Thomas Burke (1886–1945, England, f/p/d)
- William Burke (1728 or 1730–1798, England, nf)
- Martha Burkhardt (1874–1956, Switzerland, nf)
- Francis Burleigh (fl. 1590s, England, nf)
- Michael Burleigh (born 1955, England, nf)
- Doris Burn (1923–2011, US, ch)
- Andrew Burnaby (1732–1812, England, nf)
- William Aubrey Burnage (c. 1841–1881, Australia, f/d)
- F. C. Burnand (1836–1917, England, f/d)
- Jocelyn Bell Burnell (born 1943, N Ireland/England, nf/p)
- Gilbert Burnet (1643–1715, Scotland/England, nf)
- Thomas Burnet (c. 1635–1713, England, nf)
- Alice Hale Burnett (early 20th c., US, ch)
- Frances Hodgson Burnett (1849–1924, England/US, f/d)
- Caroline Burney (fl. early 19th c., England, f), probable pseudonym
- Charles Burney (1726–1814, England, nf)
- Charles Burney (1757–1817, England, nf)
- Frances Burney (1752–1840, England, f/nf/p), commonly Fanny Burney
- Frances Burney (1776–1828, England, d)
- James Burney (1750–1821, England, nf)
- Sarah Burney (1772–1844, England, f)
- Sheila Burnford (1918–1984, Scotland/Canada, f/ch)
- John Burningham (1936–2019, England, ch)
- Joanne Burns (born 1945, Australia, p/nf)
- Robert Burns (1759–1796, Scotland, p)
- Stanley Burnshaw (1906–2005, US, p)
- John Burnside (born 1955, Scotland, p/f/nf)
- Myles Burnyeat (1939–1919, England, nf)
- James Burr (born 1971, England, f)
- Nathan Burrage (born 1971, Australia, f)
- Sophia Burrell (1753–1802, England, p/d)
- Bryan Burrough (born 1961, US, nf)
- Augusten Burroughs (born 1965, US, nf/f)
- Dillon Burroughs (born 1976, US, nf)
- Edgar Rice Burroughs (1875–1950, US, f)
- Franklin Burroughs (living, US, nf)
- Montagu Burrows (1819–1905, England, nf)
- William S. Burroughs (1914–1997, US, f/nf)
- James Burrow (1701–1782, England, nf)
- Deborah Burrows (born 1959, Australia, f)
- Andrzej Bursa (1932–1957, Poland, p/f)
- Henry Burton (1578–1648, England, nf)
- Hester Burton (1913–2000, England, ch)
- Maurice Burton (1898–1992, England, nf)
- Richard Francis Burton (1821–1990, England, nf)
- Robert Burton (1577–1640, England, nf)
- Virginia Lee Burton (1909–1968, US, ch)
- Clemency Burton-Hill (born 1981, England, nf/f)
- Charlotte Bury (1775–1861, England, f)
- Elizabeth Bury (1644–1720, England, nf)
- Helle Busacca (1915–1996, Italy, p/f/nf)
- Margaret Busby (born 1944, Gold Coast/England, nf/d)
- Olivia Ward Bush-Banks (1869–1944, US, p/d/nf), born Olivia Ward
- Aldo Busi (born 1948, Italy, f/nf)
- Akosua Busia (born 1966, Ghana/US, f/d)
- Abena Busia (born 1953, Ghana/England, nf/p)
- Akosua Busia (born 1966, Ghana/England, f/d)
- Yosa Buson (与謝蕪村, 1716–1784, Japan, p)
- Michael Busselle (1935–2006, England, nf)
- Christine Busta (1915–1987, Austria, p)
- Fatimah Busu (born 1943, Malaya/Malaysia, f/nf)
- A. J. Butcher (living, England, ch)
- Jim Butcher (born 1971, US, f)
- Alban Butler (1710–1773, England, nf)
- Catherine Butler (born 1963, England, nf/ch), initially Charles Butler
- Dorothy Butler (1925–2015, N Zealand, ch)
- Guy Butler (1918–2001, S Africa, p/nf)
- Gwendoline Butler (1922–2013, England, f)
- Joseph Butler (1692–1752, England, nf)
- Josephine Butler (1828–1906, England, nf)
- Octavia E. Butler (1947–2006, US, f)
- Samuel Butler (1613–1680, England, p)
- Samuel Butler (1835–1902, England, f/nf)
- Susan Bulkeley Butler (living, US, nf)
- Michel Butor (1926–2016, France, p/f/nf)
- Ray Buttigieg (born 1955, Malta/US, p)
- Herbert Butterfield (1900–1979, England, nf)
- Jez Butterworth (born 1969, England, d)
- John-Henry Butterworth (born 1976, England, d)
- Ignazio Buttitta (1899–1997, Italy, p)
- Anthony Butts (born 1969, US, p)
- Mary Butts (1890–1937, England, nf)
- Bertha Henry Buxton (1844–1981, England, f/ch)
- Fowell Buxton (1786–1945, England, nf)
- Nigel Buxton (1924–2015, England, nf)
- Alex Buzo (1944–2006, Australia, d/f/nf)
- Augustin Buzura (1938–2017, Romania, f/nf)
- Dino Buzzati (1906–1972, Italy, f/p/nf)
- Bwesigye bwa Mwesigire (born 1987, Uganda, nf/f)
- Betsy Byars (1928–2020, US, ch)
- A. S. Byatt (1936–2023, England, f/nf)
- Kathryn Stripling Byer (1944–2017, US, p/nf)
- Vasil Bykaŭ (1924–2003, USSR/Russia, f/nf)
- Marie Beuzeville Byles (1900–1979, Australia, nf)
- Georgia Byng (born 1965, England, ch)
- Witter Bynner (1881–1968, US, p/d/nf)
- John Byrne (born 1950, England/US, f)
- Paula Byrne (born 1967, England, nf)
- Rhonda Byrne (born 1945, Australia, nf)
- John Byrom (1692–1736, England, p/nf)
- Lord Byron (1788–1824, England/Greece, p)
- Robert Byron (1905–1941, England, nf)
- Liz Byrski (born 1944, England/Australia, f/nf)
- Ingram Bywater (1840–1914, England, nf)
- Michael Bywater (born 1953, England, nf)
