= Bosworth (surname) =

Bosworth is an English surname. Notable people with the surname include:

- Adam Bosworth, known as one of the pioneers of XML
- Alan Bosworth (born 1967), English professional boxer
- Allan R. Bosworth (1901–1986), American author and journalist who served in the US Navy
- Anne Bosworth (1868–1907), American mathematician
- Brian Bosworth (born 1965), American NFL linebacker
- Brian Bosworth (born 1976), known as one of the internet streaming pioneers
- Clifford Edmund Bosworth, British historian and orientalist
- David Bosworth (born 1947), American writer
- David M. Bosworth (1897–1979), American orthopedic surgeon
- F. F. Bosworth (1877–1958), Pentecostal revivalist preacher, advocate of divine healing, author of Christ the Healer
- Hobart Bosworth (1867–1943), Californian movie actor, director, writer and producer
- J. Allan Bosworth (1925–1990), American author
- Joseph Bosworth (scholar) (1788–1876), English scholar of the Anglo-Saxon language
- Kate Bosworth (born 1983), American actress
- Kyle Bosworth (born 1986), American football outside linebacker
- Libbi Bosworth, Americana and alt-country singer-songwriter and recording artist from Texas
- Lo Bosworth (born 1986), American television personality and author
- Louise Marion Bosworth (1881–1982), pioneering American social researcher
- Mary Francesca Bosworth, Australian criminologist who is interested in imprisonment, race, and gender
- Midge Bosworth (born 1941), former Australian racing driver
- Patricia Bosworth (1933–2020), American journalist and biographer
- R. J. B. Bosworth (born 1943), Australian historian and author
- Rhondda Bosworth (born 1944), New Zealand photographer and artist
- Roger Bosworth also Robert (1607–1660), English physician and politician
- Stanley Bosworth (1927–2011), founder of Saint Ann's School in New York City
- Stephen W. Bosworth (1939–2016), Dean of the Fletcher School of Law and Diplomacy
- Thomas Bosworth (born 1930), American architect and architectural educator
- Tom Bosworth (born 1990), British race walker who holds two British Records
- William Bosworth (died c. 1650), English poet
- William W. Bosworth (1869–1966), American architect
