= Allan Bosworth =

Allan Bosworth may refer to:

- Allan R. Bosworth (1901–1986), American author of books and magazine articles
- J. Allan Bosworth (1925–1990), his son, American author of children's adventure books
