= Bruckert =

Bruckert is a German surname. Notable people with the surname include:

- Erec Bruckert (born 1997), German bobsledder
- Ingrid Bruckert (born 1952), German field hockey player
- Raymond Bruckert (born 1935), Swiss writer

== See also ==
- Brucker
