= James Bedford (disambiguation) =

James Bedford (1893–1967) was an American psychology professor.

James Bedford or Jimmy Bedford may also refer to:

- Jimmy Bedford (1940–2009), American distiller
- Jimmy B. Bedford (1927–1990), American journalist

== See also ==
- James Benford (born 1941), American physicist
