= Bartholomae =

Bartholomae can refer to:

- Bartholomä, a municipality in the German state of Baden-Württemberg
- Christian Bartholomae, a German Indo-Europeanist
  - Bartholomae's law
- David Bartholomae (1947–2023), American scholar in composition studies.
- Joachim Bartholomae (b. 1956), German author and sociologist
- Philip Bartholomae (1880-1947), American playwright, lyricist, screenwriter, and theatre director
- Willi Bartholomae (b. 1885), German rower and Olympic athlete
- William Bartholomae Jr. (1893–1964), American sailor and oil tycoon
