= Farhad Bitani =

Afghan popularizer

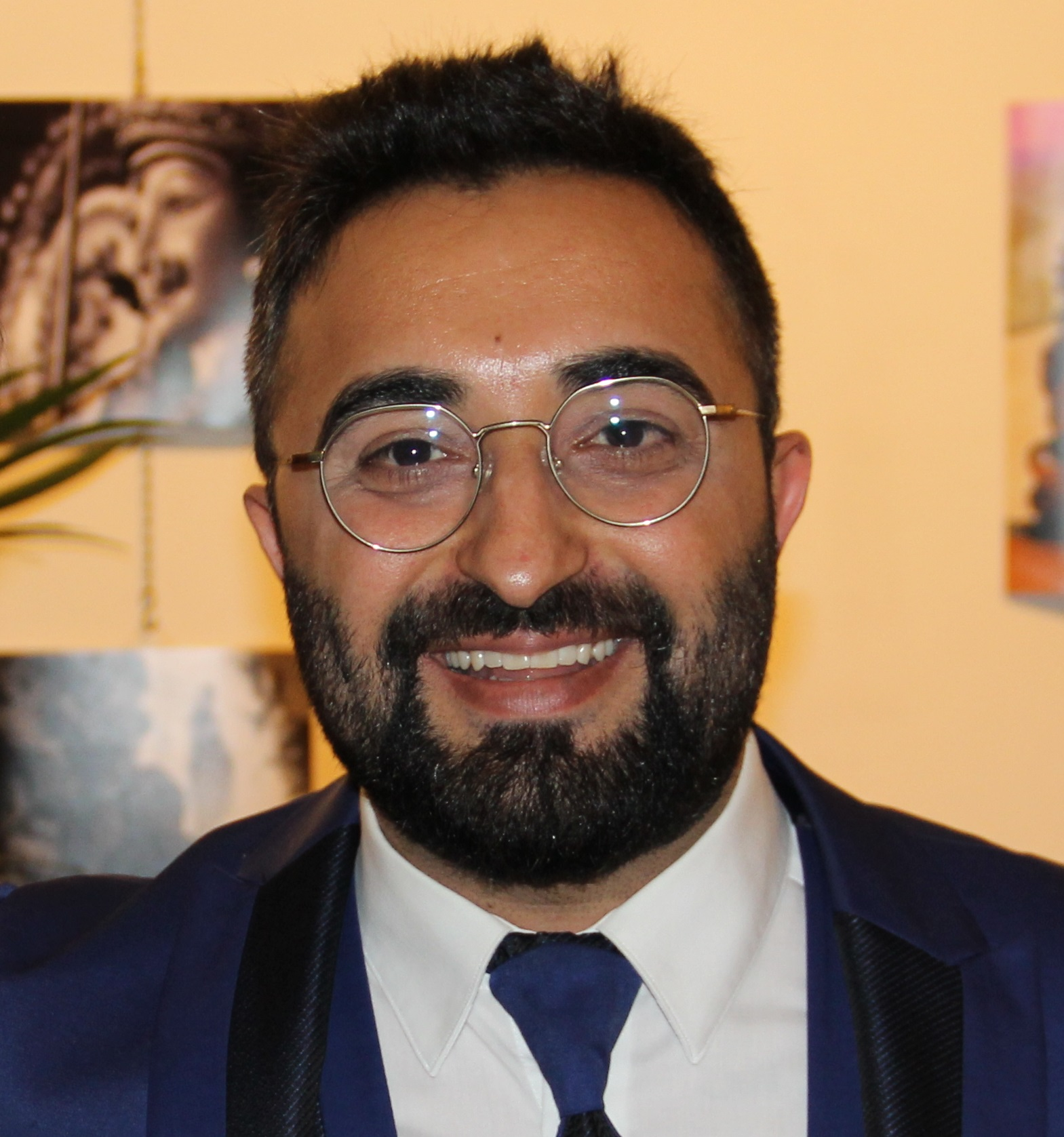
- Born: September 20, 1986 (age 39); Kabul
- Occupation: Afghan popularizer

Farhad Bitani (born September 20, 1986 in Kabul) is an Afghan popularizer. The last child of an Afghan General, Farhad served as an officer of the Afghan Army during the ISAF mission in Afghanistan. Since 2012 he was discharged to commit himself to inter-religious and intercultural dialogue.

== Biography ==
His father Mohammad Qasim Bitani is a general who fought against the Soviets to liberate Afghanistan in the '80s. Since his early years he got used to living in close contact with war through all his fathers' victories and defeats. After the downfall of Najibullah's government, his family moved to Maimana.

Since 1997, after his father was captured by the Taliban, Farhad lived in Kabul for two years with his mother and one of his brothers in extremely poor conditions.

In 1999, his father managed to escape from the prison of the Taliban in Kandahar and he moved with his family to Iran.

In 2002, when the Operation Enduring Freedom, Farhad's family moved back to Kabul.

In 2004, Farhad's father was appointed military attaché at the Embassy of Afghanistan in Italy and in 2005 his family moved to Rome.

In 2006, Farhad was admitted to the 188th course of the Military Academy of Modena; after finishing the biennium at the Accademia he moved to Turin for his master's degree at the Institute of Military Studies of the Italian Army.

In 2011, during a leave in Afghanistan, he suffered an attack by a group of Taliban. He survived the attack miraculously and began a reflection upon his life which led him to a radical change. He sought and obtained asylum in Italy, where he started work in education and interreligious and intercultural dialogue until 2018.

In 2018 the Italian playwright Roberta Colombo wrote a drama called "L'ultimo lenzuolo bianco - Il punto bianco nel cuore dell'uomo", based on Farhad's autobiography.

He is co-founder of the Global Afghan Forum, a chain of young professionals which aims to change the globe to a more educated, prosperous, safer, and just global community.

== Bibliography ==
In 2014, the Italian publisher Guaraldi printed his autobiography, L'ultimo lenzuolo bianco (ISBN 9788880499855).

In 2015, Arcipelago Edizioni printed a digest, edited by Alessandra Montesanto, which included a contribution by Farhad, Mosaikon. Voci e immagini per i diritti umani 2015 (ISBN 9788876955143).

In June 2015 Il Giornale printed "ISIS Segreto" (ASIN: B00PHHPGEG) by Matteo Carnieletto e Andrea Indini, which included an interview with Farhad.

In October 2015 Guaraldi published the English translation of his autobiography, "The Last White Sheet" (ISBN 9788869271991, ASIN: B017050YLC).

In May 2016, Fara Editore printed a digest of short stories and poetry, which includes a short story by Farhad, La mia sfida al male (ISBN 9788897441809).

In November 2016, Fara Editore printed a digest of experiences about prayer, "Preghiera (e... (ISBN 9788897441823) which includes an essay by Farhad, "Il proiettile e il punto bianco".

In February 2018, the Spanish publisher Freshbook, published the English translation of his autobiography giving it the title "La guerra no es santa - Relato del infierno muyahidin".

In October 2020, he published the new edition of his book "The Last White Sheet" (Neri Pozza), full of new content and never told.
