= Régis Bégué =

French writer (born 1970)

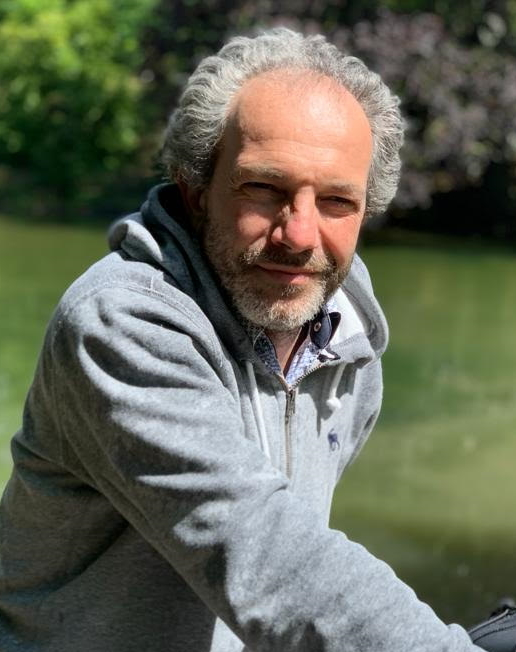
- Born: 24 August 1970 (age 56); Boulogne-Billancourt, France
- Education: HEC Paris
- Occupations: Writer; Investment manager
- Spouse: Marina Segré (m. 1994)
- Children: 3

Régis Bégué is a French writer and novelist written a number of books of fiction. He is also a Partner of Zadig Asset Management, where he manages an equity fund.

== Early life, education and family ==
Régis Bégué was born on 24 August 1970 in Boulogne-Billancourt. He is the son of Guy Bégué, Member of Parliament for Lot-et-Garonne, and Micheline Hérode-Bégué, lawyer. He is also the grandson of Camille Bégué, Member of Parliament for Tarn-et-Garonne.

In 1985, he played the role of a teenager in the short film “Charly” directed by Florence Strauss, alongside Jacques Penot and Kristin Scott Thomas. After completing high school at Lycée Saint-Louis-de-Gonzague in Paris, he studied Mathematics and graduated from HEC Paris in 1993.

He has been married to Marina (born Segré) since 1994 and has three children.

== Career ==
=== Financial career ===
He began his financial career in 1994 at Nomura Bank, where he worked as a salesman in Japanese equities and structured products. Between 1995 and 2005, he worked for Oddo Securities, specializing in European equities. In 2005, he joined Lazard Frères Gestion, where he became Head of Equity Research and Management in 2008. In 2014, he was also appointed Managing Director of the Lazard Group. He specialized in analyzing the energy and pharmaceuticals sectors. Since 2024, he has become a Partner of Zadig Asset Management where he is also the co-manager of an equity fund and equity mandates.

=== Artistic career ===
Alongside his career in Finance, he has also pursued a career as a writer. In 2000, he published his first novel, “Les Cimes ne s'embrassent pas”, set in the Alps at the end of the Great Depression. In 2004, he won a literary competition that resulted in the publication of two short stories written under the pseudonym John Murche: the book, entitled “Matière grise”, brings together the works of several writers. After a break of a few years, he published in 2013 a collection of 7 short stories entitled “Des Nouvelles de John Murche”, including his two texts published in 2004, then he gradually specialized in crime fiction. “Barbacane” (2014) is a thriller set in southwest France. This was followed by “Water Futures: L'eau n'a pas d'odeur” (2016), “S.N.O.W.” (2018) and “Fatales Négligences” (2020), crime novels set in the world of finance and business. In 2022, he published “Rodrigo”, set in 1980s France, focusing on a case of insider trading involving the CEO of a pharmaceutical company. This last novel was translated and published in English in 2022 under the name “Back to Buenos Aires”.

He also published a satirical novel in 2016, “Mon fils est de droite, mais en général les choses s'arrangent” (meaning “My son is right-wing, but things usually work out for the best”).

Aside from literature, he is also involved in other artistic activities, in particular theater, music, song-writing, singing and painting. He began playing the piano at the age of 31 and wrote several songs, some of which he composed with Emmanuel Cuche. In 2022, he performed his song “Santa Fe” in French and English, then performed it live in Sainte-Foy-Tarentaise in 2023, accompanied by cellist Gautier Capuçon. Additionally, he frequently performed in theatrical plays together with his wife, Marina.

== Filmography ==
- 1985: Charly, by Florence Strauss: a teenager

== Bibliography ==
- 2000: Les cimes ne s'embrassent pas
- 2013: Des nouvelles de John Murche
- 2014: Barbacane
- 2016: Water Futures: L’eau n’a pas d’odeur
- 2016: Mon fils est de droite, mais en général les choses s’arrangent
- 2018: S.N.O.W.
- 2020: Fatales Négligences
- 2022: Rodrigo
  - English version translated by Jason Kavett and published in 2022 under the name “Back to Buenos Aires”
