= Alice Hale Burnett =

American children's writer

Alice Hale Burnett was an American author of children's books. She is best known for writing books set in a small town called Merryvale. Her books were originally published by The New York Book Company early in the Twentieth century.

== The Merryvale Books ==
=== Boys series ===
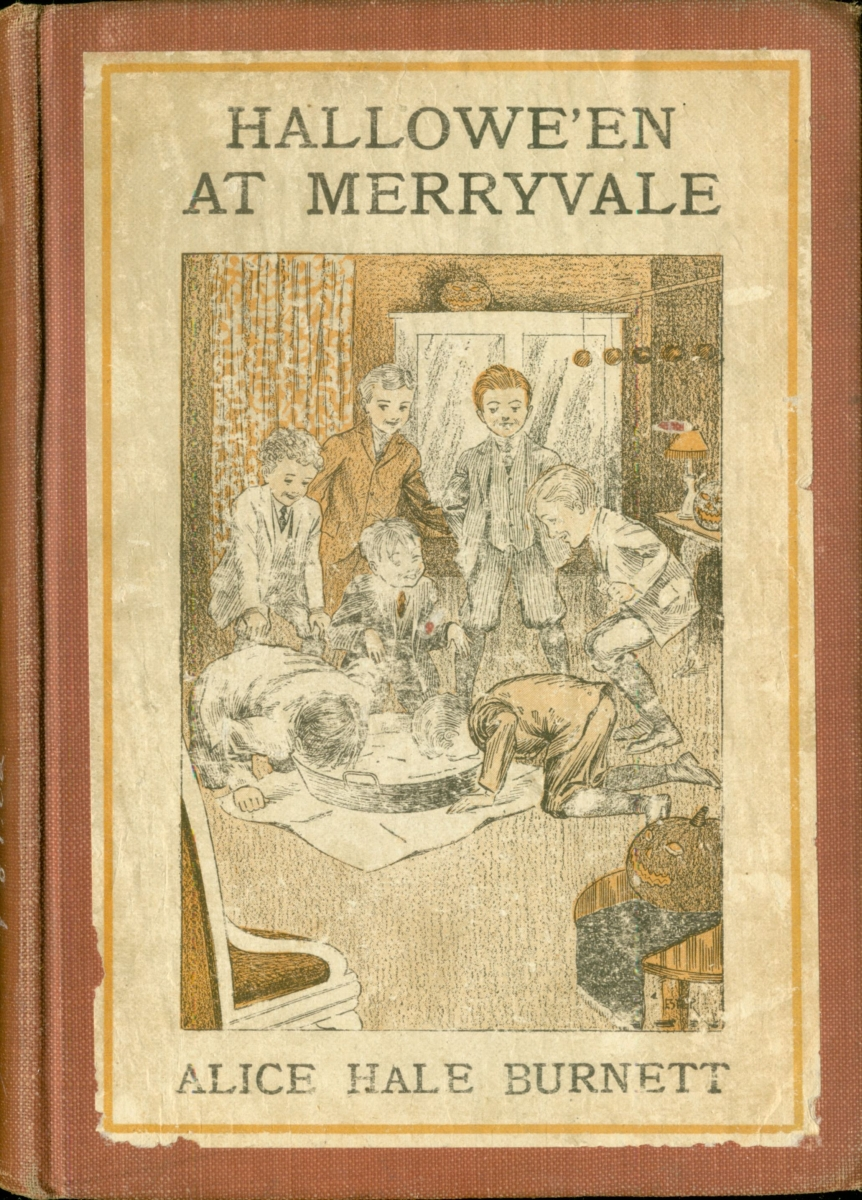
Book cover of Hallowe'en at Merryvale.

The adventures of "Toad" and "Chuck" Brown, "Fat," "Reddy" are told by Burnett in a series of books called The Merryvale Boys. According to the description on the books, this series portrays a boy's life in a small town America.

Described in the front material of one of the titles as, quote: "Stories for small boys, each complete in itself, telling about the many interesting doings of 'Toad' and 'Chuck' Brown, and their friends, 'Fat,' 'Reddy,' and others. The books are written so the boy may read and understand them; the action faithfully portrays boy life in a small town."

Titles in the series include (Plot descriptions are taken from one of the books in the series.):

- Circus Day at Merryvale

"'Toad' and 'Reddy', by good fortune, each earn two tickets to the circus, although they find watering elephants a harder task than it at first seemed."

- Father Brown's Indian Tale

"Dad's story is followed by an unexpected visitor who at first startles then interests all of the little party gathered around the fireside."

- The Picnic at Merryvale ... Also called: Picnic Day at Merryvale (1916)

"School has let out and the six merry friends decide to go fishing and have a picnic to celebrate their freedom from school. They broil the fish they catch over a camp-fire. Even though one of them gets quite wet, a good time is had by all."

- Christmas Holidays in Merryvale

"Daddy William's Toy shop is the center of interest to 'Toad' and his friends long before Christmas arrives. They plan a surprise that brings joy to a poor family. The boys build snow forts and have a royal snow-ball battle."

- Merryvale Boys on the Farm

"'Toad's' grandmother invites him and 'Reddy' to spend a month in the country. Their experiences at Sunnyside Farm, with its horse, cows, pigs and chickens, are most entertainingly told, and they have the time of their lives boating, swimming and fishing in the creek."

- Hallowe'en at Merryvale (1916)

"For many days the boys had been looking forward to the party to be held at 'Toad' Brown's house, but the evening finally arrived and a number of new games were played, although a few things happened that were not on the program."

=== Girl series ===
In the Merryvale Girl series, Burnett tells the experiences of Beth, Mary and Jerry. Titles of books in the series include:

- Beth's Garden Party
- A Day at the County Fair
- Geraldine's Birthday Surprise
- Mary Entertains the Sewing Club.
