= Kenneth C. Bucchi =

US Air force officer

Kenneth C. Bucchi was a captain in the US Air Force for six years. He fought in the Gulf War and worked four years as both a private and undercover corporate investigator. He has authored books on his experiences and holds a B.S. in Criminology and Political Science from Murray State University.

He claimed to have been a CIA narcotics officer, but this was later denied by the CIA. He previously convinced various media that his story was true, being interviewed on CNN, Greta Van Susteren's talk show, and Fox News Channel's Bill O'Reilly.

== Works ==
- Operation Pseudo Miranda: A Veteran of the CIA Drug Wars Tells All (2000)
- Inside Job: Deep Undercover As a Corporate Spy (1999)
- C.I.A.: Cocaine in America? (1994)
