= Jo Barrett =

Japanese writer

Jo Barrett is a romance author who was born in Okinawa, Japan, but she can speak only one Japanese word; Sushi.

Barrett emigrated to San Antonio, Texas, and went to the University of Texas in Austin, where she received the Normandy Scholarship. After graduating from the University of Texas, she moved to Washington, D.C., and began working as a staffer on Capitol Hill. Whilst working full-time, she received a law degree from Georgetown University. She then moved to New York City, worked momentarily at the Benjamin N. Cardozo School of Law, and began writing her first novel. She has traveled to more than seventy countries, and is a supporter of diplomacy and worldwide peacekeeping missions.

== Books ==
Jo Barrett is the author of The Men's Guide to the Women's Bathroom which was published by HarperCollins / Avon Books in 2007 and optioned by CBS and Paramount Pictures which Hollywood actor Hugh Jackman's Production Company attached to produce.
