= Libbi Bosworth =

Americana and alt-country singer-songwriter and recording artist

Libbi Bosworth (born in Dallas, Texas) is an Americana and alt-country singer-songwriter and recording artist from south Texas who rose to prominence in the mid 1990s.

== Childhood ==
Bosworth was born in Dallas, Texas, and raised in Galveston, Texas, the youngest of six. She was raised in a musical environment. Her father was a trucker who moonlighted as a honky-tonk singer, and her mother worked at an area country music station.

== Early musical career ==
Bosworth left home at the age of 16 to pursue a music education and career. She turned 17 in Beverly Hills, and worked for a short time at Francis Ford Coppola's Zoetrope Studios. In her formal education Bosworth trained with rock and jazz at the Berklee College of Music in Boston, Massachusetts. She also performed in a punk band early on.

Inspired by a Rosanne Cash tape, Bosworth went to Galveston, and then returned again to Los Angeles, which featured a burgeoning roots music scene with Lucinda Williams, Mandy Mercier, and Dwight Yoakam, among others. While in Los Angeles, Bosworth met her first husband, guitarist Bill Dwyer, and they began playing country music. One of their groups included future Austin honky-tonker Roy Heinrich.

After a brief stay in Salt Lake City, the pair settled in Austin in 1991. Two years later they relocated to Nashville. After her father's death in 1994, Bosworth and her husband returned to Central Texas.

== National airplay ==
After returning to Texas, she returned to her country roots music style as well. In 1995 she broke into national radio airplay with her contributions from two compilation albums, Austin Country Nights (Baby, Maybe Then I'll Love You) and True Sounds of the New West (It's Late). In 2002, Bosworth recorded "Palm of Your Hand" for the Happy Birthday Buck: A Texas Salute to Buck Owens compilation LP.

== Solo album period ==
In 1997, she released her debut album, Outskirts of You, containing 11 songs, of which 8 were original compositions. One of the songs on the album, "Up all Night", had been covered by Kelly Willis. The album received 4 stars from the Austin Chronicle, in a review which also said the album "serves notice that her name must be included when you discuss Austin's major country figures." The album was dedicated to her father T.P. "Bubba" Bosworth. Around that time, she met her second husband, Sam Scaief, in Austin. He was a FedEx delivery worker and she was working in an engineering firm. They had a son together, Sam Jr. That year she also reached a wide audience when in 1997 she made her singular appearance on the PBS music television program Austin City Limits which spotlighted some "Best of Austin" performers. The roots music website No Depression singled Bosworth out, writing "The surprise of night was the glowing set delivered by Libbi Bosworth. Perhaps the least-known of all the acts on the bill, she won over the crowd with her crystal clear vocals and classic Nashville-style songs."

In 2001, she released a follow-up album, Libbiville, dedicated to her mother Doris Jean. Of the album's thirteen songs, ten were original compositions, including South Texas Highway. The Austin Chronicle reviewed the album and also gave it four stars, calling it "well worth the wait".

== Later life ==
Bosworth's career began to suffer from a lingering medical condition that affected her vocal chords. In March 2013, a fire burned her home down and she lost all her possessions. She launched a GoFundMe campaign to raise money, and sent her two children to live with Scaief, who by then was her ex-husband. In May 2019, Bosworth married David Anderson, a history professor who teaches at Louisiana Tech University.

== Discography ==
- Austin Country Nights, (compilation of artists) 1995
- True Sounds of the New West, (compilation of artists) 1995
- Outskirts of You, Freedom Records, 1997 debut
- Libbiville, Stark Raving, 2001
