= Janos Bardi =

German journalist (1923–1990)

- Born: 1 January 1923; Budapest, Hungary
- Died: 1 April 1990 (aged 67); Hamburg, Germany
- Occupations: Journalist, writer
- Writing career
- Language: German
- Genres: Short stories, satire, radio drama

Janos Bardi (1923 in Budapest – 1990 in Hamburg) was a journalist and writer. He worked as a journalist until after World War II, when the authoritarian government then in power no longer allowed him to write for newspapers. He then worked as a deckhand but continued to write stories and satires, one of which caused him to be arrested. After the Hungarian Revolution of 1956, he escaped to West Germany where he found work as a journalist. Bardi continued to write short stories, radio plays, and satires for cabaret until his death in Hamburg in April 1990.

== Sources ==
- Moeller, Jack; Adolph, Winnifred R.; Mabee, Barbara; Berger, Simone (2002), Kaleidoskop (6 ed.), Boston, MA: Houghton Mifflin Company, ISBN 0-618-10312-0
