= Jimmy B. Bedford =

Jimmy B. Bedford (June 10, 1927 – 1990) was the former head of the University of Alaska Fairbanks journalism department. He is also the author of Around the World on a Nickel (1967). There is a Jimmy B. Bedford Memorial Scholarship set up in his honor. He was presented with the Howard Rock Award in 1977. He also contributed to the Concise English Afghan Dari Dictionary, revised and enlarged, with Sardar M. Ah. Sakaria of Kabul University, published in January 1973.

As a professor of journalism and photography, he was supportive of native Alaska writers: he wrote the foreword for the autobiography of Emily Ivanoff Brown ("Ticasuk").
