= Joachim Bartholomae =

German writer and sociologist (born 1956)

Joachim Bartholomae (born 1956) is a German author and sociologist.

== Life ==
After school, Bartholomae studied sociology at Bielefeld University. After graduation he worked at book publisher Männerschwarm Verlag in Hamburg.

== Works ==
- Die Engel sind echt. anthology 1994. 169 pages. ISBN 3-928983-25-3.
- Hildegard! Storno!. 1999. 207 pages. ISBN 3-928983-66-0.
- Lauter schöne Lügen. 11 love stories. 200 pages. ISBN 3-928983-80-6.
- American Love-Story. 208 pages. ISBN 3-928983-93-8.
- Hamburg mit anderen Augen. City guide for Gays. 256 pages. ISBN 978-3-939542-07-0.
- Prinzen unterwegs. reader book. 256 pages. ISBN 978-3-939542-11-7.
