= Raymond Bruckert =

Swiss writer (1935–2017)

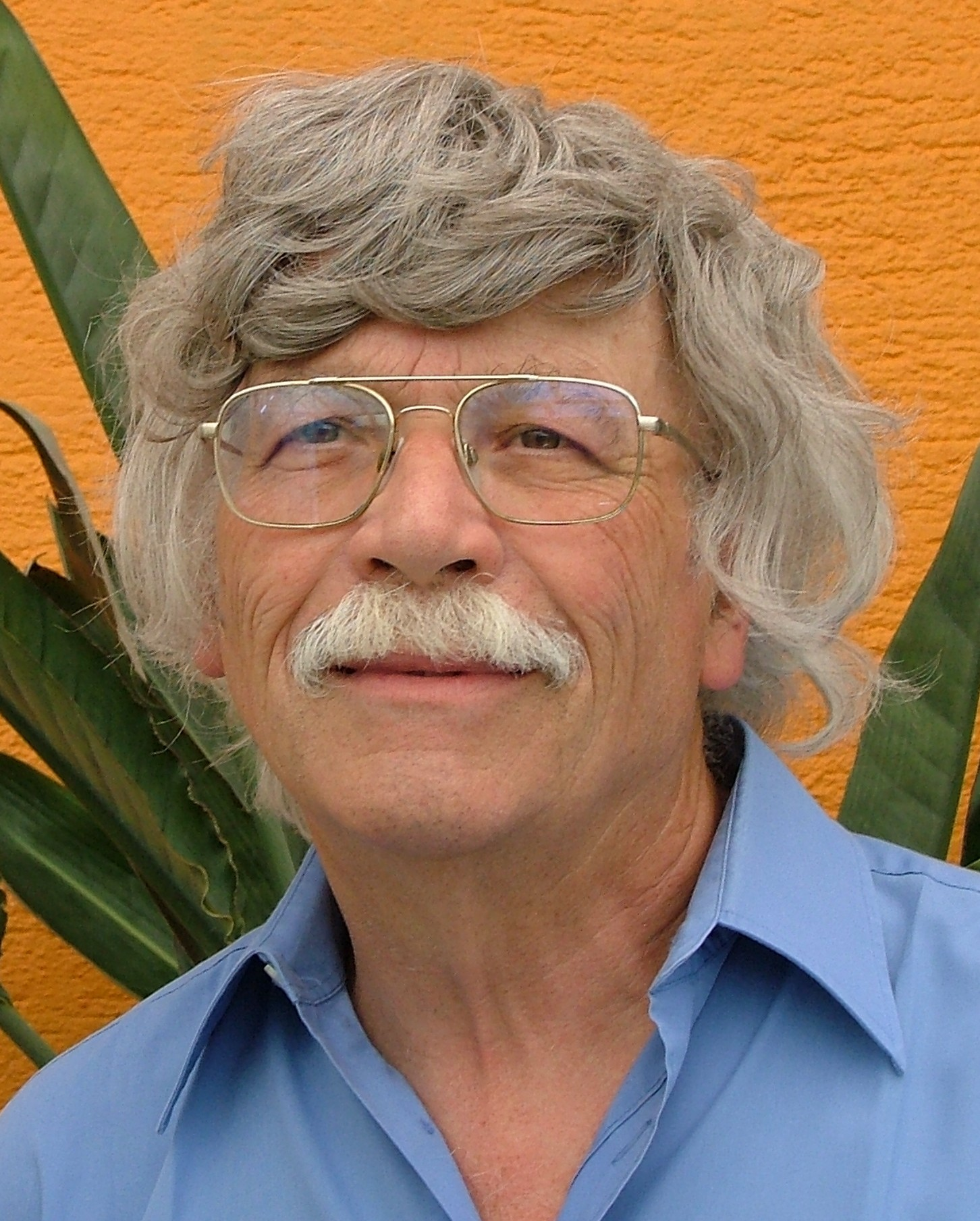
- Raymond Bruckert
- Born: November 19, 1935; Biel/Bienne, Canton of Bern, Switzerland
- Died: August 23, 2017 (aged 81); Plagne, Switzerland
- Occupation: author

Raymond Bruckert (November 19, 1935 – August 23, 2017) was an author of Swiss novels, geography textbooks for primary education, as well as other technical and educational publications. He began to write novels shortly after his retirement.

== Biography ==
A Doctor of Science from the University of Bern in geography, he is first and foremost a teacher and directs development courses, while doing research in solar energy. He began at age 18 as a teacher for all levels of the single class of Romont, a small village in the Bernese Jura Mountains. He then became the official translator in the city of Biel in charge of cultural affairs in French and municipal statistician.

In the meantime, he taught at the commercial school in Biel. School managers in Neuchâtel concluded his career as director of the school in Moutier. He is under regular review of the Jura region for the magazine Jura pluriel and is a member of the Association des écrivains neuchâtelois et jurassiens in Jura. He lives in Plagne, a village north of Romand Biel.

== Publications ==
- 1970 Bienne, son agglomération, sa région
- 1976 L'Agriculture mondiale
- 1977 L'Industrie dans le monde
- 1980 Le Soleil pour tous – Initiation of solar energy practice, Randin
- 2000 Chronique d'un grand froid, Cabédita (novel)
- 2001 Le Rire interdit : apogée et chute d'une utopie (novel)
- 2003 A la recherche du bonnet magique, Le Champ de la Draize, Plagne (novel)
- 2006 Les Veillées de jadis, Editions Intervalles, Prêles (novel)
