= Allan R. Bosworth =

American novelist

- Born: Allan Rucker Bosworth; October 29, 1901; San Angelo, Texas, U.S.
- Died: July 18, 1986 (aged 84); Salem, Virginia, U.S.
- Occupations: Author; newspaperman; naval officer
- Children: J. Allan Bosworth
- Writing career
- Pen name: Alamo Boyd

Allan Rucker Bosworth (October 29, 1901 – July 18, 1986) was an American author, newspaperman, and naval officer. He was a prolific writer of novels, short stories and magazine articles. Between 1925 and 1936 he worked at several California newspapers as a reporter and editor. He also served in the United States Navy and Navy Reserve for some 38 years.

Bosworth also wrote under the pseudonym Alamo Boyd.

== Biography ==
He was born in San Angelo, Texas, worked as a journalist in San Francisco, and served in Japan as a Naval public relations officer. He travelled extensively in Europe and the Far East, and lived in Roanoke, Virginia for most of his life. He wrote several novels and short stories in the Western fiction genre. His son Allan Bernard Bosworth is also a writer.

== Books ==
- Steel to the Sunset. Arcadia House. 1941.
- Wherever the Grass Grows. Doubleday, Doran and co. 1941.
- Full Crash Dive. Duell, Sloan and Pearce. 1942.
- The Submarine Signaled... Murder!. Select Publications. 1942. (Paperback reprint of Full Crash Dive)
- Wherever the Grass Grows. The Sun Dial Press. 1942.
- A Cabin in the Hills; illus. by David Hendrickson. Doubleday. 1947.
- Hang and Rattle. Doubleday. 1947.
- San Francisco Murders, by Allan R. Bosworth [and others] and Joseph Henry Jackson, editor. Duell, Sloan and Pearce. 1947.
- Sancho of the Long, Long Horns. Illus. by Robert Frankenberg. Doubleday. 1947.
- Bury Me Not. Doubleday. 1948.
- A Cabin in the Hills. Hammond. 1950.
- Ladd of the Lone Star; illustrated by George A. Malik. Aladdin Books. 1952.
- Ginza Go, Papa-san [by] Allan R. Bosworth. Illustrations by Jack Matsuoka. Tuttle. 1955.
- Only the Brave, an Historical Novel. Popular Library. 1955.
- The Lovely World of Richi-san. Harper. 1958.
- The Crows of Edwina Hill. Harper. 1961.
- New Country. Harper. 1962.
- Ozona Country. Harper & Row. 1964.
- Storm Tide [by] Allan R. Bosworth. Harper & Row. 1965.
- America's Concentration Camps. W. W. Norton. 1967.
- My Love Affair with the Navy, by Allan R. Bosworth. Foreword by Ernest M. Eller. Nor. 1969.
