= J. Allan Bosworth =

American novelist (1925–1990)

- Born: Allan Bernard Bosworth; July 6, 1925; San Diego, California, U.S.
- Died: May 3, 1990 (aged 64); Boston, Massachusetts, U.S.
- Occupation: Author
- Writing career
- Pen name: J. Allan Bosworth
- Genres: Children's literature; adventure fiction

Allan Bernard Bosworth (July 6, 1925 – May 3, 1990), using the pen-name J. Allan Bosworth, was an American author of children's adventure books. His father, Allan Rucker Bosworth, was also a writer.

Bosworth was born in San Diego, California in July 1925. He began writing while still a radioman aboard USS Missouri. World War II had just ended, and the ship was on her long voyage home. A native Californian, he returned to San Francisco and took a job at the Chronicle. Ten years later, having published two novels and a few dozen short stories, he left the newspaper to begin writing on a full-time basis. He lived in Salem, Virginia, the setting for All the Dark Places.

His best-known books are White Water, Still Water, about a boy stranded downriver by his raft, and All the Dark Places, about a boy lost in an Appalachian cave. White Water, Still Water was included by School Library Journal as one of the 26 best books of spring in 1966. Before developing the wilderness adventure theme, Bosworth wrote Voices in the Meadow, a fable of meadowland creatures facing dangerous predators. He died in Boston, Massachusetts in May 1990 at the age of 64.

== Bibliography ==
- A Bird for Peter, 1963, Doubleday, Criterion Books
- Voices in the Meadow, 1964, Doubleday
- White Water, Still Water, 1966, N.Y., Doubleday OCLC 519386
- All the Dark Places, 1968, N.Y., Doubleday
- A Wind Named Anne, 1970, Doubleday
- A Darkness of Giants, 1972, Doubleday
- Among Lions, 1973, Doubleday
