= List of writers by name: C =

The following is a List of writers by name whose last names begin with C:

Abbreviations: ch = children's; d = drama, screenwriting; f = fiction; nf = non-fiction; p = poetry, song lyrics

== Ca ==
- Ernesto Noboa y Caamaño (1889–1927, Ecuador, p)
- James Branch Cabell (1879–1958, US, f)
- Omar Cabezas (born 1950, Nicaragua, nf)
- Marcel Cabon (1912–1972, Mauritius, f)
- Dolce Ann Cabot (1862–1943, N Zealand, nf)
- Meg Cabot (born 1967, US, f/ch)
- Amílcar Cabral (1924–1973, Guinea-Bissau, nf)
- António Cabral (1931–2007, Portugal, p/f/d)
- Facundo Cabral (1937–2011, Argentina, nf)
- Manuel del Cabral (1907–1999, Dominican Rep., p)
- Vasco Cabral (1926–2005, Guinea-Bissau, p)
- Lydia Cabrera (1899–1991, Cuba/US, nf)
- Caroline Caddy (born 1944, Australia, p)
- Florence Caddy (1837–1923, England, nf), born Florence Tompson
- Rafael Cadenas (born 1930, Venezuela, p/nf)
- Pat Cadigan (born 1953, US, f)
- Dilys Cadwaladr (1902–1979, Wales, p/f)
- Rhys Cadwaladr (fl. 1666–1690, Wales, p/nf)
- Cædmon (fl. c. 657–684, England, p)
- Adrian Caesar (born 1955, England/Australia, f/nf/p)
- Kathleen Mannington Caffyn (c. 1855–1926, Ireland/England, f)
- Andrea Cagan (living, US, nf)
- Inès Cagnati (1937–2007, France, f)
- Neriman Cahit (born 1937, Turkey/Turkish Cyprus, nf/p)
- Cai Yan (蔡琰, c. 178 – post-206 or c. 170–215 or died c. 249, China, p)
- Cai Yong (蔡邕, 132–192, China, nf)
- Cai Xiang (蔡襄, 1012–1067, China, p/nf)
- Andrés Caicedo (1951–1977, Colombia, f/nf)
- Dominique Caillat (born 1956, US/Germany, d/nf)
- Maoilios Caimbeul (born 1944, Scotland, p/nf/ch), birth name Myles Campbell
- James M. Cain (1892–1977, US, f)
- Susan Cain (born 1968, US, nf)
- Hall Caine (1853–1931, England/Isle of Man, f/d/p)
- Janet Caird (1913–1992, Malawi/Scotland, f/p)
- Mona Caird (1854–1932, England, f/nf)
- Scott Cairns (born 1954, Scotland, p/nf)
- John Caius the Elder (fl. 1480, England, p)
- Aleksandrs Čaks (1901–1950, Russian E/USSR, p/f)
- Louis Calaferte (1928–1994, Italy/France, f/nf/p)
- Susana Calandrelli (1901–1978, Argentina, p/f/nf)
- Alison Calder (born 1969, England/Canada, p/nf)
- Angus Calder (1942–2008, England/Scotland, nf/p)
- Pedro Calderón de la Barca (1600–1681, Spain, d/p/nf)
- Erskine Caldwell (1903–1987, US, f/nf)
- Musa Cälil (1906–1944, USSR, p/d/nf)
- George Călinescu (1899–1965, Romania, nf/f)
- Matei Călinescu (1934–2009, Romania/US, nf)
- Susanna Calkins (born 1971, US, f/nf)
- Barry Callaghan (born 1937, Canada, f/p/nf)
- Morley Callaghan (1903–1990, Canada, f/d)
- Michael Feeney Callan (living, Ireland, f/p/d)
- Callimachus (c. 310/305 – c. 240 BCE, Cyrene, p/nf)
- Brian Callison (1934–2024, England/Scotland, f)
- Philip Callow (1924–2007, England, f/p/nf)
- Mena Calthorpe (1905–1996, Australia, f)
- Pilar Calveiro (born 1953, Argentina/Mexico, nf)
- Charles Stuart Calverley (1831–1884, England, p)
- Robert Calvert (1945–1988, S Africa, p/d/f)
- César Calvo (1940–2000, Peru, p/f/nf)
- Eugenio Cambaceres (1843–1888, Argentina, f)
- Roland Camberton (1921–1965, England, f), real name Henry Cohen
- Ada Cambridge (1844–1926, England/Australia, f/p/nf)
- William Camden (1551–1623, England, nf)
- Eleanor Cameron (1912–1996, Canada/US, ch/nf)
- Margaret Cameron (1867–1947, US, d/f/nf)
- Norman Cameron (1905–1953, India/Scotland, p)
- Richard Cameron (born 1948, England, d)
- Andrea Camilleri (1925–2019, Italy, f/nf)
- Héctor Aguilar Camín (born 1946, Mexico, nf)
- Adolfo Caminha (1867–1897, Brazil, f/nf)
- Émile Cammaerts (1878–1953, Belgium/England, d/p)
- Luís de Camões (1524 or 1525–1580, Portugal, p)
- Candace Camp (born 1949, US, f)
- Cordelia Camp (1884–1973, US, nf)
- Kate Camp (born 1972, N Zealand, p/nf)
- L. Sprague de Camp (1907–2000, US, f/nf)
- Alexander Campbell (1788–1866, Ireland/US, nf)
- Alistair Campbell (1925–2009, N Zealand, p/d/f)
- Angus Peter Campbell (born 1952, Scotland, p/f/nf)
- Archibald Campbell (fl. 1767, Scotland, nf)
- Beatrix Campbell (born 1947, England, nf)
- Bruce Campbell (1912–1993, England, nf)
- David Campbell (1915–1979, Australia, p/f/nf)
- Elizabeth Campbell (born 1989, Australia, p)
- Joanna Campbell (fl. late 20th c., US, ch)
- John Colin Campbell, 1st Viscount Davidson (1889–1970, Scotland, nf)
- John W. Campbell Jr. (1910–1971, US, f), pseudonym, Don A. Stuart
- Judy Campbell (1916–2004, England, d)
- Marion May Campbell (born 1948, Australia, f/p/nf)
- Mary Maxwell Campbell (1812–1886, Scotland, p)
- Meg Campbell (1937–2007, N Zealand, p)
- Ramsey Campbell (born 1946, England, f/nf)
- Roy Campbell (1901–1957, S Africa/Portugal, p/nf)
- Thomas Campbell (1777–1844, Scotland/France, p)
- Rachel Campbell-Johnston (born 1963, England, nf/f)
- Joachim Heinrich Campe (1746–1818, Germany, nf/ch)
- Jan Campert (1902–1943, Netherlands, p), Holocaust victim
- Remco Campert (1929–2022, Netherlands, f/p)
- Thomas Campion (1567–1620, England, p/nf)
- Estanislao del Campo (1834–1880, Argentina, p)
- José María del Campo (1826–1884, Argentina, nf)
- Nellie Campobello (1900–1986, Mexico, nf/p/f)
- Augusto de Campos (born 1931, Brazil, p/nf)
- Haroldo de Campos (1929–2003, Brazil, p/nf)
- Francis Camps (1905–1972, England, nf)
- Albert Camus (1913–1960, Algeria/France, f/nf)
- Matilde Camus (1919–2012, Spain, nf)
- Mirel Cană (1957–2020, Romania, f), pseudonym Șerban Alexandru
- Nemesio Canales (1878–1923, Puerto Rico, nf/f/d)
- W. H. Canaway (1925–1988, England, f)
- Melville Henry Cane (1879–1980, US, p/nf)
- Hugh Candidus (c. 1095 – c. 1160, England, nf)
- Elias Canetti (1905–1994, Bulgaria/Switzerland, f/d/nf)
- Jack Canfield (born 1944, US, nf),
- Ethan Canin (born 1960, US, f)
- Ivan Cankar (1876–1918, Austrian E, d/p/nf)
- Denis Cannan (1919–2011, England, d)
- Gilbert Cannan (1884–1955, England, f/d)
- Joanna Cannan (1896–1961, England, f/ch)
- May Wedderburn Cannan (1893–1973, England, p)
- Dorothy Cannell (born 1943, England/US, f)
- Victor Canning (1911–1986, England, f)
- James Cañón (living, Colombia/US, f/nf)
- Edip Cansever (1928–1986, Turkey, p)
- Constantin Cantacuzino (1639–1716, Wallachia, nf)
- Dimitrie Cantemir (1673–1723, Moldavia, nf)
- William Canton (1845–1926, England, p/ch/nf)
- Cao Cao (曹操, c. 155–220, China, p/nf)
- Cao Pi (曹丕, c. 187–226, China, p/nf)
- Cao Wenxuan (曹文軒, born 1954, China, f/ch)
- Cao Xueqin (曹雪芹, 1715 or 1724 – 1763 or 1764, China, f)
- Cao Yu (曹禺, 1910–1996, China, d)
- Cao Zhi (曹植, 192–232, China, p)
- Martín Caparrós (born 1957, Argentina, f/nf)
- Karel Čapek (1890–1938, Austria-Hungary/Czechoslovakia, f/d/nf)
- Edward Capell (1713–1781, England, nf)
- Martianus Capella (fl. c. 410–420, Roman E, nf)
- Edward Capern (1819–1894, England, p)
- John Capgrave (1393–1464, England, nf)
- Vahni Capildeo (born 1973, Jamaica/England, p/nf/d)
- Jacobus Capitein (c. 1717–1747, Gold Coast/Netherlands, nf)
- Truman Capote (1924–1984, US, f/d)
- Ivan Čapovski (born 1936, Greece/N Macedonia, p/f)
- Placide Cappeau (1808–1877, France, p)
- Philip Caputo (1941–2026, US, f/nf)
- Aleš Čar (born 1971, Yugoslavia/Slovenia, f)
- Caradoc of Llancarfan (12th c., Wales, nf)
- Ionuț Caragea (born 1975, Romania, p)
- Ion Luca Caragiale (1852–1912, Wallachia/Germany, d/f/p)
- Mateiu Caragiale (1885–1936, Romania, p/f/nf)
- Marie-Magdeleine Carbet (1902–1996, Martinique, p/f)
- Raffaello Carboni (1817–1875, Italy, nf)
- Ramón J. Cárcano (1860–1946, Argentina, nf)
- Adolphe Joseph Carcassonne (1826–1891, France, p/d)
- Francis Carco (1886–1958, New Caledonia/France, p/f/d)
- Orson Scott Card (born 1951, US, f)
- Gerolamo Cardano (1501–1576, Italy, nf)
- William Cardell (1780–1828, US, ch/nf)
- Ernesto Cardenal (1925–2020, Nicaragua, p/nf)
- Lúcio Cardoso (1912–1968, Brazil, f/d/p)
- Miguel Esteves Cardoso (born 1955, Portugal/England, nf/f)
- Giosuè Carducci (1835–1907, Italy, p/nf)
- Neville Cardus (1888–1975, England, nf)
- Maurice Carême (1899–1978, Belgium, p/ch)
- Jan Carew (1920–2012, British Guiana/US, f/d/p)
- Thomas Carew (1595–1640, England, p)
- Henry Carey (1687–1743, England, p/d)
- Mary Carey, Lady Carey (c. 1609 – c. 1680, England, p/nf)
- Peter Carey (born 1943, Australia, f)
- Rosa Nouchette Carey (1840–1909, England, ch/f)
- Eric Carle (1929–2021, US, ch)
- Philip Carr-Gomm (born 1955, England, nf)
- Eric Carle (1929–2021, US, ch)
- Erwin Carlé (1876–1923, Germany, f)
- William Carleton (1794–1869, Ireland, nf/f)
- Robert Carliell (died c. 1622, England, p)
- Richard Carlile (1790–1843, England, nf)
- George Carlin (1937–2008, US, nf)
- Finn Carling (1925–2004, Norway, f/d/p)
- Patricia Carlon (1927–2002, Australia, f)
- Camilla Carlson (1930–1990, Norway, p/f/nf)
- Natalie Savage Carlson (1906–1997, US, ch)
- Alexander Carlyle (1722–1805, Scotland, nf)
- Joseph Dacre Carlyle (1758–1804, England, nf)
- Liz Carlyle (born 1958, US, f)
- Thomas Carlyle (1795–1881, Scotland/England, nf)
- Bliss Carman (1861–1929, Canada/US, p)
- Amy Carmichael (1867–1951, Ireland/India, nf)
- Jennings Carmichael (1867–1904, Australia/England, p/nf)
- Stokely Carmichael (1941–1998, Trinidad/Guinea, nf)
- Simon Carmiggelt (1913–1987, Netherlands, nf/p)
- Isobelle Carmody (born 1958, Australia, f/ch)
- Pedro Carmona-Alvarez (born 1972, Chile/Norway, f/p)
- John Carne (1789–1844, England, nf)
- Robert Caro (born 1935, US, nf)
- Hans Carossa (1878–1956, Germany, f/p)
- Otto Maria Carpeaux (1900–1978, Austria/Brazil, nf)
- Bo Carpelan (1926–2011, Finland, p/f)
- David Carpenter (born 1947, England, nf)
- Edmund Snow Carpenter (1922–2011, US, nf)
- Edward Carpenter (1844–1929, England, nf/p)
- Humphrey Carpenter (1946–2005, England, nf)
- Alejo Carpentier (1904–1980, Cuba, f/nf)
- Luzmila Carpio (born 1949, Bolivia, p)
- Clyde Carr (1886–1962, N Zealand, nf/p)
- E. H. Carr (1892–1982, England, nf)
- Fern G. Z. Carr (born 1956, Canada, p/nf)
- J. L. Carr (1912–1994, England, f/ch)
- John Dickson Carr (1906–1977, US, f)
- Margaret Carr (born 1935, England, f)
- Philippa Carr (1906–1993, England, f), pseudonym of Eleanor Burford Hibbert
- Raymond Carr (1919–2015, England, nf)
- Robyn Carr (living, US, f)
- Terry Carr (1937–1987, US, f)
- Virginia Spencer Carr (1929–2012, US, nf)
- Salaan Carrabey (1864–1943, Isaaq Sultanate/Somaliland, p)
- Tomás Carrasquilla (1858–1940, Colombia, f/nf)
- John le Carré (1931–2020, England, f), pseudonym of David John Moore Cornwell
- Julio Carreras (born 1949, Argentina, f)
- Evaristo Carriego (1883–1912, Argentina, p)
- Leonora Carrington (1917–2011, England/Mexico, f)
- Alejandro Carrión (1915–1992, Ecuador, p/f/nf)
- Benjamín Carrión (1897–1979, Ecuador, nf)
- Jim Carroll (1949–2009, US, nf/p)
- Lewis Carroll (1832–1898, England, p/ch), pseudonym of Charles Lutwidge Dodgson
- Hayden Carruth (1921–2008, US, p/nf)
- A. J. Carruthers (living, Australia, p/nf)
- Anne Carson (born 1950, Canada, p/nf)
- Ann Elizabeth Carson (1929–2023, Canada, p/f)
- Harold H. Carstens (1925–2009, US, nf)
- Catherine Carswell (1879–1946, Scotland, f/nf)
- Mircea Cărtărescu (born 1956, Romania, f/p/nf)
- Thomas Carte (1686–1754, England, nf)
- Ally Carter (born 1974, US, f/ch)
- Angela Carter (1940–1992, England, f/nf/p)
- Anne Laurel Carter (born 1953, Canada, ch)
- Elizabeth Carter (1717–1806, England, p/nf)
- George Stuart Carter (1893–1969, England, nf)
- Jared Carter (born 1939, US, p)
- Lin Carter (1930–1988, US, f/p)
- Martin Carter (1927–1997, British Guiana/Guyana, p/nf)
- Peter Carter (1929–1999, England/Germany, ch)
- Barbara Cartland (1901–2000, England, f)
- Emma de Cartosio (1928–2013, Argentina/France, nf/f/p)
- George Cartwright (1739/1740–1819, England, nf)
- Justin Cartwright (1943–2018, S Africa/England, f)
- Thomas Cartwright (c. 1535–1603, England, nf)
- William Cartwright (1611–1643, England, p/d)
- Jeffrey Carver (1949–2026, US, f)
- Raymond Carver (1938–1988, US, f/p)
- Alice Cary (1820–1871, US, p)
- Elizabeth Cary, Viscountess Falkland (1585–1639, England, p/d/nf)
- Henry Francis Cary (1772–1844, England, nf)
- Kate Cary (born 1967, England, f)
- Lucius Cary, 2nd Viscount Falkland (c. 1610–1643, England, nf/p)
- Phoebe Cary (1824–1871, US, p)
- Patrick Cary (c. 1623–1657, England, p)
- John Caryll (1625–1711, England, d/p)
- Julián del Casal (1863–1893, Cuba, p)
- Adolfo Bioy Casares (1914–1999, Argentina, f/nf)
- Matilde Casazola (born 1942, Bolivia, p)
- Marietta Stanley Case (1845–1900, US, p)
- Adelaide Casely-Hayford (1868–1960, Sierra Leone/England, f/nf)
- Gladys Casely-Hayford (1904–1950, Gold Coast/Sierra Leone, p)
- Gus Casely-Hayford (born 1964, England, nf)
- J. E. Casely Hayford (1866–1930, Gold Coast, nf/f)
- Juanita Casey (1925–2012, England, p/d/f), original name Joy Barlow
- Maie Casey, Baroness Casey (1892–1983, Australia, p/nf)
- Deirdre Cash (1924–1963, Australia, f), pseudonym Criena Rohan
- Johnny Cash (1932–2003, US, p)
- John Carter Cash (born 1970, US, p)
- June Carter Cash (1929–2003, US, p)
- Kristin Cashore (born 1976, US, ch/f)
- Linda Ty Casper (born 1931, Philippines, f)
- Zoë Cass (1916–2002, Scotland/England, f), pseudonym of Lois Dorothea Low
- Neal Cassady (1926–1968, US/Mexico, p/nf)
- Cyrus Cassells (born 1957, US, p)
- Lorna Casselton (1938–2014, England, nf)
- Cathy Cassidy (born 1962, England, f/ch)
- Carlos Castaneda (1925–1998, Peru/US, nf)
- Fernão Lopes de Castanheda (c. 1500–1559, Portugal, nf)
- Lisa Castel (born 1955, Angola, nf/p)
- Leonardo Castellani (1899–1981, Argentina, nf/f/p)
- Rosario Castellanos (1925–1974, Mexico, p/nf)
- Ignaz Franz Castelli (1780–1862, Austria, d/p)
- Blanca Castellón (born 1958, Nicaragua, p)
- Almucs de Castelnau (c. 1140 – pre-1184, France, p)
- António Feliciano de Castilho (1800–1875, Portugal, p/nf)
- Abelardo Castillo (1935–2017, Argentina, f/nf)
- Ana Castillo (born 1953, US, f/p/d)
- Carlos Eduardo Jaramillo Castillo (born 1932, Ecuador, p)
- Julio Valle Castillo (born 1952, Nicaragua, p/nf)
- Roberto Castillo (1950–2008, Honduras, f/nf)
- Sergio Badilla Castillo (born 1947, Chile, p)
- Egerton Castle (1858–1920, England, f/nf)
- Elisabeth Castonier (1894–1975, Germany/England, ch/nf)
- Helen Castor (born 1968, England, nf)
- Eugénio de Castro (1869–1944, Portugal, p)
- Ferreira de Castro (1898–1974, Portugal, f/nf)
- Nelson Castro (born 1955, Argentina, nf)
- Públia Hortênsia de Castro (1548–1595, Portugal, nf)
- Rosalía de Castro (1837–1885, Spain, f/p)
- Kole Čašule (1921–2009, Yugoslavia/N Macedonia, d/nf/f)
- Nick Catalano (born 1939, US, nf)
- Lee Cataldi (born 1942, Australia, p)
- Dušan Čater (born 1968, Yugoslavia/Slovenia, f/ch)
- Willa Cather (1873–1947, US, f)
- Christopher Catherwood (born 1955, England/US, nf)
- Christine Cole Catley (1922–2011, N Zealand, nf)
- Nancy Cato (1917–2000, Australia, f/nf/p)
- Ken Catran (born 1944, N Zealand, ch/d)
- Jacob Cats (1577–1660, Netherlands, p)
- Eleanor Catton (born 1985, N Zealand, f/d)
- Catullus (c. 84 – c. 54 BCE, Rome, p)
- Sarah Caudwell (1939–2000, England, f), pseudonym of Sarah Cockburn
- Charles Causley (1917–2003, England, p/nf/ch)
- David Caute (born 1936, Egypt/England, f/d/nf)
- Constantine P. Cavafy (1863–1933, Ottoman E/Egypt, p)
- Guido Cavalcanti (c. 1250/1259–1300, Italy, p)
- Bonaventura Cavalieri (1598–1647, Italy, nf)
- Tiberius Cavallo (1749–1809, Italy/England, nf)
- Jeanne de Cavally (1926–1992, Ivory Coast, ch)
- Nick Cave (born 1957, Australia, p/d)
- Clare Cavendish (fl. 20th c., England, f)
- George Cavendish (1497 – c. 1562, England, nf)
- Jane Cavendish (1621–1669, England, p/d)
- Margaret Cavendish, Duchess of Newcastle-upon-Tyne (1623–1673, England, p/nf/f)
- William Cavendish (1593–1676, England, nf)
- Hannah Rebecca Frances Caverhill (1834–1897, N Zealand, nf)
- William Caxton (c. 1422 – c. 1491, England, nf)
- Germán Castro Caycedo (1940–2021, Colombia, nf)
- Jean Cayrol (1911–2005, France, p), Holocaust survivor
- Henri Cazalis (1840–1909, France/Switzerland, p/nf), pseudonym Jean Lahor
- Denys Cazet (born 1938, US, ch)

== Ce–Ch ==
- Chin Ce (born 1966, Nigeria, p/f/nf)
- Lord David Cecil (1902–1986, England, nf)
- Camilla Ceder (born 1976, Sweden, f)
- Siv Cedering (1939–2007, Sweden/US, p/f)
- Charlotta Cederström (1760–1832, Sweden, p/f)
- Hassoum Ceesay (born 1971, Gambia, nf)
- Camilo José Cela (1916–2002, Spain, f/p/nf)
- Peride Celal (1916–2013, Turkey, f)
- Paul Celan (1920–1970, Romania/France, p)
- Gianni Celati (1937–2022, Italy, f/nf)
- Dorothea Celesia (1738–1790, England/Italy, d/p)
- Louis-Ferdinand Céline (1894–1961, France, f/nf)
- Conrad Celtes (1459–1508, Germany/Austria, nf/p)
- Blaise Cendrars (1887–1961, Switzerland/France, f/p), pseudonym of Frédéric-Louis Sauser
- Susanna Centlivre (1669–1723, England, p/d)
- Thomas Centolella (living, US, p)
- Avanti Centrae (living, US, f)
- Hitesh Ceon (born 1974, Iceland, p)
- C. W. Ceram (1915–1972, Germany, nf), pseudonym of Karl Wilhelm Marek
- Anica Černej (1900–1944, Slovenia, nf/p), Holocaust victim
- Luis Cernuda (1902–1963, Spain/Mexico, nf/p)
- Elio Lampridio Cerva (1463–1520, Ragusa, p)
- Miguel de Cervantes (1547–1616, Spain, f)
- Juraj Červenák (born 1974, Czechoslovakia/Slovakia, f)
- Aimé Césaire (1913–2008, Martinique, p/nf)
- Ana Cristina Cesar (1952–1983, Brazil, p/nf)
- Mário Cesariny de Vasconcelos (1923–2006, Portugal, p)
- Gilbert Cesbron (1913–1979, France, f)
- Roderich Cescotti (1919–2015, Germany, nf)
- Úrsula Céspedes (1832–1874, Cuba, p)
- Steph Cha (born 1986, US, f)
- Michael Chabon (born 1963, US, f/nf)
- Angie Chabram-Dernersesian (born 1952, US, nf)
- Mark Chadbourn (born 1960, England, f/nf)
- Laurence Chaderton (c. 1536–1640, England, nf)
- David Chadwick (1926–2020, US, nf)
- Henry Chadwick (1920–2008, England, nf)
- Ezra Chadza (1823–1885, Nyasaland/Malawi, p/nf)
- Mohamed Chafik (born 1926, Morocco, nf)
- Nadia Chafik (born 1962, Morocco, f)
- Aïcha Chaibi (Tunisia, nf)
- Patrick Fani Chakaipa (1932–2003, S Rhodesia/Zimbabwe)
- Chakhrukhadze (fl. late 12th/early 13th c, Georgia, p)
- Ashok Chakradhar (born 1951, India, d/ch/p)
- Jack L. Chalker (1944–2005, US, f)
- John Chalkhill (fl. c. 1600, England, p)
- Gordon Challis (1932–2018, N Zealand, p)
- John Armstrong Chaloner (1862–1935, US, nf/p/d)
- Thomas Chaloner (1521–1565, England, p)
- Ján Chalupka (1791–1871, Austria-Hungary/Hungary, d/nf)
- Samo Chalupka (1812–1883, Austria-Hungary/Hungary, p)
- Roja Chamankar (born 1981, Iran, p)
- Brenda Chamberlain (1912–1971, Wales, p/f)
- Edward Chamberlayne (1616–1703, England, nf)
- William Chamberlayne (1619–1679 or 1689, England, p)
- Shaun Chamberlin (living, England, nf)
- Aidan Chambers (1934–2025, England, ch)
- Ephraim Chambers (c. 1680–1740, England, nf)
- Frederick Chamier (1796–1870, England, f/nf)
- Adelbert von Chamisso (1781–1838, France/Germany, p/f/nf)
- Patrick Chamoiseau (born 1953, Martinique, f/d/ch)
- Meira Chand (born 1942, England, f)
- A. Bertram Chandler (1912–1984, England/Australia, f)
- Catherine Chandler (born 1950, US/Canada, p)
- Elizabeth Margaret Chandler (1807–1834, US, p/nf)
- Jessie Chandler (born 1968, US, f)
- Mary Chandler (1687–1745, England, p)
- Raymond Chandler (1888–1959, US/England, f)
- Samuel Chandler (1693–1766, England, nf)
- Neelam Saxena Chandra (born 1969, India, ch/p)
- Chang Ch'ung-ho (張充和, 1914–2015, China/US, p)
- Diana Chang (張粲芳, 1924–2009, US, f/p)
- Eileen Chang (张爱玲, 1920–1995, China/US, nf/f)
- Chang Hsin-hai (張歆海, 1898–1972, China, nf)
- Iris Chang (张纯如, 1968–2004, Taiwan/US, nf)
- Jung Chang (張戎, born 1952, China/England, nf)
- Colin Channer (born 1963, Jamaica, f)
- William Ellery Channing (1880–1942, US, nf)
- William Ellery Channing (1818–1901, p)
- Henry Channon (1897–1958, US/England, nf/f)
- Scott Chantler (born 1972, Canada, ch)
- Lynda Chanwai-Earle (born 1965, N Zealand, d/p)
- Jean Chapelain (1595–1674, France, p/nf)
- Jean de la Chapelle (1651–1723, France, d/f)
- Allan Chapman (1946–2026, England, nf)
- Arthur Chapman (1873–1935, US, p/nf)
- George Chapman (c. 1559–1634, England, d/p)
- Guy Chapman (1889–1972, England, nf)
- James Chapman (born 1955, US, f)
- Pat Chapman (born 1940, England, nf)
- Hester Chapone (1827–1901, England, nf)
- Corinne Chaponnière (born 1954, Switzerland, nf)
- Maurice Chappaz (1916–2009, Switzerland, p/nf)
- Eric Chappell (1933–2022, England, d)
- Fred Chappell (1936–2024, US, p/f/nf)
- Eustace Chapuys (c. 1490/1492–1556, Savoy/Brabant, nf)
- René Char (1907–1988, France, p)
- Mehdi Charef (born 1952, France, d)
- Driss Ben Hamed Charhadi (1937–1986, Morocco, f), pseudonym of Larbi Layachi
- Charlotte Charke (1713–1760, England, d/f/nf)
- Irakli Charkviani (1961–2006, USSR/Georgia, p)
- Charles III (born 1948, England, ch)
- Charles, Duke of Orléans (1394–1465, France, p)
- Craig Charles (born 1964, England, f/p)
- David Charles (1762–1834, Wales, p)
- Elizabeth Charles (1828–1896, England, p/nf)
- Gerda Charles (1915–1996, England, f), pseudonym of Edna Lipson
- Thomas Charles (1755–1814, Wales, nf)
- Maria Louisa Charlesworth (1819–1880, England, ch/nf)
- James Charlton (born 1947, Australia, p/nf)
- Janet Charman (born 1954, N Zealand, p)
- Isabelle de Charrière (1740–1805, Netherlands/Prussia, nf/p), synonym Belle van Zuylen
- Leslie Charteris (1907–1993, England, f/d)
- Alain Chartier (c. 1385–1430, France, p/nf)
- James Hadley Chase (1906–1985, England/Switzerland, f)
- François-René de Chateaubriand (1768–1848, France, nf)
- Debjani Chatterjee (born 1952, India/England, p/nf)
- Georgiana Chatterton (1806–1876, England, nf)
- Thomas Chatterton (1752–1770, England, p/nf)
- Beth Chatto (1923–2018, England, nf)
- William Andrew Chatto (1799–1864, England, nf)
- Bruce Chatwin (1940–1989, England, nf/f)
- Leung Long Chau (梁朗秋, 1911–1998, China, p)
- Geoffrey Chaucer (c. 1343–1400, England, p/nf)
- Nirad C. Chaudhuri (1897–1999, India, nf/f)
- Subhadra Kumari Chauhan (1904–1948, India, p)
- Bernice Chauly (born 1968, Malaysia, nf/p)
- Nan Chauncy (1900–1970, England/Australia, ch)
- Christine Chaundler (1887–1972, England, ch), also as Peter Martin
- Alexander Chavchavadze (1786–1846, Russian E, p)
- Ilia Chavchavadze (1837–1907, Russian E, p/f/nf)
- Angelico Chavez (1910–1996, US, nf/p)
- Susana Chávez (1974–2011, Mexico, p)
- Daína Chaviano (born 1957, Cuba/US, f)
- Brenda Chawner (living, N Zealand, nf)
- Malcolm de Chazal (1902–1981, Mauritius, nf)
- Andrée Chedid (1920–2011, Egypt/France, p/f)
- Mavis Cheek (born 1948, England, f)
- John Cheever (1912–1982, US, f)
- John Cheke (1514–1557, England, nf)
- Anton Chekhov (1860–1904, Russia, d/f)
- Saveria Chemotti (born 1947, Italy, nf/f)
- Chen Danyan (陈丹燕, born 1958, China, nf/f)
- Chen Hongmou (陳宏謀, 1696–1771, China, nf)
- Chen Jingrong (陳敬容, 1917–1989, China, p)
- Chen Maiping (陳邁平, born 1952, China, nf/p)
- Chen Qiufan (陈楸帆, born 1981, China, f)
- Chen Ran (陈染, born 1962, China, f)
- Chen Shou (陳壽, 233–297, China, nf)
- Chen Xuezhao (陈学昭, 1906–1991, China, f/nf)
- Chen Zi'ang (陳子昂, 661 or 656–702, China, p)
- Charles-Julien Lioult de Chênedollé (1769–1833, France, p)
- Adolphe Chenevière (1855–1917, Switzerland/France, f/nf)
- Brainard Cheney (1900–1990, US, f/d/nf)
- Syl Cheney-Coker (born 1945, Sierra Leone, p/f/nf)
- Andrea Cheng (1957–2015, US, f/ch/p)
- Cheng Changwen (程長文, fl. 6th – 9th c. CE, China, p)
- François Cheng (程抱一, born 1929, China/France, p/f/nf)
- Cheng Yi (程頤, 1033–1107, China, nf)
- André Chénier (1762–1794, Ottoman E/France, p)
- Mohamed Cherak (born 1977, Algeria, nf)
- Victor Cherbuliez (1829–1899, Switzerland/France, f/nf)
- Paulette Cherici-Porello (1924–2018, Monaco, f/p)
- Voydan Chernodrinski (1875–1951, Ottoman E/Bulgaria, d)
- Ron Chernow (born 1949, US, nf)
- Nikolay Chernyshevsky (1828–1889, Russian E, nf/f)
- Kelly Cherry (born 1940, US, f/p/nf)
- C. J. Cherryh (born 1942, US, f)
- Ciarunji Chesaina (born 1947, Kenya, nf)
- Simon Cheshire (born 1954, England, ch)
- George Tomkyns Chesney (1830–1895, England, f)
- Marion Chesney (1936–2019, Scotland/England, f)
- Jacques Chessex (1934–2009, Switzerland, p/f)
- Denise Chesterton (1897–1985, England, f/d/nf), pseudonym of Denise Robins
- G. K. Chesterton (1874–1936, England, nf/f)
- Henry Chettle (c. 1564 – c. 1606, England, d/nf)
- Penelope Chetwode (1910–1986, England/India, nf)
- William Rufus Chetwood (died 1766, Ireland/England, d/f/nf)
- Angelica Cheung (born 1966, China/Hong Kong, nf), birth name Zhang Yu (张宇)
- Tracy Chevalier (born 1962, US/England, f)
- Corinne Chevallier (born 1935, Algeria, nf/f)
- Ruth Chew (1920–2010, US, ch)
- Peter Cheyney (1896–1951, England, f)
- Helmina von Chézy (1783–1856, Germany, p/d)
- Chi Li (池莉, born 1957, China, f)
- Chi Zijian (迟子建, born 1964, China, f)
- Grace Chia (born 1973, Singapore, p/f/nf)
- Gabriello Chiabrera (1552–1638, Italy, p)
- Ted Chiang (born 1967, US, f)
- Dan Chiasson (born 1971, US, p/nf)
- Marjorie Chibnall (1915–2012, England, nf)
- Catherine Chidgey (born 1970, N Zealand, f)
- Bernard Chidzero (1927–2002, S Rhodesia/Zimbabwe, f/nf)
- Chikamatsu Monzaemon (近松門左衛門, 1653–1725, Japan, d)
- Shadreck Chikoti (born 1979, Malawi, f/nf)
- Simon Chikovani (1902–1966, Russian E/USSR, p)
- Otar Chiladze (1933–2009, USSR/Georgia, f/p)
- Tamaz Chiladze (1931–2018, USSR/Georgia, f/d/p)
- Josiah Child (1630/1631–1699, England, nf)
- Lauren Child (born 1965, England, ch), born Helen Child
- Lee Child (born 1954, England, f)
- Lydia Maria Child (1802–1880, US, f/nf)
- Wilfred Rowland Childe (1890–1952, England, p/nf)
- Erskine Childers (1870–1922, England/Ireland, f/nf)
- William Chillingworth (1602–1644, England, nf)
- Edmund Chilmead (1610–1654, England, nf)
- Charles Chilton (1917–2013, England, nf)
- Irma Chilton (1930–1990, Wales, ch)
- Rocha Chimera (living, Kenya, nf/d)
- Steve Chimombo (1945–2015, Nyasaland/Malawi, p/d/f)
- Samuel Chimsoro (1949–2016, S Rhodesia/Zimbabwe, p/f)
- Marilyn Chin (陈美玲, born 1955, Hong Kong/US, p/nf)
- Chin Shunshin (陳舜臣, 1924–2015, Taiwan/Japan, f/nf)
- Shimmer Chinodya (born 1957, S Rhodesia/Zimbabwe, f)
- Chinweizu (born 1943, Nigeria, nf/p), pseudonym of Chinweizu Ibekwe
- Chionides (fl. 5th c. BCE, Greece, p)
- Edmund Chipamaunga (1938–2019, S Rhodesia/Zimbabwe, nf)
- Frank Chipasula (born 1949, Nyasaland/Malawi, p/nf)
- Yukie Chiri (知里幸恵, 1903–1922, Japan, f/nf)
- Constantin Chiriță (1925–1991, Romania, ch/f)
- Khin Myo Chit (1915–1999, Burma/Myanmar, f/nf)
- Herbert Chitepo (1923–1975, S Rhodesia/Zimbabwe, nf)
- Ch'oe Ch'i-wŏn (최치원, 857–10th c., Korea/China, nf/p)
- Fukuda Chiyo-ni (福田千代尼, 1703–1775, Japan, p)
- Paulina Chiziane (born 1955, Mozambique, f)
- Nagasubramanian Chokkanathan (born 1977, India, f/nf), pseudonym N. Chokkan
- Mary Cholmondeley (1859–1925, England, f)
- Noam Chomsky (born 1928, US, nf)
- Eileen Chong (born 1980, Singapore/Australia, p)
- Daniel Chonkadze (1830–1860, Russian E, f)
- Deepak Chopra (born 1946, India/US, nf)
- Henri Chopin (1922–2008, France, p)
- Kate Chopin (1850–1904, US, f)
- Charles Chorley (c. 1810–1874, England, nf)
- Mohamed Choukri (1935–2003, Morocco, f/nf)
- Wei-Liang Chow (周煒良, 1911–1995, China/US, nf)
- Satyabrata Rai Chowdhuri (1935–2016, India/UK, nf)
- Abdur Rouf Choudhury (1929–1996, India/Bangladesh, f/nf/p)
- Munier Choudhury (1925–1971, India/Bangladesh, d/nf)
- Mohamed Choukri (1935–2003, Morocco, nf/f)
- Asad Chowdhury (born 1943, India/Bangladesh, p/nf)
- Kabir Chowdhury (1923–2011, India/Bangladesh, nf)
- Driss Chraïbi (1926–2007, Morocco/France, f)
- Chrétien de Troyes (c. 1135 – c. 1185, France/Flanders, p)
- Helene Christaller (1872–1953, Germany, ch)
- Hjalmar Christensen (1869–1925, Norway, f/nf)
- Inger Christensen (1935–2009, Denmark, p/f/nf)
- Lars Saabye Christensen (born 1953, Norway, p/d/f)
- Jill Christian (1907–1985, England, f), pseudonym of Noreen Ford Dilcock
- Agatha Christie (1890–1976, England, f)
- Erling Christie (1928–1996, Norway, p/nf)
- Neil Christie (living, England, nf)
- Annie Christitch (1885–1977, Serbia/England, nf)
- Elizabeth Christitch (1861–1933, Ireland/England, nf/p)
- John Christopher (1922–2012, England, f), pseudonym of Samuel Youd
- Matt Christopher (1917–1997, US, ch)
- Solveig Christov (1918–1984, Norway, f/d)
- Stoyan Christowe (1898–1985, Ottoman E/US, f)
- Dobroslav Chrobák (1907–1951, Austria-Hungary/Czechoslovakia, f)
- Chrysippus (c. 279 – c. 206 BCE, Greece, nf)
- Chrystos (born 1946, US, nf/p), born Christina Smith
- Chu Anping (储安平, 1909 – c. 1966, China, nf)
- Chu Suiliang (褚遂良, 596–658, China, nf)
- Sadeq Chubak (1916–1998, Iran/US, f/d)
- Daria Chubata (born 1940, Ukraine, f/nf/p)
- Thomas Chubb (1679–1747, England, nf)
- Ralph Chubb (1892–1960, England, p)
- Mary Chudleigh (1656–1710, England, p/nf)
- Chudomir (1890–1967, Bulgaria, f), pseudonym of Dimitar Hristov Chorbadjiev
- Korney Chukovsky (1882–1969, Russian E/USSR, ch)
- Alí Chumacero (1918–2010, Mexico, p/nf)
- Alfred John Church (1829–1912, England, nf)
- Hubert Church (1857–1932, England/Australia, poet)
- James Church (living, US, f), unidentified pseudonym
- Richard Church (1893–1972, England, p)
- Richard William Church (1815–1890, England, nf)
- Caryl Churchill (born 1938, England, d)
- Charles Churchill (1732–1764, p/nf)
- Winston Churchill (1874–1965, England, nf)
- Winston Churchill (1871–1947, US, f)
- Sarah Churchwell (born 1970, US/England, f)
- Thomas Churchyard (c. 1523–1604, England, p)
- Kee Thuan Chye (born 1954, Malaya/Malaysia, nf/d)

== Ci–Cl ==
- John Ciardi (1916–1986, US, p/nf)
- Colley Cibber (1671–1757, England, d/p)
- Hanns Cibulka (1920–2004, Czechoslovakia/Germany, p/nf)
- Scott Ciencin (1962–2014, US, f/ch)
- Jozef Cíger-Hronský (1896–1960, Austria-Hungary/Czechoslovakia, f/d/ch)
- Cecile Cilliers (1933–2018, S Africa, nf/ch)
- Živko Čingo (1935–1987, Yugoslavia, f)
- Melko Čingrija (1873–1949, Austria-Hungary/Yugoslavia, nf)
- Ivo Ćipiko (1869–1923, Dalmatia/Yugoslavia, f)
- Emil Cioran (1911–1995, Austria-Hungary/Romania, nf)
- George Ciprian (1883–1968, Romania, d)
- Zoran Ćirić (born 1962, Yugoslavia/Serbia, f/p)
- Jovan Ćirilov (1931–2014, Yugoslavia/Serbia, nf/p)
- Dejan Ćirjaković (born 1979, Yugoslavia/Serbia, d)
- Dragan Ćirjanić (born 1954, Yugoslavia/Serbia, d/nf)
- Olivera Ćirković (born 1969, Yugoslavia/Greece, f)
- Antonio Cisneros (1942–2012, Peru, p/nf)
- Renato Cisneros (born 1976, Peru, p/f)
- Sandra Cisneros (born 1954, US/Mexico, f)
- Carson Cistulli (born 1979, US, p/nf)
- Robert Citino (born 1958, US, nf)
- Emil Cioran (1911–1995, Hungary/France, nf)
- Oscar Walter Cisek (1897–1966, Romania, f/p/nf)
- Hélène Cixous (born 1939, Algeria/France, p/d/nf)
- James Clackson (born 1966, England, nf)
- Sarah Clackson (1965–2003, England, nf)
- Ellen Clacy (1830–1901, England, nf), pseudonym Cycla
- Ernest Claes (1885–1968, Belgium, f)
- Stig Claesson (1928–2008, Sweden, nf)
- Andrée Clair (1916–1982, France/Niger, nf/ch), born Renée Jung
- Daphne Clair (born 1939, N Zealand, f)
- Margaret St. Clair (1911–1995, US, f)
- Amy Clampitt (1920–1994, US, p/nf)
- Kate Clanchy (born 1965, Scotland, p/d)
- Tom Clancy (1947–2013, US, f)
- John Clanvowe (c. 1341–1391, Wales, p)
- Michael Clapp (born 1932, England, nf)
- Fanny Clar (1875–1944, France, ch/d/f/p)
- Cassandra Clare (born 1973, US, f/cs)
- Horatio Clare (born 1973, England, f/nf/ch)
- John Clare (1793–1864, England, p)
- Monica Clare (1924–1973, Australia, f)
- Carol Higgins Clark (born 1956, US, f)
- Emily Clark (fl. 1798–1833, England, f/p)
- Elizabeth Clark (1918–1978, Scotland, p/d), pseudonym of Joan Ure
- George Kitson Clark (1900–1975, England, nf)
- Gillian Clarke (living, UK, nf)
- Grahame Clark (1907–1995, England, nf)
- J. P. Clark (1935–2020, Nigeria, p/d)
- Kate Clark (1847–1926, N Zealand, ch/p)
- Margaret Clark (born 1941, N Zealand, nf)
- Mary Higgins Clark (1927–2020, US, f)
- Mavis Thorpe Clark (1909–1999, Australia, f/ch)
- Miles Clark (1960–1993, N Ireland/England, nf)
- Ross Clark (born 1953, Australia, p)
- Thomas D. Clark (1903–2005, US, nf)
- Tom Clark (1941–2018, US, p/nf)
- William George Clark (1821–1878, England, nf)
- Amy Clarke (1892–1980, England, p/nf)
- Anna Clarke (1919–2004, S Africa/England, f)
- Arthur C. Clarke (1917–2008, England/Sri Lanka, f/nf)
- Austin Clarke (1896–1974, Ireland, p/d/f)
- Bob Clarke (born 1964, England, nf)
- Charles Cowden Clarke (1787–1877, England, nf)
- George Elliott Clarke (born 1960, Canada, p/d/nf)
- Gillian Clarke (born 1937, Wales, p/d)
- Mrs. Henry Clarke (1853–1908, England, f/ch)
- Henry Savile Clarke (1841–1893, England, d/nf)
- Jane Clarke (born 1950, England, nf)
- Jane E. Clarke (born 1954, England, ch/p)
- Jennie Thornley Clarke (1860–1924, US, nf)
- Lindsay Clarke (born 1939, England, f/p/d)
- Marcus Clarke (1846–1881, England/Australia, f/p/d)
- Mary Cowden Clarke (1809–1898, England, nf)
- Maxine Beneba Clarke (living, Australia, f/nf/p)
- Pauline Clarke (1921–2013, England, ch)
- Richard Clarke (died 1634, England, nf)
- Roy Clarke (born 1930, England, d)
- Samuel Clarke (1675–1729, England, nf)
- Susanna Clarke (born 1959, England, f)
- T. E. B. Clarke (1907–1989, England, d/f/nf)
- Victoria Clarke (living, England, nf)
- William Clarke (1696–1771, England, nf)
- Laurence Clarkson (1615–1667, England, nf)
- George Samuel Clason (1874–1957, US, nf)
- Francis Clater (1756–1823, England, nf)
- Paul Claudel (1868–1955, France, p/d)
- Claudian (c. 370 – c. 404 CE, Alexandria/Italy, p)
- Matthias Claudius (1740–1815, Germany, p/nf)
- Hugo Claus (1929–2008, Belgium, d/f/p)
- John Clavell (1601–1643, England, p/d)
- Jo Clayton (1939–1988, US, f)
- Meg Waite Clayton (born 1959, US, f)
- Beverly Cleary (1916–2021, US, ch)
- Brian P. Cleary (born 1959, US, ch/p)
- Jon Cleary (1917–2010, Australia, f/d)
- Chris Cleave (born 1973, England, f/nf)
- Paul Cleave (born 1974, N Zealand, f)
- Brian Cleeve (1921–2003, England/Ireland, f/nf)
- Lucas Cleeve (1862–1908, England, f), pseudonym of Adeline Georgiana Isabel Kingscote
- John Cleland (1709–1789, England, f)
- William Cleland (c. 1661–1689, Scotland, p)
- Justin Clemens (born 1969, Australia, nf/p/f)
- Samuel Clemens (1835–1910, US, f/nf), pseudonym Mark Twain
- Clement of Alexandria (c. 150–215 CE, Egypt, nf)
- Dick Clement (born 1937, England, d)
- Hal Clement (1922–2003, US, f), pseudonym of Harry Clement Stubbs
- Pope Clement I (died 99 CE, Roman E, nf)
- Vladimír Clementis (1902–1952, Austria-Hungary/Czechoslovakia, nf)
- Andrew Clements (1949–2019, US, ch)
- Jack Clemo (1916–1994, England, p/f/nf)
- Inga Clendinnen (1934–2016, Australia, nf)
- Maurice Clenock (c. 1525–1581, Wales, nf), also known as Morys Clynnog
- Cleobulina (fl. 6th c. BCE, Ancient Greece, p)
- Nicholas T. Clerk (1930–2012, Gold Coast/Ghana, nf)
- John Cleveland (1613–1658, England, p)
- Josse van Clichtove (1472/1473–1543, Flanders/France, nf)
- Michelle Cliff (1946–2016, Jamaica/US, f/p/nf)
- William Cliff (born 1940, Belgium, p), pseudonym of André Imberechts
- Lady Anne Clifford (1590–1676, England, nf)
- Lucy Clifford (1846–1929, England, f/d/ch)
- William Kingdon Clifford (1845–1879, England, nf)
- Charmian Clift (1923–1969, Australia, f/nf)
- Lucille Clifton (1936–2010, US, p/ch/f)
- Mark Clifton (1906–1963, US, f)
- Emma Cline (born c. 1989, US, f)
- Ernest Cline (born 1972, US, f/p)
- Bill Clinton (born 1946, US, nf)
- Henry Fynes Clinton (1781–1852, England, nf)
- Augustus Clissold (c. 1797–1882, England, nf)
- Caroline Clive (1801–1873, England, p/nf)
- John Clive (1933–2012, England, f)
- Kitty Clive (1711–1785, England, nf)
- Felicity Cloake (born 1980s, England, nf)
- Stuart Cloete (1897–1976, France/S Africa, f/nf)
- Amal Clooney (born 1978, Lebanon/England, nf), born Amal Alamuddin
- Arthur Hugh Clough (1819–1861, England, p/nf)
- Brenda Clough (born 1955, US, f)
- Bryan Clough (born 1932, England, nf)
- Hafina Clwyd (1936–2011, Wales, nf)
- Constance Clyde (1872–1951, N Zealand/Australia, nf), pseudonym of Constance Jane McAdam
- Eleanor Clymer (1906–2001, US, ch)
- Susan Clymer (born 1951, US, ch)

== Co ==
- Nellie Coad (1883–1974, N Zealand/England, nf)
- Wendy Coakley-Thompson (born 1966, US, f)
- Florence Van Leer Earle Coates (1850–1927, US, p)
- Grace Stone Coates (1881–1976, US, f/p/nf)
- Sheila Coates (1937–2000, England/Isle of Man, f)
- Richard Cobb (1917–1996, England, nf)
- Helena Cobban (born 1952, England/US, nf)
- William Cobbett (1763–1835, England, nf)
- Jojo Cobbinah (born 1948, Gold Coast/Ghana, nf)
- Bob Cobbing (1920–2002, England, p)
- Richard Cobbold (1797–1877, England, nf)
- Richard Cobden (1804–1865, England, nf)
- Harlan Coben (born 1962, US, f)
- Stanton A. Coblentz (1896–1982, US, f/nf/p)
- Mario Rodríguez Cobos (1938–2010, Argentina, f/nf), pseudonym Silo
- Robbie Coburn (born 1994, Australia, p)
- Sarah Johnson Cocke (1865–1944, US, f/nf)
- Ioan Mihai Cochinescu (born 1951, Romania, f/nf)
- Aston Cockayne (1608–1684, England, d/p)
- Alison Cockburn (1712–1794, Scotland, p/nf)
- Catharine Trotter Cockburn (1679–1749, England, f/d/nf)
- Claud Cockburn (1904–1981, China/Ireland, nf)
- Henry Cockburn, Lord Cockburn (1779–1954, Scotland, nf)
- Edward Cocker (1631–1676, England, nf)
- Charles Robert Cockerell (1788–1963, England, nf)
- Richard Cocks (1566–1624, England, nf)
- Henry Cockton (1807–1853, England, f)
- Jean Cocteau (1889–1963, France, p/d/f)
- Grace Coddington (born 1941, Wales/US, nf)
- Andrei Codrescu (born 1946, Romania/US, p/f/nf)
- Alice Rollit Coe (1858–1940, Canada/US, p)
- Jonathan Coe (born 1961, England, f/nf/ch)
- Allison Hedge Coke (born 1958, US, p/nf)
- Paulo Coelho (born 1947, Brazil, f/p)
- Sara Pinto Coelho (1913–1990, São Tomé and Príncipe, f/d/ch)
- Augusto Coello (1884–1941, Guatemala/Honduras, nf/p)
- J. M. Coetzee (born 1940, S Africa/Australia, f/nf)
- Judith Ortiz Cofer, (1952–2016, Puerto Rica, p/f/ch)
- Brian Coffey (1905–1995, Ireland, p)
- John Coffey (living, England, nf)
- Paolo Cognetti (born 1978, Italy, f/nf)
- Josh Cohen (born 1970, England, nf)
- Leonard Cohen, (1934–2016, Canada, p/f)
- Raphael H. Cohen (born 1953, Switzerland, nf)
- Shaughnessy Cohen (1948–1998, Canada, nf)
- Yolande Cohen (born 1950, Morocco/Canada, nf)
- Gabrielle de Coignard (c. 1550–1586, France, p)
- Allison Hedge Coke (born 1958, US, p/nf)
- Lady Mary Coke (1727–1811, England, nf)
- Rita Akoto Coker (born 1953, Ghana/US, f)
- Prokopije Čokorilo (1802–1866, Ottoman E, nf)
- Emily Colas (living, US, nf)
- Marie Colban (1814–1884, Norway, f/nf)
- Zerah Colburn (1832–1870, US, nf)
- Barry Cole (1936–2014, England, p)
- G. D. H. Cole (1889–1959, England, nf/f)
- Joanna Cole (1944–2020, US, ch)
- Margaret Cole (1893–1980, England, nf/f/p)
- Martina Cole (born 1959, England, f)
- Norma Cole (born 1945, Canada, p/nf)
- Olivia Cole (born 1981, England, p)
- Teju Cole (born 1975, Nigeria/US, f/nf)
- Hal Colebatch (1945–2019, Australia, p/nf)
- Aidan Coleman (born 1976, Wales/Australia, p/nf)
- Alice Blanchard Coleman (1858–1936, United States, nf)
- Wanda Coleman (1946–2013, US, p)
- Elizabeth Fairburn Colenso (1821–1904, N Zealand, nf)
- John Colenso (1814–1883, England, nf)
- Christabel Rose Coleridge (1843–1921, England, f/nf)
- Derwent Coleridge (1800–1883, England, nf)
- Ernest Hartley Coleridge (1846–1920, England, nf/p)
- Hartley Coleridge (1796–1849, England, p/nf)
- Mary Elizabeth Coleridge (1861–1907, England, f/nf/p)
- Samuel Taylor Coleridge (1772–1834, England, p/nf)
- Sara Coleridge (1802–1852, England, nf/ch)
- Stephen Coleridge (1854–1936, England, nf)
- Robert Coles (1928–2026, US, nf)
- Louise Colet (1810–1876, France, p/nf)
- Colette (1873–1954, France, f/nf)
- Edward Coletti, (born 1944, Italy/US, p)
- Chris Colfer (born 1990, US, d/ch)
- Eoin Colfer (born 1965, Ireland, ch)
- Sneed B. Collard III (born 1959, US, nf/ch)
- Lindsey Collen (born 1948, S Africa/Mauritius, f)
- Camilla Collett (1813–1895, Norway, f/nf)
- Jane Collier (1714–1755, England, f)
- Jeremy Collier (1650–1726, England, nf)
- John Collier (1708–1786, England, p)
- John Collier (1901–1980, England, f/d/nf)
- John Payne Collier (1789–1883, England, nf)
- Mary Collier (c. 1688–1762, England, p)
- Heinrich Joseph von Collin (1771–1811, Austrian E, d/p)
- Matthäus Casimir von Collin (1779–1824, Austrian E, p/d)
- R. G. Collingwood (1889–1943, England, nf)
- W. G. Collingwood (1854–1932, England, nf)
- An Collins (fl. 1653, England, p)
- Anthony Collins (1676–1729, England, nf)
- Billy Collins (born 1941, US, p)
- Charles James Collins (1820–1864, England, f/nf)
- Jackie Collins (1937–2015, England/US, f)
- Joan Collins (born 1933, England, f/nf)
- John Collins (1625–1683, England, nf)
- John Collins (1742–1808, England, p)
- John Churton Collins (1848–1908, England, nf)
- Larry Collins (1929–2005, US, f/nf)
- Max Allan Collins (born 1948, US, f)
- Merle Collins (born 1950, Aruba/Grenada, p/f)
- Suzanne Collins (born 1962, US, nf)
- Michael Collins (1924–2005, US, f), pseudonym of Dennis Lynds
- Mortimer Collins (1827–1876, England, p/f)
- Norman Collins (1907–1982, England, nf)
- Warwick Collins (1948–2013, England, f/nf)
- Suzanne Collins (born 1962, US, d/f/nf)
- Wilkie Collins (1824–1889, England, f)
- William Collins (1721–1759, England, p)
- Laurence Collinson (1925–1986, England/Australia, d/p/nf)
- John Stewart Collis (1900–1984, Ireland, nf)
- Maurice Collis (1889–1973, Ireland, nf)
- Danielle Collobert (1940–1978, France, nf/p)
- Carlo Collodi (1826–1890, Italy, f/nf)
- Mary Collyer (c. 1716–1763, England, nf/f)
- George Colman the Elder (1732–1794, England, d/nf)
- George Colman the Younger (1762–1836, England, d/nf)
- Francisco Coloane (1910–2002, Chile, f)
- Vittoria Colonna (1492–1547, Italy, p)
- Glenn Colquhoun (born 1964, N Zealand, p)
- Padraic Colum (1881–1972, Ireland, p/f/d)
- Jock Colville (1915–1987, England, nf)
- Howard Colvin (1919–2007, England, nf)
- George Combe (1788–1858, Scotland, nf)
- William Combe (1742–1823, England, p/nf)
- John Amos Comenius (1592–1670, Bohemia/Netherlands, nf), in Czech Jan Amos Komenský
- Alex Comfort (1920–2000, England, nf)
- Anna Manning Comfort (1845–1931, US, f/nf)
- Anna Olcott Commelin (1841–1924, US, p/f/nf)
- Jack Common (1903–1968, England, nf/f)
- Ying Chang Compestine (張瀛, born 1963, China/US, nf/f)
- Anne Compton (born 1947, Canada, p/nf)
- Jennifer Compton (born 1949, N Zealand/Australia, p/d)
- Jennifer Compton (born 1949, N Zealand, p/d)
- Ivy Compton-Burnett (1884–1969, England, f)
- Harriet Theresa Comstock (1860–1925, US, f/ch)
- Auguste Comte (1798–1857, France, nf)
- Barbara Comyns (1907–1992, England, f)
- Maryse Condé (1937–2024, Guadeloupe, f/nf/d)
- Marquis de Condorcet (1743–1794, France, nf)
- Helen Gray Cone (1859–1934, US, p/f/nf)
- Sandra Coney (born 1944, N Zealand, nf)
- Raphaël Confiant (born 1951, Martinique, f/nf)
- William Congreve (1670–1729, England, d/p)
- Thomas Coningsby (1550–1625, England, nf)
- Groff Conklin (1904–1968, US, nf)
- Jane Leslie Conly (born 1948, US, f/ch)
- Stewart Conn (born 1936, Scotland, p/d)
- Paul Conneally, (born 1959, England, p)
- Jim Connell (1852–1929, Ireland/England, p)
- Charlie Connelly (born 1970, England, nf)
- Cyril Connolly (1903–1974, England, nf)
- Joseph Connolly (born 1950, f/nf)
- Sally Connolly (born 1976, England/US, nf)
- William E. Connolly (1938–2026, US, nf)
- Tony Connor (born 1930, England, p/d)
- Conon de Béthune (born pre-1160, France, p)
- Benoît Conort (born 1956, France, p/nf)
- Robert Conquest (1917–2015, England/US, nf/p)
- Joseph Conrad (1857–1924, Poland/UK, f/nf)
- Lauren Conrad (born 1986, US, f/nf)
- Hendrik Conscience (1812–1883, French E/Belgium, f)
- Consort Ban (班婕妤, c. 48–2 BCE), China, p/nf), in Chinese Pan Chieh-yü
- Henry Constable (1562–1613, England/Low Countries, p)
- Benjamin Constant (1767–1830, Switzerland/France, nf)
- Constantine of Kostenets (c. 1380 – post-1431, Bulgaria/Serbia, nf)
- Constantine of Preslav (fl. 9th–10th c., Moravia/Bulgaria, nf)
- David Constantine (born 1944, England, p/f)
- Susannah Constantine (born 1962, England, nf)
- Haroldo Conti (1925 – c. 1976, Argentina, f)
- William Farquhar Conton (1925–2003, Gambia/Sierra Leone, nf/f)
- Hilma Contreras (1913–2006, Dominican Rep., f)
- Damian Conway (born 1964, Australia, nf)
- Elsie Conway (1902–1992, England, nf)
- Hugh Conway (1847–1885, England/France, f), pseudonym of Frederick John Fargus
- Robert Seymour Conway (1864–1933, England, nf)
- Catherine Conybeare (born 1966, England/US, nf)
- John Conybeare (1692–1755, England, nf)
- John Josias Conybeare (1779–1824, England, nf)
- William Conybeare (1787–1857, England, nf)
- William Conybeare (1815–1857, England, nf/f)
- David Cook (1940–2015, England, d/f)
- Edward Dutton Cook (1829–1883, England, nf/d/f)
- Eliza Cook (1818–1889, England, nf)
- Glen Cook (born 1944, US, f)
- Hugh Cook (1956–2008, N Zealand, f)
- James Cook (1728–1779, England, nf)
- Judith Cook (1933–2004, England, nf/f)
- Pam Cook (born 1943, England, nf)
- Robin Cook (1946–2005, Scotland/England, nf)
- Elizabeth Cook-Lynn (1930–2023, US, nf/p/f)
- Dorian Cooke (1916–2005, England, p)
- James Francis Cooke (1875–1960, US, nf)
- Kay McKenzie Cooke (born 1953, N Zealand, p)
- Mordecai Cubitt Cooke (1825–1914, England, nf)
- Thomas Cooke (1703–1756, England, nf)
- Catherine Cookson (1906–1998, England, f)
- William Cookson (1939–2003, England, p/nf)
- Ina Coolbrith (1841–1928, US, p/nf)
- Antoon Coolen (1897–1961, Netherlands, f)
- Clark Coolidge (born 1939, US, p/nf)
- Susan Coolidge (1835–1905, US, ch), pseudonym of Sarah Chauncey Woolsey
- William Henry Coombes (1767–1850, England, nf)
- Barbara Cooney (1917–2000, US, ch)
- Caroline B. Cooney (born 1947, US, f)
- Artemis Cooper (born 1953, England, nf)
- Carolyn Cooper (born 1950, Jamaica, nf)
- Dennis Cooper (born 1953, US, f/nf/p)
- Duff Cooper (1890–1954, England, nf)
- Glenn Cooper (born 1953, US, f)
- Helen Cooper (born 1947, England, nf)
- James Fenimore Cooper (1789–1851, US, f)
- Jilly Cooper (born 1937, England, nf/f)
- Lettice Cooper (1897–1994, England, f/nf)
- Susan Cooper (born 1935, England, f/nf/d)
- Thomas Cooper (1805–1892, England, p/f/nf)
- William Cooper (1910–2002, England, f), pseudonym of H. S. Hof
- Isabel Cooper-Oakley (1854–1914, England, nf)
- Robert Coover (1932–2024, US, f/nf/d)
- Edward Meredith Cope (1818–1873, England, nf)
- Wendy Cope (born 1945, England, p/ch)
- Lori Copeland (living, US, nf)
- Lorraine Copeland (1921–2013, Scotland/France, nf)
- Copi (1939–1987, Argentina/France, f/d), pseudonym of Raúl Damonte Botana
- Branko Ćopić (1915–1984, Yugoslavia, ch/f)
- Robert Copland (fl. 1508–1547, England, p/nf)
- Frederick Copleston (1907–1994, England, nf)
- Esther Copley (1786–1851, England, nf/ch)
- A. E. Coppard (1878–1957, England, p/f)
- Abiezer Coppe (1619–1672, England, nf)
- François Coppée (1842–1908, France, p/f)
- Marguerite Coppin (1867–1931, Belgium, f/p/nf)
- Sue Copsey (born 1960, N Zealand, ch)
- Julia Copus (born 1969, England, nf/p/ch)
- Cora Coralina (1889–1985, Brazil, p/ch), pseudonym of Anna Lins dos Guimarães Peixoto Bretas
- Judy Corbalis (living, N Zealand, f)
- Denys Corbet (1826–1909, Guernsey, p)
- Richard Corbet (1582–1635, England, nf/p)
- Jim Corbett (1875–1955, England, nf)
- Julian Corbett (1854–1922, England, nf)
- Susannah Corbett (born 1968, England, ch)
- Tristan Corbière (1845–1875, France, p)
- Michael Cordy (living, Ghana/England, f)
- Marie Corelli (1855–1924, England, f), pseudonym of Mary Mackay
- Alan Coren (1938–2007, England, nf)
- Giles Coren (born 1969, England, nf/f)
- Deborah Joy Corey (born 1958, Canada, f/nf)
- Peter Corey (1946—2019, England, ch)
- Corinna (unknown late BCE dates, Ancient Greece, p)
- Hilary Corke (1921–2001, England, p)
- William Corlett (1938–2005, England, ch)
- Cid Corman (1924–2004, US, p)
- Robert Cormier (1925–2000, US, f/ch)
- Alfred Corn (born 1943, US, p/nf)
- Pierre Corneille (1606–1684, France, d)
- Thomas Corneille (1625–1709, France, nf/d)
- Adam Cornford (born 1950, England/US, p/nf)
- F. M. Cornford (1874–1943, England, nf)
- Frances Cornford (1886–1960, England, p)
- John Cornford (1915–1936, England, p)
- Cornificia (c. 85 – 40 BCE, Ancient Greece, p/nf)
- Caroline Cornwallis (1786–1858, England, nf)
- Jane Cornwallis (1581–1659, England, nf)
- Bernard Cornwell (born 1944, England, f)
- Patricia Cornwell (born 1956, US, f)
- William Cornysh (1465–1523, England, d/p)
- Jorge Icaza Coronel (1906–1978, Ecuador, d/f)
- Svetozar Ćorović (1875–1919, Ottoman E/Yugoslavia, f)
- Maggy Corrêa (living, Rwanda/Switzerland, nf/f)
- Hélia Correia (born 1949, Portugal, f/d/p)
- Gaspar Correia (1492 – c. 1553, Portugal/Goa, nf)
- Natália Correia (1923–1993, Portugal, p/nf)
- Joe Corrie (1894–1968, Scotland, p/d)
- Felicitas Corrigan (1908–2003, England, nf)
- Gregory Corso (1930–2001, US, p)
- Hugo Brandt Corstius (1935–2014, Netherlands, f/nf)
- Julio Cortázar (1914–1984, Argentina/France, f/nf)
- Alfonso Cortés (1893–1969, Nicaragua, p)
- Jayne Cortez (1934–2012, US, p)
- Annie Sophie Cory (1868–1952, England, f)
- William Johnson Cory (1823–1892, England, p)
- Thomas Coryat (c. 1577–1617, England, nf)
- George Coșbuc (1866–1918, Romania, p/nf)
- Bora Ćosić (born 1932, Yugoslavia/Germany, f/nf)
- Branimir Ćosić (1903–1934, Serbia/Yugoslavia, f)
- Dobrica Ćosić (1921–2014, Yugoslavia/Serbia, nf)
- John Cosin (1594–1672, England, nf)
- Cosmas the Priest (fl. c. 10th c., Bulgaria, nf)
- Roberto Cossa (1934–2024, Argentina, d)
- Albert Cossery (1913–2008, Egypt/France, f)
- Alicia Yánez Cossío (born 1928, Ecuador, p/f/nf)
- Cláudio Manuel da Costa (1729–1789, Brazil, p), pseudonym Glauceste Satúrnio
- Maria Velho da Costa (1938–2020, Portugal, f/nf)
- Orlando da Costa (1929–2006, Portugal, nf)
- Luis Alberto Costales (1926–2006, Ecuador, p/nf)
- Dudley Costello (1803–1865, Ireland/England, f/nf)
- Louisa Stuart Costello (1799–1870, England, nf)
- Charles De Coster (1827–1879, Germany/Belgium, f)
- Miron Costin (1633–1691, Moldavia, nf/p)
- Randle Cotgrave (died 1652, England, nf)
- Charles Cotin (1604–1681, France, nf/p)
- Côtis-Capel (1915–1986, France, p), pseudonym of Albert Lohier
- Aleksandar Čotrić (born 1966, Yugoslavia/Serbia, nf)
- Joseph Seamon Cotter, Sr. (1861–1949, US, p/d/nf)
- Charles Cotterell (1615–1701, England, nf)
- Joseph Cottle (1770–1853, England, p/nf)
- Charles Cotton (1630–1687, England, p/nf)
- John Cotton (1585-1652, England, nf)
- Robert Cotton, (1570/1571–1631, England, nf)
- Dorothy Cottrell (1902–1957, Australia, f)
- Violet May Cottrell (1887–1971, N Zealand, f/p)
- Frank Cottrell-Boyce (born 1959, England, cs/d)
- Anna Couani (born 1948, Australia, f/nf/p)
- Florent Couao-Zotti (born 1964, Benin, d/f)
- Félix Couchoro (1900–1968, Benin/Togo, f)
- Oswald Couldrey (1882–1958, England, p/nf)
- Micheline Coulibaly (1950–2003, Ivory Coast/Dubai, f/ch)
- Catherine Coulter (born 1942, US, f)
- Stephen Coulter (1914 – unknown date of death, England, f)
- G. G. Coulton (1858–1947, England, nf)
- Emily Coungeau (1860–1936, England/Australia, p)
- Heather Couper (1949–2020, England, nf)
- Louis Couperus (1863–1923, Netherlands, f/p)
- Douglas Coupland (born 1961, Canada, f/nf)
- James Courage (1903–1963, N Zealand, f/p)
- Dilly Court (born 1940, England, f)
- Georges Courteline (1858–1929, France, d/f)
- Bryce Courtenay (1933–2012, S Africa/Australia, f)
- William John Courthope (1842–1917, England, nf)
- Hedwig Courths-Mahler (1867–1950, Germany, f)
- Caroline Courtney (1946–2011, England, f), pseudonym of Penelope Jones Halsall
- Janet E. Courtney (1865–1954, England, nf)
- Polly Courtney (born 1979, England, f/nf)
- Henry Cousens (1853–1933, Scotland, nf)
- Gaston Couté (1880–1911, France, p/nf)
- Diogo do Couto (c. 1542–1616, Portugal, nf)
- Mia Couto (born 1955, Mozambique, p/f/ch)
- Dani Couture (born 1978, Canada, p/f)
- Adolfo Couve (1940–1996, Chile, nf)
- Jessie Catherine Couvreur (1848–1897, England/Australia, f), pseudonym Tasma
- David Coventry (born 1969, N Zealand, f)
- Francis Coventry (1725–1759, England, p/f)
- Myles Coverdale (1488–1569, England, nf)
- Watriquet de Couvin (fl. 1319–1329, France, p)
- Bruce Coville (born 1950, US, ch)
- Noël Coward (1899–1973, England, d/nf)
- Winston Cowie (born 1982, N Zealand, f/nf)
- Abraham Cowley (1616–1667, England, p/d)
- Hannah Cowley (1743–1809, England, d/p)
- Joy Cowley (born 1936, N Zealand, ch)
- Malcolm Cowley (1898–1989, US, nf/p)
- Dorothy Cowlin (1911–2010, England, f/p/nf)
- E. E. Cowper (1859–1933, England, ch)
- Frank Cowper (1849–1930, England, ch/f/nf)
- William Cowper (1731–1800, England, p/nf)
- Josephine Cox (1938–2020, England, f)
- Stephen R. Covey (1932–2012, US, nf)
- Sean Covey (born 1964, US, nf)
- Frances Cowen (1915–1992, England, f/ch)
- William Cowper (1731–1800, England, p)
- Anthony Berkeley Cox (1893–1971, England, f)
- Palmer Cox (1840–1924, Canada, ch)
- William Coxe (1748–1828, England, nf)
- Edward Coxere (1633–1694, England, nf)
- John Coy (born 1958, US, ch)
- Peter Coyote (born 1941, US, nf)

== Cr–Cs ==
- George Crabbe (1754–1832, England, p)
- Jim Crace (born 1946, England, f)
- Hubert Crackanthorpe (1870–1896, England, nf/f)
- Fanny Cradock (1909–1994, England, nf)
- Nicholas Crafts (born 1949, England, nf)
- Sara Jane Crafts (1845–1930, US, nf)
- Albert Craig (1849–1909, England, p)
- Amanda Craig (born 1959, S Africa/England, f/nf)
- Barbara Craig (1915–2005, India/England, nf)
- Joe Craig (born 1981, England, ch)
- Dinah Craik (1826–1887, England, f/p), born Dinah Maria Mulock
- Helen Craik (c. 1751–1825, Scotland/England, p/f)
- Robert Crais (born 1953, US, f)
- Hart Crane (1899–1932, US, p)
- Stephen Crane (1871–1900, US, p/f)
- Edward Crankshaw (1909–1984, England, nf)
- Richard Crashaw (c. 1613–1649, England/Italy, p)
- Gheorghe Crăciun (1950–2007, Romania, f)
- Sibylla Bailey Crane (1851–1902, US, nf)
- José Craveirinha (1922–2003, Mozambique, f/nf/p)
- Elizabeth Craven (1750–1828, England, nf), born Lady Elizabeth Berkeley
- Rachael Craw (living, N Zealand, f)
- Francis Marion Crawford (1854–1909, US/Italy, f/nf/d)
- Isabella Valancy Crawford (1846–1887, Ireland/Canada, p)
- Max Crawford (1938–2010, US, f)
- O. G. S. Crawford (1886–1957, India/England, nf)
- Robert Crawford (1868–1930, Australia, p)
- Helen Crawfurd (1877–1954, Scotland, nf)
- Ion Creangă (1837–1889, Moldavia/Romania, f/nf/ch)
- John Creasey (1908–1973, England, f)
- Edward Shepherd Creasy (1812–1878, England, nf)
- Claude Prosper Jolyot de Crébillon (1707–1777, France, f)
- Sharon Creech (born 1945, US, ch)
- Thomas Creech (1659–1700, England, nf)
- Robert Creeley (1926–2005, US, p)
- Thomas Creevey (1768–1838, England, nf)
- Jane Tapsubei Creider (born 1940s, Kenya/Canada, f/nf)
- Mandell Creighton (1843–1901, England, nf)
- Octave Crémazie (1827–1879, Canada/France, p)
- Dave Crenshaw (born 1975, US, nf)
- Jean-Paul Crespelle (1910–1994, France, nf)
- Caroline de Crespigny (1797–1861, England, p)
- Luis Cordero Crespo (1833–1912, Ecuador, p)
- Douglas Cresswell (1894–1960, N Zealand, nf)
- Helen Cresswell (1934–2005, England, ch)
- Jasmine Cresswell (born 1941, Wales/US, f)
- K. A. C. Creswell (1879–1974, England, nf)
- Helen Cresswell (1934–2005, England, d/ch)
- Nicholas Cresswell (1750–1804, England, nf)
- Walter D'Arcy Cresswell (1896–1960, N Zealand, p/nf)
- Julia Pleasants Creswell (1827–1886, US, p/f)
- René Crevel (1900–1935, France, f)
- Isaac Crewdson (1780–1844, England, nf)
- Michael Crichton (1942–2008, US, f)
- Bernard Crick (1929–2008, England, nf)
- Michael Crick (born 1958, England, nf)
- Martin Crimp (born 1956, England, d)
- Arthur Shearly Cripps (1869–1952, England/S Rhodesia, nf/f/p)
- Louise Crisp (born 1957, Australia, p)
- Quentin Crisp (1908–1999, England, nf)
- Samuel Crisp (1707–1783, England, d)
- Alice Guerin Crist (1876–1941, Ireland/Australia, p/f)
- Ann Batten Cristall (1769–1848, England, p)
- Millie Criswell (born 1948, US, f)
- Branislav Crnčević (1933–2011, Yugoslavia/Serbia, f/p/ch)
- Miloš Crnjanski (1893–1977, Austria-Hungary/Serbia, p/f/nf)
- Herbert Croft (1603–1691, England, nf)
- Herbert Croft (1751–1816, England, f/nf)
- Julian Croft (born 1941, Australia, p/nf)
- Rupert Croft-Cooke (1903–1979, England, f/nf)
- Andrew Crofts (born 1953, England, nf)
- Alison Croggon (born 1962), S Africa/Australia, p/d/f)
- Bithia Mary Croker (1848 or 1849–1920, Ireland, f)
- Marianne Croker (1791–1854, England, nf)
- Thomas Crofton Croker (1798–1854, Ireland, nf)
- Thomas Francis Dillon Croker (1831–2012, England, p/nf)
- Richmal Crompton (1890–1969, England, ch)
- Rosemary Crompton (1942–2011, England, nf)
- A. J. Cronin (1896–1981, Scotland/Switzerland, f)
- Jeremy Cronin (born 1949, S Africa, p/nf)Patrick Cullinan
- Michael Cronin (born 1942, England, ch/d)
- M. T. C. Cronin (born 1963, Australia, p)
- Vincent Cronin (1924–2011, England, nf)
- Compton N. Crook (1908–1981, US, f), pseudonym, Stephen Tall
- Judy Croome (born 1958, S Africa, f/p)
- Wolf-Ulrich Cropp (born 1941, Germany, nf/f)
- Charles Cros (1842–1888, France, p/nf)
- Camilla Dufour Crosland (1812–1895, England, f/p/nf)
- A. F. Cross (1863–1940, England, p/d/nf)
- Elsa Cross (born 1946, Mexico, p/nf)
- Gillian Cross (born 1945, England, ch)
- Zora Cross (1890–1964, Australia, p/f)
- Sarah Crossan (living, Ireland, ch)
- Kevin Crossley-Holland (born 1941, England, ch/p)
- Blake Crouch (born 1978, US, f)
- Jean-Pierre de Crousaz (1663–1750, Switzerland, nf)
- Catherine Crowe (1803–1876, England, f/d/ch)
- William Crowe, 1745–1879, England, p/nf)
- Aleister Crowley (1875–1947, England, p/f)
- Robert Crowley (c. 1517–1588, England/Germany, p/nf)
- John Crowne (1641–1712, England, d)
- Samuel Ajayi Crowther (c. 1809–1891, Sierra Leone/Nigeria, nf)
- Andrew Crozier (1943–2008, England, p)
- Alexander Cruden (1699–1770, Scotland, nf)
- Helen Cruickshank (1886–1975, Scotland, p)
- Andrew Crumey (born 1961, Scotland, f/nf)
- Barry Crump (1935–1996, N Zealand, f)
- Paul J. Crutzen (1933–2021, Netherlands, nf)
- Arturo Cruz Jr. (born 1953, Nicaragua, nf)
- Juana Inés de la Cruz (1648–1695, Mexico, nf/p)
- Tomaz Vieira da Cruz (born 1960, Portugal, p)
- Viriato da Cruz (1928–1973, Angola/China, p)
- György Csanády (1895–1952, Hungary, p/nf)
- Géza Csáth (1887–1919, Hungary, f/nf/d), pseudonym of József Brenner
- Gergely Csiky (1842–1891, Hungary, d)
- Gabriella Csire (born 1938, Romania, ch)
- Mihály Csokonai (1783–1805, Austria-Hungary, p/d), full name Mihály Csokonai Vitéz
- Sándor Csoóri (1930–2016, Hungary, nf/p)

== Cu–Cz ==
- José de la Cuadra (1903–1941, Ecuador, f)
- Pablo Antonio Cuadra (1912–2002, Nicaragua, nf/p)
- J. A. Cuddon (1928–1996, England, nf)
- Annie Hall Cudlip (1838–1918, England, f)
- Pender Hodge Cudlip (1835–1911, England, nf)
- Alonso Cueto (born 1954, Peru, f/nf)
- Tone Čufar (1905–1942, Austrian E/Yugoslavia, f/p/d), Holocaust victim
- Ottobah Cugoano (c. 1757 – post-1791, Gold Coast/England, nf)
- Cui Hao (崔顥, c. 704 – c. 754, China, p)
- Anne Virginia Culbertson (1857–1918, US, f/nf/p)
- Belle Caldwell Culbertson (1857–1934, US, nf)
- Ioan Petru Culianu (1950–1991, Romania/US, nf/f)
- Gordana Ćulibrk (born 1952, Yugoslavia/Serbia, f/p)
- Nicholas J. Cull (born 1964, US, nf)
- Countee Cullen (1903–1946, US, p/f/ch)
- Jonathan Culler (born 1944, US/England, nf)
- Patrick Cullinan (1932–2011, S Africa, p/nf)
- Majella Cullinane (living, N Zealand, p/f)
- John Cullum (1733–1785, England, nf)
- Ridgwell Cullum (1867–1943, England, f)
- Chris Culver (living, US, f)
- Nathaniel Culverwell (1619–1651, England, nf)
- Necati Cumalı (1921–2001, Turkey, f/nf/p)
- Richard Cumberland (1631/1632–1718, England, nf)
- Richard Cumberland (1731/1732–1811, England, d/f)
- E. E. Cummings (1894–1962, US, p/nf/d)
- Nancy Cunard (1896–1965, England, p/nf)
- Joseph Cundall (1818–1895, England, ch)
- Anne Cuneo (1936–2015, France/Switzerland, f/d)
- Euclides da Cunha (1866–1909, Brazil, nf)
- Álvaro Cunhal (1913–2005, Portugal, nf)
- John Cunliffe (1933–2018, ch)
- Allan Cunningham (1784–1842, Scotland, p/f/nf)
- Daniel John Cunningham (1850–1909, Scotland, nf)
- J. V. Cunningham (1911–1985, US, p/nf)
- Timothy Cunningham (died 1789, England, nf)
- Maud Cunnington (1869–1951, Wales/England, nf/ch)
- Will Cuppy (1884–1949, US, nf)
- Suzanne Curchod (1737–1794, Switzerland, nf)
- Milan Ćurčin (1880–1960, Austria-Hungary/Yugoslavia, p/nf)
- Jean Curlewis (1898–1930, Australia, f/nf)
- Allen Curnow (1911–2001, N Zealand, p/nf)
- Roland Curram (born 1932, England, f)
- Margaret Curran (1887–1962, Australia, p/nf)
- R. N. Currey (1907–2001, S Africa/England, p)
- Katy Currie (born 1946, US, f), pseudonym of Susan Spaeth Kyle
- Jane Louise Curry (born 1932, US, ch/f)
- Christopher Paul Curtis (born 1953, US, ch)
- Lionel Curtis (1872–1955, England, nf)
- William Curtis (1746–1799, England, nf)
- Alice Curwen (c. 1619–1679, England, nf)
- James Oliver Curwood (1878–1927, US, f/nf)
- Dymphna Cusack (1902–1981, Australia, d/f/nf)
- Karen Cushman (born 1941, US, f)
- Clive Cussler (1931–2020, US, f)
- Harry Cust (1861–1917, England, p/nf)
- Nannie Webb Curtis (1861–1920, US, nf)
- Catherine Cuthbertson (c. 1775–1842, England, f)
- James Cuthbertson (1851–1910, Scotland/Australia, p)
- Ivor Cutler (1923–2006, Scotland/England, p/nf)
- Judith Cutler (born 1946, England, f)
- John Cutts (1661–1707, England, nf)
- Umihana Čuvidina (c. 1794 – c. 1870, Ottoman E, p)
- Agustín Cuzzani (1824–1887, Argentina, d)
- Lidija Cvetkovic (born 1967, Yugoslavia/Australia, p)
- Józef Czechowicz (1903–1939, Poland, p/d)
- Renato Cirell Czerna (1922–2005, Brazil, nf)
- Alfons von Czibulka (1888–1969, Austrian E/Germany, f/nf)
- Gergely Czuczor (1800–1866, Austrian E/Hungary, p)
- Emil Czyrniański (1824–1888, Poland, nf)
- Tytus Czyżewski (1880–1945, Poland, nf/p/d)
