= Clissold Park =

Open space in London, England

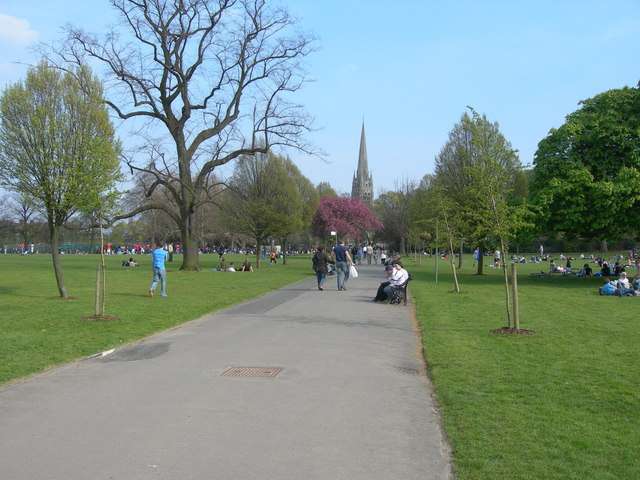
- Interactive map of Clissold Park
- Location: Stoke Newington, London, England, United Kingdom
- Coordinates: 51°33′40″N 0°5′17″W
- Area: 22.57 hectares (55.8 acres)
- Created: 1889
- Operator: London Borough of Hackney

Clissold Park is an open space in Stoke Newington, in the London Borough of Hackney. It is bounded by Greenway Close (to the north), Church Street (south), Green Lanes (west) and Queen Elizabeth's Walk (east); the south-east corner abuts St Mary's Old Church, now an arts venue. The park is 22.57 hectares (55.8 acres) in extent. The main building within its boundaries is the Grade II listed Clissold House, run as a cafe and events venue.

The park's facilities include children's playgrounds, sports fields, a bowling green, a skatepark bowl, tennis courts, and a paddling pool. Other attractions include an aviary with assorted captive species, an enclosure of deer and goats, a butterfly dome, and two small lakes hosting wild ducks, geese, swans and other water birds. The park also comprises a short section of the New River, and the Capital Ring has some of its paths running through the park.

Clissold Park received a Green Flag award in July 2008, and was substantially restored soon afterwards.

== History ==
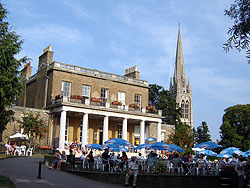
A café is housed in the late-18th century mansion; the spire of St Mary's Church, Stoke Newington can be seen in the background

Clissold House (formerly Paradise House) was built, in the latter half of the 18th century, for Jonathan Hoare, a City of London merchant, Quaker, philanthropist and anti-slavery campaigner. (His brother, Samuel, half-brother of Sir Joseph Hoare Bt, was one of the founders of the Society for Effecting the Abolition of the Slave Trade.) The park was created to be his idyll, and the stretch of water which wends its way around the house was part of the New River, an artificial waterway that supplied the capital with clean water from Hertfordshire.

Hoare, in financial difficulties, mortgaged the estate, and then lost it by foreclosure to a Robert Pryor. It was sold by Pryor's executors to Thomas Gudgeon, a merchant, who owned it around the beginning of the 19th century. Gudgeon sold it in 1811 to William Crawshay I.

Clissold Park (Stoke Newington) Act 1887
- Act of Parliament
- Parliament of the United Kingdom
- Long title: An Act to authorise the acquisition of Clissold Park, Stoke Newington, and its utilisation for public purposes.
- Citation: 50 & 51 Vict. c. cxxxvii

Dates
- Royal assent: 19 July 1887
Other legislation
Repealed by	London County Council (General Powers) Act 1908

Status: Repealed

Text of statute as originally enacted

Subsequently, the estate passed, through a Crawshay family connection, to Augustus Clissold. When he died in 1882 the Ecclesiastical Commissioners bought the property, intending to profit from development. However, John Runtz and Joseph Beck persuaded the Metropolitan Board of Works to purchase it in 1887, to open it as a public park. The two lakes were named Beckmere and Runtzmere in their honour.

== Restoration ==
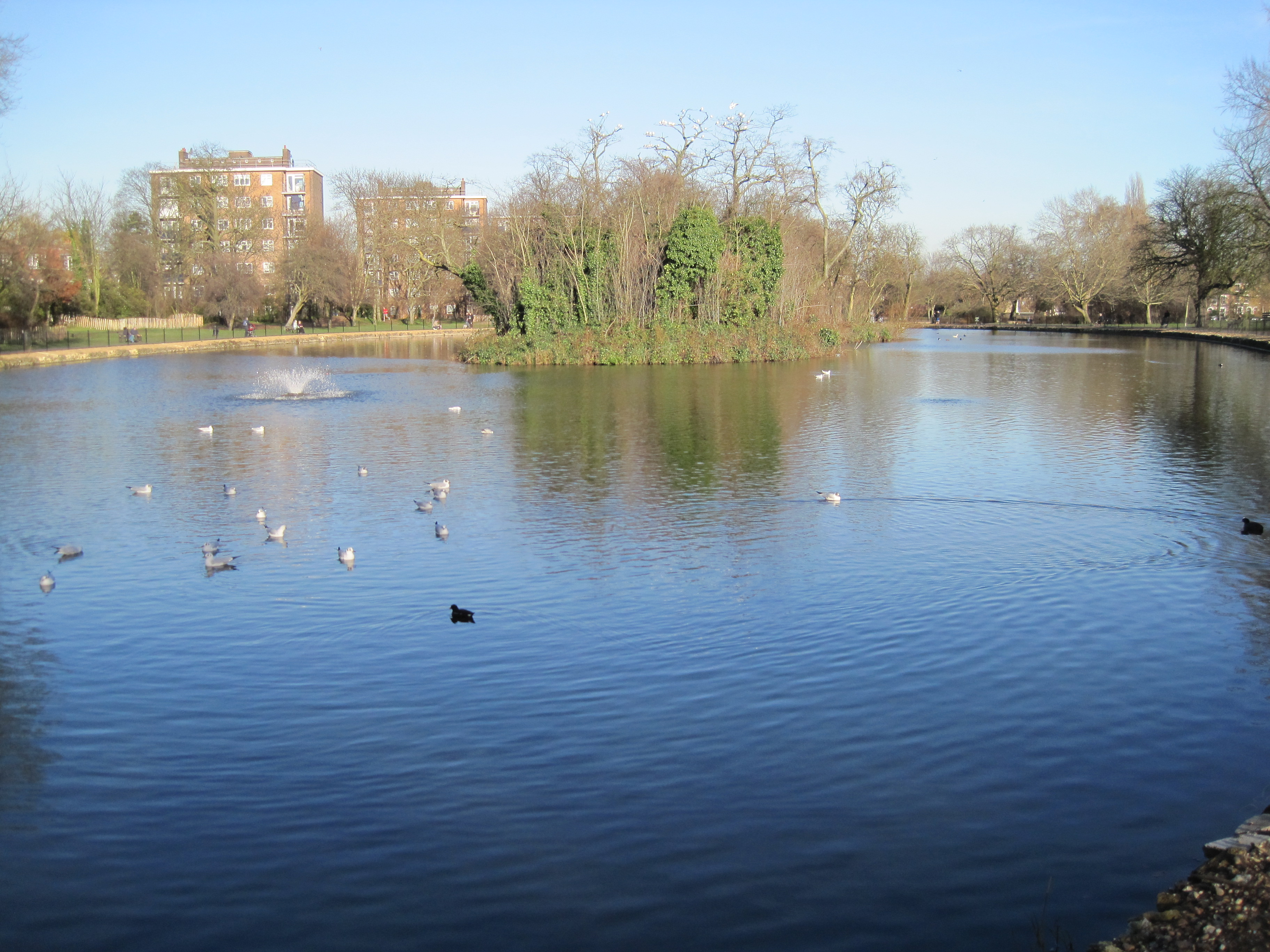
Clissold Park lake

Clissold House is a Grade II listed building; it houses a cafe and serves as an event location. In 2007, Clissold Park was voted the Heart of Hackney, in a poll organised by the council. On 30 March 2007 the Heritage Lottery Fund (HLF) announced the award of a development grant to put forward a bid for a full £4.5 million Park Restoration Grant to restore the park and house to its original 18th-century design. The subsequent bid was successful, and in addition to funds from the HLF and the council, the project also received funding from the Big Lottery Fund. Work commenced in January 2010, and over the next two years an estimated £8.9 million was spent upgrading the house and its surrounding parkland. Plans included:

- Restoring Clissold House
- Restoring a section of the New River
- Extensive maintenance to the two small lakes
- Renovating the animal enclosures
- Creating a new play and wheels park area.

Clissold House was added to the English Heritage 'Heritage at Risk Register' in 1991 but removed in 2012 following the completion of the restoration programme.

== Access ==
Arsenal, Finsbury Park and Manor House on the Piccadilly line are all within a mile of the park, as well as Stoke Newington Overground station. Buses 141, 341 and 393 stop on Green Lanes adjacent to the park.

== In popular culture ==
- Clissold Park, and its pond, feature in the Hank Wangford song "Jogging with Jesus".
- The album Ham by The Chap features a song entitled "Clissold Park".
- The Astrophonica record label features a song by label owners Fracture & Neptune, titled "Clissold" named after the Park.
- In Nick Hornby's 2007 novel Slam, the character Sam and his girlfriend Alicia often go to Clissold Park.
- The Aphex Twin track "19 [Slo]w early morning clissold sunrise" is part named after the park.
- Kate Mascarenhas's debut novel The Psychology of Time Travel (2018) has a chapter set in Clissold Park.
- The 2017 song 'Shadows' by Manik MC (ft. Loyle Carner) opens with the line 'I'm billing up in Clissold Park'.
- The 2026 novel 'Dandelion is Dead' by Rosey Storey has a scene set in Clissold Park.
