= Thomas Croker =

Thomas Croker may refer to:

- Thomas Crofton Croker, Irish antiquary
- Thomas Francis Dillon Croker, his son, British antiquary and poet
