= Francis Nicholson (painter) =

English landscape artist (1753–1844)

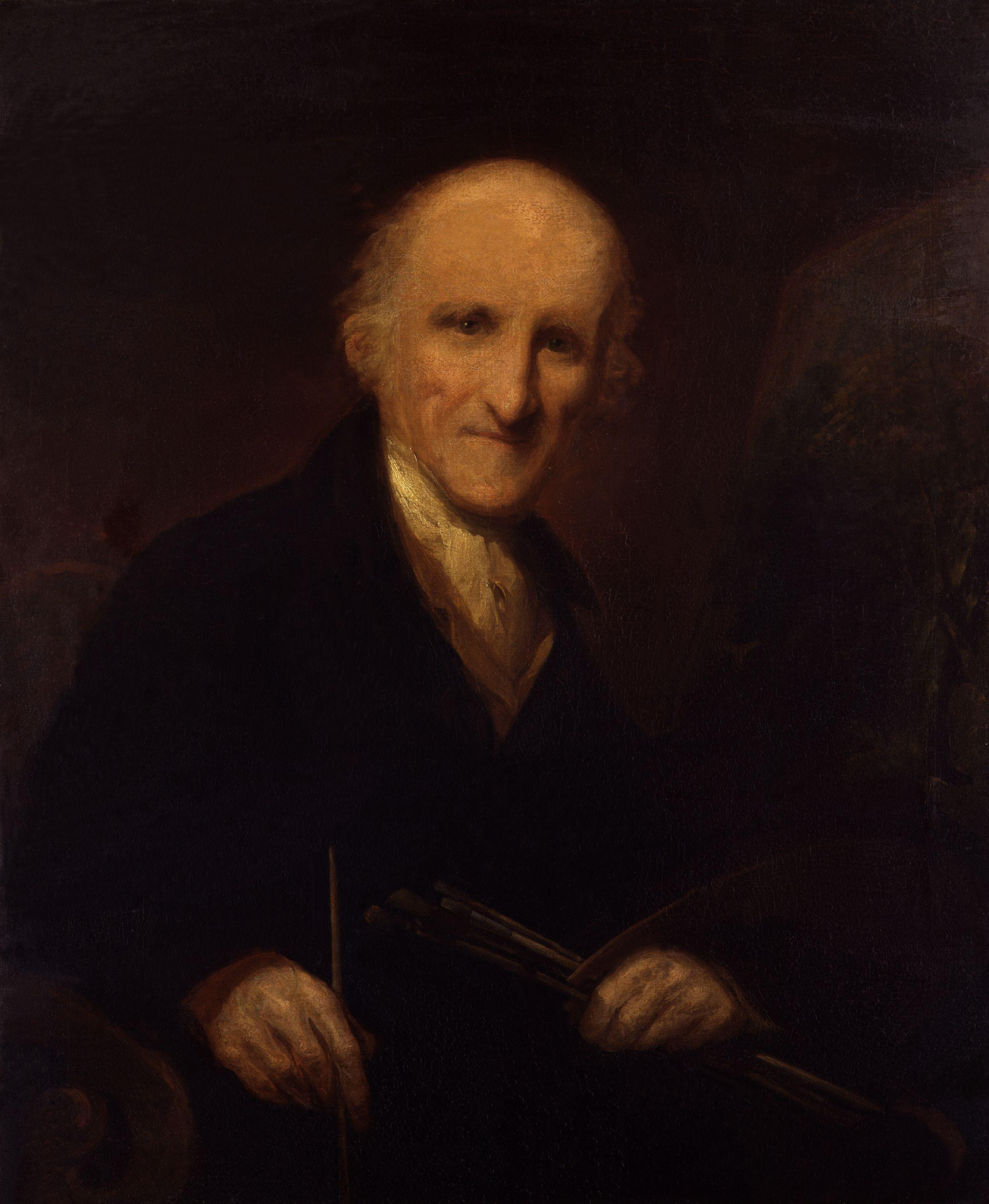
- Self-portrait of Francis Nicholson, circa 1837
- Born: 14 November 1753; Pickering, North Yorkshire, England
- Died: 6 March 1844 (aged 90); London
- Resting place: Brompton Cemetery, London
- Occupation: Artist
- Relatives: Marianne Nicholson (daughter); Thomas Crofton Croker (son-in-law); Thomas F.D. Croker (grandson)

Francis Nicholson (14 November 1753 – 6 March 1844) was a British artist. He worked in watercolour and oil, and is mainly known as a landscape artist.

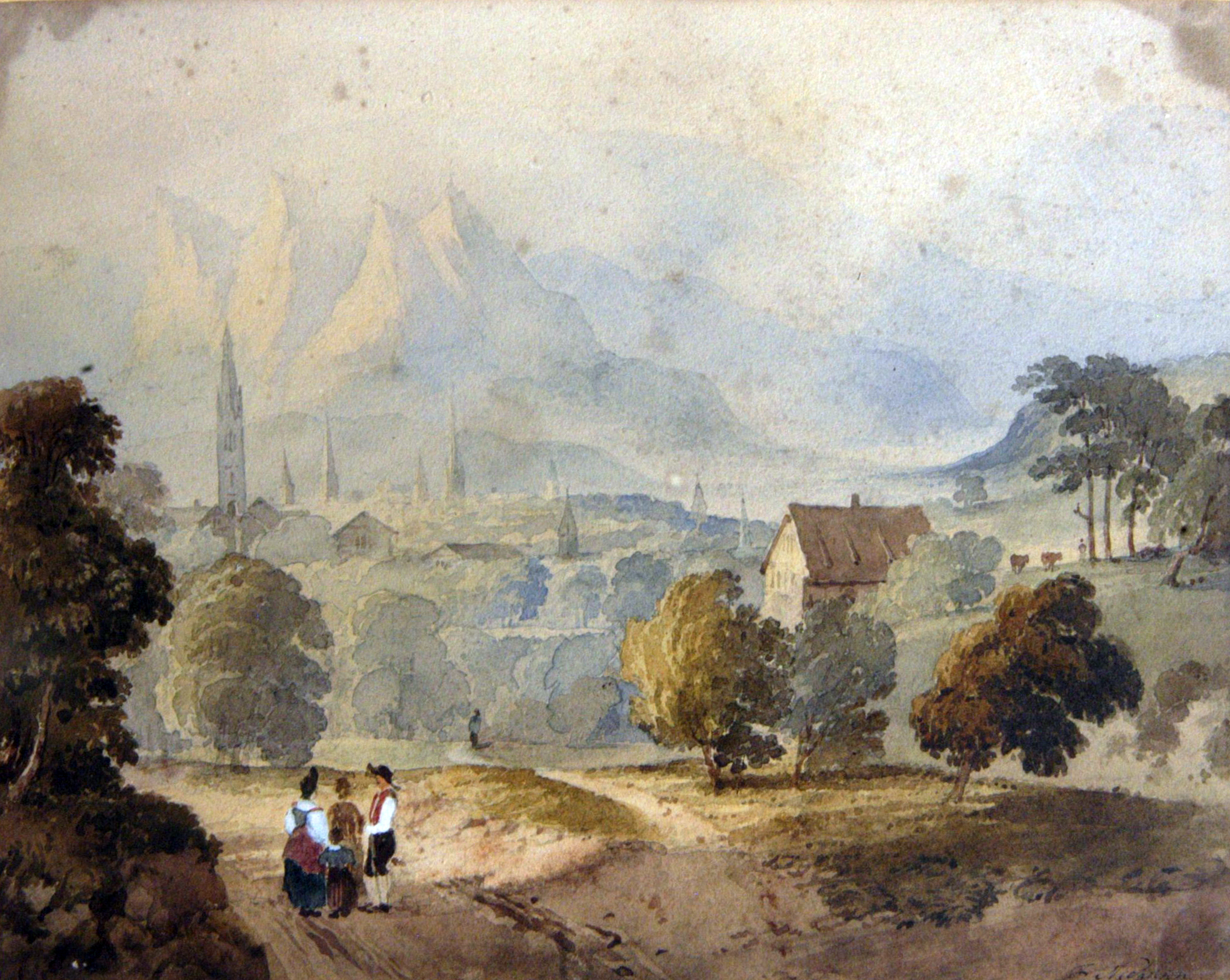
Chur-Coire by Francis Nicholson

== Early life ==
Nicholson was born in Pickering, North Yorkshire.

== Career ==
Nicholson studied with a local artist in Scarborough, before beginning his career in his native Pickering, producing sporting pictures and portraits for a variety of Yorkshire patrons. By the mid-1780s he was also making paintings of country houses, leading him to concentrate on landscapes in watercolour.

From 1789, he contributed views of both Yorkshire and Scotland to exhibitions at the Royal Academy. He also supplied topographical views for the Copper Plate Magazine.

He contributed "Views of England", in collaboration with the engraver Francis Jukes to "The Beauties of England and Wales", Author: Britton, John & Edward Wedlake Brayley - A book published in 18 volumes from 1801 to 1815.

Although his market increasingly became London-based, Nicholson continued to live in Yorkshire - at Whitby, Knaresborough and Ripon. He did not move to London until about 1803. In 1804, he became a founder-member of the Society of Painters in Watercolours, and was a regular and prolific contributor to its exhibitions.

== Later life ==
He wrote a handbook, The practice of drawing and painting landscape from nature, in water colours, which was published in 1820. It sold out and a second edition followed in 1823. Nicholson died in London and is buried there in Brompton Cemetery.

== Legacy ==
His c. 1837 self-portrait is in the National Portrait Gallery. He is known as the Father of water colour painting and also as an early pioneer of lithography, and was much admired by Turner. In October 2012 Pickering and district Civic Society erected a Blue Plaque in his memory on 3 Hungate Pickering. His daughter Marianne Croker was an artist, poet and author, and married Thomas Crofton Croker.
