= Archibald Campbell (philosopher) =

Scottish Church of Scotland minister and moral philosopher

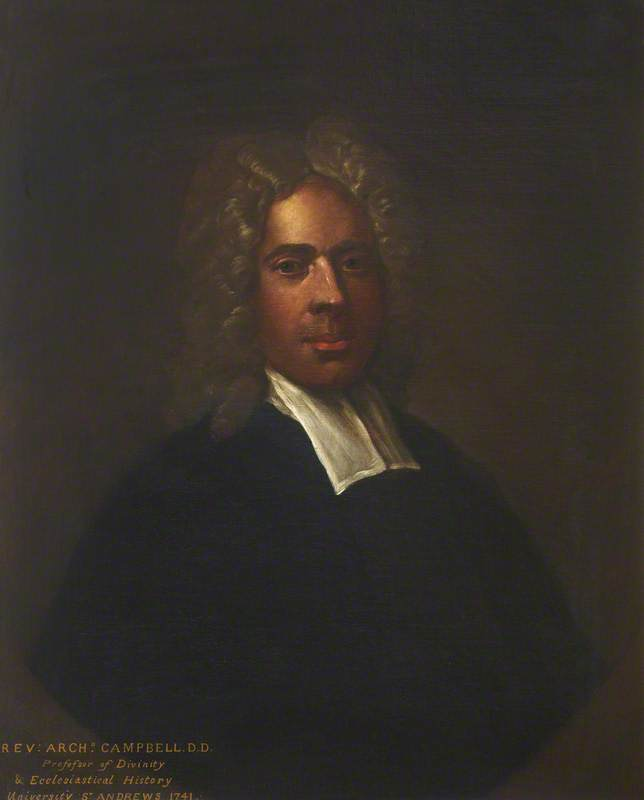
Image of Archibald Campbell

Archibald Campbell (1691 in Edinburgh – 1756 in St Andrews) was a Church of Scotland minister and moral philosopher.

== Biography ==
Archibald Campbell's father was a merchant, and of the Succoth family. Archibald was educated at Edinburgh and Glasgow. He was licensed to preach in 1717, and in 1718 ordained minister of the united parishes of Larbert and Dunipace, Stirlingshire.

In 1726 Campbell published an anonymous treatise on the duty of praying for the civil magistrate. The same year he travelled to London with a manuscript treatise on "Moral Virtue", that based morals on self-love but which was critical of both Mandeville and Francis Hutcheson.

Campbell trusted his book to his friend Alexander Innes, who had been an accomplice of the well-known Psalmanazar. Innes published this as his own in 1728, as Ἀρετηλογία("An Enquiry into the Original of Moral Virtue"). Innes not only won reputation by the work, but a good living in Essex. In August 1730 Campbell went to London, saw Innes, and says that he "made him tremble in his shoes". Campbell consented, however, to an advertisement claiming his own book, but only saying that "for some certain reasons" it had a peered under the name of Innes. Even this was delayed for a time that Innes might not lose a post which he was expecting. Stuart, physician to the queen, was a cousin of Innes, and interceded for him. Campbell was appointed professor of church history in St. Andrews in 1730.

In 1730 Campbell published a Discourse proving that the Apostles were no Enthusiasts. In 1733 he republished his former treatise under his own name as an Enquiry into the Original of Moral Virtue. In the same year he published an Oratio de Vanitate Luminis Naturæ, theological works against Matthew Tindal.

In 1735 Campbell was charged with Pelagianism, on account of Oratio de Vanitate Luminis Naturæ and other works, before the General Assembly of the Church of Scotland, but was acquitted in March 1735-6, with a warning for the future. Remarks upon some passages in books by Professor Campbell, with his Explications, was issued in 1735 by the committee of the general assembly "for purity of doctrine". In 1736 Campbell issued Further Explications with respect to Articles ... wherein the Committee ... have declar’d themseves [sic] not satisfy’d. In 1739 he published The Necessity of Revelation, in answer to Tindal. He died at his estate of Boarhill, near St. Andrews, on 24 April 1756. A book entitled The Authenticity of the Gospel History justified was published posthumously in 1759.

== Family ==
In 1723 Campbell married Christina Watson, daughter of an Edinburgh merchant. Twelve children survived him. His eldest son, Archibald (fl. 1767), was author of "Lexiphanes".
