= Augustus Clissold =

English Swedenborgian, c. 1797–1882

Augustus Clissold (c. 1797–1882) was an English Anglican priest. He is known as a Swedenborgian, who was active in later life publishing his views.

== Life ==
Born in or about 1797, the fifth son of Stephen Clissold (1764–1834) of Stonehouse, near Stroud, Gloucestershire, he had Stephen Clissold the writer as an elder brother. He matriculated at Exeter College, Oxford on 6 December 1814, the same day as his elder brother Henry. He took the ordinary B.A. degree on 19 November 1818, proceeding M.A. on 13 June 1821.

In 1821 Clissold was ordained deacon and in 1823 admitted to priest's orders by Thomas Burgess, Bishop of Salisbury. He held for some time the curacies of St Martin-in-the-Fields and St Mary, Stoke Newington.

Clissold became a follower of Emanuel Swedenborg and withdrew from the Anglican ministry about 1840, but remained nominally connected with the Church of England to the end of his life. He continued to reside in Stoke Newington. He died on 30 October 1882 at his country house, 4 Broadwater Down, Tunbridge Wells, in his 86th year.

== Swedenborgian ==
The Swedenborg Association was started in 1845 for the publication of Swedenborg's scientific works, and merged after its task had been accomplished, with the larger Swedenborg Society. Clissold was chosen as President of the Association. In 1838 he joined the Swedenborg Society as a life member, and in the same year he was placed on the committee. In 1840 he chaired the annual meeting. In 1854 he purchased for the use of the society seventy years' lease of 36 Bloomsbury Street, London, which later became a distribution centre for "New Church" literature.

During the troubled time through which the Swedenborg Society passed in 1859–1860, Clissold supported it financially. He left it £4,000 in his will.

== Works ==
Clissold translated and printed at his own expense Swedenborg's Principia Rerum Naturalium, 2 vols., London, 1845–1846, and Œconomia Regni Animalis (edited by J. J. Garth Wilkinson), 2 vols., London, 1846, both of which he gave to the Swedenborg Association. He was the author of the following:

- The Practical Nature of the Doctrines and alleged Revelations contained in the Writings of Emanuel Swedenborg … in a Letter to the Archbishop of Dublin (R. Whately), London, 1838 (2nd ed. as The Practical Nature of the Theological Writings, London, 1860 [1859])
- Illustrations of the End of the Church, as predicted in Matthew, chap. xxiv., London, 1841
- A Letter to the Rev. J. Bonwell of Preston, upon the Subject of his Sermon on the Perishing in the Gainsaying of Core, London, 1843
- The New Church … addressed to the inhabitants of Preston, London, 1843
- A Review of the Principles of Apocalyptical Interpretation, 3 vols. London, 1845
- A Reply to the Remarks emanating from St. Mary's College, Oscot, on Noble's Appeal in behalf of the Doctrines of Swedenborg, [London], 1849
- The Spiritual Exposition of the Apocalypse, 4 vols., London, 1851
- A Letter to the Vice-Chancellor of the University of Oxford on the Present State of Theology in the Universities and the Church of England, London, 1856
- Swedenborg's Writings and Catholic Teaching, (in answer to the Rev. William James Early Bennett, by A. Clissold), London, 1858 (3rd ed., London, 1881)
- Inspiration and Interpretation: being a review of seven sermons … by J. W. Burgon, … with some remarks upon “The Beginning of the Book of Genesis,” by I. Williams, 7 parts, Oxford, London [printed], 1861–1864
- The Reunion of Christendom, London, 1866
- Swedenborg and his modern Critics, London, 1866
- The Literal and Spiritual Senses of Scripture in their relations to each other and to the Reformation of the Church, London, 1867
- Transition; or, the Passing away of Ages or Dispensations, Modes of Biblical Interpretation, and Churches; being an Illustration of the Doctrine of Development, London, 1868
- The Centre of Unity; What is it? Charity or Authority?, London, 1869
- The Prophetic Spirit in its relation to Wisdom and Madness, London, 1870
- The Present State of Christendom in its relation to the Second Coming of the Lord, London, 1871
- The Creeds of Athanasius, Sabellius, and Swedenborg, examined and compared with each other, London, 1873 (2nd ed. in the same year)
- Paul and David (by A. Clissold), London, 1873
- Sancta Cœna; or the Holy Supper, explained on the principles taught by Emanuel Swedenborg, London, 1874
- The Divine Order of the Universe as interpreted by Emanuel Swedenborg, with especial relation to modern Astronomy, London, 1877
- The Consummation of the Age: being a Prophecy now fulfilled and interpreted in the Writings of Emanuel Swedenborg (extracted from Swedenborg's Arcana Cœlestia, with a preface by A. Clissold), London, 1879

Clissold also published a sermon preached on the death of the Rev. George Gaskin, London, 1829. In 1870 he busied himself with promoting the publication of the Documents concerning the Life and Character of Emanuel Swedenborg 2 vols. 1875–1877, based on originals collected, translated, and annotated by Johann Friedrich Immanuel Tafel. During the last two years of his life he assisted similarly in the publication of Swedenborg's posthumous work on The Brain, 1882, part of the Regnum Animale perlustratum.

== Family ==
Clissold married Elizabeth Crawshay, daughter of William Crawshay, some time after the latter's death in 1834. They had no children. On the marriage, the Newington Park House estate passed to Clissold. It was renamed Clissold Park and the house Clissold House.

== Notes ==
Attribution This article incorporates text from a publication now in the public domain: Stephen, Leslie, ed. (1887). "Clissold, Augustus". Dictionary of National Biography. Vol. 11. London: Smith, Elder & Co.
