= The Psychology of Time Travel =

2018 novel by Kate Mascarenhas

- First edition One of the time travellers in the story modifies an embroidery sampler to include both her birth, and death dates.
- Author: Kate Mascarenhas
- Cover artist: Helen Crawford-White
- Language: English
- Publisher: Head of Zeus (UK); Crooked Lane (US)
- Publication date: 2018 (UK); 2019 (US)
- Publication place: United Kingdom
- Media type: Print

The Psychology of Time Travel is the debut novel published by British author Kate Mascarenhas in 2018.

In the Los Angeles Times the author said that "I thought, well this could actually be a really interesting route into a story, to think about how if we’d invented time travel rather than space travel, what involvement would psychologists have had? What stressors would they identify in time travel? And who would they be trying to recruit?"

== Plot introduction ==
In 1967 four women scientists invent a time travel machine in their laboratory in the Lake District:

- Margaret a baroness turned cosmologist.
- Lucille from Toxteth made radio-waves faster than light.
- Grace was an expert on the behaviour of matter.
- Barbara from Cornwall who specialised in nuclear fission.

At first a rabbit makes the journey to the future and back, then with increased funding, the women journeyed to the future to meet themselves. On their first television interview Barbara had manic-depressive breakdown in front of the cameras, and returned to Cornwall, and the three women continued without her to form an organization called the Conclave to control the technology in which people meet themselves, even their own deaths.

In 2017 Barbara's grand-daughter Ruby received a message from Grace warning about an elderly woman's future violent death. In 2018 a Seychellois museum volunteer Odette finds the body in a bolted room from the inside and is determined, with Ruby having a romance with Grace, to find the truth tied up with time-travel...

== Reception ==
- Sarah Ditum in The Guardian writes 'These are a lot of moving parts for a novel with a standard sense of causality. In one where the origin of any event might lie in the future of the story (and anywhere in the narrative), it takes great skill to give the audience a sure hold on what’s happening/happened/about to happen. There are a few awkward details that emerge strangely late on in the novel, when both smooth plotting and the logic of time travel might dictate that they should be clear from much earlier on; but overall, Mascarenhas handles the challenge she’s devised for herself with remarkable deftness....It’s witty, inventive and unflashily wise about human hearts; Mascarenhas’s future promises to be an exciting one.'
- Jenny Hamilton in Strange Horizons praises the novel in which Margaret 'becomes so determined to prevent a repeat of what happened to Barbara that she does her best to excise any emotions in the Conclave’s employees...She ensures that another kind of disaster will inevitably occur—the creation and endurance of an institute devoid of empathy and suspicious of kindness.' and concludes that The Psychology of Time Travel 'engages with the conventions of its genres while simultaneously managing to feel like no time travel book or mystery I’ve read before. It’s a glorious puzzle box of a story, a near-flawless first-time outing from Kate Mascarenhas that promises to repay multiple rereads.'
- Ian Mond in Locusmag.com explains that the novel is 'led almost entirely by women. This will be viewed by some as a political move on Mascarenhas’s part to address a perceived gender imbalance in science fiction. Even if that’s true, it doesn’t change the fact that we are introduced to a cast of memorable characters', 'a surprising novel not because of its temporal shenanigans – as entertaining as they are – but because it goes beyond those familiar hijinks and explores the human cost of a non-linear existence.'
