= Thomas Crofton Croker =

Irish folklorist (1798-1854)

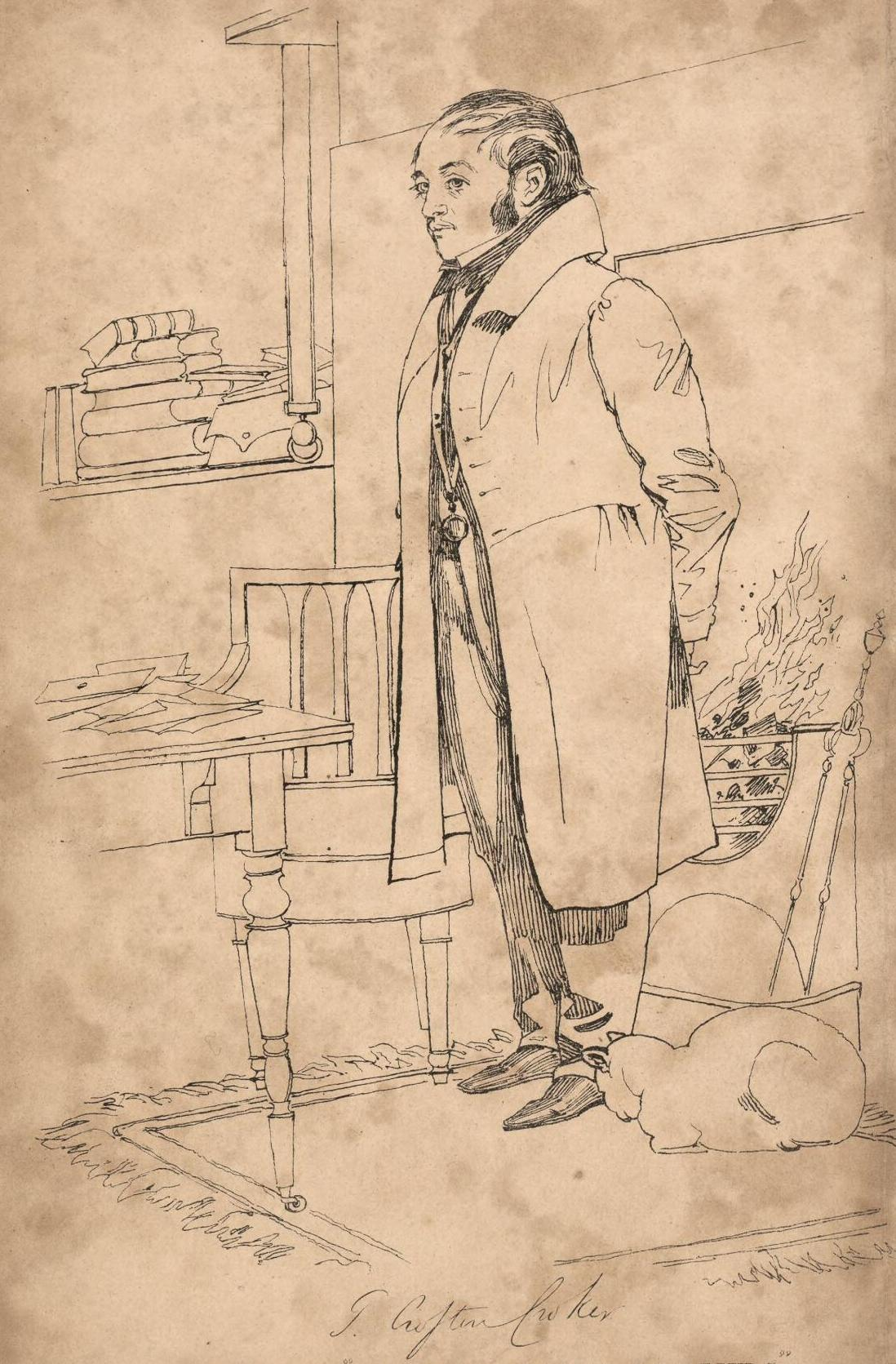
- Crofton Croker at his home. —Sketch by Daniel Maclise. March, 1829.
- Born: 15 January 1798; Cork, Ireland
- Died: 8 August 1854 (aged 56); Old Brompton, London, England
- Resting place: Brompton Cemetery, London
- Occupation: Antiquary
- Known for: Fairy Legends and Traditions of the South of Ireland
- Height: 4 ft 10.5 in (1.486 m)
- Spouse: Marianne Nicholson (m. 1830)
- Children: 1
- Father: Major Thomas Croker
- Relatives: Francis Nicholson (father-in-law); T. F. Dillon Croker (son)

Thomas Crofton Croker (15 January 1798 – 8 August 1854) was an Irish antiquary, best known for his Fairy Legends and Traditions of the South of Ireland (1825–1828), and who also showed considerable interest in Irish song and music.

Although Fairy Legends purported to be an anthology of tales Croker had collected on his field trips, he had lost his manuscript notes and the work had to be reconstructed with the help of friends. He did not acknowledge his debt satisfactorily in the estimation of Thomas Keightley, who voiced his complaint publicly, and soon published his own rival work. The other collaborators generally allowed Croker to take credit, notably William Maginn, though after his death his kinsmen insisted Maginn had written four or more of the tales. Croker retracted ten tales in his third edition of (1834), and after his death, a fourth edition (1859) appeared which was prefaced with a memoir written by his son.

William Butler Yeats, who appropriated a number of tales for his anthology, characterised Croker as belonging to the class of the Anglo-Irish ascendancy, and criticised him for comic distortions of the Irish tradition, an assessment echoed by other Irish critics. Bridget G. MacCarthy wrote a biographical paper that scrutinises Croker's habit of publishing writings by others under his own name. Defenders of Croker include Justin McCarthy and Neil C. Hultin.

== Life and works ==
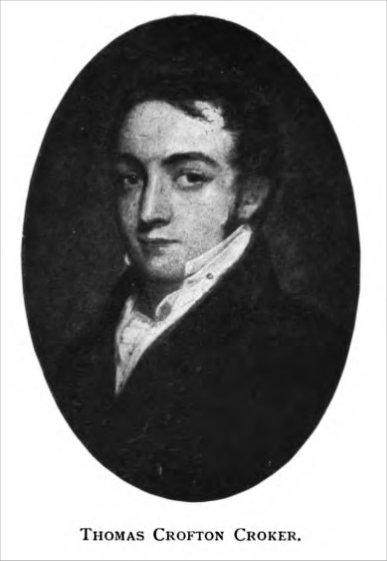
Croker. Family-owned portrait.

Croker was born in the city of Cork, the only son of Major Thomas Croker and his wife, the former Miss Dillon, daughter of Croker Dillon and widow of a Mr Fitton. At age 15, he apprenticed in business. During the years 1812 to 1815, he travelled the south of Ireland and began collecting legends and songs. Croker took one Irish coronach (keening) that he collected in Cork in 1813, and translated it into English prose, which was published in the Morning Post in 1815 and caught the attention of the poet George Crabbe in 1817, through the intermediary of the antiquary Richard Sainthill.

Croker also showed talent as an artist, and his works were exhibited at Cork in 1817 ("pen-sketches of pilot-boats"), but he abandoned art in favour of literary pursuit.

Around 1818, he sent to the poet Thomas Moore a set of about forty ancient Irish air or songs, and some collected poetry, and Moore used the material in editions of his Irish Melodies.

After his father's death on 22 March 1818, the estate was managed by his distant relative (or of no relation), John Wilson Croker who was then Secretary of the Admiralty, and who procured him a position as a clerk there, a position he would retain for thirty years until his retirement in 1850.

He was a man of short stature, measuring 4 feet 10½ inches tall, (Note: According to William Maginn.) and described by Sir Walter Scott as "Little as a dwarf, keen-eyed as a hawk and of very prepossessing manners—something like Tom Moore". (Note: From Scott's journal entry. The two men met at J. G. Lockhart's breakfast party on this date (20 October 1926).)

Croker eventually devoted himself largely to the collection of ancient Irish poetry and Irish folklore.

=== Researches in the South of Ireland ===
Croker's first book, Researches in the South of Ireland (1824), was well-received by fellow-antiquaries. According to Croker in his preface, the book was illustrated with pencil drawings by Miss Nicholson and Alfred Nicholson (1788–1833) (his future wife and brother-in-law) who accompanied him on the field trip gathering material.

=== Fairy Legends ===
Researches was followed by Fairy Legends and Traditions of the South of Ireland (1825–1828), which enjoyed immense popular success. This would be Croker's most important work. Walter Scott praised the book in a letter, and commended it in his own works. (Note: Notes to the 1830 edition of his Waverley Novels, and Demonology and Witchcraft.)

The first part was published in 1825; and was translated into German by the Brothers Grimm (Irische Elfenmärchen, 1826). Parts two and three followed in 1828. Part three consisted of the long Grimm essay on fairies (prefaced to the Elfenmärchen) Croker translated, coupled with a section on Welsh fairy tales written by an unidentified female correspondent.

The first edition of Fairy Legends was illustrated with woodcuts by W. H. Brooke; while the second edition was supplied with original drawings by Cork's Daniel Maclise, though undergoing stylistic modifications by the engraver, Brooke. The third edition, three volumes in one was published in 1834. The work went through a total of six editions during the 19th century. (Note: "reprints are dated 1859, 1862, and 1882".)

It was instrumental in attracting a wider audience to traditional Irish tales, not just within the English-speaking world, but farther abroad. However, Croker modified the tales according to his own inclinations, and has been criticised for adding too literary a style, and contrived humour to the tales.

==== Collaboration controversy ====
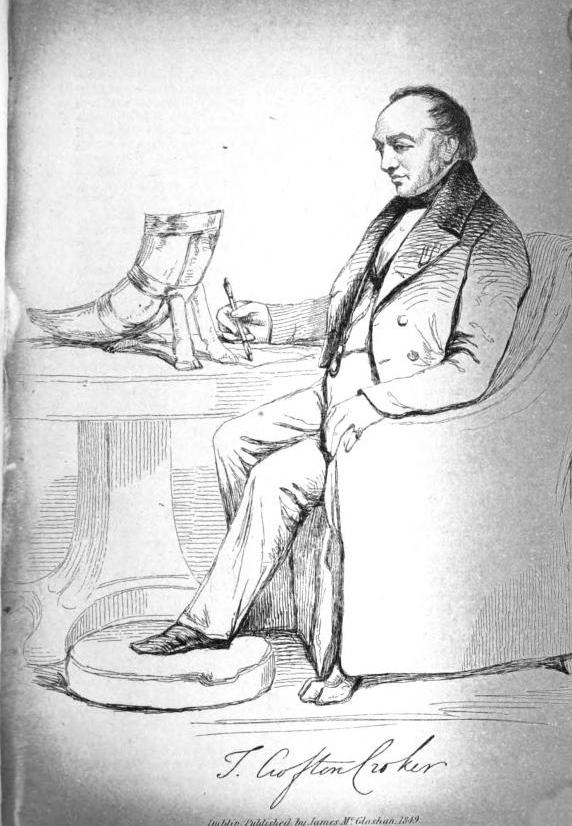
Sitting portrait. —Dublin University Magazine (1849)

Because Croker had lost the manuscript after collecting it from the field, he had to reconstruct the anthology through help from other writers, such as William Maginn, David Richard Pigot, his friend Joseph Humphreys, Thomas Keightley, and R. Adolphus Lynch of Killarney. The first 1825 edition of Fairy Legends and Traditions did not even bear Croker's name, owing to this being a collaborative effort. Humphreys, a Quaker, was a companion during Croker's excursions into the south 1812–1815. (Note: Humphreys later headed "the Deaf and Dumb Institution at Claremont, near Dublin".) Samuel Carter Hall named himself as the contributor of two tales, and Charles Dod of Parliamentary Companion as another collaborator.

In Fairy Legends, the credit for the first piece "The Legend of Knocksheogowna" and three others were claimed by Maginn, including the prominent "Daniel O'Rourke". (Note: The third by Maginn was "The Legend of Bottle Hill", and a fourth was "Fairies or No Fairies" according to the author's brother (Rev. Charles Arthur Maginn, b. 1815, rector of Castletown, Cloyne, Co. Cork since 1840, and rector of Killanully, Cork from 1874 until his death on 2 February 1887 at age 72). But a conflicting claim makes the fourth to be "The Legend of Knockgrafton", according to the reckoning by the author's nephew (Rev. Charles Arthur Maginn, b. c. 1860?, appointed successor at Killanully, then rector of Clonfert, Cloyne in 1892, later of Sheffield), who selected this piece for an anthology of Maginn's tale published in 1933. Both works (i.e., "Fairies or No Fairies" and "Knockgrafton") may well be Maginn's product, bringing the tally to five.) But according to Croker, the manuscript of "Daniel O'Rourke" was in the handwriting of Humphreys, touched up by Maginn, and further altered by Croker before going into print. (Note: Croker was a directly supplying information to the Dublin University Magazine, as MacCarthy points out.) Though such production that entails modification at multiple stages may be poorly countenanced by the modern folklorist, it is pointed out that such methodology is not so distant from the one practised by the Grimms at the time.

Croker eventually took sole credit, and kept all of the proceeds from the book's financial success, but of these collaborators, only Keightley publicly voiced protest, (Note: Though "Other contributors also protested", according to Sean O'Sullivan.) and Keightley went on to publish his own Fairy Mythology in 1828. In the wake of it, Croker published the 1834 third edition that eliminated portions of competing claims, reducing the number of tales from 50 down to 40, and purged of "most of the copious notes", of which the comparative notes Keightley claimed to have supplied. Literary scholar Bridget G. MacCarthy gave a modern-day view criticism of Croker's dodging his way out of attributing the effort of collaborators.

==== Daniel O'Rourke on stage ====
Croker adapted the tale "Daniel O'Rourke" into a Christmas Pantomime under the title "Harlequin and the Eagle", and performed in 1826 at the Adelphi Theatre, for the sake of actor Daniel Terry. The actor had obtained ownership of the theatre, with considerable financial backing from Walter Scott, who was a friend of the actor's. Scott lavished praises on the pantomime at a meeting with Croker. Though it has been told anecdotally that it was Scott's idea to turn this into a play, Croker had this notion earlier, as evidenced in his notes to Fairy Legends. The play was published as Daniel O'Rourke, or Rhymes of a Pantomime, with a second edition appearing in 1828.

=== Noviomagus ===
In 1828, Croker participated in an excavation of the Roman site Noviomagus in Kent, and together with some members of the Society of Antiquaries, formed a club named "Noviomagian Society", for which Croker was voted president. Collecting, antiquarianism, and jocularity were hallmarks of the society.

=== Legends of the Lakes ===
Croker's third book, Legends of the Lakes; or, Sayings and Doings at Killarney (1829) was both a critical and commercial disappointment. It was written in the form of a guided tour through the landscapes of at Killarney, interspersed with legends told in the dialect of the peasantry. He also featured discussions of the music of his friend the Irish piper James Gandsey, of some interest to bagpipe or uilleann pipe musicology.

=== Later life ===
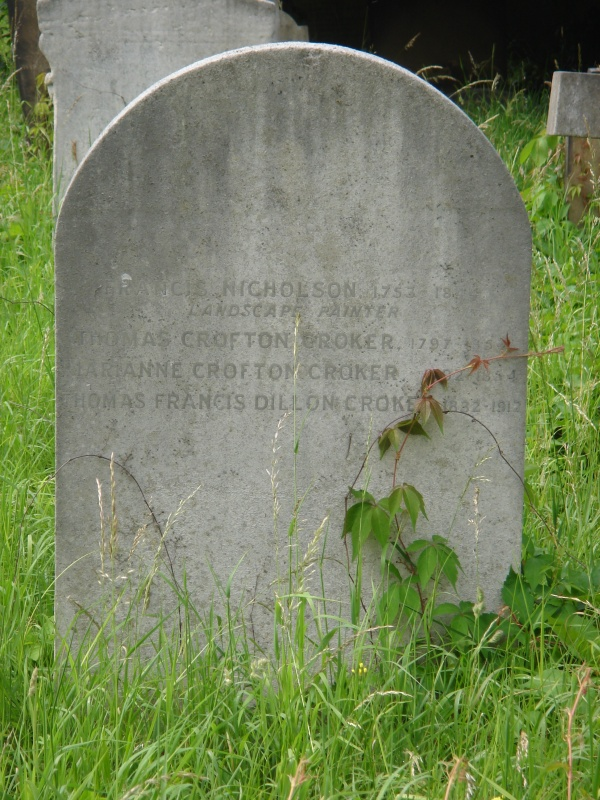
Headstone, Brompton Cemetery, London

Croker married in 1830 Marianne Nicholson (1792–1854), daughter of Francis Nicholson. T. F. Dillon Croker FSA, FRGS, was their son and only child.

Croker assisted in founding the Camden Society (1838) and Percy Society (1840).

He edited The Keen of the South of Ireland (1844) for the Percy Society. The first item in this collection (in the preface) was a keen composed in Irish by the mother of Flory Sullivan, collected in Gougane Barra, Co. Cork in 1813. Croker's translation of it into English got published in the Morning Post in 1815, as already noted above, and caught the notice of poet George Crabbe in 1817. It was an earlier version which was shown to Crabbe in correspondence, (Note: A letter mediated by Richard Sainthill, esq.) but on Crabbe's advice, Croker had revised the translation to a more simplified version, more in keeping with the original Irish. B. G. MacCarthy notes that he did not actually translate the keen himself but pass off the labour of native Irish informants such as Mrs. Harrington as his own, and when left to his own devices, Croker "merely revealed ignorance" of the Irish language.

He and his wife's testimonies about funereal customs, particularly the tradition of keening the deceased are among the earliest and most significant contributions to the understanding of the Irish language lament and the accompanying traditions.

Croker died in Old Brompton, London, England on 8 August 1854, and lies buried in Brompton Cemetery. His wife survived him but briefly, dying on 6 October 1854.

== Analysis ==
=== Attitude to folklore ===
Croker did not present his folklore as he found them, but reinvented them in his own literary style, as pointed out by numerous commentators, even cursory ones. The sort of mixing of folklore and literature was also carried out by contemporaries such as Walter Scott in Scotland. But Croker the antiquarian betrayed a "patronizing" attitude toward his subject, the Irish common folk steeped in tradition.

Croker was an Anglo-Irishman (like Keightley), or as Yeats put it, part of the "harum-scarum Irish gentility" (like Lover). Yeats was not the only one to charge Croker with viewing the lore of the Irish peasantry in a tinted "humorised" light; this gratuitous mockery was also noted, for example, by folklorist Seán Ó Súilleabháin. Yeats repeatedly refers to the class that "imagined [Ireland] as a humorist's Arcadia", and continues "Their work [i.e., of the early folklore collectors] had the dash as well as the shallowness of an ascendant and idle class, and in Croker is touched everywhere with beauty – a gentle Arcadian beauty". (Note: Yeats here is more selectively quoted by the short bio in the Irish Literature anthology, chiefly edited by Cork native Justin McCarthy.)

Literary scholar Neil C. Hultin also defended the author. Hultin was well aware that Irish critics bristled at Croker's comic caricatures of the Irish and their brogue, but refrained from himself criticising Croker for insensitivity. (Note: Quote: "Irish critics, sensitive to the use of dialect and to comic portrayals of Irish peasantry, have accused Croker of an indifference typical of the 'Ascendancy' who ruled the country".) Hultin co-wrote with Warren U. Ober the introduction to Croker's reissued Fairy Legends (1993), which also depicted Croker in a sympathetic light, stating that he showed genuine affection for the peasantry, and commiseration for the oppression felt by Ireland. (Note: Compare MacCarthy (1943), p. 546 who points out that Croker in 1847 was busy "copying [songs] out of the anti-Irish Collection of Constitutional Songs edited by A. Edwards (Cork, 1799)" for his Popular Songs illustrative of the French Invasions of Ireland.) Hultin and Ober have suggested that Croker was trapped between two polar-opposite stereotypes of the Irish: both "intelligent, sensitive" and "headstrong, violent".

=== On ancient manuscript records ===
Croker was contemptuous of Irish annals such as the Annals of the Four Masters, and manuscripts such as the Book of Ballymote which contained narratives and poetry, calling them "the monkish chronicles" or "relics", and stating in a cavalier manner that Irish history would not suffer at all at "the total loss of the legendary records of an age of ignorance and superstition".

He claimed to be capable of reading Irish manuscripts, but it is doubtful whether he had any real proficiency in the Irish language.

== List of works ==
According to Croker's son, Barney Mahoney (2nd ed., 1832) and My Village versus our Village (1833) were actually written by Croker's wife, Marianne.

- Researches in the South of Ireland (1824)
- Fairy Legends and Traditions of the South of Ireland, 3 vols. (1825–28)
- Daniel O'Rourke, 2nd ed. (1828)
- Legends of the Lakes, or Sayings and Doings at Killarney (1829)
- Popular Songs of Ireland (1839)
- The Keen of the South of Ireland (1844)
- Popular Songs, Illustrative of the French Invasions of Ireland, Parts I–IV. (1845–1847), repr. (1847)

Additional titles, and notices of the journals he had contributed to, are listed by Croker's son.
