= Stephen Clissold =

English cricketer (1825–1898)

Personal information
- Born: 17 February 1825; London, England
- Died: 26 May 1898 (aged 73); Cheltenham, Gloucestershire
- Source: Cricinfo, 17 April 2017

Stephen Clissold (17 February 1825 – 26 May 1898) was an English cricketer. He played eight first-class matches for Cambridge University Cricket Club between 1844 and 1848.

== See also ==
- List of Cambridge University Cricket Club players
