= Marianne Croker =

English painter (1791-1854)

- Born: 1791
- Died: 6 October 1854 (aged 62–63); London, England
- Resting place: Brompton Cemetery, London
- Other names: Marianne Nicholson
- Occupation: Watercolour painter
- Spouse: Thomas Crofton Croker (m. 1830; died 1854)
- Father: Francis Nicholson
- Relatives: Thomas F.D. Croker (son)

Marianne Croker (1791–1854) was an English watercolour painter and author of the 19th century.

== Early life ==
Croker was born as Marianne Nicholson. Croker's father was Francis Nicholson, a leading watercolourist. Croker had a brother, Alfred.

== Career ==
Some time after 1818, Croker and her brother Alfred made the acquaintance of Thomas Crofton Croker, then a civil servant with antiquarian interests. The three made a number of trips to the south of Ireland to gather material for a proposed publication – Researches in the South of Ireland (1824) – to which Marianne contributed illustrations.

In Marianne, Thomas Croker found a partner who shared his interests and talents, and the two made numerous visits to Ireland in support of Thomas's later publications dealing with Celtic folklore. Marianne's extensive contributions to Thomas's work are largely unacknowledged.

Croker was the author of two books, Barney Mahoney and My Village Versus Our Village – both published at her request under her husband's name. She also exhibited a number of landscape paintings.

== Personal life ==
In 1830, Croker married Thomas Crofton Croker, a civil servant with interests in antiquity. They had one child, Thomas Francis Dillon Croker, an amateur antiquary and poet.

On 6 October 1854, Croker died in England, two months after the death of her husband. She was buried at Brompton Cemetery in London (in the same grave as her husband) on 10 October.
