= Archibald Campbell (satirist) =

18th-century Scottish satirist

Archibald Campbell (fl. 1767) was a Scottish satirist.

== Life ==
Campbell was the son of the philosopher Archibald Campbell. The younger Campbells' works prove that he was a classical scholar and he, himself, states that he had "all his lifetime dabbled in books". He became purser on a man-of-war and remained at sea, leading "a wandering and unsettled life". In 1745, William Falconer, author of the Shipwreck, who was serving on board the same ship with as campbell, became his servant and received some educational help from him. About 1760, being on a long voyage, Campbell read the Ramblers and, staying shortly thereafter at Pensacola, wrote his Lexiphanes and Sale of Authors. The works remained in manuscript for two years till he reached England. Lexiphanes, a Dialogue in imitation of Lucian, with a subtitle, saying it was "to correct as well as expose the affected style ... of our English Lexiphanes, the Rambler", was issued anonymously in March 1767 and was attributed by Hawkins to Kenrick. The Sale of Authors followed it in June of the same year. Campbell called Johnson "the great corrupter of our taste and language", and says, "I have endeavour'd to ... hunt down this great unlick'd cub". In the Sale of Authors, the "sweetly plaintive Gray" was put up to auction, with Whitefield, Hervey, Sterne, Hoyle, etc. to determine their relative worth as writers.

== Other works ==
Lexiphanes itself found an imitator in 1770 in George Colman, who used that signature to a philological squib, and a fourth edition of the real work, which still anonymous, was issued at Dublin in 1774. After this there is no evidence of anything relating to this author. The History of the Man alter God’s own Heart, issued anonymously in 1761, generally attributed to Peter Annet, is asserted to have been written by Archibald Campbell, and this view has been adopted in the 1883 edition of Halkett and Laing’s Dictionary of Anonymous and Pseudonymous Literature , ii. 1160. If so, the Letter to the Rev. Dr. Samuel Chandler, from the Writer of the History of the Man after God's own Heart, is also Campbell's.
