= Susan Clymer =

American author of children's books

Susan Clymer (born 1951) is an American author of children's books.

== Publications ==
Clymer has published fifteen books, eleven of them through Scholastic Corporation. She is perhaps best known for her Animals in Room 202 series, including There's a Hamster in my Lunchbox, There's a Frog in my Sleepingbag, There's a Tarantula in my Homework, and There's a Rabbit in my Backpack.

== Residency ==
Clymer currently lives in Kansas. There she divides her time between writing and directing residencies as a visiting author in schools.
