= Kate Mascarenhas =

British writer

Kate Mascarenhas is a writer born in 1980 of mixed heritage, with a white Irish father and a brown British mother. Mascarenhas grew up in Oldham with family in Ireland and Seychelles.

== Early life ==
Mascarenhas's father, who was an alcoholic, died of a heart attack when she was aged 22.

Mascarenhas studied English at the University of Oxford and applied psychology at the University of Derby. She gained her PhD in literary studies and psychology at the University of Worcester.

Mascarenhas became fascinated by dolls' houses when she was nine, after reading a library book about Queen Mary's Dolls' House. Her father made her an intricate dolls' house when she was a child.

== Career ==
Previously she has been an advertising copywriter, bookbinder, and doll’s house maker and has made dioramas for her novels.

Mascarenhas trained as a psychologist but returned to writing when she was 32 after being diagnosed with bipolar disorder.

Her first novel, The Psychology of Time Travel, was published in 2018 by Head of Zeus in the UK and by Crooked Lane in the US and was shortlisted for the Arthur C. Clarke Award. The Guardian called her The Psychology of Time Travel "a dazzling genre-defying debut".

Her second novel, The Thief on the Winged Horse, was published in August 2020. Hokey Pokey, her third novel, was published June 2023.

In November 2020, Mascarenhas was featured on Woman's Hour discussing The Thief on the Winged Horse, and her passion for dolls.

== Personal life ==
Mascarenhas lives with her husband in a small terraced house.

== Novels ==
- The Psychology of Time Travel (Head of Zeus, 2018, ISBN 9781788540124)
- The Thief on the Winged Horse (Head of Zeus, 2020, ISBN 9781789543810)
- Hokey Pokey (Head of Zeus, 2023, ISBN 9781789543858)
