= Renato Cirell Czerna =

Brazilian lawyer, professor and writer

Renato Cirell Czerna (São Paulo, January 26, 1922 – March 19, 2005) was an Italian-born Brazilian lawyer, professor, and writer. One of the founders of the Brazilian Institute of Philosophy, he wrote predominantly on the philosophy of law. He was a specialist on the thought of G. W. F. Hegel and F. W. J. Schelling.

He was a professor at the universities of São Paulo, Rome, and Naples.

== Books ==
- Natureza e espírito. Prefácio de Miguel Reale. São Paulo: Martins, 1949. 143 p.
- A dialética do “Faust”. São Paulo, 1950.
- Filosofia como conceito e história. São Paulo, 1950. (Tese).
- A filosofia jurídica de Benedetto Croce: situação e crítica do sistema no historicismo italiano contemporâneo. São Paulo: Revista dos Tribunais. 1955. 235 p.
- Ensaios de filosofia jurídica e social. São Paulo: Saraiva, 1965. 236 p.
- O direito e o estado no idealismo germânico: posições de Schelling e Hegel. São Paulo, 1981. 250 p.
- Justiça e História: ensaios. Apresentação Ubiratan de Macedo. São Paulo: Convívio/Editora Universidade de São Paulo, 1987. 459 p. (Biblioteca do pensamento brasileiro, 7).
- O pensamento filosófico e jurídico de Miguel Reale. São Paulo: Saraiva, 1999. 190 p.
