= Bridget G. MacCarthy =

Irish academic and writer

- Born: 7 June 1904; Cork
- Died: April 1993 (aged 88); Cork
- Occupation: Professor of English

Bridget G. MacCarthy (7 June 1904 – April 1993) was an Irish academic and writer. She has been described as one of the most important female cultural and literary historians.

== Biography ==
Bridget Gerard MacCarthy was born to Jeremiah MacCarthy and Bridget Quinlan of 7 Wellington Square, Cork on 7 June 1904. She was the youngest daughter of four girls and a boy. She was educated in University College Cork and completed her BA in 1925. She followed that with an MA in 1927 and went on to do a PhD in Cambridge in 1940 on Women's contribution to the development of the English novel: 1621-1818. MacCarthy worked as a teacher in Edinburgh, in the Craiglockhart Roman Catholic Training College. She then moved on to become a lecturer in the Department of Education in Cork and finished as a Professor of English in University College Cork. She wrote two volumes of The Female Pen which were published in 1944 and 1947. These were her defining works. She did complete several plays and essays and she was published in Studies: An Irish Quarterly Review and The Dublin Magazine. In her personal life she married but she and her husband only lived together for a short time. She lived with her aunt after her mother died. MacCarthy retired in 1966 and gave her entire library away. She died in April 1993.

== Works ==
=== Literary criticism ===
- The psychology of genius; studies in Browning. London: University of London Press, 1936.
- Women writers, their contribution to the English novel, 1621-1744. Cork: Cork University Press, 1944.
- Some problems of child welfare, editor. Cork: Cork University Press, 1945.
- The later women novelists, 1744–1818. Cork: Cork University Press, 1947.
- Women writers : their contribution to the English novel, 1621–1744, 1977.
- The female pen: women writers and novelists 1621-1818 / B.G. MacCarthy; with a preface by Janet Todd. Cork: Cork University Press, 1994.

=== Plays ===
- The whip hand: a comedy in three acts. Dublin: Duffy, 1943.
- “Raven of Wicklow: An Historical Play in Five Scenes”. Studies: An Irish Quarterly Review, 35.140 (1946): pp. 481–512. .

=== Edited poetry collections ===
- Despite fools' laughter; poems by Terence MacSwiney; edited by B. G. MacCarthy. Dublin: M. H. Gill and son, 1944.

=== Journal articles ===
- MacCarthy, B. G., et al. “The Cinema as a Social Factor [with Comments].” Studies: An Irish Quarterly Review, 33.129 (1944): pp. 45–67.
- “E. ɶ. Somerville and Martin Ross.” Studies: An Irish Quarterly Review, 34.134 (1945): pp. 183–94.
- “James Boswell: A Problem”. Studies: An Irish Quarterly Review, 36.143 (1947): pp. 319–25. JSTOR, .
- Thackeray in Ireland, 1951

=== Reviews ===
- Caroline Norton by Alice Ackland. Studies: An Irish Quarterly Review, 38.149 (1949): pp. 109–11.
- John Dryden. The Clark Lectures, 1948-49 by David Nicol Smith. Studies: An Irish Quarterly Review, 39.155 (1950): pp. 347–347.
