= Avanti Centrae =

American novelist

- Born: Paulding, Ohio
- Education: Purdue University
- Occupation: Novelist
- Writing career
- Genres: Thriller, action-adventure, mystery
- Website: www.avanticentrae.com

Avanti Centrae is an American novelist who is the author of the VanOps (Vanguard Operations) thriller book series and the novel Cleopatra's Vendetta.

== Biography ==
Centrae was born as Kathy Baker in Paulding, Ohio.

She graduated as valedictorian of Fremont High School in 1982 and earned a computer technology degree from Purdue University in 1986. Shortly after college, she moved to California, where she had a short stint as a journalist at a Sacramento, California weekly newspaper. While in her 20s, she legally changed her name from Kathy Baker to Avanti Centrae. For several summers she worked as a raft guide on the rapids of the American River in California.

She worked as a Silicon Valley IT executive before quitting, at the age of 53, to pursue her dream of being an author.

Her debut novel, The Lost Power is the first book in the VanOps action-adventure/thriller series. The novel deals with the quest for superconductivity and electromagnetic pulse weapons, an idea influenced by her experience as an IT executive in Silicon Valley.

Centrae is a member of the Author's Guild, Sister's in Crime, and the International Thriller Writers. She resides in Northern California.

== Bibliography ==
- VanOps: The Lost Power - Black Opal Books (2019) - ISBN 9781644371596
- VanOps: Solstice Shadows - Thunder Creek Press (2020) - ISBN 9781734966251
- VanOps: The Doomsday Medallion - Thunder Creek Press (2022) - ISBN 9781734966299
- Cleopatra's Vendetta - A Stryker Thriller - Thunder Creek Press (2022) - ISBN 9798986316406
- The Picasso Job - Thunder Creek Press (2025) - ISBN 9798986316475
