= Thomas Francis Dillon Croker =

Thomas Francis Dillon Croker FSA FRGS (1831–1912) was a British antiquary and poet. In the literature, he is usually referred to as "T. F. Dillon Croker".

He was the only child of Thomas Crofton Croker, and Marianne Croker; his parents collaborated closely, and the son revised and edited some of their works.

At the time of his father's death, he was a clerk at P&O.
