= List of English writers (A–C) =

List of English writers lists writers in English, born or raised in England (or who lived in England for a lengthy period), who already have Wikipedia pages. References for the information here appear on the linked Wikipedia pages. The list is incomplete – please help to expand it by adding Wikipedia page-owning writers who have written extensively in any genre or field, including science and scholarship. Please follow the entry format. A seminal work added to a writer's entry should also have a Wikipedia page. This is a subsidiary to the List of English people. There are or should be similar lists of Irish, Scots, Welsh, Manx, Jersey, and Guernsey writers.

Abbreviations: AV = Authorized King James Version of the Bible, also as = also wrote/writes as, c. = circa; century, cc. = centuries; cleric = Anglican priest, fl. = floruit, RC = Roman Catholic, SF = science fiction, YA = young adult fiction

== A ==
- A. W. (fl. 1602), poet
- Edwin Abbott Abbott (1838–1926), theologian and novelist
- Gilbert Abbott à Beckett (1811–1856), humorist
- George Abbot (1562–1633), writer, AV translator and cleric
- Lascelles Abercrombie (1881–1938), poet and critic
- Paul Ableman (1927–2006), playwright and novelist
- J. R. Ackerley (1896–1967), autobiographer, novelist and playwright
- Rodney Ackland (1908–1991), playwright, actor and screenwriter
- Peter Ackroyd (born 1949), novelist and biographer
- Eliza Acton (1799–1859), poet and cookery writer
- Harold Acton (1904–1994), writer and scholar
- Hazel Adair (1900–1990), novelist
- Paul Adam (born 1958), novelist
- Ruth Adam (1907–1977), novelist and non-fiction writer
- Charles Warren Adams (also as Charles Felix, 1833–1903), novelist and lawyer
- Douglas Adams (1952–2001), novelist and scriptwriter
- Francis Adams (1862–1893), essayist and dramatist
- John Adams, (pre-1670–1738), cartographer and gazetteer compiler
- Poppy Adams (living), novelist and TV screenwriter
- Richard Adams (1920–2016), novelist, Watership Down
- Sarah Flower Adams (1805–1848), poet and hymnist
- Donald Adamson (1939–2024), writer and historian
- John Adamson (1787–1855), antiquary, poet and translator
- Arthur St. John Adcock (1864–1930), novelist and editor
- Fleur Adcock (1934–2024), poet
- Joseph Addison (1672–1719), essayist and poet, The Spectator
- Percy Addleshaw (wrote as Percy Hemingway, 1866–1916), writer and poet
- Mark Adlard (born 1932), novelist
- James Agate (1877–1947), diarist and critic
- John Aglionby (died 1609/1610), scholar, AV translator and cleric
- Georgette Agnew (1865-1957), writer and poet
- Grace Aguilar (1816–1847), novelist and writer
- Allan Ahlberg (born 1939), children's writer
- Robert Aickman (1914–1981), novelist and conservationist
- Joan Aiken (1924–2004), novelist
- Arthur Aikin (1783–1854), science writer
- Lucy Aikin (1781–1864), children's writer, biographer and historian
- John Aikin (1747–1822), writer and physician
- Alfred Ainger (1837–1904), biographer and critic
- Ruth Ainsworth (1908–1984), children's writer
- William Harrison Ainsworth (1805–1882), novelist
- Catherine Aird (Kinn Hamilton McIntosh, living), crime fiction writer
- Mark Akenside (1721–1770), poet
- William Alabaster (1567–1640), poet, playwright and cleric
- James Albery (1838–1889), playwright
- Alice Albinia (born 1976), travel writer
- Mary Alcock (c. 1742–1798), poet and essayist
- Naomi Alderman (born 1974), novelist and game writer
- Thomas Aldham or Aldam, (c. 1616–1660), writer and Quaker
- Richard Aldington (1892–1962), novelist and poet
- Brian Aldiss (1925–2017), novelist
- Henry Aldrich (1647–1710), poet and theologian
- Horace Alexander (1889–1989), writer on India, ornithologist and Quaker
- Miriam Alexander (1879-19??), historical novelist
- Alan F. Alford (born 1961), writer on mythology
- Monica Ali (born 1967), novelist
- Cyril Alington (1872–1955), novelist and writer
- Nicholas Allan (living), children's writer
- Rupert Allason (also as Nigel West, b. 1951), historian and thriller writer
- James Allen (1864–1912), self-help writer and poet
- Walter Allen (1911–1995), novelist and critic
- Margery Allingham (1904–1966), novelist, Albert Campion
- Drummond Allison (1921–1943), poet
- Kenneth Allott (1912–1973), poet and anthologist
- Kenneth Allsop (1920–1973), writer and broadcaster
- E. M. Almedingen (1898–1971), novelist, biographer and children's writer
- John Almon (1737–1804), journalist and anthologist
- David Almond (born 1951), novelist and children's writer
- Vincent Alsop (c. 1630–1703), writer and dissenting minister
- Al Alvarez (1929–2019), poet and writer
- Moniza Alvi (born 1968), poet and writer
- Eric Ambler (1909–1998), novelist and screenwriter
- Isaac Ambrose (1604–1663/1664), writer, diarist and cleric
- Elizabeth Amherst (c. 1716–1779), poet and naturalist
- Kingsley Amis (1922–1995), poet and novelist, Lucky Jim
- Martin Amis (1949–2023), novelist
- Thomas Amory (c. 1691–1788), novelist and miscellanist
- Thomas Amory (1701–1774), poet and dissenting cleric
- Valerie Anand (also as Flora Buckley, 1937–2024), novelist
- Patrick Anderson (1915–1979), poet
- Rachel Anderson (born 1943), children's writer
- Verily Anderson (1915–2010), writer
- Lancelot Andrewes (1555–1626), scholar, AV translator and cleric
- Roger Andrewes (fl. 1610s), scholar, AV translator and cleric
- Julie Andrews (born 1935), children's writer and actress
- Miles Peter Andrews (1742–1814), playwright and poet
- Norman Angell (1872–1967), Nobel Prize winner, political writer and economist
- Jane Anger (fl. 1589), pamphleteer
- Charlotte Anley (1796–1893), didactic novelist and writer
- George Anson, 1st Baron Anson (1697–1762), writer, explorer and admiral
- Christopher Anstey (1724–1805), writer and poet
- Evelyn Anthony (1926–2018) historical novelist and thriller writer
- Charles James Apperley (wrote as Nimrod, 1777–1843), hunting and racing writer
- Lisa Appignanesi (born 1946), writer and historian
- Roy Apps (born 1951), children's writer
- Arthur John Arberry (1905–1969), orientalist and translator
- Harriet Arbuthnot (1793–1834), political diarist
- John Arbuthnot (1667–1735), satirist and polymath
- Fred Archer (1915–1999), countryside writer
- Jeffrey Archer (1940-2026), novelist and politician
- Philip Ardagh (born 1961), children's writer
- John Arden (1930–2012), playwright and novelist
- Edward Ardizzone (1900–1979), children's writer and illustrator
- Reginald Arkell (1882–1959), novelist, playwright and screenwriter
- Michael Arlen (originally Dikran Kouyoumdjian, 1895–1956), essayist, playwright and novelist
- John Arlott (1914–1991), cricket writer and commentator
- Robert Armin (c. 1563–1615), playwright and actor
- Simon Armitage (born 1963), poet, playwright and novelist
- Annie Armitt (1850–1933), novelist, poet and essayist
- Martin Armstrong (1882–1974), novelist and poet
- Peter Armstrong (born 1957), poet and psychotherapist
- Richard Armstrong (1903–1986), novelist, historian and children's writer
- Elizabeth von Arnim (also as Alice Cholmondeley, 1866–1941), novelist
- Edwin Arnold (1832–1904), poet and journalist
- Edwin Lester Arnold (1857–1935), writer and novelist
- Elizabeth Arnold (born 1944), children's writer
- Matthew Arnold (1822–1888), poet, Dover Beach
- Richard Arnold (died c. 1521), chronicler and merchant
- Thomas Arnold (1795–1842), educator and historian
- Thomas Walker Arnold (1864–1930), Islamist scholar
- William Delafield Arnold (1828–1859), novelist and colonial administrator
- Pat Arrowsmith (1930–2023), novelist, poet and non-fiction writer
- Anthony Ascham (c. 1614–1650), scholar and politician
- Roger Ascham (c. 1515–1568), writer and scholar
- John Ash (1724–1779), lexicographer and Baptist minister
- John Ash (1948–2019), poet and travel writer
- Maurice Ash (1917–2003), writer on environment and planning
- Russell Ash (1946–2010), writer
- Timothy Garton Ash (born 1955), historian
- Elizabeth Ashbridge (1713–1755), autobiographer and Quaker
- Joseph Ashby-Sterry (1836 or 1838–1917), poet, novelist and journalist
- Geoffrey Ashe (1923–2022), cultural historian
- Thomas Ashe or Ash (fl. 1600–1618), legal writer
- Thomas Ashe (1770–1835), novelist and miscellanist
- Thomas Ashe (1836–1889), poet
- Michael Asher (born 1953) author and explorer
- Daisy Ashford (1881–1972), child author, The Young Visiters
- Lindsay Ashford (born 1959), crime novelist and journalist
- Elias Ashmole (1617–1692), antiquary and patron
- Carl Ashmore (born 1968), children's writer
- Will Ashon (born 1969), novelist and music writer
- Francis Leslie Ashton (1904–1994), novelist
- Andrea Ashworth (born 1969), writer and scholar
- Anne Askew (1521–1546), poet, writer and martyr
- Nadeem Aslam (born 1966), novelist
- Elizabeth Mary Aslin (1926–1989), art historian
- Cynthia Asquith (1887–1960), novelist and diarist
- Herbert Asquith (1881–1947), poet and novelist
- Margot Asquith (1864–1935), memoirist
- Nicholas Assheton (1590–1625), diarist
- Mary Astell (1666–1731), poet and writer
- Judy Astley (living), novelist and illustrator
- Edwin Atherstone (1788–1872), poet and novelist
- Diana Athill (1917–2019), editor, novelist and memoirist
- Blanche Atkinson (1847–1911), novelist and children's writer
- James Atkinson (1780–1852), scholar
- Kate Atkinson (born 1952), novelist
- William Atkinson (died 1509), translator
- David Attenborough (born 1926), writer, naturalist and broadcaster
- Francis Atterbury (1663–1732), writer and bishop
- Mabel Lucie Attwell (1879–1964), children's writer and illustrator
- Penelope Aubin (1679–1738), poet, novelist and translator
- John Aubrey (1626–1697), writer and antiquary, Brief Lives
- John Audelay or Awdelay, (died c. 1426), poet and cleric
- W. H. Auden (1907–1973), poet
- Stacy Aumonier (1877–1928), novelist, story writer and essayist
- Jane Austen (1775–1817), novelist, Pride and Prejudice
- Katherine Austen (1629 – c. 1683), diarist and poet
- Alfred Austin (1835–1913), Poet Laureate
- John Austin (1790–1859), legal philosopher
- John Langshaw Austin (1911–1960), philosopher and translator
- Sarah Austin (1793–1867), translator
- Edward Aveling (1849–1898), writer, pamphleteer and translator
- Peter Avery (1923–2008), scholar and translator
- Jack Avon (born 1967), financial writer and consultant
- Tash Aw (born 1971), novelist and non-fiction writer
- Christopher Awdry (born 1940), children's writer
- Wilbert Awdry (Rev. W. Awdry, 1911–1997), children's writer and cleric, Thomas the Tank Engine
- Alan Ayckbourn (born 1939), playwright
- A. J. Ayer (1910–1989), philosopher
- Pam Ayres (born 1947), poet and songwriter
- Michael Ayrton (1921–1975), writer and artist
- Shamim Azad, (born 1952), writer and translator
- Trezza Azzopardi, (born 1961), novelist

== B ==
- Charles Babbage (1791–1871), polymath
- Gervase Babington (1549/1550–1610), theologian and bishop
- David Baddiel (born 1964), novelist and comedian
- Robert Baden-Powell (1857–1941), writer and army officer, Scouting for Boys
- Edmund Backhouse (1873–1944), orientalist and autobiographer
- Anne Bacon (c. 1528–1610), translator and correspondent
- Francis Bacon (1561–1626), essayist, New Atlantis
- Phanuel Bacon (1699–1783), playwright and poet
- John F. Baddeley (1854–1940), travel writer and journalist
- Robert Bage (1730–1801), novelist and radical
- Walter Bagehot (1826–1877), economist and essayist
- Desmond Bagley (1923–1983), horror novelist
- Enid Bagnold (1889–1981), novelist and playwright, National Velvet
- Richard Bagot (1860–1921), novelist and essayist
- David Bailey (living), story writer
- H. C. Bailey (1878–1961), novelist
- Hilary Bailey (1936–2017), biographer and editor
- Nathan Bailey (died 1742), philologist
- Paul Bailey (1937–2024), novelist and dramatist
- Philip James Bailey (1816–1902), poet
- Samuel Bailey (1791–1870), philosopher and economist
- Beryl Bainbridge (1932–2010), novelist
- Denys Val Baker (1917–1984), novelist and story writer
- Harriet Baker (born 1991), critic and biographer
- Henry Baker (1698–1774), naturalist and poet
- Samuel Baker (1821–1893), writer and explorer
- Nigel Balchin (1908–1970), novelist and screenwriter
- John Bale (1495–1563), playwright and bishop
- J. G. Ballard (1930–2009), novelist
- Dacre Balsdon (1901–1977), novelist and historian
- Samuel Bamford (1788–1872), writer and dialect poet
- John Codrington Bampfylde (1764–1796/1797), poet
- Richard Bancroft (1544–1610), AV translator and archbishop
- Isabella Banks (1821–1897), novelist and poet
- Lynne Reid Banks (1929–2024), novelist
- Anna Laetitia Barbauld (1743–1825), poet and children's writer
- W. N. P. Barbellion (real name Bruce Frederick Cummings, 1889–1919), diarist
- Margaret Barber (Michael Fairless, 1869–1901), novelist and children's writer
- Alexander Barclay (c. 1476–1552), poet and translator
- Florence L. Barclay (1862–1921), novelist
- James Barclay (born 1965), novelist
- John Baret (died c. 1580), lexicographer
- Owen Barfield (1898–1997), novelist, poet and philosopher
- Richard Harris Barham (wrote as Thomas Ingoldsby, 1788–1845), novelist and poet, The Ingoldsby Legends
- Maurice Baring (1874–1945), playwright, novelist and poet
- Sabine Baring-Gould (1834–1924), novelist, hymnist and cleric
- A. L. Barker (1918–2002), novelist
- Cicely Mary Barker (1895–1973), children's and religious writer and illustrator
- Clive Barker (born 1952), writer, film director and visual artist
- Elspeth Barker (1940–2022), novelist
- George Granville Barker (1913–1991), poet and novelist
- Jane Barker (1652–1732), poet and novelist
- Mary Anne Barker (1831–1911), writer and poet
- Nicola Barker (born 1966), novelist
- Pat Barker (born 1943), novelist
- Raffaella Barker (born 1964), novelist and journalist
- Sebastian Barker (1945–2014), poet
- Clement Barksdale (1609–1687), poet and cleric
- George Barlow (wrote as James Hinton, 1837–1913/1914), poet
- William Barlow (died 1613), scholar, AV translator and bishop
- Catherine Isabella Barmby (1817–1853), socialist and feminist writer
- Mordaunt Roger Barnard (1828–1906), translator and cleric
- Kitty Barne (1883–1961), children's writer
- Barnabe Barnes (1568 or 1569–1609), poet and playwright
- Ambrose Barnes (1627–1710), nonconformist and mayor
- Jonathan Barnes (born 1942), philosopher
- Julian Barnes (born 1946), novelist, Flaubert's Parrot
- William Barnes (1801–1886), dialect poet
- Correlli Barnett (1927–2022), historian
- Richard Barnfield (1574–1620), poet
- Alexander Baron (1917–1999), novelist and screenwriter
- Amelia Edith Huddleston Barr (1831–1919), novelist
- Geoffrey Barraclough (1908–1984), historian
- John Barret (1631–1713), writer and Presbyterian minister
- Joseph Barret (1665–1699), theological writer and merchant
- Leslie Barringer (1895–1968), editor and novelist
- Isaac Barrow (1630–1677), scholar and cleric
- John Barrow (fl. 1735–1774), lexicographer and historian
- William Barrow (1754–1836), writer and cleric
- Stan Barstow (1928–2011), novelist and dramatist
- William Bartholomew (1793–1867), librettist and composer
- Mike Bartlett (born 1980), playwright and director
- Bernard Barton (1784–1849), poet and Quaker
- Henry Howarth Bashford (1880–1961), novelist and physician
- William Basse (c. 1583–1653/1654), poet
- Jonathan Bate (born 1958), biographer and editor
- James Bateman (1811–1897), garden writer
- H. E. Bates (1905–1974), novelist, The Darling Buds of May
- Henry Walter Bates (1825–1892), naturalist and explorer
- Ralph Bates (1899–2000), novelist
- Elizabeth Bath (1772–1856), poet
- Richard Baxter (1615–1691), poet, hymnist and theologian
- Stephen Baxter (born 1957), novelist
- Basil Al Bayati (born 1946), writer and architect
- John Bayley (1925–2015), critic and novelist
- Peter Bayley (c. 1778–1883), poet and playwright
- Ada Ellen Bayly (wrote as Edna Lyall, 1857–1903), novelist
- Thomas Haynes Bayly (1797–1830), poet and playwright
- Martin Baynton (born 1953), children's writer and illustrator
- Jeremy John Beadle (1958–1995), critic
- John Beadle (died 1667), diarist and cleric
- Anne Beale (1816–1900), novelist and poet
- Richard Bean (born 1956), playwright
- Francis Beaumont (1584–1616), playwright
- John Beaumont (1583–1627), poet
- Joseph Beaumont (1616–1699), poet and cleric
- Aubrey Beardsley (1872–1898), writer and illustrator
- Laura Beatty (living), biographer and novelist
- Samuel Beazley (1786–1851), novelist, playwright and architect
- Peter Beckford (1740–1811), writer and landowner
- William Beckford (1760–1844), novelist and patron
- Lillian Beckwith (born Lillian Comber, 1916–2004), novelist
- Thomas Lovell Beddoes (1803–1849), poet
- William Bedwell (1561–1632), scholar, AV translator and cleric
- Henry Charles Beeching (1859–1919), poet and anthologist
- Patricia Beer (1919–1999), poet and critic
- Constance Beerbohm (1811–1892), writer
- Julius Beerbohm (1854–1906), travel writer and explorer
- Max Beerbohm (1872–1956), novelist and caricaturist, Zuleika Dobson
- Alfred Beesley (1800–1847), poet and topographer
- Mrs Beeton (born Isabella Mary Mayson, 1836–1865), cookery writer
- Antony Beevor (born 1946), historian and novelist
- Aphra Behn (1640–1689), novelist and playwright
- Daubridgecourt Belchier (1580–1621), dramatist
- Adrian Bell (1901–1980), countryside writer
- Clive Bell (1881–1964), art critic
- Florence Bell (1851–1930), playwright and editor
- Gertrude Bell (1868–1926), writer and traveller
- Josephine Bell (also as David Wintringham, 1897–1987), novelist
- Julian Bell (1908–1937), poet
- Mary Hayley Bell (1911–2005), novelist, playwright and actress
- Quentin Bell (1910–1996), critic and biographer
- Thomas Bell (1792–1880), zoologist and writer
- John Bellers (1654–1725), writer and Quaker
- Hilaire Belloc (1870–1953), writer and poet
- Thomas Belt (1832–1878), naturalist and geologist
- Elizabeth Benger (1775–1827), poet, novelist and biographer
- Edward Benlowes (1603–1676), poet
- Alan Bennett (born 1934), playwright and broadcaster
- Anna Maria Bennett (c. 1760–1808), novelist
- Arnold Bennett (1867–1931), novelist
- Edwin Keppel Bennett (wrote as Francis Bennett, 1887–1958), writer, poet and scholar
- Connie Bensley (born 1929), poet and playwright
- A. C. Benson (1862–1925), poet and diarist
- E. F. Benson (1867–1940), novelist and story writer
- Peter Benson (born 1956), novelist
- Robert Hugh Benson (1871–1914), novelist, writer and cleric
- Stella Benson (1892–1933), novelist, poet and travel writer
- George Bentham (1800–1884), botanist
- Jeremy Bentham (1748–1832), philosopher
- Edmund Clerihew Bentley (1875–1956), novelist, humorist and poet
- Elizabeth Bentley (1767–1839), poet
- Nicolas Bentley (1907–1978), writer and illustrator
- Phyllis Bentley (1894–1977), novelist and biographer
- Richard Bentley (1662–1742), theologian and poet
- Edward Berdoe (1836–1916), critic, novelist and physician
- Richard Berengarten (born 1943), poet
- Elisabeth Beresford (1928–2010), children's writer, the Wombles
- J. D. Beresford (1873–1947), novelist
- James Beresford (1764–1840), satirist, translator and cleric
- Leila Berg (1917–2012), children's writer
- John Berger (1926–2017), novelist, G.
- Reginald Berkeley (1890–1935), playwright and screenwriter
- John Berkenhout (1726–1791), naturalist
- Steven Berkoff (born 1937), playwright and actor
- William Bayle Bernard (1807–1875), playwright, critic and novelist
- John Bourchier Berners (1467–1533), translator and statesman
- Juliana Berners (Bernes, b. c. 1388), writer on heraldry, hawking etc., The Book of Saint Albans
- Elizabeth Berridge (1919–2009), English novelist
- Francis Berry (1915–2006), poet and critic
- Mary Berry (1763–1852), writer and editor
- Mary Berry (born 1935), cookery writer
- Lizzie Berry (1847-1919), poet
- Tess Berry-Hart (born 1978), playwright and novelist
- Charles Bertram (1723–1765), literary forger
- Annie Besant (1847–1933), writer and campaigner
- Walter Besant (1836–1901), novelist and historian
- Charles Best (1570–1627), poet
- Alfred Bestall (1892–1986), children's writer and illustrator, Rupert Bear
- Henry Digby Beste (1768–1836), religious writer
- Mary Matilda Betham (1776–1852), diarist and biographer
- Matilda Betham-Edwards (1836–1919), novelist, poet and travel writer
- Nicholas Bethell (1938–2007), writer, translator and politician
- John Betjeman (1906–1984), Poet Laureate and writer
- Thomas Betterton (1635–1710), playwright and actor
- Edwyn Bevan (1870–1943), philosopher and historian
- Elizabeth Beverley (fl. 1815–30), pamphleteer and actress
- L. S. Bevington (1845–1895), essayist, anarchist and poet
- Elizabeth Bibesco (1897–1945), novelist and poet
- Tessa Biddington (born 1954), poet
- Hester Biddle (c. 1629–1697), Quaker pamphleteer and preacher
- Elizabeth Biddulph, Baroness Biddulph (1834-1916), biographer and Woman of the Bedchamber to Queen Victoria
- John Stanyan Bigg (1828–1865), poet
- Mark Billingham (born 1961), novelist
- William Billington (1825–1884), poet
- Thomas Bilson(1547–1616), theologian, AV translator and bishop
- Andrew Bing (1574–1652), scholar, AV translator and cleric
- Margaret Bingham (1740–1814), poet and painter
- Laurence Binyon (1869–1943), poet and art historian
- T.J. Binyon (1936–2004), novelist, translator and biographer
- Carol Birch (born 1951), novelist and critic
- Thomas Birch (1705–1766), historian
- Caroline Bird (born 1986), poet and playwright
- Isabella Bird (1831–1904), travel writer and naturalist
- Dea Birkett (born 1958), writer
- John Birtwhistle (born 1946), poet and librettist
- Samuel Bishop (1731–1795), poet and essayist
- Clementina Black (1853–1922), novelist and political writer
- Robert Black (1829–1915), novelist, story writer and translator
- Sarah Blackborow (fl. 1650s – 1660s), Quaker writer and preacher
- John Blackburn (1923–1993), novelist
- Thomas Blackburn (1916–1977), poet
- Malorie Blackman (born 1962), children's writer and screenwriter
- R. D. Blackmore (1825–1900), novelist, Lorna Doone
- Richard Blackmore (1654–1729), poet and religious writer
- William Blackstone (1723–1780), legal writer
- Algernon Blackwood (1869–1951), novelist and story writer
- Caroline Blackwood (1931–1996), novelist and critic
- Helen Blackwood, Lady Dufferin (1807–1867), poet and songwriter
- Max Blagg (living), poet and writer
- Quentin Blake (born 1932), children's writer and illustrator
- William Blake (1757–1827), poet and artist, Songs of Innocence and of Experience
- Helen Blakeman (born 1971), playwright and screenwriter
- Susanna Blamire (1747–1794), poet
- Edward Blanchard (1820–1899), playwright and songwriter
- Samuel Laman Blanchard (1804–1845), writer, journalist and poet
- Robert Blatchford (wrote as Nunquam, 1851–1943), journalist, writer and campaigner
- Barbara Blaugdone (c. 1609–1705), Quaker autobiographer
- Nicholas Blincoe (born 1965), novelist and screenwriter
- Mathilde Blind (1841–1896), poet and biographer
- Edward Blishen (1920–1996), writer and broadcaster
- Eliot Bliss (Emily Bliss, 1903–1990), novelist and poet
- Walter Blith (1605–1654), writer on husbandry
- Robert Bloomfield (1766–1823), poet
- John Bloundelle-Burton (c. 1850–1917), journalist and novelist
- Charles Blount (1654–1693), polemicist
- Elizabeth Blower (c. 1757/1763 – post–1816), novelist, poet and actress
- Evelyn, Princess Blücher (1876–1960), diarist and memoirist
- Nicholas Blundell (1669–1737), diarist
- Edmund Blunden (1896–1974), poet, author and critic
- Anthony Blunt (1907–1983), art historian and spy
- Wilfrid Scawen Blunt (1840–1922), poet and author
- Ronald Blythe (1922–2023), writer and editor,
- Enid Blyton (1897–1968), children's writer, Noddy
- James Boaden (1762–1839), biographer, playwright and journalist
- Frederick S. Boas (1862–1957), literary historian
- John Ernest Bode (1816–1874), poet, hymnist and cleric
- John Bodenham (1569–1610), anthologist
- Barbara Bodichon (1827–1891), educator and feminist
- John Bois (1560–1643), scholar, AV translator and cleric
- Osbern Bokenam (c. 1393 – c. 1463), literary historian and cleric
- Robert Bolt (1924–1995), dramatist and screenwriter, A Man For All Seasons
- Sharon Bolton, mystery fiction writer
- Michael Bond (1926–2017), children's writer, Paddington Bear
- Elizabeth Bonhôte (1744–1818), novelist
- Christopher Booker (1937–2019), writer and journalist
- Luke Booker (1762–1835), poet, antiquary and cleric
- George Boole (1815–1864), mathematician and logician
- Mary Everest Boole (1832–1916), schoolbook writer
- Barton Booth (1681–1733), actor and poet
- Charles Booth (1840–1916), social researcher, Life and Labour of the People in London
- Martin Booth (1944–2004), novelist, poet and editor
- Stephen Booth (born 1952), novelist
- Brooke Boothby (1744–1824), scholar and poet
- Frances Boothby (fl. 1669–70), playwright
- Basil Boothroyd (1910–1988), writer and humorist
- George Borrow (1803–1881), novelist and travel writer, Romany Rye
- Lucy M. Boston (1892–1990), children's writer
- Clifford Edmund Bosworth (1928–2015), historian and Arabist
- Joseph Bosworth (1789–1876), lexicographer and Anglo-Saxon scholar
- Phyllis Bottome (1884–1963), novelist and psychoanalyst
- Gordon Bottomley (1874–1948), poet and dramatist
- Ronald Bottrall (1906–1989), poet and academic
- Marjorie Boulton (1924–2017), writer and Esperantist
- Francis William Bourdillon (1852–1921), poet
- Thomas Edward Bowdich (1791–1824), traveller and writer
- Henrietta Maria Bowdler ("Harriet", 1750–1830), religious writer and expurgator
- Jane Bowdler (1743–1784), poet and essayist
- John Bowdler (1746–1823), religious writer and pamphleteer
- John Bowdler (1783–1815), writer and poet
- Thomas Bowdler (1754–1825), writer and expurgator
- Thomas Bowdler 1782–1856), writer and cleric
- Elizabeth Bowen (1899–1973), novelist and story writer
- John Griffith Bowen (1924–2019), novelist and screenwriter
- Marjorie Bowen (real name Gabrielle Margaret Vere Long, 1885–1952), novelist and writer
- Emily Bowes (1806–1857), religious poet and artist
- Mary Bowes (1749–1800), playwright and botanist
- Tim Bowler (living), children's writer
- William Lisle Bowles (1762–1850), poet and critic
- Maurice Bowra (1898–1971), scholar and wit
- Frank Cottrell Boyce (born 1959), children's writer and screenwriter
- William Binnington Boyce (1804–1889), philologist and Methodist minister
- Abel Boyer (c. 1667–1729), journalist, miscellanist and translator
- Charles Boyle (1674–1731), writer and playwright
- Charles Boyle (born 1951), poet
- John Boyle (1707–1762), writer and translator
- Roger Boyle (1621–1679), playwright and statesman
- Charles Vernon Boys (1855–1944), physicist and polymath
- Ernest Franklin Bozman (1895–1968), writer and editor
- Michael Bracewell (born 1958), writer and novelist
- Alison Brackenbury (born 1953), poet
- Paula Brackston (living), genre novelist
- Jason Bradbury (living), children's writer and TV presenter
- Malcolm Bradbury (1932–2000), novelist
- Mary Elizabeth Braddon (1837–1915), novelist, Lady Audley's Secret
- Henry J. Bradfield (1805–1852), poet, writer and colonial officer
- Barbara Taylor Bradford (1933–2024), novelist
- Ernle Bradford (1922–1986), historian and writer
- Walter Bradick (1706-1794)
- Charles Bradlaugh (1833–1891), writer and freethinker
- A. C. Bradley (1851–1935), literary critic
- Charles Bradley (1789–1871), writer and preacher
- Edward Bradley (wrote as Cuthbert M. Bede, BA, 1827–1889), novelist and cleric
- F. H. Bradley (1846–1924), philosopher
- Henry Bradley (1845–1923), philologist and lexicographer
- Henry Bradshaw (c. 1450–1513), poet and monk
- Nicholas Bradshawe (c. 1635), writer
- Hilary Bradt (born 1941), travel writer and publisher
- John Brady (died 1814), miscellanist
- Melvyn Bragg (born 1939), novelist, biographer and broadcaster
- John Braine (1922–1986), novelist, Room at the Top
- Richard Braithwaite or Brathwait, (1588–1673), poet
- Ernest Bramah (born Ernest Bramah Smith, 1868–1942), novelist and humorist
- James Bramston (1694–1744), poet and satirist
- Barbarina Brand Lady Dacre, (1768–1854), poet, playwright and translator
- Christianna Brand (real name Mary Christianna Milne, 1907–1988), novelist and children's writer
- Hannah Brand (1754–1821), playwright, poet and actress
- Jo Brand (born 1957), writer and comedian
- William Branthwaite (died 1620), scholar, AV translator and cleric
- Anna Brassey (1839–1887), travel writer
- Anna Eliza Bray (1790–1883), novelist and topographer
- Charles Bray (1811–1884), philosopher and phrenologist
- Angela Brazil (1868–1947), novelist
- Wallace Breem (1926–1990), novelist and librarian
- John Brent (1808–1882), novelist and antiquary
- Elinor Brent-Dyer (1894–1969), children's writer, Chalet School
- Frederick Sadleir Brereton (1852–1957), writer for boys
- John Brereton (1571 or 1572 – c. 1632), travel writer and explorer
- Nicholas Breton (c. 1545–1626), poet and tractarian
- Richard Brett (1567–1637), scholar, AV translator and cleric
- Simon Brett (born 1945), novelist and playwright
- E. Cobham Brewer (1810–1897), writer and cleric, Brewer's Dictionary of Phrase and Fable
- George Brewer (1766–18??), miscellanist
- James Norris Brewer (fl. 1799–1829), topographer and novelist
- John Brewster (1753–1842), writer and cleric
- Shane Briant (1946–2021), novelist and actor
- John Bridges (1536–1618), tractarian and bishop
- Robert Bridges (1844–1930), Poet Laureate
- Victor Bridges (1878–1972), novelist and playwright
- Katharine Mary Briggs (1898–1980), folklore writer
- Raymond Briggs (1934–2022), children's writer and illustrator
- John Bright (1811–1889), orator and politician
- Joanna Briscoe (born 1963), novelist and journalist
- Sophia Briscoe (fl. 1770s), novelist
- Vera Brittain (1893–1970), writer and pacifist
- Edwin Brock (1927–1997), poet
- William Brock (1807–1875), biographer and Baptist minister
- Alexander Brome (1620–1666), poet
- Richard Brome (c. 1590 – c. 1653), playwright
- Vincent Brome (1910–2004), biographer and novelist
- Eliza Bromley (fl. 1784–1803), novelist and translator
- Eleanor Bron (born 1938), writer and actress
- Anne Brontë (1820–1849), novelist, The Tenant of Wildfell Hall
- Charlotte Brontë (1816–1855), novelist, Jane Eyre
- Emily Brontë (1818–1848), novelist and poet, Wuthering Heights
- Patrick Brontë (originally Brunty, 1777–1861), poet, writer and cleric
- Rhidian Brook (born 1964), novelist and screenwriter
- Arthur de Capell Brooke (1791–1858), travel writer
- Christopher N. L. Brooke (living), historian
- Frances Brooke (1724–1789), novelist and playwright
- Jocelyn Brooke (1908–1966), novelist, poet and biographer
- John Brooke (died 1582), religious writer and translator
- Rupert Brooke (1887–1915), poet
- Anita Brookner (1928–2016), novelist
- Kevin Brooks (born 1959), children's writer
- Shirley Brooks (1816–1874), novelist, playwright and poet
- Ralph Broome (1742–1835), pamphleteer and poet
- William Broome (1689–1745), poet and translator
- Robert Barnabas Brough (1828–1864), writer and poet
- George Brown (1835–1917), ethnographer and diarist
- John Brown (1715–1766), essayist and cleric
- Pamela Brown (1924–1989), children's writer
- Pete Brown (1940–2023), performance poet and songwriter
- Pete Brown (born 1968), beer writer and columnist
- Stewart Brown (born 1951), poet and scholar
- Tom Brown (1663–1704), satirist and translator
- Anthony Browne (born 1946), children's writer and illustrator
- Edward Browne (1862–1926), orientalist and writer
- Isaac Hawkins Browne (1705–1760), poet
- Moses Browne (1704–1787), poet and cleric
- Thomas Browne (1705–1782), polymath, Religio Medici
- William Browne (c. 1590 – c. 1645), poet
- Elizabeth Barrett Browning (1806–1861), poet
- Oscar Browning (1837–1923), writer and scholar
- Robert Browning (1812–1889), poet
- Alan Brownjohn (1931–2024), poet and novelist
- Dorita Fairlie Bruce (1885–1970), children's writer
- Henry James Bruce (1880–1951), autobiographer and diplomat
- Francis Bryan (c. 1490–1550), poet and courtier
- Arthur Bryant (1899–1985), historian
- Samuel Egerton Brydges (1762–1836), bibliographer and editor
- Bryher (real name Annie Winifred Ellerman, 1894–1983), novelist, poet and memoirist
- Charles Bucke (1781–1846), writer and poet
- Anthony Buckeridge (1912–2004), children's writer, Jennings
- James Silk Buckingham (1786–1855), journalist and travel writer
- Leicester Silk Buckingham (1825–1867), playwright and historian
- Francis Trevelyan Buckland (1826–1880), natural historian
- Raymond Buckland (1934–2017), occultist
- William Buckland (1784–1856), geologist, palaeontologist and cleric
- Henry Thomas Buckle (1821–1862), historian
- Catherine Mary Buckton (1826-1904), campaigner and writer
- Maria Elizabeth Budden (c. 1780–1832), children's writer
- Eustace Budgell (1686–1737), writer and politician
- Frank Thomas Bullen (1857–1915), novelist and autobiographer
- A. H. Bullen (1857–1920), scholar
- J. B. Bullen (living), critic
- Gerald Bullett (1893–1958), novelist, critic and poet
- Edward Bulwer-Lytton (1803–1873), novelist, poet and playwright
- Robert Bulwer-Lytton (wrote as Owen Meredith, 1831–1891), poet
- Basil Bunting (1900–1985), poet
- John Bunyan (1628–1688), writer, The Pilgrim's Progress
- Josiah Burchett (c. 1666–1746), naval historian
- George Burges (1786–1864), classicist
- Anthony Burgess (originally John Burgess Wilson, 1917–1993), novelist, A Clockwork Orange
- Melvin Burgess (born 1954), children's writer
- John William Burgon (1813–1888), poet and theologian
- John Burgoyne (1722–1792), playwright and army officer
- Thomas Burke (1886–1945), novelist and writer
- William Burke (died 1798), pamphleteer and official
- Francis Burleigh (fl. 1590–1610), AV translator and cleric
- Michael Burleigh (born 1955), historian
- Andrew Burnaby (1732–1812), travel writer and cleric
- Francis Burnand (1836–1917), humorist and dramatist
- Thomas Burnet (c. 1635–1715), theologian
- Frances Hodgson Burnett (1849–1924), children's writer, The Secret Garden
- Caroline Burney (fl. early 19th century), novelist
- Charles Burney (1726–1814), music scholar and composer
- Charles Burney (1757–1817), scholar, educator and cleric
- Fanny Burney (also as Frances, Mme d'Arblay, 1752–1840), novelist and diarist, Evelina
- Frances Burney (1776–1828), dramatist
- James Burney (1750–1821), travel writer and admiral
- Sarah Burney (1772–1844), novelist
- Myles Burnyeat (1939–2019), philosopher and classicist
- James Burr (born 1971), fiction writer
- Sophia Burrell (1753–1802), poet and playwright
- James Burrow (1701–1782), scholar, scientist and lawyer
- Montagu Burrows (1819–1905), naval historian and officer
- Hester Burton (1913–2000), historical novelist and children's writer
- Maurice Burton (1898–1992), science writer and zoologist
- Richard Francis Burton (1821–1890), writer, translator and explorer
- Robert Burton (1577–1640), polymath, The Anatomy of Melancholy
- Charlotte Bury (1775–1861), novelist and poet
- Elizabeth Bury (1644–1720), diarist and polymath
- Alban Butler (1710–1773), writer and cleric
- Catherine Butler (earlier Charles Butler, born 1963), children's writer and academic
- Gwendoline Butler (1922–2013), novelist
- Joseph Butler (1692–1752), theologian and bishop
- Josephine Butler (1828–1906), writer and campaigner
- Samuel Butler (1612–1680), poet and satirist, Hudibras
- Samuel Butler (1835–1902), writer and satirist, Erewhon
- Herbert Butterfield (1900–1979), historian
- Jez Butterworth (born 1969), playwright
- Mary Butts (1890–1937), writer and poet
- Bertha Henry Buxton (1844–1881), novelist and children's writer
- Nigel Buxton (1924–2015), travel writer and wine critic
- Thomas Buxton (1786–1845), political writer
- A. S. Byatt (1936–2023), novelist
- John Byrom (1692–1763), poet
- John Byron (1723–1786), memoirist and admiral
- Lord Byron (1788–1824), poet, Don Juan
- Robert Byron (1905–1941), travel writer
- Ingram Bywater (1840–1914), scholar and editor
- Michael Bywater (born 1953), writer and broadcaster

== C ==
- Florence Caddy (1837–1923), writer
- Hall Caine (1853–1931), novelist and playwright
- Mona Caird (1854–1932), essayist, novelist and feminist
- John Caius the Elder or Kay (fl. 1480), narrative poet
- Maria Callcott (1785–1842), children's writer, travel writer, and illustrator
- Brian Callison (1934–2024), novelist
- Charles Stuart Calverley (1831–1884), poet and translator
- Roland Camberton (real name Henry Cohen, 1921–1965), novelist
- Ada Cambridge (1844–1926), novelist and poet
- William Camden (1551–1623), historian and antiquary
- Richard Cameron (living), playwright
- Thomas Campion (1567–1620), poet and composer
- Bruce Campbell (1912–1993), ornithologist
- W. H. Canaway (1925–1988), novelist
- James Cancellar, (fl. 1564), English theological writer
- Hugh Candidus (c. 1095 – c. 1160), historian in Latin and monk
- Denis Cannan (1919–2011), playwright and screenwriter
- Gilbert Cannan (1884–1955), novelist and translator
- Joanna Cannan (1898–1961), novelist and children's writer
- May Wedderburn Cannan (1893–1973), poet and autobiographer
- Dorothy Cannell (born 1943), novelist
- Victor Canning (1911–1986), novelist, essayist and children's writer
- William Canton (1845–1926), poet and children's writer
- Edward Capell (1713–1781), Shakespearean
- Edward Capern (1819–1894), poet and postman
- John Capgrave (1393–1464), theologian and historian
- Neville Cardus (1888–1975), cricket writer and music critic
- Thomas Carew (1595–1640), poet
- Henry Carey (1687–1743), poet, playwright and song-writer
- Mary Carey, Lady Carey (c. 1609 – c. 1680), poet
- Rosa Nouchette Carey (1840–1909), novelist and children's writer
- Robert Carliell (died c. 1622), poet
- Harry Carmichael (real name Leopold Horace Ognall (1908–1979), also known as Hartley Howard), crime novelist
- John Carne (1789–1844), travel writer and biographer
- Edward Carpenter (1844–1929), poet and philosopher
- Humphrey Carpenter (1946–2005), biographer, broadcaster and children's writer
- Barbara Comyns Carr (1907–1992), novelist and artist
- J. L. Carr (1912–1994), novelist and schoolbook writer
- Lewis Carroll (real name Charles Lutwidge Dodgson, 1832–1898), children's writer and mathematician, Alice's Adventures in Wonderland
- Angela Carter (1940–1992), novelist
- Elizabeth Carter (1717–1806), poet, translator and bluestocking
- Barbara Cartland (1901–2000), novelist
- George Cartwright (1739–1819), diarist and explorer
- Justin Cartwright (1945–2018), novelist
- William Cartwright (1611–1643), playwright
- Elizabeth Cary (1585–1639), poet and playwright, The Tragedy of Mariam
- Henry Francis Cary (1772–1844), translator and critic
- Lucius Cary (Lord Falkland, 1610–1643), poet, writer and politician
- Patrick Cary or Carey, (c. 1624–1658), poet
- John Caryll (1625–1711), poet, playwright and diplomat
- Juanita Casey (1925–2012), poet and novelist
- Cathy Cassidy (born 1962), children's writer
- Egerton Castle (1858–1920), novelist (with wife Agnes)
- Helen Castor (living), historian and broadcaster
- Sarah Caudwell (real name Sarah Cockburn, 1939–2000), novelist
- Charles Causley (1917–2003), poet and editor
- David Caute (born 1936), novelist and historian
- Tiberius Cavallo (1749–1809), natural philosopher
- George Cavendish (1494 – c. 1652), biographer and poet
- Jane Cavendish (later Jane Cheyne, 1621–1669), poet and playwright
- Margaret Cavendish Duchess of Newcastle, (1623–1673), poet, novelist and playwright
- William Cavendish (1592–1676), polymath
- William Caxton (c. 1415/1422 – c. 1492), printer and translator
- Lord David Cecil (1902–1986), scholar and biographer
- Dorothea Celesia (originally Mallet, 1738–1790), poet and translator
- Susanna Centlivre (also as Susanna Carroll, c. 1667–1723), playwright, poet and actress
- Mark Chadbourn (born 1960), genre novelist
- Laurence Chaderton (c. 1536–1640), theologian, AV translator and cleric
- Charles Chadwick (1932–2025), novelist
- Henry Chadwick (1920–2008), theologian, historian and cleric
- John Chalkhill (fl. c. 1600), poet
- Annie Emma Challice (1821–1875), author
- Thomas Chaloner (1521–1565), poet, translator and statesman
- Edward Chamberlayne (1616–1703), writer, historian and translator
- William Chamberlayne (1619–1689), poet
- Shaun Chamberlin (living), author and activist
- Aidan Chambers (1934–2025), children's writer
- Ephraim Chambers (c. 1680–1740), writer and encyclopedist
- Frederick Chamier (1796–1870), novelist and sea captain
- Meira Chand (living), novelist
- Mary Chandler (1687–1745), poet
- Raymond Chandler (1888–1959), crime writer
- Samuel Chandler (1693–1766), theologian and Presbyterian minister
- Henry Channon ("Chips", 1897–1958), writer and diarist
- George Chapman (1559–1634), poet, playwright and translator
- Guy Chapman (1889–1972), writer and historian
- Pat Chapman (1940–2022), food writer
- Hester Chapone (1727–1801), writer and bluestocking
- Charlotte Charke (originally Cibber, 1713–1760), writer and actress
- Elizabeth Charles (1828–1896), novelist and religious writer
- Gerda Charles (real name Edna Lipson, 1914–1996), novelist and anthologist
- Maria Louisa Charlesworth (1819–1880), children's writer
- Leslie Charteris (born Leslie Charles Bowyer-Yin, 1907–1993), novelist, Simon Templar
- James Hadley Chase, b. Rene Brabazon Raymond, also as James L. Docherty, Ambrose Grant, etc., (1906–1985), novelist
- Debjani Chatterjee (born 1952), poet, translator and children's writer
- Georgiana Chatterton (1806–1876), travel writer, novelist and poet
- Thomas Chatterton (wrote as Thomas Rowley, 1752–1770), poet
- Beth Chatto (1923–2018), garden writer
- William Andrew Chatto (also as Stephen Oliver, 1799–1864), travel and general writer
- Bruce Chatwin (1940–1989), novelist and travel writer
- Geoffrey Chaucer (c. 1343–1400), poet, The Canterbury Tales
- Mavis Cheek (living), novelist
- John Cheke (1514–1557), classicist and translator
- George Tomkyns Chesney (1830–1895), novelist and army officer
- G. K. Chesterton (1874–1936), novelist, poet and essayist, Father Brown
- Henry Chettle (c. 1564 – c. 1607), playwright
- William Rufus Chetwood (died 1766), playwright, novelist and publisher
- Peter Cheyney (1896–1951), novelist
- Josiah Child (1630–1699), political economist and merchant
- Lee Child (real name Jim Grant, b. 1954), thriller writer
- Wilfred Rowland Childe (1890–1952), poet
- Erskine Childers (1870–1922), novelist and politician
- William Chillingworth (1602–1644), religious writer
- Mary Cholmondeley (1859–1925), novelist
- Charles Chorley (c. 1810–1874), man of letters
- Agatha Christie (1891–1976), mystery writer
- Mary Chudleigh (1656–1710), poet and polemicist
- Alfred John Church (1829–1912), scholar, poet and translator
- Richard Church (1893–1972), poet
- Richard William Church (1815–1890), biographer, historian and cleric
- Caryl Churchill (born 1938), playwright and translator
- Charles Churchill (1731–1764), poet and satirist
- Winston Churchill (1874–1965), writer, prime minister and Nobel Prize winner
- Thomas Churchyard (c. 1520–1604), poet and soldier
- Colley Cibber (1671–1757), Poet Laureate, playwright and bowdlerizer
- Horatio Clare (born 1973), writer
- John Clare (1793–1864), poet
- Emily Clark (fl. 1798–1819), novelist and poet
- Amy Clarke (1892–1980), poet and school historian
- Arthur C. Clarke (1917–2008), SF novelist
- Bob Clarke (born 1964), archaeologist and historian
- Charles Cowden Clarke (1787–1877), writer and scholar
- Mrs. Henry Clarke (Amy, 1853–1908), historical novelist and children's writer
- Jane Clarke, biochemist and academic
- Jane E. Clarke (born 1954), children's writer
- Lindsay Clarke (born 1939), novelist and poet
- Mary Cowden Clarke (originally Novello, 1809–1898), writer and scholar
- Pauline Clarke (1921–2013), children's writer
- Richard Clarke (died 1634), scholar, AV translator and cleric
- Roy Clarke (born 1930), screenwriter and playwright
- Samuel Clarke (1675–1729), philosopher and cleric
- Susanna Clarke (born 1959), novelist, Jonathan Strange & Mr Norrell
- T. E. B. Clarke (1907–1989), screenwriter and novelist
- Laurence Clarkson or Claxton (1615–1667), writer and theologian
- John Clavell (1601–1643), writer, playwright and highwayman
- Chris Cleave (born 1973), novelist and journalist
- Brian Cleeve (1921–2003), novelist
- Lucas Cleeve (also as Mrs Howard Kingscote, 1868–1908), novelist
- John Cleland (1709–1789), novelist, Fanny Hill
- Dick Clement (born 1937), scriptwriter
- Jack Clemo (1916–1994), poet and novelist
- John Cleveland (1613–1658), poet
- Barbara Cleverly (born 1940), novelist
- Anne Clifford (1590–1676), diarist
- Lucy Clifford (wrote as Mrs. W. K. Clifford, 1846–1929), novelist, playwright and children's writer
- William Kingdon Clifford (1846–1879), philosopher and children's writer
- Caroline Clive (wrote as "V", 1801–1872), novelist and poet
- John Clive (1933–2012), novelist and actor
- Kitty Clive (born Catherine Raftor, 1711–1785), playwright and actress
- Arthur Hugh Clough (1819–1861), poet
- Bryan Clough (born 1932), writer
- William Cobbett (1763–1835), writer and pamphleteer, Rural Rides
- Bob Cobbing (1920–2002), poet and artist
- Richard Cobbold (1797–1877), novelist and writer
- Ellen Melicent Cobden (1848–1914), novelist and poet
- Richard Cobden (1804–1865), pamphleteer
- Aston Cockayne (1605–1684), poet and playwright
- Catherine Trotter Cockburn (1679–1749), novelist and playwright
- Edward Cocker (1631–1676), writer and engraver
- Richard Cocks (1566–1624), diarist
- Henry Cockton (1807–1853), novelist
- Jonathan Coe (born 1961), novelist
- Lady Mary Coke (1727–1811), correspondent and diarist
- Barry Cole (1936–2014), poet and novelist
- G. D. H. Cole (1889–1959), economist, historian and novelist
- Margaret Cole (1893–1980), politician and novelist
- Olivia Cole (born 1982), poet
- John William Colenso (1814–1883), writer and bishop
- Christabel Rose Coleridge (1843–1921), novelist and editor
- Derwent Coleridge (1800–1883), writer, scholar and cleric
- Ernest Hartley Coleridge (1846–1920), critic, editor and poet
- Hartley Coleridge (1796–1849), poet and critic
- Mary Elizabeth Coleridge (1861–1907), novelist and poet
- Samuel Taylor Coleridge (1772–1834), poet, "The Rime of the Ancient Mariner"
- Sara Coleridge (1802–1852), author and translator
- Stephen Coleridge (1854–1936), writer, poet and campaigner
- Jane Collier (1714–1755), satirist
- Jeremy Collier (1650–1726), pamphleteer and cleric
- John Collier (wrote as Tim Bobbin, 1708–1786), dialect poet and caricaturist
- John Collier (1901–1980), story writer and screenwriter
- John Payne Collier (1789–1883), literary critic, editor and forger
- Mary Collier (c. 1688–1762), poet
- R. G. Collingwood (1889–1943), philosopher and historian
- W. G. Collingwood (1854–1932), writer and artist
- An Collins (fl. 1653), religious poet
- Anthony Collins (1676–1729), philosopher
- Charles James Collins (1820–1864), novelist and journalist
- Jackie Collins (1937–2015), novelist
- John Collins (1625–1683), mathematician
- John Collins (1742–1808), poet and lyricist
- John Churton Collins (1848–1908), literary critic
- Mortimer Collins (1827–1876), novelist and poet
- Norman Collins (1907–1982), novelist
- Warwick Collins (1948–2013), novelist and screenwriter
- Wilkie Collins (1824–1889), novelist, The Moonstone
- William Collins (1721–1759), poet
- John Stewart Collis (1900–1984), biographer and countryside writer
- Maurice Collis (1889–1973), writer and biographer
- Mary Collyer (c. 1716–1762), translator and novelist.
- George Colman (1732–1794), playwright
- George Colman (1762–1836), playwright and poet
- Jock Colville (1915–1987), diarist and civil servant
- Howard Colvin (1919–2007), architectural historian
- William Combe (1741–1823), miscellanist and poet
- Alex Comfort (1920–2000), novelist, poet and writer
- Jack Common (1903–1968), novelist
- Ivy Compton-Burnett (1884–1969), novelist
- William Congreve (1670–1729), playwright and poet, Erewhon
- Thomas Coningsby (died 1625), diarist, soldier and politician
- Paul Conneally (born 1959), poet, artist and musician
- Charlie Connelly (born 1970), football and travel writer
- Cyril Connolly (1903–1974), writer and critic
- Joseph Connolly (born 1950), writer and novelist
- Tony Connor (born 1930), poet and playwright
- Robert Conquest (1917–2015), historian and poet
- Henry Constable (1562–1613), poet
- Hugh Conway (real name Frederick John Fargus, 1847–1885), novelist
- Robert Seymour Conway (1864–1933), classicist
- John Conybeare (1692–1755), theologian and bishop
- John Josias Conybeare (1779–1824), scholar, translator and cleric
- William Daniel Conybeare (1787–1857), writer and cleric
- William John Conybeare (1815–1857), writer, novelist and cleric
- David Cook (1940–2015), novelist and screenwriter
- Edward Dutton Cook (1829–1883), novelist and critic
- Eliza Cook (1818–1889), poet
- James Cook (1728–1779), travel writer and mariner
- Judith Cook (1933–2004), novelist
- Dorian Cooke (1916–2005), poet and intelligence officer
- Thomas Cooke (1703–1756), poet, playwright and translator
- Catherine Cookson (1906–1998), novelist
- William Henry Coombes (1767–1850), writer and RC priest
- Artemis Cooper (born 1953), writer and editor
- Duff Cooper (1890–1954), writer, diarist and politician
- Jilly Cooper (1937–2025), writer and novelist
- Lettice Cooper (1897–1994), novelist and critic
- Thomas Cooper (1805–1892), poet and novelist
- William Cooper (real name H. S. Hoff, 1910–2002), novelist
- Isabel Cooper-Oakley (1853/1854–1914), theosophist
- Wendy Cope (born 1945), poet
- Esther Copley (1786–1851) children's and housekeeping writer
- A. E. Coppard (1878–1957) poet and story writer
- Abiezer Coppe (1619–1672) religious writer
- Richard Corbet or Corbett (1582–1635), poet and bishop
- Jim Corbett (1875–1955), writer and conservationist
- Julian Corbett (1854–1922), naval historian
- Michael Cordy (living), novelist
- Marie Corelli (1855–1924), novelist
- Alan Coren (1938–2007), writer, satirist and broadcaster
- Hilary Corke (1921–2001), poet
- Adam Cornford (born 1950), poet and essayist
- Frances Cornford (1886–1960), poet
- Francis M. Cornford (1874–1943), scholar and poet
- John Cornford (1915–1936), poet
- Caroline Cornwallis (1786–1858), writer and polyglot
- Jane Cornwallis (1581–1659), correspondent
- Bernard Cornwell (born 1944), novelist
- William Cornysh or Cornish (1465–1523), dramatist, poet and composer
- Felicitas Corrigan (1908–2003), writer and nun
- Annie Sophie Cory (wrote as Victoria Cross, 1868–1952), novelist
- William Johnson Cory (1823–1892), poet and educator
- Thomas Coryat or Coryate (c. 1577–1617), travel writer and poet
- Louisa Stuart Costello (1799–1870), travel writer, novelist and poet
- John Cosin (1594–1672), polemicist and bishop
- Randle Cotgrave (died 1634 or 1652), lexicographer
- Joseph Cottle (1770–1853), poet and essayist
- Colin Cotterill (born 1952), author and cartoonist
- Charles Cotton (1630–1687), poet and writer
- Robert Bruce Cotton (1570/1571 – 1631), antiquary and political writer
- Oswald Couldrey (1882–1958), poet and artist
- Stephen Coulter (also as James Mayo, 1914–1986), novelist
- G. G. Coulton (1858–1947), historian and polemicist
- William John Courthope (1842–1917), critic and poet
- Polly Courtney (living), novelist
- Francis Coventry (1725–1754 or 1759), novelist
- Miles Coverdale (c. 1488–1569), Bible translator
- Noël Coward (1899–1973), playwright, Blithe Spirit
- Abraham Cowley (1618–1667), poet
- Hannah Cowley (1743–1809), playwright
- Dorothy Cowlin (1911–2010), novelist and poet
- E. E. Cowper (1859–1933), novelist
- Frank Cowper (1849–1930), yachtsman and author
- William Cowper (1731–1800), poet, John Gilpin
- Anthony Berkeley Cox (also as Anthony Berkeley, etc., 1893–1971), novelist
- Edward Coxere (1633–1694), autobiographer and seaman
- George Crabbe (1754–1832), poet and naturalist
- Jim Crace (born 1946), novelist
- Hubert Crackanthorpe (originally Cookson, 1870–1896), essayist and story writer
- Nicholas Crafts (1949–2023), economic historian
- Albert Craig (the Surrey Poet, 1849–1909), sports poet
- Amanda Craig (born 1959), novelist
- Dinah Craik (also as Miss Mulock, 1826–1887), novelist and poet
- Edward Crankshaw (1909–1984), writer, historian and translator
- Richard Crashaw (1613–1649), poet
- Elizabeth Craven (1750–1828), travel writer and playwright
- John Creasey (1908–1973), novelist
- Edward Shepherd Creasy (1812–1878), historian
- Thomas Creech (1659–1700), translator
- Thomas Creevey (1768–1838), diarist and politician
- Mandell Creighton (1843–1901), historian and bishop
- Helen Cresswell (1934–2005), children's writer and screenwriter
- Jasmine Cresswell (born 1941), novelist
- Nicholas Cresswell (1750–1804), diarist and farmer
- Bernard Crick (1929–2008), political scientist
- Martin Crimp (born 1956), playwright
- Arthur Shearly Cripps (1869–1952), story writer and poet
- Quentin Crisp (born Denis Charles Pratt, 1908–1999), writer and raconteur
- Ann Batten Cristall (1769–1848), poet
- Herbert Croft (1751–1815), novelist
- Rupert Croft-Cooke (wrote as Leo Bruce, 1903–1979), novelist
- Andrew Crofts (born 1953), ghost writer
- Bithia Mary Croker (1849–1920), novelist
- Thomas Francis Dillon Croker (wrote as T. F. Dillon Croker, 1831–1912), antiquary and poet
- Richmal Crompton (real name Richmal Crompton Lamburn, 1890–1969), novelist, Just William
- Vincent Cronin (1924–2011), historian and biographer
- Camilla Dufour Crosland (1812–1895), poet, novelist and historical writer
- A. F. Cross (1863–1940), poet, playwright and journalist
- Gillian Cross (born 1945), children's writer
- Kevin Crossley-Holland (born 1941), children's writer, poet and editor
- Catherine Crowe (1790–1872), novelist and playwright
- William Crowe (1745–1829), poet
- Aleister Crowley (1875–1947), writer, mystic and occultist
- John Crowne (1641–1712), playwright
- Andrew Crozier (1943–2008), poet and scholar
- Andrew Crumey (born 1961), novelist
- Barry Cryer (1935–2022), writer
- J. A. Cuddon (1928–1996), novelist, playwright and lexicographer
- Annie Hall Cudlip (1838–1918), novelist
- Pender Hodge Cudlip (1834–1911), writer and cleric
- John Cullum (1733–1785), antiquary, historian and cleric
- Hannah Cullwick (1833–1909), diarist and servant
- Nathaniel Culverwell (1619–1651), philosopher and theologian
- Richard Cumberland (1631–1718), philosopher and bishop
- Richard Cumberland (1732–1811), playwright, poet and novelist
- Nancy Cunard (1896–1965), poet and memoirist
- Joseph Cundall (wrote as Stephen Percy, 1818–1895), children's writer and publisher
- John Cunliffe (1933–2018), children's writer
- Roland Curram (1932–2025), novelist and actor
- R. N. Currey (1907–2001), poet
- Lionel George Curtis (1872–1955), writer on world government
- William Curtis (1746–1799), botanist
- Alice Curwen (c. 1619–1679), Quaker writer and preacher
- Henry Cust (1861–1917), writer and editor
- Catherine Cuthbertson (pre–1780 – post–1830), novelist
- Judith Cutler (born 1946), novelist
- John Cutts (1661–1707), poet, writer and soldier
