= AW1 =

AW1 may refer to:

- Nikon 1 AW1, mirrorless interchangeable lens camera
- Volkswagen Polo Mk6 AW1, a supermini car
- International Harvester AW1, a transport truck; see List of International Harvester vehicles
- USS Stag (AW-1), WW2 U.S. Navy water distilling ship
- Avon Wheatbelt P1 (AW1), Wheatbelt (Western Australia), Australia

== See also ==
- AW (disambiguation)
- AWI (disambiguation)
- Awl (disambiguation)
