= A. W. (poet) =

Anonymous poet

The anonymous poet A.W. is responsible for the long poem "Complaint", printed in A Poetical Rapsody, a volume issued in 1602 by two brothers, Francis and Walter Davison. In the Rapsody the poem is ascribed to Francis Davison, but in Davison's own manuscript, to "A. W.". Not only the eight rhyme-endings, but the actual words that compose them, are the same in each of eight stanzas, a virtuoso display.

The mysterious "A.W." has never been identified but the songs of "A.W." found places in many anthologies and song-books of the early seventeenth century.
