= Charles Best (poet) =

English poet

Charles Best (fl. 1592–1611) was an English poet and lawyer of the Elizabethan and Jacobean periods. The dates of his birth and death are not recorded, but his father and mother, John Best and Margaret Walcot of Cotheridge, Worcestershire, were married in 1567, and Charles was admitted to the Middle Temple on 22 April 1592. He is known today for his contributions to A Poetical Rhapsody, a poetic miscellany compiled by Francis Davison and first published in 1602. The first edition contained two sonnets by Best, A Sonnet of the Sun and A Sonnet of the Moon; the third edition of 1611 added eight further poems, including epitaphs and panegyrics for Elizabeth I, James I, and Henry IV of France, and two translations of Latin verses on the fall and salvation of man from the De contemptu mundi of John of Garland.

The two sonnets, and especially A Sonnet of the Moon, have been admired by modern readers and frequently anthologized. A. H. Bullen, who produced an edition of A Poetical Rhapsody in 1892 and wrote the brief entry on Best in the Dictionary of National Biography, described the sonnets as "graceful pieces, [which] make us regret that the author wrote so little"; and Walter de la Mare praised the "directness and economy of statement" in A Sonnet of the Moon, and the "spontaneous felicity" with which the simple prosaic rhythms of the words are woven into the metrical scheme.
