= William Davison (diplomat) =

English diplomat and secretary to Queen Elizabeth I

William Davison (c. 1541 – 21 December 1608) was an English diplomat and secretary to Queen Elizabeth I. As a Secretary of some influence, he was active in forging alliances with England's Protestant friends in Holland and Scotland to prevent war with France. He was involved in the 1587 execution of Mary, Queen of Scots, and was made a scapegoat for this event.

== Diplomacy ==
According to James Melville of Halhill, Davison claimed to be of Scottish descent. He first visited Scotland acting as secretary to Henry Killigrew, according to an early biographer, in June 1566 when Mary Stuart gave birth to her son in Edinburgh Castle. Davison more certainly came to Edinburgh with Killigrew in 1574 and 1575. Davison was a member of the English Privy Council's Puritan group around Robert Dudley, Earl of Leicester and Francis Walsingham, Elizabeth's principal secretary and spymaster.

Between 1576 and 1577, Davison was sent on at least three separate missions to France to attempt to broker peace and prevent war with England. He perceived the Spanish Governor of the Netherlands to be cruel and vengeful. He wrote to his patron Leicester many times, strongly urging an alliance with the Prince of Orange to stop a Catholic alliance forming for an invasion of England. As his influence slipped away, Davison complained of ill-health and the cost of his embassy. In May 1579 he returned to England. (Note: The State Papers require this to be May, but Nicolas' biography finds it was April.) He was granted, by the Queen herself, the reversion of the Clerk of Treasury's office on 16 January 1578, to which he eventually succeeded years later.

=== Scotland in 1583 and 1584 ===
In December 1582, he was sent to Scotland by Elizabeth I to join the ambassador Robert Bowes at the court of King James VI. At this time, the rival French diplomatic mission of Bertrand de Salignac de la Mothe-Fénelon and François de Rocherolles, Sieur de Mainville, was sent to Edinburgh. Walsingham heard that the French diplomats were trying to negotiate a marriage between James VI and Christina of Lorraine, a daughter of Charles III, Duke of Lorraine.

Davison travelled from London with Mothe-Fénelon and, by chance, met the Esmé Stewart, Duke of Lennox at Topcliffe in Yorkshire. Alexander Hume of Hutton Hall was sent to meet both groups of diplomats at the border at Berwick-upon-Tweed and escort them to Edinburgh on 6 January. The met Lord Home at Dunglass and stayed a night at Dunbar. After both diplomats had audiences with James VI, Robert Bowes wrote to Walsingham that it was as yet unclear if Mothe-Fénelon's main task was to advance plans for James's marriage. On 19 January, Bowes and Davison wrote a joint letter to Walsingham detailing what they knew of Mothe-Fénelon's negotiations. He had vaguely referred to the king's marriage by the example of his grandfather James V "who came to France to chose a wife".

Davison described his proceedings and discoveries in a letter to Christopher Hatton on 22 January 1583. He wrote that Mainville's entourage included Dormes, a French courtier excelling at sports and likely to please the young king. On 1 March 1583, Davison and Bowes presented Elizabeth's requests to James VI, including her concerns that Mothe-Fénelon had discussed an "association" of James and his mother, Mary, Queen of Scots. Tactful and helpful, Davison worked closely with the Queen's agent in Scotland, Robert Bowes until September 1584. In this period he returned to England briefly, and came back to Scotland. He crossed the border with Alexander Hume and James Melville escorted him to Falkland Palace. Melville recalled that Davison had favoured the cause of James to inherit the English throne rather than his mother.

Davison reported on the ascendency of the royal favourite, James Stewart, Earl of Arran and his wife, Elizabeth Stewart. He wrote that she had obtained keys to the chests containing the royal jewels, and wore Queen Mary's clothes. Arran was becoming unpopular, and Davison heard that witches had foretold he would die a violent death. In March 1583, Davison delivered letters addressed to Mainville, and had to explain a delay because they had been intercepted and passed to Walsingham. Davison gathered information about a goldsmith named John Mosman who was carrying letters for Maineville and the French ambassador in London, Michel de Castelnau.

=== Amsterdam and Brill ===
The assassination of the Anglophile William the Silent, Prince of Orange, necessitated yet another mission to the Netherlands for Davison, already an experienced diplomat. He was assisted by William Brewster, who was later a passenger on the Mayflower. Davison accepted the keys of the town of Brielle at the end of September 1585 according to treaty. However, his authority clashed with that of the soldiers John Norris and Edward Norris.

Although praised for his diplomatic role by the Puritan Earl of Leicester, when he returned he found the Queen incensed by their assumption of the Governorship in Amsterdam; they had behaved too independently for an English mission. In a typically trenchant mood, Davison saw no need to apologise, but rather insisted that he would pray the Queen changed course. His biographer, Nicolas, described Davison as becoming depressed, withdrawing from Court to nurse his wounded Presbyterian pride. Davison eventually drifted away from Leicester, his erstwhile patron, and more towards the extreme war party around Walsingham. In the same year he became member of parliament for Knaresborough, a privy councillor, and assistant to Walsingham; but from 30 September 1586, he appears to have acted more as his colleague than as a subordinate.

=== Execution of Mary, Queen of Scots ===
Davison was a member of the commission appointed to try Mary, Queen of Scots, although he took no part in its proceedings. The judges sat on 11 October and proceedings began on the 14th. The commission was prorogued four days later, only to meet again on the 25th in the Star Chamber at Westminster. In her absence the Queen was still found guilty. On the 29th Parliament petitioned for execution to be carried out.

Meanwhile, the Privy Council, having been summoned by Lord Burghley, decided to draft the warrant on 6 December, two days after the Queen's Proclamation, and carry out the sentence at once. When sentence was passed upon Mary, the warrant for her execution was entrusted to Davison who, after some delay, obtained the Queen's signature on 1 February. On this occasion, and also in subsequent interviews with her secretary, Elizabeth suggested that Mary should be executed in some more secret fashion, and her conversation afforded ample proof that she disliked the idea of taking any responsibility upon herself for the death of her rival. Elizabeth ordered Davison to hold on to it, unsealed. Davison passed it over to Burghley, who immediately dispatched it to Fotheringhay Castle. Mary was beheaded on 8 February 1587. Officially Davison continued as principal secretary until Walsingham's death in April 1590. However, Walsingham remained the more dominant personality, and is generally considered to have been the mastermind behind the scheme to execute the Queen of Scots.

== Scapegoat ==
When the news of the execution reached Elizabeth she was extremely indignant, and her wrath was chiefly directed against Davison, who, she asserted, had disobeyed her instructions not to seal the warrant, but this instruction did not arrive until 2 February 1587, and Burghley had already taken the initiative. (Note: Lord Burghley held a crucial Privy Council meeting on 3 February at his house at which they agreed to seal the warrant without telling the Queen.) The secretary was arrested and thrown into the Tower, but although he defended himself vigorously, he did not say anything about the Queen's wish to get rid of Mary by assassination. (Note: Queen Elizabeth I issued a Royal Proclamation and signed the Warrant, eventually. But there is evidence that Burghley and Walsingham manipulated the Privy Council to provoke the Queen and managed Parliament to rubber-stamp the execution warrants. Davison is generally thought to have been superseded by the dual power brokers Walsingham and Cecil, with authority assumed from Davison.) Charged before the Star Chamber with misprision and contempt, he was acquitted of evil intention, but was sentenced to pay a fine of 10,000 marks and to imprisonment during the Queen's pleasure.

Owing to the exertions of several influential men he was released in September 1588, after the invasion crisis had passed; the Queen, however, refused to employ him again in her service, but he kept his office, and probably never paid the fine. His friends, notably the Earl of Essex, tried to get him the exercise of the Secretary's office, particularly after Walsingham's death in 1590. However, Burghley coveted the post, keeping it vacant for his son Robert Cecil. Davison was excluded from the emoluments of office for the remainder of the reign. And James I was even less likely to offer preferment.

Davison and family retired to Stepney, where he died on 21 December 1608, and was buried on the 24th. The fruits of the office of Custos Brevium were "benefit of said office wholly to me and my assigns". Despite mortgaging his home in 1579, it seems his widow was not evicted; the debt was not called until much later.

Davison appears to have been an industrious and outspoken man, and was undoubtedly made the scapegoat for the Queen's conduct. By his wife, Catherine Spelman, daughter of Henry Spelman of Norfolk, whom he married around 1570, he had a family of four sons and two daughters. His wife was Leicester's 'cousin' by marriage.

Two of his sons, Francis and Walter, obtained some celebrity as poets.

Many state papers written by him, and many of his letters, are extant in various manuscript collections. His will's executors were brothers of Gray's Inn, George and Robert Byng, who had mortgaged his house in Stepney. Davison left his widow with large debts. When all debts were paid on the sale of the house, his second son Christopher Davison was to inherit the right to a Treasury Office as stated in the will proven 9 January 1609.

Offices held
Date	Post
1566	Secretary to Henry Killigrew
June 1566 – 1575 or 1576	Ambassador to Scotland
26 March–20 May 1576	Envoy to Netherlands
August 1577–May 1579	Envoy to Netherlands
10 December 1582–September 1584	Envoy to Scotland
25 August 1585–February 1586	Envoy to Netherlands
30 September 1586	Principal secretary and Privy Councillor
by 1607	Clerk of Treasury and custos brevium of King's bench Records.

== In popular culture ==
He is a minor character in the play Maria Stuart by Friedrich Schiller.

== Bibliography ==
- Nicholas Harris Nicolas, Life of William Davison: Secretary of State and Privy Counsellor to Queen Elizabeth, Nichols (1823)
- "Davison, William (1541?-1608)" . Dictionary of National Biography. London: Smith, Elder & Co. 1885–1900.

Z

Political offices
Preceded by Sir Francis Walsingham	Secretary of State; 1586–1587; With: Sir Francis Walsingham	Succeeded by Sir Francis Walsingham
