= List of English writers =

List of English writers lists writers in English, born or raised in England (or who lived in England for a lengthy period), who already have Wikipedia pages. References for the information here appear on the linked Wikipedia pages. The list is incomplete – please help to expand it by adding Wikipedia page-owning writers who have written extensively in any genre or field, including science and scholarship. Please follow the entry format. A seminal work added to a writer's entry should also have a Wikipedia page. This is a subsidiary to the List of English people. There are or should be similar lists of Irish, Scots, Welsh, Manx, Jersey, and Guernsey writers.

This list is split into four pages due to its size:

- List of English writers (A–C)
- List of English writers (D–J)
- List of English writers (K–Q)
- List of English writers (R–Z)

Entries may be accessed alphabetically from here via:

== See also ==
- English literature
- English novel
- List of children's literature authors
- List of children's non-fiction writers
- List of English-language poets
- List of English novelists
- Lists of writers
