= Ellen Heaton =

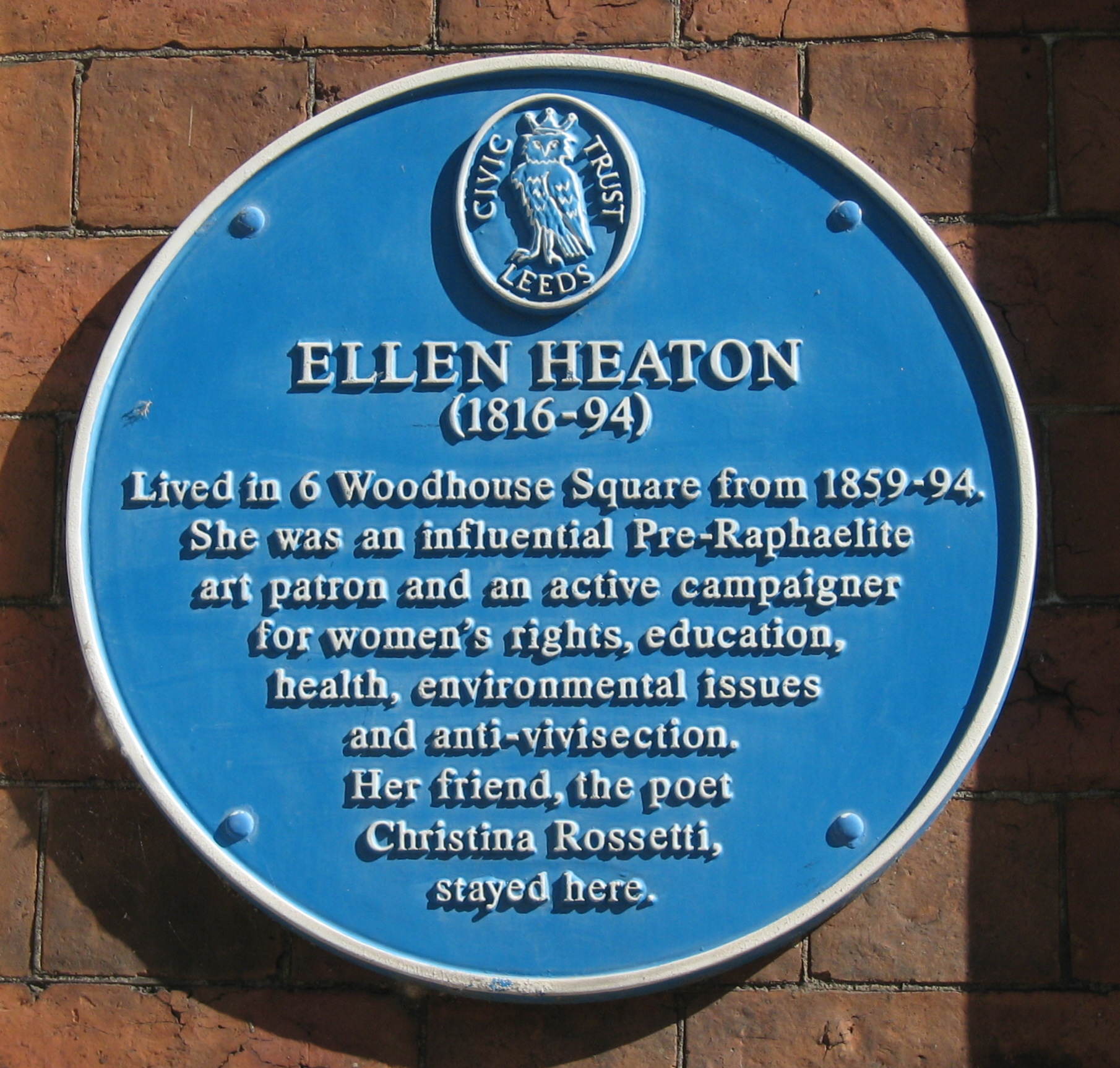
- Blue plaque on her house, 6 Woodhouse Square
- Born: 1816
- Died: 1894 (aged 77–78); Leeds
- Monuments: Blue Plaque
- Occupations: Arts patron, women's rights campaigner

Ellen Heaton (1816–1894) was a philanthropist and art collector in Leeds, best known for her patronage of and friendships with members and associates of the Pre-Raphaelite Brotherhood and the influential art critic John Ruskin.

== Biography ==
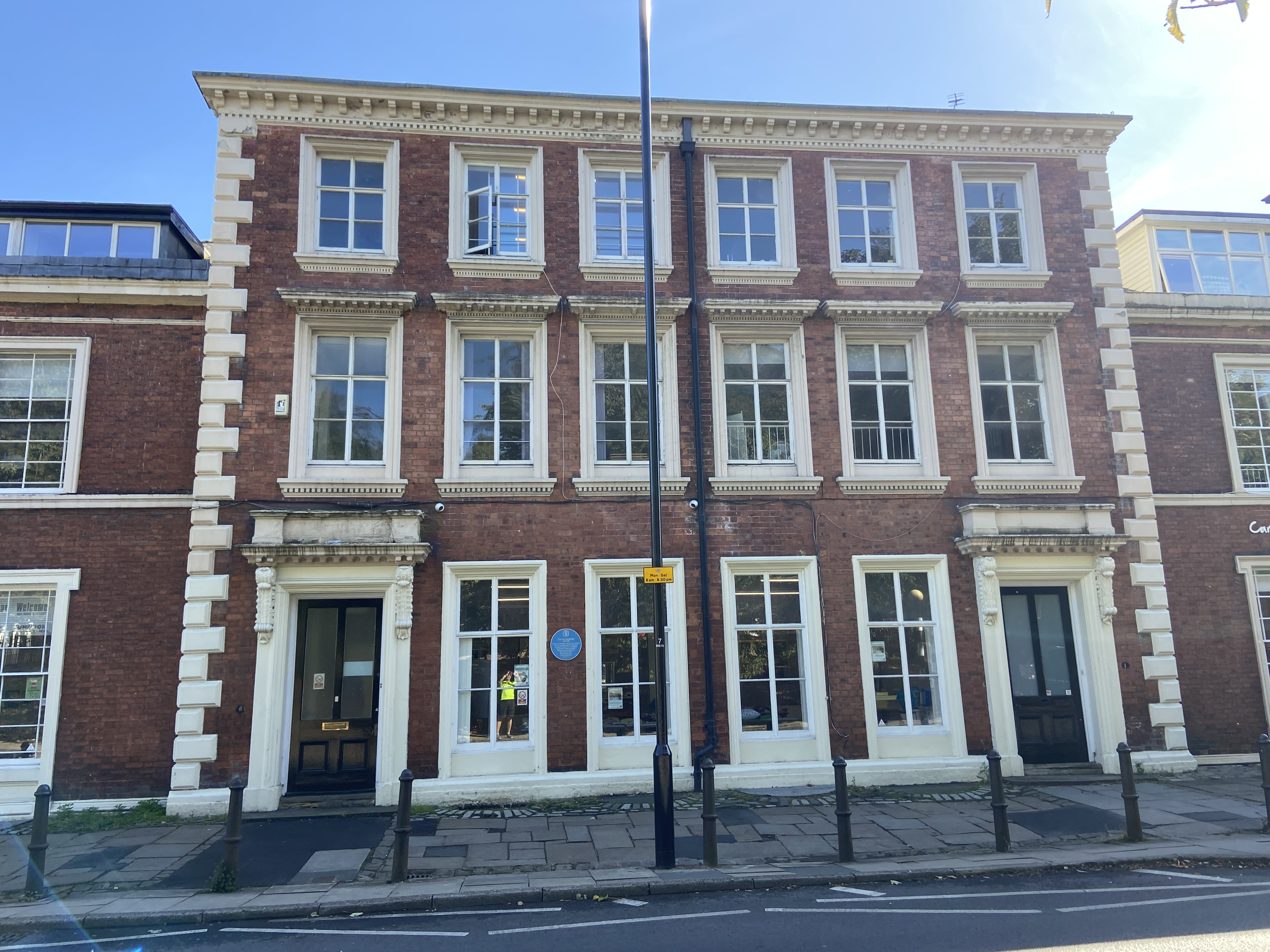
6 Woodhouse Square, Leeds, the home of Ellen Heaton from 1859 until her death in 1894.

Heaton was born on 8 November 1816 at 7 Briggate, Leeds, the daughter and eldest child of John and Ann Heaton. Her younger brother was the physician John Deakin Heaton. Discouraged from continuing her studies by the prevailing antipathy towards female education, she joined Leeds Literary and Philosophical Society (of which her brother was, at one time, President), amongst various other societies and libraries and began to correspond with authors.

After her father's retirement, the family moved to Park Square in Leeds. After her mother's death Heaton became carer to her father. After his death in 1852 she inherited a substantial amount, allowing her independence to travel and to start an art collection. In 1859 she purchased the house at 6 Woodhouse Square where she lived for the rest of her life. Heaton was a notable art collector, whose collection of pre-Raphaelite paintings is now housed at Tate Britain.

In her account of the Pre-Raphaelite movement, Fiona MacCarthy describes her as "a wealthy, well-travelled, forthright maiden lady." She was less keen on the more sensual and erotic Pre-Raphaelite paintings, and left Ruskin embarrassed when she refused a Burne-Jones painting he had brought to her attention.

== Tributes ==
Heaton's name is one of those featured on the sculpture Ribbons, unveiled in 2024.

Her house is now the campus of the Swarthmore Education Centre, which holds an annual lecture in her memory. There is a Blue Plaque dedicated to her on the house.
