= Ribbons (sculpture) =

2024 sculpture by Pippa Hale in Leeds, England

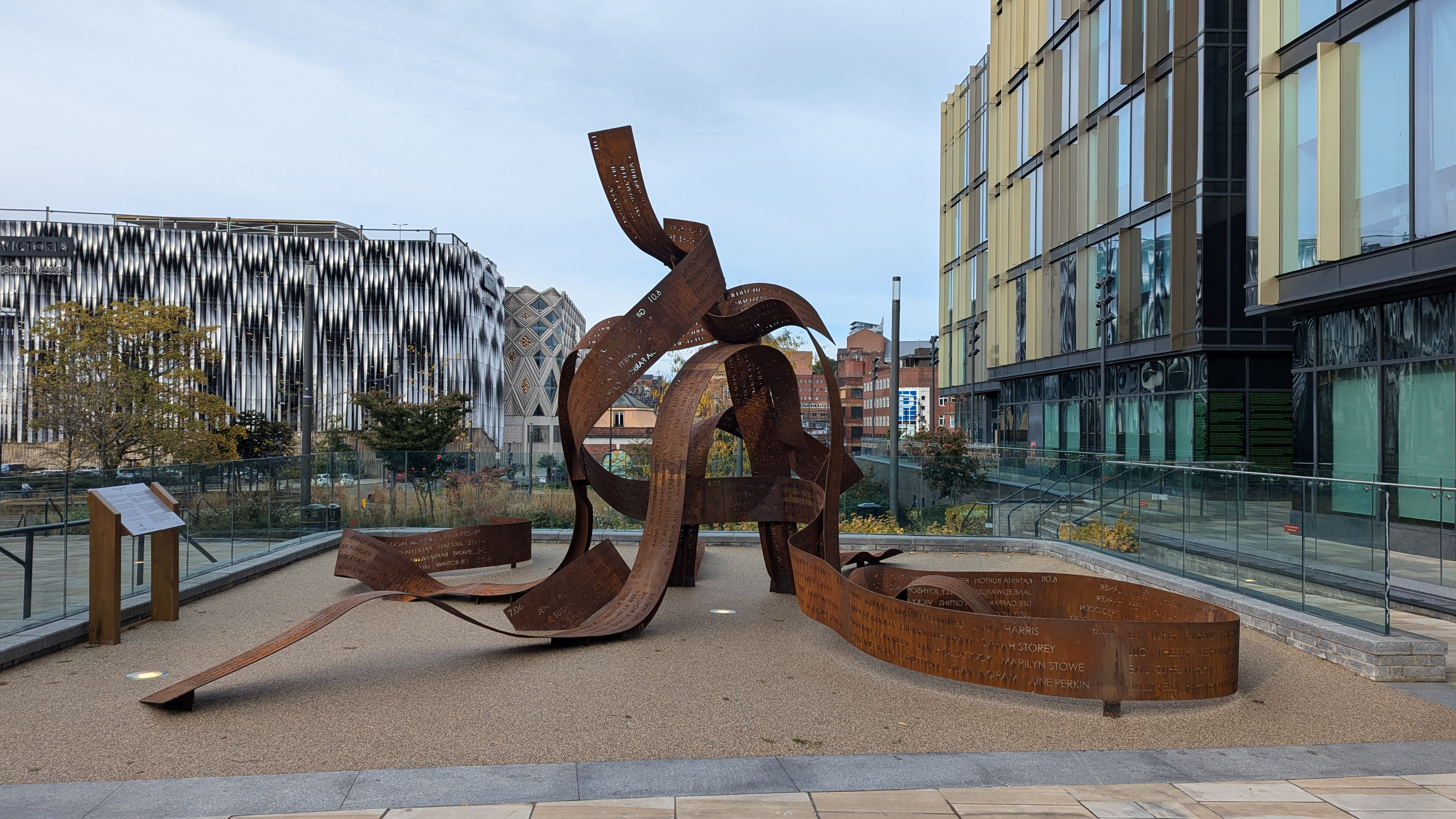
- Ribbons (14 October 2024)
- Artist: Pippa Hale
- Year: 2024
- Medium: Corten steel
- Subject: Women of Leeds
- Dimensions: 5 m (16 ft)
- Location: Leeds; 53.7985°N 1.5344°W
- Website: https://www.ribbons-sculpture-leeds.co.uk/

Ribbons (2024) is an outdoor sculpture in Leeds, England, by Pippa Hale, which was unveiled on 11 October 2024. Shaped like entwined ribbons, this corten steel sculpture celebrates and commemorates the achievements of women in Leeds, by featuring the names of 383 women nominated by the public. This goes some way to redressing the gender imbalance in public art in Leeds.

== Background ==
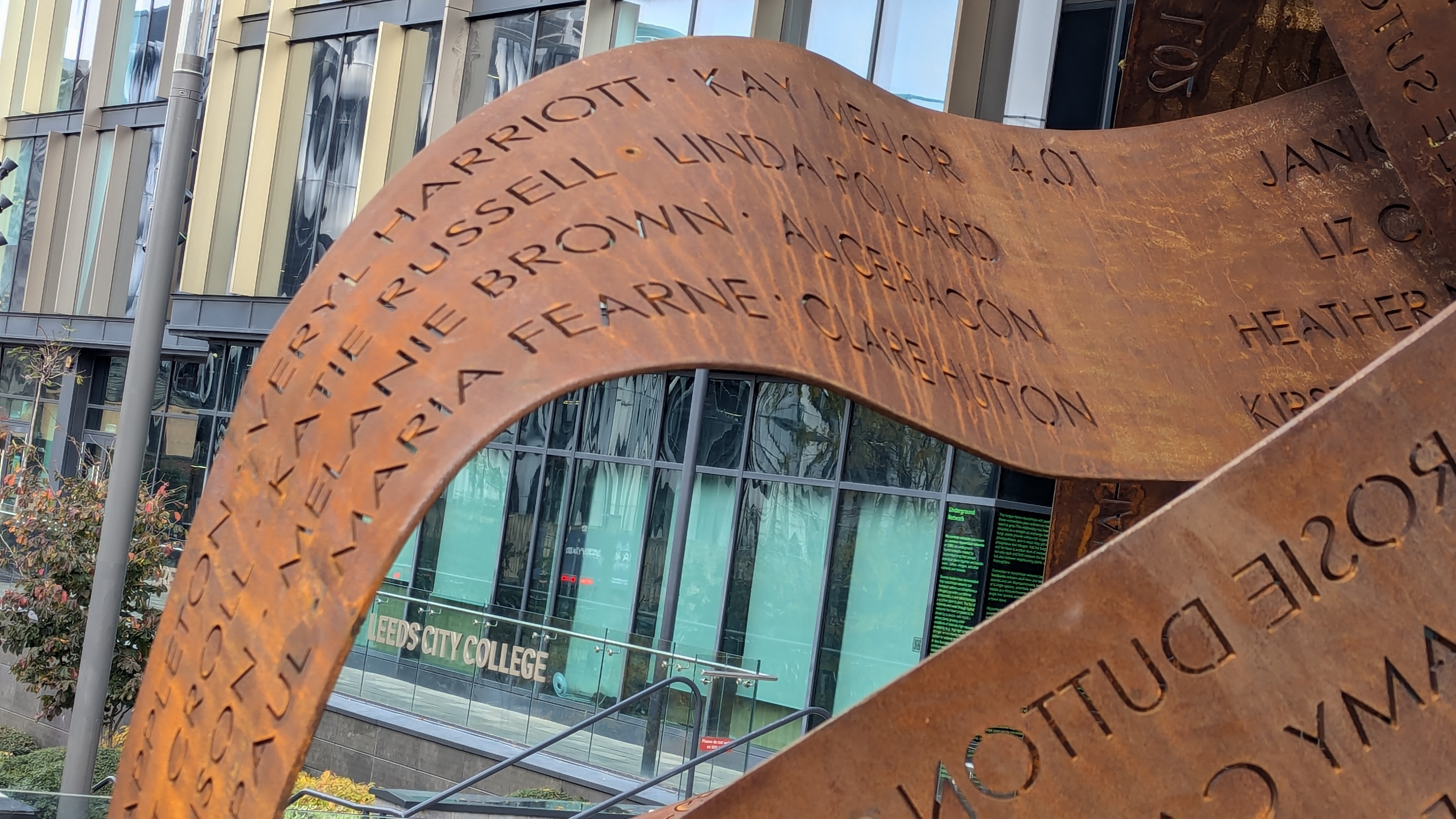
Segment of Ribbons, featuring names of geologist Maria Fearne, Alice Bacon, Mel B and Kay Mellor

The project was begun by Rachel Reeves, MP for Leeds West, who instigated a partnership between Leeds Arts University, Leeds City College and Leeds City Council to create a new public artwork that featured women. Former leader of Leeds City Council, Judith Blake, was a key proponent of the project.

In 2019 four artists – Wendy Briggs, Pippa Hale, Zsófia Jakab and Briony Marshall – were shortlisted after an open call. The four created maquettes which were then exhibited at Leeds Arts University, where members of the public could view them and contribute feedback. This consultation was included in the decision-making process by a panel of judges, including Reeves, to choose the winning sculptor. The chosen artist was Hale, who described her proposal for the sculpture as: "Ribbons tie many parts together, so the idea is that we are binding the names of these women together over time and space in a celebration of womanhood."

The women who feature on the sculpture were nominated by public vote, which opened in October 2019. People were encouraged to put forward both famous women from Leeds, and also women whose everyday actions made a difference to the lives of those in their communities.

== Description ==
The sculpture is situated in outdoor space between Leeds Playhouse and Leeds City College's Quarry Hill campus. At 5 metres (16 ft) tall, it comprises five corten steel ribbons, with women's names cut into them. The names are in sans-serif capital letters without any titles or honorifics, and are arranged randomly. They represent 383 women from Leeds who were nominated to feature in the sculpture.

== Construction ==
The firms involved in constructing the sculpture included Fish Fabrications, Norwich; Skyhooks Engineering, Wakefield; and the Fereday Cylinder Company, Dudley.

== Reception ==
In 2020 Leeds City Council commissioned a review into its public art, which highlighted the lack of diversity in public sculpture. The review was led by Alison Lowe. Ribbons was highlighted as an important part of the process to redress the gender imbalance in public art in the city. At its unveiling Rachel Reeves said that it is "a chance to honour inspiring women from all walks of life, and celebrate the achievements of the many women who have made Leeds the wonderful city it is today".

== Selected women who feature ==
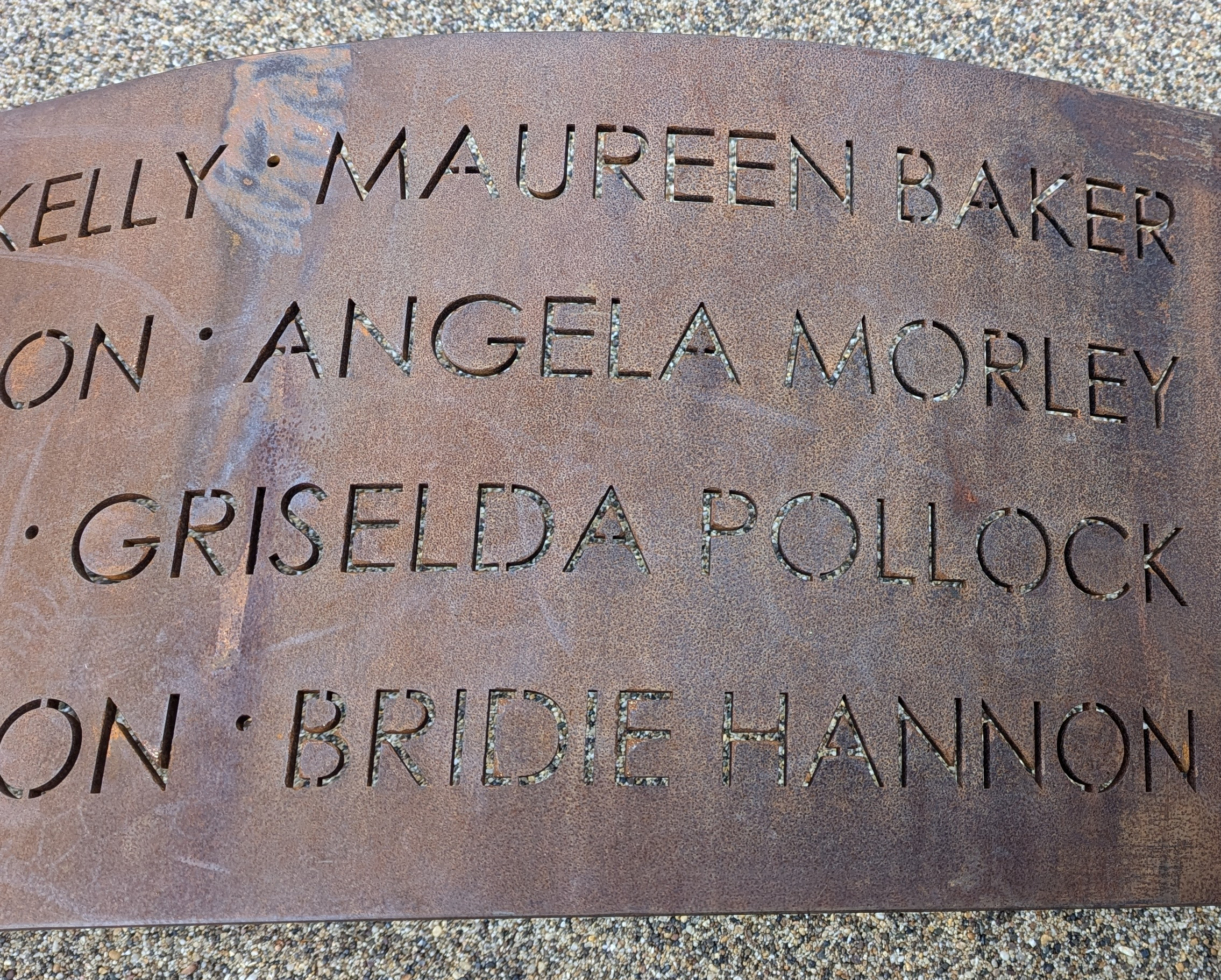
Segment of Ribbons with names of Angela Morley and others

The full list of the 383 women featured, with biographical details and, in most cases, images, is published on the project's website.

- Nicola Adams – Olympic boxer
- Alice Bacon – politician
- Corinne Bailey Rae – songwriter and musician
- Ivy Benson – saxophonist and bandleader
- Judith Blake – politician
- Melanie Brown/Mel B – singer and activist
- Catherine Mary Buckton – campaigner and writer.
- Ann Carr – evangelist.
- Leonora Cohen – suffragette, trade unionist and magistrate –
- Violet Crowther – curator.
- Maud Dightam – politician, socialist and activist.
- Emily Ford – artist and campaigner for women's rights.
- Isabella Ford – suffragist
- Mary Gawthorpe – suffragist
- Ellen Heaton – philanthropist and art collector.
- May Sybil Leslie - chemist who worked with Marie Curie and Ernest Rutherford.
- Alison Lowe – politician
- Alice Mann – radical and publisher.
- Catherine Mawer – architectural sculptor.
- Lucy Moore – curator
- Angela Morley – composer
- Adelaide Neilson – stage actress.
- Anne Neville – engineer
- Alice Nutter – musician and writer
- Lucy Osburn – Leeds-born nurse, founder of modern nursing in Australia.
- Gertrude Paul – teacher and Carnival founder
- Edith Pechey – doctor
- Griselda Pollock – art historian
- Rachel Reeves – politician
- Natasha Sayce-Zelem – technology strategist
- Nadine Senior – founder of Northern School of Contemporary Dance
- Barbara Taylor Bradford – author
- Fanny Waterman - Pianist and Founder of the Leeds International Piano Competition
- Karen Watson – co-founder East Street Arts
- Sharon Watson – dancer and teacher
