= Maud Dightam =

English politician, socialist and activist

Councillor
- In office 1921–1924
- Constituency: East Leeds

Personal details
- Born: 1875
- Died: 24 December 1932 (aged 56–57)
- Party: Labour Party

Maud Dightam (née Rose) (1875 - 24 December 1932) was an English politician, socialist and activist from Leeds. She and Gertrude Dennison were the first two women to be elected to the Leeds City Council.

== Career ==
Maud Dightam first became interested in socialism when her brother moved away and she read some books on the subject, which he had left behind. She was instrumental in forming the Leeds Women's Labour League and was one of the founders of East Leeds Socialist Sunday School. At different points, she also held the posts of president, vice-president and secretary of the Women's Central Committee of the Leeds Labour party. Although she was concerned with the cause of equal rights for women, she emphasised that socialism and class were more important to her than the suffrage cause.

She was a popular speaker and regularly addressed meetings across the county. During the General Strike of 1926, she addressed a miners' demonstration on the moors outside Wakefield. She was invited to speak at nearly every May Day demonstration of the Leeds Labour party.

=== Leeds City Council ===
Dightam was the first woman to be elected as a Labour Party councillor to Leeds City Council. She stood as the Labour candidate for the East Leeds ward in 1921 and had the support of James O'Grady, who was MP for Leeds South East, winning with a majority of 1,200. During the same election, Gertrude Dennison was the first woman to be elected as a Conservative candidate. Dightam served on the council between 1921 and 1924, including on the Cleansing, Health and Education committees.

== Personal life ==
Dightam married Ernest Dightam, also from Leeds, in 1904 and had a daughter, Eveline Mary, in 1905. Ernest was a conscientious objector during World War I. Maud Dightam died at her home on York Road in Leeds on 24 December 1932. She was cremated at Lawnswood Crematorium and her ashes were scattered on Ilkley Moor at her request.

== Legacy ==
Dightam's name is one of those featured on the sculpture Ribbons, unveiled in 2024.
