= AWI =

AWI or Awi may refer to:

== Awi ==
- the Awi people, an ethnic group in Ethiopia
- Awi, Iran, a village in Zanjan Province, Iran

== AWI ==
- IATA airport code for Wainwright Airport (Alaska)
- ICAO airline code for Air Wisconsin
- Alfred Wegener Institute for Polar and Marine Research, Germany's major organization for Arctic, Antarctic and deep sea research
- Animal Welfare Institute
- Arab World Institute
- Australian Watercolour Institute
- American War of Independence
- Axial Ward-Takahashi identity, used to calculate quark masses in lattice gauge theory
- Approved Work Item is a status in the development of an ISO standard

== See also ==
- AW (disambiguation)
- AW1 (disambiguation)
- Awl (disambiguation)
