= John Challice =

English physician

- Born: 1815; Horsham
- Died: 11 May 1863 (aged 47–48)
- Occupation: Physician

John Challice (1815 – 11 May 1863) was an English physician.

== Biography ==
Challice was born at Horsham, Sussex, in 1815. He became a physician in London, and besides attaining some eminence in his profession was an active liberal politician, an intimate friend of Sir William Molesworth, Admiral Sir Charles Napier, and other representatives of Southwark. He was one of the first medical officers of health for Bermondsey, in which capacity he published various reports in 1856 and subsequent years. He also wrote 'Should the Cholera come, what ought to be done?' (1848); a cheap tract 'How to avoid the Cholera,' of which many thousands were sold; 'Medical Advice to Mothers' (1851); 'Letter to Lord Palmerston on Sanitary Reform' (1854); and 'How do People hasten Death?' (1851). He was M.D. and F.R.C.P. Edin. He died suddenly on 11 May 1863.

His wife was the author Annie Emma Challice.
