= Nicholas Bradshawe =

Nicholas Bradshawe (fl. 1635), was a fellow of Balliol College, Oxford. He was the author of Canticvm Evangelicvm Summam Sacri Evangelii continens, London, 1635, dedicated to Sir Arthur Mainwaring.
