= Annie Emma Challice =

English author

- Born: Annie Emma Armstrong; 1821; London, England
- Died: 1875; London, England
- Citizenship: United Kingdom
- Occupation: Author
- Spouse: John Challice
- Writing career
- Language: English
- Years active: 1847-1873
- Genres: History; Fiction
- Subjects: French authors and philosophers

Annie Emma Challice (1821–1875) was an English author. She wrote primarily about French history, specifically biographical collections of French philosophers and authors. She also wrote fiction.

== Life ==
She was born Annie Emma Armstrong in London in 1821. She married physician John Challice. She died in London in 1875.

== Bibliography ==
- The Sister of Charity: or, From Bermondsey to Belgravia. London: Bentley (1852).
- The Wife's Temptation: A Tale of Belgravia. London: Westerton (1859).
- The secret history of the court of France, under Louis XV. Ed. from rare and unpublished documents. London: Hurst and Blackett (1861).
- Illustrious women of France, 1790-1873. New York: Scribner, Welford (1873).
