= Georgette Agnew =

Author, WWII Poet (1865-1957)

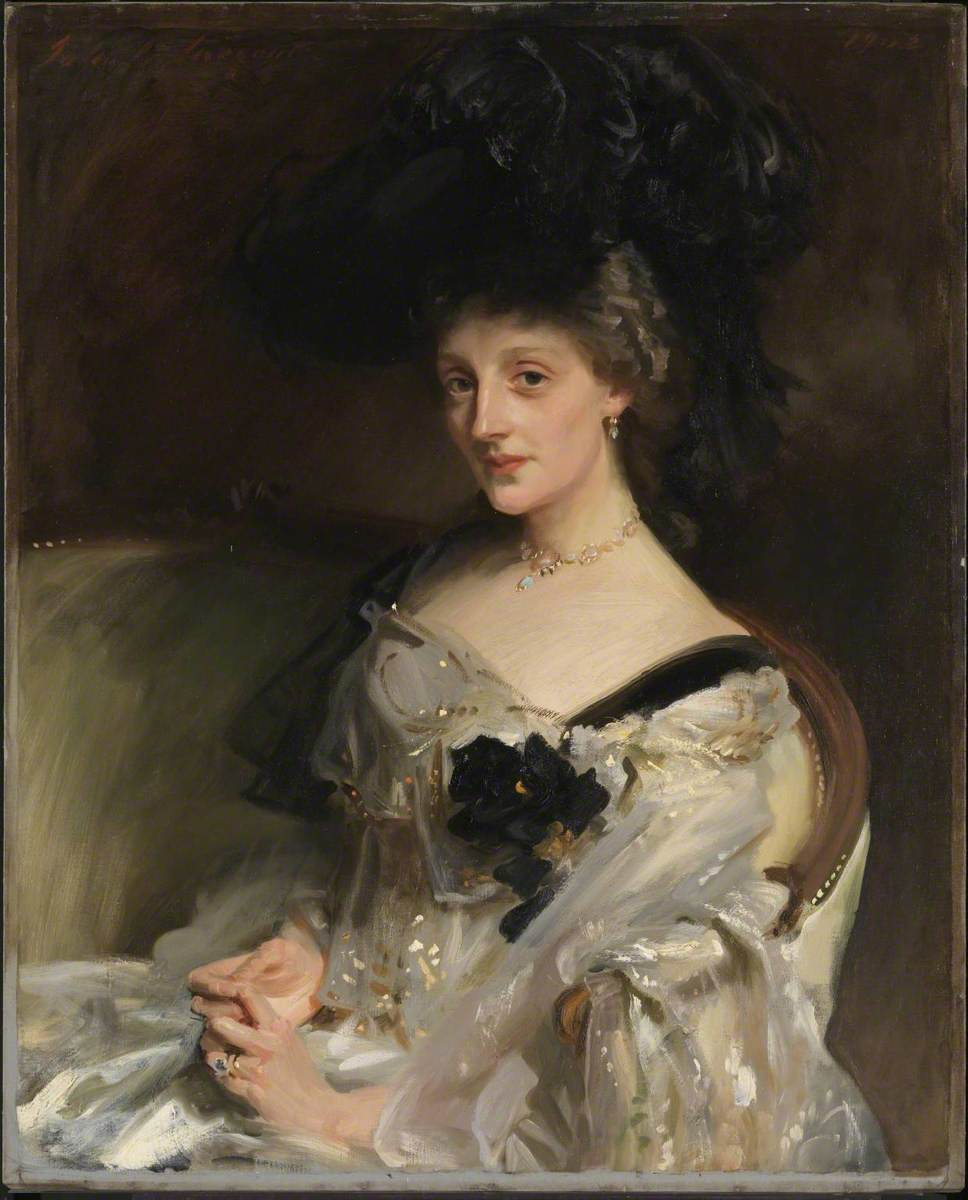
- Portrait by John Singer Sargent, 1902
- Born: Georgette Alexandra Agnew; June 11, 1865
- Died: June 12, 1957 (aged 92)
- Spouse: Philip Agnew (married 1889)

Georgette Agnew (1865–1957) was an English writer who occasionally published works under the pseudonym Nevin Halys. She was brought up in Egypt.

== Literary Works ==
Agnew's style has been described as "smooth but undistinguished verse", and characterised as having "Dickensian mannerisms". In 1908 she published the novel The night that brings out the stars, which received an unflattering review in The Spectator: "We would suggest to Mrs. Agnew that she should be more sparing of ornament", and compared her writing style to the Della Cruscans. Her plays in The Hut Above the Tarn were described by the same publication in 1930 as being "more suited for acting by amateurs than the professional stage".

She wrote a range of works, including plays, poetry, verse and three romantic novels: The Bread Upon The Waters, The Night That Brings Out The Stars and The Countess. During World War II she produced the collections Songs of Love and Grief and Sonnets.
