= Bob Clarke (historian) =

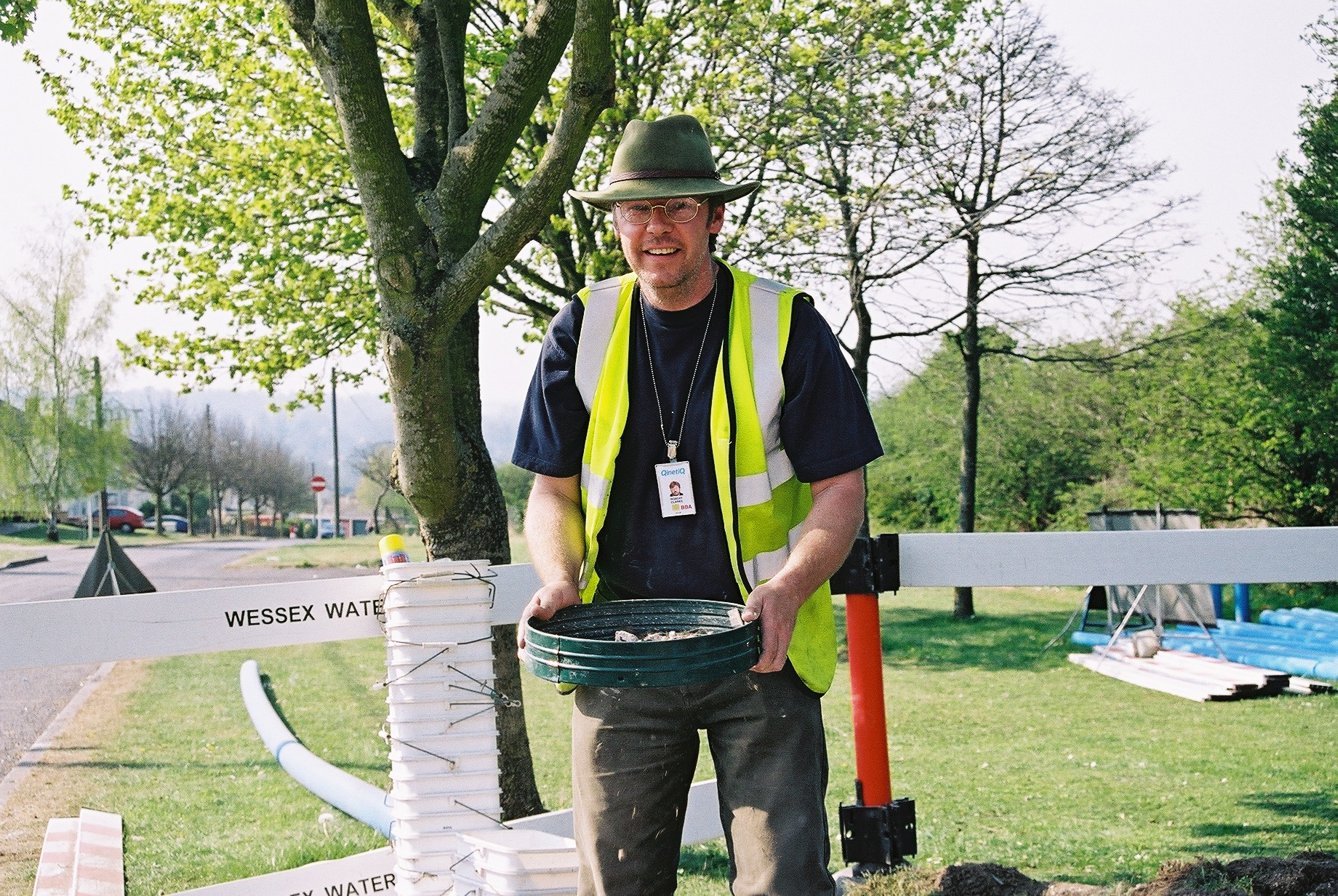
- Clarke at the excavation of the Boscombe Bowmen
- Occupation: Archaeologist

Academic background
- Education: University of Exeter
- Doctoral advisor: Oliver Creighton; Stephen Rippon

Academic work
- Discipline: Archaeology
- Sub-discipline: Landscape archaeology
- Institutions: Wessex Archaeology; University of Bath

Bob Clarke (born in Scarborough in 1964) is an English archaeologist and historian. He gained a PhD at Exeter and is published widely. Current themes of research include the use of selected space to enact organised events, and the landscape archaeology of defence.

== Archaeological career ==
Clarke is a visiting tutor in archaeology at the University of Bath. He was educated in archaeology under professor Mick Aston and Julian Richards, followed by a period at Westminster Institute of Education, Oxford where he obtained his honours degree in post-compulsory education. Clarke held the post of QinetiQ Archaeologist at Boscombe Down between 1996 and 2008; he returned to the post in July 2013. In September 2017 he joined Wessex Archaeology, an archaeological and heritage practice, as Research Manager. His research areas cover a number of periods including prehistoric and Roman Wiltshire, and British military architecture of the 20th century (airfields and nuclear), an area where he is considered an authority. He is credited with the discovery of Broad Town Man, a Saxon execution burial in North Wiltshire.

In 2017, Clarke was awarded Doctor of Philosophy in Archaeology. His work was supervised by Professor Oliver Creighton and Professor Stephen Rippon. Clarke's thesis, through the University of Exeter, postulated that the archaeology of the Cold War can be utilised in the mapping of human intervention in the landscape. Recognising change from Order to Chaos it is possible to predict the type of material culture that will be encountered on sites connected with highly ordered organisation. Current research is now taking the 'Order and Chaos' model and applying it to a range of situations.

== Authoring ==
In 2005 Clarke authored Four Minute Warning: Britain's Cold War, published by Tempus that same year. This set the scene for further works including Ten Tons for Tempelhof: The Berlin Airlift in May 2007, publishing the memories of many veterans for the first time, along with pictures from private collections. In February 2008 The Archaeology of Airfields was published by The History Press (formally Tempus Publishing). Airfields is the first publication to bring together all periods of military aviation, including the Cold War, and discuss them utilising a framework of landscape archaeology. In December 2008 The Jet Provost: A Little Plane With a Big History was released by Amberley Publishing, followed, in October 2009, by The Illustrated Guide to Armageddon. The following October (2010) Remember Scarborough appeared in print, again through Amberley. In a departure from his 20th-century research Clarke published Prehistoric Wiltshire: An Illustrated Guide, in collaboration with the Wiltshire Heritage Museum, in September 2011. Later work includes books on Royal Wootton Bassett (published in May 2013), Devizes, and further 20th-century-related subjects including the construction effort required for war.

Aside to the books, Clarke has published papers in a number of academic journals on archaeological themes. Subjects include Cold War nuclear bunkers in Wiltshire, Bronze Age metalwork, Roman building techniques, earthworks near Stonehenge, and Saxon executions.

== Editorial output ==
Clarke has held the position of Honorary Review Editor for the Wiltshire Archaeological and Natural History Magazine, the Wiltshire County journal, since 2006. In 2011 he was invited onto the Editorial Board of Ex Historia, the post graduate historical journal of the University of Exeter. He is now archaeological specialist and peer reviewer for the journal.
