= James Cancellar =

English theologist fl. 1564

James Cancellar (fl. 1564), was an English theological writer. Cancellar describes himself as 'one of the Queen's Majesty's most hon. chapel' at the beginning of Mary's reign. Probably he was the James Cancellar who, on 27 July 1554, was admitted as proctor for Hugh Barret, priest, to the mastership of the Hospital of Poor Priests at Canterbury.

His works are:

- The Pathe of Obedience, righte necessarye for all the King and Queenes Majesties subjectes to reade learne and use their due obediences to the hyghe powers according to thys godlye Treatise, London [1553], 8vo; dedicated to Queen Mary.
- A Treatise, wherein is declared the pernitious opinions of those obstinate people of Kent, London, 1553, 8vo.
- Of the Life active and contemplative, entitled The Pearle of Perfection, London, 1558, 8vo.
- Meditations set forth after the alphabet of the Queens name. Dedicated to Queen Elizabeth. Printed at the end of the translation by Queen Elizabeth of the 'Meditation' of Margaret, queen of Navarre, London (H. Denham), 24mo.
- An Alphabet of Prayers, London, 1564, 1576, 16mo. In this alphabet 'many prayers have the first letter of them in alphabetical order; and the initial letter of others form his patron's name, Robert Dudley.'
