= Thomas Ashe (writer) =

Irish writer

- Born: c. 1770; Glasnevin, Ireland
- Died: 17 December 1835 (aged 64–65); Bath, United Kingdom
- Occupation: Novelist

Thomas Ashe (1770–1835) was an Irish novelist and miscellaneous writer.

== Biography ==
Ashe was the third son of a half-pay officer, and was born at Glasnevin, near Dublin, 15 July 1770. He received a commission in the 83rd regiment of foot, which, however, was almost immediately afterwards disbanded; and he was sent to a counting-house at Bordeaux. There he suffered a short imprisonment for wounding in a duel a gentleman whose sister he had seduced, but, the wound not proving fatal, the prosecution was not persisted in.

Returning to Dublin, Ashe was appointed secretary to the Diocesan and Endowed Schools Commission, but, after falling into debt, he resigned his office and retired to Switzerland. He then spent several years in foreign travel, living, according to his own account, in a free and unconstrained fashion, and experiencing a somewhat chequered fortune.

In his later years Ashe was short of money. He died at Bath on 17 December 1835.

== Works ==
Besides recording in his Memoirs his impressions of the countries he visited, Ashe published separately:

- Travels in America in 1806, for the Purpose of Exploring the rivers Alleghany, Monongahela, Ohio and Mississippi..., 1808;
- Memoirs of Mammoth and other Bones found in the vicinity of the Ohio, 1806
- A Commercial and Geographical Sketch of Brazil and Madeira, 1812.
- History of the Azores, Or Western Islands Containing an Account of the Government, Laws and Religion, the Manners, Ceremonies, and Character of the Inhabitants and Demonstrating the Importance of These Valuable Islands to the British Empire,1813.

He was also the author of novels, including the Spirit of the Book, 1811, 4th edition 1812; the Liberal Critic, or Henry Percy, 1812: and the Soldier of Fortune, 1816.
