= Catherine Mary Buckton =

British campaigner and writer

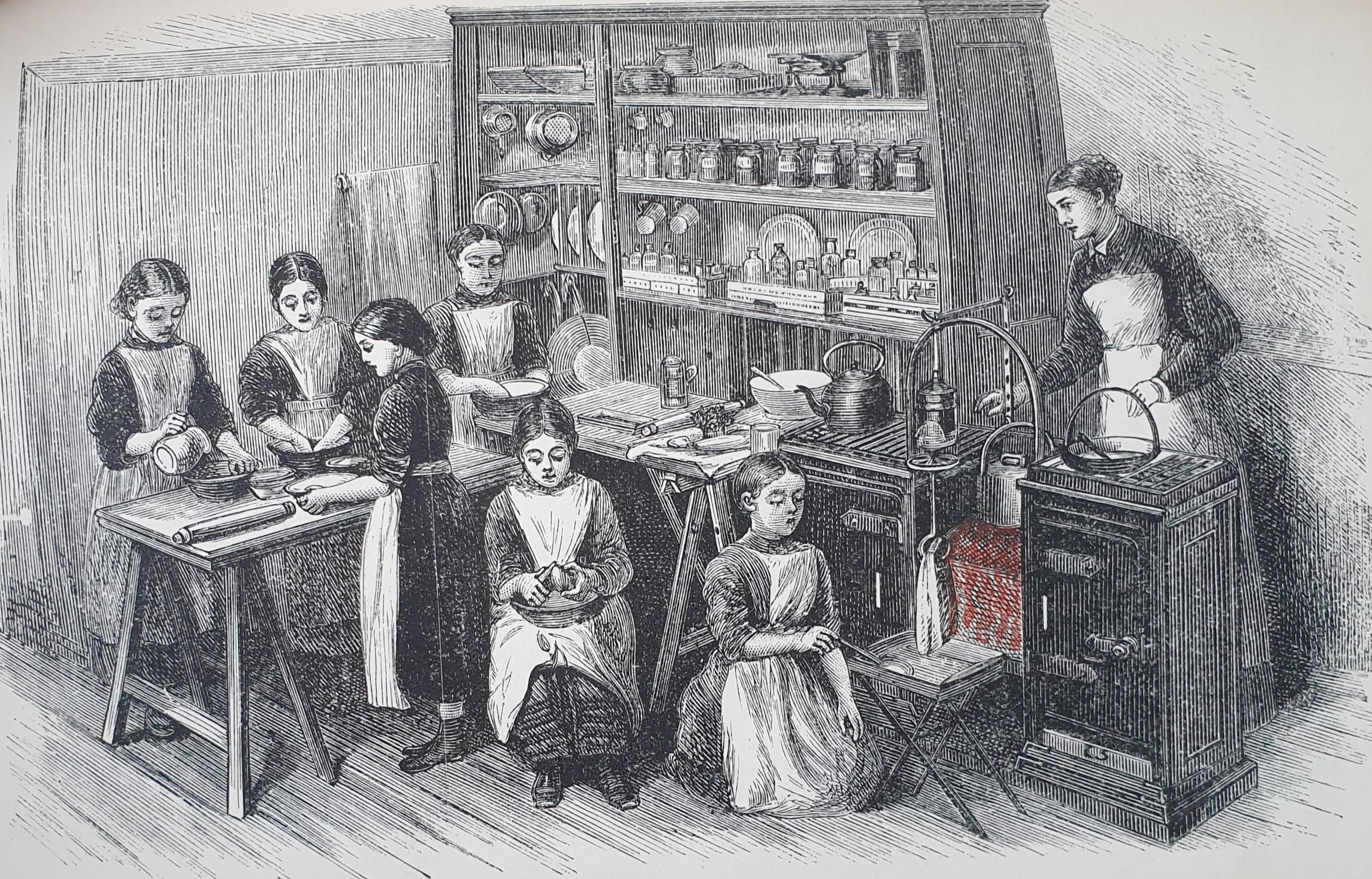
Catherine Buckton, 'Food and Home Cookery' (1890)

Catherine Mary Buckton (née Williams, 1826–1904) was a British campaigner and writer. She was based in Leeds, UK, and strongly believed in the education of women, and promoted hygienic practices.

== Biography ==
Catherine Buckton was born in Stoke Newington and was one of nine children. Her father was a surgeon specialising in the treatment of cholera and a pioneer of public health reform. She married Joseph Buckton (1811 - 1884), a successful cloth merchant in 1848. Buckton became the first woman in Leeds to hold elected public office when she became a member of the Leeds School Board in 1873.

She wrote a number of books: 'Health in the House, 25 Lectures on Elementary Physiology In Its Application To The Daily Wants of Man and Animals Delivered To The Wives and Children of Working-Men in Leeds and Saltaire' (1876), 'Food and Home Cookery', 'Our Dwellings, Healthy and Unhealthy' (1885), 'Town and Window Gardening, Including the Structures, Habits And Uses Of Plants, A Course Of 16 Lectures' (1879), and 'Comfort and Cleanliness (1894)'

== Books ==
- 'Health in the House, 25 Lectures on Elementary Physiology In Its Application To The Daily Wants of Man and Animals Delivered To The Wives and Children of Working-Men in Leeds and Saltaire' (1876)

This was based on a series of lectures given over a two year period to children aged between 10-13. She used Germ Theory to explain the risk of infection, and used anatomy and physiology as an aid to learning (page x, preface).

- 'Town and Window Gardening, Including the Structures, Habits And Uses Of Plants, A Course Of 16 Lectures (Given Out Of School Hours to Pupil -Teachers And Children Attending The Leeds Board Schools)' (1879)

Based upon a series of lectures given to children, includes an introduction to the scientific basis of gardening, as well as practical advice.

- 'Our Dwellings, Healthy and Unhealthy (Addressed To Girls Attending The Leeds Board Schools' (1885)

Aimed at girls aged 9 and above, written with explanations in basic science, and simple experiments to 'explain the nature of good and bad air, ventilation, and why we have fevers'.

== Recognition ==
Buckton's name is one of those featured on the sculpture Ribbons, unveiled in 2024.

== Sources ==
- "THEY LIVED IN LEEDS, Catherine Mary Buckton (1826-1904), Campaigner and Writer", The Thoresby Society
