= AW =

A&W, AW, Aw, aW or aw may refer to:

== Companies ==
- A&W Restaurants
  - A&W Root Beer
- A&W (Canada)
- Addison-Wesley, publishers
- Africa World Airlines, IATA code
- Prefix for helicopters made by AgustaWestland
- Alienware
- Allied Waste Industries, Inc, stock symbol on NYSE
- Armstrong Whitworth, a British manufacturing company

== Media and entertainment ==
- AW (album), 2025 album by Danish singer Annika
- Accel World, a Japanese light novel series
- Active Worlds, a 3D virtual reality platform
- Another World (TV series), an American soap opera
- Athletics Weekly, a monthly track and field magazine published in the United Kingdom
- Aviation Week & Space Technology, magazine
- Call of Duty: Advanced Warfare, an action video game

== People ==
- A. H. Weiler (1908 – 2002), The New York Times film critic whose early reviews were signed with his initials A. W.
- A. W. (poet), anonymous 16th century poet
- Abraham Washington (A. W.), American professional wrestler and wrestling commentator
- Alan Walker (born 1997), English-Norwegian music producer and DJ
- Aw (father), honorific title in the Harari and Somali languages
- Aw (surname), a Cantonese surname
- John-Allison Weiss, an American singer-songwriter formerly known as A. W.
- Andy Warhol, a leading figure in the pop art movement.

== Places ==
- Ahrweiler (district), Germany, vehicle registration code
- Aruba (ISO 3166-1 2-letter country code AW)

== Science and technology ==
- .aw, the internet top level domain country code for Aruba
- Airwatt, a unit of the effectiveness of vacuum cleaners
- Aw, categorization for tropical savanna climate in the Köppen classification system
- AW, in German email subject line, equivalent to Re:
- aw, or attowatt, an SI unit of power
- a_{w}, or water activity, the relative availability of water in a substance

== Other uses ==
- Agencja Wywiadu, the Polish foreign intelligence service
- Ahnapee and Western Railway, A&W
- Arctic Warfare, a sniper rifle
- Anthony Wayne Local School District, an American school district in Ohio
- Aviation Warfare Systems Operator, a rating in the United States Navy
- Aw, a digraph in Latin-script
- A US Navy hull classification symbol: Distilling ship (AW)

== See also ==
- Av
