= J. B. Bullen =

British writer

J. B. Bullen (Barrie Bullen) is an interdisciplinary writer specialising in examining the relationship between literature, mostly English literature, and art in the 19th and 20th centuries.

== Work ==
Bullen has written on Coleridge, Ruskin, Dickens, George Eliot, Dante Gabriel Rossetti, and Thomas Hardy. He is the editor of two notable series for the Peter Lang publishing company: Cultural Interactions: Studies in the Relationship between the Arts and Writing and (with Isobel Armstrong) Culture in the Long Nineteenth Century. Bullen took his first degree at the University of Cambridge. This was followed by spells as a researcher at the University of Oxford and at the University of Reading, where he remains an emeritus professor. He now holds the Chair of English Literature and Culture in the Department of English Literature at Royal Holloway, University of London.

== Private life ==
Bullen's spouse is the writer and painter Roma Tearne. They have three children.

== Selected publications ==
- 1986: The Expressive Eye: Vision and Perception in the Work of Thomas Hardy, Oxford: Oxford University Press
- 1995: The Myth of the Renaissance in Nineteenth-Century Writing, Oxford: Oxford University Press
- 1998: The Pre-Raphaelite Body: Fear and Desire in Painting, Poetry, and Criticism, Oxford: Oxford University Press
- 2003: Byzantium rediscovered, London: Phaidon.
- 2011: Rossetti: Painter and Poet, London: Frances Lincoln
- 2013: Thomas Hardy: the World of his Novels, London: Frances Lincoln
