= Lizzie Berry =

English poet

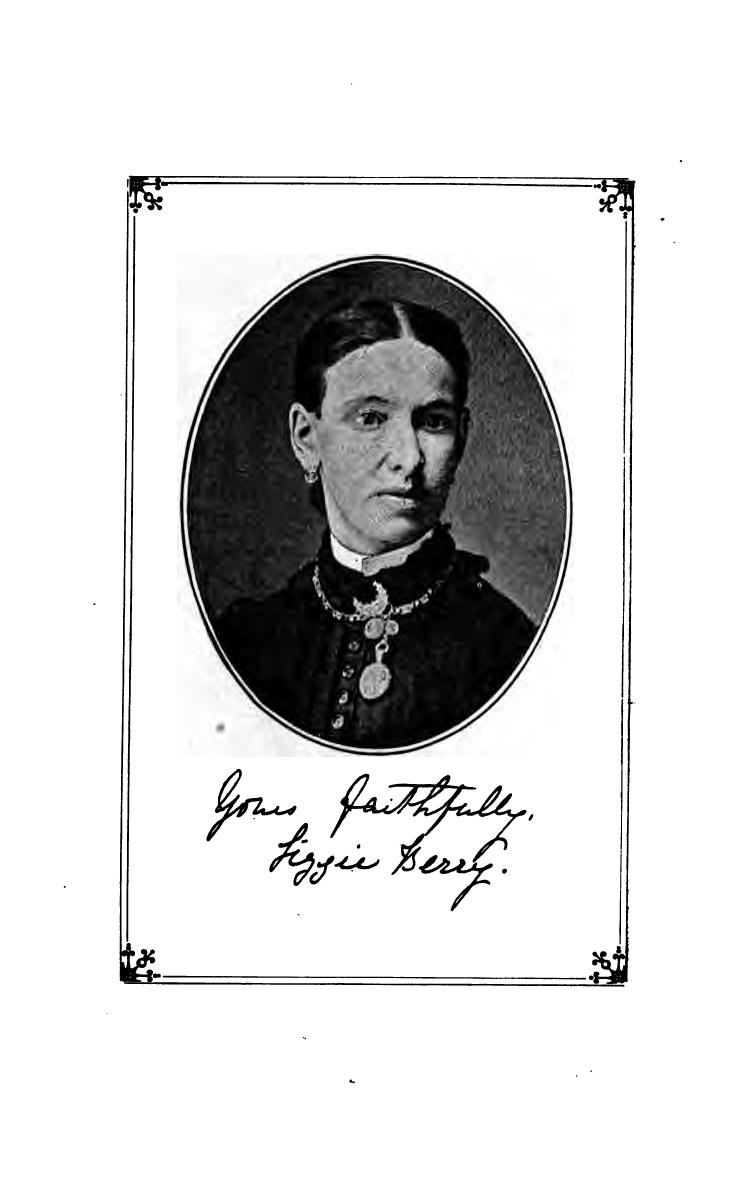
Lizzie Berry depicted in the frontispiece of Heart Echoes (1886)

Lizzie Berry (1847 – 1919) was a prolific writer of devotional and social protest poetry.

== Life ==
She was born Elizabeth Marshall in Great Bowden, Leicestershire, to working-class parents, labourer Jeremiah Marshall and his wife Elizabeth, a dressmaker.

Her first husband was John Archie Berry, a plasterer, whom she married on 29 October 1866 in Islington, London. They lost one son in infancy and had one surviving son, Archie.

After John Berry’s death in 1870 she married William Brooks Dexter in 1873 (also born in Great Bowden in 1847) in Brighton and gave birth to a daughter, Amy Constance Dexter, soon after. After moving back to Great Bowden William died in 1875 and Amy the following year 1876. In 1876 she married Arthur Langton Poyer and a son, Frank Berry Poyer, was born in 1878 By the 1881 census she was living with Edmund Kemp, a railway signalman in Hardingstone and had three children: Kathleen 1881, Sydney 1883 and William 1888. The marriage was unhappy and, by 1891, she had separated from him.

The 1891 census shows her living back in Great Bowden under the surname Berry as head of the household with her sons Frank, Sydney and William and daughter Kathleen, working as a poetess and dressmaker.

She maintained her children by her income from dressmaking and supplying poems to newspapers. She was able to cover the rent of her cottage between 1880 and 1918 by supplying poems to the Wharfedale and Airedale Observer at the rate of almost one per week.

Tragically according to the Market Harborough Advertiser of 29th September 1891 a Lizzie Poyer of Great Bowden was charged with attempted suicide by taking a quantity of laudanum. A further newspaper article from the Market Harborough Advertiser and Midland Mail, published Tuesday, 6 October 1891 reported on the subsequent trial. Her cousin, Frederick John Wickby, stated that she had said she was ‘tired of life’. Her mother, Mrs Elizabeth Marshall, stated that Lizzie had ‘been in trouble because of a man’ but that the local vicar had written to the man and told to stop all correspondence. The police had also given the man a ‘severe reprimand and told him that he would be locked up if he annoyed the woman again’. The magistrate told Mrs Poyer ‘the bench relied upon her to behave herself and the hearing terminated’. The man’s name was not reported. Given the mother’s name is included in the article then we know this Lizzie Poyer is one and the same Lizzie Berry.

Her Berry sons predeceased her and her Kemp sons emigrated to Canada. She died in the Spanish flu epidemic on 13 July 1919 at her home in Great Bowden.

== Poetry ==
Berry’s poetry was published by the Midland Times and the Wharfedale and Airedale Observer, and collected in Heart Echoes (269 poems, 1886) and Day Dreams (257 poems, 1893), as well as other volumes published privately or by the Midland Times. The volumes were popular and went through multiple editions, although her popularity did not outlive her.

Her poetry combined elements of the street ballad as well as lyric poetry. O’Brien calls it "poetry with a complication of conventional registers [which] inflects religious devotion with a fierce and often idiosyncratic feminism…" She criticises the physical and moral deformity and exploitation of workers caused by the fashion industry (“Fashion”), takes a cynical approach to lower-class women’s work in marriage (“A Woman’s Answer”), and encourages sympathy towards prostitutes (“Pass Her By!”).
