= James Burr =

British writer

- Born: James Burkes; 22 March 1971 (age 55); Wolverhampton, England
- Writing career
- Genres: Slipstream (genre), bizarro fiction, satire
- Subjects: Romantic love, insanity, consensus reality
- Website: www.myspace.com/jamesburr

James Burr is an English writer of dark, although often humorous, paranoiac fiction. His first collection of short stories, "Ugly Stories For Beautiful People", was published in 2007 and was favourably compared to the work of Russell Hoban, David Cronenberg, early Kurt Vonnegut, and Philip K. Dick. The collection featured "Foetal Attractions" which won second prize in the "Roadworks 2000 Short Story Competition" and two of the stories in the collection, "It" and "Blue" later garnered honorable mentions in that year's "The Year’s Best Fantasy and Horror".

HellNotes described the collection as "Odd, unique, very cool, and extremely readable", while Horror World described Burr as "not merely a 'new' voice, he is a fresh voice – a different and disturbing voice - and one deserving of your attention." His work has often been described as Bizarro fiction, although he has no direct links to the group of writers working under that banner.

His work echoes that of early J.G. Ballard with its fascination with the mundane grittiness of the concrete underpass or the wet tarmac street, but it also has similarities with the surreal satirical works of Will Self, and the reality-questioning works of Cartesian doubt for which Philip K. Dick was so well known. Indeed, Burr is a well-known admirer of Dick's work having written a piece about him for The Guardian newspaper in 1995.

In an interview with The Short Review, he stated that he was currently working on his first novel and "a collection of two novellas and a short story - all criticising certain aspects of contemporary life in Britain." He recently had flash fiction shortlisted for the 2017 Worcestershire Litfest and Fringe Flash Fiction competition.
