= Walter Bradick =

Walter Bradick (1706–1794), was a merchant at Lisbon.

Bradick was ruined by the earthquake which destroyed that city in 1755. Returning to England he had the further misfortune to lose his eyesight, and in 1774, on the nomination of the queen, he was admitted to The Charterhouse, where he died on 19 December 1794. He published, 1765, Choheleth, or the Royal Preacher, a poem, and he was the author of 'several detached publications.' A contemporary record of his death affirms that Choheleth "will be a lasting testimony to his abilities".
