= Polly Courtney =

English author and media commentator

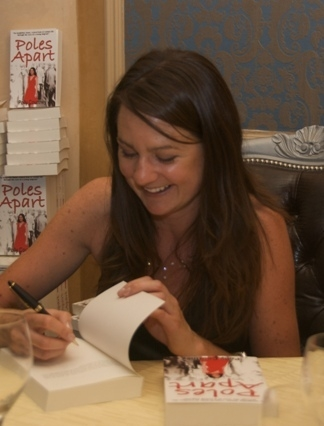
- Courtney signing copies of Poles Apart at its launch party in 2008
- Born: 1980 or 1981 (age 45–46)
- Occupation: Writer
- Writing career
- Period: (2005–present)
- Website: pollycourtney.com

Polly Courtney (born 1980 or 1981) is an English author and media commentator. She is best known as the author of the novels Golden Handcuffs and Poles Apart.

== Background ==
In her early years, Courtney was a straight-A student who spent her free time playing a multitude of sports and playing violin with various orchestras and string quartets. She grew up in London. Courtney graduated from the University of Cambridge with a first-class degree in mechanical engineering, and worked in investment banking for two years before resigning to spend time writing her first novel based on her experiences in the City. In an interview, she claimed this was due to the strenuous hours and pressures synonymous with the banking culture.

== Fiction ==
Courtney has written a number of novels. Her early novels, Golden Handcuffs and Poles Apart, were self-published, based on her experiences as an investment banker and the story of a Polish migrant acquaintance. Her publishing success earned her a three-book publishing deal with HarperCollins imprint, Avon. At the release of It's a Man's World in 2011, Courtney announced plans to return to self-publishing because she did not agree with the chick lit marketing approach used by HarperCollins. On returning to self-publishing, Courtney said in an interview that she was pleased to have regained control. Feral Youth (2013) is based on Courtney's experiences of the London riots and her concerns that more unrest would be only a matter of time.

== Bibliography ==
- Golden Handcuffs (2007)
- Poles Apart (2008)
- The Day I Died (2009)
- Defying Gravity (2010)
- The Fame Factor (2010)
- It's a Man's World (2011)
- Feral Youth (2013)

== Non-fiction ==
Courtney has written commentary pieces on city culture, women in the workplace, Polish migrants, lad mags, sexism in publishing and youth discontentment for The Observer, The Guardian, The Independent, The Sunday Times, the Evening Standard, Female First, Grazia and Huffington Post.
