= Walter Davison =

English poet

- Born: 17 December 1581; London, UK
- Died: 1608 (aged 27)
- Occupation: English Poet

Walter Davison (17 December 1581, London – 1608?) was an English poet.

== Life ==
Davison was the fourth and youngest son of William Davison, secretary of state, and his wife Catharine, daughter of Francis Spelman. He was a fellow-commoner of King's College, Cambridge, in 1596, but he left the university without taking a degree. About 1602 he was a soldier in the Low Countries. As he is not mentioned in his father's will, dated 18 December 1608, it is likely that he was then dead.

He was the author of eighteen of the poems in the first edition of the Poetical Rhapsody, 1602, the poetical collection compiled by his brother Francis. At the time these poems were composed he was under eighteen years of age. "Seventeen of these comprise a competent but unmemorable sequence of amatory poems; the last is a translation from the Latin of a misogynistic epigram."
