= Percy Addleshaw =

English journalist

Title page from Happy Wanderer (1896)

Percy Addleshaw (1866 in Bowdon, Cheshire – 1916) was an English barrister and writer.

A graduate of Christ Church, Oxford, Addleshaw was called to the bar in 1893. He was an admirer and friend of Roden Noel. He wrote articles, poems and reviews for various publications and, under the pseudonym of Percy Hemingway published Out of Egypt, a volume of short stories (1894) and The Happy Wanderer and other verse. In 1920 a posthumous collection of verse was published with a lengthy introduction by Arundel Osborne, titled Last Verses.

== Bibliography ==
- 1896 - The happy wanderer & other verse
- 1912 - The cathedral church of Exeter. A description of its fabric and a brief history of the epispocal see
- 1916 - Sir Philip Sidney
