= A Poetical Rhapsody =

A Poetical Rhapsody (original spelling: A Poetical Rapsodie) is an Elizabethan verse miscellany compiled by Francis Davison with contributions by an unidentified ‘A. W.’ which went through four editions: 1602, 1608, 1611, and 1621.

The Poetical Rapsodie includes a version text of the Harefield Entertainment which had previously circulated in manuscript.
