= Francis Davison (poet) =

Francis Davison (c. 1575–1616) was an English lawyer, poet and anthologist. He was made a member of Gray's Inn in 1593; travelled in Italy in 1595; contributed some of its best poems to A Poetical Rapsody in 1602; and left in manuscript metrical translations from the Psalms, Tabula Analytlca Poetica, and some historical pamphlets.

== Early life and travels ==
Francis Davison, eldest son of William Davison, secretary of state to Queen Elizabeth I, was born about 1575. His mother was Catherine, only daughter of Francis Spelman, younger son of William Spelman, esq., of Norfolk. He was admitted in 1593 a member of Gray's Inn, and in December 1594 he was among the contributors to the Gray's Inn Masque, for which he wrote some speeches. In May 1595, accompanied by his tutor, Edward Smyth, he started on his travels. The queen's license (dated 27 May 1595) permitting him to go abroad is preserved in Harleian MS. 38, f. 188. In the following January Smyth wrote from Venice to Mr. Secretary Davison protesting that the allowance of ‘100l. yearly for our expences’ was inadequate, and three weeks afterwards he sent another letter, in which he declared that his pupil was ‘not so easily ruled touching expences, about which we have had more brabblements than I will now speak of, … and if somewhat be not amended I hope I shall have leave to return.’ The travellers were at Florence in the autumn of 1596. Anthony Bacon (brother of Francis) wrote to Davison at Florence highly commending a Relation of Saxony which Davison had composed abroad. This Relation was stolen from the Earl of Essex's house some time in 1596, and is supposed to have perished. Some interesting letters written by Davison from Italy to his father and to Anthony Bacon are extant among the Harleian MSS., and have been printed by Sir Harris Nicolas. From these letters it appears that he was anxious to gain the favour of the Earl of Essex, who in January 1596–7 sent him a friendly letter of counsel and encouragement.

== Literary works ==
It is probable that Davison returned to England at the close of 1597. In 1600 he wrote an Answer to Mrs. Mary Cornwallis, pretended Countess of Cumberland; being a Defense of the Marriage of William Bourchier, third Earl of Bath, with Elizabeth Russell, daughter of Francis, Earl of Bedford. Portions of this tract, which seems to have been written without any view to publication, are preserved in Harleian MS. 249. In the introduction Davison mentions that he was "specially obliged" to the Russell family. In 1602 appeared the first edition of A Poetical Rapsody, containing Diuerse Sonnets, Odes, Elegies, Madrigalls, and other Poesies, both in Rime and Measured Verse. Neuer yet published.

The Bee and Spider, by a diuerse power,
Sucke Hony and Poyson from the selfe same flower,

Many of the choicest poems in this collection were written by the editor, Francis Davison, and there are some pieces by his brother Walter. In his address to the reader Davison states that his own poems "were made, most of them six or seven years since, at idle times, as I journeyed up and down during my travels", and that his brother Walter, who was by profession a soldier, "was not eighteen years old when he writ these toyes". Chamberlain, in a letter to Dudley Carleton dated 8 July 1602, notices the appearance of the anthology: "It seems young Davison means to take another course, and turn poet, for he hath lately set out certain sonnets and epigrams".

The only known copy (and that imperfect) of the first edition is preserved in the Bodleian Library. A second edition, enlarged, was issued in 1608, another edition, again enlarged, in 1611, and the fourth edition in 1621. The Rapsody was edited by Egerton Brydges in 1814, and by Nicholas Harris Nicolas in 1826. Collier reprinted the first edition (1602) in Seven English Poetical Miscellanies (1867). At the close of the address to the reader Davison announced that he hoped to publish before long "some graver work". He may have been referring to his metrical translations from the Psalms. These translations, which have considerable merit, were not published during Davison's lifetime; but they are extant in manuscript (Harleian MSS. 3357, 6930), and have been printed by Brydges and by Nicolas.

== Death and manuscripts ==
William Davison died in December 1608, and by his will left his son Francis 100l. per annum from the profits of the office of custos brevium of the queen's bench. It is probable that Francis Davison died in or before 1619; for in that year many of his manuscripts, together with papers of William Davison, were in the possession of Ralph Starkey. These manuscripts afterwards came into the possession of Sir Simon D'Ewes, and are now preserved among the Harleian MSS. One interesting and tantalising article is a long list (Harleian MS. 280, f. 102) in Davison's handwriting of poems written by a mysterious ‘A. W.,’ who was one of the chief contributors to the Rapsody. Among other articles attributed to Davison by Nicolas are:

1. Notes for a projected work entitled A Relation of England (Harleian MS. 304, f. 79);
2. That the Lord-treasurer Burleigh endeavoured to suppress and keep down Mr. Secretary Davison (Harleian MS. 290, f. 237);
3. The Cypher used by Secretary Davison (Harleian MS. 291, f. 84);
4. Tabula Analytica Poetica (Harleian MS. 588, f. 3).

J. P. Collier possessed a unique collection of Latin anagrams by Davison, broadside, folio, 1603.

== Bibliography ==
- Memoir by Sir Harris Nicolas, prefixed to the Poetical Rhapsody (1826);
- Corser's Collectanea;
- Hazlitt's Handbook of Bibliography;
- Hunter's Chorus Vatum;
- Sale Catalogue of J. P. Collier's Library, No. 712;
- Collier's Bibliographical Catalogue.
