= List of people from Bath =

This article provides a non-exhaustive list of famous people born, educated or prominent in Bath, Somerset, England, or otherwise associated with it. The sections and the names in each section are alphabetical. Bathonian describes a person who comes from Bath.

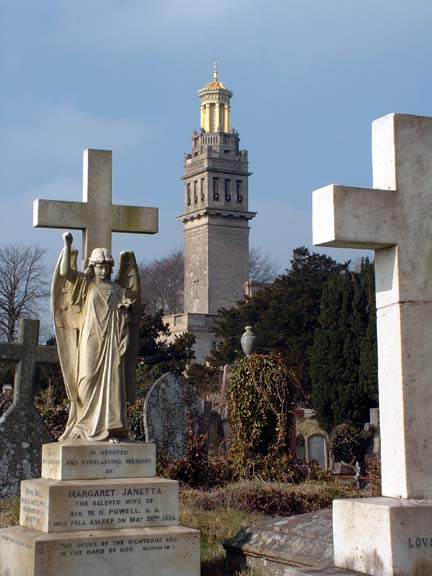
Beckford's Tower on Lansdown Hill

== Acting ==
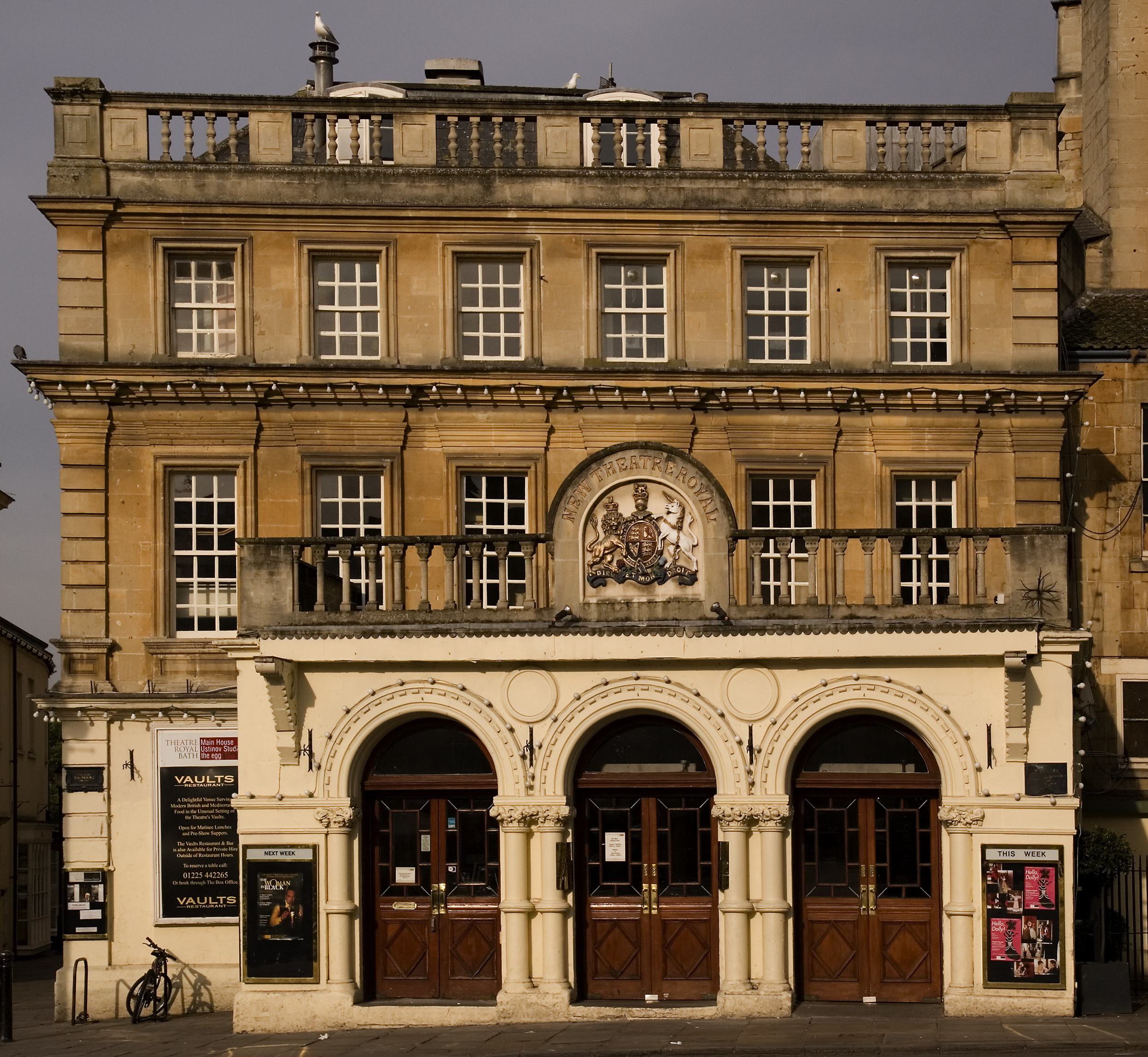
Theatre Royal, Bath

- Ann Street Barry (1734–1801), singer, dancer and stage actress.
- George Bartley (1782?–1858), stage comedian.
- Paul Bedford (1792?–1871), comedian.
- Jennifer Biddall (born 1980), actress who played Jessica Harris in Hollyoaks.
- Patricia Brake (1942–2022), actress in Porridge, and Going Straight
- Adam Campbell (born 1980), actor in Epic Movie and Date Movie.
- Julia Davis (born 1966), actress, comedian, director and writer.
- Henry Gattie (1774–1844), actor and singer.
- Michael Gwynn (1916–1976), actor
- Anthony Head (1954-2026), actor, singer and performer in musical theatre.
- Jonathan Hyde (born 1948), Australian-English actor.
- Kym Jackson (born 1981), Australian actress and author.
- Andrew Lincoln (born 1973), actor, brought up in Bath.
- Jonathan Lynn (born 1943), actor, writer and director.
- Angelica Mandy (living), actress in Vanity Fair, and in the Harry Potter series as Gabrielle Delacour
- Leo McKern (1920–2002), actor in Rumpole
- Tom Payne (born 1982), actor.
- Arnold Ridley (1896–1984), playwright and actor.
- Sarah Siddons (1755–1831), actress
- Daniel Terry (1780?–1829), actor and playwright.
- Indira Varma (born 1973), actress.
- Harriet Waylett (1798–1851), actress and theatre manager.
- Benjamin Nottingham Webster (1797–1882), actor-manager and dramatist.
- Sarah West (1790–1876), actress.

== Architecture ==
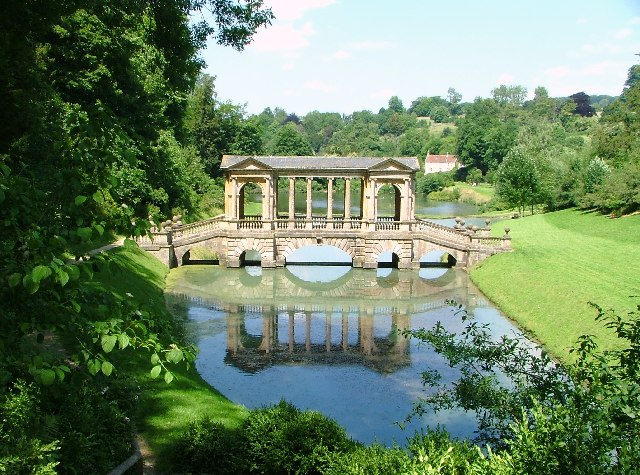
The Palladian Bridge, Prior Park Gardens

- Robert Adam (1728–1792) – architect of Pulteney Bridge, also produced unbuilt designs for the Assembly Rooms and Bathwick estate.
- Thomas Baldwin (c. 1750–1820) – architect of Great Pulteney Street and Bath Guildhall.
- Sir Reginald Blomfield (1856–1942) – architect of the Bath War Memorial and extension of the Holbourne Museum.
- Thomas Fuller (1823–1898) – emigrated to Canada, where he co-designed the Parliament House in Ottawa.
- Frederick Gibberd (1908–1984) – architect of Bath Technical College.
- Henry Goodridge (1797–1864) – architect of Beckford's Tower, Cleveland Bridge and The Corridor shopping arcade
- Sir Thomas Graham Jackson (1835–1924) – architect of the World War I memorial aisle Bath Abbey.
- Charles Harcourt Masters (born 1759) – active in Bathwick including Sydney Gardens.
- William Eden Nesfield (1835–1888) – architect, one of the leaders of the Gothic revival in England.
- John Palmer (c. 1738–1817) – architect of the Pump Room and Lansdown Crescent.
- Charles J. Phipps (1835–1897) – Theatre Royal, Bath and other theatres around Britain.
- John Pinch the Elder (1769–1827) – the original Royal United Hospital
- John Pinch the Younger (1796–1849) – architect
- George Gilbert Scott (1811–1878) – restoration of Bath Abbey, architect of St Andrew's church destroyed by World War II bombing
- Frederick William Stevens (1847–1900) – architect, emigrated to India.
- John Wood, the Elder (1704–1754) – architect of Queen Square and the Circus.
- John Wood, the Younger (1728–1772) – architect of the Royal Crescent.

== Arts ==
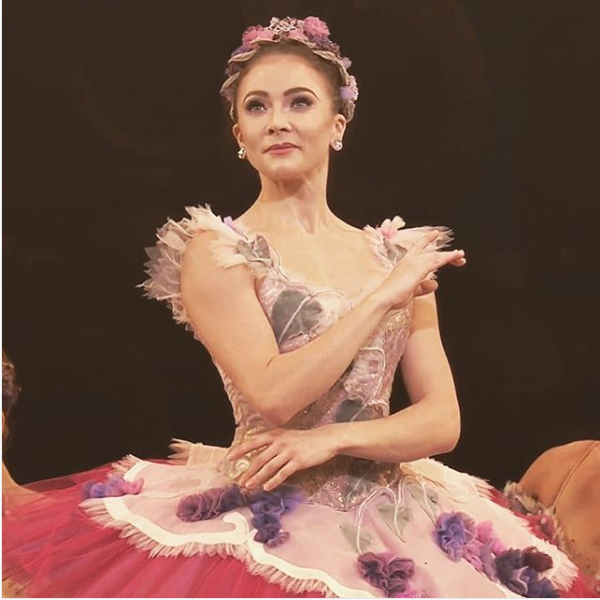
Claire Calvert in Sleeping Beauty, Royal Opera House, 2017

- Roy Ascott (born 1934), new media artist
- Daniel A. Baker (living), artist and producer of alternative comics.
- Thomas Jones Barker (1813–1882), historical, military and portrait painter.
- Thomas Haynes Bayly (1797–1839), poet, songwriter, dramatist and writer.
- Manolo Blahnik (born 1942), shoe designer
- Sir Peter Blake (born 1932) lived in Wellow village, near Bath, in the 1970s.
- Peter Brown (born 1967), painter
- Claire Calvert (born 1988), first soloist ballet dancer at The Royal Ballet
- William Duffield (1816–1863), still-life painter.
- Thomas Gainsborough (1727–1788), painter
- Heywood Hardy (1842–1933), painter
- Thomas Lawrence (1769–1830), painter
- Edwin Long (1829–1891), genre, history, biblical and portrait painter.
- Willis Maddox (1813–1853), painter.
- Kayleigh Pearson (born 1985), glamour model
- John Robinson (1715–1745), portrait-painter.
- John Sanders (1750–1825), painter.
- Albert Way (1805–1874), an antiquary, and principal founder of the Royal Archaeological Institute.
- HAUI (born 1990), multidisciplinary artist

== Education ==
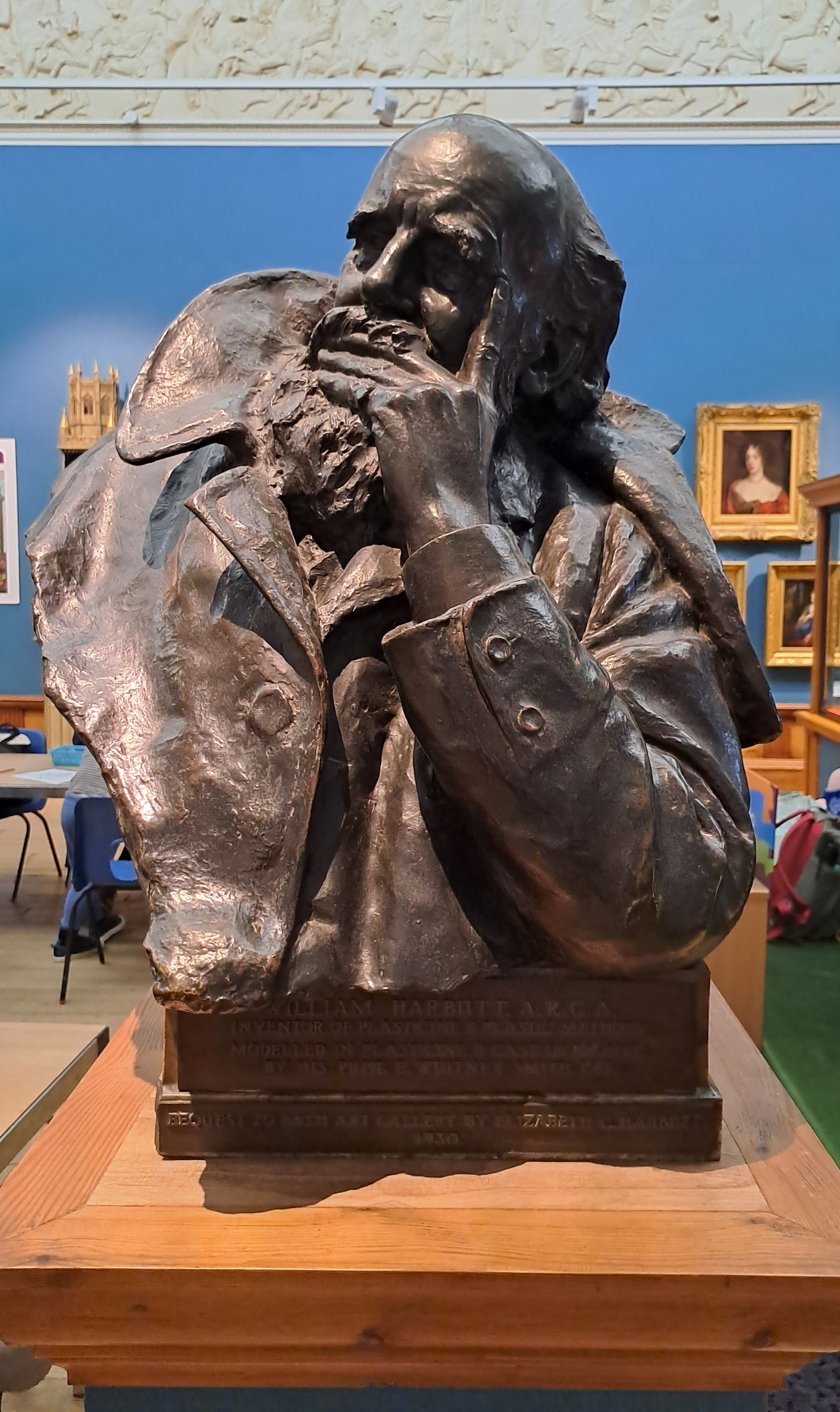
Sculpture of William Harbutt in Victoria Gallery, Bath

- Marie Bethell Beauclerc (1845–1897) – England's first female shorthand teacher
- Raymond Carr (1919–2015) – historian
- William Harbutt (1844–1921) – headmaster and inventor of plasticine
- Roderick Kedward (born 1937) – historian
- Edward Vansittart Neale (1810–1892) – barrister, cooperator, and Christian socialist.
- Isaac Pitman (1813–1897) – inventor of shorthand

== Exiles ==
- Haile Selassie I (1892–1975) – during World War II
- Louis XVIII (1755–1824) – before ascending the French throne

== Film and TV ==
- Bill Bailey (born 1965) – comedian, musician, actor, TV and radio presenter and author
- Jesse Honey (born 1977) – BBC Mastermind champion 2010
- Russell Howard (born 1980) – comedian, TV presenter and actor
- David Lassman (living) – screenwriter
- Ken Loach (born 1936) – film director
- Charlotte McDonnell (born 1990) – YouTuber, filmmaker and screenwriter
- David Robinson (born 1930) – film critic and author, official biographer of Charlie Chaplin, lives in Bath.

== Literature ==
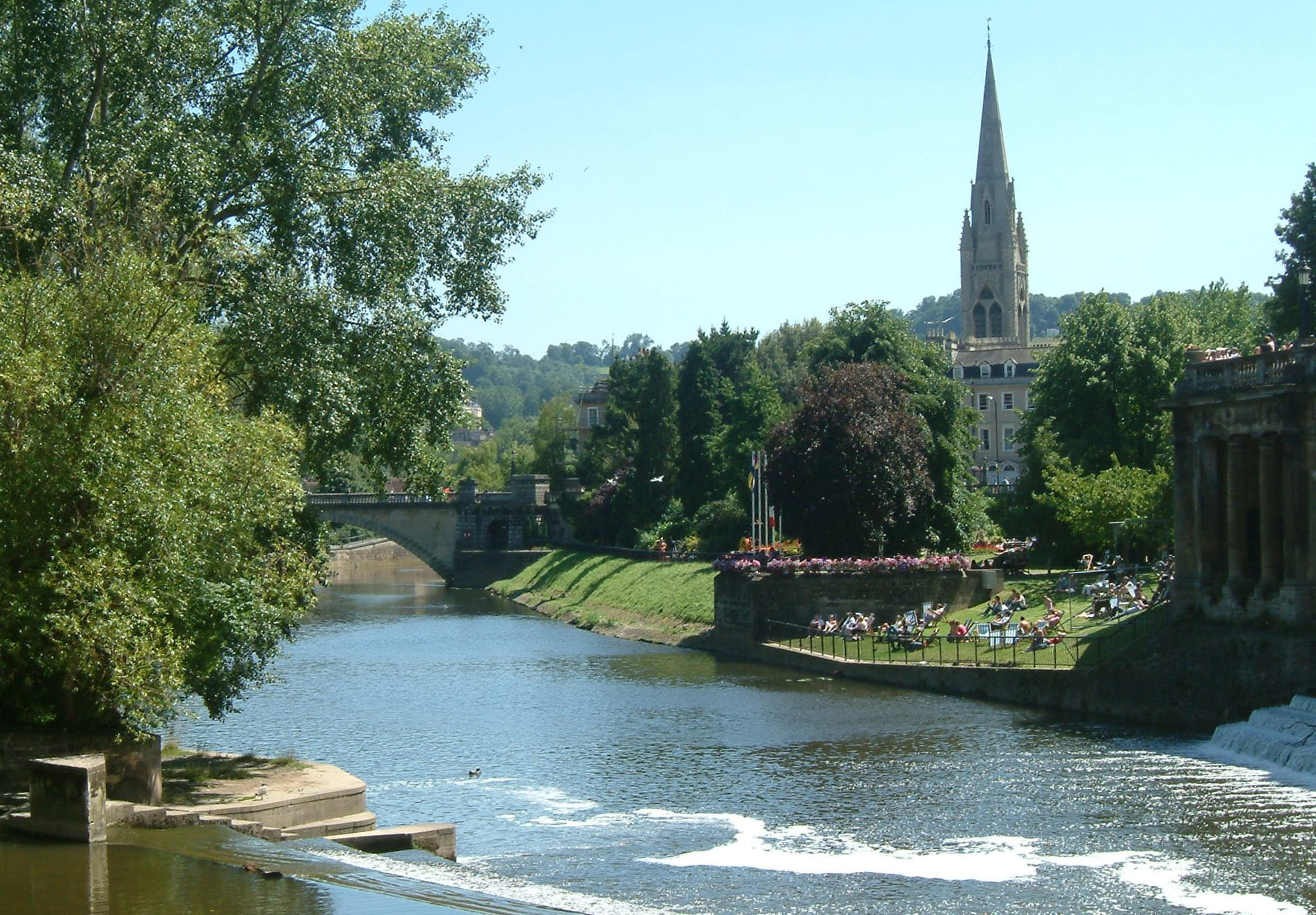
Looking south from the Pulteney Bridge in Bath

- Jane Austen (1775–1817) – novelist: Joan Aiken reports that Austen did not love the city: when she learnt her family were moving to Bath "she fainted dead away."
- Thomas Haynes Bayly (1797–1839) – poet, songwriter, dramatist and writer.
- William Beckford (1760–1844) – wrote Vathek and a series of works on travel.
- Henrietta Maria Bowdler (1750–1830) – novelist and editor.
- Jane Bowdler (1743–1784) – poet and essayist, was born and died at Ashley.
- John Bowdler (1746–1823) – moral reformer and religious writer.
- Thomas Bowdler (1754–1825) – physician and expurgator of Shakespeare.
- Angela Carter (1940–1992) – novelist who lived in Bath in the early 1970s.
- John Collins (1742–1808), an entertainer and poet.
- Charles Dickens (1812–1870) – novelist and frequent visitor to Bath, who set much of the Pickwick Papers there
- Richard Lovell Edgeworth (1744–1817) – an Anglo-Irish politician, writer and inventor.
- Henry Fielding (1707–1754) – novelist
- Prince Hoare (1755–1834), painter, art critic, dramatist and librettist.
- William Hone (1780–1842) – writer, satirist and bookseller.
- Eliza Humphreys (1850–1938) – known as "Rita", wrote A Grey Life, a novel set in Bath. She lived at Combe Down from about 1923 and is buried in Bath Abbey Cemetery.
- Morag Joss (born 1955) – novelist
- David Lassman (living) – novelist born in Bath, co-author of the Regency Detective series
- Robert Montgomery – poet and minister.
- Mary Shelley (1797–1851) – novelist, author of Frankenstein; or, The Modern Prometheus.
- Richard Brinsley Sheridan (1751–1816) – playwright
- Tobias Smollett (1721–1771) – physician, surgeon and novelist, who partly set The Expedition of Humphry Clinker in the city and wrote an essay on the Bath waters.
- Richard Tickell (1751–1793), playwright and satirist.
- Geoffrey Trease (1909–1998) – children's novelist, author of the Bannermere series
- Horace Twiss (1787–1849) – English writer and politician.
- Jacqueline Wilson (born 1945) – children's author born in Bath

== Military ==
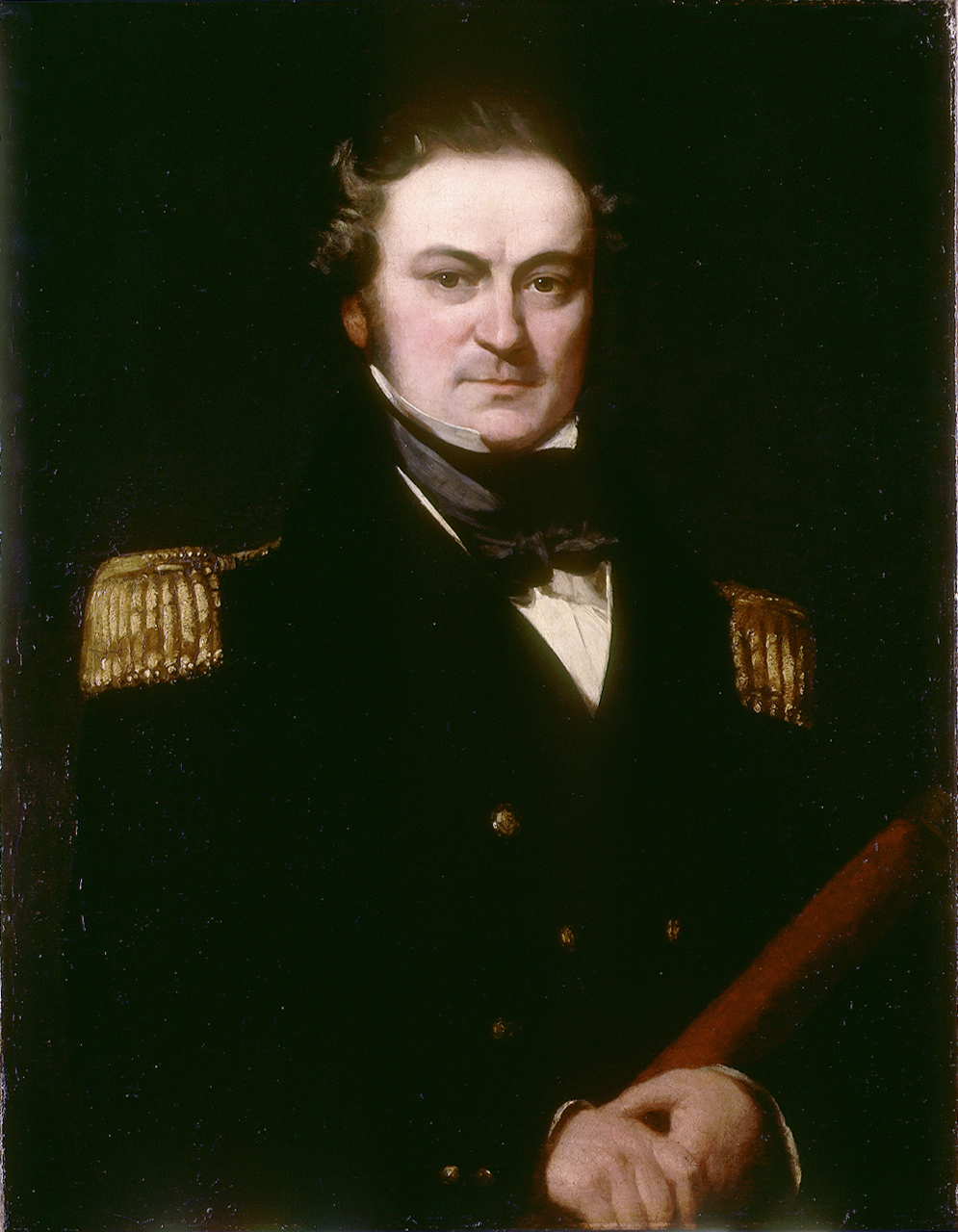
William Edward Parry ca.1830

- General Sir Alfred Horsford (1816–1885), a senior Army officer and Military Secretary.
- Lieutenant-General Sir Edward Macarthur (1789–1872), lieutenant-general in the British Army, Commander-in-chief in Australia.
- Horatio Nelson, 1st Viscount Nelson (1758–1805) – admiral, freeman of Bath.
- William Edward Parry (1790–1855) – rear-admiral and Arctic explorer.
- Harry Patch (1898–2009) – supercentenarian and last trench veteran of World War I, lived in Combe Down.
- George Wade (1673–1748) – field marshal and MP for Bath 1722
- James Wolfe (1727–1759) – major general

== Music ==
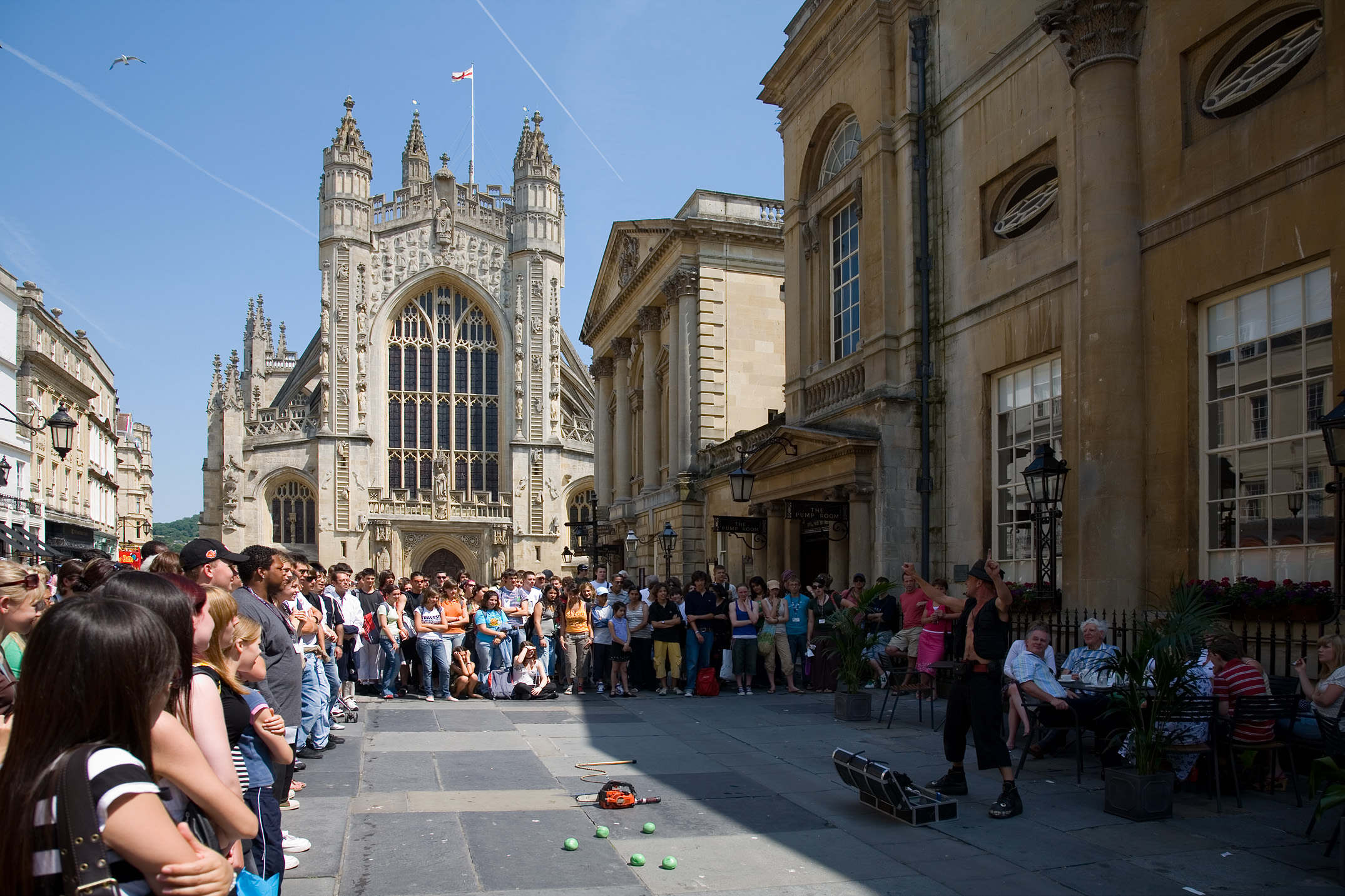
Street performance near Bath Abbey

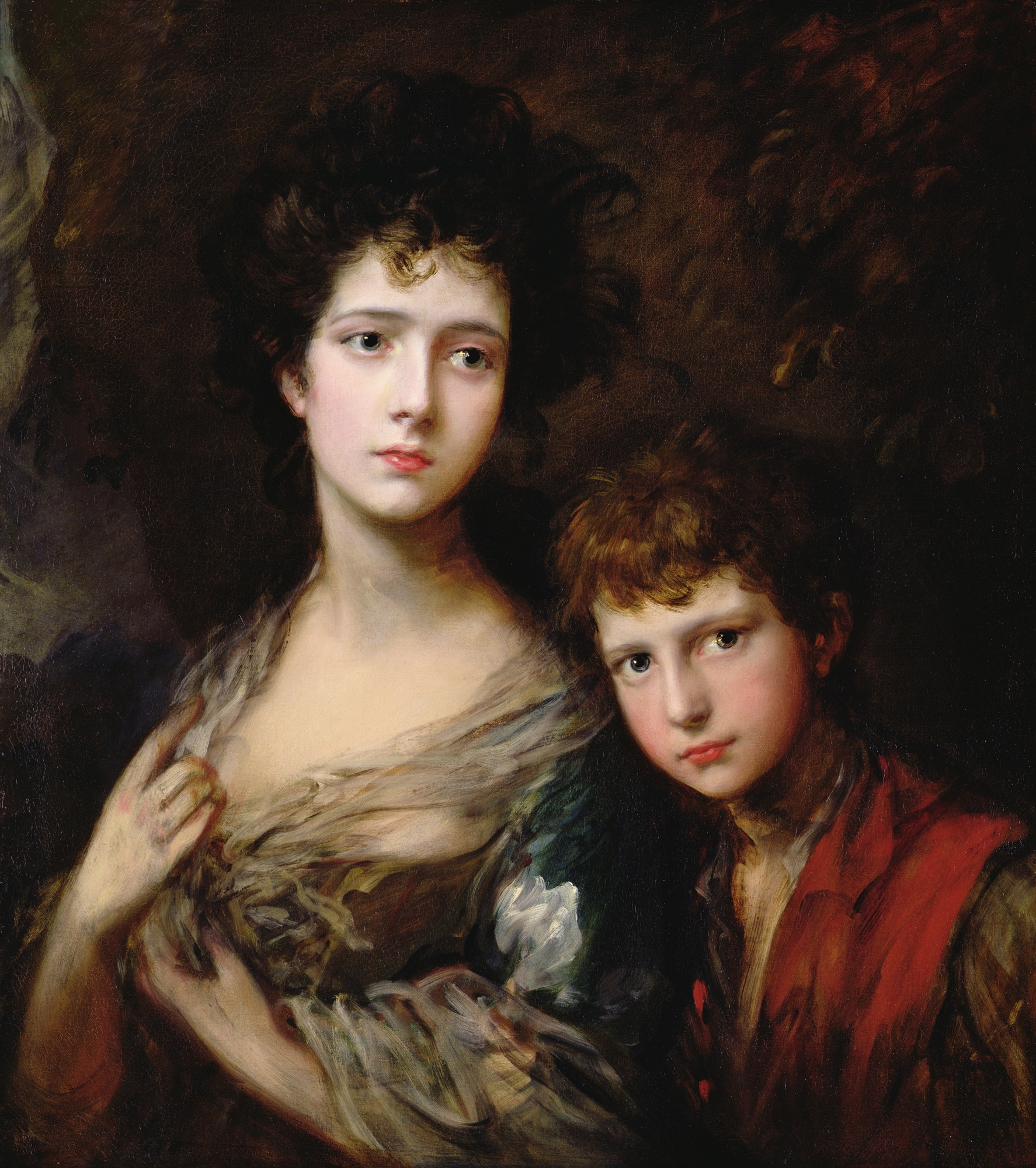
Elizabeth and Thomas Linley, 1768 by Thomas Gainsborough

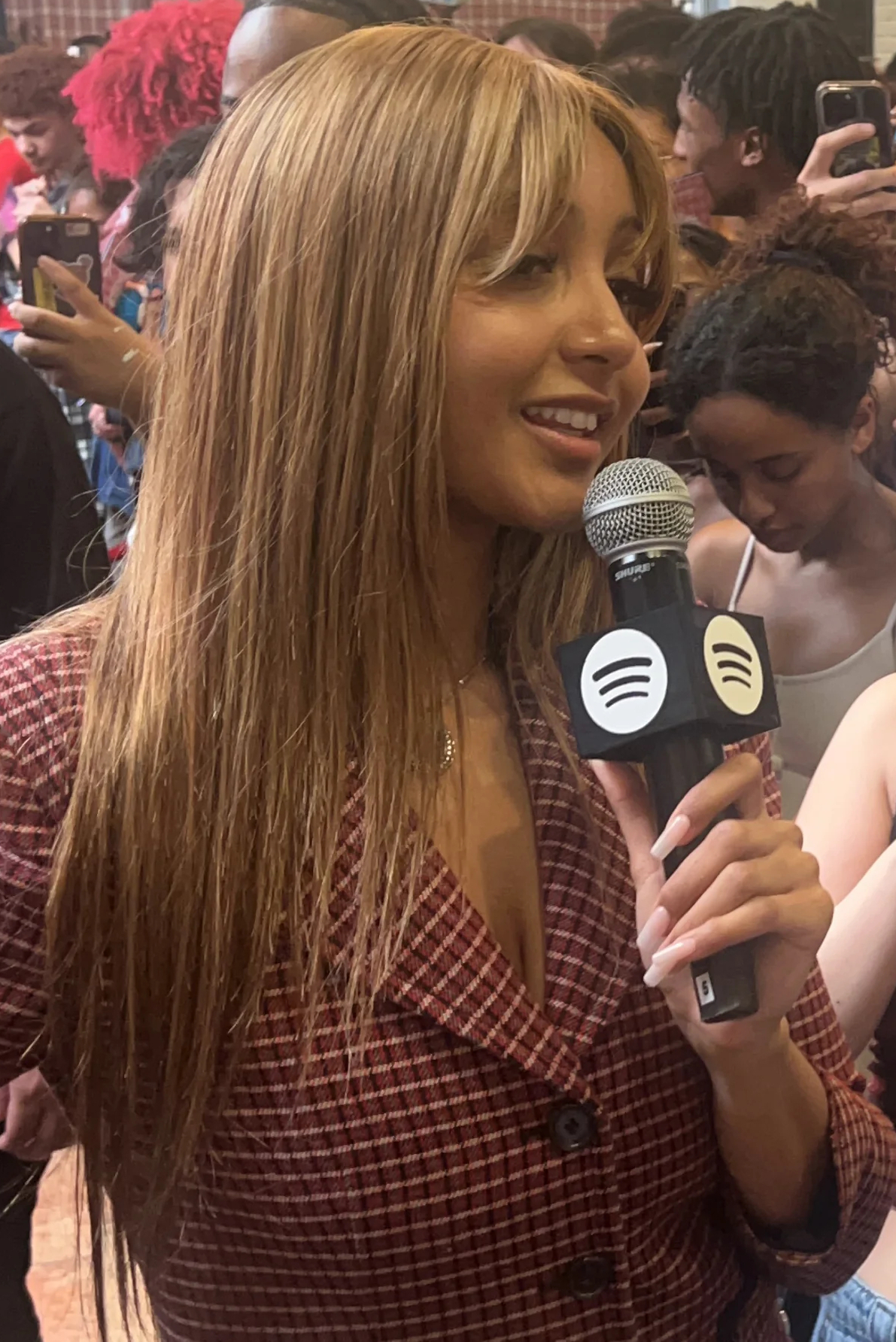
- PinkPantheress at the Spotify Awards in 2025
  Lucy Anderson (bap. 1795–1878), pianist.
- Gabrielle Aplin (born 1992) – singer-songwriter
- Danny Byrd (born 1979) – drum and bass producer with Hospital Records
- Eddie Cochran (1938–1960) – rock and roll musician who died in Bath
- The Family Rain (formed in 2011) – blues rock band
- Henry Ibbot Field (1797–1848), a classical pianist who also played Bath Abbey organ.
- Fred V & Grafix – drum and bass production duo educated at Bath Spa University
- Peter Gabriel (born 1950) – singer, songwriter, and musician.
- Interview (1977–1981) – New wave band
- Alison Goldfrapp (born 1966) – singer of Goldfrapp
- Peter Hammill (born 1948) – singer-songwriter
- Raymond Leppard (1927–2019) – conductor, educated Beechen Cliff School
- Naked Eyes (formed 1982) – new wave musical group
- Elizabeth Ann Linley (1754–1792), singer, often painted by Thomas Gainsborough
- Mary Linley (1758–1787), singer, daughter of Thomas Linley the elder.
- Thomas Linley the elder (1733–1795) – bass and musician
- Thomas Linley the younger (1756–1778), a precocious composer, violinist and performer.
- William Linley (1771–1835), author and musical composer.
- Edward Loder (1809–1865), composer and conductor.
- George Loder (1816–1868), conductor and composer of orchestral music, operas and songs.
- John David Loder (1788–1846), violinist, later a professor of the violin.
- PinkPantheress (born 2001) singer-songwriter and record producer.
- Propellerheads (formed in 1995) – electronic music duo
- Peter Salisbury (born 1971) – drummer and percussionist of The Verve
- Alberto Semprini (1908–1990) – pianist
- Innes Sibun (born 1968) – blues singer, guitarist and songwriter
- Frank Tapp (1883–1953), composer, pianist and conductor
- Tears for Fears (formed 1981) – new wave musical group
- Midge Ure (born 1953), singer-songwriter and record producer.
- William Litton Viner (1790–1867), an organist and composer of church music.
- Calico (formed 2024), an independent band.

== Public service ==
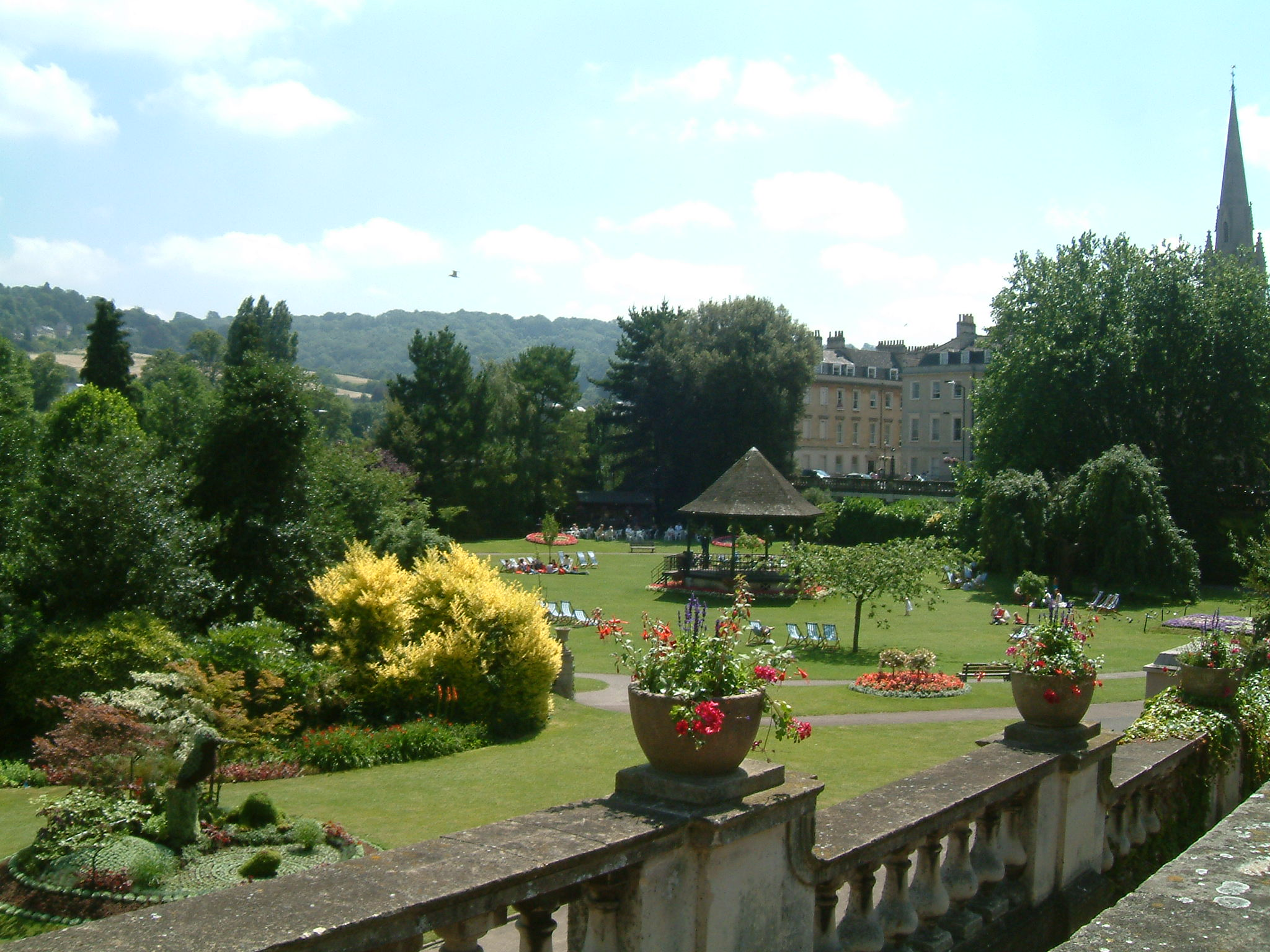
The Parade Gardens

- Ralph Allen (1693–1764) – postal reformer, quarrier and mayor, who set up the first nationwide cross-country postal network
- Sir Henry Cole (1808–1882) – civil servant.
- John Ford Davis (1773-1864), physician and mayor of Bath in 1830.
- Don Foster (born 1947) – MP for Bath, 1992–2015
- Beau Nash (1674–1761) – master of ceremonies in Georgian Bath
- John Palmer (1742–1818) – inventor of a lightweight mail coach
- Chris Patten – MP for Bath 1979–1992, then Governor of Hong Kong 1992–1997
- William Pitt, 1st Earl of Chatham (1708–1788) – Prime Minister and MP for Bath, 1757–1766
- William Pitt the Younger (1759–1806) – Prime Minister
- Sir William Tite (1798–1873) – architect and MP for Bath, 1855–1873
- Edward Vansittart Neale (1810–1892), barrister, cooperator, and Christian socialist.

== Religion ==
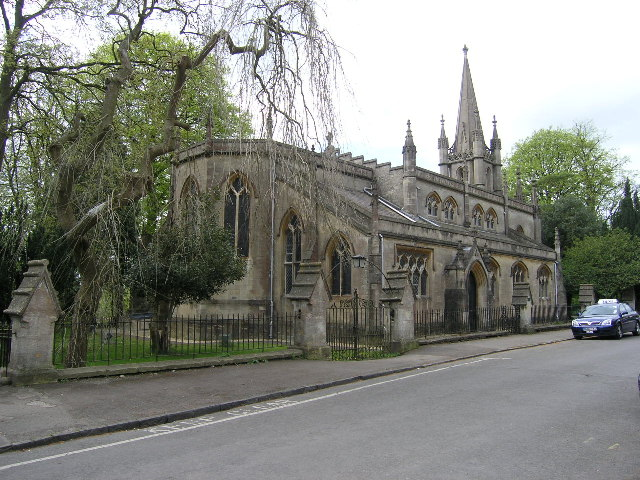
Holy Trinity Church, Combe Down

- Joseph Brown (1796–1880), a bishop of the Roman Catholic Church.
- Louisa Daniell (1809–1871) – evangelical philanthropist and missionary
- Thomas Grinfield (1788–1870), clergyman and hymn-writer.
- John Hales (1584–1656) – cleric, theologian and writer.
- Edward Hawkins (1789–1882), churchman and academic, Provost of Oriel College, Oxford.
- William Jay (1769–1853) – preacher
- Oliver King (c. 1432–1503) – Bishop of Bath and Wells, set up rebuilding of Bath Abbey
- Richard Laurence (1760–1838), Hebraist and Anglican churchman, Archbishop of Cashel.
- Abraham Marchant (1816–1881) – early Mormon leader, settler of Kamas, Utah

== Royalty ==
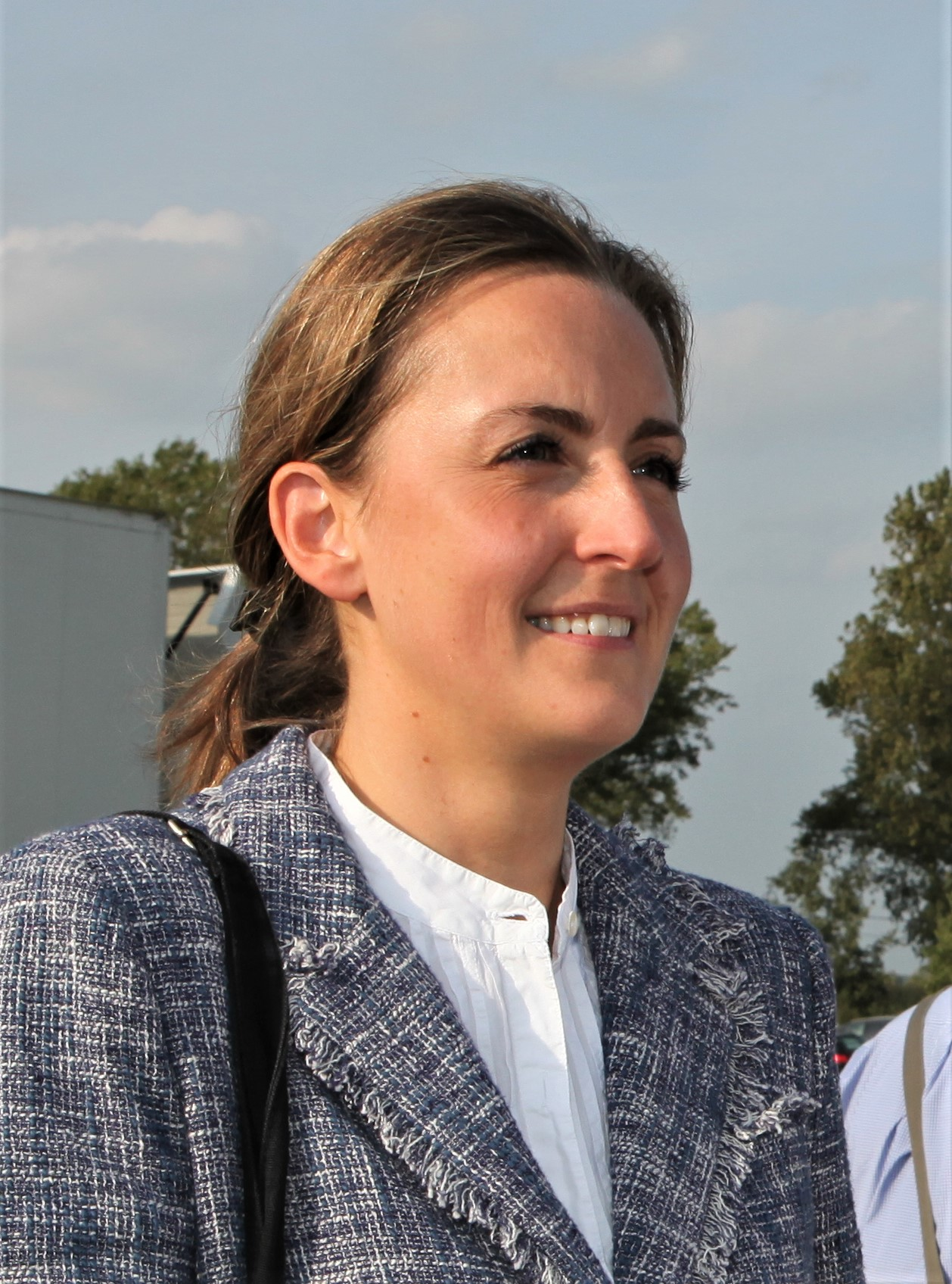
Princess Claire of Belgium, 2011

- Queen Anne (1665–1714) – visited for treatment of gout.
- Princess Claire of Belgium (born 1974) – born in Bath
- Edgar of England (c. 943–975) – crowned king of England in Bath Abbey in 973
- Queen Elizabeth I (1533–1603) – on a visit, ordered the restoration of Bath Abbey
- Mary of Modena (1658–1718) – came for treatment for infertility. After Prince James Francis Edward Stuart was born, she paid for a cross to be raised in what became Cross Baths.
- Queen Victoria (1819–1901) – still a princess, stayed and opened Royal Victoria Park.

== Science ==
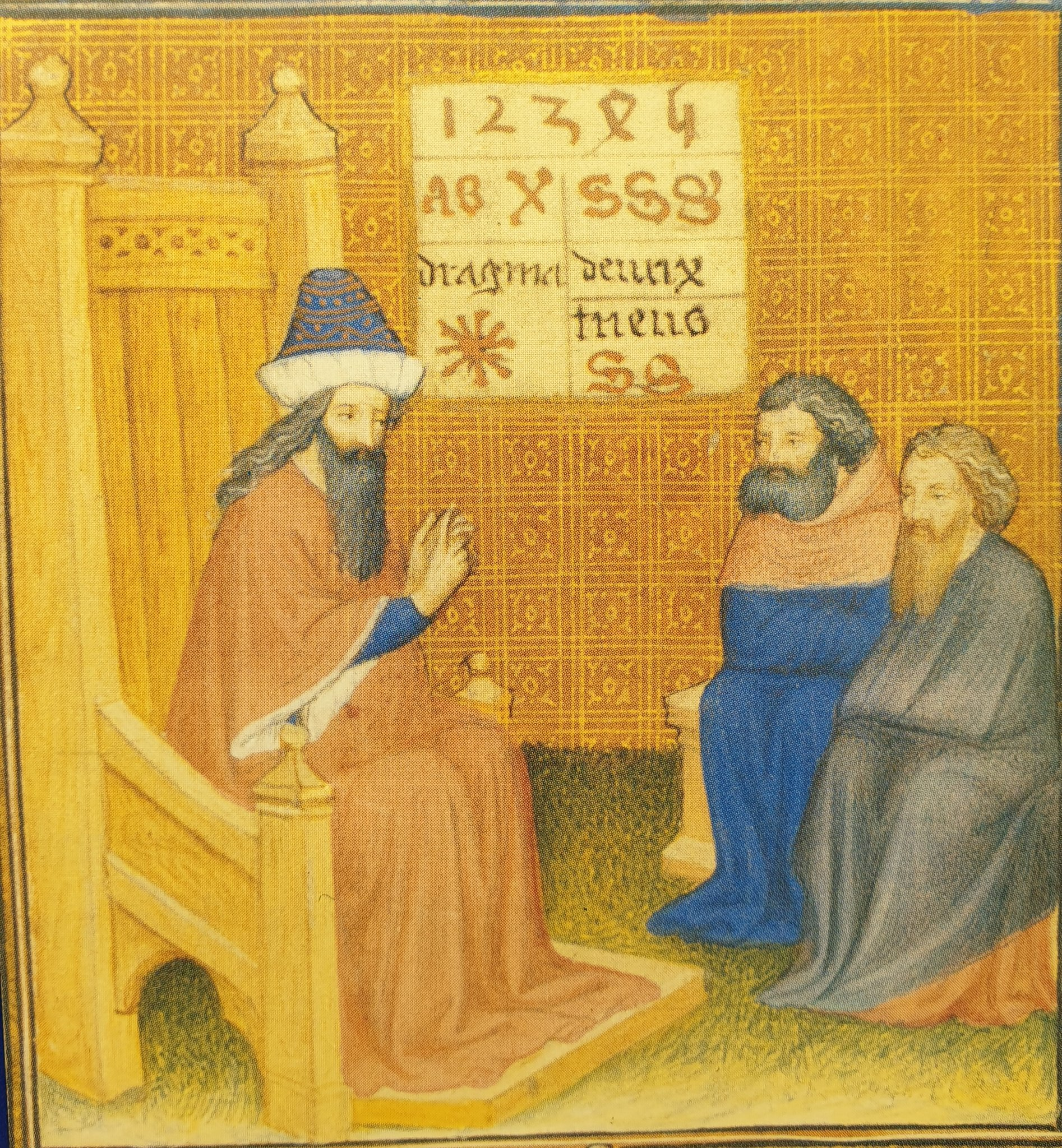
Adelard of Bath, (teaching)

- Benjamin Baker (1840–1907), civil engineer.
- Adelard of Bath (c. 1080 – c. 1152) – astronomer, philosopher and mathematician
- Adela Breton (1849–1923) – artist and archaeologist, recorded Mexican frescoes in the 1890s.
- Mike Cowlishaw (living) – computer scientist and engineer
- Richard Lovell Edgeworth (1744–1817) – writer and inventor
- Robert Leslie Ellis (1817-1859), polymath and principally a mathematician.
- David Hartley (the Younger) (1732–1813) – philosopher and inventor
- Caroline Herschel (1750–1848) – astronomer who discovered several comets.
- William Herschel (1738–1822) – astronomer, discoverer of Uranus and musician
- Aylmer Bourke Lambert (1761–1842), botanist, fellow of the Linnean Society.
- William Lonsdale (1794–1871) – English geologist and palaeontologist.
- Thomas Robert Malthus (1866–1934) – philosopher and economist
- Dr William Oliver (1695–1764) – a founder of the Royal Mineral Water Hospital and inventor of the Bath Oliver savoury biscuit.
- Charles Henry Parry (1779–1860), physician and writer.
- Percy Pilcher (1867–1899) – inventor and aviation pioneer
- Richard J. Roberts (born 1943) – Nobel Prize-winning biochemist
- Benjamin Robins (1707–1751) – scientist, Newtonian mathematician and military engineer.

== Sport ==
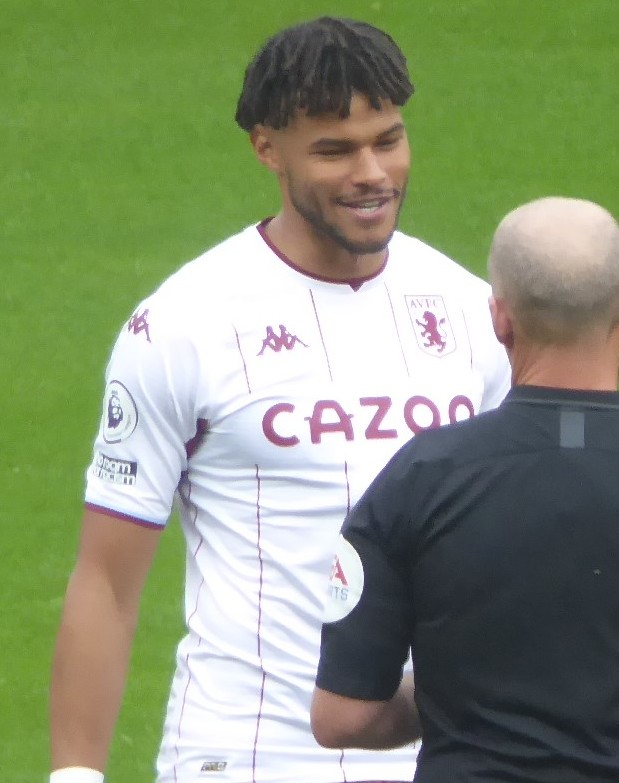
Tyrone Mings, 2021

- Xavier Amaechi (born 2001) – professional footballer.
- George Attfield (1826–1925) – county cricketer active in the 1840s and 1850s.
- Roger Bannister (1929–2018) – athlete, first man to run sub-four-minute mile
- Olly Barkley (born 1981) – England international rugby player
- Ashley Barnes (born 1989) – professional football player playing for Burnley F.C.
- Tony Book (born 1934) – football player, Manchester City captain and manager, one of a Bath-based Book footballing dynasty
- Jamie Chadwick (born 1998) – racing driver
- Jason Dodd (born 1970) – footballer, Southampton captain holding a record for most premiership appearances by player without being named in an England squad
- Jason Gardener (born 1975) – athlete, 4 × 100 m Olympic gold medallist
- Matt Green (born 1987) – professional footballer
- Mike Gregory (born 1987) – darts player, runner up at 1992 World Professional Darts Championship
- Jeremy Guscott (born 1965) – England and Bath rugby player
- Ed McKeever (born 1983) – kayak world champion (K1 200m)
- Tyrone Mings (born 1993) – professional footballer for Aston Villa F.C.
- Siobhan-Marie O'Connor (born 1995) – swimmer, silver medallist at the 2016 Olympic Games
- Andy Robinson (born 1964) – rugby coach, former England international team coach and Bath Rugby team coach
- Jack Rowell (born 1964) – Bath Rugby director, former England international team coach and Bath Rugby team coach
- Ben Rushgrove (born 1988) – paralympic athlete
- Anya Shrubsole (born 1991) – England cricketer
- Scott Sinclair (born 1989) – Bristol Rovers F.C. player
- Talan Skeels-Piggins (born 1970) – Paralympic alpine skier
- Corey Walkes (born 2001) – trampoline gymnast
- Amy Williams (born 1982) – winter Olympic gold medallist
- Clive Woodward (born 1956) – British Olympic Committee Director of Elite Performance, England international team coach and Bath Rugby team coach

== Freedom of the City ==
The following people and military units have received the Freedom of the City of Bath.

=== Individuals ===
- Prince George, Duke of Cambridge: 1897
- Donald Smith, 1st Baron Strathcona and Mount Royal: 13 July 1911
- Marquess of Bath: 20 June 1929
- Emperor of Ethiopia Haile Selassie: 18 October 1954
- Amy Williams: 5 June 2010
- Mary Berry: 7 June 2014

=== Military units ===
- 21st Signal Regiment (Air Support): November 2011
