= 1819 in the United Kingdom =

- Other years
- 1817 | 1818 | 1819 | 1820 | 1821
- Constituent countries of the United Kingdom
- England | Ireland | Scotland | Wales
- Sport
- 1819 English cricket season

Events from the year 1819 in the United Kingdom.

== Incumbents ==
- Monarch – George III
- Regent – George, Prince Regent
- Prime Minister – Robert Jenkinson, 2nd Earl of Liverpool (Tory)
- Foreign Secretary – Robert Stewart, Viscount Castlereagh
- Home Secretary – Lord Sidmouth
- Secretary of War – Lord Bathurst

== Events ==
- 6 February – Formal treaty between Sultan Hussein of Johor and the British Sir Stamford Raffles establishes a trading settlement in Singapore.
- 19 February – William Smith discovers the South Shetland Islands in the Antarctic.
- 20 March – Burlington Arcade opens in London.
- 13 April – The Mansfield and Pinxton Railway, a wagonway, opens for coal traffic.
- 14 April – The streets of Birmingham are lit by gas for the first time by the Birmingham Gas Light and Coke Company.
- 21 April–late May – John Keats writes "La Belle Dame sans Merci" and most of his major odes.
- 20 June – The SS Savannah, the first steamship to cross the Atlantic Ocean, arrives at Liverpool from Savannah, Georgia, United States, although only a fraction of the trip is made under steam.
- 22 June – Act of Parliament to abolish private appeals following acquittals in criminal cases and to abolish trial by combat, in the aftermath of Ashford v Thornton (1818).
- 2 July – Cotton Mills and Factories Act passed, a first attempt to regulate employment of young children in textile mills.
- 24 July – A cabinet meeting convened by Prime Minister Lord Liverpool discusses an investigative report of an adulterous affair involving Caroline of Brunswick (wife of the regent George, Prince of Wales) and her servant Bartolomeo Pergami; the cabinet concludes that the trial of Caroline for adultery would be an embarrassment to the nation.
- 16 August – Peterloo Massacre in St. Peter's Field, Manchester: a cavalry charge into a crowd of radical protesters results in eleven deaths and over 400 injuries.
- 19 September – Keats writes his ode "To Autumn" at Winchester.
- 23 November–30 December – Six Acts passed by Parliament to suppress assemblies promoting radical reform.

=== Undated ===
- Britannia Monument to Admiral Lord Nelson at Great Yarmouth (the "Norfolk Pillar") is completed.
- The Travellers Club is established in London.

== Publications ==
- The exiled Lord Byron's narrative poem Mazeppa and satirical epic poem Don Juan (Cantos I–II, anonymously).
- John William Polidori's short story The Vampyre.
- Walter Scott's anonymous historical Waverley Novels Ivanhoe (December, dated 1820), The Bride of Lammermoor and A Legend of Montrose.

== Births ==
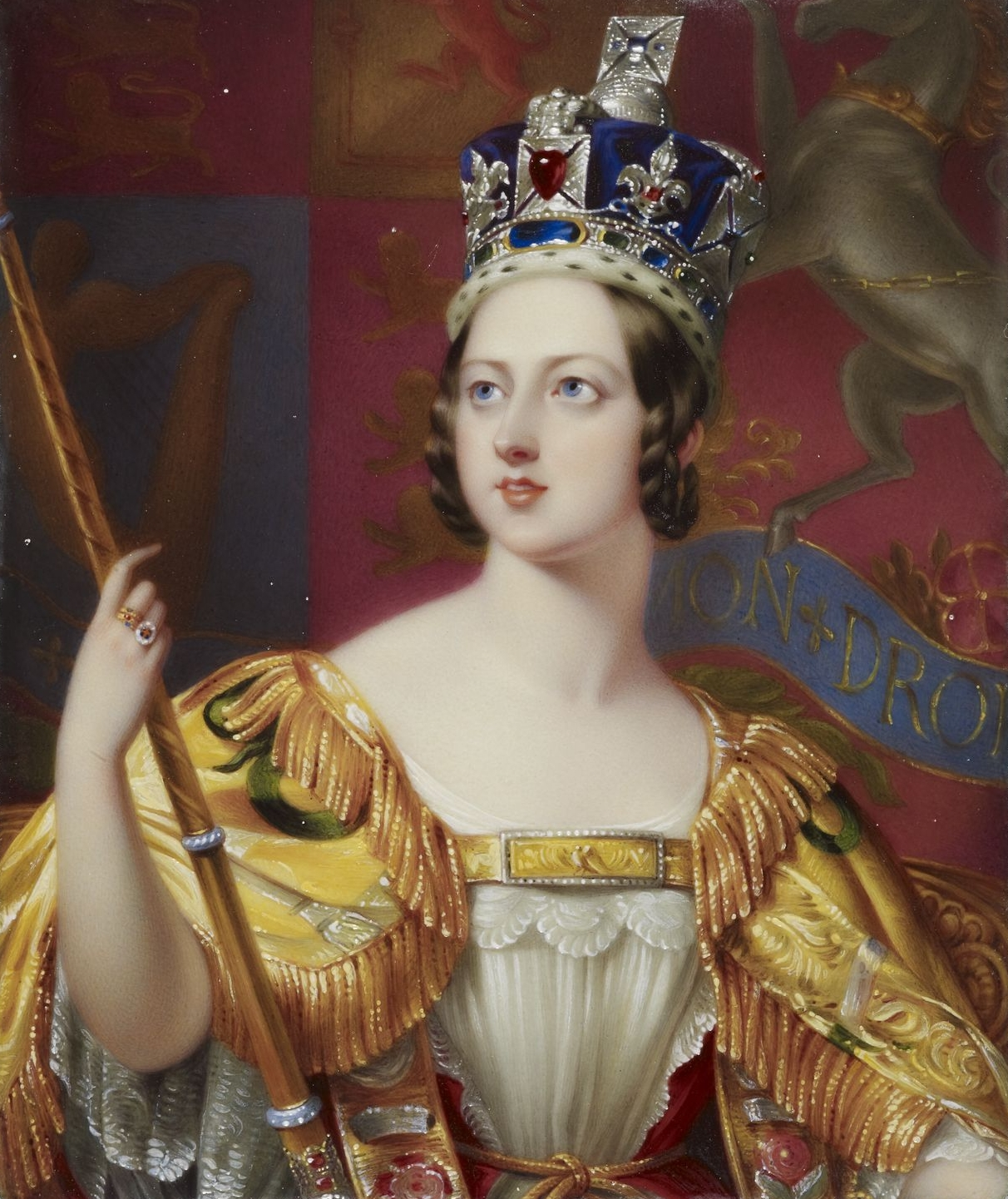
Queen Victoria

- 1 January – Arthur Hugh Clough, poet (died 1861 in Italy)
- 9 January – William Powell Frith, genre painter (died 1909)
- 8 February – John Ruskin, writer, artist and social critic (died 1900)
- 11 March – Sir Henry Tate, 1st Baronet, sugar merchant and philanthropist (died 1899)
- 28 March
  - Joseph Bazalgette, civil engineer (died 1891)
  - Roger Fenton, pioneer of photography, early war photographer (died 1869)
- 24 May – Queen Victoria (died 1901)
- 5 June – John Couch Adams, astronomer (died 1892)
- 12 June – Charles Kingsley, novelist (died 1875)
- 8 July – Leopold McClintock, Irish-born Arctic explorer and admiral (died 1907)
- 1 August – Richard Dadd, painter (died 1886)
- 13 August – George Stokes, Irish-born mathematician and physicist (died 1903)
- 26 August – Albert, Prince Consort to Queen Victoria (born at Coburg; died 1861)
- 5 September – Stillborn child to the Duke of Clarence and Adelaide of Saxe-Meiningen (born dead at Calais)
- 26 September – Edward Watkin, railway manager and politician (died 1901)
- 22 November – George Eliot, born Mary Ann Evans, novelist (died 1880)
- Undated – Baxter Langley, radical political activist (died 1892)

== Deaths ==
- 14 January – John Wolcot, satirist and poet (born 1738)
- 17 February – Henry Constantine Jennings, collector and gambler (born 1731)
- 13 March – Charles Wyatt, politician and architect (born 1758)
- 2 May – Mary Moser, painter (born 1744)
- 8 June – George Barclay, politician (born c. 1759)
- 20 July – John Playfair, natural philosopher (born 1748)
- 25 August – James Watt, Scottish inventor (born 1736)
- 7 September – Lumpy Stevens, cricketer (born 1735)
- 1 October – William Speechly, horticulturalist (born 1735)
- 30 October – John Bowles, conservative writer and lawyer (born 1753)
- 22 November – John Stackhouse, botanist (born 1742)
- 17 December – Hon. Charles Finch, politician (born 1752)
- 19 December – Sir Thomas Fremantle, admiral and politician (born 1765; died in Naples)
