= Elizabeth Stuart Bowdler =

English religious writer

Elizabeth Stuart Bowdler [née Cotton] (d. 1797) was an English religious writer.

== Family ==
Elizabeth Stuart Cotton was the second daughter of Sir John Cotton, 6th Baronet (d. 1752). She married Thomas Bowdler (bap. 1719, d. 1785) in 1742 and among the couple's five children were four who also became religious writers: Jane Bowdler, John Bowdler, Henrietta Maria Bowdler, and Thomas Bowdler. It is after her son Thomas, the editor of The Family Shakspeare, that the term "bowdlerize" is named.

== Writing ==
She was the author of Practical Observations on the Revelation of St John, that is, the section of the Bible known as the Book of Revelation, which was published anonymously in 1787. It was re-issued after her death, in 1800, as 'Practical Observations on the Revelation of St John, by the Late Mrs Bowdler'. In a new preface written to accompany the text, the editor wrote that Bowdler's book had appeared to prophesy the French Revolution.

== Bibliography ==
- Practical Observations on the Revelation of St John (published anonymously, 1787; re-published with a new preface, Bath: Crutwell, 1800).
