= John Bowdler =

John Bowdler (1746–1823) was a campaigner for moral reform in Britain and a founder of the Church Building Society. His brother and sister were the editors of the expurgated Family Shakspeare.

== Early life ==
He was born at Bath, Somerset on 18 March 1746, the son of Thomas Bowdler and Elizabeth, née Cotton, second daughter and coheiress of Sir John Cotton, 6th Baronet. John Bowdler (known as the elder to distinguish him from his son John) was the eldest son of this marriage. His mother, who wrote 'Practical Observations on the Revelations of St. John' (Bath, 1800; written in 1775), was noted for piety and culture; and she gave all her children religious training. John Bowdler attended several private schools. His brother Thomas Bowdler the elder and sister Henrietta Maria Bowdler would become well known as the expurgators of Shakespeare.

In November 1765 Bowdler was placed in the office of Mr. Barsham, a special pleader; and he practised as a chamber conveyancer between 1770 and 1780.

In January 1778 he married Harrietta, eldest daughter of John Hanbury, vice-consul at Hamburg.

In November 1779 he attended Robert Gordon, the last of the nonjuring bishops, through a fatal illness. Bowdler had attended Gordon's nonjuring services in London.

His father's death in 1785 put Bowdler in possession of a small fortune; he then retired from his profession.

== Pamphleteer for reform ==
In 1795 Bowdler wrote a long letter to Lord Auckland about the high prices of the time, in which he attacked clergy and legislators for neglecting morality and religion. In 1796 he addressed letters on similar subjects to the Archbishop of Canterbury and bishops Beilby Porteus and Samuel Horsley. He published in 1797 a pamphlet entitled Reform or Ruin, in which he sought again to expose the immorality and irreligion of the nation. The pamphlet had a wide sale, and reached an eighth edition within a year.

He disapproved of Sir Richard Hill's 'Apology for Brotherly Love,' a partial justification of the prevailing dissent, and issued pamphlets in support of the opposite views expounded in Charles Daubeney's 'Guide to the Church.'

In 1815 he formed a committee to memorialise the government to erect additional churches in the populous parts of England out of public funds. In 1816 he petitioned Lord Sidmouth to abolish lotteries.

== Death and legacy ==
He died at Eltham on 29 June 1823. Bowdler was one of the founders of the Church Building Society. In 1825 his son Thomas published a Memoir of the Late John Bowdler (which includes an account of Thomas Bowdler the elder).

== Family ==
He had ten children, six of whom survived infancy. John Bowdler the Younger and Thomas Bowdler the Younger were his sons. His daughter Elizabeth died on 4 December 1810.
