= John Bowdler the Younger =

English essayist, poet and lawyer

John Bowdler
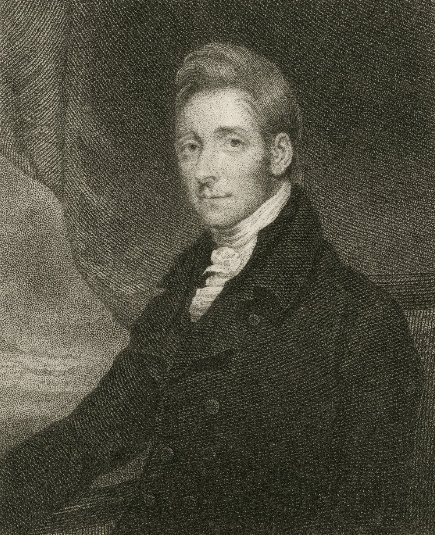
- Born: 2 February 1783
- Died: 1 February 1815 (aged 31)
- Education: Winchester College
- Occupation: Solicitor

John Bowdler the Younger (2 February 1783 – 1 February 1815), was an English essayist, poet and lawyer.

== Biography ==
John Bowdler was the younger son of John Bowdler the elder. He was born in London on 2 February 1783. He had a brother, Thomas Bowdler the Younger. He was educated at Sevenoaks School, Hyde Abbey School, and Winchester College.

In 1798 he was placed in a London solicitor's office. In 1807 he was called to the bar at Lincoln's Inn, made some progress in his profession, and attracted the notice of Lord-Chancellor Eldon.

In 1810 he began to show signs of tuberculosis, and for the sake of his health spent the two following years in southern Europe.

In May 1812, he returned to Britain, and lived with an aunt near Portsmouth. However, his health was not restored, and Bowdler died on 1 February 1815.

== Literary works ==
Bowdler engaged in literary pursuits during his illness, and in 1816 his father published his Select Pieces in Prose and Verse (2 vols.) This book contained a memoir and the journal kept by Bowdler during his tour of 1810 - 1812, as well as an exposition of Dugald Stewart's philosophical theories and religious essays and poems. It was reprinted in 1817, 1818, 1819, and 1820. Selections from its religious portions appeared in 1821 and 1823, and in 1857 the author's brother Charles reissued a part of it under the title of The Religion of the Heart, as exemplified in the Life and Writings of John Bowdler. This edition included a new biographic preface and previously unpublished correspondence.
