= Thomas Bowdler the Younger =

Thomas Bowdler the Younger (1782–1856) was an Anglican priest, who wrote a memoir of his father, John Bowdler, and his uncle, Thomas Bowdler the elder. He was also editor of an expurgated version of Edward Gibbon's Decline and Fall of the Roman Empire, as prepared by his uncle.

== Life ==
Thomas Bowdler was born on 13 March 1782, the eldest son of the lawyer and moral reformer, John Bowdler. His brother was John Bowdler the Younger, who became a lawyer. He was educated at Hyde Abbey School, Winchester, and at St John's College, Cambridge, where he proceeded B. A. in 1803, and M.A. in 1806.

In 1803 he was appointed curate of Leyton, Essex; and after holding the livings of Ash and Ridley, and of Addington, Kent, he became in 1834 incumbent of the church at Sydenham.

He took an active part in opposing the Tractarian movement around 1840. In 1846 he became secretary of the Church Building Society, which his father had been instrumental in founding. On 7 December 1849 he received a prebend in St Paul's Cathedral.

He died on 12 November 1856.

== Works ==
Collections of his sermons were published in 1820, 1834, and 1846. In 1825 was published his memoir of his father and uncle, Memoir of the Late John Bowdler, Esq., To Which Is Added, Some Account of the Late Thomas Bowdler, Esq. Editor of the Family Shakspeare. He edited with Launcelot Sharpe the Greek version of the Devotions of Lancelot Andrewes. He was also editor of the expurgated edition of Edward Gibbon (1826) prepared by his uncle, Thomas Bowdler the elder.

== Family ==
In about 1804, he married Phœbe, the daughter of mariner and merchant Joseph Cotton. His wife died in December 1854. Of the nine children they had, four died in infancy, and three in succession between 1833 and 1839.

== Notes ==
Attribution:

- This article incorporates text from a publication now in the public domain: "Bowdler, Thomas (1782–1856)". Dictionary of National Biography. London: Smith, Elder & Co. 1885–1900.
