= Henrietta Maria Bowdler =

English author and expurgator (1750–1830)

Henrietta Maria Bowdler (1750–1830), commonly called Mrs. Harriet Bowdler, was an English religious author and literary expurgator, notably of the works of William Shakespeare.

== Family ==
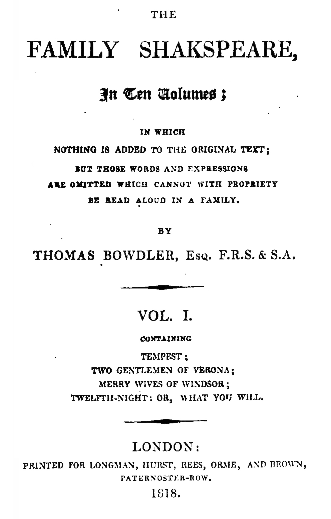
Title page of The Family Shakspeare, 1819 edition

Bowdler was born in Conington, Huntingdonshire, the daughter of Thomas and Elizabeth Stuart Bowdler, and sister of John Bowdler and Thomas Bowdler the elders. Her sister Jane was the author of an anonymous, posthumously published series of religious Poems and Essays, (2 vols., Bath, 1786), which appeared in many editions.

== Writing ==
Bowdler's own Sermons on the Doctrines and Duties of Christianity appeared anonymously and passed through nearly 50 editions. Beilby Porteus, Bishop of London, believed they were written by a clergyman, and is said to have offered their author, through the publishers, a living in his diocese.

Bowdler is thought to have done most of the editing of the first expurgated edition of Shakespeare's works, The Family Shakspeare (1807). She removed anything which seemed irreverent or immoral by the standards of the Regency era, deleting about 10% of the original works. The resulting edition was published under the name of her brother, Thomas Bowdler, after whom this type of treatment came to be known as bowdlerisation in the Victorian era.

In 1810 Bowdler edited Fragments in Prose and Verse by the late Miss Elizabeth Smith, which was very popular in religious circles.

A novel by Bowdler, "Pen Tamar, or the History of an Old Maid", was issued shortly after her death. She died at Bath on 25 February 1830.

== Bluestocking ==
Although it is unclear whether she was a regular member of the Blue Stockings Society, there has survived a description of Harriet as a young lady by Gilbert Elliot-Murray-Kynynmound, 1st Earl of Minto: "She is, I believe, a blue-stocking, but what the colour of that part of her dress is must be mere conjecture, as you will easily believe when I tell you that... she said she never looked at [the dancers in operas] but always kept her eyes shut the whole time, and when I asked her why, she said it was so indelicate she could not bear to look."
