= 1819 English cricket season =

Cricket season review

The 1819 English cricket season was the 33rd since the foundation of Marylebone Cricket Club (MCC). The Gentlemen v Players match, previously played in 1806 only, was resurrected. Details of six historically important eleven-a-side matches are known. (Note: Any match listed in the ACS' Important Match Guide (1981) is historically important, and therefore of the highest standard, whether or not a scorecard might exist. The same applies to numerous matches discovered by researchers since 1981. For further information, see First-class cricket.)

== Events ==
- 7 September – death of Lumpy Stevens, arguably the greatest bowler of the 18th century
- According to James Pycroft in The Cricket Field, the size of the wickets was increased in 1817 to 27 inches (690 mm) by 8 inches (200 mm), but it seems more likely that the rule was introduced in 1819.
- With cricket still recovering from the effects of the Napoleonic War, a total of only six matches were recorded in 1819:
  - 24 May – Cambridge Town Club v Cambridge University @ Parker's Piece, Cambridge
  - 7–9 June – EnglandI v HampshireI @ Lord's Cricket Ground
  - 21 June – Cambridge Town Club v Cambridge University @ Parker's Piece, Cambridge
  - 29–30 June – England v Hampshire @ Lord's Cricket Ground
  - 7–9 July – Gentlemen v Players @ Lord's Cricket Ground
  - 25–26 August – Epsom v Hampshire @ Epsom Downs

== Bibliography ==
- ACS (1981). A Guide to Important Cricket Matches Played in the British Isles 1709–1863. Nottingham: ACS. OCLC 85045528.
- Haygarth, Arthur (1996) [1862]. Scores & Biographies, Volume 1 (1744–1826). Kennington: Frederick Lillywhite. ISBN 978-19-00592-23-9.
- Warner, Pelham (1946). Lords: 1787–1945. London: Harrap. OCLC 877106024.
