= Jane Bowdler =

English poet and essayist (1743–1784)

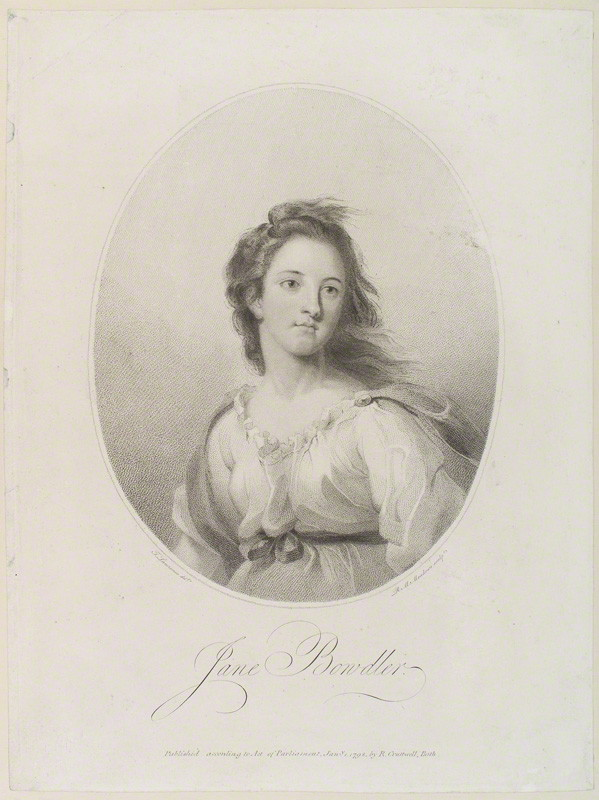
- Born: 14 February 1743; London, England
- Died: 1784
- Citizenship: Kingdom of Great Britain
- Occupations: Poet, essayist
- Writing career
- Language: English
- Genre: Poetry

Jane Bowdler (1743–1784) was an English poet and essayist. Her work gained half a century's popularity after her death.

== Family ==
Jane was born 14 February 1743, the eldest daughter of Thomas Bowdler of Bath, Somerset (1706–1785) and his wife Elizabeth Stuart Bowdler, née Cotton (died 1797), was a religious writer. Jane was the sister of John Bowdler the Elder (1746–1823), a religious pamphleteer, and of Thomas Bowdler (1754–1825), who is remembered for publishing expurgated editions of Shakespeare, edited largely by his sister Harriet, and of other works.

The non-literary member of the family was another sister, Frances (born c. 1747). She was presumably the lively, unconventional "Miss Bowdler" of Bath, who features in a diary that the 20-year-old Frances Burney kept of a lengthy visit to Teignmouth, Devon, in 1773.

== Posthumous success ==
Jane Bowdler took to writing when she lost her voice for a period of four years in about 1777. She had suffered from intermittent ill health since contracting smallpox in 1759. She died in 1784 at Ashley, near Bath, and was buried in the family vault in London.

Jane's Poems and Essays by a Lady Lately Deceased was published by her family for charity in 1786 and reprinted 16 times up to 1830. A special edition was printed in 1797 in line with her mother's will, and distributed to friends instead of a mourning ring. Among the book's many advocates was Queen Charlotte, who read it three times. Further unpublished pieces by Jane appeared in a family memoir.
