= Expurgation =

Form of censorship of artistic or other media works

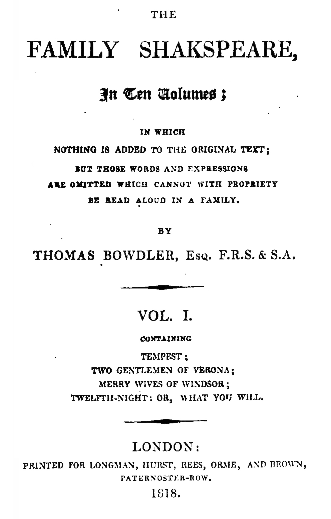
The Family Shakespeare, Thomas Bowdler's famous reworked edition of William Shakespeare's plays. 1818

An expurgation of a work, also known as a bowdlerization or fig-leafing, is a form of censorship that involves purging anything deemed noxious or offensive from an artistic work or other type of writing or media.

The term bowdlerization is often used in the context of the expurgation of lewd material from books. The term derives from Thomas Bowdler's 1818 edition of William Shakespeare's plays, which he reworked in ways that he felt were more suitable for women and children. He similarly edited Edward Gibbon's Decline and Fall of the Roman Empire. A less common term used in this context, also based on common editorial practice, is Ad usum Delphini, referring to a series of consciously censored classical works.

== Examples ==
=== Religious ===
- In 1264, Pope Clement IV ordered the Jews of the Crown of Aragon to submit their books to Dominican censors for expurgation.

=== Sexual ===
- Due to its mockery of the ancestors of the modern British royal family and graphic descriptions of sex acts and the symptoms of venereal disease, the 1751 Scottish Gaelic poetry book Ais-eridh na Sean Chánoin Albannaich ("The Resurrection of the Old Scottish Language") by Alasdair mac Mhaighstir Alasdair, national poet of Scotland, continued to be republished only in heavily bowdlerized editions by puritanical censors throughout the 18th and 19th centuries. The first uncensored text was published only in 2020.
- "The Crabfish" (known also as "The Sea Crabb"), an English folk song dating back to the mid-1800s about a man who places a crab into a chamber pot, unbeknownst to his wife, who later uses the pot without looking, and is attacked by the crab. Over the years, sanitized versions of the song were released in which a lobster or crab grabs the wife by the nose instead of by the genitals, and others in which each potentially offensive word is replaced with an inoffensive word that does not fit the rhyme scheme, thus implying that there is a correct word that does rhyme. For instance, "Children, children, bring the looking glass / Come and see the crayfish that bit your mother's a-face" (arse).
- The 1925 Harvard Press edition of Montaigne's essays (translated by George Burnham Ives) omitted the essays that pertain to sex.
- A Boston-area ban on Upton Sinclair's novel Oil! – owing to a short motel sex scene – prompted Sinclair to assemble a 150-copy fig-leaf edition with the nine offending pages blacked out as a publicity stunt.
- In 1938, a jazz song "Flat Foot Floogie (with a Floy Floy)" peaked at number two on US charts. The original lyrics were sung with the word "floozie", meaning a sexually promiscuous woman, or a prostitute, but record company Vocalion objected. Hence the word was substituted with the almost similar sounding title word "floogie" in the second recording. The "floy floy" in the title was a slang term for a venereal disease, but that was not widely known at the time. In the lyrics it is sung repeatedly "floy-doy", which was widely thought as a nonsense refrain. Since the lyrics were regarded as nonsense the song failed to catch the attention of censors.
- In 1920, an American publisher bowdlerized the George Ergerton translation of Knut Hamsun's Hunger.
- Lady Chatterley's Lover by English author D. H. Lawrence. An unexpurgated edition was not published openly in the United Kingdom until 1960.
- Several music artists have changed song titles to appease radio stations. For example, an expurgated remix of Snoop Dogg's song "Wet" was released under the title "Sweat" and Rihanna's song "S&M" had to be changed to "C'mon" in the UK.

=== Racial ===
- Recent editions of many works—including Mark Twain's Huckleberry Finn and Joseph Conrad's Nigger of the Narcissus—have found various replacements ("slave", "Indian", "soldier boy", "N-word", "children") for the word nigger. An example of bowdlerization can be plainly seen in Huckleberry Finn, in which Twain used racial slurs in natural speech to highlight what he saw as racism and prejudice endemic to the Antebellum South.
- The Agatha Christie novel first published as Ten Little Niggers in 1939 was retitled And Then There Were None for the US market in 1940, with some paperback editions retitled Ten Little Indians. UK reprints continued to use the original title until 1985, while French editions were called Dix Petits Nègres until 2020.
- The American version of the counting rhyme "Eeny, meeny, miny, moe", which was changed by some to add the word "nigger", is now sung with a different word, such as "tiger".
- The Hardy Boys children's mystery novels (published starting in 1927) contained heavy doses of racism. They were extensively revised starting in 1959 in response to parents' complaints about racial stereotypes in the books.
- The Story of Doctor Dolittle and relevant works have been reedited to remove controversial references to and plots related to non-white characters (in particular, African ones).

=== Cursing ===
- Many Internet message boards and forums use automatic wordfiltering to block offensive words and phrases from being published or automatically amend them to more innocuous substitutes such as asterisks or nonsense. This often catches innocent words, in a scenario referred to as the Scunthorpe problem: words such as 'assassinate' and 'classic' may become 'buttbuttinate' or 'clbuttic'. Users frequently self-bowdlerize their own writing by using slight misspellings, minced oaths or variants, such as 'flek', 'fcuk' or 'pron'.
- In a similar vein, content creators feel that the algorithms that spread their content or make it fit for revenue may turn against them, if certain topics are mentioned, prompting them to come up with euphemisms that may sound childish at times (a gynaecologist talking about lady bits to avoid vagina mistakenly prompting the algorithm to think the matter is too obscene to be worth broadcasting) or bizarre (a video-essay on a murder may reference the act as un-aliving)
- The 2010 song "Fuck You" by CeeLo Green, which made the top-10 in thirteen countries, was broadcast as "Forget You", with a matching music video, where the changed lyrics cannot be lip-read, as insisted on by the record company.
- The 2021 song "ABCDEFU" by Gayle was also bowdlerized for radio, with the new lyrics reading: 'A, B, C, D, E, forget you', in a similar fashion to Fuck You.

=== Other ===
- Since selected readings from Chinese vernacular novel Water Margin were added to the Chinese curriculum in primary and secondary schools after the New Culture Movement, publishers have produced expurgated versions of the original text, removing obscenities and references to spirits, devils, and violence from the stories to make them more suitable for children, teenagers, and the general public.
- A student edition of the 1953 novel Fahrenheit 451 was expurgated to remove a variety of content. This was ironic given the subject matter of the novel involves burning books. This continued for a dozen years before it was brought to author Ray Bradbury's attention and he convinced the publisher to reinstate the material.
- The 2017 video game South Park: The Fractured but Whole was originally going to have the name The Butthole of Time. However, marketers would not promote anything with a vulgarity in its title, so "butthole" was replaced with the homophone "but whole".
- In 2023 new versions of Roald Dahl's books were published by Puffin Books to remove language deemed inappropriate. Puffin had hired sensitivity readers to go over his texts to make sure the books could "continue to be enjoyed by all today". The same was done with the James Bond novels.

== See also ==
- Grawlix, typographic symbols used to bowdlerize
- "Comstockery"
- Censorship by copyright
- Minced oath
- Radio edit
- Roald Dahl revision controversy
- Think of the children
