= Thomas Bowdler =

English physician and editor (1754–1825)

Thomas Bowdler LRCP FRS
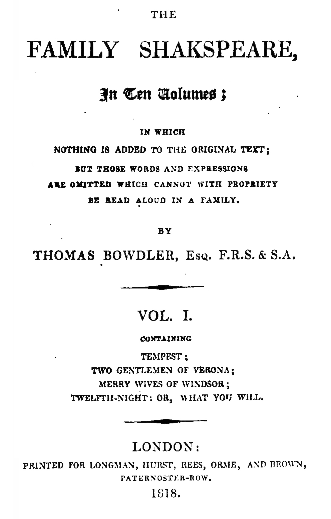
- Title page of Bowdler's best-known work
- Born: 11 July 1754; Bath, Somerset, England
- Died: 24 February 1825 (aged 70); Swansea, Wales
- Occupations: Physician, editor
- Notable work: The Family Shakspeare (1807)

Thomas Bowdler (/ˈbaʊdlər/; 11 July 1754 – 24 February 1825) was an English physician known for publishing The Family Shakespeare, an expurgated edition of William Shakespeare's plays edited by his sister Henrietta Maria Bowdler, and for publishing other editions edited by himself. The two produced editions they considered more appropriate for women and children than the original. Bowdler also published works representing an interested knowledge of continental Europe. His last work was an expurgation of Edward Gibbon's Decline and Fall of the Roman Empire, published posthumously in 1826 with the supervision of his nephew and biographer, Thomas Bowdler the Younger. From his name derives the eponym verb bowdlerise or bowdlerize, meaning to expurgate or to censor something through the omission of elements deemed unsuited to children in literature, movies, and television.

== Biography ==
Thomas Bowdler was born on 11 July 1754, in Box, near Bath, Somerset, the youngest son of the six children of Thomas Bowdler (c. 1719–1785), a banker of substantial fortune, and his wife, Elizabeth, née Cotton (d. 1797), the daughter of Sir John Cotton, 6th Baronet of Conington, Huntingdonshire. Bowdler studied medicine at the universities of St Andrews and Edinburgh, where he received his degree in 1776, graduating with a thesis on intermittent fevers. He then spent four years travelling in continental Europe, visiting the Holy Roman Empire, Hungary, Italy, Sicily and Portugal. In 1781 he caught a fever in Lisbon from a young friend whom he was attending during a fatal illness. He returned to England in bad health and with a strong aversion to the medical profession. In 1781 he was elected a Fellow of the Royal Society (FRS) and a Licentiate of the Royal College of Physicians (LRCP), but he did not continue to practise medicine. He devoted himself instead to the cause of prison reform.

Bowdler was a strong chess player and once played eight recorded games against the best chess player of the time, François-André Danican Philidor, who was so confident of his superiority that he played with several handicaps. Bowdler won twice, lost three times, and drew three times (Philidor was usually blindfolded and playing multiple opponents simultaneously, and sometimes started without one pawn. The first recorded game to feature a double rook sacrifice was played between Bowdler (white) and H. Conway in London in 1788.) The Bowdler Attack is named after him.

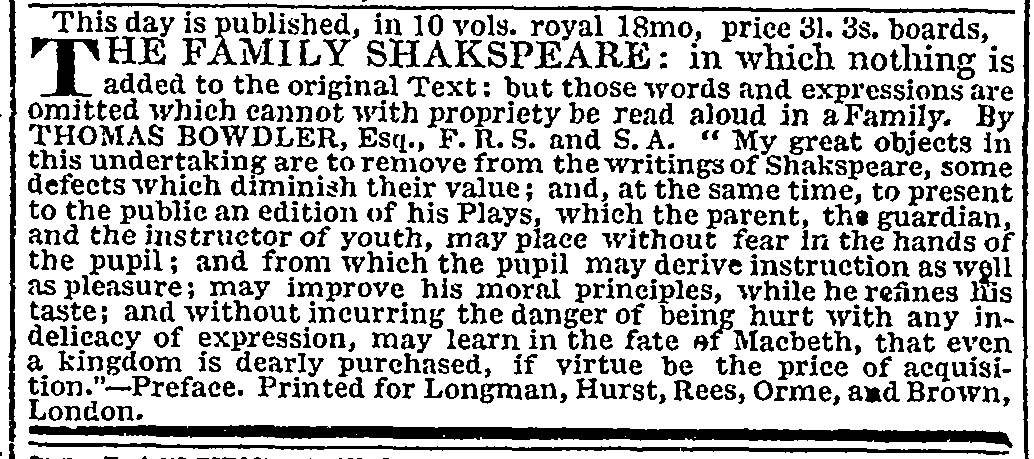
Advertisement for 1819 edition of The Family Shakspeare.

Bowdler's first published work was Letters Written in Holland in the Months of September and October 1787 (1788), giving an eye-witness account of the Prussian invasion of Holland. In 1800 Bowdler began leasing a country estate at St Boniface, on the Isle of Wight, where he lived for ten years. In September 1806, aged 52, he married Elizabeth Trevenen (née Farquharson), aged 48, widow of a naval Captain James Trevenen, who had died in Russian service at Kronstadt in 1790. The marriage was unhappy and after a few years they separated. They had no children. After the separation, the marriage was never mentioned in the Bowdler family.The biography of Bowdler by his nephew, Thomas Bowdler, makes no mention of him ever marrying.

In 1807, the first edition of the Bowdlers' The Family Shakespeare, covering 20 plays, appeared in four small volumes. From 1811 until his death in 1825, Bowdler lived at Rhyddings House, overlooking Swansea Bay, from where he travelled extensively in Britain and Europe. In 1815, he published Observations on Emigration to France, With an Account of Health, Economy, and the Education of Children, a cautionary work propounding his opinion that English invalids should avoid French spas and go instead to Malta. In 1818, Bowdler published an expanded edition of The Family Shakspeare, covering all 36 available plays. This had much success. By 1827 the work was in its fifth edition. During his last years, Bowdler prepared an expurgated version of the works of the historian Edward Gibbon, which was published posthumously in 1826. His sister Jane Bowdler (1743–1784) was a poet and essayist. Another sister, Henrietta Maria Bowdler (Harriet) (1750–1830), collaborated with Bowdler on his expurgated Shakespeare.

Bowdler died aged 70 at Rhyddings near Swansea on 24 February 1825, and was buried at Oystermouth. He left bequests to the poor of Swansea and Box. His large library of unexpurgated volumes of 17th and 18th century tracts, collected by his ancestors Thomas Bowdler (1638–1700) and Thomas Bowdler (1661–1738), was donated to the University of Wales, Lampeter. In 1825 Bowdler's nephew, also a Thomas Bowdler, published Memoir of the Late John Bowdler, Esq., to Which Is Added, Some Account of the Late Thomas Bowdler, Esq. Editor of the Family Shakspeare.

== The Family Shakespeare ==
During Bowdler's childhood, his father had entertained his family with readings from Shakespeare. Later in life, Bowdler realised his father had been omitting or altering passages he felt unsuitable for the ears of his wife and children. Bowdler felt it was worthwhile to publish an edition which might be used in a family whose father was not such a "circumspect and judicious reader" as to accomplish an expurgation himself.

In 1807, the first edition of The Family Shakspeare appeared in four duodecimo volumes, containing 24 plays. In 1818 a second edition ensued covering all 36 available plays. Each play has an introduction where Bowdler summarises and justifies his textual changes. According to his nephew's Memoir, the first edition was prepared by Bowdler's sister Harriet, but both appeared with only Thomas Bowdler's name, probably because a woman would then be reluctant to admit publicly that she could do such work or even understand Shakespeare's racy verses. By 1850 eleven editions had appeared.

The spelling "Shakspeare", used by Bowdler and by his nephew Thomas in his memoir of Thomas Bowdler the elder, was changed in later editions (from 1847 on) to "Shakespeare", representing the general spelling of Shakespeare's name.

The Bowdlers were not the first to perform such a project, but Bowdler's commitment not to augment or add to Shakespeare's text, merely remove sensitive material, contrasted with earlier practice. Nahum Tate as Poet Laureate had rewritten the tragedy of King Lear with a happy ending; in 1807, Charles Lamb and Mary Lamb published Tales from Shakespeare for children with synopses of 20 of the plays, but seldom quoted the original text. Though The Family Shakespeare was seen as a negative example of censorship by the literary establishment and its commitment to "authentic" Shakespeare, the Bowdler editions made it more acceptable to teach Shakespeare to wider and younger audiences. According to the poet Algernon Charles Swinburne, "More nauseous and more foolish cant was never chattered than that which would deride the memory or depreciate the merits of Bowdler. No man ever did better service to Shakespeare than the man who made it possible to put him into the hands of intelligent and imaginative children."

=== Changes ===
Bowdler lent his name to the English verb bowdlerise, which means "to remove words or sections from a book or other work that are considered unsuitable or offensive". The derivative noun is bowdlerism. Some examples of alterations made by Bowdler's edition:

- In Hamlet, the death of Ophelia was termed an accidental drowning, not a possibly intended suicide.
- "God!" as an exclamation is replaced with "Heavens!"
- In Henry IV, Part 2, the prostitute Doll Tearsheet is omitted outright, the slightly more reputable Mistress Quickly retained.

Prominent modern figures such as Michiko Kakutani (in The New York Times) and William Safire (in his book How Not To Write) have incorrectly accused Bowdler of changing Lady Macbeth's famous "Out, damned spot!" line in Macbeth to "Out, crimson spot!", when in fact this particular emendation was the work of Thomas Bulfinch and Stephen Bulfinch, in their 1865 edition of Shakespeare's works.

== Bibliography ==
- The Family Shakespeare, Volume One, The Comedies, ISBN 0-923891-95-1
- The Family Shakespeare, Volume Two, The Tragedies, ISBN 0-923891-98-6
- The Family Shakespeare, Volume Three, The Histories, ISBN 0-923891-99-4
- The Family Shakspeare, in which nothing is added to the original text; but those words and expressions are omitted which cannot with propriety be read aloud in a family by Thomas Bowdler in 10 volumes, Facsimile reprint of 2nd edition, revised, in 1820, Eureka Press, 2009. ISBN 978-4-902454-16-1
- Bowdler, Thomas (1825). Memoir of the Late John Bowdler, Esq., To Which Is Added, Some Account of the Late Thomas Bowdler, Esq. Editor of the Family Shakspeare. London: Longman, Hurst, Rees, Orme, Brown and Green. OCLC 13909543.

== See also ==
- Ad usum Delphini
- Anthony Comstock
- List of chess games (Bowdler, 1788)
