= List of African writers by country =

This is a list of prominent and notable writers from Africa. It includes poets, novelists, children's writers, essayists, and scholars, listed by country.

== Algeria ==
See: List of Algerian writers

== Angola ==
See: List of Angolan writers

== Benin ==
- Christine Adjahi Gnimagnon, also connected with Senegal
- Stanislas Adotevi (1934–2024), French-language academic and philosopher^{[Gikandi]} ^{[Jahn]}
- Berte-Evelyne Agbo, French-language poet also connected with Senegal
- Colette Senami Agossou Houeto (1939– )
- Julien Alapini (1906–1971), ethnographer and playwright^{[Gikandi]} ^{[Jahn]}
- Ryad Assani-Razaki (1981– )
- Francis Aupiais (1877–1945), French-born missionary and anthropologist
- Olympe Bhêly-Quenum (1928– ), writer and journalist^{[Gikandi]} ^{[Jahn]}
- Florent Couao-Zotti (1964– ), novelist, writer of comics, plays and short stories
- Félix Couchoro (1900–1968), novelist, also connected with Togo^{[Gikandi]} ^{[Jahn]} ^{[Killam & Rowe]}
- Richard Dogbeh (1932–2003), also connected with Togo, Senegal and Côte d'Ivoire^{[Jahn]}
- Adelaide Fassinou (1955– ), novelist
- Dieudonné Gnammankou, writer and historian
- Paul Hazoumé (1890–1980), novelist^{[Gikandi]} ^{[Jahn]}
- Gisèle Hountondji (1954– ), French-language novelist
- Paulin J. Hountondji (1942–2024), philosopher and politician
- Béatrice Lalinon Gbado, children's writer
- Paulin Joachim (1931–2012), poet, journalist and editor^{[Jahn]}
- Lauryn, also connected with Côte d'Ivoire and Togo, born in France (1978–)
- Jean Pliya (1931–2015), playwright and short story writer^{[Jahn]}
- José Pliva (1966– ), actor and playwright

== Botswana ==
- Unity Dow (1959–), judge, human rights activist, writer and minister of basic education
- Bessie Head (1937–1986), novelist and short-story writer born in South Africa^{[Gikandi]} ^{[Killam & Rowe]}
- Leetile Disang Raditladi (1910–1971), playwright and poet^{[Jahn]}
- Barolong Seboni (1957–), poet and academic^{[Jahn]}

== Burkina Faso ==
See: List of Burkinabe writers

== Burundi ==
- Esther Kamatari (1951–)
- Ketty Nivyabandi (1978–)
- Gaël Faye (1982–)

== Cameroon ==
See: List of Cameroonian writers

== Central African Republic ==
- Pierre Makombo Bamboté (1932–), novelist and poet^{[Gikandi]}
- Etienne Goyémidé (1942–1997), novelist, poet and short story writer: Le Silence de la Foret^{[Gikandi]}
- Blaise N'Djehoya (1953–), novelist^{[Killam & Rowe]}
- Cyriaque Robert Yavoucko (1953–), novelist^{[Gikandi]}
- Adrienne Yabouza (1965–), novelist

== Chad ==
- Salma Khalil Alio (1982–), poet, short story writer and artist.
- Khayar Oumar Deffalah (c. 1944–), politician and autobiographical writer
- Ali Abdel-Rhamane Haggar (1960–), economist and writer
- Marie-Christine Koundja (1957–), novelist and diplomat
- Koulsy Lamko (1959–), playwright, poet, novelist and university lecturer
- Joseph Brahim Seid (1927–1980), writer and politician^{[Jahn]}
- Ahmat Taboye, literary critic

== Congo (Brazzaville) ==
- André-Patient Bokiba, academic
- Adèle Caby-Livannah (1957– )
- Emmanuel Dongala (1941– )
- Mambou Aimée Gnali (1935– )
- Bill Kouélany (1965– )
- Sony Lab'ou Tansi (1947–1995), born in Congo-Kinshasa
- Henri Lopes (1937–2023), born in Congo-Kinshasa
- Alain Mabanckou (1966– )
- Jadelin Mabiala Gangbo (1976– )
- Jean-Pierre Makouta-Mboukou (1929–2012)^{[Jahn]}
- Martial Malinda, also known as Sylvain Bemba / Michel Belabin (1934–1995)^{[Jahn]}
- Jean Malonga (1907–1985)^{[Jahn]}
- Guy Menga (1935– )^{[Jahn]}
- Florence Lina Mouissou (1972– ), novelist
- Maxime n'Debeka (1944– )^{[Jahn]}
- Victor N'Gembo-Mouanda (1969– )
- Dieudonné Niangouna (1976– ), playwright, novelist, and poet
- Theophile Obenga (1936– )
- Martial Sinda (c.1930– )^{[Jahn]}
- Tchicaya U Tam'si (1931–1988)^{[Jahn]}
- Jean-Baptiste Tati-Loutard (1938–2009)^{[Jahn]}
- Jeannette Balou Tchichelle (1947–2005)
- Marie-Leontine Tsibinda (1936–1958)
- Brigitte Yengo

== Congo (Democratic Republic) – formerly Zaïre ==
- Léonie Abo (1945– ), autobiographical writer
- J'ongungu Lokolé Bolamba (1913–1990), poet^{[Gikandi]}
- Raïs Neza Boneza (1979– ), poet and peace researcher
- Amba Bongo, writer and advocate for refugees
- Maguy Kabamba (1960– ), writer and translator
- Kama Sywor Kamanda (1952– ), writer and poet^{[Killam & Rowe]}
- Charles Djungu-Simba Kamatenda (1953– ), journalist, teacher, publisher, and writer^{[Gikandi]}
- Paul Lomami-Tshibamba (1914–1985), novelist, born in Congo-Brazzaville^{[Gikandi]}
- Alain Mabanckou (1966 - ), novelist
- Ngal Mbwil a Mpaang (1933– ), novelist^{[Gikandi]}
- Buabua wa Kayembe Mubadiate (1950– ), playwright^{[Gikandi]}
- V. Y. Mudimbe (1941–2025), philosopher, academic and author^{[Gikandi]}
- Fiston Mwanza Mujila (1981– ), novelist ^{[Métailié]}
- Jimi Yuma (1953-), short story writer and graphic novel script writer
- Kavidi Wivine N'Landu, poet
- Clémentine Nzuji (1944– ), poet^{[Gikandi]}
- Sony Labou Tansi (1947–1995), novelist and poet^{[Gikandi]} ^{[Killam & Rowe]}
- Samy Tshileu (1998–present), theologian, apologist, philosopher and author
- Frederick Kambemba Yamusangie, novelist, playwright and poet
- Lye M. Yoka, playwright and short story writer ^{[Gikandi]}
- Batukezanga Zamenga (1933–2000), novelist and essayist^{[Gikandi]}
- Sinzo Aanza (1990-), writer, playwright and visual artist
- Sandra Uwiringiyimana (1994– ), human rights activist, author of How Dare The Sun Rise

== Côte d'Ivoire ==
- Josette Abondio (b. 1949), novelist, children's writer, playwright
- Marguerite Abouet, born in Abidjan (b. 1971), writer of graphic novels
- Francois-Joseph Amon d'Aby (1913–2007)^{[Jahn]}
- Raphael Atta Koffi (b. 1942), writer and playwright^{[Jahn]}
- Séry Bailly (1948–2018), academic, politician and short-story writer
- Angèle Bassorá-Ouédraogo, also connected with Burkina Faso (b. 1967), poet and journalist
- Joseph Miezan Bognini (1936–2017), poet^{[Jahn]}
- Fatou Bolli (b. 1952), novelist
- Tanella Boni (b. 1954), poet and novelist
- Micheline Coulibaly, born in Vietnam (1950–2003), short story writer and writer for children
- Bernard Binlin Dadié (1916–2019), novelist, playwright, poet and politician^{[Jahn]} ^{[Killam & Rowe]}
- Jeanne de Cavally (1926–1992), children's book writer
- Gaston Demand Goh (b. 1940), playwright and accountant^{[Jahn]}
- Henriette Diabate (b. 1935), politician and writer
- Mamadou Diallo (1920–1980), poet^{[Jahn]}
- Richard Dogbeh, also connected with Benin, Senegal and Togo (1932–2003), novelist and educator
- Bertin B. Doutéo (1927–1990), poet^{[Jahn]}
- Fatou Fanny-Cissé (1971–2018), novelist, short story writer, journalist and editor
- Germain Coffi Gadeau (1913–2000), playwright^{[Jahn]}
- Gauz (author name of Patrick Armand-Gbaka Brede, b. 1971)
- Werewere-Liking Gnepo (b. 1950), also connected with Cameroon, writer, playwright and performer
- Gilbert G. Groud (b. 1956), painter, illustrator and author
- Josué Guébo (b. 1972), poet and short-story writer
- Flore Hazoumé (b. 1959), writer known for short stories
- Simone Kaya (1937–2007), considered the first Ivorian woman writer
- Fatou Kéita (b. 1965)
- Venance Konan (b. 1958), journalist and writer
- Maurice Koné (1932–1980), poet^{[Jahn]}
- Adjoua Flore Kouame (b. 1964), novelist
- Ahmadou Kourouma (1927–2003), novelist^{[Jahn]} ^{[Killam & Rowe]}
- Aké Loba (1927–2012), novelist^{[Jahn]}
- Michelle Lora (b. 1968), children's writer, academic
- Charles Nokan (1936–2022), novelist and playwright^{[Jahn]}
- Véronique Tadjo (b. 1955), poet, novelist and artist
- Regina Yaou (1955–2017), novelist
- Zaourou Zadi (1938–2012), playwright^{[Jahn]}

== Djibouti ==
- Waberi Abdourahman (1965–), novelist, poet and academic^{[Gikandi]}
- Mouna-Hodan Ahmed (1972–), French-language novelist

== Egypt ==
See: List of Egyptian writers

== Equatorial Guinea ==
- María Nsué Angüe (1945–2017), novelist and writer
- Justo Bolekia Boleká (1954–), professor and Bubi writer
- Juan Balboa Boneke (1938–2014), politician and writer^{[Gikandi]}
- Raquel Ilombé (1938–1992), Spanish-language writer
- Juan Tomás Ávila Laurel (1966–), Annobonese writer^{[Gikandi]}
- Donato Ndongo-Bidyogo (1950–), writer and journalist^{[Gikandi]}

== Eritrea ==
- Hamid Barole Abdu (1953–), non-fiction
- Beyene Haile (1941–2012), Tigrinya-language writer, novelist, playwright and public administrator
- Reesom Haile (2003–), Tigrinya-language poet
- Saba Kidane (1978–), Tigrinya poet
- Hannah Pool (1974–), journalist
- Alemseged Tesfai (1944–), English-language playwright

== Ethiopia ==
- Sahle Selassie (c. 1795–1847)
- Haddis Alemayehu (1910–2003)
- Michael Daniel Ambatchew (1967–2012)
- Āfawarq Gabra Iyasus (1868–1947)
- Tsegaye Gabre-Medhin (1936–2006)
- Moges Kebede
- Tāddasa Lībān
- Tsehay Melaku
- Dinaw Mengestu (1978–)
- Maaza Mengiste (1974–)
- Nega Mezlekia (1958–)
- Martha Nasibù (1931–2020)
- Lemn Sissay (1967–)
- Hama Tuma (1949–)
- Mammo Wudneh (1931–2012)
- Birhānu Zarīhun (1933/4–1987)
- Nega Mezlekia (1958–)
- Etalem Eshete (1968–)

== Gabon ==
- Jean-Baptiste Abessolo (1932–), educator and short story writer
- Peggy Lucie Auleley, French-language poet and novelist
- Bessora (1968–, in Belgium), novelist and short story writer^{[Gikandi]}
- Charline Effah (1977–), French-language novelist and educator
- Rene Maran, born near Martinique (1887–1960), poet and novelist
- Chantal Magalie Mbazoo-Kassa, French-language poet and novelist
- Justine Mintsa (1967–), French-language novelist
- Nadège Noëlle Ango Obiang (1973–), French-language short story writer
- Nadia Origo (1977–), novelist and publisher
- Honorine Ngou (1957–), novelist and academic
- Vincent de Paul Nyonda (1918–1995), playwright
- Maurice Okoumba-Nkoghe (1954–), poet and teacher^{[Gikandi]}
- Laurent Owondo (1948–2019), playwright^{[Gikandi]}
- Angèle Ntyugwetondo Rawiri (1954–2010), novelist^{[Gikandi]}

== Gambia ==
- Janet Badjan-Young (1937–), playwright
- William Conton (1925–2003), educator, historian and novelist, also associated with Sierra Leone
- Hassoum Ceesay (1971 -), historian, curator, educator, scholar and novelist
- Ebrima Ceesay (1966-), academic, author, scholar and former editor
- Lamin Ceesay (1990–), writer and translator.
- Ebou Dibba (1943–2000), novelist
- Dayo Forster (fl. 2007), novelist
- Hassan Bubacar Jallow (1950–), law books, politician and barrister
- Augusta Jawara (1924–1981), playwright
- Joseph Henry Joof (1960–)
- Alhaji Alieu Ebrima Cham Joof (1924–2011), historian, politician and Pan-Africanist
- Tamsier Joof (1973–)
- Augusta Mahoney (1924–1981), playwright and activist for women's rights
- Florence Mahoney (1929–), author and historian
- Sulayman S. Nyang (1944–2018), historian and lecturer
- Lenrie Peters (1932−2009), poet and novelist, also associated with Sierra Leone
- Tijan Sallah (1958–), poet, publisher
- Sally Singhateh (1977–), poet and novelist
- Lamin Sanneh (1942–2019), scholar, novelist, historian, and poet
- Modou Lamin Age-Almusaf Sowe (1990–), novelist, scholar, playwright, poet, and event organizer
- Phillis Wheatley (1753–1784), poet

== Ghana ==
See: List of Ghanaian writers

== Guinea ==
- Kesso Barry (born 1948), autobiographer also associated with Senegal^{[Gikandi]}
- Saïdou Bokoum (born 1945), novelist^{[Gikandi]}
- Sory Camara, anthropologist^{[Gikandi]}
- Ahmed Tidjani Cissé (born 1942), playwright^{[Gikandi]}
- Koumanthio Zeinab Diallo (born 1956), poet and novelist^{[Gikandi]}
- Alioum Fantouré (born 1938), economist and novelist^{[Gikandi]}
- Keita Fodeba (1921–1969), actor, politician and writer^{[Jahn]}
- Lansiné Kaba (1941–2023), historian
- Fodéba Keïta (1921–1969), poet and dancer^{[Gikandi]}
- Siré Komara (born 1991), novelist: Mes Racines
- Camara Laye (1928–1980), novelist: The Black Child^{[Gikandi]} ^{[Jahn]} ^{[Killam & Rowe]}
- Tierno Monénembo (born 1947), novelist: The Oldest Orphan, Les écailles du Ciel, Peulorihno, Le Roi de Kahel^{[Gikandi]}
- Condetto Nénékhaly-Camera (1930–1972), poet and playwright^{[Jahn]}
- Djibril Tamsir Niane (1932–2021), novelist and historian^{[Gikandi]}
- Williams Sassine (1944–1997), French-language novelist^{[Gikandi]} ^{[Killam & Rowe]}
- Sékou Touré (1922–1984), politician, political writer and occasional poet^{[Jahn]}
- Mamadou Traoré, also known as Ray Autra (1916–1991), teacher and poet^{[Jahn]}

== Guinea-Bissau ==
- Amílcar Cabral (1924–1973), agronomist, writer and politician
- Vasco Cabral (1926–2005)
- José Carlos Schwarz (1949–1977), poet and musician
- Fausto Duarte (1903–1953), from Cape Verde
- Carlos Lopes (1960–)
- Hélder Proença (died 2009)
- Carlos Semedo, poet
- Abdulai Silla (1958–)

== Kenya ==
See: List of Kenyan writers

== Lesotho ==
- David Cranmer Theko Bereng (1900–1974), Sotho poet^{[Jahn]}
- Caroline Ntseliseng Khaketla (1918–2012) ^{[Jahn]}
- Simon Majara (1924–), Sotho novelist^{[Jahn]}
- Zakea D. Mangoaela (1883–1963), folklorist^{[Jahn]}
- Thomas Mofolo (1876–1948), novelist^{[Jahn]}
- A. S. Mopeli-Paulus (1913–1960), novelist
- Edward Motsamai (1870–1959), politician and writer^{[Jahn]}
- Kemuel Edward Ntsane (1920–1983), Sotho poet and novelist^{[Jahn]}
- Basildon Peta (1972–), journalist
- Everitt Lechesa Segoete (1858–1923), religious and social writer^{[Jahn]}
- Azariele M. Sekese (1849–1930), Basotho author and historian^{[Jahn]}
- Joseph I. F. Tjokosela (c. 1911–?), Catholic writer and teacher^{[Jahn]}

== Liberia ==
- Edwin Barclay (1882–1955), politician and writer
- Thomas E. Besolow (c.1867–?), autobiographical writer^{[Jahn]}
- Edward Wilmot Blyden (1832–1912), born in the Virgin Islands (see also Sierra Leone), educator, writer, diplomat and politician
- Roland Tombekai Dempster (1910–1965), poet^{[Jahn]}
- Hawa Jande Golakai (1979–)
- Bai T. Moore (1916–1988), poet, novelist, folklorist and essayist^{[Jahn]} ^{[Killam & Rowe]}
- Wilton G. S. Sankawulo (1937–2009), politician and author
- Vamba Sherif (1973–)

== Libya ==
- Wafa Albueise (1973–), lawyer and writer
- Sadiq Al-Nayhum (1937–1994), Islamic writer, critic and journalist
- Khalifa al-Fakhri, short story writer
- Ahmed Fagih (1942–2019), novelist^{[Gikandi]}
- Muammar al-Gaddafi (1942–2011), politician and occasional novelist
- Ibrahiem El-kouni (1948–), novelist^{[Gikandi]}
- Latifa al-Zayyat (1923–1996), activist and novelist

== Madagascar ==
- Ny Avana Ramanantoanina
- Dox
- Elie-Charles Abraham (1919–1989), poet^{[Gikandi]}
- Victor Georges Andriananjason (1940– ), musician and non-fiction writer^{[Jahn]}
- Lucile Allorge (1937– ), botanist
- David Jaomanoro (1953–2014), poet, short story writer and playwright
- Lucien Xavier Michel Andrianarahinjaka (1929–1997), politician, writer, and poet
- Esther Nirina (1932–2004), poet^{[Gikandi]}
- Hajasoa Vololona Picard-Ravololonirina (1956– ), academic, politician and poet^{[Gikandi]}
- Jean-Joseph Rabearivelo (1903–1937), poet and novelist^{[Gikandi]} ^{[Jahn]} ^{[Killam & Rowe]}
- Jacques Rabemananjara (1913–2005), poet, playwright and politician^{[Jahn]} ^{[Killam & Rowe]}
- Raymond William Rabemananjara (1913–?), historian and writer^{[Gikandi]}
- Fidelis Justin Rabetsimandranto (1907–1966), novelist and playwright^{[Jahn]}
- Charlotte Arisoa Rafenomanjato (1936–2008), writer and translator^{[Gikandi]}
- Jean-Luc Raharimanana (1967– ), French-language writer
- Elie Rajaonarison (1951–2010), poet
- Régis Rajemisa-Raolison (1913–1990), poet and educator^{[Gikandi]} ^{[Jahn]}
- Michèle Rakotoson (1948– ), novelist, short story writer and playwright^{[Gikandi]}
- Flavien Ranaivo (1914–1999), poet and writer^{[Gikandi]} ^{[Jahn]}
- Esther Razanadrasoa (1892–1931), poet, novelist and journal editor
- Edmond Randriamananjara aka Randja Zanamihoatra (1925 - 1997), poet

== Malawi ==
See: List of Malawian writers

== Mali ==
- Ahmad Baba al Massufi (1556–1627), writer and scholar.
- Abdoulaye Ascofaré (1949– ), poet and filmmaker.
- Ibrahima Aya (1967– )
- Amadou Hampâté Bâ (1900/1901–1991), historian, theologian, ethnographer, novelist and autobiographer.^{[Jahn]} ^{[Killam & Rowe]}
- Adame Ba Konaré (1947– ), historian and writer.
- Seydou Badian Kouyaté (1928–2018), novelist and politician.^{[Gikandi]} ^{[Jahn]}
- Siriman Cissoko (1934–2005), poet.^{[Jahn]}
- Sidiki Dembele (1921–1983), novelist and playwright.^{[Jahn]}
- Massa Makan Diabaté (1938–1988), historian, author and playwright.^{[Jahn]}
- Souéloum Diagho, poet.
- Aïda Mady Diallo, novelist and director.
- Aly Diallo, French-language novelist first published in German translation.
- Alpha Mandé Diarra (1954– )
- Oumou Armand Diarra (1967– ), born in Yugoslavia.
- Doumbi Fakoly (1944–2024), non-fiction writer
- Aïcha Fofana (1957–2003), first female Malian novelist
- Mamadou Gologo (1924–2009), autobiographical novelist and poet.^{[Jahn]}
- Aoua Kéita (1912–1980), independence activist and autobiographer.
- Fatoumata Keïta (1977– ), poet, novelist, essayist.
- Moussa Konaté (1951–2013), French-language writer.
- Ibrahima Mamadou Ouane (1908–?), writer.^{[Jahn]}
- Yambo Ouologuem (1940–2017), novelist.^{[Jahn]}
- Bernadette Sanou Dao (1952– ), author and politician.
- Fily Dabo Sissoko (1900–1964), poet.^{[Jahn]}
- Fanta-Taga Tembely (1946– ), French-language novelist.
- Aminata Traoré (1942– ), author, politician and political activist.
- Falaba Issa Traoré (1930–2003), writer, comedian, playwright and director.

== Mauritania ==
- Ahmad ibn al-Amin al-Shinqiti (1872–1913), Arabic-language writer
- Ibn Razqa (died 1144 AH/1731 AD), poet and scholar
- Moussa Diagana (1946–2018), French-language writer
- Moussa Ould Ebnou (1956–), French-language novelist
- Abderrahmane Sissako (1961–), filmmaker

== Mauritius ==
See: List of Mauritian writers

== Morocco ==
See: List of Moroccan writers

== Mozambique ==
- Paulina Chiziane (1955– ), Portuguese-language novelist and short-story writer
- Mia Couto (1955– ), novelist and short story writer^{[Killam & Rowe]} ^{[Gikandi]}
- José Craveirinha (1922–2003), Portuguese-language poet^{[Jahn]}
- Luis Bernardo Honwana (1942– ), Portuguese-language short story writer^{[Gikandi]}
- Ungulani Ba Ka Khosa (1957– ), Portuguese-language novelist and short-story writer
- Fátima Langa (1953–2017), children's book author in Portuguese and various Bantu languages
- Virgílio de Lemos (1929-2013), Portuguese-language journalist and poet^{[Williams]}
- Lina Magaia (1940s–2011), Portuguese-language novelist and short-story writer^{[Killam & Rowe]}
- Malangatana Ngwenya (1936–2011), poet and autobiographical writer^{[Jahn]}
- Orlando Marques de Almeida Mendes (1916–1990), Portuguese-language novelist^{[Gikandi]}
- Lília Momplé (1935– ), Portuguese-language fiction writer
- Eduardo Mondlane (1924–1969), politician and autobiographical writer^{[Jahn]}
- Amélia Muge (1952– ), writer and singer
- Rui de Noronha (1909–1943), poet^{[Jahn]}
- Glória de Santana (1925–2009), poet
- Marcelino dos Santos (1929–2020), poet^{[Jahn]}
- Castro Soromenho (1910–1968), journalist, novelist and short story writer^{[Jahn]}
- Noémia de Sousa (1926–2003), Portuguese-language poet^{[Jahn]}
- Lucílio Manjate (1981– ), Portuguese-language short story, novelist, and fiction writer.

== Namibia ==
- Neshani Andreas (1964–2011), novelist
- Ndeutala Angolo (1952–), novelist and nonfiction writer
- Joseph Diescho (1955–), novelist
- Dorian Haarhoff (1944–), poet and academic
- Giselher Werner Hoffmann (1958–), German-language novelist
- Anoeschka von Meck (1967–), journalist and Afrikaans-language writer
- Hans Daniel Namuhuja (1924–1998), poet
- Cosmo Pieterse (1930–), playwright and poet
- Sylvia Schlettwein (1975–), writer, translator and critic
- Mvula ya Nangolo (1943–2019), poet and journalist

== Niger ==
- Idé Adamou (1951– ), poet and novelist^{[Gikandi]}
- Ousmane Amadou (1948–2018), poet, novelist, lawyer and journalist^{[Gikandi]}
- Djibo Bakary (1922–1998), politician and writer
- Ada Boureïma, writer
- Andrée Clair, born and died in France (1916–1982), ethnographer and children's writer
- Mahamadou Halilou Sabbo (1937–2006), novelist and playwright^{[Gikandi]}
- Boubacar Hama Beidi (born 1951), educator, author, and politician
- Boubou Hama (1906–1982), politician and writer^{[Gikandi]} ^{[Jahn]}
- Hawad (1950– ), Tuareg poet currently living in France^{[Gikandi]}
- Hélène Kaziende (1967– ), teacher, journalist and short story writer
- Salihu Kwantagora (1929– ), songwriter and poet^{[Gikandi]}
- Abdoulaye Mamani (1932–1993), poet, novelist and trade unionist^{[Gikandi]}
- Ide Oumarou (1937–2002), politician, diplomat and writer
- Samira Sabou (born 1981), journalist and blogger
- Andre Salifou (1942– 2022), politician, diplomat and academic^{[Jahn]}

== Nigeria ==
See: List of Nigerian writers

== Rwanda ==
See: List of Rwandan writers

== São Tomé and Príncipe ==
- Olinda Beja (1946–), novelist
- Sara Pinto Coelho (1913–1990), fiction writer and playwright
- Caetano da Costa Alegre (1864–1890), Portuguese-language poet^{[Jahn]}
- Mário Domingues (1899–1977), novelist
- Conceição Lima (1962–), Portuguese-language poet
- Manuela Margarido (1925–2007), Portuguese-language poet
- Alda do Espírito Santo (1926–2010), Portuguese-language poet^{[Gikandi]} ^{[Jahn]}
- José Francisco Tenreiro (1921–1963), literary critic and poet^{[Gikandi]} ^{[Jahn]}

== Senegal ==
See: List of Senegalese writers

== Seychelles ==
- Antoine Abel (1934–2004), poet and fable writer^{[Gikandi]}

== Sierra Leone ==
- John Akar (1927–1975), broadcaster, playwright and diplomat^{[Jahn]}
- Gaston Bart-Williams (1938–1990), exiled writer and journalist^{[Jahn]}
- Ishmael Beah (born 1980), child soldier and memoirist
- Edward Wilmot Blyden (1832–1912), pan-Africanist, born in the Virgin Islands (see also Liberia)
- Adelaide Casely-Hayford (1868–1960), short story writer and educator^{[Gikandi]} ^{[Killam & Rowe]}
- Gladys Casely-Hayford (1904–1950), poet also associated with Ghana^{[Gikandi]} ^{[Killam & Rowe]}
- Syl Cheney-Coker (born 1945/47), poet, journalist and novelist^{[Gikandi]} ^{[Killam & Rowe]}
- Robert Wellesley-Cole (1907–1995), surgeon and autobiographical writer^{[Jahn]}
- William Conton (1925–2003), educator, historian, and novelist also associated with The Gambia^{[Gikandi]} ^{[Killam & Rowe]}
- R. Sarif Easmon (1913–1997), doctor, playwright and novelist^{[Gikandi]} ^{[Jahn]} ^{[Killam & Rowe]}
- Aminatta Forna (born 1964), memoirist and novelist
- Namina Forna (born 1987), novelist and screen writer
- Wilfred Freddy Will Kanu Jr. (born 1977) author, poet, lyricist, hip-hop emcee and blogger.
- Africanus Horton (1835–1883), Creole African nationalist writer^{[Jahn]}
- Delia Jarrett-Macauley (living), academic and novelist
- Lemuel A. Johnson (1940/41–2002), poet and academic^{[Gikandi]} ^{[Killam & Rowe]}
- Eldred Durosimi Jones (1925–2020), academic and literary critic^{[Jahn]}
- Joseph Ben Kaifala (living), historian, memoirist and human rights activist
- Yulisa Amadu Maddy (1936–2014), playwright, novelist, and choreographer^{[Gikandi]} ^{[Jahn]} ^{[Killam & Rowe]}
- Ambrose Massaquoi (born 1964), poet, musician and educationist^{[Brown]}
- Augustus Merriman-Labor (1877–1919), later took the name Ohlohr Maigi, barrister, writer and munitions worker
- Abioseh Nicol (1924–1994), doctor and short story writer^{[Gikandi]} ^{[Jahn]} ^{[Killam & Rowe]}
- Lenrie Peters (1932–2009), poet also associated with The Gambia^{[Gikandi]}
- Ekundayo Rowe (born 1937), journalist and short-story writer^{[Jahn]}

== Somalia ==
- Abdi Sheik Abdi (1942–), U.S.-based writer
- Mohamed Diriye Abdullahi, linguist and translator
- Maxamed Daahir Afrax, novelist, playwright and critic
- Elmi Boodhari (1908–1940), poet
- Ayaan Hirsi Ali (1969–), feminist and anti-Islam activist
- Ahmed Ibrahim Artan, diplomat, author and politician
- Jaamac Cumar Ciise (c.1922–2014), historian of Somali oral literature
- Waris Dirie (1965–), model and autobiographical writer
- Salaan Carrabey (1864–1943), poet
- Cristina Ali Farah (1973–), poet and novelist
- Farah Nur (1862–1932), poet and warrior
- Hussein Hasan (d. 1910s), warrior and poet
- Nuruddin Farah (1945–), novelist^{[Killam & Rowe]}
- Hadrawi (1943–2022), poet
- Yaasiin Cismaan Keenadiid (1919–1988), literary scholar
- Abdi Kusow, scholar and writer
- Abdillahi Suldaan Mohammed Timacade (1920–1973), poet
- Nadifa Mohamed (1981–), novelist
- Gaariye (d. 2012), poet
- Mohamed Haji Mukhtar (1947–), historian and scholar
- Rageh Omaar (1967–), journalist
- Abdi Ismail Samatar (1950–), geographer
- Ahmed Ismail Samatar (1950–), writer and academic
- Dada Masiti, Ashraf poet, mystic and Islamic scholar
- Said S. Samatar (1943–2015), scholar and writer
- Cali Xuseen Xirsi (1946–2005), poet
- Shadya Yasin (1983/4–), poet

== South Africa ==
See: List of South African writers

== Sudan ==
See: List of Sudanese writers

== Swaziland ==
- Modison Salayedvwa Magagula (1958–), playwright^{[Gikandi]}
- Stanley Musa N. Matsebula (1958–), economist and writer^{[Gikandi]}
- Elias Adam Bateng Mkhonta (1954–2001), novelist^{[Gikandi]}
- Sarah Mkhonza (1957–), novelist, short story writer and journalist^{[Gikandi]}
- Gladys Lomafu Pato (1930–), short story writer^{[Gikandi]}

== Tanzania ==
See: List of Tanzanian writers

== Togo ==
- Jeannette D. Ahonsou (1954–2022), novelist
- Gad Ami (born 1958), novelist
- David Ananou (1917–2000), novelist
- Félix Couchoro (1900–1968), novelist, also connected with Benin^{[Gikandi]} ^{[Killam & Rowe]}
- Yves-Emmanuel Dogbé (1939-2004), writer, philosopher, sociologist, and educator.
- Richard Dogbeh, also connected with Benin, Senegal and Côte d'Ivoire (1932–2003), novelist and educator
- Kossi Efoui (born 1962), playwright^{[Gikandi]}
- Christiane Akoua Ekue (born 1954), French-language novelist
- Pyabelo Chaold Kouly (born 1943), autobiographical writer and novelist
- Tété-Michel Kpomassie (born 1941), explorer and writer
- Farida Nabourema (born 1990), human rights activist, writer and blogger
- Stanislas Ocloo (died 2010), journalist
- Senouvo Agbota Zinsou (born 1946), playwright and short story writer^{[Gikandi]}

== Tunisia ==
See: List of Tunisian writers

== Uganda ==
See: List of Ugandan writers

== Western Sahara ==
- Mohamed Fadel Ismail Ould Es-Sweyih (1958–2002), journalist and politician
- Ahmed Baba Miské (1935–2016), writer, diplomat and politician

== Zambia ==
- Ellen Banda-Aaku (1965–), fiction, children's books
- Jack Avon (1967–), non-fiction, business books
- Enoch Kaavu, first Zambian novelist
- Stephen Mpashi, prolific Bemba writer
- Kenneth Kaunda (1924–2021), nationalist and writer^{[Gikandi]}
- Chibamba Kanyama (1965–), journalist and business writer
- Andreya Sylvester Masiye (1922–?), diplomat and novelist
- Dominic Mulaisho (1933–2014), novelist^{[Gikandi]} ^{[Killam & Rowe]}
- Charles Mwewa, poet and non-fiction writer
- Princess Zindaba Nyirenda, novelist
- Field Ruwe (1955–), educator, historian, media practitioner, author (fiction and non-fiction)
- Namwali Serpell (1980–), fiction
- Monde Sifuniso (1944–), editor, publisher, author (fiction and non-fiction)
- Binwell Sinyangwe (1956–)

== Zimbabwe ==
See: List of Zimbabwean writers

== See also ==
- African Writers Series
- Lists of authors
- International Research Confederacy on African Literature and Culture
- List of Latin American writers
