= List of writers by name: N =

The following is a List of writers by name whose last names begin with N:

Abbreviations: ch = children's; d = drama, screenwriting; f = fiction; nf = non-fiction; p = poetry, song lyrics

== Na–Ng ==
- Abdul Rasheed Na'Allah (born 1962, Nigeria, nf/p)
- Ebrahim Nabavi (born 1958, Iran, nf)
- Thomas Nabbes (1605–1641, England, d)
- Vladimir Nabokov (1899–1977, Russia/US, f/nf)
- Daniel Naborowski (1573–1640, Poland-Lithuania, p)
- Farida Nabourema (born 1990, Togo, nf)
- Herbert Nachbar (1930–1980, Germany, f/d)
- Nada Inada (なだいなだ, 1929–2013, Japan, f/nf)
- Péter Nádas (born 1942, Hungary, f/d/nf)
- Ádám Nádasdy (1947–2026, Hungary, nf/p)
- Borbála Nádasdy (born 1939, Hungary/France, f/nf)
- Ladislav Nádaši-Jégé (1866–1940, Hungary/Slovakia, f/nf)
- Ira Nadel (born 1943, US/Canada, nf)
- Kolau Nadiradze (1895–1990, Russian E/USSR, p/nf)
- Sten Nadolny (born 1942, Germany, f)
- Knut Nærum (born 1961, Norway, nf)
- Azar Nafisi (born 1948, Iran/US, nf)
- Kafū Nagai (永井荷風, 1879–1959, Japan, f/nf/d)
- Michiko Nagai (永井路子, 1925–2023, Japan, f)
- Tatsuo Nagai (永井龍男, 1904–1990, Japan, f/nf)
- Kiran Nagarkar (1942–2019, India, f/d/nf)
- Hideo Nagata (長田秀雄, 1885–1949, Japan, p/d)
- Linda Nagata (born 1960, US, f)
- Mikihiko Nagata (長田幹彦, 1887–1964, Japan, p/d)
- Takashi (長塚節, 1879–1915, Japan, p/f)
- Yoshirō Nagayo (長与善郎, 1888–1961, Japan, f/d)
- John Nagenda (1938–2023, Uganda, f/p)
- Khosro Naghed (born 1950, Iran, nf)
- Ágnes Nemes Nagy (1922–1991, Hungary, p/nf/ch)
- Gáspár Nagy (1949–2007, Hungary, p)
- Lajos Parti Nagy (born 1953, Hungary, p/d/nf)
- László Nagy (1925–1978, Hungary, p/nf)
- Ata Nahai (born 1960, Iran, f/nf)
- Alice Nahon (1896–1933, Belgium, p)
- Beverley Naidoo (born 1943, S Africa/England, ch/nf)
- Sadeq Naihoum (1937–1994, Libya/Switzerland, nf)
- Tekkatho Phone Naing (1930–2002, Burma/Myanmar, f/p)
- Majid Naini (born 1963, Iran/US, nf)
- Shiva Naipaul (1945–1985, Trinidad/England, f/nf)
- V. S. Naipaul (1932–2018, Trinidad/England, f/nf)
- M. T. Vasudevan Nair ( 1933—2024, India, f/d)
- Naitō Jōsō (内藤丈草, 1662–1704, Japan, p)
- Naitō Torajirō (内藤虎次郎, 1866–1934, Japan, nf)
- Manuel Gutiérrez Nájera (1859–1895, p/f/nf)
- Kansuke Naka (中勘助, 1885–1965, Japan, f/nf)
- Kenji Nakagami (中上健次, 1946–1992, Japan, f/nf)
- Chūya Nakahara (中原中也, 1907–1937, Japan, p)
- Atsushi Nakajima (中島敦, 1909–1942, Japan, f)
- Ramo Nakajima (中島らも, 1952–2004, Japan, f/nf)
- Akio Nakamori (中森明夫, born 1960, Japan, nf)
- Shin'ichirō Nakamura (中村真一郎, 1918–1997, Japan, f/nf)
- Mitsuo Nakamura (中村光夫, 1911–1988, Japan, nf/d)
- Chie Nakane (中根千枝, 1926–2021, Japan, nf)
- Nakane Kōtei (中根香亭, 1839–1913, Japan, nf)
- Kōji Nakano (中野孝次, 1925–2004, Japan, f/nf)
- Gishū Nakayama (中山義秀, 1900–1969, Japan, nf)
- Tsuneko Nakazato (中里恒子, 1909–1987, Japan, f)
- Nakisanze Segawa (living, Uganda, p/f)
- Beverley Nambozo (living, Uganda, p/nf)
- Namık Kemal (1840–1888, Ottoman Empire, nf/d)
- Hans Daniel Namuhuja (1924–1998, SW Africa/Namibia, p)
- Glaydah Namukasa (living, Uganda, f/p)
- Guru Nanak (1469–1539, Delhi Sultanate/Mughal E, p/nf)
- Marja Bål Nango (born 1988, Norway, d)
- Nannayya (c. 11th c. CE, E Chalukya, p)
- Elizabeth Nannestad (born 1956, N Zealand, p)
- Twm o'r Nant (1739–1810, Wales, d), pseudonym of Thomas Edwards
- Sanjugo Naoki (直木三十五, 1891–1934, Japan, f), pseudonym of Sōichi Uemura (植村宗一)
- Susan Napier (born 1954, N Zealand, f)
- Sydney Elliott Napier (1870–1940, Australia, nf/p)
- R. K. Narayan (1906–2001, India, f/nf)
- Carmen Naranjo (1928–2012, Costa Rica, f/p/nf)
- José Narosky (born 1930, Argentina, nf)
- Narushima Ryūhoku (成島柳北, 1837–1884, Japan, nf)
- Adam Naruszewicz (1733–1796, Poland-Lithuania, p/nf/d)
- Jan Narveson (born 1936, Canada, nf)
- Ras Nas (living, Tanzania, p)
- Ali Mohaqiq Nasab (living, Afghanistan, nf)
- Alanna Nash (born 1950, US, nf)
- Ogden Nash (1902–1971, US, p)
- Thomas Nashe (1567 – c. 1601, England, f/p/d)
- Martha Nasibù (1931–2020, Ethiopia/France, nf)
- Imadaddin Nasimi (1369–1417, Azerbaijan/Mamluk Sultanate, p)
- Taslima Nasrin (born 1962, E Pakistan/India, nf/f)
- Raduan Nassar (born 1935, Brazil, f)
- Badia Hadj Nasser (born 1938, Tangier/France, f/nf)
- Momčilo Nastasijević (1894–1938, Serbia/Yugoslavia, p/f/d)
- Kinoko Nasu (奈須きのこ, born 1973, Japan, f)
- Melissa Nathan (1968–2006, England, f/nf)
- Ali Akbar Natiq (born 1974, Pakistan, f/p)
- Natsume Sōseki (夏目漱石, 1867–1916, Japan, f/nf)
- Sheila Natusch (1926–2017, N Zealand, nf)
- Gellu Naum (1915–2001, Romania, p/f/ch)
- Saint Naum (830–910, Bulgaria, nf), Naum of Ohrid
- Hakan Massoud Navabi (born 1990, Afghanistan/Canada, nf)
- Joe Navarro (born 1953, Cuba, nf)
- Marysa Navarro (born 1934, Spain, nf)
- Marguerite Naville (1852–1930, Switzerland, nf)
- Fariba Nawa (born 1973, Afghanistan/US, nf)
- Massoud Nawabi (1954–2010, Afghanistan, nf)
- Rajarshi Raghabananda Nayak (1938–2016, India, nf)
- James Nayler (1618–1660, England, nf)
- Avetis Nazarbekian (1866–1939, Iran/USSR)
- Peter Nazareth (born 1940, Uganda/US, f/d)
- Aquiles Nazoa (1920–1976, Venezuela, nf/p)
- Njabulo Ndebele (born 1948, S Africa, f/nf)
- Adja Ndeye Boury Ndiaye (born 1936, Senegal/Ivory Coast, ch)
- Marie NDiaye (born 1967, France, f/d)
- Tidiane N'Diaye (1950–2025, Senegal/France, nf/p)
- Donato Ndongo-Bidyogo (born 1950, Equatorial Guinea, nf)
- Mariama Ndoye (born 1953, Senegal/Tunisia, f)
- Echezonachukwu Nduka (born 1989, Nigeria, p/f/nf)
- Uche Nduka (born 1963, Nigeria/US, p/nf)
- Joseph Ndwaniye (born 1962, Rwanda, f/ch)
- John Neal (1793–1876, US, nf/f/p)
- Emma Neale (born 1969, N Zealand, f/p)
- Dejan Nebrigić (1970–1999, Yugoslavia, nf)
- Ion Neculce (1672–1744, Moldavia, nf)
- Mircea Nedelciu (1950–1999, Romania, f/nf)
- Kole Nedelkovski (1912–1941, Ottoman E/Bulgaria, p)
- Nedîm (c. 1681–1730, Ottoman E, p)
- Torborg Nedreaas (1906–1987, Norway, f/d)
- Mary Anna Needell (1830–1922, England, f)
- Violet Needham (1876–1967, England, ch)
- Henry Neele (1798–1828, England, p/nf)
- Betty Neels (1909–2001, England, f)
- José de Almada Negreiros (1893–1970, Portugal, f/d)
- Constantin Negruzzi (1808–1968, Moldavia/Romania, p/f/p)
- John Neihardt (1881–1863, US, nf/p)
- John R. Neill (1877–1943, US, ch)
- Philip Neilsen (living, Australia, p/ch/nf)
- Shaw Neilson (1872–1940, Australia, p)
- Carlos Nejar (born 1939, Brazil, p/nf)
- Fabrício Carpi Nejar (born 1972, Brazil, p/nf)
- Gert Vlok Nel (born 1963, S Africa, p)
- Philip Nel (born 1969, US, nf)
- Lino Nelisi (born 1952, Niue/N Zealand, ch)
- Émile Nelligan (1879–1941, Canada, p)
- Esther Nelson (1810–1843, Isle of Man, p)
- Jandy Nelson (born 1965, US, f/ch)
- Marilyn Nelson (born 1946, US, p/ch)
- Tracy Nelson (born 1963, US, nf/d)
- Bhalchandra Nemade (born 1938, India, f/p/nf)
- Božena Němcová (1820–1862, Austrian E, f/ch), born Barbora Novotná
- Alexander Nemerov (born 1963, US, nf)
- Howard Nemerov (1920–1991, US p)
- Vitorino Nemésio (1901–1978, Portugal)
- István Péter Németh (born 1960, Hungary, p/nf)
- László Németh (1901–1975, Hungary, f/d/nf)
- Irène Némirovsky (1903–1942, France, f), Holocaust victim
- Matija Nenadović (1777–1854, Ottoman E/Serbia, nf)
- Rajat Neogy (1939–1995, Uganda/US, nf)
- Mary Edith Nepean (1876–1960, Wales, f)
- Cornelius Nepos (c. 110–25 BCE, Roman Republic, nf)
- Salomėja Nėris (1904–1945, Russian E/Soviet Union, p)
- Jan Neruda (1834–1891, Austrian E, nf/p)
- Pablo Neruda (1904–1973, Chile, p)
- Gérard de Nerval (1808–1855, France, f/p)
- Amado Nervo (1870–1919, Mexico, p/nf)
- Adalgisa Nery (1905–1980, Brazil, p/nf)
- Neşâtî (died 1674, Ottoman E, p)
- E. Nesbit (1858–1924, England, ch/f/p)
- Jeffrey A. Nesbit (living, US, f)
- Jo Nesbø (born 1960, Norway, f/ch)
- Nescio (1882–1961, Netherlands, f), pseudonym of Jan Hendrik Frederik Grönloh
- Aziz Nesin (1915–1995, Turkey, f/nf)
- Patrick Ness (born 1971, US/England, f/ch)
- Åse-Marie Nesse (1934–2001, Norway, p/nf)
- Håkan Nesser (born 1950, Sweden, f)
- Johann Nestroy (1801–1862, Austria, d)
- Agostinho Neto (1922–1979, Angola, p/nf)
- João Cabral de Melo Neto (1920–2009, Brazil, p/nf)
- João Simões Lopes Neto (1865–1916, Brazil, f/nf)
- Andrés Neuman (born 1977, Argentina/Spain, f/nf/p)
- Alfred Neumann (1895–1952, Germany/Switzerland, f/p/d)
- Jill Adelaide Neville (1932–1997, Australia/England, f/d/p)
- John Newbery (1713–1767, England, ch)
- Henry Newbolt (1862–1938, England, p/f/nf)
- P. H. Newby (1918–1997, England, f)
- John Henry Newman (1801–1890, England, nf/p)
- Nanette Newman (born 1934, England, ch/nf)
- Isaac Newton (1642–1726/1727, England, nf)
- John Newton, (born 1959, N Zealand, p/f/nf)
- Lily Newton (1893–1981, England/Wales, nf)
- Nerida Newton (born 1972, Australia, f)
- Nezahualcoyotl (tlatoani) (1402–1472, Mexico, p)
- Aimee Nezhukumatathil (born 1974, US, p/nf)
- Friedrich Neznansky (1932–2013, USSR/Russia, f)
- Celeste Ng (伍綺詩, born 1980, US, f)
- Patrice Nganang (born 1970, Cameroon/US, f)
- Emmanuel Ngara (living, S Rhodesia/Zimbabwe, nf)
- Lauretta Ngcobo (1931–2015, S Africa, f/nf)
- Honorine Ngou (born 1957, Gabon, f/nf)
- Ngugi wa Mirii (1951–2008, Kenya/Zimbabwe, d)
- Ngũgĩ wa Thiong'o (1938–2025, Kenya, f/d/nf), born James Ngugi
- Mũkoma wa Ngũgĩ (born 1971, Kenya/US, p/nf)
- Nguyễn Du (阮攸, 1766–1820, Vietnam, p)

== Ni–Nz ==
- Ni Kuang (倪匡, 1935–2022, China/Hong Kong, f/nf)
- Brenda Niall (born 1930, Australia, nf)
- Ian Niall (1916–2002, Scotland/England, f), born John Kincaid McNeillie
- Djibril Tamsir Niane (1932–2021, Guinea, nf/d/f)
- Mame Bassine Niang (1951–2013, Senegal, nf)
- Barrie Phillip Nichol (1944–1988, Canada, p/f)
- Nicholas I of Montenegro (1841–1921, Montenegro, nf)
- Thomas Evan Nicholas (Niclas y Glais) (1879–1971, Wales, p/nf)
- John Graham Nicholls (1929–2023, England/Switzerland, nf)
- Marjory Nicholls (1890–1930, N Zealand, p)
- Sally Nicholls (born 1983, England, ch)
- Aidan Nichols (born 1948, England, nf)
- Beverley Nichols (1898–1983, England, f/d/nf)
- Grace Nichols (born 1950, Guyana/England, p)
- Christopher Robert Nicholson (born 1945, S Africa, nf)
- Joyce Nicholson (1919–2011, Australia, nf)
- Norman Nicholson (1914–1987, England, p/f/d)
- William Nicholson (born 1948, England, d/f)
- Eckhart Nickel (born 1966, Germany/US, nf)
- C. W. Nicol (1940–2020, Wales/Japan, f/nf)
- Davidson Nicol (1924–1994, Sierra Leone, f/p/nf)
- Christoph Friedrich Nicolai (1733–1811, Germany, nf/f)
- Nicos Nicolaides (1884–1956, Greece/Egypt, nf/p)
- Nicomachus (c. 60 – c. 120 CE, Greece, nf)
- Ernst Elias Niebergall (1815–1843, Germany, nf/d)
- Reinhold Niebuhr (1892–1971, US, nf)
- Lorine Niedecker (1903–1970, US, p)
- Marlene van Niekerk (born 1954, S Africa, nf/f/p)
- Julian Ursyn Niemcewicz (1758–1841, Poland-Lithuania/France, p/d)
- Mikael Niemi (born 1959, Sweden, f/p)
- Friedrich Nietzsche (1844–1900, Germany, nf/p)
- Carel van Nievelt (1843–1913, Netherlands, f/nf), pseudonym Gabriël
- Luis López Nieves (born 1950, Puerto Rico, f/d)
- Nankichi Niimi (新美南吉, 1913–1943, Japan, f/nf/p)
- Martinus Nijhoff (1894–1953, Netherlands, p/nf)
- Niki Etsuko (仁木悦子, 1928–1986, Japan, f)
- Galin Nikiforov (born 1968, Bulgaria, f)
- Svetomir Nikolajević (1844–1922, Serbia/Yugoslavia, nf)
- Jovan Nikolić (born 1955, Yugoslavia/Germany, nf)
- Jovanka Nikolić (1952–2017, Yugoslavia/Serbia, ch)
- Lisa de Nikolits (living, S Africa/Canada, f)
- Gottskálk grimmi Nikulásson (1469–1520, Iceland, nf)
- Deborah Niland (born 1950, Australia, ch)
- Rudolf Nilsen (1901–1929, Norway, p)
- Tove Nilsen (born 1952, Norway, f/ch/nf)
- Peter Nilson (1937–1998, Sweden, nf/f)
- Jenny Nimmo (born 1944, England/Wales, ch)
- P Moe Nin (1883–1940, Burma, nf)
- Bảo Ninh (born 1952, Vietnam, f/nf), pseudonym of Hoàng Ấu Phương
- Milica Ninković (1854–1881, Hungary/Serbia, nf)
- Esther Nirina (1932–2004, Mozambique, p)
- Hume Nisbet (1849–1923, Scotland/England, f/p/nf)
- Kitaro Nishida (西田幾多郎, 1870–1945, Japan, nf)
- Nishiyama Sōin (西山宗因, 1605–1682, Japan, p), born Nishiyama Toyoichi (西山豊一)
- Kyotaro Nishimura (西村京太郎, 1930–2022, Japan, f)
- Junzaburō Nishiwaki (西脇順三郎, 1894–1982, Japan, p/nf)
- Nishiyama Sōin (西山宗因, 1605–1682, Japan, p)
- Nisioisin (西尾維新, born 1981, Japan, f/d), pseudonym
- Mostafa Nissaboury (born 1943, Morocco, p)
- Judah ben Nissim (13th c., Morocco, nf)
- Nitobe Inazō (新渡戸稲造, 1862–1933, Japan, nf)
- Jirō Nitta (新田次郎, 1912–1980, Japan, f), pseudonym of Hiroto Fujiwara (藤原寛人)
- Sister Nivedita (1867–1911, Ireland/India, nf), born Margaret Elizabeth Noble
- Larry Niven (born 1938, US, f)
- Jennifer Niven (born 1968, US, f/ch)
- Ketty Nivyabandi (born 1978, Burundi/Canada, p/nf)
- Fumio Niwa (丹羽文雄, 1904–2005, Japan, f)
- Garth Nix (born 1963, Australia, ch)
- Carl Nixon (born 1967, N Zealand, f/d)
- Joan Lowery Nixon (1927–2003, US, f/ch)
- Thomas Nixon (born 1961, US, nf)
- Moeen Nizami (born 1965, Pakistan, p), born Ghulam Moeen Ud Din
- Lela B. Njatin (born 1963, Yugoslavia/Slovenia, f)
- Rebeka Njau (born 1932, Kenya, d/f)
- John Nkemngong Nkengasong (born 1959, Cameroon, d/f/p)
- Joseph Hanson Kwabena Nketia (1921–2019, Gold Coast/Ghana, nf)
- Innocent Masina Nkhonyo (born 1987, Malawi, f/p)
- Lewis Nkosi (1936–2010, S Africa, p/f/nf)
- Gamal Nkrumah (born 1959, Ghana/Egypt, nf)
- Kwame Nkrumah (1909–1972, Gold Coast/Ghana, nf)
- Nnamani Grace Odi (born 2001, Nigeria, f/nf)
- Yamilka Noa (born 1980, Cuba/Costa Rica, p)
- David Nobbs (1935–2015, England, f/nf/d)
- Shomu Nobori (昇曙夢, 1878–1958, Japan, nf)
- António Nobre (1867–1900, Portugal, p)
- Keiko Nobumoto (信本敬子, 1964–2021, Japan, d)
- Hideki Noda (野田秀樹, born 1955, Japan, d)
- Charles Nodier (1780–1844, France, f/nf)
- Yaeko Nogami (野上弥生子, 1885–1985, Japan, f)
- Rajko Petrov Nogo (born 1945, Yugoslavia/Serbia, p/nf)
- Gábor Nógrádi (born 1947, Hungary, d/p/ch)
- Fujio Noguchi (野口富士男, 1911–1993, Japan, f/nf), pseudonym of Fujio Hirai
- Yone Noguchi (野口米次郎, 1875–1947, Japan), pseudonym of Yonejirō Noguchi (野口米次郎)
- Constantin Noica (1909–1987, Romania, nf)
- Ethel Nokes (1883–1976, England, f/ch)
- Christopher Nolan (1965–2009, Ireland, p/f/nf)
- Cynthia Reed Nolan (1908–1976, Australia, nf)
- Frederick Nolan (1931–2022, England, f/nf)
- William F. Nolan (1928–2021, US, f)
- Fan Noli (1882–1965, Ottoman E/US, nf/p)
- Dieter Noll (1927–2008, Germany, f/nf)
- Ingrid Noll (born 1935, Germany, f)
- João Gilberto Noll (1946–2017, Brazil, f)
- Olga Nolla (1938–2001, Puerto Rica, p/f/nf)
- Hiroshi Noma (野間宏, 1915–1991, Japan, f)
- Masahiko Nomi (能見正比古, 1925–1981, Japan, nf)
- Kodō Nomura (野村胡堂, 1882–1963, Japan, f/nf)
- Jeff Noon (born 1957, England, f/d)
- Oodgeroo Noonuccal (1920–1993, Australia, p/nf)
- Farish A. Noor (born 1967, Malaysia, nf/f)
- Cees Nooteboom (1933–2026, Netherlands, f/p/nf)
- Sigurður Nordal (1886–1974, Iceland, nf)
- Hedvig Charlotta Nordenflycht (1718–1763, Sweden, p)
- Eiríkur Örn Norðdahl (born 1978, Iceland, p/f/nf)
- Óttar M. Norðfjörð (born 1980, Iceland, f/p)
- Sven Nordqvist (born 1946, Sweden, ch)
- Adolf Noreen (1854–1925, Sweden, nf)
- Lawrence Norfolk (born 1963, England, f)
- Howard Norman (born 1949, US, f)
- John Norman (born 1931, US, f/nf)
- Philip Norman (born 1943, England, f/nf/d)
- Regine Normann (1867–1939, Norway, f/ch)
- William Edward Norris (1847–1925, England, f)
- Andrew Norriss (born 1947, England, ch/d)
- Harold Norse (1916–2009, US, p/f)
- Marlene Norst (1930–2010, Australia, nf)
- Grace May North (1876–1960, US, ch)
- Jessica Nelson North (1891–1988, US, f/p/ch)
- Sterling North (1906–1974, US, nf/f/ch)
- Harry Northup (born 1940, US, p)
- Arthur Nortje (1942–1970, S Africa/England, p)
- Andre Norton (1912–2005, US, f), pseudonym of Alice Mary Norton
- Caroline Norton (1808–1877, England, nf/d/f)
- Mary Norton (1903–1992, England, ch)
- Cyprian Norwid (1821–1883, Russian E/France, p/d)
- Akiyuki Nosaka (野坂昭如, 1930–2015, Japan, f/p)
- Nikolay Nosov (1908–1976, Russian E/USSR, ch)
- Hans Erich Nossack (1901–1977, Germany, f/nf/p/d)
- Christine Nöstlinger (1936–2018, Austria, ch)
- Amélie Nothomb (born 1966, Belgium, f)
- Alice Notley (born 1945, US, p/nf)
- Alan E. Nourse (1928–1992, US, f/ch)
- Henri Nouwen (1932–1996, Netherlands/Canada, nf)
- Joanne Nova (born 1967, Australia, nf/ch)
- Helga M. Novak (1935–2013, Germany/Iceland, f/nf)
- Michael Novak (1933–2017, US, f/nf)
- Anna Novakov (born 1959, Yugoslavia/US, nf)
- Aleksandar Novaković (born 1975, Yugoslavia/Serbia, f/d)
- Duško Novaković (born 1948, Yugoslavia/Serbia, p)
- Mirjana Novaković (born 1966, Yugoslavia/Serbia, f)
- Stojan Novaković (1842–1915, Serbia, nf)
- Novalis (1772–1801, Germany, p/nf), pseudonym of Georg Philipp Friedrich Freiherr von Hardenberg
- Ivor Novello (1893–1951, Wales/England, d)
- Salvador Novo (1904–1974, Mexico, p/nf)
- Franciszek Nowicki (1864–1935, Austrian E/Poland, nf/f/p)
- Alfred Noyes (1880–1958, England, p/nf/d)
- Michael B. Nsimbi (1910–1994, Uganda, p)
- Jason Ntaro (living, Uganda, p)
- Richard Carl Ntiru (born 1946, Uganda, p/d/f)
- U Nu (1907–1995, Burma/Myanmar, nf/f)
- Benjamin Nugent (living, US, f/nf)
- Muhammad Ibrahim Nugud (1930–2012, Sudan/England, nf)
- Princess Nukata (額田王, fl. 17th c., Japan, p), also Nukata no Ōkimi
- Laura Numeroff (born 1953, US, ch)
- Pedro Nunes (1502–1578, Portugal, nf)
- Sigrid Nunez (born 1951, US, f/nf)
- Malla Nunn (born 1963, Australia, f)
- Helvi Nuorgam-Poutasuo (1943–2017, Norway, nf)
- Farah Nur (1862–1932, Isaaq Sultanate/Somaliland, p)
- Sevinj Nurugizi (born 1964, Soviet U/Azerbaijan, ch)
- Branislav Nušić (1864–1938, Serbia/Yugoslavia, d/nf/f)
- Martina Nwakoby (born 1937, Nigeria/US, ch)
- Nkem Nwankwo (1936–2001, Nigeria/US, f/p)
- Flora Nwapa (1931–1993, Nigeria, f)
- Adaobi Tricia Nwaubani (born 1976, Nigeria, f/nf)
- Nat Nwe (1933–2011, Burma/Myanmar, f/p)
- San San Nweh (born 1945, Burma/Myanmar, f/nf)
- Onyeka Nwelue (born 1988, Nigeria, nf/f)
- Chuma Nwokolo (born 1963, Nigeria, f/p)
- Chacha Nyaigotti-Chacha (born 1952, Kenya, d/nf)
- Stanley Nyamfukudza (born 1951, S Rhodesia/Zimbabwe, nf/f)
- Freedom Nyamubaya (c. 1958–2015, S Rhodesia/Zimbabwe, p)
- Nyana Kakoma (living, Uganda, f/nf)
- Sulayman S. Nyang (1944–2018, Gambia, nf)
- Julia Nyberg (1784–1854, Sweden, p), pseudonym Euphrosyne
- Naomi Shihab Nye (born 1952, US, p/f)
- Philip Nye (c. 1595–1672, England, nf)
- Robert Nye (1939–2016, England, p/f/ch)
- Monica Arac de Nyeko (born 1979, Uganda, f/p/nf)
- Sibusiso Nyembezi (1919–2000, S Africa, f/p/nf)
- Julius Nyerere (1922–1999, Tanzania, nf)
- Anne-Pia Nygård (born 1977, Norway, nf)
- Olav Nygard (1884–1924, Norway, p)
- Kevin Nyiau (born 1986, Malaysia, nf)
- Saw Mon Nyin (1919–2011, Burma/Myanmar, nf)
- Zindaba Nyirenda (living, Zambia, nf)
- Vincent de Paul Nyonda (1918–1995, Gabon, d)
- Arild Nyquist (1937–2004, Norway, f/p/ch)
- Khin Maung Nyunt (born 1929, Burma/Myanmar, nf)
- Onuora Nzekwu (1928–2017, Nigeria, f)
