= Michael Mosoeu Moerane =

South African composer (1904–1980)

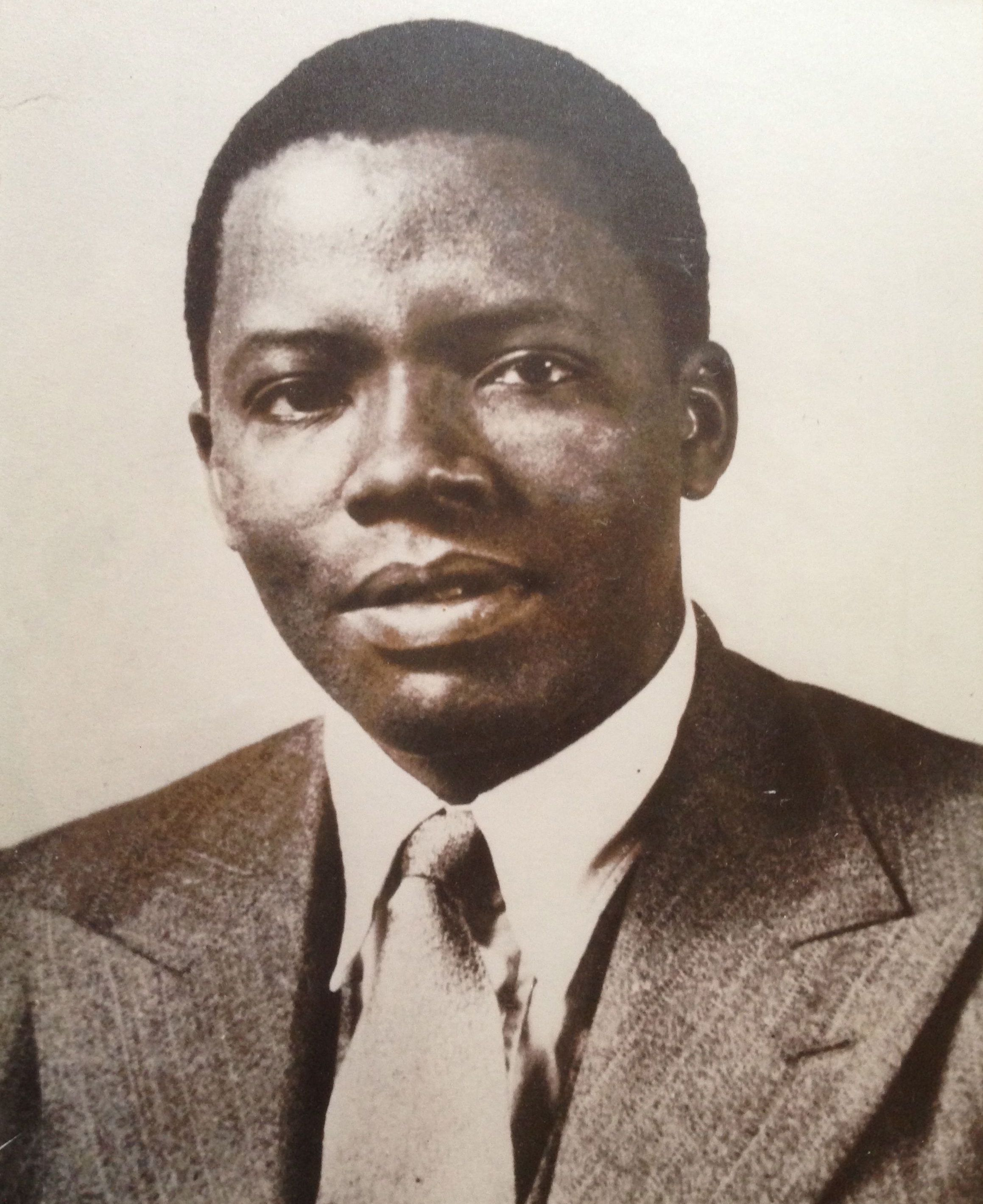
- Michael Mosoeu Moerane, circa 1926

Background information
- Born: 20 September 1904; Mangoloaneng, Elundini, Eastern Cape, South Africa
- Died: 27 January 1980 (aged 75) Bloemfontein, South Africa
- Genres: Choral, Orchestral
- Occupation: Teacher
- Instruments: Piano, violin

Michael Mosoeu Moerane (20 September 1904 – 27 January 1980) was a choral music composer and the first black South African to write a symphonic poem in 1941.

== Early life ==
Moerane was a member of the Bafokeng, specifically the Mahoona clan – traditional healers whose history can be traced back several centuries through the lineage of the Bakwena royal family. He was born on 20 September 1904 in Mongoloaneng, a village in the Mount Fletcher district of South Africa near the border of Lesotho. He was one of seven children born to Eleazar Jakane Moerane and his wife Sofi Majara, whose grandparents were disciples of Moshoeshoe I and were among the first Basotho converts to Christianity. Moerane's parents were African landowners and members of the Paris Evangelical Missionary Society Church. Most of their abundant arable land and livestock, however, had disappeared by the 1990s, owing largely to the apartheid government's Homelands policy. The family home contained a harmonium, which was probably the first instrument that Moerane learnt to play, and his siblings all became professionals, like himself. The two most celebrated are his younger brother, Manasseh Tebatso Moerane, the educationist, cultural activist and journalist who became an Editor of The World newspaper, and his younger sister, Epainette Mbeki, one of the first women to join the Communist Party of South Africa, a stalwart community activist and promoter of women's development, and mother to a future President of South Africa, Dr. Thabo Mbeki.

== Education ==
His father's primary school provided Moerane's first elementary schooling, after which he attended Mariazell Mission School in Matatiele and then Morija Training Institute in Lesotho. In 1924, Moerane completed Standard VIII at Lovedale Mission High School in Alice, South Africa, and by 1926 he had obtained a certificate of Matriculation at the South African Native College (later called the University of Fort Hare) while simultaneously completing a high school teaching diploma at Lovedale Training School. Moerane registered for a Bachelor of Music degree part-time in 1930 through Rhodes University College, which was at that time a satellite campus of the University of South Africa (Unisa). He completed the B.Mus. in 1941, a degree still modelled in those days on the Oxbridge & London B.Mus. degree courses. According to his Student Record, which was obtained by Professor Percival Kirby from Unisa in 1962, Moerane passed the 1st-year subjects "History of Music, Harmony & Counterpoint and Elements of Sound" in 1930, the 2nd-year subjects "Counterpoint, Score Reading and Composition" in 1931, the 3rd-year subjects "Orchestration and Instrumentation", "Double Counterpoint and Fugue", "Advanced Composition" in 1933, and "Composition III", "Exercise". The Rhodes University Calendars for these years add more detail to the subjects that Moerane was expected to study, by himself, at home, which include aural training, dictation, writing in open score, melody harmonization, phrasing and form, analysis, history of western music from 1700 to 1900 and elements of acoustics.

== Family life ==
In 1931, the year in which Moerane obtained a permanent post at Lovedale High School, he married Beatrice Betty Msweli, who had been a fellow student at Lovedale. Their first child, Mofelehetsi, was born at the end of 1931, followed by a daughter, Mathabo. A second son, Thuso, was born in Kroonstad, where Mrs Moerane was teaching, in 1935. The couple had two more daughters, Hadieo and Sophie, and their last child, a son, Thabo, was born in 1947. By that time, they were living in Queenstown, South Africa (now called Komani). Mrs. Moerane was known in the extended family for her domestic skills, and indeed she wrote the lyrics to one of Moerane's songs which is set for three female voices and appropriately called, "Ma-Homemakers" (Homemakers) and, because one of the verses is in isiXhosa, Ingoma-ka-zenzele. The Queenstown years, when the Moeranes' children were growing up, were evidently characterised by his strict discipline, his insistence on their speaking Sesotho at home rather than his wife's home language, isiXhosa, which is also the local language, and his dislike of the influence of jazz culture on his children. The Moeranes' next-door neighbours in Scanlen Street were Todd Matshikiza, the jazz composer and pianist, and beyond that another jazz musician. In addition to jazz and choral music, the Eastern Cape was also known for its anti-apartheid activities and leaders, and Moerane himself was actively involved through his membership of the Cape African Teachers Association (CATA). It is also well known that he sympathised with the policies of the Pan-African Congress (PAC) rather than the African National Congress (ANC), and that he supported the Non-European Unity Movement (NEUM). After he had left Queenstown, Moerane's son, Thuso, was served with a banning order on 15 February 1966, under which he was "prohibited under the Suppression of Communism Act from attending gatherings for five years", and the family home, 10 Scanlen Street, was bulldozed down under apartheid's Group Areas Act. Mr. and Mrs. Moerane became somewhat estranged from each other during the 1960s and Mrs. Moerane returned to live in Queenstown, where she died a few months after her husband, in 1980.

== Teaching ==
Moerane officially taught History, Latin, Mathematics, Sesotho, Commercial Arithmetic or English, depending on the position he held, since Music was not a subject in most African schools. He held posts at St. John's College Mthatha (1922), Lovedale's High School, Training School and Practising Schools (1920s–1930s), Basutoland High School (1939–1940), Queenstown Secondary School (1942–1957), Mfundisweni Teacher Training Institute Mpondoland (1958–1959), and Peka High School Lesotho from 1961 until his retirement in the late 1960s. After he retired, Moerane helped with the establishment of the Department of Music at the new National Teachers Training College in Maseru, capital of the (then) newly independent sovereign state of Lesotho. Moerane's position in Queenstown was jeopardised by his "deep non-racialist" beliefs and his involvement with CATA, so that he became "a thorn in the flesh of the Education Department who decided to force him to retire prematurely". He was thus forced to leave South Africa. Peka High School was situated in the Leribe district of northern Lesotho, known for its strong support of the left-wing Basutoland Congress Party (BCP), which was directly opposed to the policies of the Basutoland National Party (BCP), led by Leabua Jonathan, who seized power in a coup in 1970 until he himself was removed in a coup in 1986. In other words, Moerane moved from one turbulent political climate to another. At Peka, where Moerane "talked openly about his support for the BCP", he left an indelible impression on his students, among whom was the novelist Zakes Mda. In both Peka and Queenstown, Moerane conducted a small family (later school) orchestra, because he had received a donation of instruments in the early 1950s; he arranged and wrote music for them and taught all the instruments himself; the group was known as the "African Springtime Orchestra". He provided music education at home throughout his life to students and members of his community, he conducted and adjudicated choirs, put on concerts and musical theatre productions, and all in all, as his brother M.T. Moerane put it when the family raised Moerane's tombstone in 1988, despite the lack of formal music education for Africans, Moerane "trained thousands of music teachers-to-be", above all through his own compositions, which thousands of choristers knew and loved.

== Compositions ==
Moerane composed more than 80 works, the majority of them fairly short pieces for a cappella choir, of which 50 choral works and the symphonic poem have survived. During his lifetime he was known by only a handful of choral pieces; the remainder (of the 50) were brought to light long after his death. The manuscript score of his symphonic poem, Fatše La Heso (My Country), survived largely because of the efforts by Percival Kirby to have it donated to Rhodes University Library. Many other works in manuscript or typescript (written in tonic solfa notation) survived thanks to their careful curation by Moerane's sons: first Thabo, and then after his death in 2006, Thuso, after whose death in 2021 they passed into the hands of his grandson, Tsepo. Like thousands of other works written by hundreds of composers in southern African in tonic solfa notation, Moerane's choral works were composed for school or church choirs and choral competitions, their performance history going largely unrecorded with music copied and distributed informally. This, together with the fragility of the manuscripts, the tonic sol-fa notation, and the fact that Moerane used indigenous African languages, Sesotho and isiXhosa for most of his lyrics, prompted the publication in 2020 of a complete edition of his music under the auspices of the Africa Open Institute for Music, Research and Innovation at Stellenbosch University, with lyrics translated and choral scores transcribed into staff notation. The choral works are grouped here according to voicing – SATB, SAA, SA – but in reality, many of them have subdivided voices; moreover, Moerane's music reflects his command of a range of melodic, harmonic and contrapuntal textures and styles. He registered for royalty purposes with the Southern African Music Rights Organisation (SAMRO) in 1973, and his music is still (2022) in copyright. A complete Catalogue of Works by M. M. Moerane was published by African Composers Edition in 2020. Very few of Moerane's manuscripts and typescripts were dated, and so it is only through circumstantial evidence (when a work was prescribed for a competition, for example) that assigning dates to his works becomes possible. Details about individual works and approximate dates ascertained through interviews, are available on individual scores in the critical edition online.

== Sacred choruses ==
Approximately eight works are written in the style of church hymns, anthems or sacred songs: these include "Tsatsi La Pallo" (Judgement Day), "Ruri!" (Truly!), and "Ngokuba Sizalelwe Umtwana" (For Unto Us a Child is Born), which uses the same text from Isaiah 9, verse 6, as Handel's "For Unto Us a Child is Born" from Messiah, and which opens with a unison quotation from the old Xhosa melody by Ntsikana Gaba, "Ntsikana's Bell". Moerane's other religious works are his eight arrangements of spirituals in English, among which is a rousing eight-part setting of "Go Tell It on the Mountain".

== Songs about traditional life ==
Moerane wrote about 18 songs in which traditional and community life feature strongly, and which sometimes include aspects of Sotho traditional music in their rhetorical style, pentatonicism, or bi-chordal harmonies. One of them, "Morena Tlake" (King Vulture), quotes from Enoch Sontonga's anthem "Nkosi Sikelel' iAfrika" at the end. Like most other southern African choral music composers Moerane wrote his own lyrics, but unlike most, he also drew heavily on literary texts, especially from Sesotho writers Bennett Makalo Khaketla, Ntšeliseng 'Masechele Khaketla, 'Mabasiea Jeannette Mahalefele, and Kemuel Edward Ntsane. Songs based on the latter's poems – "Mohokare" (The Caledon River), "Ngeloi La Me" (My Angel), "Paka-Mahlomola" (Creator of Sorrow), and "Satane A Tšeha" (The Devil Laughed) – are full of references to the hardship of migrant labour. In "Paka-Mahlomola", for example, written for female voices in a sombre homophonic style, almost like a lament, the river symbolises the damage people suffered as a result of crossing it to seek work on the mines, far from family and community. The river sings a different tune, is the song's message, depending on which side of it you live.

== Love songs ==
Perhaps Moerane's greatest achievements, musically, are his love songs, of which the two best known are "Della" and "Sylvia", which are also among only five that have isiXhosa texts while all his other extant songs are in English or Sesotho. "Barali ba Jerusalema" (Daughters of Jerusalem), based on an extract from the Song of Songs and containing the phrase (here translated into English), "do not stare at me because I am black", is difficult to classify, since it has a biblical text, racial undertones, and yet is decidedly about love; and as in so much of Moerane's writing, its musical style is Afro-modern. The lyrics of "Della" are adapted from an isiXhosa poem by Sampson Mputa for which Moerane provides some of his richest and most stately contrapuntal writing. "Sylvia"'s long lyric poem by Moerane speaks fervently of love for a young woman who is about to depart (which in real life, she was); and to express such profound feelings, Moerane writes harmonies in the opening and closing sections that are almost Mahlerian, while the middle section is gently reminiscent of ragtime. One of the newly discovered love songs, "Mahakoe" (Jewels), is Moerane's most experimental work, its harmonies so chromatic that they are at times atonal. This suggests that the work may have been written during the period when Moerane was studying advanced chromatic harmony. The poem in Sesotho, written by Moerane, is clearly based on W. B. Yeats's "Aedh Wishes for the Cloths of Heaven", although it is darker in tone:

Hoja ke na le gauda,
Mahakoe a benyang, mahakoe,
gauda tsa bohlokoa, tse rorisehang!,
Empa joale ke mohloki,
Kea sitoa, Kea hloka,
Ke tsietsoe, Ke soabile,
Ke mohloki ea hlokang,
Mofumanehi ea sitoang.
'Me ke tla ala maotong a hao
litoro le maloro a moea le pelo.

If only I had gold,
And other precious metals,
high quality stones!
But I am destitute,
I am poor, I have no possessions,
I am in dire trouble, I am embarrassed,
A destitute among destitutes,
A poor indigent.
And so I will lay at your feet
all the dreams and nightmares of my soul. (Note: Translation by Mpho Ndebele.)

== Fatše La Heso (My Country) ==
Moerane's choral music is predominantly western in its phrasing and harmony: his son Thabo once commented in an interview that his father was Mozartean in melody and Wagnerian in harmony. At the same time, he was capable of using traditional sources, and he knew the folk music of what he called his country, Lesotho, very well. Although not Mosotho by birth, he was by culture and upbringing, and nowhere is this demonstrated more clearly than in his symphonic poem, Fatše La Heso (My Country). About 10 minutes long, it is scored for strings, wind, 4 horns, 3 trumpets, 3 trombones, tuba, bass drum, timpani, cymbals, triangle, piano and harp, and is based on what Moerane calls "thematic material derived from genuine African songs". Moerane writes out these four main themes in a short Preface to the score: "a transfiguration of a warrior song of my country"; a theme that "in its original form (which is quite pentatonic)" is "used by the reapers as they thresh the corn with their knob-kerries"; a "very free transformation of a cradle-song"; and a "hymn-tune used in this work to supply the harmonic structure" which "appears throughout the work and undergoes many changes". Moerane successfully maintains the diatonic African character of the first three themes within an overarching tonal and orchestral texture whose chromaticism and shifting key centres bespeak a decidedly late Romantic style, owing no doubt to the influence of his teacher, Friedrich Hartmann, who had been a student in Vienna of Alexander von Zemlinsky, brother-in-law of Arnold Schoenberg. The work was premiered by the BBC Symphony Orchestra in Bedford, north of London, in November 1944 with live radio broadcasts on the BBC Home Service and (in South Africa) on the (then) BBC African Service. An anonymous reviewer of the latter said that it "proved to be a work of warm vitality, strong in its rhythm and markedly African in its inspiration. It was not merely imitative of European music, and its melodic line seemed to derive directly from Bantu folk music, though refined by Western forms. The orchestration made particularly good use of the wind instruments". Fatše La Heso was performed live the following year, 1945, in Manchester at the opening of the Fifth (international) Pan African Conference, apparently at the request of the conference organiser, W.E.B. Du Bois. Through the Council on African Affairs, it was performed in New York in 1950, at a concert conducted by Dean Dixon that also included works by Fela Sowande, Amadeo Roldán, Samuel Coleridge-Taylor, Ulysses Kay, Ingram Fox, and William Grant Still. Proceeds of the concert were "used primarily to support a health clinic directed by an African physician in the poverty-ridden Ciskei Province in South Africa and to aid in promoting the work among African youth being carried on by Mr Moerane, in the same country, who sent the score of his tone poem to the Committee specifically for this concert". The work was performed and broadcast in 1973 by the National Symphony Orchestra of the SABC conducted by Edgar Cree, a recording released on CD in 1991.

== Publications ==
Very little of Moerane's music was published during his lifetime, not even the symphonic poem, which he tried (but failed) to get published. Lovedale Mission Press published two songs in Tonic sol-fa in 1938: "Liphala" (Whistles) and "Nobody Knows the Trouble I've Seen". SAMRO published "Barali ba Jerusalema" in 1998, and a version of "Della" in 2008. The African Composers Edition publication online presents each work separately as well as all 51 works in four volumes.

== Awards and honours ==
in 1937, Moerane was awarded £20 for the "May Esther Bedford Prize for musical composition", for a set of 10 piano pieces entitled Album for the Young, now lost; and on 14 December 2004, the Eastern Cape Department of Sport, Recreation, Arts and Culture presented a trophy posthumously, in honour of Moerane's "contribution to Xhosa culture".

== Death ==
Moerane experienced health problems some time in late 1979 or early 1980 and was admitted to Queen Elizabeth Hospital Maseru. From there he was transferred to Pelonomi Hospital Bloemfontein, where he died on 27 January 1980. He is buried in the graveyard near his former home in Tsifalimali, northern Lesotho.
