= List of Congolese writers =

List of Congolese writers may refer to:

- List of Democratic Republic of the Congo writers
- List of Republic of the Congo writers
