= Aïcha Fofana =

Malian translator and author

- Born: 1957; Bamako, Mali
- Died: 10 August 2003 (aged 45–46); Bamako, Mali
- Education: Lycée Notre-Dame
- Alma mater: Sorbonne
- Occupations: Translator and author
- Writing career
- Notable works: Marriage: on copie; La fourmilière: roman; Excellence on fait le ménage

Aïcha Aminata Laïla Fofana (1957 – 10 August 2003) was a Malian translator and author. With Marriage: on copie (1994), she became the first woman in Mali to publish a novel. A women's rights activist, her writings are aimed at improving the social conditions for women in Mali.

== Biography ==
Born in Bamako, Mali, in 1957, Aïcha Fofana was the daughter of Bénitiéni Fofana (1928–1991), who served as Mali's Minister of Health. After her primary school education in Bamako and in Bordeaux, France, she attended the Lycée Notre-Dame in Niger. She went on to study languages, first at the Sorbonne, then at the University of Mannheim, Germany, and at Oxford. With her command of French, German and English, she subsequently worked as a translator and interpreter.

Her first novel Marriage: on copie probes the conventional views of Malian women, telling the story of four of them who experience different problems owing to their varied ethnic backgrounds and status. By describing how the women resolve their marital problems, the novel sets out to show that Malian society is moving in the right direction. Her second novel La fourmilière (The Anthill) was published posthumously in 2006. It brings out the difficulties of Malian society as represented by the life of a large family. Her title is inspired by social structures which can be compared to those of a colony of ants.

Frustrated by the time taken to have books published, Fofana decided to turn to the theatre where she could rely on communicating her ideas much more quickly. In April 1997, her first play Excellence on fait le ménage was presented at Bamako's Cultural Centre. As it was critical of political corruption, it caused quite a stir, both among the actors and those who came to see it. Her second play, L'Africaine de Paris no 2, presented the following year, tells the story of a Malian who marries a local woman only to discover that his first wife, also an African whom he married in Paris, comes to claim him as her husband, upsetting the family environment.

Fofana is also remembered as a courageous advocate of women's rights. In 1998, she was a founding member of the Malian Association of Human Rights. Her writings are often centred on improving social conditions for African women.

Aïcha Fofana died unexpectedly in Bamako on 16 August 2003.

== Selected works ==
Novels

- Mariage, on copie. Editions Jamana. 1994. ISBN 2-910454-04-5.
- La fourmilière: roman. Editions "La Ruche à livres"/Librairie Traoré. 2006. ISBN 978-99952-50-06-5.

Plays

- Excellence on fait le ménage. University of Western Australia. 1997.
- L'Africaine de Paris no 2. University of Western Australia. 1998.
