= Ibn Razqa =

Mauritanian poet and scholar

Abdallah bin Muhammad bin al-Qdadi 'Abdallah (died 1731 CE), better known as Ibn Razqa, was a Mauritanian poet and scholar. He is sometimes referred to as "the father of the Mauritanian poets". He was the grandson of Abd-Allah al-Qadi (also known as Qadi Shinqit). A short biography of Ibn Razqa is contained in the beginning of Al-Wasit by Ahmad ibn al-Amin al-Shinqiti.
