= Chantal Magalie Mbazo'o-Kassa =

Gabonese poet and novelist (born 1967)

Chantal Magalie Mbazo'o-Kassa (born 23 March 1967) is a Gabonese poet and novelist.

== Life ==
Chantal Magalie Mbazo'o-Kassa was born on 23 March 1967 at Bitam to an ethnically Fang family in Woleu-Ntem Province. After secondary school and university studies at the University of Libreville, she studied journalism at the École supérieure de journalisme de Lille. Transferring to a degree in modern literature at Charles de Gaulle University – Lille III, she gained a doctorate from Cergy-Pontoise University in 1999 with a dissertation on the image of woman in the Gabonese novel. Returning to Gabon, she taught literature at the École Normale Supérieure before being appointed presidential adviser to the National Council of Communication (CNC). She simultaneously managed the publishing house Maison Gabonaise du Livre, and established its bookstore.

Mbazo'o-Kassa's first book of poetry, Noir, le sang de ma terre, won the Académie Francophone's first international poetry prize.

== Works ==
- Noir, le sang de ma terre, 1998.
- Sidonie, 2001
- Fam!, 2003
- La femme et ses images dans le roman gabonais, 2009. Preface by Bernard Mouralis.
