= Wafa Albueise =

Libyan lawyer

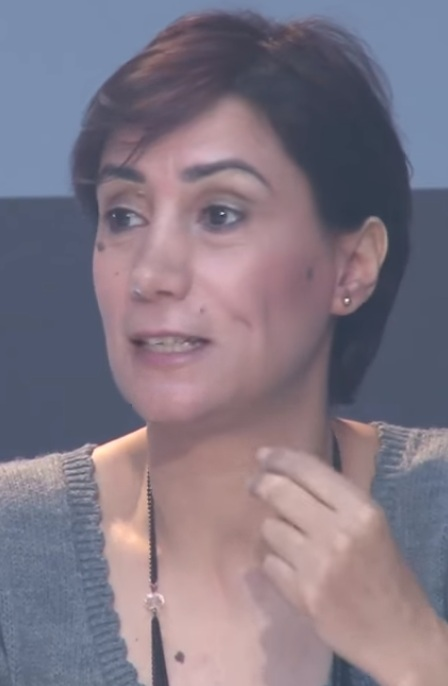
- Wafa Albueise, The Munathara Initiative, Nov 2014.
- Born: August 12, 1973 (age 53); Benghazi
- Education: Benghazi University
- Occupation: Lawyer

Wafa Albueise (born August 12, 1973, Benghazi) is a Libyan lawyer and writer.

== Early life and education ==
Wafa Albueise's family originated in a small village known as Abu-Essa at Zawia secondary education in Benghazi. Then, she studied law at Benghazi University. In 1996, she was granted a BA in Law. Then she obtained an MA in Criminal Law in 2003. The title of her thesis was The Notion of Potentiality and its Applications in Criminal law.

== Career ==
Between 1998 and 2008, she worked as a lawyer handling cases of civil law, commercial law, personal status and criminal issues. After completing training as a practitioner in the office of Mr. Salih Musa Al-Bar’asi, she started working independently. She also worked in Benghazi for one year as a lecturer in commercial law at the Higher Institute of Administrative and Financial Matters. Lately, she switched to literary writing as a profession and authored a number of controversial novels. One of these novels was published in Libya, titled liljuu’i wujuuhin Ukhraa (Hunger has Other Faces).

As a result of publishing this novel, she was accused of infidelity and subjected to a wide campaign of remonstrance by the ministry entrusted with supervision of religious and spiritual matters and by a number of imams (prayer leaders) at mosques in Benghazi as well as subjection to serious grievances during the rule of colonel "Muammar al-Gaddafi". This has obliged her to leave her homeland and apply for political asylum in Netherlands in 2008.

There, she volunteered to provide social consultations and help to Arab women refugees in Netherlands under the supervision of VluchtelingenWork Overijssel AZC Almelo at Almelo city. Since, she got married and still living in Netherlands.

== Professional experience ==
During 2013–2014, Albueise had worked at The Hague for the Organization of Gender Concerns International as a legal consultant and as an expert in the matters of gender and democracy. She also designed training programs to enhance the level of performance of 120 Libyan women and to support their endeavor to constitutionalise their rights after the fall of Gaddafi's regime in October 2011. She also designed another training program to boost and promote the level of performance of 60 members of those charged to write the constitution of Libya for the new government after Gaddafi. Furthermore, upon her own initiative, she drafted a complete transitional constitution for the new Libyan government and shared this project with political parties, non-governmental organizations, women associations and political elites in Libya on November 13, 2013.

On 2013, she was interviewed by the Arabic service of The Netherlands Radio station and by Ajyaal Tarabulus radio station together with Dr. Masoud Al-Kanuni to make comments on the project of the Libyan constitution and other legal issues.

Moreover, on 2015, she was re-interviewed by the Arabic service of The Netherland Radio station and the Libyan radio station Al-Wasat to comment and annotate on the deterioration of the rights of Libyan women after 17 February in Libya as presented in an episode titled “The Libyan Woman: past and future”.

In another radio programme, dedicated for the Arab youth to express themselves and their aspirations, presented and supervised by a lawyer named Bil-Abbas ben Kdeida, Mrs Al-Buseifi participated in the debate marked the thirteenth, about The Political Islam held in Tunis, in November 2013.

== Participations and publications ==
1. A novel titled: liljuu’i wujuuhin Ukhraa (Hunger has Other Faces), published by Al-Mutamar Magazine, Tripoli Libya, 2006.
2. A novel titled: Fursan al-Suaal (Knights of Cough) published by the author, 2009.
3. Na’thal (The Mad Dog), published by Daar ar-Ruwwaad, Tripoli – Libya, 2012.
4. Tulip Mania, published by Daar Arwiqah, Cairo – Egypt, 2013.
5. A manuscript of a fifth novel yet unpublished.

She writes literary articles and writes in politics, religious thought and publishes in different newspapers and electronic cites.

In April 2015, she was hosted by Al-Jazeera Arabic service in a programme titled al-Mashshaa’ from Tangier to Bagdad, to discuss her legal and literary works. In the summer of 2013, she participated in The Short Novel Seminar, at the city of khneifra in Morocco, the episode of the novelist Abdulla Al-Muttaqi.

Finally, she participated in a seminar in Brussels – Belgium, titled, fitnat al-Kitaba wa kitabat al-Fitnah (The Charm of Writing and Writing Intrigue) Winter, 2012.
