= Boubacar Hama Beidi =

Nigerien educator, author, and politician

Boubacar Hama Beïdi
- Born: 1951; Birni N'Gaouré, Boboye Department, Niger
- Occupation: Educator, author, politician

Boubacar Hama Beïdi (also Buubacar Hamma Beedi or Buubakar Hamma Beedi), born in 1951 in Birni N'Gaouré in the Boboye Department, is a Nigerien educator, author, and politician.

== Biography ==
Boubacar Hama Beïdi belongs to the Fula ethnic group. He is the son of a high dignitary at the royal court of the traditional chief of Birni N'Gaouré. He began his primary education in Birni N'Gaouré.

Hama Beïdi attended the National Lycée in the capital, Niamey, and graduated in 1967 with a baccalauréat. He dedicated most of his professional life to elementary education, working as a teacher, school principal, and school inspector, and also taught teacher training. From 1989 to 1991, he was a member of the National Assembly of Niger for the then-unified National Movement for the Development of Society (MNSD-Nassara). Boubacar Hama Beïdi has authored several writings in French and Fulfulde on the culture of the Fula people from his native Dallol Bosso region.

== Literary works ==
- —— (1991). La sagesse pratique. Proverbes en fulfulde transcrits, traduits, et expliqués (in French). Niamey: Publi Service. OCLC 27896226.
- —— (1993). Les Peuls du Dallol Bosso: coutumes et mode de vie (in French). Saint-Maur: Sépia. ISBN 978-2-907888-21-9. OCLC 33444672.
- —— (2003). Puri fulbe: maximes numériques peul. Niamey: Edition Albasa. ISBN 978-99919-0-047-6. OCLC 422489144.
- —— (2003). Taariki Fulb̳e Dallol. Collection Albasa. Niamey: Edition Albasa. ISBN 978-99919-0-049-0. OCLC 58918551.
- —— (2004). Contes et légendes peuls du Dallol Bosso (in French). Niamey: Nouvelle Imprimerie du Niger. OCLC 85765804.
- —— (2004). Jibi e fillaaji jalliniidi. Traditions et sagesses du Sahel. Niamey: Edition Albasa. ISBN 978-99919-43-60-2. OCLC 220738891.
- —— (2007). Durngol nder leydi dallol. Niamey: Gashingo. OCLC 954431667.
- —— (2008). La chefferie traditionnelle au Niger. Niamey: Ministère de l'education nationale. ISBN 978-99919-43-70-1. OCLC 654141510.
- —— (2008). Koowgal wodaabe. Le mariage chez les Wodaabe. Niamey: Albasa.
- —— (2009). Debbo pullo. Niamey: Gashingo. ISBN 9789991943695.
- —— (2009). La gouvernance locale au Niger : mythes et réalités. Niamey: Gashingo. OCLC 960973683.
- —— (2014). Banndi fulb̳e: Proverbes et devinettes peuls. Niamey: Gashingo. ISBN 9782919607167.
- —— (2014). Pulaaku. Collection Sagesse d'Afrique. Niamey: Editions Gashingo. ISBN 978-99919-49-51-2. OCLC 958938038.
- —— (2014). Les traces de ma mémoire: Souvenirs d'un instituteur nigérien. Preface by Jean-Dominique Pénel. Paris: L’Harmattan. ISBN 978-2-343-04199-5.
- —— (2017). Le bruissement des souvenirs. Récit d'un instituteur nigérien. Preface by Jean-Dominique Pénel. Paris: L’Harmattan. ISBN 978-2-343-10291-7.
