= Binwell Sinyangwe =

Zambian novelist (born 1956)

Binwell Sinyangwe (born 1956) is a Zambian novelist writing in English.

He studied industrial economics in Bucharest.

== Books ==
- Quills of Desire, Baobab Books, 1996. Republished by Heinemann (Public Policy Series), 2001
- A Cowrie of Hope, Heinemann (African Writers Series), 2000
