= Brigitte Yengo =

Sister Brigitte Yengo is a Roman Catholic Congolese nun. She is the head of Sister Yengo's Children, Inc., a charitable organization that assists people in sub-Saharan Africa.

== Life ==
In 1979, Yengo left Pointe Noire to study in Paris and Le Havre. She became a nun in 1981 and is a member of the congregation of the Sisters of Notre-Dame of the Rosary. She earned a chiropractic degree from the National University of Health Sciences (NUHS) in 1987 and a medical degree from the University of the Congo in 1991. In 1997, her hospital was bombed during civil war in the Congo. In 1998, Yengo began work in New York City with the children of incarcerated single mothers. She returned to the Republic of Congo in 2004 to set up her clinic and hospital.

== Foundation ==
Sister Yengo's Children is a 501(c)(3) organization formed to help those in need in sub-Saharan Africa, particularly in the Republic of the Congo. Under the leadership of Sister Brigitte Yengo, the organization raises funds to sustain the operation of the orphanage in Brazzaville, develop programs of self-sufficiency and procure equipment for victims of polio, blindness and other handicaps.

== Positions ==
Program Director of the Special Olympics for the Republic of the Congo and the Democratic Republic of the Congo – Special Olympics held in China 2008

== Works ==
Yengo's works include:

- Yengo, Brigitte (1981). De l'Afrique noire à l'Europe L'aventure d'une jeune religieuse noire [From Black Africa to Europe, The story of a young black nun]. Paris: CIEM. OCLC 461633709. 101 pages.
- Yengo, Brigitte (1985). Tears of Hope. Downers Grove: (unknown). OCLC 80908516. 47 pages.
- Yengo, Brigitte (1996). Sang et eau, le miroir reel de la paix, Cardinal Emile Biayenda, pensées et méditations. Brazzaville: FOCEB. OCLC 936561210. 51 pages.
