= Jean-Baptiste Abessolo =

Gabonese educator, writer (born 1932)

Jean-Baptiste Nguema Abessolo, also seen as J.-B. Abessolo-Nguema, (born 15 February 1932) is a Gabonese educator and writer.

Born at Oyem, he was educated there and at Libreville, then studied educational administration at École des Cadres Superieures in Brazzaville and the École Normale Supérieure at Mouyondzi.

He was a school administrator and inspector of primary schools from 1952 to 1982, interrupted only by a year in Paris (1960–61). In December 1982 he became director-general of the International Center for Bantu Civilizations in Libreville.

Abessole has published a number of short stories in both Gabon and France.

== Books ==
- Les Aventures de Biomo (IPN, 1975) ISBN 2-211-91774-7
- Contes de gazelle. Les Aventures de Biomo. L'Arbre du voyageur (Paris: L'Ecole, 1975) ISBN 978-2-211-91774-2
- Contes du Gabon (Paris: Cle International, 1981, 1991) ISBN 978-2-85319-229-3
