= Christine Adjahi Gnimagnon =

Beninese writer (born 1945)

Christine Adjahi Gnimagnon (born 1945) is an author from Benin.

Christine Adjahi was born in Zounzonmey, a small village of Abomey, Bénin.

== Publications ==
- Do Massé: Contes fons du Bénin. Paris: L'Harmattan, 2002. (124p.). ISBN 2-7475-3351-4.
- Le Forgeron magicien. Paris: L'Harmattan, 2008. (62p.). ISBN 978-2296049765.
