= Yves-Emmanuel Dogbé =

Togolese writer, philosopher, sociologist, and educator

Yves-Emmanuel Dogbé (10 May 1939 – 7 November 2004) was a Togolese writer, philosopher, sociologist, and educator.

== Life and works ==
Dogbé was born in Sa-Kpové, near Aného. He studied sociology in Paris and obtained his PhD from Paris Descartes University.

As the author of some fifteen major works, Dogbé has a prominent position among the French-speaking Togolese writers. He first made a name for himself with Affres, a book of poetry from 1966. His Fables africaines were written under the influence of Jean de La Fontaine. He wrote two socially engaged novels, La Victime about racism and Incarcéré about his imprisonment. Dogbé wrote several essays, most notably La crise de l’éducation (1975).

Dogbé was arrested in Lomé in 1977 for criticizing the economic policies of the regime of Gnassingbé Eyadéma. He returned to Paris, where he founded his own publishing company in 1979 and named it "Akpagnon" after his father. He published An Anthology of Togolese Poetry and Tales and Legends of Togo (in French and Ewe) in 1980. In the following years, his company published several Togolese authors and almost every work by Dogbé himself. He remained in exile until 1991, when he returned to Togo.

He died in Paris.

== Recognition ==
Dogbé received the lifetime award of Grand prix littéraire d'Afrique noire in 2002.

Historical Dictionary of Togo (1996) called him "Togo's greatest living writer."

== See also ==
- Gbagba A. Doussi, Untersuchungen zum Werk von Yves-Emmanuel Dogbé, Université de Mayence, 1987, 132 p. (university paper)
- Raymond O. Elaho, « Une lecture de Morne soliloque d'Yves-Emmanuel Dogbé », in Peuples Noirs/Peuples Africains, No. 47, September–October 1985, p. 151-158
- Raymond Osemwegie Elaho, Yves-Emmanuel Dogbé, ou, Le réveil des consciences, Ed. Akpagnon, Lomé, 2000, 117 p. ISBN 2-86427-044-7
- Abalo Essrom Kataroh, Yves-Emmanuel Dogbé : l'homme et l'œuvre, Ed. Akpagnon, Lomé, 1997, 157 p. ISBN 2-86427-041-2
- Sonia Le Pan, Yves-Emmanuel Dogbé : l'engagement d'un écrivain, Ed. Akpagnon, Lomé, 2001, 98 p. ISBN 2-86427-071-4
