= Charlotte-Arrisoa Rafenomanjato =

Malagasy writer

Charlotte-Arrisoa Rafenomanjato (1936 – 4 November 2008) was a Malagasy writer mainly writing in French.

== Life and career ==
The daughter of a doctor, she trained as a midwife and pediatric nurse. She lived in Antananarivo. Her writing included two collections of poetry and several short stories which were not published.

Rafenomanjato served as honorary president of the Indian Ocean Writers Society.

She died at the nuns' clinic in Ankadifotsy from pulmonary complications.

== Selected works ==
=== Plays ===
- Le prix de la Paix, received the Radio France Internationale prize in 1986, adapted for film and presented at the Festival of African Films in Montreal in 1988
- La Pécheresse, received the Radio France International prize in 1987
- Le Prince de l'Etang, translated into Italian and presented at the Festival of African Theatre in Italy, also presented at the Francophone Festival in Limoges in 1988
- L'Oiseau de Proie, presented at the French Madagascan Literature in Antananarivo in 1991
- Le Troupeau, translated into English and presented at the Festival of Contemporary Theatre in New York City

=== Novels ===
- Pétale Ecarlate (1990)
- Le Cinquième Sceau (1994)

=== Essays ===
- La Marche de la Liberté (1992)
