= Enoch Kaavu =

Zambian novelist (died by 1949)

- Died: by 1949
- Occupation: Writer
- Writing career
- Language: Ila, English
- Notable works: Namusiya Kumikoti (1949); Namusiya at the Mines (1949)

Enoch Kaavu (also rendered Enock Kaavu and E. A. Kaavu; died by 1949) was a writer from Northern Rhodesia (present-day Zambia). His only known work, published in Ila as Namusiya Kumikoti and in English as Namusiya at the Mines, is widely regarded as the first Zambian novel. Kaavu died before the book was published, and it was completed or translated for publication by Robinson Nabulyato, later Speaker of the National Assembly of Zambia.

== Life ==
Little is documented about Kaavu's life. He is described in one account as a teacher on the Copperbelt, based in Luanshya, where he is said to have met Robinson Nabulyato. Elsewhere, he is described as a clerk who worked on the mines. Nabulyato, who knew him, calls him "a brilliant scholar".

Kaavu wrote his novel during the 1940s, with sources giving 1943 or 1944 as the year of composition. He died before the book was published and, while his date of death is not recorded, by July 1949 a notice in African Affairs refers to "the late Enoch Kaavu".

== Works ==
Namusiya Kumikoti follows Namusiya, an orphan who leaves his idyllic village, Nalubanda, to seek work at the Copperbelt mines. The novel presents him being drawn into vice and deceit as well as suffering venereal disease and street violence. Namusiya is saved through his conversion to Christianity, eventually marrying a woman of his own Ila background rather than entering a mixed marriage, and returning home to warn fellow villagers against the dangers of town life.

The novel has been read as an early expression of a "localist" style in Zambian fiction, which set an idealised rural world against a corrupting urban one, and as being characteristic of pre-independence Zambian writing in that respect. It has also been used as a primary source in social histories of Copperbelt migrant labour, marriage and urban culture in the 1940s, offering an account of the conventions governing new arrivals to the mine towns.

Accounts of the book's language and authorship differ. Nabulyato's memoir states that Kaavu began the novel in English, that Nabulyato was asked to complete it in English after Kaavu's death, and that he also produced the Ila version. The volume's editor notes that the Joint Publications Bureau's annual report for 1949 gives the reverse account, describing an Ila original that Nabulyato was asked only to translate. Later scholarship has tended to follow the latter, treating the Ila text as the original. Published editions credit the English translation jointly to Nabulyato and Cecil Robert Hopgood, a missionary and Tonga-language linguist, though Nabulyato's own account of the work names only himself.

Both the Ila and English editions were published in 1949 by Longmans, Green & Co., in association with the Joint Publications Bureau of Northern Rhodesia and Nyasaland. A contemporary notice instead named the Lusaka Bookshop as publisher, at a price of two shillings. Other sources date the novel to 1946 or 1947 and attribute it to the Northern Rhodesia Literature Committee, the Bureau's forerunner. Writing in 1978, the historian J. K. Rennie noted that he had intended to take part in a translation of the novel, unaware that a published English version had appeared some thirty years earlier. The novel was out of print by 2008, despite efforts to persuade Nabulyato to issue a new edition.

Namusiya is often discussed alongside other early titles issued under the same Bureau arrangement, including Andreya Masiye's Tiyeni Kumudzi (1951) and I. H. Chipungu's Uluse Lwalile Nkwale (1956).

== Published work ==
- Kaavu, Enoch (1949). Namusiya kumikoti (in Ila). London; Cape Town: Longmans, Green & Co.
- Kaavu, Enoch (1949). Namusiya at the Mines. Translated by Robinson Nabulyato and Cecil Robert Hopgood. London; Cape Town: Longmans, Green & Co.

== Sources ==
- Chilala, Cheela (2013). "Through the Male Eyes: Gendered Styles in Contemporary Zambian Fiction". In Chirambo, Reuben Makayiko; Makokha, J. K. S. (eds.). Reading Contemporary African Literature: Critical Perspectives. Amsterdam: Rodopi. pp. 91–108. doi:10.1163/9789401209373_007. ISBN 978-94-012-0937-3.
- Chilala, Cheela (2018). "The Invisible Hand: Zambian Literature and (Self) Censorship from the Colonial to the Post-colonial Period". Multidisciplinary Journal of Language and Social Sciences Education. 1 (2): 38–62.
- Chilala, Cheela (2019). "Anglophone Zambian Prose Fiction: Tradition or Transition?". Hybrid Journal of Literary and Cultural Studies. 1 (1): 13–29.
- Kantini, Samson; Chilala, Cheela (2020). "A Critical Review of Ideological Trends in the Study of Zambian Literature in English". Journal of Law and Social Sciences. 4 (1): 14–27. doi:10.53974/unza.jlss.4.1.386.
- Larmer, Miles (2021). "Imagining the Copperbelts". Living for the City: Social Change and Knowledge Production in the Central African Copperbelt. Cambridge: Cambridge University Press. pp. 34–64. doi:10.1017/9781108973120.002. ISBN 9781108833158.
- Macola, Giacomo (2005). "Imagining Village Life in Zambian Fiction". Cambridge Anthropology. 25 (1): 1–10. JSTOR 23820717.
- Nabulyato, Robinson M. (2008). Macola, Giacomo (ed.). African Realities: A Memoir. Lusaka: The Lembani Trust.
- Parpart, Jane L. (1994). ""Where Is Your Mother?": Gender, Urban Marriage, and Colonial Discourse on the Zambian Copperbelt, 1924–1945". The International Journal of African Historical Studies. 27 (2): 241–271. doi:10.2307/221025. JSTOR 221025.
- Rennie, J. K. (1978). "The Contribution of Librarians to Historical Research in Zambia". Zambia Library Association Journal. 10: 1–12.
- Swanzy, Henry (July 1949). "Quarterly Notes". African Affairs. 48 (192): 177–204. doi:10.1093/oxfordjournals.afraf.a093732. JSTOR 718617.
