= Frederick Kambemba Yamusangie =

Congolese writer

Frederick Kambemba Yamusangie is a novelist, playwright and poet who was born and partly brought up in Zaire (now known as the Democratic Republic of Congo) in Africa.

He studied communication engineering at the University of Kent at Canterbury in England and now lives in London.

He is the author of Full Circle, a literary novel set in Congo.

== Selected published works ==
- Full Circle ISBN 0-595-28294-6
- Beneath the Blue Sky: A Short Book of Poetry ISBN 1-4137-8638-3
- The Sun, The River & The Horizon ISBN 978-1615469901
- Poetry of Light & Quietness: Poems & Short Stories ISBN 978-1462630851
- Lyrics of a Smiling Poet ISBN 978-1630841133
