= Dieudonné Niangouna =

Congolese playwright, actor and theatre director

- Born: 13 February 1976 (age 50); Ouenzé, Brazzaville, Republic of the Congo
- Occupations: Playwright, actor, director, novelist, poet
- Writing career
- Language: French
- Notable awards: 2021 Prix du jeune théâtre Béatrix-Dussane–André-Roussin (Académie Française young playwright award)

Dieudonné Niangouna (Brazzaville, Republic of the Congo, 1976) is a Congolese playwright, novelist, poet, actor and theatre director.

== Career ==
Born in the poor quarters Crâneurs et Mouléké of Ouenzé, Brazzaville, in 1976, Niangouna first studied art at the École nationale des Beaux-Arts (National School of Fine Arts) in Brazzaville before turning to theatre and becoming a well-known comedian, director and playwright. His plays Attitude Clando and Inepties volantes were performed at the Festival d'Avignon in 2007 and 2009, respectively. In 2013 he was associated artist (Artiste associé) of the 67th edition of the Festival d’Avignon.

Niangouna was in 2003 one of the founders of the International annual december theater festival Mantsina sur scène in Brazzaville.

In 2021 the Académie Française awarded him the Prix du jeune théâtre Béatrix-Dussane–André-Roussin (French theatre award for a young playwright) for his body of work.

== Plays by Niangouna ==
Year	Title	Theater	Role
2007	2147, l'Afrique		Playwright
2009	On ne priera pas l'oxygène, le grand écart		Playwright
2009	Les Inepties volantes	Festival d'Avignon	Playwright, director, actor
2011	Ciel dans la ville, Afrique – France		Playwright
2012	Ilda et Nicole		Actor
2013	Shéda	Festival d'Avignon	Playwright, director, actor
2015	Le Kung-Fu	Théâtre Vidy-Lausanne	Playwright, director, actor
2019	Trust / Shakespeare / Alléluia		Playwright, director, actor
2021–2022	De ce côté	Théâtre du Nord, Lille	Playwright, director, actor
2022	Portrait Désir	MC93 (fr), Seine-Saint-Denis, Bobigny	Playwright, director, actor

== Publications ==
- Carré blanc, suivi de, Pisser n'est pas jouer (in French). Yaoundé, Cameroun: Interlignes. 2006. ISBN 9956-435-04-X. OCLC 62697265. 48 pages.
- Traces: récits & pièces (in French). Le Puy-en-Velay France: Carnets livres. 2007. ISBN 2-916154-19-1. OCLC 470645993. 438 pages. Stories and plays.
- Les Inepties volantes, suivi de Attitude clando (in French). Besançon, France: Les Solitaires Intempestifs. 2010. ISBN 978-2-84681-287-0. OCLC 668371864. 92 pages. Play.
- Le Socle des vertiges (in French). Besançon, France: Les Solitaires intempestifs. 2011. ISBN 978-2-84681-333-4. OCLC 760989465. 77 pages.
- Acteur de l’écriture. Du désavantage du vent (in French). Besançon, France: Les Solitaires intempestifs. 2011. ISBN 978-2-84681-385-3. OCLC 857378590. 59 pages.
- Sony chez les chiens : suivi de Blues pour Sony : théâtre. Acoria éditions. 2016. ISBN 9782355721557. OCLC 971578347. 80 pages. Plays.
- Trust / Shakespeare / Alléluia (in French). Les Solitaires intempestifs. 2019. OCLC 1142724546. 120 pages. Play.
- Rêve en carton (in French). Project'îles. 2021. ISBN 978-2-493036-01-8. OCLC 1289939402. 180 pages. Poetry.
- Papa tombe dans la lune (roman). Fictions & fantaisies (in French). L'Œil d'or. January 2022. ISBN 978-2-490437-13-9. OCLC 1294273445. 230 pages. Novel.
- La Mise en Papa (roman) (in French). L'Œil d'or. January 2023. ISBN 978-2-490437-20-7. OCLC 1371290451. 275 pages. Novel.
- Salve d'honneur pour orchestre à papa : roman. Fictions & fantaisies. Paris: L'Œil d'or. 2024. ISBN 9782490437351. OCLC 1433687059. 572 pages. Novel.

== Secondary literature ==
- Thérésine, Amélie (2013). Le Théâtre de Dieudonné Niangouna. Corps en scène et en parole (in French). [Paris]: Acoria éditions. ISBN 9782355721168. OCLC 859151000. 151 pages.
