= Michelle Lora =

Ivorian writer (born 1968)

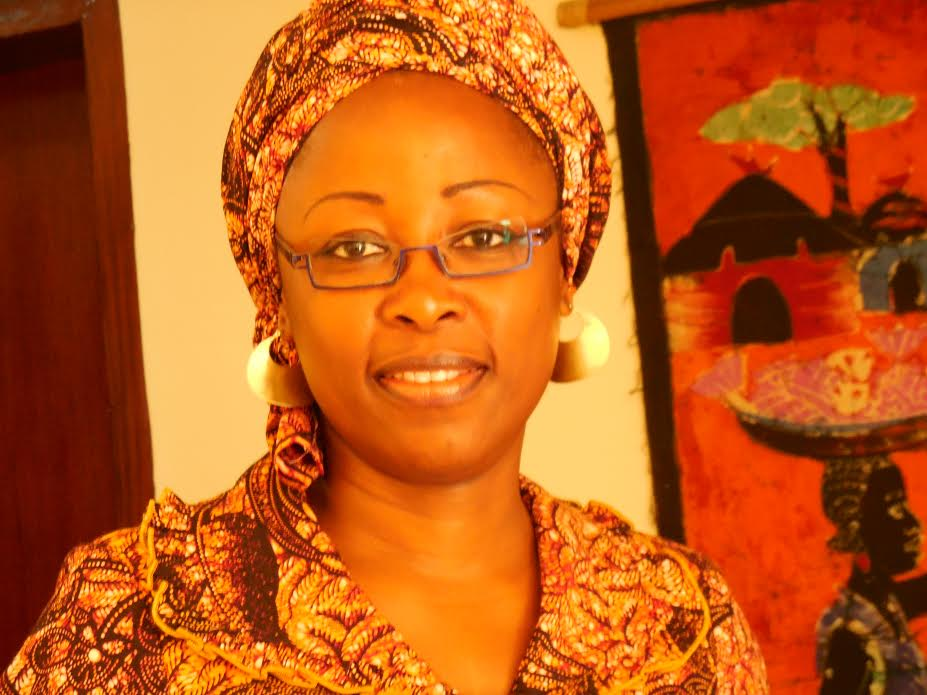
Michelle Lora (2014)

Michelle Tanon-Lora (born 1968) is an Ivorian writer and academic, teaching literary criticism and Spanish literature at the Université Félix Houphouët-Boigny in Abidjan. Passionately interested in story telling, she has created a group of oral story tellers called "Pathé Pathé" (meaning patchwork). In 2009, she began writing children's stories herself, believing that reading encourages young people to show interest in Africa's cultural heritage. Since 2011, she has been vice-president of the Ivorian Writers' Association.

== Biography ==
Born on 20 August 1968 in Bouaké, Michelle Tanon-Lora heads a one-parent family. As of April 2020, she has three children, a 19-year-old daughter and two sons, one 15, the other 11.

After a master's degree in Spanish at the Université Félix Houphouët-Boigny in 1992, she earned a doctorate in literature at the University of Burgundy in 1999 with a thesis titled La dynamique textuelle chez Alberto Insúa : transcription, analyse poétique et critique génétique de Ha llegado el día. In 2007, she was appointed Vice-Dean of Research at the Université Félix Houphouët-Boigny, specializing in literary criticism. Her teaching also covers Spanish literature and social communication. At the university's UFR ICA (Information, Communication and Arts) department, she covers oral story telling and popular African games. Lora tries to encourage children and young people to show interest in reading and story telling by arranging workshops and training programmes. In 2009, she established Pathé-Pathé, an initiative specially devoted to promoting story telling in schools throughout the world.

In 2009, she began writing children's stories herself, believing that reading encourages young people to show interest in Africa's cultural heritage. Since 2011, she has been vice-president of the Ivorian Writers' Association. Thanks to her Lec'TOUR project, Lora has introduced mobile library visits to kindergartens and primary school in urban and rural disadvantages areas.

== Awards ==
Since she began publishing her own stories for children, Lora has won a number of awards, including:

- 2015: second prize from the National Library of Ivory Coast for youth literature
- 2017: second Excellence Award for Literature from the Ivorian government
- 2017: Jeanne de Cavally Award for youth literature
