= Gad Ami =

Togolese writer

- Gad Ami (seated) and Kangni Alem
- Born: January 1, 1958 (age 68); Lomé
- Occupations: Novelist; Writer

Gad Ami is the pseudonym of Amivi Gadegbeku (born 1958), a French-language novelist from Togo. She was the first woman novelist in Togo.

== Life ==
In 2001 she moved to live in the United States.

== Works ==
- Etrange héritage: roman [Strange heritage: a novel]. Lomé: Nouvelles Editions africaines, 1985. ISBN 978-2723609319
- La croix de la mariée: roman [The bride's cross: a novel]. Cotonou, République du Bénin: Les Éditions du Flamboyant: Émeraude Éditions, 2014. ISBN 978-9991959504
