= Richard Dogbeh =

Beninese novelist and educator

- Born: December 31, 1932
- Died: November 23, 2003 (aged 70)
- Occupations: Poet; Writer

Richard Dogbeh (1932–November 23, 2003), born Gbèmagon Richard Dogbeh in what is now Benin, was a novelist and educator.

== Biography ==
He served as Benin's Directeur de Cabinet of the National Ministry of Education from 1963 to 1966. He was also active in the Comité Consultatif International de Documentation des Bibliothèques et des Archives and then from 1968 to 1979 served as a UNESCO expert on educational systems for much of West Africa. After that he spent his life in Benin.

As an author Dogbeh started early and at 16 won the nation's "Institut Français d'Afrique Noire" prize for a novel. He also published essays, poems, and stories.

He died in Cotonou.
