= Monde Sifuniso =

Zambian writer

Monde Sifuniso (born 1944) is a Zambian writer.

She was born in Barotseland and studied teaching at the University College of Rhodesia and Nyasaland, broadcasting at the Australian Broadcasting Corporation teaching school and advanced publishing at Oxford Brookes University.

Sifuniso was co-editor and contributor to The Heart of a Woman (1997), a collection of short stories, and Woman Power in Politics (1998), a book about women politicians in Zambia. She published Talk about Health in 1998 based on her research in western Zambia. Sifuniso was publisher at the University of Zambia until 1997 and was president of the Zambian Women Writers' Association.

She edited Eavesdropping published by Zambia Women Writers Association.
