= Glória de Sant'Anna =

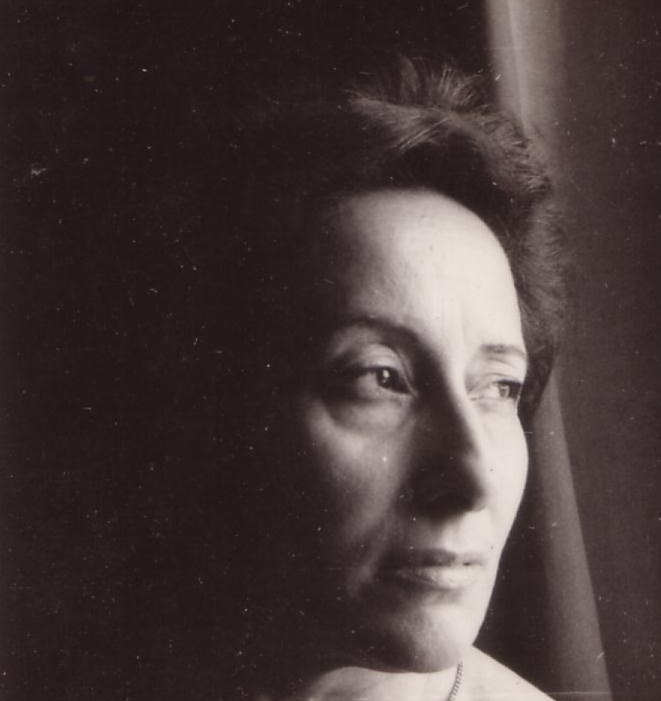
portrait of Glória de Sant'Anna

Glória de Sant'Anna (26 May 1925 – 2 June 2009) was a Portuguese-born poet and educator who lived in Portuguese Mozambique from 1951 to 1974.

She was born in Lisbon and taught school in Porto Amélia (later Pemba) and Vila Pery (later Chimoio). De Sant'Anna married architect Afonso Henriques Manta Andrade Paes in 1949. She published six collections of poetry while living in Mozambique and is credited with establishing a tradition of lyricism in Mozambique poetry. In 1961, she received the Prémio Camilo Pessanha for Livro de Água.

De Sant'Anna died in Válega at the age of 84.
