= Reading the Ceiling =

2007 novel by Gambian writer Dayo Forster

- Book cover
- Author: Dayo Forster
- Language: English
- Publisher: Simon & Schuster (UK)
- Publication date: May 2007
- Media type: Print
- ISBN: 9781416527640

Reading the Ceiling is a 2007 debut novel by Dayo Forster. Forster was born in the Gambia, studied at the London School of Economics, and she now lives in Kenya.

Forster's book tells the story of eighteen-year-old Ayodele and explores three paths her life could take. Ayodele is a Gambian schoolgirl entering adulthood. One path takes her to university in England, and another to polygamy and motherhood.

== Reception ==
Owen Richardson, reviewing the novel in The Age, compared it to Philip Roth's The Counterlife. A reviewer for The Point praised Forster's use of local terminology and accurate portrayal of Gambian society, especially regarding the roles of women.

In 2007, Reading the Ceiling was shortlisted for a Commonwealth Writers' Prize. In 2019, the novel was one of The New York Times' travel selections, "52 Books for 52 Places"/
