= Sénouvo Agbota Zinsou =

Togolese playwright and theatre director (born 1946)

Sénouvo Agbota Zinsou (born 1946) is a Togolese playwright and theatre director.

== Biography ==
Born in Togo, Zinsou studied in France, receiving degrees in theatre and communications. In 1968, after working with several student companies, he co-founded a university theatre company. He began receive attention outside Togo when his play On joue la comédie received first prize at the Radio France Internationale's 1972 "Festival of Black Arts and Culture" in Lagos, Nigeria.

He directed a production of the same play which later toured France. Since 1978, Zinsou has been director of the Troupe Nationale du Togo, a theatre, ballet and music company. He directs the company in productions of his own plays, including L'Arc en Ciel and Le Club. Zinsou premiered La Tortue qui Chante (The Singing Tortoise) in 1966 during the Francophone Summit in Lomé in a production that was later performed in France at the 1987 Limoges Festival. Zinsou is also a prize-winning short story writer, whose fiction and plays are published in France by Hatier. Other works include Yévi et L'éléphant Chanteur and Le Médicament.
