= Raïs Neza Boneza =

Congolese Writer, Poet and Human Rights Advocate

Raïs Neza Boneza, born in the Katanga province of the Democratic Republic of the Congo (formerly Zaïre), is a Congolese-Norwegian writer, researcher and human rights activist.

He is co-convenor for Africa of Transcend Global Network, a network for peace, development and the environment. His first novel, White Eldorado, Black Fever (2013), was his first work to be translated from his native French. It attempts to raise awareness of the conflict and its direct effects on communities in Africa's Great Lakes region.

== Early life and education ==
Boneza was born in the Democratic Republic of Congo.

He continued his studies with a focus on understanding the dynamics of peace and conflict, earning degrees in [specific fields, e.g. peace and conflict studies, sociology or law] from [university/institution].

== Career ==
=== Writing ===
Raïs Neza Boneza is a writer whose literary works address themes of peace, identity and resilience:

- Nomad: A Refugee Poet (2008) - a collection of poems and reflections exploring the nomadic human experience, displacement and the quest to belong.
- Peace By African's Peaceful Means: A Philosophy of Peace (2004) - an exploration of African peace-building traditions and their relevance to contemporary global conflicts.

His works have been translated into several languages.

== Notable achievements ==
Among the distinctions he has received are the following

- He was named a member of the Transcend Global Network for Peace, an international group of academics and practitioners dedicated to peace-building and conflict resolution.
- He has been recognized as a cultural ambassador, bridging gaps by telling stories and promoting intercultural dialogue.

== Bibliography ==
- Nomad, A Refugee Poet (2003) ISBN 0-9726996-1-9
- Black Emeralds (2004) ISBN 9788182530348
- Peace by African's Peaceful Means (2005) ISBN 978-1593440992
- Peace through African's Peaceful Means (2003) ISBN 9788230000809
- Sounds of exile (2006) ISBN 978-1411609907
- Formless (2024) ISBN 978-1779331519
- White Eldorado, Black Fever (2019) ASIN B081DCDLZH
- Amani (2012) ISBN 978-8182537705
- Methode TRANSCEND: INTRODUCTION SUR LA TRANSFORMATION PACIFIQUE DES CONFLITS
