= Pyabelo Chaold Kouly =

Togolese author (born 1943)

Pyabelo Chaold Kouly (Pyabèlo Bernadette Chaold Kouli) is a Togolese author.

Born in 1943 in Pagouda, Togo, she subsequently migrated to Germany in 1961 to study as a laboratory assistant. She is one of the few female Togolese writers to be published.

== Selected works ==
- Souvenirs de douze années passées en République Fédérale d'Allemagne (Memories of Twelve Years Spent in Germany) 1975, published 1978.
- Brief von einer Togolesin an ihre Bekannten und Freunde in Deutschland.
- Le Caneton égaré. Lomé: Les Nouvelles Editions Africaines. ISBN 2-7236-0938-3 OCLC 36933011
- Enfants à la ferme de Lama-Tessi
- Fala, le redoutable. Lomé: Les Nouvelles Editions Africaines. ISBN 2-7236-0945-6 OCLC 36933041
- Le Missionnaire de Pessaré Kouloum. Lomé: Les Nouvelles Editions Africaines, 1979. OCLC 81289042
- Recitations. Lomé : Nouvelles Editions africaines du Togo, 1991. OCLC 36755134
- Djidili et Wédé à la ferme de Lama-Tessi au Togo, 1994? OCLC 35665101

== Sources ==
- Pyabelo Chaold Kouly, Reading Women Writers and African Literatures, University of Western Australia.
- Ayodélé Mané Aguiar. Chaold Pyabelo, écrivain à fleur de peau Amina 208 (septembre 1987), pp. 65–66. Interview
- Littérature féminine francophone d'Afrique noire By Pierrette Herzberger-Fofana, ISBN 2-7384-9905-8. pp 528–530.
- Révélations sur Mme CHAOLD, Togo-Contact magazine (undated)
- OCLC Linked Authority File
