= Félix Couchoro =

Togolese writer and educator

- Born: 30 January 1900
- Died: 5 April 1968 (aged 68)

Félix Couchoro (30 January 1900 – 5 April 1968) was a Togolese writer and educator.

== Biography ==
Couchoro was born on 30 January 1900 in Ouidah, Dahomey, to Dahomeyan parents. He attended primary school and secondary school respectively at the Catholic mission in Grand-Popo and the Minor Seminary of St. Joan of Arc in Ouidah from 1915 to 1919. He taught at the Catholic school in Grand Popo from 1919 to 1924. Between 1924 and 1939 Couchoro managed a branch of the Société Commerciale de l’Ouest Africain (SCOA). In 1929, Couchoro's first book, L'Esclave, was published in Paris, the second novel published by an African in French, but the book remained obscure for years. He edited the newspaper Éveil Togolais from 1931 to 1933, which was renamed Éveil Togo-Dahoméen. In the paper, he advocated for greater freedom of trade between Benin and Togo. Couchoro invented Onitsha-style chapbooks during this time.

In 1939, police harassment forced him to take refuge in Aneho in Togo. From 1939 to 1952, he worked as a business agent in Anecho and became a nationalist in the Committee of the Togolese Unit (CUT), Sylvanus Olympio's party. He began publishing books in serial form in the newspaper Togo-Presse, beginning with Amour de féticheuse in 1941. He worked on the editorial team of several newspapers that advocated for decolonization. However, he soon became the target of police repression again. After a riot in Vogan in 1952, he escaped to Aflao, Ghana, to avoid being jailed. His business failed and he was frequently low on money in Ghana.

He returned to Togo in 1958 and found a job in Lomé. When Togo became independent in 1960, Couchoro was appointed an editor at Information Service. He retired from this post in 1965, and died on 5 April 1968 in Lomé. Professor Martin Gbenouga, head of the Department of Modern Languages at the University of Lomé, said that Félix Couchoro "is an author sufficiently rich but not famous enough." In 2015, more than eighty years after it was written, his second book Amour de Féticheuse was published.

== Works ==
- L'Esclave, 1929
- Amour de féticheuse, 1941
- Drama d'amour à Anecho, 1950
- L'héritage cette peste, 1963
- Amour de Féticheuse, 2015
