= Fausto Duarte =

Cape Verde writer 1903–1953

Fausto Duarte (1903–1953) was a Cape Verdean writer. He lived in Guinea-Bissau.

== Writings ==
Duarte's first work was entitled Auá: Novela negra (Black Novella) and published in 1934. He went on to write four more books and a memoir.
