= Association Malienne des Droits de l'Homme =

Association Malienne des Droits de l'Homme (AMDH) is a Malian non-profit human rights non-governmental organization founded in Bamako, Mali on 11 December 1988.

== Leadership ==
Moustapha Cisse was President of the AMDH in 2006. As of January 2013, Moctat Mariko holds the role of President.

AMDH is a member of International Federation for Human Rights (FIDH).

== Human rights activities ==
In October 2005, AMDH organised a debate in Bamako about the death penalty.

In December 2012, during the Northern Mali conflict that started in January 2012, the AMDH together with the FIDH published a detailed report of human rights abuses that had occurred, referring to evidence of a rape campaign in Gao and Timbuktu after their takeover by the National Movement for the Liberation of Azawad (MNLA), recruitment of 12- to 15-year-old children as child soldiers by Ansar Dine, and the extrajudicial execution of 153 Malian soldiers by the MNLA and Ansar Dine on 24 January 2012.
