= Ada Boureïma =

Nigerien writer

- Born: 1945 (age 80–81); Gaya, Niger
- Occupation: Writer

Ada Boureïma (born 1945) is a Nigerien writer. After attending the Collège classique et moderne in Niamey, Boureïma pursued a teaching career. He completed his basic teaching certificate in 1965 and his advanced teaching certificate in 1969. He later worked as the director of several primary schools in Niamey. From 1979, he taught pedagogy at the Université Abdou-Moumouni.

Ada Boureïma belongs to a generation of Nigerien writers that includes names such as Amadou Diado, Yazi Dogo, Albert Issa, Abdoua Kanta, Amadou Ousmane, and André Salifou.

In his debut novel, Le baiser amer de la faim (The Bitter Kiss of Hunger), published in 1975, he explores the impact of the 1973 drought and famine in Niger, depicting how the natural disaster led to poverty and social disintegration in the country.

He revisited this theme in Waay Dulluu ou l'étau (The Vice Grip) from 1981, where a period of drought prompts the protagonist to leave the countryside for the city. His initial hopes are dashed, and after many years, he turns his back on the city, symbolizing the end of European colonization of Africa.

== Works ==
- —— (2005) [1975]. Le baiser amer de la faim [The Bitter Kiss of Hunger]. Niamey: Imprimerie Nationale du Niger.
- —— (2007) [1981, INDRAP]. Waay Dulluu ou l'étau [The Vice Grip]. Niamey: Editions Daouda.
- —— (2007) [1998, INDRAP]. La lettre du désert [The Desert Letter]. Niamey: Editions Daouda.
- —— (1998). Mahawara ou le débat. Suivi de poèmes [Mahawara or the Debate. Followed by Poems]. Niamey: INDRAP.
- —— (2007). Balade aux États-Unis [Stroll in the United States]. Niamey: Editions Daouda.
- —— (2007). Le choix de Mani [Mani's Choice]. Niamey: Editions Daouda.
- —— (2014). Et si nous parlons politique [What If We Talk Politics]. Niamey: Editions Gashingo.
