= Hawad =

Nigerien poet and writer

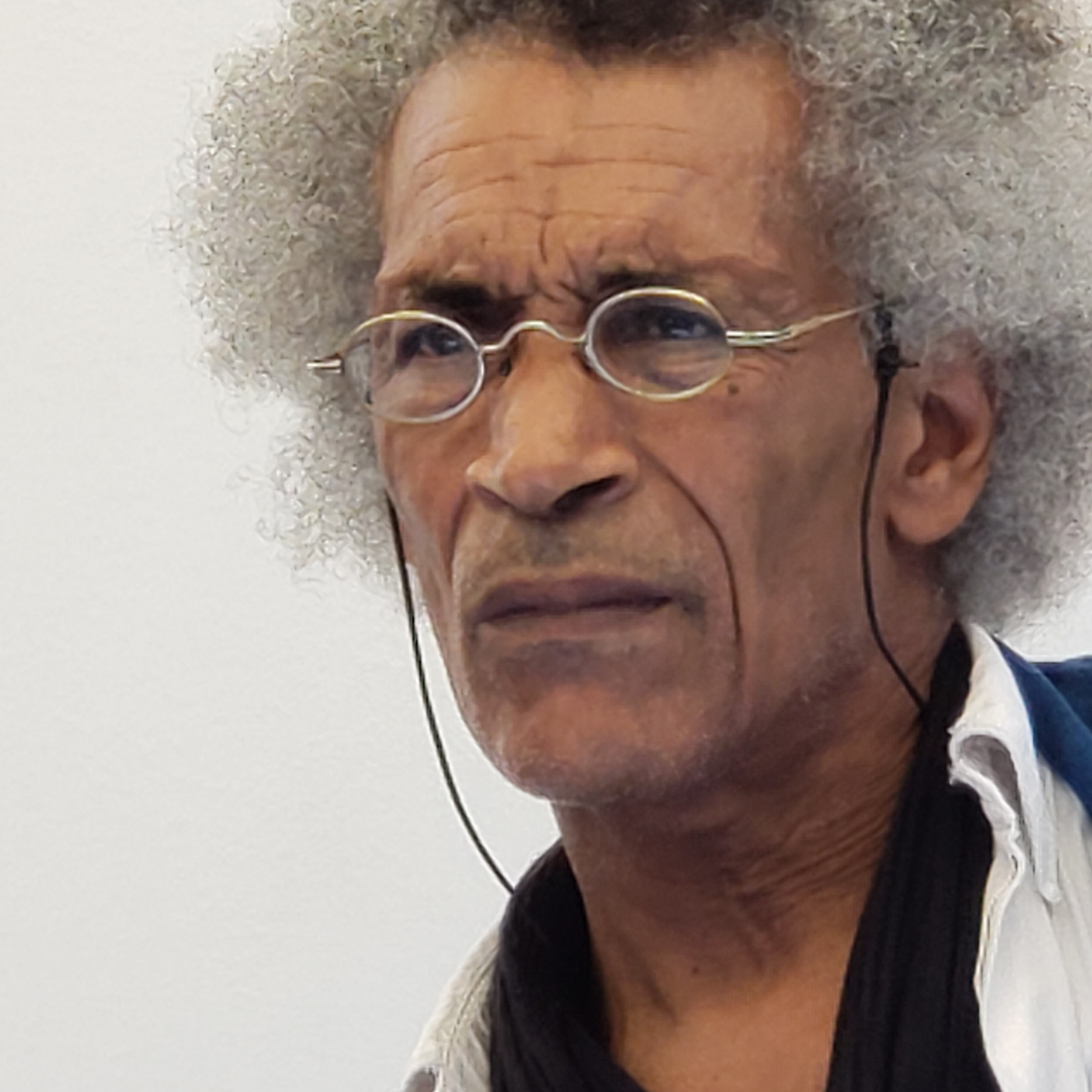
- Image of Mahmoudan Hawad
- Born: 1950 (age 75–76); Niger
- Other name: Mahmoudan Hawad
- Occupations: Poet and author
- Awards: Argana International Poetry Prize (2017

Hawad, sometimes Mahmoudan Hawad, (born 1950) is a Tuareg poet and author born in the Aïr region of Niger and who currently lives and publishes from Aix-en-Provence, France. Hawad deploys a method he calls furigraphy (a play on the word calligraphy) to create space in his poetry and to illuminate certain themes. Common themes of his work include thirst, movement, wandering, anarchy, and political themes related to Tuareg politics in the region. He is married to Hélène Claudot-Hawad, a Tuareg scholar and translator of Hawad's poetry into French. He has published a number of poems, epics, and other literary works primarily in French, but translations have increased in recent years with an Arabic translation of Testament nomade by prominent Syrian poet Adunis.

== Life and work ==
Hawad was born in 1950 in the Aïr region in what is today Niger. Although born in what is now Niger, Hawad refuses to identify with this state. He was born into a family of the Ikazkazan Tuareg, who are part of the larger Kel Ayr Tuareg group. He recounts many crossings over the Sahara and the Sahel on camelback while he was growing up with his brothers and father. In his early adult life, he was part of a growing number of Tuareg who moved away from Tuareg lands to work as a day laborer with stretches of unemployment which first introduced him to Tuareg politics. He married Hélène Claudot-Hawad and relocated, in "chosen exile", to France before the Tuareg revolutions in the early 1990s.

=== Literary works ===
Hawad has published a number of literary works from the mid-1980s to the present. Many of these are books of poetry, but others also combine literary forms similar to mythical epics, lyrical prose, and novels. At the same time, he writes polemical, political essays in many of the prominent newspapers in France and Niger.

To compose his poetry, he delivers the poems aloud in his native tongue of Tamazight and records the presentation before he and his wife translate the poems into French for publication. This process is aimed to capture the transition in literature from oral recitations of the nomadic lifestyle into the individualized ideas of modern authorship.

Themes common in his early work were issues related to life in the desert: primarily thirst, hunger, and constantly moving. While retaining these themes, his later work began to directly engage with the politics of Tuareg nationalism and oppression by the governments of Mali and Niger. Chaos and wandering are also themes which run throughout his work and he uses these themes to connect Tuareg nomad life with other struggles around the world.

Although he identifies with the Tuareg people, his poetry and politics embrace anarchy and are focused primarily on resistance to oppressive forces. Christopher Wise writes that "his poetry, like his politics, militates against political affiliations of any sort, with the possible exception of Western anarchist traditions as well as military movements like the Zapatistas in Mexico." The politics of his poems are interpreted as a response to attempts in the French media to make the Tuareg exotic or efforts to make the area a site for tourism.

=== Furigraphy ===
A unique component of the written poems is the inclusion of altered Tifinagh, the written form of Tamazight, and characters in a form of calligraphy. Although the characters are rooted in Tifinagh writing, Hawad changes them to remove any specific meaning and simply to create space within the poems. He calls this practice furigraphy (furigraphie in French). His experiments with furigraphy in his poetry led Hawad to produce a number of artworks built from the altered characters. Hawad's furigraphy locates him within a wider movement to maintain and protect Tifinagh characters in the Tuareg diaspora communities.

== List of works ==
The following is a list of works produced by Hawad (all were first published in French).

- Caravane de la soif et de l'égarement (1987)
- Chants de la soif et de l'égarement (1987)
- Testament nomade (1987)- translated into Arabic by Syrian poet Adunis
- L'Anneau-Sentier (1989)
- Froissevent (1991)
- Yasida (1991)
- La danse funèbre du soleil (1992)
- Buveurs de braises (1992)
- Sept fièvres et une lune (1995)
- Le coude griçant de l'anarchie (1998)
- Les haleurs d'horizon (1998)
- Notre horizon de gamelles pour une gamelle d’horizons (2001)
- Détournement d'horizon (2002)
- Sahara. Visions atomiques (2003)
- Le goût du sel gemme (2006)

== Awards ==
- The Argana International Poetry Prize (2017; from Morocco)
