= Sulayman S. Nyang =

Gambian academic and writer

- Born: August 12, 1944; The Gambia
- Died: November 12, 2018 (aged 74)
- Occupations: University teacher; Diplomat; Writer

Dr. Sulayman S. Nyang (12 August 1944 — 12 November 2018) was a professor and former chairman of the African Studies Department at Howard University in Washington, D.C. He was a co-principal investigator of the Project MAPS and also a former deputy ambassador and head of chancery of the Gambia Embassy in Jeddah, Saudi Arabia. Nyang served as consultant to several national and international agencies and on the boards of the African Studies Association, the American Council for the Study of Islamic Societies, America's Islamic Heritage Museum, and the Association of Muslim Social Scientists. He wrote extensively on Islamic, African and Middle Eastern affairs. He held a master's degree in public administration and a Ph.D. in government from the University of Virginia. Nyang was an advising scholar for the award-winning, PBS-broadcast documentaries Muhammad: Legacy of a Prophet (2002) and Prince Among Slaves (2007), produced by Unity Productions Foundation.

== Selected books ==
- Islam, Christianity and African Identity (1984)
- A Line in the Sand: Saudi Arabia’s Role in the Gulf War (1995), co-authored with Evan Hendricks
- Religious Plurality in Africa: Essays in Honor of John S. Mbiti (1993 and co-authored with Jacob Olupona)
