= Ahmad ibn al-Amin al-Shinqiti =

Mauritanian writer

Ahmad ibn al-Amin al-Shinqiti (ca. 1863–1913) is one of Mauritania's most famous writers. He is the author of the geographical, literary and historical compendium Al-Wasit fi tarájim udaba al-Shinqit, ed. Fuad Sayyid, Cairo 1958. The survey is the only major Arabic-language work about Mauritania published by a Mauritanian author.

== Bibliography ==
- Chouki El Hamel, "The Transmission of Islamic Knowledge in Moorish Society from the Rise of the Almoravids to the 19th Century", Journal of Religion in Africa, Vol. 29, Fasc. 1 (Feb., 1999), pp. 62–87
