= Honorine Ngou =

Gabonese writer and academic (born 1957)

Honorine Ngou (born 1957) is a Gabonese writer and academic.

== Life ==
Ngou was born in 1957, the oldest of eleven children. Her parents encouraged her schooling, though her mother had never attended school and her father had only completed two years of elementary school. When she was sixteen she married Albert Ngou, a university student in Libreville. She studied with her husband in Libreville, and when he attended university in France in 1974 she enrolled in a Grenoble lycée. Returning to Gabon with her husband in 1978, she did graduate study at Omar Bongo University before gaining a doctorate in France. By 1985 she was a professor at Omar Bongo University, and soon afterwards became chair of the Department of French there.

She lives in one of Libreville's poorest neighborhoods, Nzengayong, where she has opened a bookstore, Le Savoir.

== Works ==
- Quatorze clés pour réussir son couple. Libreville: Maison gabonaise du livre, 2003.
- Mariage et violence dans la société traditionnelle fang au Gabon. Paris: L'Harmattan, 2007.
- Féminin interdit. Paris: L'Harmattan, 2007.
- Afép: l'étrangleur-séducteur: roman. Paris: L'Harmattan, 2010.
- 50 contes éducatifs fang. Libreville, Gabon : Éditions Odette Maganga, 2013. With a preface by Bonaventure Mvé-Ondo.
- Mon mari, mon salaud: essai. Libreville: Les Éditions Le Savoir, 2017. With a preface by Claudette Oriol-Boyer.
- Ils ne pensent qu'à ça: roman. Rungis: la Doxa, 2017.
