= Martha Nasibù =

Ethiopian writer and artist

Martha Nasibù or Nassibou (Addis Ababa, 28 October 1931–23 March 2019) was an Ethiopian writer and artist, who lived in France.

The daughter of Nasibu Zeamanuel, she was born in Addis Ababa, moved to Italy in 1936 and studied at the Académie des Beaux-Arts in Paris and the Art Students League of New York. Her first exhibition of work was organized by the Ethiopian ministry of Education and Fine Arts in 1945. Nasibù was a founding member of the Ethiopian Artists Club. She lived in Perpignan until her death. Her art is included in the collection of the National Museum of Ethiopia.

In 2005, she published Memorie di una principessa etiope, which describes the 1930s invasion of Ethiopia by the Italian fascist government.
