= Ketty Nivyabandi =

Burundian poet and human rights activist

- Born: 1978 (age 47–48); Belgium
- Education: International Relations
- Occupations: Poet; human rights activist
- Writing career
- Language: French

Ketty Nivyabandi (born 1978) is a Burundian poet and human rights activist living in exile in Canada.

== Biography ==
She was born in Belgium and grew up in Bujumbura, Burundi, where she studied International Relations and worked as a journalist. Her French-language poetry has appeared in literary magazines such as World Literature Today and Words Without Borders, and in anthologies including We Have Crossed Many Rivers: New Poetry (2012) and Margaret Busby's New Daughters (2019). In 2012 Nivyabandi represented Burundi in the London Poetry Parnassus as part of the Summer Olympics.

Nivyabandi became an activist during Burundi's constitutional crisis of 2015. She led Burundi's first women-only protest and was a founding member of the Women and Girls Movement for Peace and Security in Burundi. She was forced to flee the country when she was targeted by the government. She has testified before the House of Commons of Canada's Subcommittee on International Human Rights on human rights violations in Burundi, and regularly speaks on human rights, especially women's rights and the effects of conflict on women's lives. In 2016 she was included in Kate Schatz's Rad Women Worldwide.

In 2017, Nivyabandi joined the staff of the Nobel Women's Initiative as a Media Associate. In March 2019 she was a speaker at the Geneva Summit for Human Rights and Democracy. She has been appointed as the Secretary General of Amnesty International Canada (English-Speaking Branch) in 2020, succeeding Alex Neve. Presently, Nivyabandi resides and works in Ottawa, Canada.
