= Sadeq Naihoum =

Libyan writer and journalist

Sadeq Al Naihoum
- Born: 1937; Benghazi, Libya
- Died: 15 November 1994 (aged 56–57); Geneva, Switzerland

Sadeq Al Naihoum (Arabic: الصادق النيهوم; 1937 – 15 November 1994) was a Libyan writer and journalist.

== Early life and education ==
He was born in Benghazi, Libya, in 1937, where he lived and studied until he finished his university degree in literature. He then lived in Egypt, Germany, and Finland, between 1963 and 1971.

== Career ==
Naihoum began writing in the newspaper Haqiqa Weekly in the 1960s, while he was studying and working in Helsinki. His socio-political articles raised much debate at the time, and until his death in Geneva in 1994. He was distinguished by his daring satire, and during the 1960s, his articles were widely read. The subjects he wrote about continue to raise a lot of debate in the Arab cultural circles of today.

== Death ==
After suffering from lung cancer for two years, Naihoum died on 15 November 1994 in Geneva. He is buried in Benghazi.
