= Kemuel Edward Ntsane =

Mosotho novelist and poet (1920–1983)

K. E. Ntsane
- Born: 4 April 1920; Kolonyama, Leribe, Basutoland
- Died: 7 July 1983 (aged 63)
- Occupations: Novelist, poet

Kemuel Edward Ntsane (4 April 1920 – 7 July 1983) was a prominent Mosotho poet, novelist, and teacher. He is regarded as one of the most significant figures in Sesotho literature during the mid twentieth century. More recently, he became known for his 1963 novel, Nna Sajene Kokobela, C.I.D., which was adapted into a Sesotho TV drama in the 2001 starring Sello Motloung.

== Life ==
Ntsane was born in Kolonyama, on the border of the Leribe and Berea districts in what was then Basutoland. His parents, Chaka Ntsane and Evelina Ntsane, were Bakoena. The son of a schoolteacher, Ntsane was educated in local primary schools before attending Morija Teacher Training College between 1935 and 1939. Following graduation, he began teaching at Roma and then Maseru High School. Ntsane married Julia 'Machaka, a fellow teacher, in 1945, and went on to have four children.

In 1947, Ntsane joined the UCL Institute of Education, specialising in the teaching of English as a foreign language. While in London he and his wife met Gladstone Llewelyn Letele, a linguist, and his wife, Thomas Mofolo's daughter. During the 1950s he became an insurance agent before moving to Swaziland to take up a teaching post, and then returning home to teach once again at Roma before joining the Lerotholi Technical College as an English and mathematics teacher.

By the 1960s, Ntsane had joined the civil service, and from 1970 until his death on 7 July 1983 he worked for the independent government of Lesotho as Hansard editor.

== Works ==
Ntsane's publications span two decades, from the mid-1940s to the mid-1960s. Among his earliest work was an anthology of poetry, 'Musapelo I, which was followed by a second volume in 1961. In these poems, Ntsane introduced satire into Sotho poetry alongside the extensive use of rhyme. The setting for his poems cover both his home and neighbouring South Africa, exploring topics such as apartheid, migrant labour, and Christianity. In satirising the myth of racial superiority, Ntsane explored themes that other writers from the region often avoided.

His first novel, Masoabi: Ngoan'a Mosotho'a kajeno, narrates the transformation of the Basotho through industrialisation. In 1963, he published Nna Sajene Kokobela CID, a detective story set in the years following the Second World War that centres on an investigation into ritual murders, a theme previously explored in novels by A.S. Mopeli-Paulus and Sebolai Matlosa. The novel explores the effect of conscription on the Basotho, who returned home to be rewarded with bicycles while their white counterparts were granted land.

Ntsane's other books include a novel for young readers, Bana ba rona, a biblical drama, Josefa le Maria, a collection of essays titled Makumane, and Mohwebi wa Venisi, a translation of The Merchant of Venice.

== Complete works ==
- Ntsane, K.E. (1946). Masoabi: Ngoan'a Mosotho 'a Kajeno (in Southern Sotho). Morija: Sesuto Book Depot.
- —— (1946). 'Musapelo I (in Southern Sotho). Morija: Sesuto Book Depot.
- —— (1954). Bana ba Rona (in Southern Sotho). Morija: Sesuto Book Depot.
- —— (1955). Josefa le Maria (in Southern Sotho). Mazenod: Catholic Press.
- —— (1961). 'Musapelo II (in Southern Sotho). Johannesburg: Afrikaanse Pers-Boekhandel.
- —— (1961). Makumane (in Southern Sotho). Johannesburg: Afrikaanse Pers-Boekhandel.
- —— (1961). Mohwebi wa Venisi (in Southern Sotho). Johannesburg: Afrikaanse Pers-Boekhandel.
- —— (1963). Nna Sajene Kokobela, C.I.D. (in Southern Sotho). Johannesburg: Afrikaanse Pers-Boekhandel.
- —— (1968). Bao Batho (in Southern Sotho). Johannesburg: Afrikaanse Pers-Boekhandel.

== Sources ==
- Gérard, Albert S (1971). Four African literatures: Xhosa, Sotho, Zulu, Amharic. Berkeley: University of California Press.
- Gikandi, Simon (2005). Encyclopedia of African Literature. London: Routledge.
- Herdeck, Donald E. (1973). African Authors: A Companion to Black African Writing, Volume I, 1300–1973. Washington, D.C.: Black Orpheus Press. ISBN 0-87953-008-1.
- Jahn, Janheinz; Schild, Ulla; Nordmann-Seiler, Almut (1972). Who's Who in African Literature: Biographies, Works, Commentaries. Tübingen: H. Erdmann. ISBN 978-3-7711-0153-4.
- Maake, Nhlanhla (1992). "A Survey of Trends in the Development of African Language Literatures in South Africa: With Specific Reference to Written Southern Sotho Literature c1900-1970s". African Languages and Cultures. 5 (2): 157–188. doi:10.1080/09544169208717753. JSTOR 1771779.
- Maphike, Pule Ranaileng Stephen (1991). History of southern sotho literature as system, 1930-1960 (PhD thesis). University of South Africa.
- Nichols, Lee (1984). African Writers at the Microphone. Washington, D.C.: Three Continents Press. ISBN 0-89410-164-1.
- Selepe, Thapelo Joshua (1999). Towards the African theory of literary production: Perspectives on the Sesotho novel (PhD thesis). University of South Africa.
