= Zindaba Nyirenda =

Zindaba Nyirenda (“Zindie” ) is a Nkhosikazi princess of sixth generation Shaka Zulu ancestry, and an author from Zambia.

== Life ==
Nyirenda grew up in Chililabombwe. The family relocated to Lundazi and she graduated from the University of Zambia, where she met her future husband. Nyirenda arrived in the US in 1985, settling in Chicago, Illinois. She studied at Roosevelt University. Nyirenda is the author of Ta-Lakata: The Tears of Africa, an autobiography. Her father, the grandson of His Royal Highness Chief Mphamba of the Tumbuka, owned a soccer team and died of HIV/AIDs in 1993 from giving blood donations. Her mother died in 2002. She has three children. She is president and founder of “Light on the Hill for Africa”, a humanitarian and educational organization serving Zambian children.
