= Esther Nirina =

Malagasy poet and librarian (1932–2004)

- Born: 1932; Madagascar
- Died: 2004 (aged 71–72)
- Occupation: Poet
- Writing career
- Language: French
- Genre: Poetry
- Notable works: Simple voyelle, Rien que lune: Oeuvres poétiques

Esther Nirina (née Ranirinaharitafika, 1932–2004) was a Malagasy poet. Born in 1932 in Madagascar, she lived in Orléans, France from 1953 to 1983, working as a librarian, before returning to Madagascar and establishing herself as a poet. During her career, Nirina was a member of the Académie Malagache, and head of the Society of the Writers of the Indian Ocean (SEROI). Her volume of poetry Simple voyelle was awarded the ADELF Grand Prix Littérature de Madagascar.

== Life ==
Nirina was an only child, and she has said in interviews that her name means "desired one" because her parents wanted a child so badly. She was raised in Antananarivo, the capital of Madagascar, where her father worked as a civil servant, but her family often visited the village in the country where her father was raised.

Nirina moved to France in 1953, following her husband, who completed his studies in teaching there. While in Orléans, she began working as a librarian. She worked alongside Hélène Cadou, the wife of Réné-Guy Cadou. Hélène Cadou took an interest in Nirina after reading a poem she'd written, and pushed her to continue writing. In 1975, Nirina's first volume of poetry, Silencieuse respiration, was released by the Orléans publisher Sergent. Simple voyelle followed in 1980, from the same publisher.

Madagascar attained independence in 1960, and Nirina's family chose to stay in France. She and her husband remained in Orléans until her children went to university. Nirina and her husband traveled some, before returning to Madagascar in 1990 to renovate their houses in Antananarivo and the country so that they would have some place to retire, she said. She died in 2004.

== Style ==
Nirina's style combines her heritage and youth in Madagascar with her experiences living in France. She uses traditional Malagasy poetry forms such as hainteny, but also draws on international influences such as Pablo Neruda and George Bataille. Her poetry is marked by nostalgia as well as philosophical references and multiplicity of meanings in her word choice.

== Notable works ==
- Silencieuse respiration (1975)
- Simple voyelle (1980)
- Lente spirale (1990)
- Multiple solitude (1997)
- Rien que lune: Oeuvres poétiques (1998)
- Mivolana an-tsoratra / Le dire par écrit (2004)
