= Dorothy Blair =

English scholar and translator (1913–1998)

- Born: Dorothy Sara Greene; August 10, 1913; Birmingham, England
- Died: November 12, 1998 (aged 85)
- Spouse: Maurice Blair (m. 1939)

Academic background
- Education: Royal Holloway College

Dorothy Sara Blair, nee Greene (1913–1998) was an English scholar and translator of Francophone African literature.

== Life ==
Dorothy Greene was born in Birmingham, England. She studied French at Royal Holloway, University of London, then taught for a period at North London Collegiate School in London. In 1939, she married Maurice Blair, and in 1941 the family moved, first to the British colony of Rhodesia (now Zimbabwe) and then to South Africa. She was a university lecturer at the University of Cape Town before moving to Johannesburg, where she joined the Department of Romance Languages at the University of the Witwatersrand as a French lecturer and eventually professor. She served as a trustee for The Classic, a literary magazine created by Nat Nakasa in Johannesburg, alongside Nadine Gordimer, Julian Beinart, Nimrod Mkele, and others. On retirement, Blair returned to England, living in Brighton and carrying out freelance literary translation from French.

Her papers are held at the University of Westminster.

== Works ==
- Jules Supervielle, a modern fabulist. 1957.
- African literature in French: a history of creative writing in French from the west and equatorial Africa. 1976
- (tr.) Snares Without End by Olympe Bhêly-Quénum. 1981.
- (tr.) The Beggars' Strike, or, The dregs of society by Aminata Sow Fall. 1981.
- Senegalese literature: a critical history. 1984.
- (tr.) Fantasia, an Algerian cavalcade by Assia Djebar. 1985.
- (tr.) Scarlet Song by Mariama Bâ. 1986.
- (tr.) My Life Story: the autobiography of a Berber woman by Fadhma A. M Amrouche. 1988.
- (tr.) The First Century after Beatrice by Amin Maalouf. 1992.
- (tr.) Africa Dances by Michael Huet and Claude Savary. 1995.
- (tr.) The Gardens of Light: a novel by Amin Maalouf. 1996.
- (tr.) The Battle of Kadesh by Christian Jacq. 1998.
- (tr.) Sherazade by Leïla Sebbar. 1999.
