= Reproduction and pregnancy in speculative fiction =

Speculative and science fiction writers have often addressed the social, political, technological, and biological consequences of pregnancy and reproduction through the exploration of possible futures or alternative realities.

== Themes ==
As real-world reproductive technology has advanced, SF works have become increasingly interested in representing alternative modes of reproduction. Among the uses of pregnancy and reproduction themes regularly encountered in science fiction are:

- other modes of sexual reproduction;
- parthenogenetic reproduction;
- the use of technology in reproduction;

The phenomenon of pregnancy itself has been the subject of numerous works, both directly and metaphorically. These works may relate pregnancy to parasitism or slavery, or simply use pregnancy as a strong contrast with horror. For example, in the film, Rosemary's Baby (1968) (based on the 1967 novel by Ira Levin) a woman is tricked into a satanic pregnancy by her husband.

=== Alien–human hybrids ===
Inter-species reproduction and alien-human hybrids frequently occur in science fiction, and women being impregnated by aliens is a common theme in SF horror films, including I Married a Monster from Outer Space, Village of the Damned, Inseminoid, and Xtro. The theme has even been parodied, such as in the soft porn Wham Bam Thank You Spaceman.

In the film Alien Resurrection (1997), Ellen Ripley has been cloned to facilitate study of the alien queen embryo with which she was implanted In Octavia E. Butler's Lilith's Brood trilogy (1987, 1988, 1989) alien and human females impregnated with the DNA of males by alien intermediary-sex individuals, in "fivesomes".

== Assisted reproduction ==
Speculative fiction in technology of reproduction may involve cloning and ectogenesis, i.e., artificial reproduction).

The latter part of the 2000s decade has seen an upswing of films and other fiction depicting emotional struggles of assisted reproductive technology in contemporary reality rather than being speculation.

== Large-scale infertility or population growth ==
Fertility and reproduction have been frequent sites for examination of concerns about the impact of the environment and reproduction on the future of humanity or civilization. For example, The Children of Men by P. D. James is one of many works which have considered the implications of global infertility; Make Room! Make Room! by Harry Harrison is one of many works which have examined the converse, the implications of massive human population surges. Numerous other works, such as Implosion, The First Century after Beatrice, Venus Plus X and More Than Human by Theodore Sturgeon examine the future of humanity as it evolves, or particular breeding programs.

== Politics and gender politics ==
Pregnancy and control of human reproduction have often been used as proxies for treating gender issues or broader themes of social control; works dealing with pregnancy and human reproduction have been used to examine gender politics. For instance, "male pregnancy" has been used to comedic effect in mainstream literature and films such as Junior (1994 film, dir. Ivan Reitman), and has developed a following in fan fiction—the mpreg genre.

The genre of feminist science fiction has explored single-sex reproduction in depth, particularly parthenogenesis, as well as gendered control over the ability and right to reproduce. Many dystopian stories have been written about state-controlled reproduction, abortion, and birth control, such as Atwood's The Handmaid's Tale, or her short story, Freeforall. These works have often been analyzed as explorations of contemporary political debates about reproduction and pregnancy.

== See also ==
- Cyborg feminism
- Gender in speculative fiction
- LGBTQ themes in speculative fiction
- Interspecies reproduction
- Parthenogenic reproduction
- Sex and sexuality in speculative fiction
