= Omega man (disambiguation) =

The Omega Man is a 1971 science fiction film.

The Omega Man, Omega Man or Omegaman may refer to:

- Omegaman, a character in the Kinnikuman series
- "Omegaman" (song), a song by British/American band The Police
- An unidentified coin counterfeiter who signed creations with a miniature Greek letter omega
- The "Omegas" in the 1992 novel The Children of Men by P. D. James
