= Free for All =

Free for All may refer to:

- Free for All (film), a 1949 American comedy film
- "Free for All" (The Prisoner), a 1967 episode of the British television series The Prisoner
- Free-for-All (Ted Nugent album), 1976, or the title track
- Free-for-All (Michael Penn album) 1989
- Free for All (TV series), an American animated series created by Brett Merhar
- Free For All link page, a search engine optimization technique
- Deathmatch (video games), a video game mode, sometimes referred to as "free for all"
- Free for All (album), a 1964 Blue Note album by Art Blakey & the Jazz Messengers
- "Freeforall", a 1986 short story by Margaret Atwood
