= The Rock of Tanios =

1993 novel by Amin Maalouf

- Author: Amin Maalouf
- Original title: Le Rocher de Tanios
- Translator: Dorothy S. Blair
- Language: French
- Publisher: Éditions Grasset
- Publication date: 1993
- Publication place: France; Lebanon
- English publication date: 1994
- Pages: 277
- ISBN: 2-246-43541-2

The Rock of Tanios (French: Le Rocher de Tanios) is a 1993 novel by the French-Lebanese writer Amin Maalouf. It received the Prix Goncourt.

Set during 1800s Lebanon in the middle of the struggle between the Ottoman, British, and French control, the story follows Tanios, the son of a powerful sheik who brings chaos to his home village. Compelled to flee their village, Tanios and his father become involved in the conflicts between spies and politicians over control of Lebanon.

== See also ==
- 1993 in literature
- Contemporary French literature
