= Adrift =

Adrift may refer to:

== Media ==
- Adrift (band), a Tampa, Florida-based American heavy rock band
- Adrift (video game), a first-person adventure video game
- "Adrift", a song by God Is an Astronaut from the album Ghost Tapes #10
- "Adrift," a song by Barenaked Ladies from the album Barenaked Ladies Are Me (2006)

=== Film ===
- Adrift (1911 film), a 1911 American silent short drama film
- Adrift (2009 Brazilian film), a 2009 Brazilian drama film directed by Heitor Dhalia
- Adrift (2009 Vietnamese film), a 2009 Vietnamese film directed by Bui Thac Chuyen
- Adrift (2018 film), an American romantic drama film
- Open Water 2: Adrift, a 2006 psychological horror film

=== Literature ===
- Adrift, a 1980 memoir by Tristan Jones
- Adrift: Seventy-six Days Lost at Sea, a 1986 memoir by Steven Callahan
- Adrift: How Our World Lost Its Way, a 2019 book by Amin Maalouf
- Adrift: America in 100 Charts, a 2020 book by Scott Galloway
- "Adrift", a short story in the 1996 collection Dark Water by Koji Suzuki

=== Television ===
- Adrift, a 1993 television film starring Kate Jackson
- "Adrift" (Lost), the second episode of the second season of Lost
- "Adrift" (Stargate Atlantis), the 61st episode of the science fiction television series Stargate Atlantis
- "Adrift" (Torchwood), the eleventh episode of the second series of British science fiction television series Torchwood
- "Adrift", a 2020 episode of the animated series 12 oz. Mouse
- "Adrift" (The Lord of the Rings: The Rings of Power), an episode of the first season of The Lord of the Rings: The Rings of Power

== Other ==
- ADRIFT, a graphical user interface used to create and play text adventures
- Adrift, a ship direction meaning floating in the water without propulsion
