= Contemporary French literature =

French literary style

This article is about French literature from the year 2000 to the present day.

== Overview ==
The economic, political and social crises of contemporary France -terrorism, violence, immigration, unemployment, racism, etc.—and (for some) the notion that France has lost its sense of identity and international prestige—through the rise of American hegemony, the growth of Europe and of global capitalism (French: mondialisation)—have created what some critics (like Nancy Huston) have seen as a new form of detached nihilism, reminiscent of the 1950s and 1960s (Beckett, Cioran). The best known of these authors is Michel Houellebecq, whose Atomised (French: Les particules élémentaires) was a major international phenomenon. These tendencies have also come under attack. In one of her essays, Nancy Huston criticises Houellebecq for his nihilism; she also makes an acerbic censure of his novels in her work The teachers of despair (French: Professeurs de désespoir).

Although the contemporary social and political context can be felt in recent works, overall, French literature written in past decades has been disengaged from explicit political discussion (unlike the authors of the 1930s–1940s or the generation of 1968) and has focused on the intimate and the anecdotal. It has tended to no longer see itself as a means of criticism or world transformation, with some notable exceptions (such as Michel Houellebecq or Maurice Dantec).

Other contemporary writers during the last decade have consciously used the process of "autofiction" (similar to the notion of "faction") to renew the novel (Christine Angot for example). "Autofiction" is a term invented by Serge Doubrovsky in 1977. It is a new sort of romanticised autobiography that resembles the writing of the romantics of the nineteenth century. A few other authors may be perceived as vaguely belonging to this group: Emmanuel Carrère, Alice Ferney, Annie Ernaux, Olivia Rosenthal, Anne Wiazemsky, and Vassilis Alexakis. In a related vein, Catherine Millet's 2002 memoir The Sexual Life of Catherine M. gained much press for its frank exploration of the author's sexual experiences.

Contemporary French authors include: Jonathan Littell, David Foenkinos, Jean-Michel Espitallier, Christophe Tarkos, Olivier Cadiot, Chloé Delaume, Patrick Bouvet, Charles Pennequin, Nathalie Quintane, Frédéric-Yves Jeannet, Nina Bouraoui, Hubries le Dieu, Arno Bertina, Edouard Levé, Bruno Guiblet, Christophe Fiat, and Tristan Garcia.

Many of the most lauded works in French over the last decades have been written by individuals from former French colonies or overseas possessions. This Francophone literature includes the novels of Ahmadou Kourouma (Côte d'Ivoire), Tahar ben Jelloun (Morocco), Patrick Chamoiseau (Martinique), Amin Maalouf (Lebanon), Mehdi Belhaj Kacem (Tunisia), Assia Djebar (Algeria) and Mohamed Mbougar Sarr (Senegal).

France has a number of important literary awards Grand Prix du roman de l'Académie française, Prix Décembre, Prix Femina, Prix Interallié, Prix Flore, Prix Goncourt, Prix Médicis, and Prix Renaudot. In 2011 a new, controversial, award was created called Prix des prix littéraires ("Prize of Literary Prizes") which picks its winner from among the winners of these prizes.

== Extrême contemporain ==
The term extrême contemporain is a French expression used to indicate French literary production published in France in the last 10 years. The extrême contemporain is, then, an ever-shifting concept.

This term was first used by French writer Michel Chaillou in 1987. This simple and convenient definition hides a complex and chaotic literary situation, both from the chronological point of view (the temporal boundaries of the extrême contemporain are in continuous shifting) and for the heterogeneity of present French literary production, which cannot be defined in a clear and homogeneous way. The term, therefore, is all-inclusive. The literary production of this period is characterized by a transitory quality; because of the manifolded nature of such an immense corpus of texts, the identification of specific tendencies is inevitably partial and precarious.

Therefore, to define the extrême contemporain as a literary movement would be very improper: it is a mere term of convenience used by commentators and not by the authors themselves.

The extrême contemporain can be seen as a "literary constellation" hardly organized in schemes. In some cases, authors of the extrême contemporain follow an "aesthetics of fragments": their narration is broken into pieces or they show, like Pascal Quignard, for instance, a preference for short sentences. The "apportionment" of knowledge can also be carried out by the use of a chaotic verbal stream, the interior monologue, tropisms, repetition and endophasy. The feeling of uncertainty experience by writers leads him to put in question the notion of novel and its very form, preferring the more general notion of récit. Then, a return to reality takes place: in Pierre Bergounioux's works, readers witness the cultural upsetting concerning generations which follow one another; François Bon describes the exclusion from social and industrial reality; many authors of crime stories, like Jean-Patrick Manchette and Didier Daeninckx, describe social and political reality, and so it does Maurice G. Dantec in his works halfway between spy stories and science fiction; on another side, Annie Ernaux's écriture plate (lit. 'flat writing') tries to demolish the distance between reality and its narration.

Subjects are shown in a persistent state of crisis. However, a return to everyday life and trivial habits also takes place: the attention is focused to the "outcasts of literature", like, for instance, old people. This use of triviality and everyday life expresses itself in a new sort of "minimalism": from Pierre Michon's Small lives fictional biographies of unknown people, to Philippe Delerm's "small pleasures". The facets of this minimalism manifest themselves in many ways, through the triviality of the subject, through short forms, or through concise and bare phrases. On one hand, heroicized characters try to build up their own individual way against a senseless reality, so that emarginated or marginal people emerge through the building up of their own story; on the other hand, a "negative minimalism" takes place: characters stagnate in social and relational difficulties.

French authors of the extrême contemporain (selection)

- Eliette Abécassis
- Jean-Pierre Abraham
- Olivier Adam
- Emmanuel Adely
- Hafid Aggoune
- Eva Almassy
- Marc Alpozzo
- Jacques-Pierre Amette
- Jean-Pierre Andrevon
- Christine Angot
- Yann Apperry
- Claude Arnaud
- Pierre Assouline
- Alexis Aubenque
- Brigitte Aubert
- Antoine Audouard
- Yvan Audouard
- Pierre Autin-Grenier
- Ayerdhal
- François Bégaudeau
- Frédéric Beigbeder
- Pierre Bergounioux
- Arno Bertina
- Jacques A. Bertrand
- François Bon
- Michel Chaillou
- Christophe Claro
- Philippe Claudel
- Philippe Delerm
- Christine Deroin
- Maryline Desbiolles
- Michèle Desbordes
- Virginie Despentes
- Jean Echenoz
- Annie Ernaux
- Maxence Fermine
- Michael Ferrier
- Alain Fleischer
- Christian Gailly
- Sylvie Germain
- Michel Houellebecq
- Frédéric-Yves Jeannet
- Jean-Marie Laclavetine
- Camille Laurens
- Gabriel Méxène
- Pierre Michon
- Alain Nadaud
- Claude Ollier
- Christian Oster
- Daniel Pennac
- Pascal Quignard
- Jean Rolin
- Olivier Rolin
- Tiphaine Samoyault
- Colombe Schneck
- Tanguy Viel
- Antoine Volodine
- Cécile Wajsbrot

== See also ==
- French literature
- List of French-language authors
