= Ports of Call (Maalouf novel) =

1996 novel by Amin Maalouf

- First edition with Syria - Vintage Travel Advertisement
- Author: Amin Maalouf
- Original title: Les Échelles du Levant
- Translator: Alberto Manguel
- Language: French
- Publisher: Éditions Grasset
- Publication date: 1996
- Publication place: France; Lebanon
- English publication date: 1999
- Pages: 298
- ISBN: 9782246497714

Ports of Call (French: Les Échelles du Levant) is a 1991 novel by the French-Lebanese writer Amin Maalouf. The narrative follows a married couple consisting of a Muslim man and a Jewish woman, Ossyane and Clara, who become separated after World War II. The échelles du Levant were Mediterranean seaports under Ottoman sovereignty where the French had traded from the 16th century with a near monopoly.

== Reception ==
William Ferguson wrote in The New York Times wrote that the protagonists' "marriage is presented here as an exemplary rejection of suspicion and hatred between peoples, most particularly in the Middle East. Perhaps the author's fondness for allegory is the reason Ossyane's tale sounds more like polished writing than real speech, and why the characters often seem more like ideas than people."

== See also ==
- 1996 in literature
- Contemporary French literature
