= On the Isle of Antioch =

2020 novel by Amin Maalouf

- Author: Amin Maalouf
- Original title: Nos frères inattendus
- Translator: Natasha Lehrer
- Language: French
- Publisher: Éditions Grasset
- Publication date: 20 September 2020
- Publication place: France
- English publication date: 5 December 2023
- Pages: 336
- ISBN: 978-2-246-82641-5

On the Isle of Antioch (French: Nos frères inattendus) is a 2020 novel by the French-Lebanese writer Amin Maalouf.

== Plot ==
The novel is told from the perspective of Alec Zander, a cartoonist who has settled on the small island of Antioch off the Atlantic coast of France, where he lives in semi-isolation. When communications temporarily go down and rumours emerge about nuclear war, he comes in contact with a secret society, les amis d'Empédocle (lit. 'the friends of Empedocles'), that functions as a parallel civilisation and has set out to prevent planetary destruction.

== Reception ==
Christophe Henning of La Croix called the book "epic and chilling" and wrote that it contains both criticism and humour. Khadija Khalifé of The French Review wrote that On the Isle of Antioch repeats the message from Maalouf's 2019 book Adrift: How Our World Lost Its Way, where human wisdom is the solution to threatening apocalypse. She wrote that a strength of the book is its combination of optimism and refusal to deny real problems. Kirkus Reviews called it "an elegant portrait of a dying world" and compared Maalouf to Arturo Pérez-Reverte in the way he handles speculative fiction.
