= Grinda (surname) =

Grinda is a French surname. Notable people with the surname include:

- Édouard Grinda (1866–1959), French politician
- Fabrice Grinda, French businessman
- Jean-Louis Grinda (born 1960), Monegasque opera manager and politician
- Jean-Noël Grinda (born 1936), French tennis player
- Grinda Brothers, pipe organ builders
