= Aminata Sow Fall =

Senegalese-born author (born 1941)

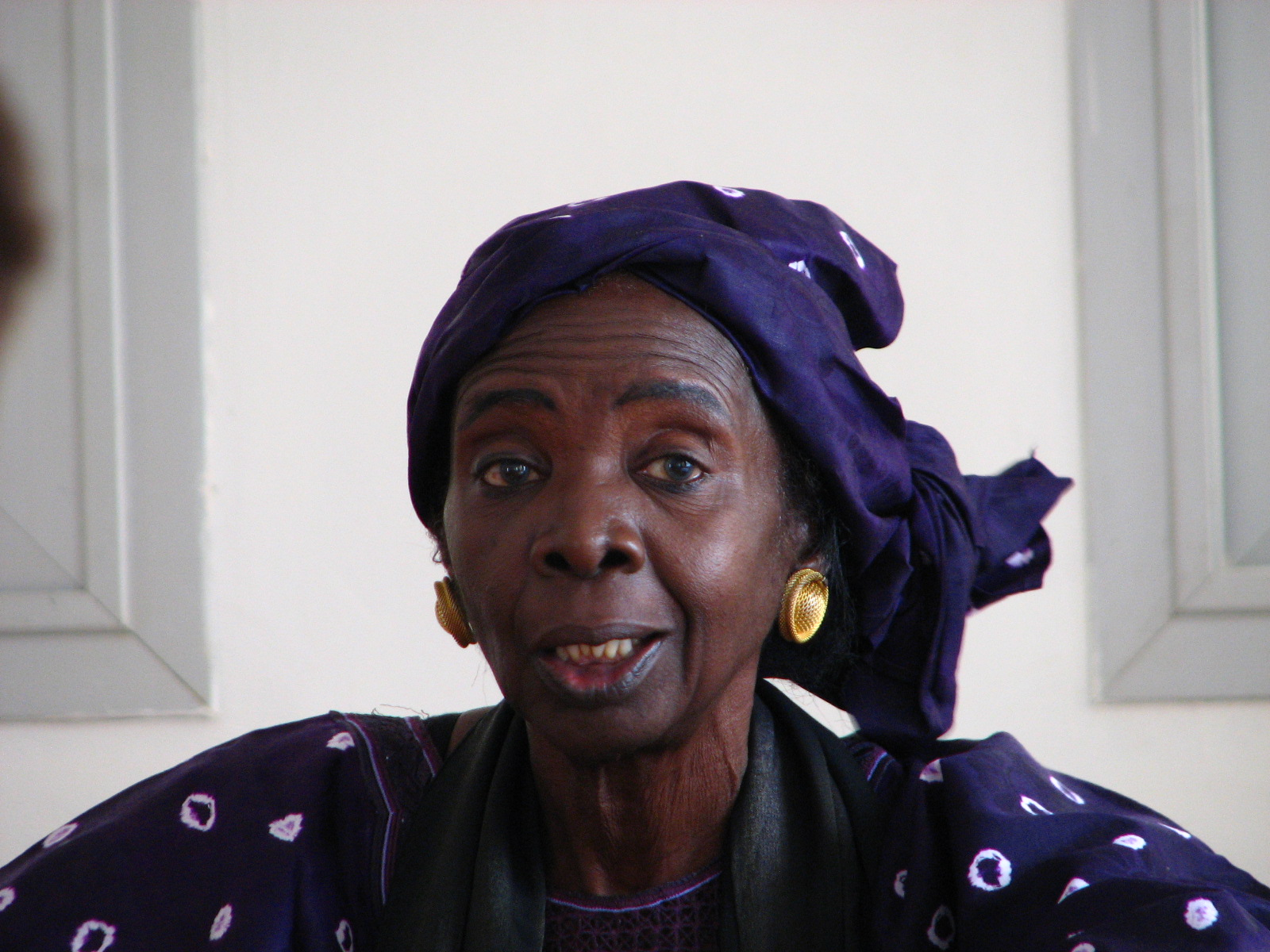
- Born: April 27, 1941 (age 85); Saint-Louis, Senegal
- Education: Sorbonne
- Children: 7
- Writing career
- Language: Wolof, French
- Genres: Novel; short story
- Notable work: La Grève des bàttu (The Beggars' Strike)
- Notable awards: Grand prix littéraire d'Afrique noire (1980); Prix International Alioune Diop (1982)

Aminata Sow Fall (born April 27, 1941) is a Senegalese-born author. While her native language is Wolof, her books are written in French. She is considered "the first published woman novelist from francophone Black Africa".

== Life ==
She was born in Saint-Louis, Senegal, where she grew up before moving to Dakar to finish her secondary schooling. After this, she earned a degree in Modern Languages at the Sorbonne in Paris, France, and became a teacher upon returning to Senegal. She was a member of the Commission for Educational Reform responsible for the introduction of African literature into the French syllabus in Senegal, before becoming director of La Propriété littéraire (The Literary Property) in Dakar (1979–88). She was the Director of the Literature Section of the Ministry of Culture and also became the Director of the Centre d'Etudes des Civilations, a center that researches Senegal's culture and oral literature. Her works are often concerned with social issues, such as poverty and corruption, and with her experience in both Paris and Senegal, she explores the many of traditions and cultures within both of these societies.

She was appointed the first woman president of Senegal's Writers' Association in 1985. Two years later, in 1987, she founded the "Centre Africain d'Animation et d'Echanges Culturels", an organisation that promotes young writers through literature festivals, seminars, and competitions, publishing them in the affiliated publishing house Éditions Khoudia, which she founded in 1990. She is a member of the Ordre de Mérite. Senegal's Directorate of Books and Reading named their "Aminata Sow Fall Prize for Creativity" after her, a manuscript prize they set up in conjunction with the International Book Fair to support young literary creators. She played the part of Aunt Oumy in Djibril Diop Mambéty's classic 1973 road movie Touki Bouki.

Growing up in an education system designed and run by the French, Sow Fall was only exposed to a few names from African literature growing up, since this was a system that prioritised Western names and titles. With this experience of living and being educated in both non-Western Senegal and Western France, Sow Fall separated herself from other African writers, who, she expresses, often feel that they must situate themselves in relation to the West. She feels that African literature would gain from a sense of self-discovery through writing, a common experience for Western authors, and from leaving behind the self-consciousness which she feels many African authors have historically carried into their literature.

== Awards ==
- 1980 – Grand prix littéraire d'Afrique noire for La Grève des bàttu.
- 1982 – Prix International Alioune Diop for L'Appel des arènes.
- 1997 – honorary doctorate from Mount Holyoke College, South Hadley, Massachusetts.

== Writing ==
Sow Fall's books include:

- Le Revenant, Nouvelles Éditions africaines, 1976. ISBN 2 7236 0109 9.
- L'empire du mensonge (2018). ISBN 979-1035600068
- Femmes d'Afrique (2001). ISBN 9782842612979
- La Grève des bàttu (1979); Nouvelles Éditions africaines, 1980; Serpent à plumes (paperback 2001), ISBN 2-84261-250-7
  - The Beggars' Strike, trans. Dorothy Blair, Longman (1986), ISBN 0-582-00243-5. Extracts in Daughters of Africa, ed. Margaret Busby, 1992.
- L'Appel des arènes (The Call of the Arena) (1982); Nouvelles Éditions africaines, 1993. ISBN 2 7236 0837 9.
- Ex-père de la nation: roman, Paris: L'Harmattan, 1987. ISBN 2 85802 875 3.
- Douceurs du bercail, Nouvelles Éditions ivoiriennes, 1998. ISBN 2 911725 46 8.
- Le jujubier du patriarche: roman, Serpent à Plumes, 1998
- Sur le flanc gauche du Belem. Arles: Actes Sud, 2002. ISBN 2 7427 4044 9.
- Un grain de vie et d'espérance. Paris: Françoise Truffaut éditions, 2002. ISBN 2-951661-45-2.
- Festins de la détresse: roman. Editions d'en bas. 2005. ISBN 978-2-8290-0318-9.
- L'Empire du mensonge, Le Serpent à Plumes, 2017, ISBN 9791035600075.

The film Battu (2000) by director Cheick Oumar Sissoko is based on Sow Fall's novel La Grève des bàttu.
