= Samarkand (novel) =

1988 novel by Amin Maalouf

- Book cover
- Author: Amin Maalouf
- Original title: Samarcande
- Translator: Russell Harris
- Language: French
- Publisher: J.C. Lattès
- Publication date: 1988
- Publication place: France; Lebanon
- English publication date: 1994
- Pages: 276
- ISBN: 2-7242-4133-9

Samarkand (French: Samarcande), written by French-Lebanese writer Amin Maalouf, is a 1988 historical fiction novel that revolves around the 11th-century Persian poet Omar Khayyám and his poetry collection Rubaiyat. The novel received the Prix Maison de la Presse.

== Plot ==
The first half of the story is set in Persia (present-day Iran) and Central Asia in the 11th century, and revolves around the scientist, philosopher, and poet Omar Khayyám. It recounts the creation of his Rubaiyat throughout the history of the Seljuk Empire, his interactions with historical figures such as Vizir Nizam al-Mulk and Hassan al-Sabbah of the Order of the Assassins, and his love affair with a female poet of the Samarkand court.

The second half of the story documents the efforts of a fictional American named Benjamin Omar Lesage to obtain the (fictional) original copy of the Rubaiyat, witnessing Persian history throughout the Persian Constitutional Revolution of 1905-1907, only to lose this manuscript in the sinking of the RMS Titanic.

== Reception ==
Ahmed Rashid reviewed the book for The Independent, and wrote:

Maalouf has written an extraordinary book, describing the lives and times of people who have never appeared in fiction before and are unlikely to do so again. The book is far more than a simple historical novel; like the intricate embroidery of an oriental carpet it weaves back and forth through the centuries, linking the poetry, philosophy and passion of the Sufi past with modernism.

== See also ==
- Three Schoolfellows
- 1988 in literature
- 20th-century French literature
- Malik-Shah I
- Alp Arslan
