= The Gardens of Light =

1991 novel by Amin Maalouf

- First edition
- Author: Amin Maalouf
- Original title: Les jardins de lumière
- Translator: Dorothy S. Blair
- Language: French
- Publisher: Lattès
- Publication date: 1991
- Publication place: France; Lebanon
- English publication date: 1996
- Pages: 317
- ISBN: 2253061778

The Gardens of Light (French: Les jardins de lumière) is a 1991 novel by the French-Lebanese writer Amin Maalouf. It focuses on the Parthian religious thinker Mani, founder of Manichaeism.

== Reception ==
David Guy wrote in The New York Times, "The Gardens of Light has the feel of a 1950s Hollywood epic, in which men gesture boldly and deliver words that deserve to be immediately carved in stone. ... Maalouf's epic style and wooden characters, as rendered here in Dorothy S. Blair's functional translation from the French, are burdensome. We follow Mani's actions, but we long for an imaginative journey into his inner life, some insight into how his liberal convictions were formed at a time when so much religious belief was marked by extreme factionalism and rigidity."

Kirkus Reviews described the book as a "fine meditative historical novel", "obviously scrupulously researched", "intermittently discursive"", and "suffused with a (nicely translated) dramatic lyricism".

== See also ==
- 1991 in literature
- Contemporary French literature
