= In the Name of Identity =

1998 novel by Amin Maalouf

In the Name of Identity: Violence and the Need to Belong
- Original edition; cover art: "Cain slaying Abel" by Peter Paul Rubens
- Original title: Les Identités Meurtrières
- Translator: Barbara Bray
- Language: French
- Published: 1998 (B. Grasset)
- English publication date: 2001 (Time-Warner)
- ISBN: 2-246-54881-0 French
- OCLC: 46937451

In the Name of Identity: Violence and the Need to Belong (French: Les Identités Meurtrières) is a 1998 book by Amin Maalouf, in which he discusses the identity crisis that Arabs have experienced since the establishment of continuous relationships with the west, adding his personal dimension as a Lebanese Christian.

This work is divided into five major chapters, "Identity and Belonging", "When Modernity Comes From the Other", "The Era of Cosmic Tribals", "Taming the Shrew" and a glossary. He begins with universal values of identity, which he dissects, describes the extremes, then applies them to the Levant. He attempts to describe how the average modern Arab feels, along a wide spectrum of ideologies in practice throughout the Arab world...from religious beliefs and traditional practices to total secularism.

The book is intended for both Arabs and Westerners (as well as for people with mixed heritage), and also sheds light on recent events in the Arab world, from civil wars to relations with the west.
