= Olympe Bhêly-Quenum =

Beninese writer, journalist and magazine editor (born 1926)

- Born: 20 September 1926 (age 100); Ouidah, Benin
- Occupations: Writer, journalist and magazine editor
- Notable work: Le Chant du lac
- Awards: Grand prix littéraire d'Afrique noire

Olympe Bhêly-Quenum (born 20 September 1926) is a Beninese writer, journalist and magazine editor. He is the nephew of anthropologist Maximilien Quenum-Possy-Berry.

== Life and career ==
Born in the city of Ouidah, Benin (formerly Dahomey), Bhêly-Quenum had his primary education in Benin from 1938 to 1944, after which he traveled throughout his native country, Nigeria, his maternal grandmother's country, and Ghana, where he learned English. In 1948, he went to France and undertook his secondary studies at the College Littré, in Avranches, Normandy (Manche). He worked as a teacher and trained as a diplomat, before turning to journalism. He was editor-in-chief and then director of an African magazine entitled La Vie Africaine until 1964. He subsequently joined UNESCO in Paris.

He is the author of several works of fiction published in French. He won the Grand prix littéraire d'Afrique noire for Le Chant du lac in 1966. His first novel Un piège sans fin (1960) was translated into English by Dorothy Blair as Snares Without End (Longman, 1981) and has been called "an un-put-downable tragedy".

== Works ==
- Un piège sans fin (Stock, 1960; 1978). Translated by Dorothy S. Blair as Snares Without End (Longman, 1981)
- Le Chant du lac (Editions Présence Africaine)
- Liaison d'un été et autres récits (1968)
- L'initié (1979)
- Les Mille Haches (1981)
- Les Francs-Maçons (1997)
- La naissance d’Abikou ("Abikou's birth", 1998)
- C'était à Tigony (2000). As She Was Discovering Tigony, trans. Tomi Adeaga (Michigan State University Press, 2017)
