= La Grève des bàttu =

1979 novel by Aminata Sow Fall

- Author: Aminata Sow Fall

La Grève des bàttu (transl. The Beggars' Strike) is the second novel by Aminata Sow Fall, published in Dakar, Senegal, in 1979 by Nouvelles Éditions Africaines. In 1980, the book won the Grand prix littéraire d'Afrique noire. An English-language translation by Dorothy Blair was published under the title The Beggars' Strike in 1981 by Longman.

La Grève des bàttu was republished in France in 2001 by Le Serpent à plumes.

== Plot ==
The novel describes the revolt of beggars against a politician who expels them from the city, and the consequences of their begging strike in a society where alms are a matter of both religious and social obligation.

Beggars, cripples, lepers, and children left to their own devices, the poorest, are in the habit of begging with their bowl in the busiest places in the city. They station themselves near mosques, crossroads, pedestrian crossings where residents, practicing Islam or having to make sacrifices to obtain a favor, give them alms. The authorities, concerned about the country's image with tourists, expel this poor population far from the city. In reaction, they unanimously decide to strike and refuse alms from anyone.

The director of the sanitation service of the city of Dakar, who wants to become vice-president, is ordered by the marabout to give portions of sheep to the poor as a sacrifice. The distancing of the poor, which he himself organized, and their refusal of the slightest alms, turns them against him.

== Bibliography ==
- Fall, Aminata Sow (2009-10-21). "La Grève des bàttu". Librairie Eyrolles (in French).
- Fall, Aminata Sow (1981). The Beggars' Strike, Or, The Dregs of Society. Translated by Dorothy S. Blair. Harlow: Longman. ISBN 978-0-582-78530-4.
