= Balthasar's Odyssey =

2000 novel by Amin Maalouf

- first edition
- Author: Amin Maalouf
- Original title: Le Périple de Baldassare
- Translator: Barbara Bray
- Genre: historical novel
- Publisher: éditions Grasset
- Publication date: 2000
- English publication date: 2002
- ISBN: 1-55970-702-X
- OCLC: 54998107

Balthasar's Odyssey (French: Le Périple de Baldassare) is a 2000 novel by Amin Maalouf set in 17th century Europe and the Levant. Originally written in French, it was shortlisted for the International Dublin Literary Award in 2004.

The plot concerns the journey of a Genoese librarian living in the town of Gibelet (Byblos in Lebanon) named Balthasar who seeks a sacred book The Hundredth Name that is said to contain the unknown and sacred name of God, whose knowledge seems to be the answer for the salvation of souls at Doomsday in the apocalyptic year of 1666. During his trip, Balthasar travels through the Ottoman Empire, to Italy, and London, while experiencing a myriad of problems due to the accursed book.

== Plot ==
Before the dawn of the apocalyptic 'Year of the Beast' in 1666, Balthasar Embriaco, a Levantine merchant, sets out on an adventure that will take him across the breadth of the civilised world from Constantinople, through the Mediterranean, to London, shortly before the Great Fire.

The narrative Balthazar as he searches for a rare book tutled The Hundredth Name, whose contents are believed to hold major significance for the world's future. Based on the Islamic tradition of the ninety-nine names of God in Quran, Balthazar believes that discovering the hidden hundredth name will ensure his salvation.
