= Villefranche-sur-Mer =

Commune in Provence-Alpes-Côte d'Azur, France

Villefranche-sur-Mer Vilafranca de Mar (Occitan) Villafranca Marittima (Italian)
- Commune
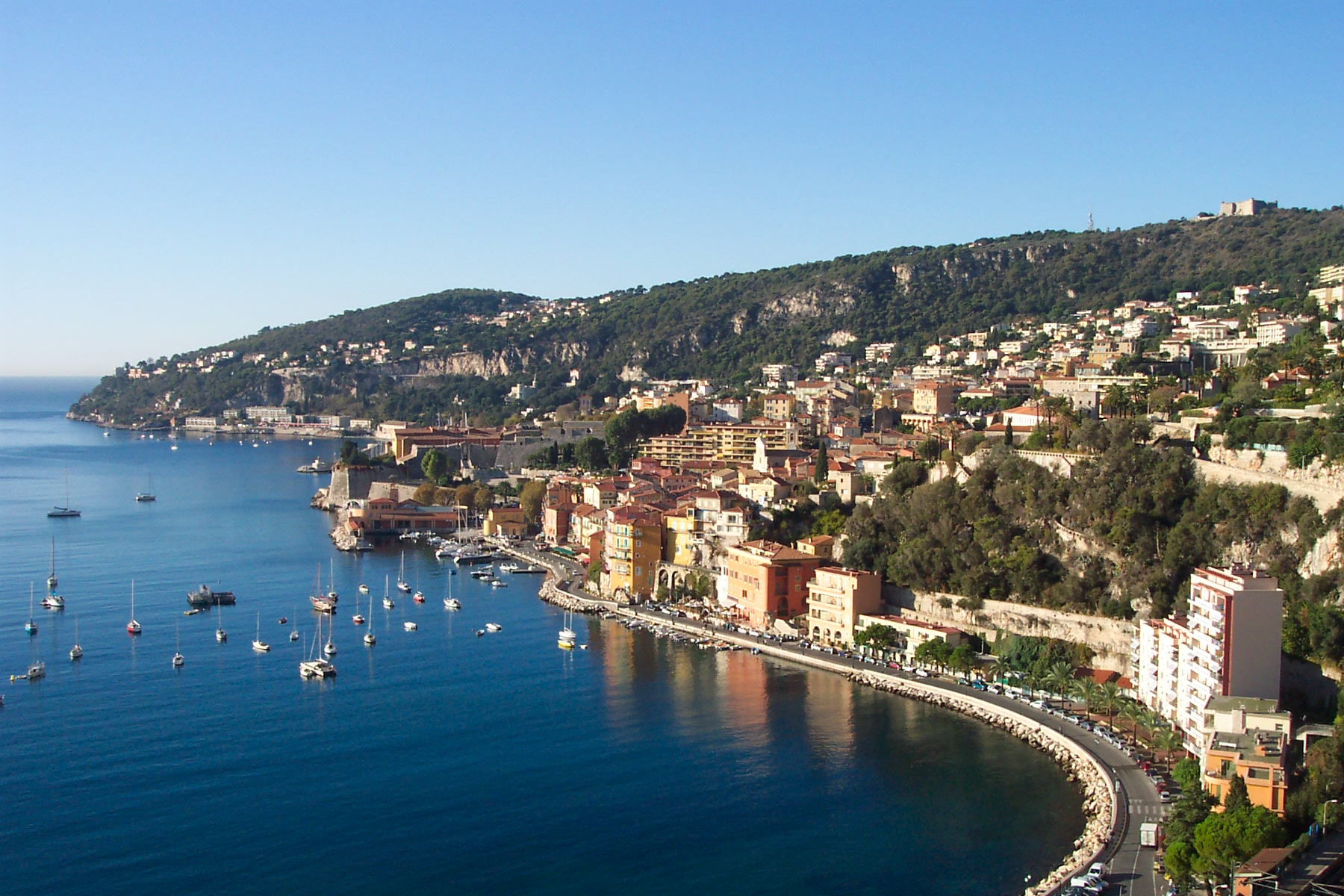
- A view of the harbour at Villefranche-sur-Mer

- Coat of arms
- Location of Villefranche-sur-Mer
- Location within France Location within Provence-Alpes-Côte d'Azur
- Coordinates: 43°42′18″N 7°18′45″E
- Country: France
- Region: Provence-Alpes-Côte d'Azur
- Department: Alpes-Maritimes
- Arrondissement: Nice
- Canton: Beausoleil
- Intercommunality: Métropole Nice Côte d'Azur

Government
  - Mayor (2026–32): Robert Capelier
- Area^{1}: 4.88 km^{2} (1.88 sq mi)
- Highest elevation: 575 m (1,886 ft)
- Lowest elevation: 0 m (0 ft)
- Population (2023): 5,008
  - Density: 1,030/km^{2} (2,660/sq mi)
- Demonym: Villefranchois
- Time zone: UTC+01:00 (CET)
  - Summer (DST): UTC+02:00 (CEST)
- INSEE/Postal code: 06159 /06230
- Website: villefranche-sur-mer.fr
- ^{1} French Land Register data, which excludes lakes, ponds, glaciers > 1 km^{2} (0.386 sq mi or 247 acres) and river estuaries.

Villefranche-sur-Mer (US: /ˌviːl(ə)ˈfrɒ̃ʃ sʊər ˈmɛər/; French: [vilfʁɑ̃ʃ syʁ mɛʁ]; Occitan: Vilafranca de Mar [ˌvilɔˈfʀaŋkɔ de ˈmaʀ]; Italian: Villafranca Marittima [ˌvillaˈfraŋka maˈrittima]) is a seaside resort town in the Alpes-Maritimes department in the Provence-Alpes-Côte d'Azur region on the French Riviera. It is located just east of Nice and southwest of the Principality of Monaco, which is west of the French-Italian border. Its name translates into "Free City on Sea" in Old French.

== Geography ==
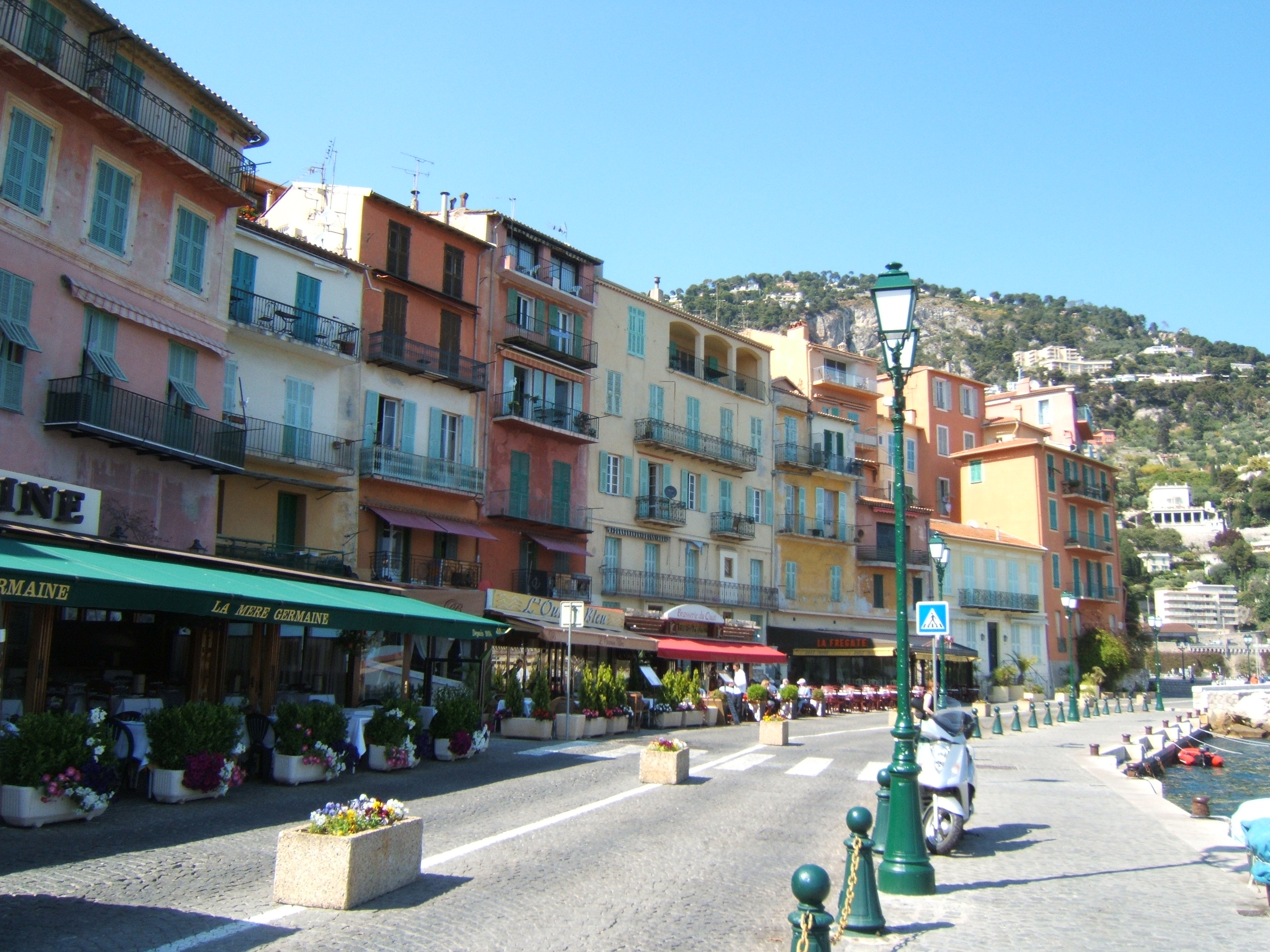
The pier named after Amédée Courbet in Villefranche-sur-Mer

Villefranche-sur-Mer is immediately to the east of the city of Nice, along Mont Boron, Mont Alban and Mont Vinaigrier, and 6.2 mi (10 km) southwest of Monaco. The bay (rade) of Villefranche is one of the deepest natural harbours of any port in the Mediterranean Sea and provides safe anchorage for large ships from easterly winds. Reaching depths of 320 feet (98 m) between the Cape of Nice and Cap Ferrat, it extends to the south to form a 1,700-foot (518 m) abyss known as the undersea Canyon of Villefranche about 1 nautical mile (1.9 km; 1.2 mi) off the coastline. The Bay is the place where the United States Sixth Fleet moors when cruising the Mediterranean coast.

The city limits extend to the hills surrounding the bay climbing from sea level to an altitude of 1,893 feet (577 m), the highest point of Mont-Leuze, reflecting on land the features found offshore. The Basse Corniche runs through Vlllefranche with the Moyenne Corniche above and the Haute Corniche above that entering the farthest reach to the west of the Alpes-Maritimes.

== History ==
The site of what is now Villefranche and surrounding Beaulieu-sur-Mer and Saint-Jean-Cap-Ferrat has been settled since prehistoric times. Celto-ligurian tribes roamed the area and established farming communities on the surrounding hills. The Greeks and later the Romans used the natural harbour as a stop-over en route to the Greek settlements around the Western Mediterranean. After the conquest of Gaul by Julius Caesar, the Romans built an extension of the Via Aurelia (Aurelian Way), which passed through the settlement of Montolivo.

By the fall of the Carolingian Empire, the area was part of Lotharingia and later part of the County of Provence. In 1295, Charles II, Duke of Anjou, then Count of Provence, enticed the inhabitants of Montolivo and surroundings to settle closer to the coastline in order to secure the area from pirates. By charter, he established Villefranche as a "free port", thus the name, granting tax privileges and port fee rights that lasted well into the 18th century.

By 1388, East Provence became part of the Duchy of Savoy as a result of the disputed succession to the heirless Queen Joan I of Naples. For the next 400 years, the area known as the County of Nice was hotly disputed between the Holy Roman Empire to which Savoy was an ally and the French.

In 1543, the Franco-Turkish armies sacked and occupied the city after the siege of Nice, prompting Duke Emmanuel Philibert to secure the site by building an impressive citadel and a fort on nearby Mont Alban. In the late 17th century, the area fell to the French but was returned to Savoy after the Peace of Utrecht.

During the 18th century, the city lost some of its maritime importance to the new harbour being built in Nice but remained a military and naval base. In 1744, a Franco-Spanish army under the Prince of Conti overran the Piedmontese regiments of Charles Emmanuel III of Sardinia at the Fort of Mont Alban in the heights above the town.

In 1793, the French returned to re-occupy Villefranche and the county of Nice remained part of the Napoleonic Empire until 1814. It was returned to the Kingdom of Sardinia by the Congress of Vienna.

In 1860, as a consequence of the Risorgimento, it was given to France by treaty following a plebiscite.

By the late 19th century, it had become an important Imperial Russian Navy base and the Russians established an oceanographic laboratory in the old lazaret.

The site was also the winter residence for royalty and wealthy visitors.

Villefranche's bay is notable for reaching a significant depth only a short distance from shore. As a result, it has become an important port over the years. Since World War I, the United States Navy has called on a regular basis, making Villefranche the home port of the U.S. 6th Fleet from 1948 to February 1966, when French President Charles de Gaulle withdrew France from NATO and required U.S. forces to leave. Just prior to 1966, the flagship of the Commander Sixth Fleet rotated between USS Springfield and USS Little Rock. Since the 1980s Villefranche has been used by cruise ships. It is the most visited cruise ship port of call in France.

View of the town from the M6098 road

== Population ==
Villefranche is now part of the Urban community of Nice Côte d'Azur and so can be considered a suburb of the Nice metropolitan area. The decrease in population in recent years and especially in the 1990s can be attributed to the cost of real estate and an increase of part-time residents, who typically are not counted in the census. But Villefranche's aging population, like elsewhere in the eastern part of the Alpes-Maritimes, is not being replaced by younger people at the same rate as in the rest of the département.

Historical population
Year	Pop.	±% p.a.
1968	6,790	—
1975	7,200	+0.84%
1982	7,363	+0.32%
1990	8,080	+1.17%
1999	6,833	−1.85%
2007	6,662	−0.32%
2012	5,443	−3.96%
2017	5,091	−1.33%
2023	5,008	−0.27%
Source: INSEE

== Economy ==
The main activity remains tourism, with hotels and restaurants employing a sizeable portion of the population. Traditional activities, like fishing, have now given way to sea-related activities, such as sailing and deep sea diving. Some dockyard activity remains at the harbour of “la Darse” but most of it has now been moved to Antibes. Residential construction and maintenance, which provided a lot of employment in the mid 20th century, has now subsided considerably.

== Places of interest ==
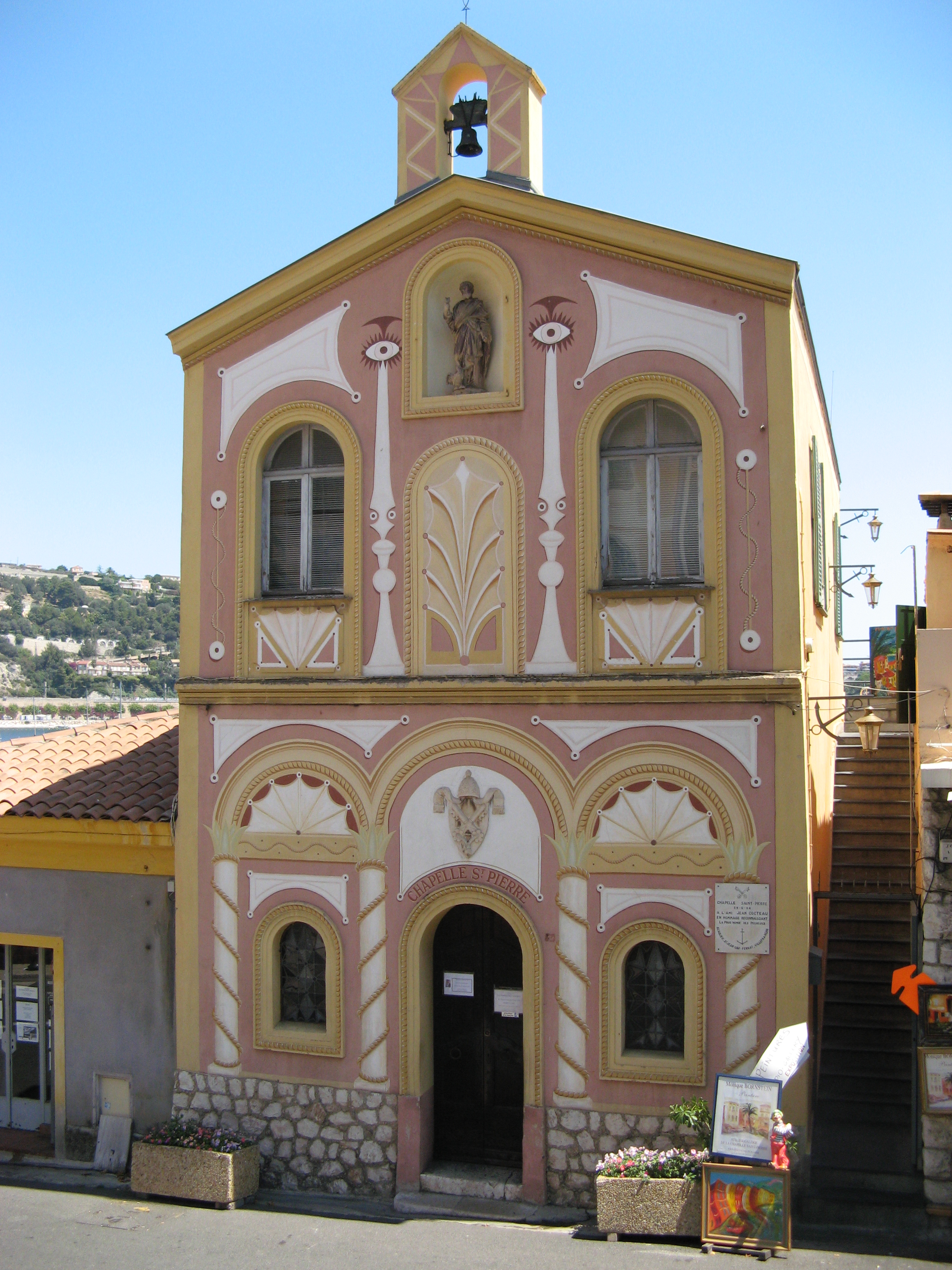
The Chapelle Saint-Pierre (Saint Peter's Chapel) dates from the sixteenth century

=== Churches and chapels ===
- Église Saint-Michel (Saint Michael's Church) in the heart of old town, was built in the 1750s in the baroque Italian-style where originally stood a more modest early fourteenth century church. It houses various works of art, notably a large Saint Michael painting above the marble main altar, a recumbent sculpture Christ (18th century) known as the "Christ of the Galleys" and a polychrome wooden statue of San Rocco. The organ built by the Grinda Brothers in 1790 is one of the oldest of the County of Nice still in operation. The building was included in the French Historic Sites Registry in 1990.
- The Chapelle Saint-Pierre (Saint Peter's Chapel) dates from the sixteenth century. Used as a storeroom for local fishermen's nets and equipment for most of the 19th and early part of the 20th century, it was restored in 1957 with Jean Cocteau adding his now-famous murals depicting the life of the saint and of local fishermen. The building was included in the French Historic Sites Registry in 1995.

== Public collections ==
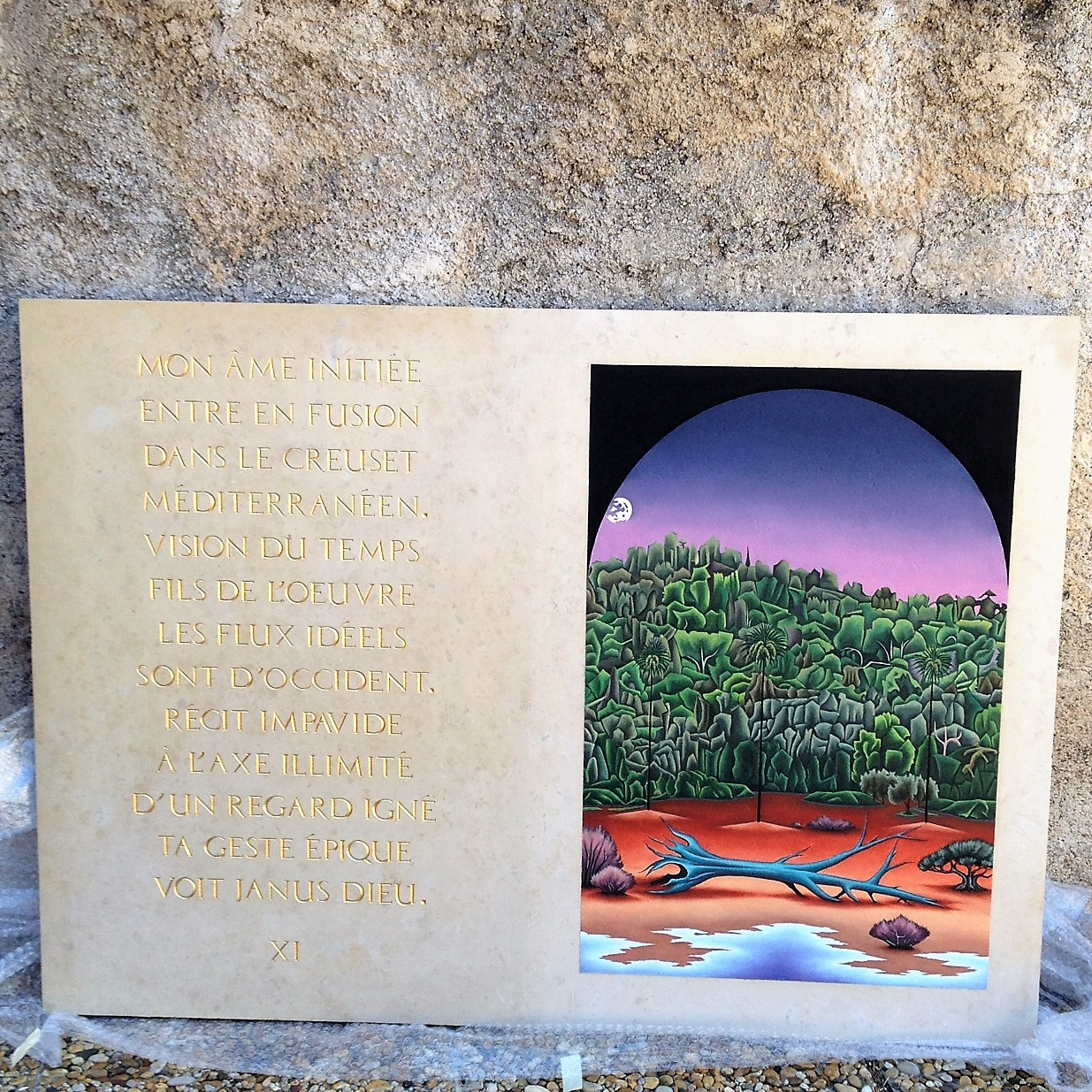
The Figures, Delta Book of Gabriel Méxène, page 11/12.

- The Figures, Delta Book of Gabriel Méxène, 2015 (Eight engraved, gilded and painted stones) Collections of the citadel museums. The Delta Book, known as the "Dragon Book of Piedmont-Savoy", contains 1400 Roman capital letters engraved by hand on Tavel marble.

== Other public buildings ==
- The old harbour of la Darse dates back to the 17th century. Built originally for the galleys of the Duke of Savoy, it is now a marina with dockyard activities for yachts. It is also the site of the oceanographic observatory Observatoire Oceanologique de Villefranche of the Pierre and Marie Curie University of Paris and of the French National Centre for Scientific Research with 3 laboratories (oceanology, marine geoscience and cell biology) and 150 personnels attached to it. Buildings and structures surrounding the harbour are also included in the French Historic Sites Registry since 1991.
- The Citadel built in 1557 now houses the Town Hall, a convention centre, three museums and an open-air theatre.
- The Rue Obscure or "Dark Street" is a passageway under the harbour front houses which dates back to 1260.
- The Villa Léopolda on the hills surrounding was once the residence of King Leopold II of Belgium and has been tagged as "the most expensive house in the world".

== Gallery ==
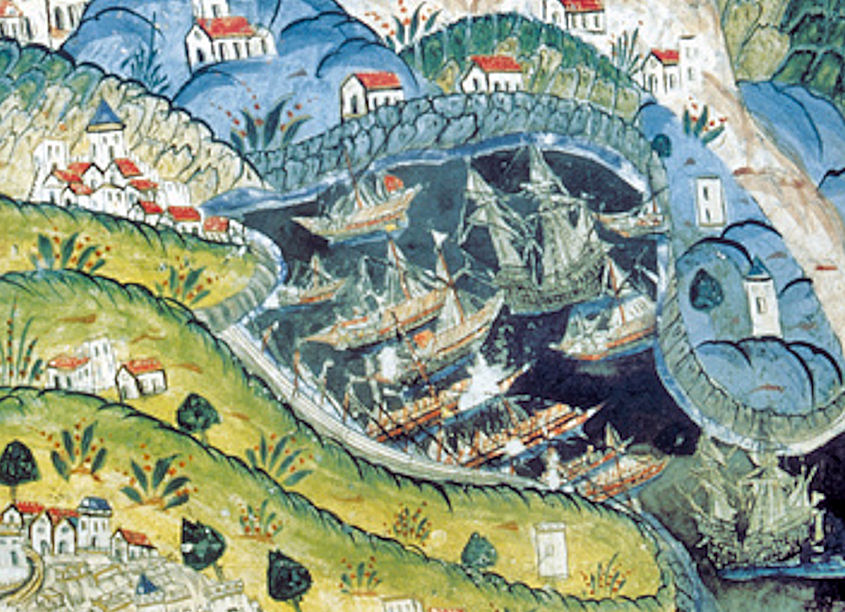
Ottoman Navy landing in Villefranche, during the 1543 Siege of Nice

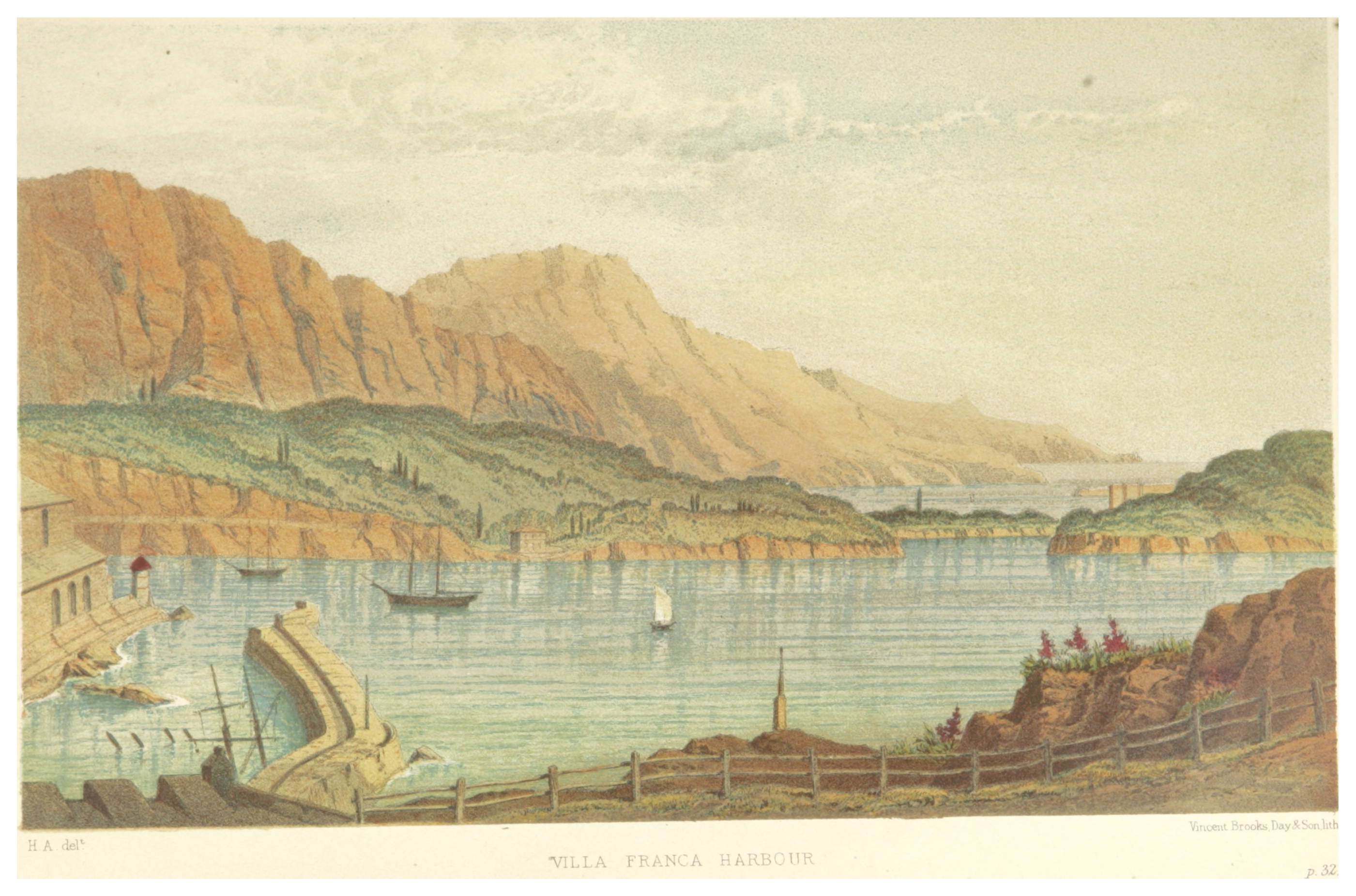
The Harbour in 1870

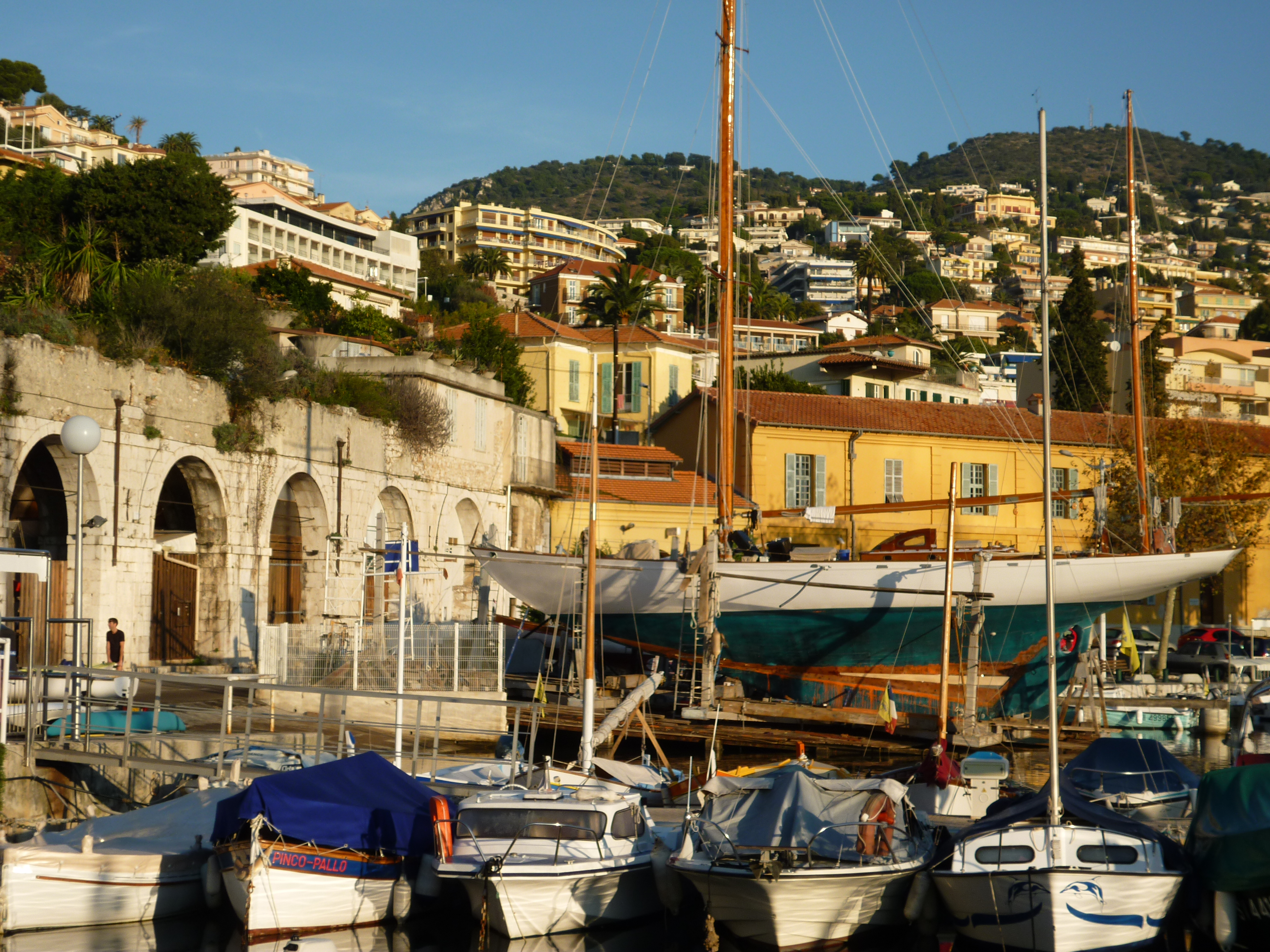
View on the old harbour of Darse de Villefranche-sur-Mer

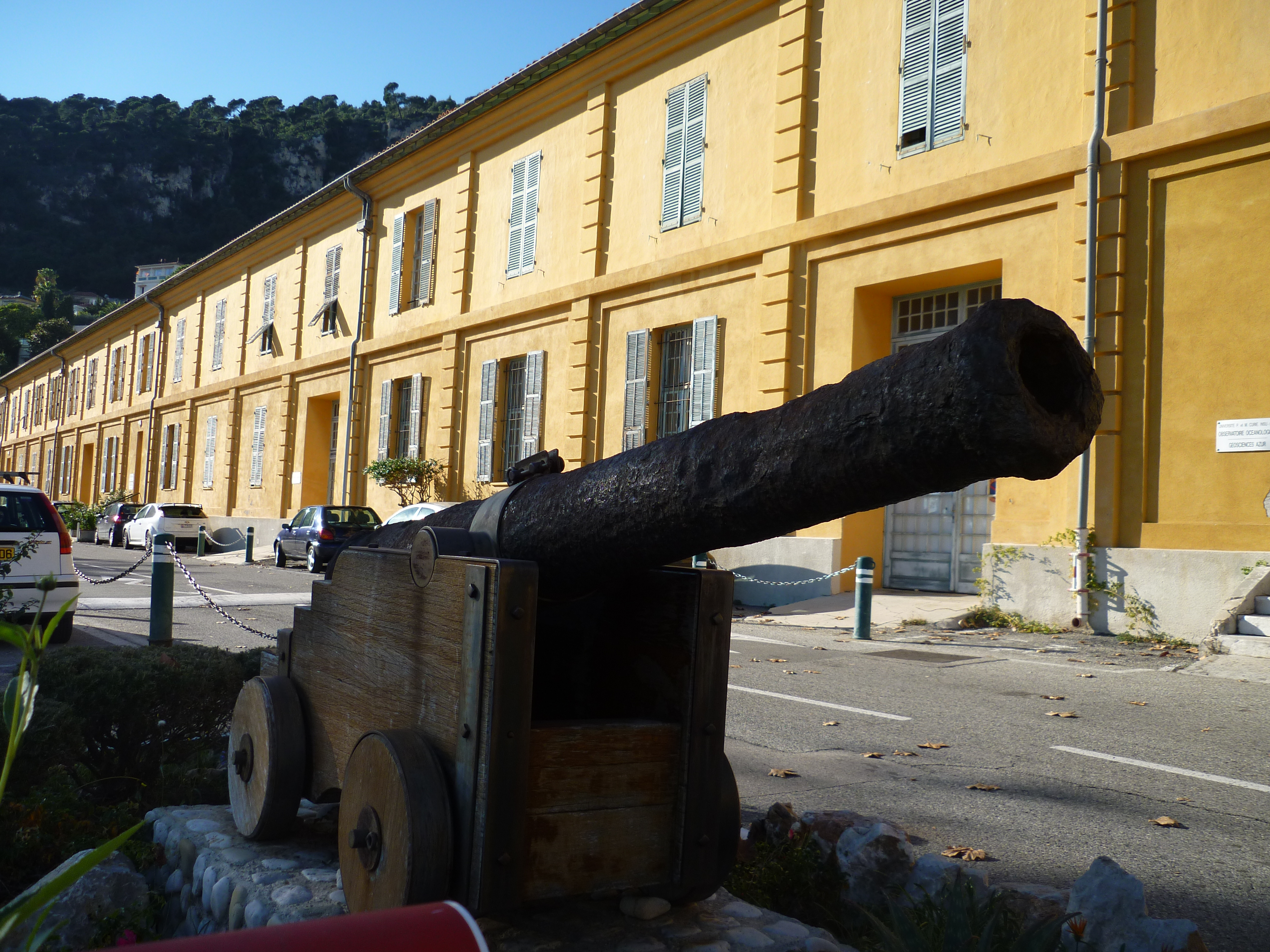
View on the Observatoire Oceanologique de Villefranche

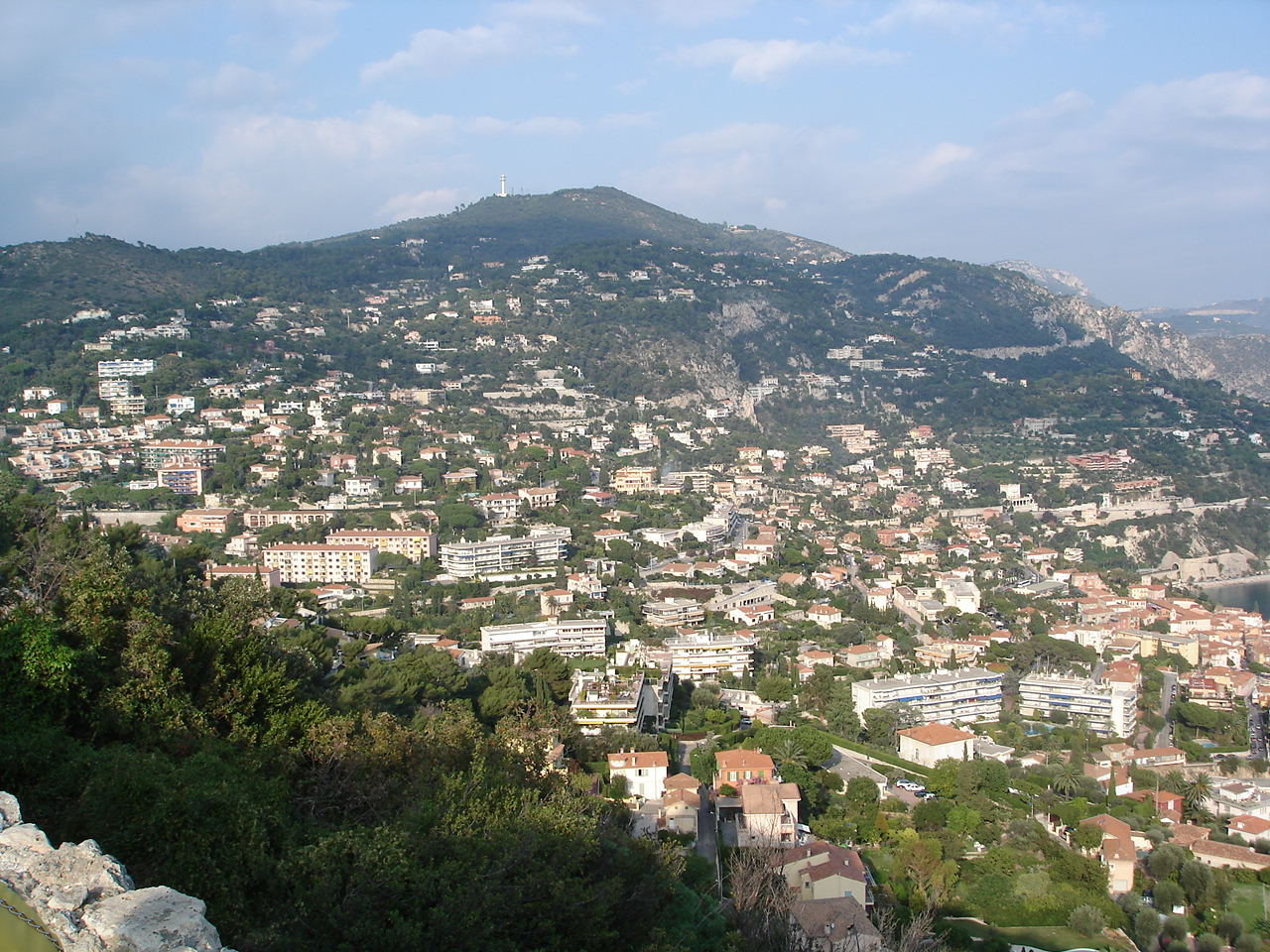
Hills surrounding Villefranche with Mont-Leuze in the background

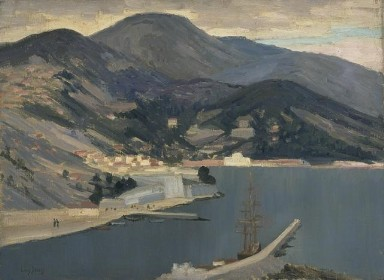
Port of Villefranche, 1930
by Louis Dewis

=== Public beaches ===
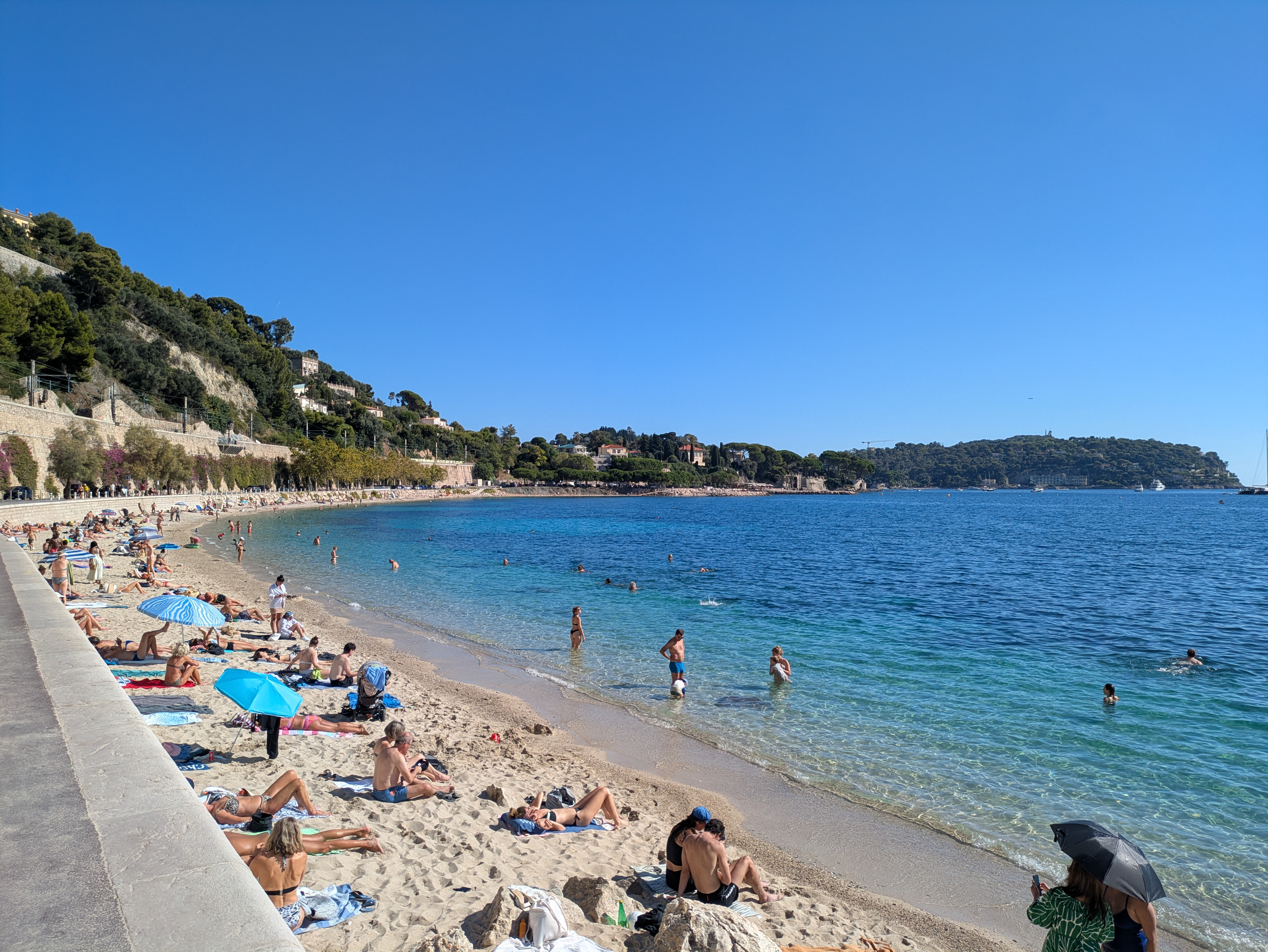
Plage des Marinières

- Plage des Marinières is the main beach and is located at the north end of the bay. It stretches for 700 m (0.43 mi) under the track of the railway line linking Nice to Italy.
- Plage de la Darse is a smaller pebble beach located behind the main jetty of the harbour of La Darse.

== Media ==
The old town and the bay have offered a natural set for movie makers. Among many productions to name just a few:

- Raoul Walsh’s Captain Horatio Hornblower R.N.
- Adventures of Captain Fabian with Errol Flynn
- Alfred Hitchcock’s To Catch a Thief
- The Count of Monte Cristo with Louis Jourdan
- Leo McCarey's An Affair to Remember with Cary Grant and Deborah Kerr
- The Madwoman of Chaillot with Katharine Hepburn
- Never Say Never Again with Sean Connery
- The Jewel of the Nile with Michael Douglas
- The Bourne Identity with Richard Chamberlain
- Killers with Ashton Kutcher,
- Maximum Risk with Jean-Claude Van Damme
- Dirty Rotten Scoundrels with Steve Martin and Michael Caine
- Ronin with Robert De Niro
- Absolutely Fabulous: The Movie with Jennifer Saunders and Joanna Lumley
- Riviera - Uk Sky production starring Julia Stiles and Anthony LaPaglia.

Villefranche-sur-Mer is also a harbour for visiting naval forces and particularly US Navy ships.

The façades of the buildings in the harbour were the inspiration for the film set in the Moteurs... Action! Stunt Show Spectacular at the Walt Disney Studios Park in Disneyland Paris and Disney's Hollywood Studios in Walt Disney World, Florida.

It was also at Villefranche-Sur-Mer that The Rolling Stones recorded their 1972 album Exile on Main St., at the Belle Epoque-era mansion Nellcôte.

Some scenes in Amy Plum's "Revenants" trilogy take place in Villefranche-sur-Mer.

== See also ==
- Communes of the Alpes-Maritimes department
- Russian Steam Navigation and Trading Company
- Villa Nellcôte
