= Grinda Brothers =

Organ builders

The Grinda Brothers were the official organ-builders to the King of Sardinia in the 18th century.

- Honoré Grinda (30 September 1754 in Nice – 15 June 1843 in Prats-de-Mollo) first learned carpentry with his grandfather, then became an apprentice under Jean-Esprit Isnard, a Dominican from Tarascon near Avignon, himself a noted organ-builder. In 1779, he learned the trade of pipe fitter in Toulouse with Grégoire Rabini.
- Antoine Grinda (1775 in Nice – 8 July 1835 in Perpignan), a younger brother of the former.

Both brothers worked as organ-builders mainly in the County of Nice, then part of the Kingdom of Sardinia. After the Napoleonic wars and the restitution of the region of Nice to the House of Savoy, work became scarce and in 1825 they moved to Cerdagne in the Pyrenees to continue their trade in Catalonia. They are credited with the creation of the following instruments

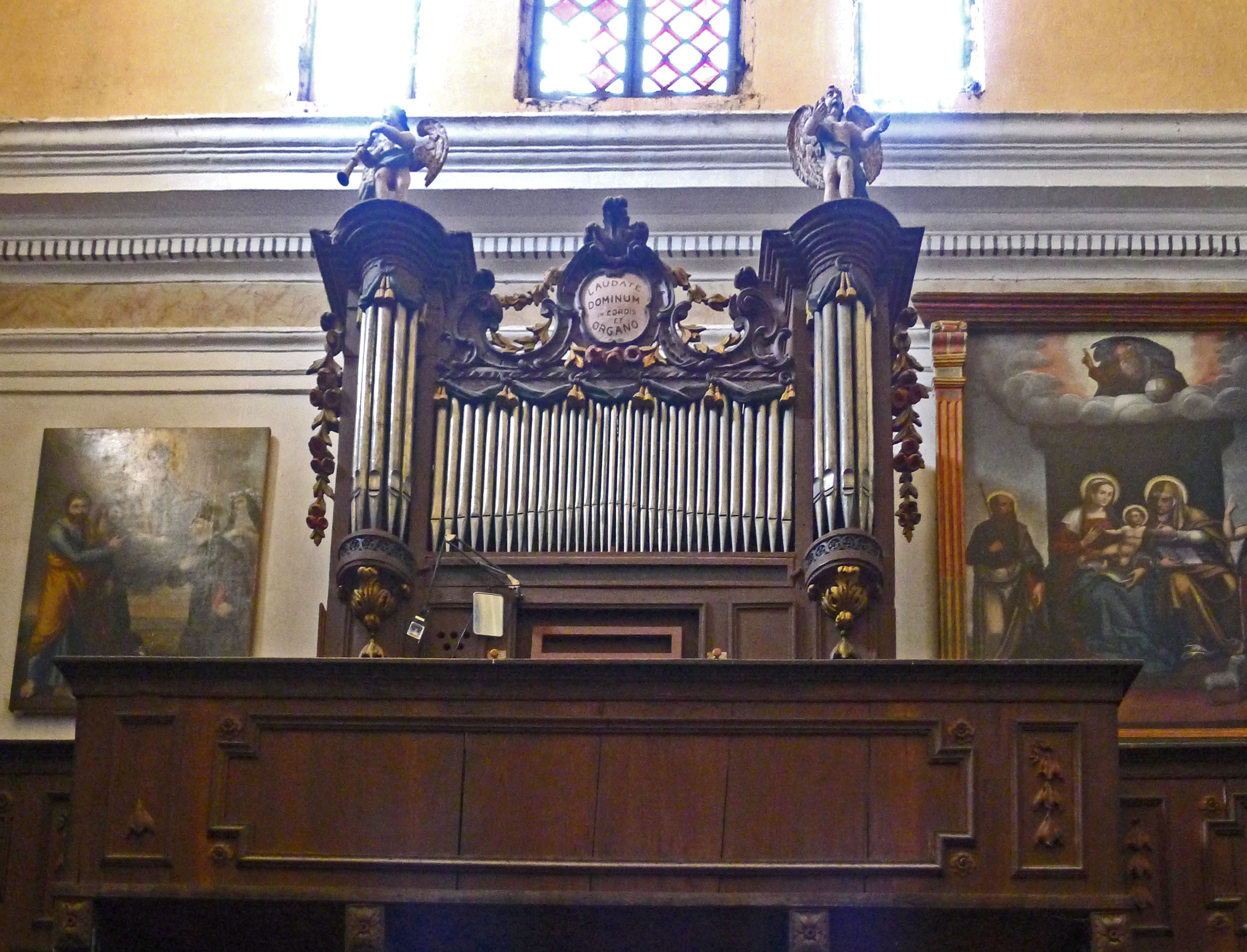
A Grinda organ

In the County of Nice:

- 1790 Villefranche-sur-Mer: Église Saint-Michel (St. Michael’s Church) - 1 manual, 13 stops – the oldest organ in the County of Nice still in operation. Restored in 1982 and declared a historic monument in 1990.
- 1791 L'Escarène: Église Saint-Pierre-aux-Liens (St. Peter in Chains’ Church) - 1 manual, restored by Cabourdin in 1984)
- 1792 Clans: Collégiale Sainte-Marie (St. Mary’s Collegial) - 1 manual, restored by Cabourdin in 1982)
- 1810-1811: Montalto, near Taggia, in nowadays Liguria then part of the Napoleonic department of Alpes-Maritimes

In Catalonia:

- Perpignan: Église Notre-Dame-de-la-Réal (instrument Joseph/Jean-Pierre Cavaillé ?), église Saint-Mathieu, église Saint-Jacques
- Prats-de-Mollo
- Rivesaltes - Eglise St André - built in 1824, restored by Jean Daldosso and his team from Gimont in 2000.
- Céret
- Puigcerda (Girona, Spain) - 3 manuals
