= Frédéric-Yves Jeannet =

Mexican writer

- Born: Frédéric-Yves Jeannet ca. 1959; Grenoble, France
- Occupations: Writer and professor

Academic background
- Education: University of Grenoble (BA)/(MA)

Frédéric-Yves Jeannet (French pronunciation: [fʁe.de.ʁik iv ʒa.nɛ], Spanish pronunciation: [ˈfɾeðeɾikiˌβes ˈxean'net]) is a writer and professor of French origin who emigrated to Mexico in his youth. He was born in Grenoble, France, in 1959 and left it in 1975. Jeannet earned B.A. and M.A. degrees in comparative literature at the University of Grenoble. He then lived in London until 1977 before moving to Mexico. He currently lives in Cuernavaca, Mexico.

Jeannet lived and lectured in New York from 1996 to 2004 at Montclair State University and later Cooper Union. He later lived in Wellington, New Zealand, from 2005 to 2008 as a professor of literature at the Victoria University of Wellington.

He published his first book, Si loin de nulle part in 1985, took up Mexican citizenship in 1987 and has since published books in both Spanish and French, among which Pensar la muerte and La luz del mundo in 1996, Cyclone (1997), Charité (Flammarion, 2000) and Recouvrance (Flammarion, 2007). He has also published book-length interviews with writers Michel Butor (1990), Annie Ernaux (2003), Hélène Cixous (2005) and Robert Guyon (2006). Jeannet's writings are "well known in avant-garde circles". Charité was described by Les Inrockuptibles, according to 3:AM Magazine, as "[the] season's most interesting read" in 2000.

Jeannet collaborated with artist Melvin Day in 2007 on a series of works based on Stabat Mater.

== Published books ==
- Jeannet, Frédéric-Yves (2000). Charité (French ed.). Paris: Groupe Flammarion. ISBN 2-08-068024-2.
- Frederic-Yves Jeannet, by Frederic-Yves Jeannet & Robert Guyon, Argol, ISBN 2-915978-14-X
- L'ile Dollo, by Frederic-Yves Jeannet & Philippe Dollo, Scheer, ISBN 2-915280-77-0
- Onze, Bernard Grasset, ISBN 2-246-58311-X
- Rencontre Terrestre: Arcachon. Roosevelt Island. Paris Montsouris. Manhattan. Cuernavaca, by Hélène Cixous & Frederic-Yves Jeannet, Galilée, ISBN 2-7186-0667-3
- Degustacion, by Michel Butor, Michel Butor Collection (Library of Congress), Frederic-Yves Jeannet & Antonio Marquet, Universidad Nacional Autónoma de México, ISBN 968-36-3061-8
- Lejos De Ninguna Parte, Universidad Autónoma Metropolitana, Unidad Azcapotzalco, ISBN 968-840-757-7
