= The Children of Men =

1992 dystopian novel by P. D. James

- First UK edition
- Author: P. D. James
- Cover artist: Irene von Treskow
- Language: English
- Genre: Dystopian
- Publisher: Faber and Faber (UK); Alfred A. Knopf (US)
- Publication date: 1992
- Publication place: United Kingdom
- Media type: Print (hardback & paperback)
- Pages: 241
- ISBN: 9780679418733
- OCLC: 26214321
- Dewey Decimal: 823/.914 20
- LC Class: PR6060.A467 C48 1993

The Children of Men is a dystopian novel by English writer P. D. James, published in 1992. Set in England in 2021, it centres on the results of mass infertility. James describes a United Kingdom that is steadily depopulating and focuses on a small group of resisters who do not share the disillusionment of the masses.

The book received very positive reviews from many critics such as Caryn James of The New York Times, who called it "wonderfully rich" and "a trenchant analysis of politics and power that speaks urgently". The academic Alan Jacobs said, "Of all James' novels, The Children of Men is probably the most pointed in its social criticism, certainly the deepest in its theological reflection."

About writing the story P. D. James said, "I thought, if there was no future, how would we behave?"

== Plot ==
=== Book One: Omega ===
This part alternates between first-person narrative in a diary of Dr. Theodore "Theo" Faron, an Oxford don, and the third person, still tightly focused on Theo.

It is January 2021, but the novel's events have their origin in 1995, "Year Omega". All human sperm, even frozen, "had lost its potency" and, with no scientific breakthroughs, mankind is preparing for extinction. People born in 1995 are called Omegas. "A race apart", they enjoy various prerogatives. The Omegas are beautiful (for females) and handsome (males), but spoiled, over-entitled, and egotistical because of their youth and luxurious lifestyle. They are violent, remote, and unstable. They regard elders with undisguised contempt, yet they are spared punishment due to their age. According to rumours, some countries sacrifice Omegas in fertility rituals. The last Omega ever born had just been killed in a pub brawl.

In 2006, Xan Lyppiatt, Theo's rich and charismatic cousin, appointed himself Warden of England in the last general election. As people have lost all interest in politics, Lyppiatt abolishes democracy. He is called a despot and tyrant by his opponents, but the new society is officially referred to as egalitarian.

Theo is approached by his ex-student, a woman named Julian, a member of a dissident group calling themselves the Five Fishes. Rolf, their leader and Julian's husband, is hostile; the others — Miriam (a former midwife), Gascoigne (a man from a military family), Luke (a priest), and Julian (the only other Christian of the five) — are more personable. They want Theo to approach Xan and ask for various reforms, including a return to a more democratic system. During their discussions, as Theo prepares to meet with Xan, the reader learns about the situation in the UK:

- Newborn animals (such as kittens and puppies) are doted upon and treated as infants, pushed in prams, and dressed in children's clothing. The latest trend is to have elaborate christening ceremonies for newborn pets. Many women are also obsessed with life-like dolls.
- The country is governed by decree of the five-member Council of England. Parliament has been reduced to an advisory role. The aims of the council are (1) protection and security, (2) comfort, and (3) pleasure, corresponding to the Warden's promises of: (1) freedom from fear, (2) freedom from want, and (3) freedom from boredom.
- The Grenadiers, formerly an elite regiment in the British Armed Forces, are the Warden's private army. The State Secret Police (SSP) ensures the council's decrees are executed.
- The courts still exist, but people are unwilling to serve in a jury anymore. "Under the new arrangements", defendants are tried by a judge and two magistrates. Convicted criminals are dumped at a penal colony on the Isle of Man. There is no remission, escape is almost impossible, even correspondence is forbidden. Instead of deportees growing their own food, the island is ruled by violent gangs. There is hunger and cannibalism.
- Every citizen is required to learn skills such as animal husbandry, which they might need if they happen to be among the last humans alive.
- Foreign workers are lured into the country and exploited. Young people, preferably Omegas, from poorer countries come to England "to do our dirty work". These "Sojourners" are sent back at age 60 ("forcibly repatriated"). British Omegas are not allowed to emigrate to prevent loss of labour.
- Elderly/infirm citizens have become a burden; nursing homes are for the privileged few. The rest are expected and sometimes forced to commit suicide by taking part in a "Quietus" (Council-sanctioned mass drowning).
- The state has opened "pornography centers". Twice a year, healthy women under 45 must submit to a gynecological examination, and most men must also have their sperm tested, to keep hope alive.

Theo's meeting, which turns out to be with the full Council of England, does not go well. Some members resent him because he resigned as Xan's advisor rather than share the responsibility of governing. Xan realises that Theo's suggestions came from others and makes clear that he will take action against dissidents if they are not "sensible".

In March, the Five Fishes distribute a leaflet detailing their demands, and the SSP visit Theo to drop hints. Meeting Julian by chance, he warns her that the SSP are getting close and the group needs to stop, and if the others will not, she should get out herself. She says "It’s better that we don’t see each other again"; he replies "If you ever need me send for me." That night Theo decides to leave England for the summer and visit the continent before nature overruns it and the society breaks down.

=== Book Two: Alpha ===
Soon after Theo's return, in October, Miriam comes to tell him that Gascoigne was arrested, trying to blow up a Quietus embarkation stage. The other Fishes need to go on the run before the investigators break him with drugs, and Julian wants Theo. Miriam reveals why Julian did not come herself: she is pregnant. Theo believes Julian is deceiving herself, but she lets him listen to her baby's heartbeat.

During the group's flight, Luke is killed protecting Julian in a confrontation with a wild gang of Omegas. Julian confesses that he and not Rolf was the child's father. Rolf, who believes he should rule the UK in Xan's place and provide his sperm to select fittest women, is angered at the discovery; he abandons the group to notify Xan.

The group arrives in a shack Theo knows of. Miriam delivers Julian's baby: a boy, not a girl as Julian had thought. Miriam goes to get more supplies; after she is gone too long, Theo finds her garrotted in a nearby house. Theo returns to Julian and soon she hears a noise: Xan, coming alone though backed by his forces.

The cousins speak outside. Xan mentions that both Rolf and Gascoigne are dead, and Theo refuses to become his lieutenant, though the only alternative is to be killed too. Both reach for their guns: the baby's sudden wailing startles Xan, causing him to miss, as Rolf had thought the baby would not be born for another month, while Theo, who was actually a better shot when they trained as youths, kills Xan. He takes from Xan's finger the Coronation Ring, which Xan had worn as a symbol of authority, and seems poised to become the new leader of the UK, at least temporarily, though promising he would stay with Julian forever. The other Council members are shown the boy and are overcome by emotion. Julian asks Theo to baptize him.

== Adaptation ==
In 2006, a film adaptation by Mexican director Alfonso Cuarón and starring Julianne Moore and Clive Owen was released. Cuarón used the premise as a jumping-off point to address contemporary issues such as the treatment of refugees. The film was well received. According to Cuarón, P. D. James said in a statement to Universal Pictures that she was proud to be associated with it despite its differences from the source material.

== Critical reception ==
On 5 November 2019 BBC News included The Children of Men on the BBC list of 100 'most inspiring' novels.

Critics praised the "powerful imagining" and world building of the scenario of human infertility.

== See also ==
- Pregnancy in science fiction
- Greybeard (1964) by Brian Aldiss, a science fiction novel where humanity had been sterilised by a weapon test in 1981 and is dying out in 2029
- The White Plague (1982) by Frank Herbert, a science fiction novel where bio-terrorism kills all women in three countries and threatens the rest of Earth
- The Handmaid's Tale (1985), a dystopia by Margaret Atwood where women's fertility was drastically reduced by pollution
