= Pierre Bergounioux =

French writer

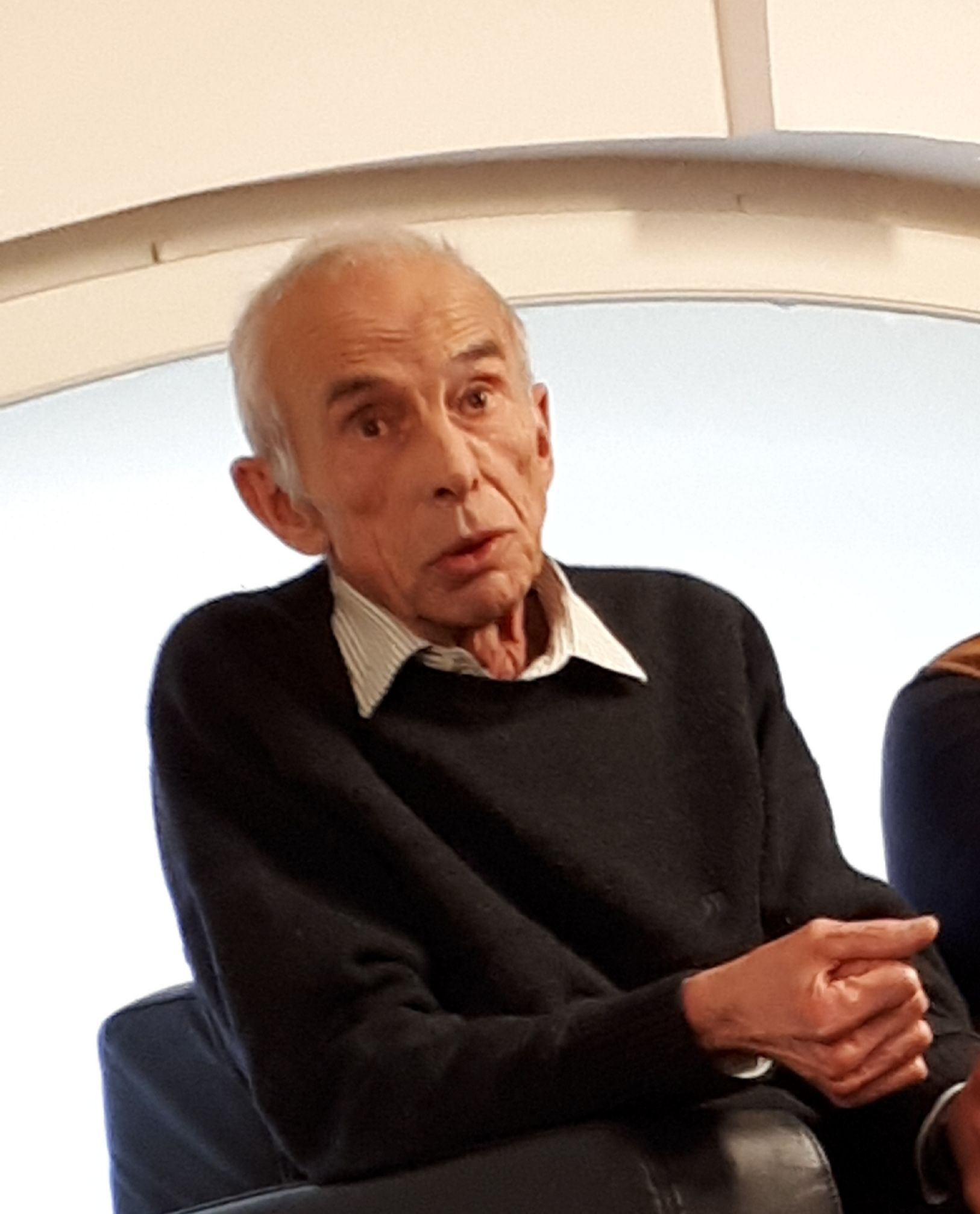
Pierre Bergougnioux

Pierre Bergounioux (born 1949 in Brive-la-Gaillarde, Corrèze) is a French writer. He won the 1986 Prix Alain-Fournier for his second novel, Ce pas et le suivant. And in 2002, he won the SGDL literary grand prize for his body of work.

== Works ==
- Catherine, Gallimard (1984)
- Ce pas et le suivant, Gallimard (1985)
- La bête faramineuse, Gallimard (1986)
- La maison rose, Gallimard (1987)
- L'arbre sur la rivière, Gallimard (1988)
- C'était nous, Gallimard (1989)
- Johan Zoffany, Vénus sur les eaux, with Bernadette de Boysson, éditions William Blake & Co. (1990)
- La mue, Gallimard (1991)
- L'orphelin, Gallimard (1992)
- Le matin des origines, Verdier (1992)
- Le Grand Sylvain, Verdier (1993)
- La Toussaint, Gallimard (1994)
- La casse, Fata Morgana (1994)
- Points cardinaux, Fata Morgana (1994)
- L'immémorable, with Magdi Senadji, éditions À une soie (1994)
- Au jour consumé, with Jean-Michel Fauquet, éditions Filigranes (1994)
- Miette, Gallimard (1995); Folio (1996)
- La cécité d'Homère. Cinq leçons de poétique, éditions Circé (1995)
- D'abord, nous sommes au monde, with Alain Turpault, éditions du Laquet (1995)
- Æneis, avec Philippe Ségéral, Fondation Paribas (1995)
- La mort de Brune, Gallimard (1996) et Folio (1997)
- Le chevron, Verdier (1996)
- Haute tension, éditions William Blake & Co. (1996)
- Le bois du chapitre, éditions Théodore Balmoral (1996)
- Les choses mêmes, with François Pons, éditions Les Cahiers de l'Atelier (1996)
- La ligne, Verdier (1997)
- L'empreinte, éditions François Janaud (1997); Fata Morgana (2007)
- La demeure des ombres, éditions Art & Arts (1997)
- Kpélié, Les Flohic éditeurs (1997)
- Conversations sur l'Isle, interviews with Tristan Hordé, éditions William Blake & Co. (1998)
- La puissance du souvenir dans l'écriture. L'effet Zeigarnik, éditions Pleins Feux (2000)
- Le premier mot, Gallimard (2001)
- Les forges de Syam, éditions de l'Imprimeur (2001); Verdier poche (2007)
- Simples, magistraux et autres antidotes, Verdier (2001)
- Un peu de bleu dans le paysage, Verdier (2001)
- B-17 G, Les Flohic éditeurs (2001), Argol (2006)
- François, éditions François Janaud (2001)
- Jusqu'à Faulkner, Gallimard (2002)
- Aimer la grammaire, Nathan (2002)
- L'héritage, interviews with Gabriel Bergounioux, Les Flohic éditeurs (2002)
- Ordalies, with Jean-Michel Fauquet, éditions Filigranes (2002)
- Back in the sixties, Verdier (2003)
- Univers préférables, Fata Morgana (2003)
- Bréviaire de littérature à l'usage des vivants, Bréal (2004)
- Le fleuve des âges, Fata Morgana (2005)
- Pycniques et leptosomes. Sur C.-A. Cingria, Fata Morgana (2005)
- Carnet de notes. Journal 1980-1990, Verdier (2006)
- L'invention du présent, Fata Morgana (2006)
- La fin du monde en avançant, Fata Morgana (2006)
- École : mission accomplie, éditions les Prairies ordinaires (2006)
- Où est le passé, interview with Michel Gribinski, Éditions de l'Olivier(2007)
- Carnet de notes. Journal 1991-2000, Verdier (2007)

English translations of Pierre Bergounioux:

Five of his novellas have been translated by Claude Neuman and published by Editions www.ressouvenances.fr: The Line (La ligne), Would-Be Hunter (Chasseur à la manque ) and Childishnesses (Enfantillages ) in 2022 under the collective title Of Fish and Game and Butterflies; B-17 G (B-17 G) together with The Witch’s Kiss (Le baiser de sorcière) in 2024.
