= The First Century after Beatrice =

1992 novel by Amin Maalouf

- First edition
- Author: Amin Maalouf
- Original title: Le Premier siècle après Béatrice
- Translator: Dorothy S. Blair
- Language: French
- Publisher: Grasset
- Publication date: 1992
- Publication place: France; Lebanon
- English publication date: 1993
- Pages: 189
- ISBN: 2253097829

The First Century after Beatrice (French: Le Premier siècle après Béatrice) is a 1992 novel by the French-Lebanese writer Amin Maalouf. The story is set in a near future, where a pharmacological company markets, in the guise of a traditional folk remedy, a drug by which parents can choose to only have sons. The story is told from the first-person point of view of an entomologist. As the disastrous consequences of the skewed male/female birth ratio resulting from the drug multiply, he transitions from pondering and documenting them to organizing a body of scientists who attempt to reckon with the disaster.

== Reception ==
John Tague of The Independent wrote: "Although Maalouf's image of the future is not a happy one, this parable never becomes portentous. His prose achieves an effortless lyricism which is always a pleasure to read - a reason, perhaps, for some little optimism in itself. If someone is going to tell a story about the end of the world, we can glean some comfort from the fact that it is told in a voice as refined and delightful as Amin Maalouf's."

== See also ==
- 1992 in literature
- Contemporary French literature
