= Amin Maalouf =

Lebanese-born French author (born 1949)

- أمين معلوف
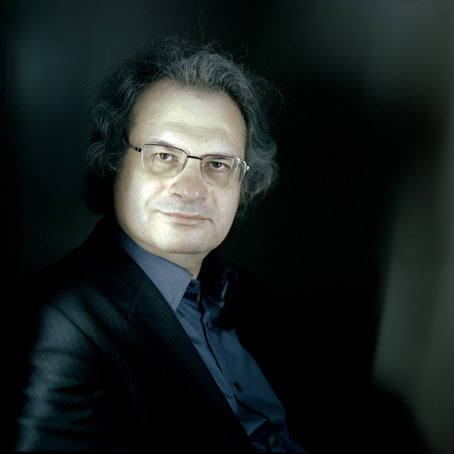
- Maalouf in 2016
- Born: 1949 (age 76–77); Beirut, Lebanon
- Occupations: Writer, scholar and novelist, Perpetual Secretary of the Académie Française (elected 28 September 2023)
- Writing career
- Language: French
- Notable works: Leo Africanus, The Rock of Tanios, The Crusades Through Arab Eyes, Samarkand

Amin Maalouf (French: [maluf]; Arabic: أمين رشدي بطرس طنّوص معلوف Arabic pronunciation: [maʕˈluːf]; born 1949) is a Lebanese French author who has lived in France since 1976. His native language is Arabic, and he writes in French. His works have been translated into more than 40 languages.

Of his several works of nonfiction, The Crusades Through Arab Eyes, is probably the best known. He received the Prix Goncourt in 1993 for his novel The Rock of Tanios, as well as the 2010 Prince of Asturias Award for Literature. He is a member of the Académie française and was elected its Perpetual Secretary on 28 September 2023.

== Biography ==
Maalouf was born in Beirut, Lebanon to Lebanese Christian parents, his both parents are originally from the Lebanese mountain village Ain el Kabou. He grew up in the Badaro cosmopolitan neighbourhood. He studied sociology and economics at the Saint Joseph University of Beirut.

He is the uncle of trumpeter Ibrahim Maalouf.

=== Career ===
Maalouf worked as the director of An-Nahar, a Beirut-based daily newspaper, until the start of the Lebanese civil war in 1975, when he moved to Paris, where he first became a journalist for an economic newspaper. Maalouf's first book, The Crusades Through Arab Eyes (1983), examines the period based on contemporaneous Arabic sources.

Along with his nonfiction work, he has written four texts for musical compositions and numerous novels.

His book Un fauteuil sur la Seine briefly recounts the lives of those who preceded him in seat #29 as a member of the Académie française.

== Awards ==
Maalouf has been awarded honorary doctorates by the Catholic University of Louvain (Belgium), the American University of Beirut (Lebanon), the Rovira i Virgili University (Spain), the University of Évora (Portugal), and the University of Ottawa (Canada).

In 1993, Maalouf was awarded the Prix Goncourt for his novel The Rock of Tanios (French: Le rocher de Tanios), set in 19th-century Lebanon. In 2004, the original, French edition of his Origins: A Memoir (Origines, 2004) won the Prix Méditerranée.

In 2010, he received the Spanish Prince of Asturias Award for Literature for his work, an intense mix of suggestive language, historic affairs in a Mediterranean mosaic of languages, cultures and religions and stories of tolerance and reconciliation. He was elected a member of the Académie française on 23 June 2011 to fill seat 29, left vacant by the death of anthropologist Claude Lévi-Strauss. Maalouf is the first person of Lebanese heritage to receive that honour.

In 2016, he won the Sheikh Zayed Book Award for "Cultural Personality of the Year", the premier category with a prize of 1 million dirhams (approx. US$272,000). In the same year, the University of Venice Ca' Foscari awarded him the Bauer-Incroci di civiltà prize for fostering cultural dialogue between civilizations.

In 2020, he was awarded the National Order of Merit by the French government. He was given the honour by President Emmanuel Macron.

In 2021, Maalouf was elected a Royal Society of Literature International Writer.

In 2025, Maalouf received the FIL Literary Award in Romance Languages during the Guadalajara International Book Fair.

== Honors and decorations ==
Ribbon bar	Country	Honour
	Finland	Knight First class of the Order of the Lion of Finland
	France	Officier of the Legion of Honour
Ordre national du Merite GO ribbon	France	Grand Officer of the National Order of Merit
	France	Commander of the Ordre des Arts et des Lettres
	Lebanon	Grand Cordon of the National Order of the Cedar
	Monaco	Commander of the Order of Cultural Merit

== Works ==
=== Fiction ===
Maalouf's novels are marked by his experiences of civil war and migration. Their characters are itinerant voyagers between lands, languages, and religions and he prefers to write about "our past".

Original		English translation	
1986	Léon l'Africain	1992	Leo Africanus, translated by Peter Sluglett. ISBN 1-56131-022-0
1988	Samarcande	1994	Samarkand, trans. Russell Harris. ISBN 1-56656-293-7.
1991	Les jardins de lumière	1996	The Gardens of Light, trans. Dorothy S. Blair. ISBN 1-56656-248-1.
1992	Le Premier siècle après Béatrice	1993	The First Century after Beatrice, trans. Dorothy S. Blair. ISBN 0-7043-7051-4.
1993	Le Rocher de Tanios	1994	The Rock of Tanios, trans. Dorothy S. Blair ISBN 0-8076-1365-7.
1996	Les Échelles du Levant	1996	Ports of Call, trans. Alberto Manguel. ISBN 1-86046-890-X.
2000	Le Périple de Baldassare	2002	Balthasar's Odyssey, trans. Barbara Bray. ISBN 1-55970-702-X.
2012	Les Désorientés	2020	The Disoriented, trans. Frank Wynne. ISBN 978-1-64286-058-0.
2020	Nos frères inattendus	2023	On the Isle of Antioch, trans. Natasha Lehrer. ISBN 978-1-64286-134-1.

=== Non-fiction ===
Original		English translation	
1983	Les Croisades vues par les Arabes	1986	The Crusades Through Arab Eyes. ISBN 0-8052-0898-4
1998	Les Identités meurtrières	2000	In the Name of Identity: Violence and the Need to Belong, translated by Barbara Bray. ISBN 0-14-200257-7.
2004	Origines	2008.	Origins: A Memoir, translated by Catherine Temerson. ISBN 978-0-374-22732-6.
2009	Le Dérèglement du monde	2011	Disordered World: Setting a New Course for the Twenty-First Century, translated by George Miller. ISBN 978-1-60819-584-8
2019	Le Naufrage des civilisations	2020	Adrift: How Our World Lost Its Way, translated by Frank Wynne. ISBN 978-1-64286-075-7
2023	Le Labyrinthe des égarés. L’Occident et ses adversaires	-	ISBN 9782246830436

=== Librettos ===
All Maalouf's librettos have been written for the Finnish composer Kaija Saariaho.

- 2000. L'Amour de loin ('Love from Afar'), opera
- 2003. Adriana Mater, opera
- 2006. La Passion de Simone, oratorio
- 2010. Émilie, monodrama
