= Social class in France =

The modern social structure of France is complex, but generally similar to that of other European countries. Traditional social classes still have some presence, with a large bourgeoisie and especially petite bourgeoisie, and an unusually large proportion, for modern Europe, of farming smallholders. All these groups, and the remaining industrial working class, have considerable political power, which they are able to flex when required.

== History ==
=== Ancien Régime ===
The "Old Regime" French society before the French Revolution was divided on the principle of the estates of the realm and they were as follows:

1. Clergy
2. Nobility
3. Common people

=== Following the Industrial Revolution ===
Following industrialization and the French Revolution altered the social structure of France and the bourgeoisie became the new ruling class. The feudal nobility was on the decline with agricultural and land yields decreasing, and arranged marriages between noble and bourgeois family became increasingly common, fusing the two social classes together during the 19th century.

The social classes in France during this period were as follows:

1. The haute bourgeoisie: Highly educated and affluent, this social class had both economic and political sway, and could afford leisure time. This class was composed of industrialists, lawyers, bankers, notaries, politicians, prominent doctors and pharmacists.
2. The petite bourgeoisie: An educated or skilled middle class. They are composed of store owners, lower ranked civil servants, professors, and skilled artisans.
3. The cadres: These were generally office/clerical workers and nowadays would include lower-skilled IT jobs. They could also include some supervisory roles over fellow employees in working class workplaces. In France they have been traditionally treated as a social class unto themselves, whereas in English-speaking countries they are generally treated as the lowest edge of the middle class as, although they perform largely unskilled work, their jobs do have a loosely white collar veneer.
4. The working class: This formed the majority of the population. The urban working class is distinguished from the rural laborers. With industrialization on the rise, there is an increasing about of jobs in urban areas based in factories and construction sites. The countryside is on the decline and a large amount of rural laborers move towards cities and towns for better opportunities. Low cultural and education outlook.

=== Contemporary France ===
In the 21st century, social class in France is often measured by income and profession. Bon chic bon genre (BCBG) is a term for fashionable people of good family ("bon genre"), especially in Paris. Graduates of the École nationale d'administration, or énarques predominate in the upper levels of government and many industries, along with graduates of the other Grandes écoles, specialized state-run institutes of tertiary education. However, primary and secondary education is almost entirely at state schools, unlike say England, and is a major engine of social mobility. Cultural capital, a concept from France, is still considered an issue for the many French people in a process of social mobility.
