= Gabriel Méxène =

Philosophical poet, painter and engraver

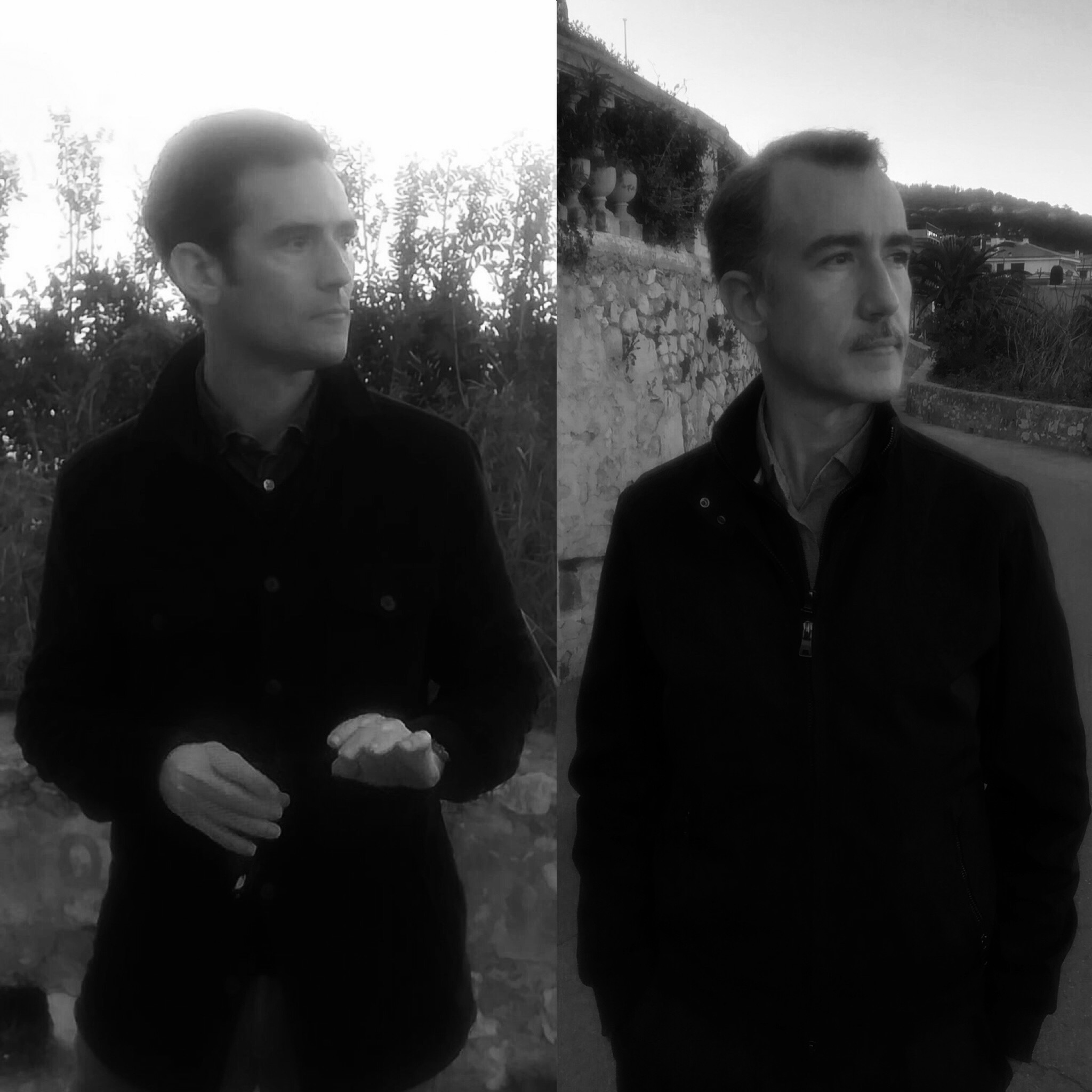
- Damien and Vincent Fayolle, Promenade Rouvier, 2019
- Occupations: Philosophical poet, painter and engraver

Gabriel Méxène is the collective pseudonym of French brothers Vincent Fayolle (born 1969) and Damien Fayolle (born 1974). Philosophical poet, his work comprised poetry, painting and engraving.

== Biography ==
His work The Figures consists of several books. Each book (paper, or digital, or marble) combines text and landscapes. The whole is an initiatory narrative elaborating the contemporary image of the sorcerer. Gabriel Méxène was born one summer evening along the ramparts of the Citadel of Villefranche-sur-Mer. During this night of perfect ecstasy, the two brothers conceived a vast and altruistic utopia where poetic narrative, philosophy and painting are united. This utopia, known as "Piedmont-Savoy" is rooted in the history and geography of the Metropolis of Nice. In love with Nice, the author methodically develops his work in the metropolis which becomes his magical and cultural territory.

== Art edition ==
Artist's books:

- Les Figures, Livre Iota Paris, Les Larmes d'Icare - Philosophie & Merveilleux, 2005
- Les Figures, Livre Xi Paris, Les Larmes d'Icare - Philosophie & Merveilleux, 2006
- Les Figures, Livre Sigma Paris, Les Larmes d'Icare Philosophie & Merveilleux, 2009

== Public collections ==
- Bibliothèque municipale de Lyon
- Bibliothèque littéraire Jacques-Doucet, Paris
- Bibliothèque Patrimoniale Romain Gary Nice (Pages Orques, Livre Tau)
- Collections de la Mairie de Villefranche-sur-Mer (Livre Delta)

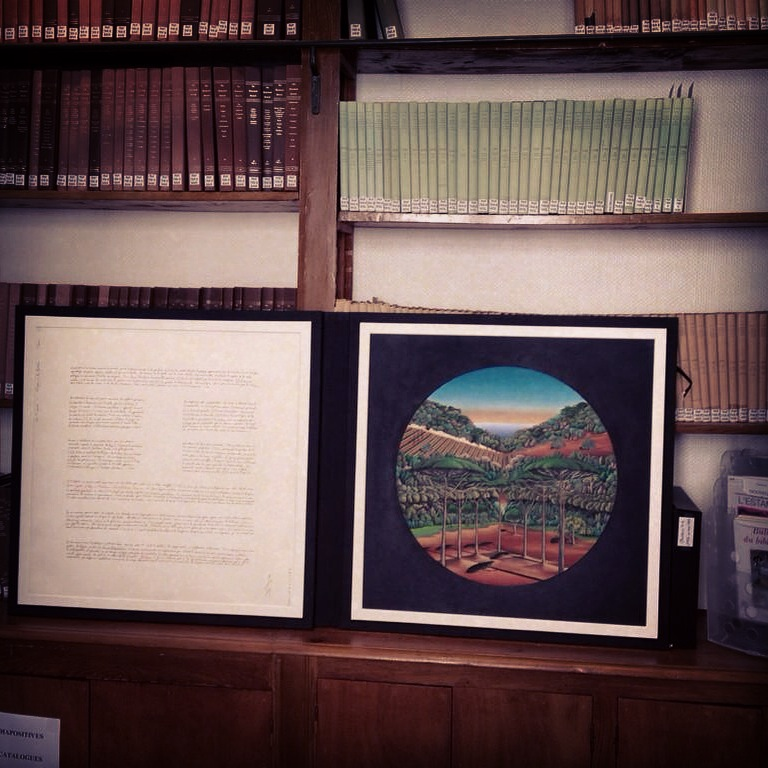
The Figures, Orc page, Collections of the Library of Nice.

== Stone books ==
- Les Figures, Livre Delta, 2015 (Eight engraved, gilded and painted stones) Musées de la Citadelle de Villefranche-sur-Mer. The Delta Book, known as the "Dragon Book of Piedmont-Savoy", contains 1400 Roman capital letters engraved by hand on Tavel marble. The hours of an ideal day take place according to 6 landscapes. The book elaborates a relation to the sacred by recreating a link with polytheism. It conceptualizes a thought of alterity therefore of memory.

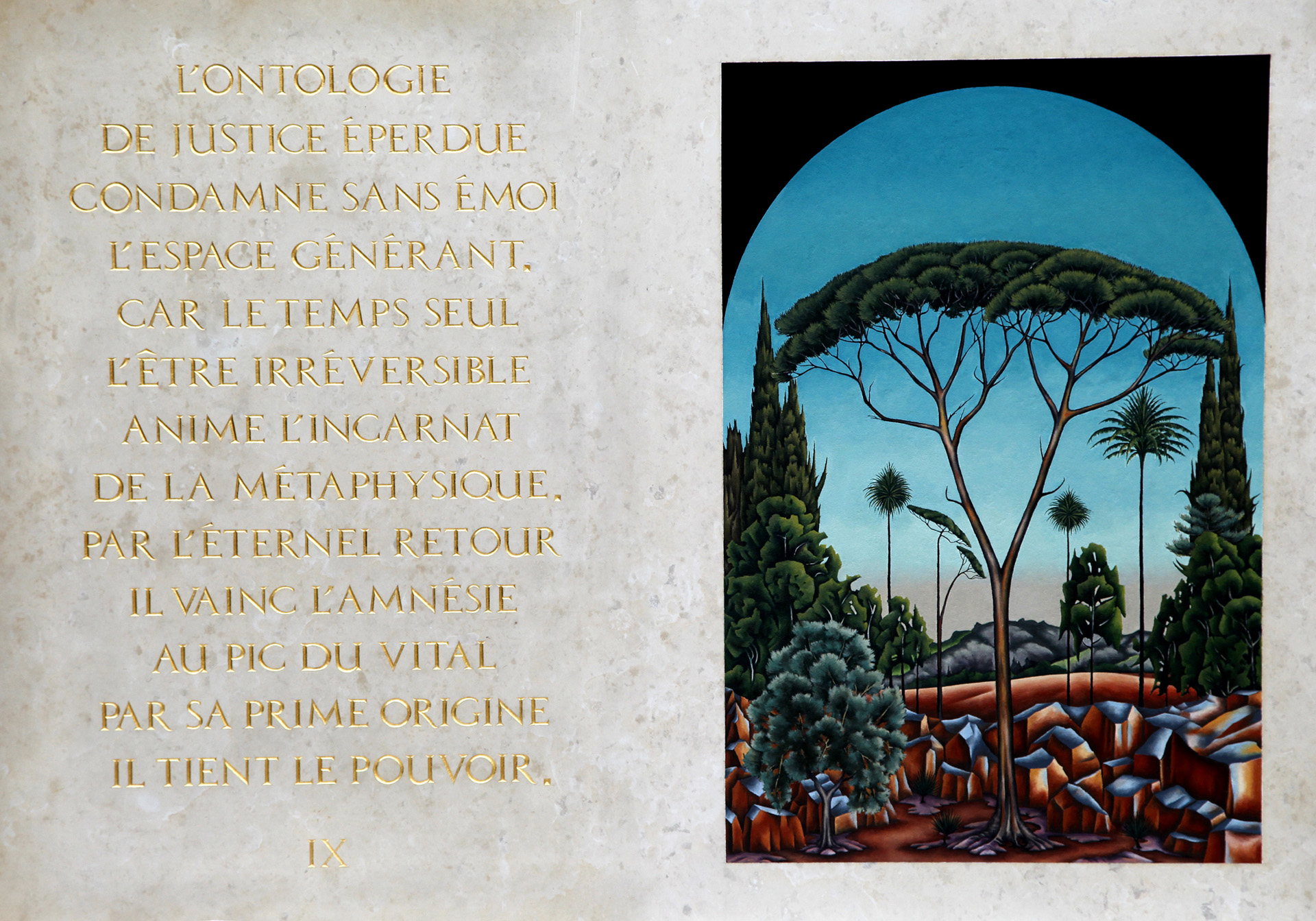
The Figures, Delta Book, pages 9/10. Collections of the citadel museums in Villefranche-sur-Mer.

- Les Figures, Livre Tau, 2019 (Six engraved and painted stones) on permanent exhibition at the Romain Gary Library of Nice. The Tau Book, known as the "Temple Book of Piedmont-Savoy", contains 800 Roman capital letters engraved by hand on Tavel marble. The Tau Book is installed at the four pillars of the reading room of the Nice Heritage Library. It celebrates Mediterranean culture and major metaphysical aspirations. This book conceptualizes the "library" as a temple built according to the Etruscan rite.

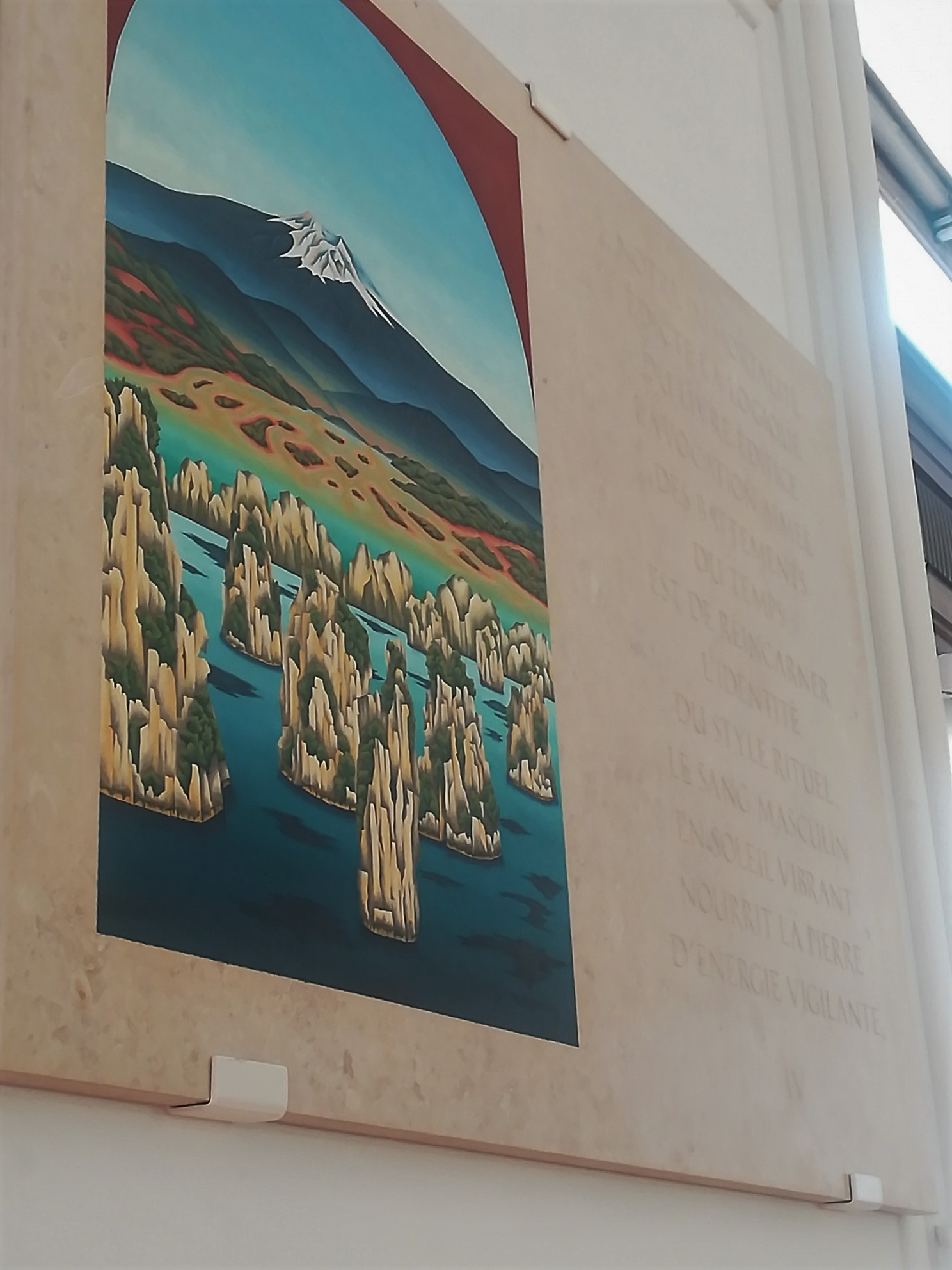
The Figures, Tau Book, pages 3/4 on permanent exhibition at the Romain Gary Library of Nice.

== Digital edition ==
- Les Figures, Livre Iota - Les Larmes d'Icare Philosophie & Merveilleux, 2012
- Les Figures, Livre Xi - Les Larmes d'Icare Philosophie & Merveilleux, 2012
- Les Figures, Livre Sigma - Les Larmes d'Icare Philosophie & Merveilleux, 2013
- Les Figures, Livre Phi - Les Larmes d'Icare Philosophie & Merveilleux, 2017
