= Freeforall =

1986 short story by Margaret Atwood

"Freeforall" is a 1986 dystopian short story by Margaret Atwood, often described as a gender flipped version of her novel The Handmaid's Tale.

== Background ==
Atwood envisioned "Freeforall" as a companion piece to The Handmaid's Tale, published a year prior. Like The Handmaid's Tale, "Freeforall" is set in a dystopian society. Atwood intended this dystopia to evoke responses to the then-widespread AIDS epidemic: "The solution that society has come up with is that you would have to have arranged marriages, and you would have to have sexually pure participants, otherwise everyone would just die."

"Freeforall" was first published on Sept 20, 1986 in the Toronto Star's Life section, as part of a series called "The Family Into 2001." A year later, the story ran in the Canadian anthology series Tesseracts.

Atwood originally intended "Freeforall" to appear in her 1994 collection Good Bones and Simple Murders but ultimately decided it did not fit the theme. At her editors' request, she included a new version of "Freeforall," abridged and slightly rewritten, in a 2023 anthology of stories Old Babes in the Wood.

== Summary ==
The story is set in the year 2026, a time of widespread and rampant sexually transmitted diseases in Toronto, Ontario, Canada. Society is extremely limited, with freedoms tightly regulated by a totalitarian state in the name of saving society from these illnesses.

The world's population is tightly segregated with the infected living somewhere on the "outside," presumably in deplorable conditions and left to their own devices. These "freeforalls," areas of sexual freedom, are tacitly encouraged, with the intent that the presumed anarchy and privation will lead to the natural elimination of disease when all the human carriers are dead. The infected are condemned and are left to perish, with no assistance offered from the "inside". Moral value has been placed on disease with the infected being treated as having brought the trouble onto themselves.

Minimal detail is supplied about the "outside" world, and it is referred to only indirectly and reflected in the fears of the healthy inside population. This presumably healthy population lives under extreme duress, and gender roles appear to be breaking down. A group of "Mothers" has arranged young girls and boys to be married off and to live celibate lives, using a "turkey baster" rather than sexual intercourse to procreate.

== Publication history ==
- The Toronto Star (1986)
- Tesseracts (1987)
- Northern Suns: The New Anthology of Canadian Science Fiction (1999)
- Old Babes in the Wood (2023)
