= Adrift: How Our World Lost Its Way =

2019 book by Amin Maalouf

- Author: Amin Maalouf
- Original title: Le Naufrage des civilisations
- Translator: Frank Wynne
- Language: French
- Publisher: Éditions Grasset
- Publication date: 13 March 2019
- Publication place: France
- English publication date: 1 September 2020
- Pages: 336
- ISBN: 9782246852179

Adrift: How Our World Lost Its Way (French: Le Naufrage des civilisations) is a 2019 book by the French-Lebanese writer Amin Maalouf. It is a personal analysis of post-war international politics, covering geopolitics relating to the Middle East, increased social fragmentisation in Europe and changing political credibility in the United States. Maalouf names 1979 as a key year due to the Iranian Revolution and the election of Margaret Thatcher.
