= List of Gabonese people =

This article contains a list of notable Gabonese people, in order by profession, followed by alphabetical order by last name. To be included in this list, the person must have a Wikipedia article.

== Actors, musicians, and entertainers ==
- Créol (born 1989), singer and songwriter
- Ludacris (born 1977), also known as Christopher Brian Bridges, American rapper, with Gabonese citizenship
- Samuel L. Jackson (born 1948), American actor, with Gabonese citizenship
- Philippe Mory (1935–2016), actor, film director
- Pauline Mvele (born 1969), Burkinabé-born actress, living in Gabon
- Vicky R (born 1996), rapper
- Shan'L (born 1989), singer and songwriter
- Oliver N'Goma (born 1959), singer and guitarist

== Politicians, activists, and political leaders ==
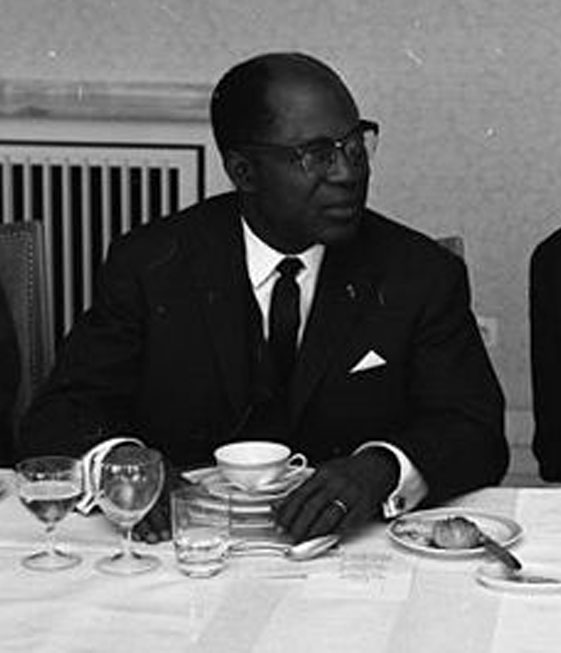
Jean-Hilaire Aubame (1912–1989)

- Mathurin Anghiley (1886–1949), politician who was elected to the French Senate
- Anguilè Ré-Dowé (?–1867), 19th cen. Mpongwe village leader of Agekaza-Quaben
- Jean-Hilaire Aubame (1912–1989), politician active during both the colonial and independence periods
- Marie-Augustine Houangni Ambouroué, first woman to be mayor of Port-Gentil, Gabon, the country's second largest city
- Ida Reteno Assonouet, politician
- Liliane Massala (born 1964), diplomat
- Lee White (born 1965), British conservationist, politician in Gabon
- Laurence Ndong, politician
- Félicité Ongouori Ngoubili, politician

== Sports people, and athletes ==
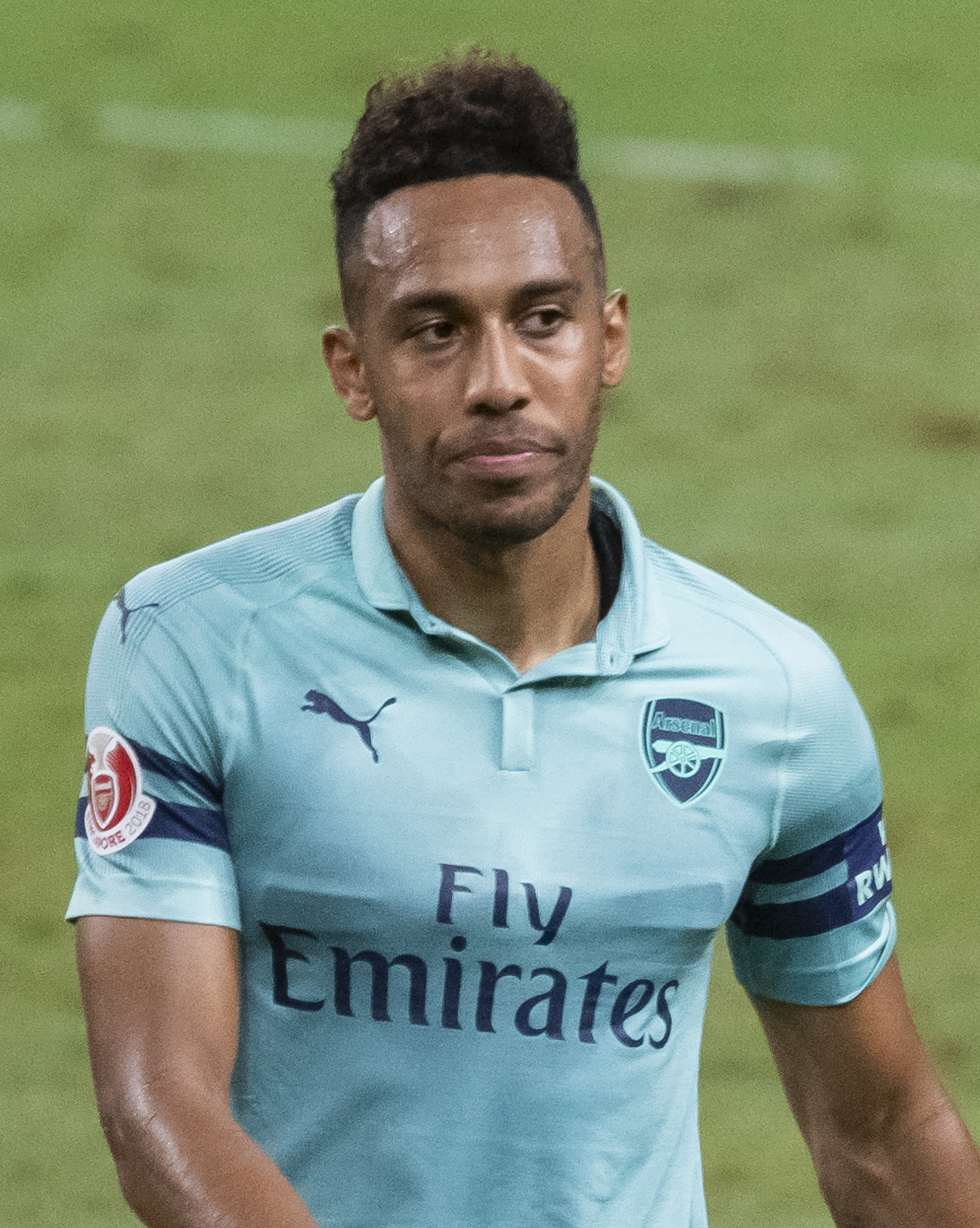
Pierre–Emerick Aubameyang (born 1989)

- Pierre Atcho (born 1992), FIFA football referee
- Pierre-Emerick Aubameyang (born 1989), French-born footballer, who captains the Gabon national team
- Wilfried Bingangoye (born 1985), former olympic sprinter
- Antoine Boussombo (born 1968), former olympic sprinter
- Odette Mistoul (born 1959), former olympic track and field athlete
- Marlyse Nsourou (born 1987), former Olympic runner
- Noélie Annette Lacour (born 2006), swimmer

== Visual artist, and designers ==
- Myriam Mihindou (born 1964), French contemporary artist, of Gabonese and French heritage
- Boris Nzebo (born 1979), painter, of Gabonese heritage living in Cameroon
- Owanto (born 1953), also known as Owanto Berger, French-born British and Gabonese multidisciplinary artist
- Aïda Touré, painter, Sufi poet, of Gabonese and Malian heritage

== Writers, and journalists ==
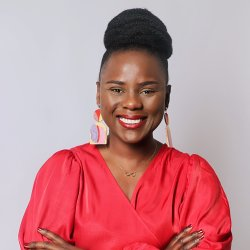
Nadia Origo (born 1977)

- Pulchérie Abeme Nkoghe (born 1980), poet, children's book author
- Jean-Baptiste Abessolo (born 1932), writer, educator
- Nadège Noële Ango-Obiang (born 1973), writer
- Peggy Lucie Auleley (born 1971), poet, novelist
- Bessora (born 1968), Belgium-born novelist and short story writer, of Gabonese heritage
- Charline Effah (born 1977) Gabonese novelist and educator, living in Paris
- Chantal Magalie Mbazo'o-Kassa (born 1967), poet and novelist
- Edna Merey-Apinda (born 1976), writer
- Justine Mintsa (born 1949), Gabonese Fang writer
- Patrick N'Guema N'Dong (1957–2021), radio journalist
- Honorine Ngou (born 1957), writer and academic
- Vincent de Paul Nyonda (1918–1995), playwright and minister
- Nadia Origo (born 1977), French-born Gabonese writer and editor
- Angèle Rawiri (1954–2010), Gabonese writer, who lived in Paris
- André Raponda Walker (1871–1968), Gabonese writer, ethnographer, Catholic priest, and missionary of Mpongwe and British descent

== Others ==
- Samantha Biffot (born 1985) French-born film producer, film director, and screenwriter; living in Gabon
