= Lycée Blaise Pascal =

Lycée Blaise Pascal or Lycée Français Blaise Pascal (LFBP) may refer to:

- Lycée Français Blaise Pascal Abidjan - Abidjan, Ivory Coast
- Lycée Blaise Pascal de Libreville - Libreville, Gabon
- The high school division of the École Pascal (FR) in Paris
- Lycée Blaise-Pascal (Orsay)
- Lycée Blaise-Pascal (Charbonnières-les-Bains)
- Lycée Blaise-Pascal (Châteauroux)
- Lycée Blaise-Pascal (FR) (Clermont-Ferrand)
- Lycée Blaise-Pascal (Colmar)
- Lycée Blaise-Pascal (Brie-Comte-Robert)
- Lycée Blaise-Pascal (Rouen)
- Lycée Blaise-Pascal (Longuenesse)
