= Joëlle Esso =

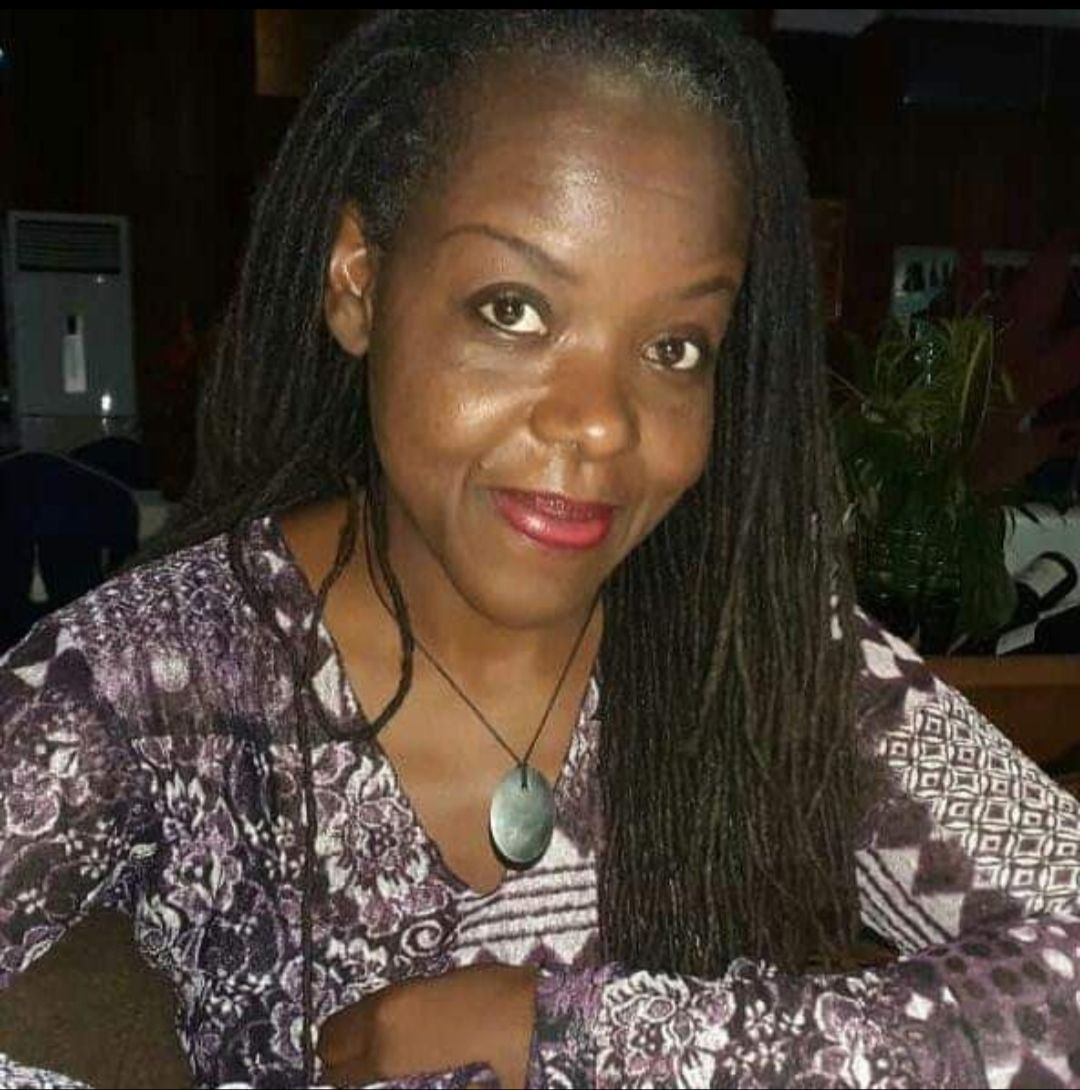
- Born: 17 January 1968; Douala
- Other names: Jeki
- Citizenship: Cameroonian
- Occupation(s): Actress, singer, illustrator

Joëlle Esso also known by the name Jeki Esso, born on 17 January 1968 in Douala, is a comic book author and a francophone Cameroonian illustrator. She is also a painter, comedian, dancer, singer and songwriter.

== Biography ==
=== Early life ===
Joëlle Esso grew up in Cameroon and spent her adolescence in Ivory Coast. She then moved to Paris, France, where she trained in graphic arts and followed a course in art history.

=== Career ===
She began her career as an illustrator and studio vocalist in 1988.

In 2005, she recorded her first album titled Mungo!, a traditional Cameroonian blend of blues and gospel. The same year, she produced the soundtrack for the film The Bloodettes by Jean-Pierre Bekolo nominated for the César Awards for Best French-language Film on January 15, 2010. As a vocalist, she accompanies several artists in concert such as Carole Fredericks et Yannick Noah.

She joined the Editions Monde Global team where she illustrated children's books from 2006 to 2008, including Tiwa et la Pierre-Miroir by Serge Bilé and Joby Bernabé, as well as the collective work Slamophonie. She also collaborates with the writer and editor Nadia Origo, for whom she illustrated two books in 2009.

In 2010, she released her first comic book titled Petit Joss, école urbaine mixte published by Dagan. She is the director of the Akanga Cultural Center, a Pan-African Cultural Center established in 2016 in Porto-Novo, Benin.

== Bibliography ==
=== As an illustrator ===
- Tiwa et la pierre miroir, by Serge Bilé and Joby Bernabé, book-cd, Monde Global, 2006.
- Slamophonie, collection, Sepia, 2009.
- Le royaume de Longo, by Nadia Origo, La Doxa, 2009.
- Histoires des personnages de la Bible : règnes, pouvoirs et royautés, by Nadia Origo, La Doxa, 2009.
- Le Monument aux Morts, Karim da Silva, Dagan, 2021.
- Quatre Héroïnes de l'Histoire Africaine, collection, Dagan, 2021

=== Author and illustrator ===
- Petit Joss, école urbaine mixte, BD, Dagan, 2010.
- Hanibal@Pushkin, book-CD-DVD, Dagan, 2011.
- Eto'o Fils T1 Naissance d'un champion, with Samuel Eto'o Fils, BD, Dagan, 2012.
- Eto'o Fils T2 L'Envol, with Samuel Eto'o Fils, BD, Dagan, 2014
- Une Maison dans le désert, album, Dagan, 2023
- Tranches de Vies, collection, BD, Dagan, 2021.

== Discography ==
- 2005 : Mungo !

== See also ==
- Literature of Cameroon
