= Patrick N'Guema N'Dong =

Franco-Gabonese journalist (1957–2021)

- Born: 1 January 1957; Royat
- Died: 23 December 2021 (aged 64)
- Occupations: Journalist, Radio personality, Writer, Television director

Patrick N'Guema N'Dong (1957 – 23 December 2021) was a French-Gabonese journalist on Gabon's Africa N°1 radio station, which is transmitted through French Africa and France. He was known for his two programs devoted to the occult sciences, parapsychology, and traditional African religions.

== Early life and education ==
N'Dong was born in Royat, France in 1957. His mother was French and his father Gabonese. He attended high school at the Lycée Léon M'Ba à Libreville (the Léon M'Ba Lycée at Libreville). He received a degree in Letters at the Academy of Clermont-Ferrand and an English licentiate from Omar Bongo University in 1978, after which he attended the University of Indiana, where he received a Master of Comparative Literature in 1982. It was during this time in the United States that he became interested in parapsychology.

== Radio career ==
N'Dong hosted "Triangle" with Bruce Walker Mapoma, a program which tackles various subjects related to the occult sciences, and answers questions from listeners.

N'Dong also hosted "L’Aventure mystérieuse" ("The mysterious adventure") (every Sunday starting at 9:10 PM Paris time) which has been in production for nearly 20 years. The program presents fictional stories in which mystery plays a great part, with some recurring characters, such as the wizard Fifian Ribana, the general Mangani Mangwa, or the professor Eubénézer Euthanazief, and often in the imaginary city of Bangos.

== Writing ==
His book Rêves de serpent (Snake Dreams) is divided into two parts. In the first part, N'Dong interprets twenty dreams, all involving snakes, and explains the significance of snakes in African mysticism. In the second part, the appearance of snakes in literature and other traditions is described, with pieces written by guest authors.

== Personal life and death ==
N'Dong died on 23 December 2021, at the age of 64.
