= Owanto =

British Gabonese artist

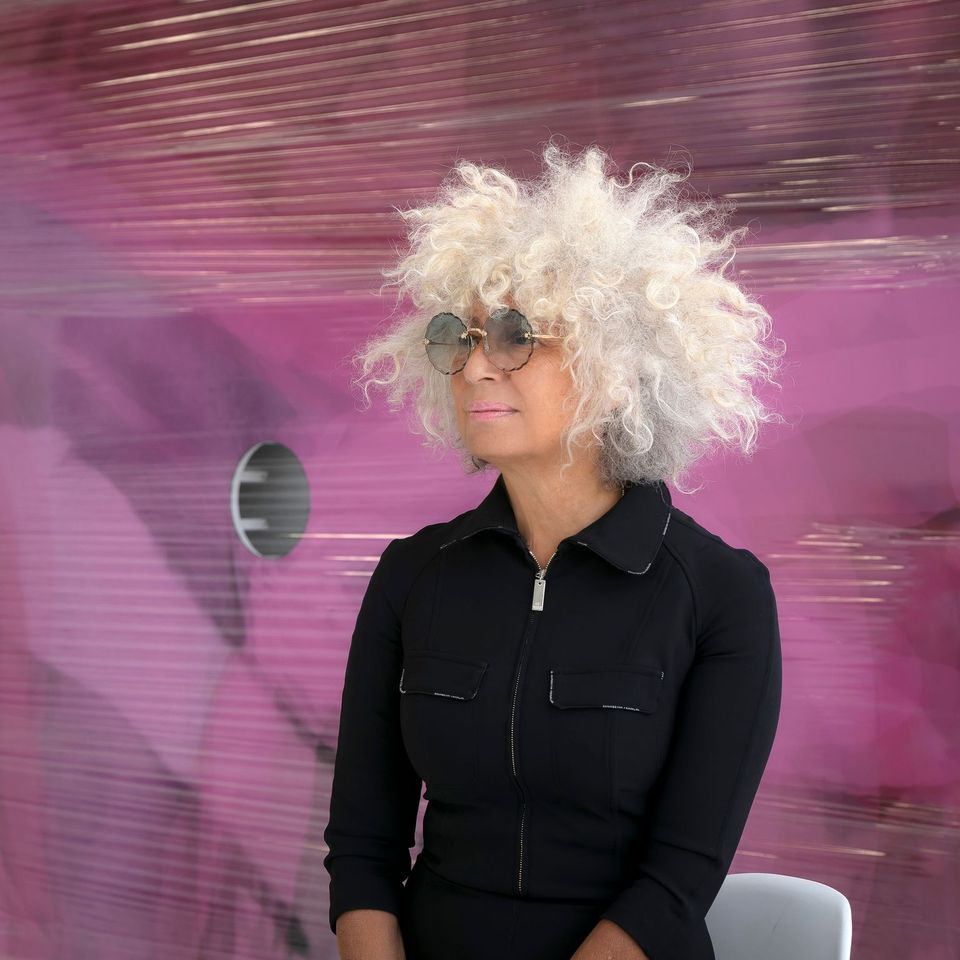
- Owanto
- Born: 13 December 1953 (age 72); Paris, France
- Occupations: Exhibition artist, Activist
- Years active: 2009-present
- Known for: Art exhibitions, Feminist activism

Owanto (born 13 December 1953 in Paris) is a British Gabonese artist.

== Biography ==
Owanto was born on 13 December 1953 in Paris, and spent her adolescence in Libreville, Gabon, where she spent her formative years, later moving to Madrid and studying at the Institut Catholic de Paris

In 2009, Owanto represented the Republic of Gabon at the 53rd Venice Biennale with her piece The Lighthouse of Memory/ Go Nogé Mènè, curated by Fernando Francès, being the first Central African artist to exhibit solo in a National Pavilion. Owanto stated that the piece was inspired by an artistic proposal she called “Où Allons Nous?” (Where Are We Going?). Owanto also states that; "Gabon was looking for new directions, as was the rest of the world - new systems, new models of society, new ways of seeing.”

== Work ==
Owanto's work has focused on many themes, including consciousness, memory, cross-cultural existential dialogues, among others. Owanto's current projects focus on women's liberation, resilience, healing, and transformation.

Owanto's art has entered into pop, conceptual and minimal genres in both her statuary work and others

== Accolades ==
Owanto won the Mbokodo Award in 2020. “The awards honor women who have strengthened communities and individuals through their art.”

== Exhibitions ==
2009: “The Lighthouse of Memory/ Go Nogé Mènè” Venice Biennale, Venice, Italy

2011: "El Faro de la Memoria" Galería Maior, Vigo, Spain

2012: "Où Allons Nous?" Voice Gallery, Marrakech, Morocco

2013: "Protect" Jardins de Saint Martin, Monaco

2014: "Here, Now." Biennale de Marrakech, Marrakech, Morocco

2015: Owanto " L'Atelier de l'artiste" Art Marbella, Galeria Yusto-Giner, Marbella, Spain

2016: "Flowers" Conseil National, Monaco

2018: "Dance with Me" African Artists Foundation, Lagos, Nigeria

2018: "Flowers" Voice Gallery, Marrakech, Morocco

2019: "One Thousand Voices" Museo d'Arte Contemporanea Donnaregina (MADRE), Naples, Italy

2019: "One Thousand Voices" Zeitz Museum of Contemporary Art Africa (Z-MOCAA), Cape Town, South Africa

2020: "Flowers" Sakhile&Me, Frankfurt, Germany

2020: "La Bible de ma Mère" LagosPhoto20, Online Home Museum

=== Group Exhibits ===
2016: "Made in Spain. Periplo por el arte español de hoy" MAD Antequera, Málaga, Spain

2016: "Beauty" Centro de Exposiciones de Benalmádena, Benalmádena, Spain; MAD Antequera, Málaga, Spain

2016: "Group Presentation" 1:54 Contemporary African Art Fair London (Voice Gallery), London, UK

2017: "All Things Being Equal..." Zeitz Museum of Contemporary Art Africa (Z-MOCAA), Cape Town, South Africa

2017: "Group Presentation" 1:54 Contemporary African Art Fair London (Voice Gallery), London, UK

2017: "Group Presentation" Also Known As Africa Art Fair (AKAAAF), Paris, France

2017: "Group Presentation" LagosPhoto, Lagos, Nigeria

2018: "Group Presentation" 1:54 Contemporary African Art Fair London (Voice Gallery), London, UK

2018: "Our Anthropocene: Eco Crises" The Center for Book Arts, New York City, USA

2019: "Material Insanity" Museum of African Contemporary Art Al Maaden (MACAAL), Marrakech, Morocco

2020: "Group Show" 1-54 Contemporary African Art Fair (Sakhile&Me), London, UK

== In Popular Culture ==
In the season 11 episode of It's Always Sunny in Philadelphia, "Dee makes a smut film", Danny DeVito's character Frank pretends to be an art critic, and dresses in a style inspired by Owanto, dubbing himself "Ongo Gablogian".
