= Pauline Mvele =

Actress, director and screenwriter from Burkina Faso

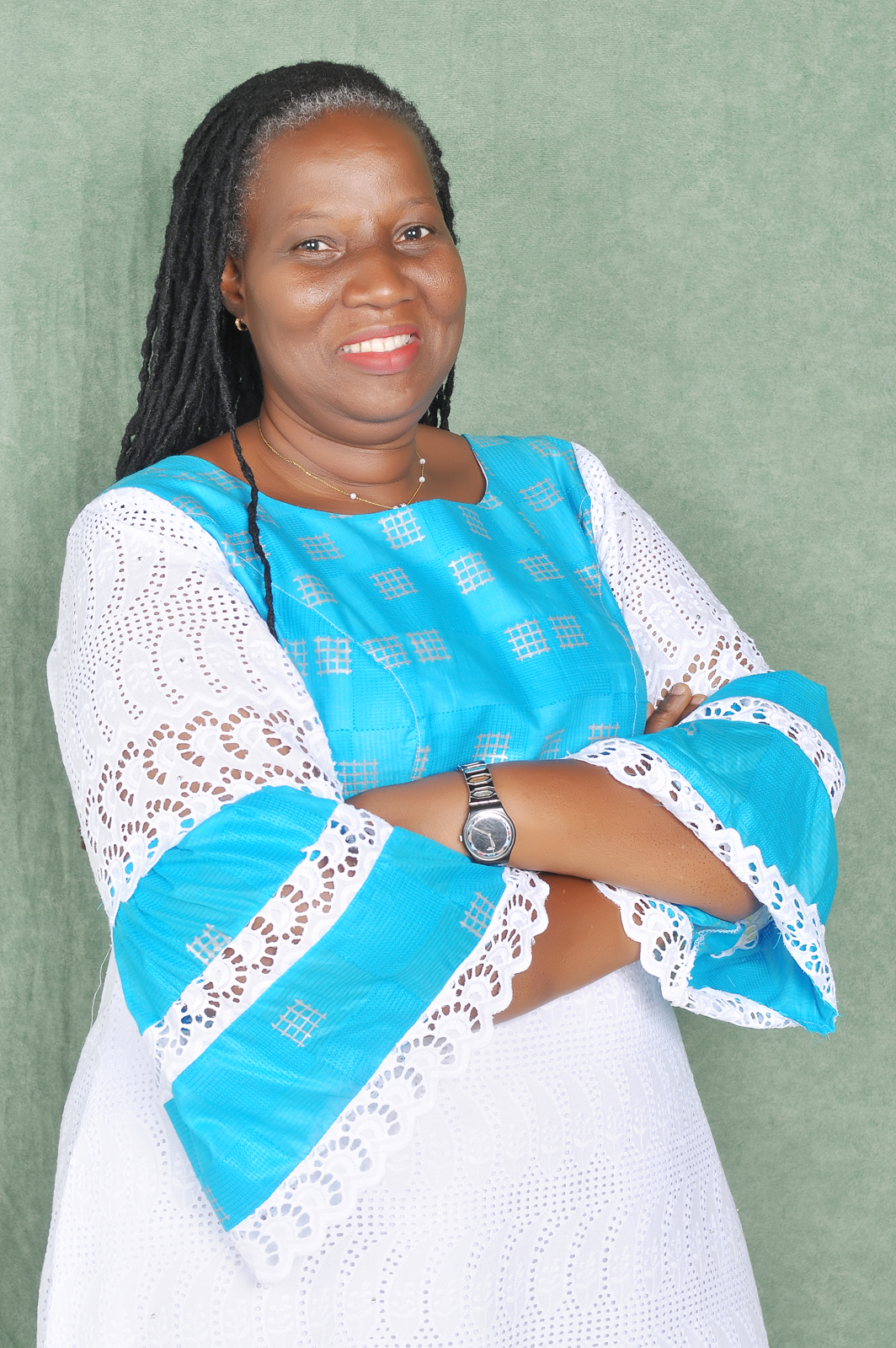
- Born: 1969 (age 56–57); Ivory Coast
- Citizenship: Burkinabé
- Education: Joseph Ki-Zerbo University
- Occupations: Actress, director, screenwriter, activist
- Notable work: Sans famille

Pauline Mvele (born 1969) is an actress, director and screenwriter from Burkina Faso. Mvele is known for producing documentaries, and currently lives in Gabon. Her documentaries focus on issues such as HIV/AIDS in Africa, and the mistreatment of widows and prisoners in Gabon. Her 2014 film Sans famille won best film at the Burundi Film Festival.

== Biography ==
Pauline Mvele was born in Ivory Coast in 1969, and was raised in Burkina Faso. She studied at Joseph Ki-Zerbo University in Ouagadougou, where she met her husband, and in 1999 she graduated with a master's degree in journalism. After graduating, Mvele moved to Gabon with her husband, who is Gabonese. While in Gabon, she faced difficulty finding work and had to take up odd jobs, before eventually finding a job in journalism writing for the women's magazine Amina. Mvele became involved in HIV/AIDS prevention organizations. She was inspired to begin her activism and filmmaking after writing an article about the difficulties faced by HIV-positive women in Gabon, and seeing the positive response the article received.

In 2009, Mvele directed Accroche-toi! (English: Hold On!), her first documentary film. Accroche-toi! explored the lives of five women living with HIV in Gabon, with the aim of reducing the stigma against HIV positive individuals and encouraging HIV-positive individuals to not give up on life. She produced the film in collaboration with Gabonese director Imunga Ivanga, and the film was produced and funded by the Gabonese Institute of Image and Sound.

In 2011, Mvele directed Non coupables (English: Not guilty!), a documentary that denounces the abuse of Gabonese widows by the families of their deceased husbands, especially the practice of robbing the widows of their possessions. In 2014, she directed the documentary Sans famille (English: Without Family), which detailed the mistreatment and poor living conditions of prisoners in the Libreville Detention Center.

As of 2017, Mvele was working on a new documentary, titled Le Nganga blanc, which follows the life of Hugues Obiang Poitevin, a Frenchman who has lived in Gabon for forty years, becoming immersed in Gabonese culture, particularly Bwiti. The documentary pitch won first prize for Best Concept from the Panafrican Film and Television Festival of Ouagadougou.

Mvele co-organized the Third Urusaro International Women's Film Festival in March 2018. In October 2019, she was a member of the East African Jury at the Urusaro International Women's Film Festival. In November 2019, it was announced that Mvele would be presenting a new film project at the first Yaoundé Film Lab in Cameroon from November to December 2019.

== Activism and other work ==
Mvele's work focuses on social problems facing Gabon, such as the AIDS crisis, the poor treatment of prisoners, and the abuse of widowed women by their in-laws. Themes of prejudice and ostracization are central to many of her works, and she frequently advocates for greater understanding and improved treatment of marginalized groups. Mvele is the founder and president of the Gabonese association against HIV/AIDS Hope for Children, which raises awareness and seeks to prevent the transmission of AIDS. The association promotes the Abstinence, be faithful, use a condom model of sex education.

== Filmography ==
Films featuring Mvele
Year	Title	Actor	Director
2015	Télésourd	Yes	No
2014	Vivre avec le cancer	No	Yes
2014	Sans famille	No	Yes
2014	The Best	No	Yes
2009	Accroche-toi!	No	Yes
2011	Non coupables	No	Yes
1989	Le Choix de Chantal	Yes	No

== Awards ==
List of awards and nominations, showing award, year and association
Year	Work	Award	Association	Result
2014	Sans famille	Best Film	Burundi Film Festival	Won
