= Vicky R =

- Born: Victoria Rousselot Azizet; August 19, 1996 (age 30); Libreville, Gabon
- Genres: Rap music; Hip-hop
- Instrument: Vocals
- Labels: Believe Digital, Le Crcle, PlayTwo

Victoria Rousselot Azizet Désirée, known professionally as Vicky R, (born 19 August 1996) is a Gabonese rapper and singer active in France who also produces music. In 2013, she gained public recognition with the release of her single "Leggo", produced by Owoninho and featuring Pitt Platinum. On 16 March 2017, Trace TV presented her as the Gabonese sound producer and rapper ready to shake up the rap scene.

Between 2018 and 2019, Vicky R participated in various talent discovery events in Paris and gained attention on social media through her various freestyles, including one on Chilla's Planet Rap show on Skyrock to coincide with the release of her album. There, she performed her track "Shooter", a previously unreleased song.

In October 2019, she made an appearance on the mixtape La Relève by Deezer, a compilation of new artists of French-language rap and signed with the record label Believe Digital.

== Biography ==
Born in Libreville, Gabon, Vicky R began her studies and left Gabon to settle in France with her family in 2008. Her cousin, Edan Ngomo, took her to a recording studio for the first time in 2008. She learned the basics of rap and began her music career at age 12. In 2013, after performing several freestyles, she met Owoninho, the future producer of the track "Leggo". That same year, she continued her career with tracks such as " T'es pas fait pour" (You're Not Made For It), which was her first music video at the time, and "Sabado", a collaboration with J-Rio'.

All Over The World (AOTW) is the name of her first mixtape, released in 2014. This 8-track mixtape includes several tracks such as "Leggo" and "Let's Kick It". The project was released under Owoninho's Hit Me Up Music label in collaboration with the We Up Grade. Later that year, Owoninho's Hit Me Up Music and NIX's High Definition merged to form The Node Music , which became the rapper's new production company.

== Discography ==
=== Albums ===
- 2014: All Over The World (Mixtape)
- 2020: V

=== Singles ===
- 2013: Leggo
- 2013: T’es pas fait pour
- 2013: Sabado feat J-rio
- 2015: It's ova feat Magasco
- 2015: Ça te fait mal où? feat J-rio et Ng Bling
- 2016: Je reviens bientôt
- 2016: La base
- 2016: Easy
- 2017: Plan B
- 2017: Plan B remix feat J-rio and Zyon Stylei
- 2018: God bless me
- 2019: Horama
- 2019: Comme Personne
- 2019: Shooter
- 2019: Merci
- 2020: BB
- 2020: Bleu Bombay

=== Collaborations ===
- 2013: Sabado with J-rio
- 2014: Je flippe with Dark Haze
- 2015: It's ova with Magasco
- 2015: Ça te fait mal où? with J-rio et Ng Bling
- 2017: Plan B remix with J-rio et Zyon Stylei
