= Chilla (French rapper) =

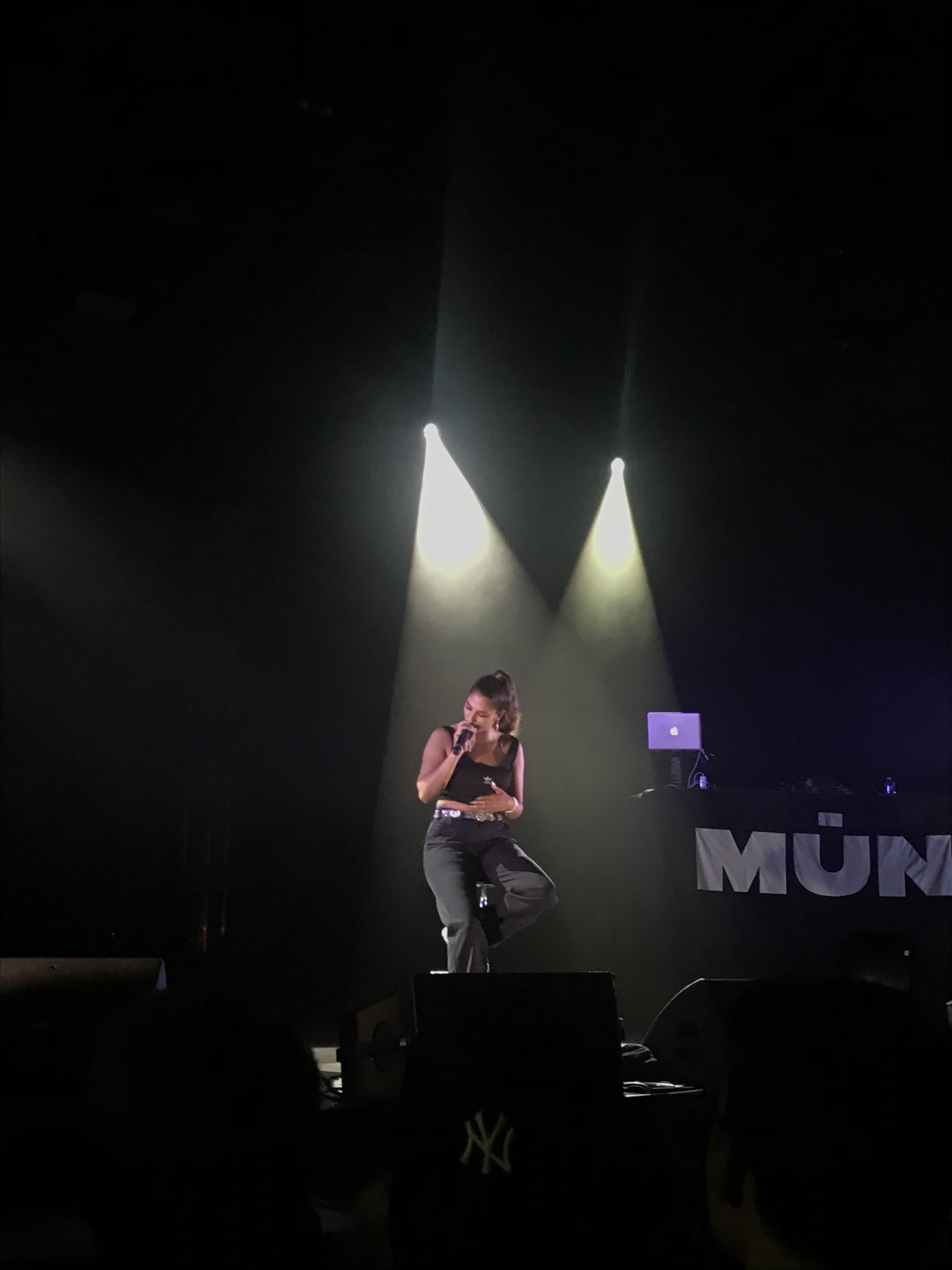
- Chilla performing in 2019

Background information
- Born: Maréva Ranarivelo; 27 April 1994 (age 32)
- Origin: Genolier, Switzerland
- Genres: French hip-hop; rap; Contemporary R&B
- Occupations: Artist; songwriter
- Years active: 2016–present
- Label: Capitol Music France

Maréva Ranarivelo, performing under the name Chilla, is a French-Malagasy artist and rapper. She made her debut in 2016 with the song 'M.B.D. (Métro boulot dodo)' and released her first album, Karma, in 2017. She has been praised for her presence as a woman in France's rap scene and feminist subject matter.

== Early life ==
Maréva Ranarivelo was born on 27 April 1994 and grew up in Genolier, Switzerland. She began rapping in Lyon, France, and appeared on the French game show Talent Street to showcase her artistry.

== Music ==
=== Studio albums ===
Title	Date released
Karma	10 November 2017
Mūn	5 July 2019
EGO	8 August 2023
333	20 September 2024

=== Extended plays ===
Title	Date released
+33	28 June 2024

=== Singles ===
Title	Year	Album
"M.B.D. (Métro boulot dodo)"	2017	Non-album single
"#Balancetonporc"	2018	Non-album single
"1er jour d'école"	2018	Mūn
"Mira"	2019	Mūn
"Dans le Movie #1"	2019	Mūn
"Am Stram Gram"	2019	Mūn
"Oulala"	2019	Mūn
"Pour la vie"	2019	Mūn
"Jungle"	2019	Mūn
"Bridget"	2019	Mūn
"Toi mon amour"	2021	Non-album single
"Pas de limite"	2021	Non-album single
"AHOO" (With Davinhor, Vicky R, Le Juiice, and Bianca Costa)	2021	From the documentary Reines
"Demain" (With Hatik)	2021	EGO
"Cauchemars"	2022	EGO
"Tesla"	2022	EGO
"Zouh"	2022	EGO
"Sans repères"	2022	EGO
"Sonatine"	2022	EGO
"Pour toi"	2022	EGO
"Dos à dos"	2024	333
"J'attends trop de toi"	2024	333
"Petit cœur"	2024	333

== Film ==
Year	Title	Role	Notes
2021	Reines - Pour l'amour du rap	Herself	The single 'AHOO' is created throughout the documentary.
2022	Heartbeast	Chilla (Character)	"Sale chienne" and "Dis leur" are featured.
2025	Carjackers	Zoé	
