= Mont-Bouët =

Market in Libreville, Gabon

Coordinates: 0.3989°N 9.4528°E

Marché du Mont-Bouët
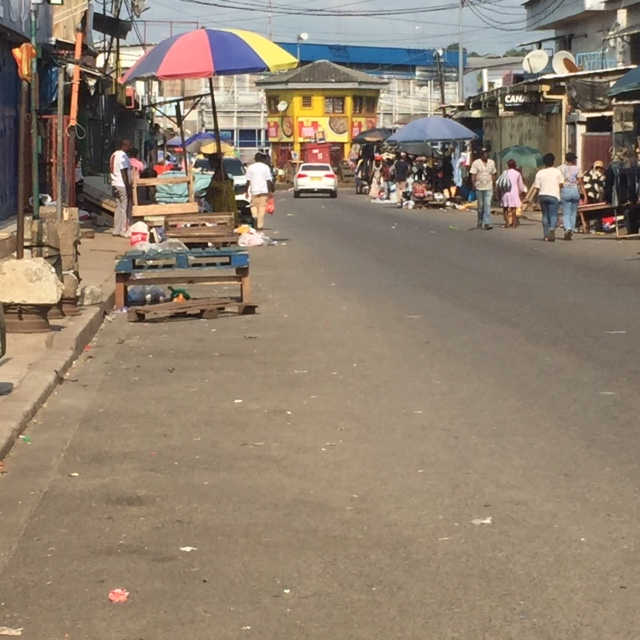
- Marché du Mont-Bouët (2026)
- Location: Libreville, Estuaire, Gabon
- Address: 3rd arrondissement
- Opened: Early 1970s
- Developer: Commune de Libreville
- Manager: Mairie de Libreville
- Owner: Commune de Libreville
- Num. of stores: Several thousand stalls, boxes and shops

The Marché du Mont-Bouët (Mont-Bouët market) is an open-air market located in the 3rd arrondissement of Libreville, the capital of Gabon. Widely described as the largest market in Gabon, it serves as the principal commercial hub of the capital and a major centre of wholesale and retail distribution for food, textiles and manufactured goods. The market takes its name from the surrounding Mont-Bouët district, itself named in honour of the 19th-century French admiral Édouard Bouët-Willaumez, who founded Libreville in 1849.

Operational since the early 1970s, the market has grown into a sprawling commercial complex hosting several thousand traders of Gabonese, West African, Lebanese, Mauritanian, Chinese and Korean origin. The market has been repeatedly damaged by fires since the late 2000s, events that have prompted plans for a replacement commercial complex and successive municipal programmes of urban redevelopment.

== Location and name ==
The market lies in the Mont-Bouët district of the 3rd arrondissement of Libreville, one of the oldest quarters of the Gabonese capital. The district is named after commandant Édouard Bouët-Willaumez, a French naval officer who, as governor of Senegal in the 1840s, ordered the construction of the nearby Fort d'Aumale and founded, in 1849, the village to which he gave the name Libreville in order to resettle slaves freed from the Brazilian slave ship L'Elizia. Mont-Bouët is also noted locally as the birthplace of Léon Mba, the first President of Gabon.

According to a 2009 master's thesis in geography on the layout of the market, the site was first brought into service at the beginning of the 1970s on land situated on the periphery of what had been colonial-era vieux Libreville and which had originally been planned as a cemetery.

== Description ==
The Marché du Mont-Bouët functions as an open-air complex organised around a central covered hall and a network of adjacent streets densely occupied by stalls, boxes (box), shops and informal traders. The covered hall traditionally shelters the trade in fresh foodstuffs, butchery, fish and local handicrafts, while trade in local agricultural produce takes place outside the hall, in the courtyards of established merchants, and trade in manufactured goods takes place in the trading houses and companies that encircle the market.

The market functions simultaneously as a wholesale and retail venue and occupies a pivotal position in the distribution and supply networks of food, consumer goods and services for the population of Libreville and its periphery. Goods on sale include fruit and vegetables, meat, fresh and frozen fish, live and prepared poultry, bushmeat, textiles imported from West Africa, second-hand European clothing (friperie), footwear, jewellery, household appliances, mobile telephones, kitchen utensils and items of traditional medicine. Above many of the shops bordering the market, informal restaurants and maquis run by local women serve Gabonese dishes as well as Middle Eastern and North African food. A commercial gallery known as the Galerie Marchande Hassan Choucaire, described as the first shopping centre opened in Libreville, adjoins the market.

According to the Gabonese press, the market counted around 4,000 traders in 2008, making it a major pole of commercial exchange in the capital. Wholesale trade in the market was described as being dominated by West African, Chinese, Korean, Lebanese and Mauritanian merchants, with maize mills largely operated by West Africans and Cameroonians. The official opening hours run from dawn until dusk every day except Sunday afternoon, although in practice trading activity frequently spills onto surrounding pavements and roads.

A 2025 round-table meeting between the municipality and trader unions brought to public attention the regulatory framework governing the market, including a closing time set at 17:30 and the ticket journalier (daily ticket) of 1,000 CFA francs levied on traders; representatives of the Syndicat des débrouillards du Gabon and of the NGO Solidarité pour le Développement du Travail called for an extension of opening hours to 20:30 and for the abolition of the closure tax.

== History ==
The Mont-Bouët district predates the market by several decades; it was one of the older working-class quarters of colonial Libreville and has long been associated with popular commerce. The market itself was established in the early 1970s as Libreville expanded rapidly in the years following Gabonese independence in 1960.

With the demographic growth of the capital, the market developed into the country's principal commercial marketplace and a central node in Libreville's food-distribution networks, supplanting earlier market places in importance. From the 1990s onward, the growing density of informal trade, the dilapidation of built infrastructure, the proliferation of unauthorised electrical connections and the encroachment of stalls onto adjoining roads were repeatedly identified by Gabonese authorities and researchers as structural problems.

Adjacent to the market is the former location of Libreville's main gare routière (bush-taxi stand). The site later became associated with congestion, informal occupation and insecurity, and long-distance buses and taxis-brousse now operate from peripheral sites, especially the PK8 gare routière on the N1.

== Fires ==
The Marché du Mont-Bouët has been struck by a long succession of major fires, which have collectively destroyed large parts of the site and caused significant losses to traders.

A fire in the night of 13–14 August 2009 destroyed approximately one third of the market; roughly 400 traders' stalls were reported burnt, causing severe disruption to food supply in Libreville.

On the evening of 16 October 2012, a violent fire ravaged the part of the market located behind the local branch of the Banque internationale pour le commerce et l'industrie du Gabon (BICIG), an area predominantly occupied by sellers of second-hand clothing, poultry, bushmeat and tailors. The Minister of the Interior, the Minister of National Defence and the Mayor of Libreville visited the site, and fire-fighters, reinforced by crews from the airport, were able only to contain the blaze, which forced the market to close for 48 hours.

In the night of 21–22 May 2013, a fire destroyed more than 100 shops and boxes in a newly constructed multi-storey building at the heart of the market; material losses were estimated in billions of CFA francs. The fire was fought by Libreville's fire-service, the Republican Guard, ASECNA personnel and volunteers from the Gabonese Red Cross; the Prime Minister, Raymond Ndong Sima, along with the ministers of Defence and of the Interior and senior police and gendarmerie officers, visited the site.

A further fire in the night of 27–28 October 2014 broke out in the Petit-Paris sector of the market and spread to the so-called marché de Patience. Fire-fighters struggled to extinguish the blaze because many of the fire hydrants installed in the area were reportedly dry; volunteers formed a bucket brigade to supplement the efforts of the fire-service. This episode occurred less than two years after the 2012 fire and again affected buildings that had been constructed specifically to improve trader safety; witnesses attributed the origin of the fire to an electrical short-circuit.

During the night of 8–9 August 2023, a violent fire broke out around 20:30 local time and destroyed a multi-storey commercial building housing around twenty shops; the fire-fighting effort was hampered by the narrow, congested access routes inside the market, and black, asphyxiating smoke spread across the district. Among the affected merchants were Senegalese traders, and some members of the Senegalese community in Libreville publicly suggested that the fires were deliberately directed at foreign traders, a claim that was not substantiated by Gabonese authorities.

The fires have been repeatedly attributed, in press reporting and in academic work, to the combination of inflammable construction materials, unauthorised electrical connections, the density of stored goods, the narrowness of circulation paths inside the market and the inadequacy of fire-fighting infrastructure, including the absence of a fire station in the 3rd arrondissement and the poor state of fire hydrants in the area. The recurrence of fires in the Mont-Bouët market, together with comparable incidents at the markets of Adawlato in Lomé (January 2013) and Kantamanto in Accra (May 2013), was cited in a 2014 feature in Jeune Afrique and in a 2017 article in the academic journal Ateliers d'anthropologie as part of a wider pattern affecting central markets in African capitals and fuelling debate on their replacement by modern shopping malls.

== Grand Marché de Libreville project ==
In the wake of the successive fires, the municipality of Libreville signed an agreement in June 2012 with the Swiss group Webcor, under which the latter committed to finance a new commercial complex intended to complement and decongest the Mont-Bouët market. The convention, valued at 27 billion CFA francs (approximately €41 million), provided for a 50-year concession under which Webcor would design, build and operate the future Grand Marché de Libreville (GML).

Announced on a 70,000 m² plot in the Jardins de la Peyrie, only a short distance from Mont-Bouët, the project was designed by the Dubai-based firm Agora Engineering and Development as a four-storey building comprising 186 shops, 420 boxes and 2,562 stalls, with capacity for more than 3,000 traders. According to one of Webcor's directors, Philippe Beck, the project was intended to create "a central market responding to the commercial habits and consumption patterns specific to Libreville" and to relieve pressure on the nearby Mont-Bouët market.

Ground-breaking took place in late November 2013 and the complex was originally due to be delivered in December 2015 for an opening scheduled for the first quarter of 2016. However, progress stalled; by 2017, Gabonese reporting indicated that the project had not advanced beyond initial earthworks and that the equipment mobilised at the site had disappeared, while the reasons for the delay remained unclear.

== Recent developments ==
On 17 January 2024, the commune of Libreville, under the délégué spécial Jude Ibrahim Rapontchombo, launched an operation dubbed Restauration de l'ordre urbain aimed at removing stalls and informal constructions encroaching on the public domain in the 3rd arrondissement. The operation targeted the perimeter of the Mont-Bouët market and met with strong resistance from traders, who reinstalled their merchandise on pavements and roadways as soon as municipal teams had passed.

On 3 June 2025, the new délégué spécial of the commune of Libreville, Adrien Nguema Mba, met with representatives of the trader unions of the Mont-Bouët market to discuss grievances relating to the 17:30 closing time and to the 1,000 CFA franc ticket journalier. Following the meeting, the president of the Syndicat des débrouillards du Gabon, Benjamin Guimard-Varrell, reported that the délégué spécial had agreed to abolish the closure tax and to review the order (arrêté 0.52) governing certain levies.

In mid-August 2025, municipal teams marked out the buildings to be demolished along the axis linking the police tower (la Tour) and the former bush-taxi station, as part of a wider programme of urban redevelopment announced by the Gabonese authorities. The mayor of Libreville convened meeting with affected owners and occupiers at the city hall; the stated aims of the operation were to restore circulation, enhance public safety and improve the quality of life of market users.

In late 2025, Mayor Pierre Matthieu Obame Etoughé publicly identified the overlapping of land titles as a major obstacle to the modernisation of the market: several parcels within the Mont-Bouët perimeter were found to be subject to competing titles between the municipality and private users, creating legal uncertainty and impeding any reorganisation of commercial spaces. The mayor announced the creation of special technical commissions to resolve the dispute.

== Reputation and reception ==
Mont-Bouët is regularly cited in travel guides and hospitality industry materials as the largest market in Gabon and as a major cultural and commercial attraction of Libreville; visitors are consistently advised to exercise caution because of overcrowding and pickpocketing in the market's narrow alleys. Gabonese and French commentators have characterised the market as a cosmopolitan meeting place of the city's various communities, a key source of household supply for middle- and low-income households, and a site with a distinctive atmosphere combining West African textiles, European second-hand clothing, local foodstuffs and street food.

At the same time, academic analyses and Gabonese press reporting have drawn attention to the structural fragility of the site, characterising Mont-Bouët as a confined, enclaved and insalubrious space in which defects of design, insufficient sanitary and drainage infrastructure, and conflicts over the occupation of selling space coexist with its economic importance to the capital.

== See also ==
- Libreville
- Economy of Gabon
- Léon Mba
- Édouard Bouët-Willaumez
