= Nadège Noële Ango-Obiang =

Gabonese writer (born 1973)

Nadège Noële Ango Obiang
- Born: 20 December 1973 (age 52); Libreville
- Occupation: Writer

Nadège Noële Ango Obiang (born December 20, 1973, in Libreville in Gabon) is a Gabonese writer. Her literary works include short stories, drama, romance, pictures, scripts and poetry. Obiang has a university degree in Economics. She combines the two professions of being a writer and an economist.

== Career ==
She received her first prize at the age of 17 for her poem Rien tout nuit, during the 6th Komo poetic recital in Gabon on April 26, 1991.

In 1997, she won the Poetry Prize at Omar Bongo University while she was in her second year of pursuing her economics degree. In 2000, she won the special Jury Prize of the BICIG contest as a friend of the arts and letters, for her new novel L'amour dans deux visages. The same year, with her song Le chant des naufrages, she won the silver hibiscus poetry contest of the Union of Gabonese Writers (known in French as l'Union des Écrivains Gabonais (UDEG)). This turn of events led to her putting together a publication of a collection of poems which she published in 2001.
