= Marie-Augustine Houangni Ambouroué =

Gabonese politician

- Occupation: Politician
- Children: Pascal Houangni Ambouroue

Marie-Augustine Houangni-Ambouroué is a Gabonese politician. She was the first woman to be mayor of Port-Gentil, Gabon, the country's second largest city.

Of Orungu descent, Houangni Ambouroué held a number of posts in municipal government and served in the National Assembly of Gabon. She served as mayor of Port-Gentil from 1980 to 1987 and 1997 to 2000. A politician with the Parti gabonais du progrès (PGP), she was ousted in 2000 and replaced by PGP leader Pierre-Louis Agondjo-Okawe, whose Nkomi faction was ascendant. In 2001, she created a new political party, Alliance des Republicains pour le Developpement (ARD).

Her son Pascal Houangni Ambouroue served in the cabinet of Gabon as Minister of Petroleum and Hydrocarbons.
