= Peggy Lucie Auleley =

Gabonese writer

Peggy Pâquerette Lucie Auleley (born 1971) is a Gabonese author. She first gained recognition for her 1998 poetry collection Rêves d'enfants.

== Biography ==
Peggy Auleley was born in September 1971 in Libreville, Gabon, to a father from Guinea and a Gabonese mother. She began writing at a young age, while also pursuing a passion for soccer, playing for the local team RC Sahoty.

Auleley first gained notice for her poetry collection Rêves d'enfants, which came second in the 1998 youth literature contest organized by the Agence de Coopération Culturelle et Technique (today the Organisation internationale de la Francophonie). She had previously come third in a 1995 literary contest hosted by her country's National Program Against AIDS.

She subsequently wrote several books, including the Les larmes du soleil (2012), a story of underprivileged children; Nzamaligué (2016), an homage to acceptance of difference; and the novel L'Héritière du jaspe (2012).

Auleley cites Pierre-Claver Akendengué and Aimé Césaire among her cultural influences.

In addition to her writing, Auleley works as a French teacher. She has three children.

== Selected works ==
- Rêves d'enfants, ACCT, 1998
- Les Larmes du soleil, Odette Maganga Editions, 2012
- L'Héritière du jaspe, Odette Maganga Editions, 2012
- Soleils étranglés, La Doxa Editions, 2015
- Nzamaligué, La Doxa Editions, 2016
