= Lycée Blaise Pascal de Libreville =

Gabonese French school

Coordinates: 0.4343°N 9.4420°E

Lycée Blaise Pascal de Libreville is a French international school in Libreville, Gabon. It includes collège (junior high school) and lycée (senior high school) levels.

The school is named after the 17th-century French scholar Blaise Pascal. It was established in 1992.

== See also ==
- Education in Gabon
- List of international schools
