= Nadia Origo =

French-Gabonese writer and editor (born 1977)

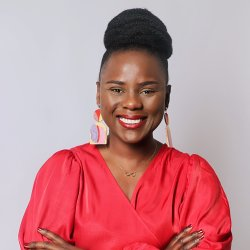
- Born: Nadia Busugwu; 1977 (age 48–49); Mouila, Gabon
- Education: University of Montpellier; Paris-Sorbonne University
- Occupations: Writer; editor; publisher

Nadia Origo (born 1977) is a French-Gabonese writer and editor. She founded the Paris-based publishing house La Doxa Éditions in 2008, with the aim of giving African writers a platform in Europe.

== Early life and education ==
Nadia Origo was born in Mouila, southern Gabon, in 1977. Her birth name was Nadia Busugwu.

She moved to France around 2005, where she studied geography at the University of Montpellier. She then obtained a doctoral degree from Paris-Sorbonne University, settling in Paris thereafter.

== Work ==
Origo is primarily a novelist, as well as an editor. Her novels frequently include autobiographical elements.

She is considered part of the contemporary generation of Gabonese women writers. Like others of her generation, her work is influenced by the writing of Angèle Rawiri.

Her first novel, Le voyage d'Aurore, was published in 2007. It was followed by several other novels, including J'ai résolu de...., Le bal des débutants, and La valse des initiés. She also produced a book of poetry, Sanglotites équatoriales, in 2014.

In 2012, her short story "Le long courrier d'une amie" was featured in Les lyres de l'Ogooué, a collection of work by Gabonese women writers, alongside Edna Merey-Apinda, Charline Effah, and others.

Origo founded the publishing house La Doxa Éditions in Paris in 2008, with the aim of giving social justice-focused African writers a venue to publish their work in Europe. She subsequently founded Reflets Magazine in 2010. The two efforts are now housed under a parent company run by Origo, called OrigraphCom.

In 2019, Origo published a book on her experience as a Christian entrepreneur, titled Entreprendre c'est faire la guerre. Her first novel, Le voyage d'Aurore, was translated into English by Aquene Kimmel and published under the title Aurore's Journey in 2020.

== Selected works ==
- Le voyage d'Aurore (2007)
- J'ai résolu de.... (2008)
- Le bal des débutants (2012
- La valse des initiés (2014)
- Sanglotites équatoriales (2014)
- Entreprendre c'est faire la guerre (2019)
