= Libreville =

Capital and largest city of Gabon

- Capital city
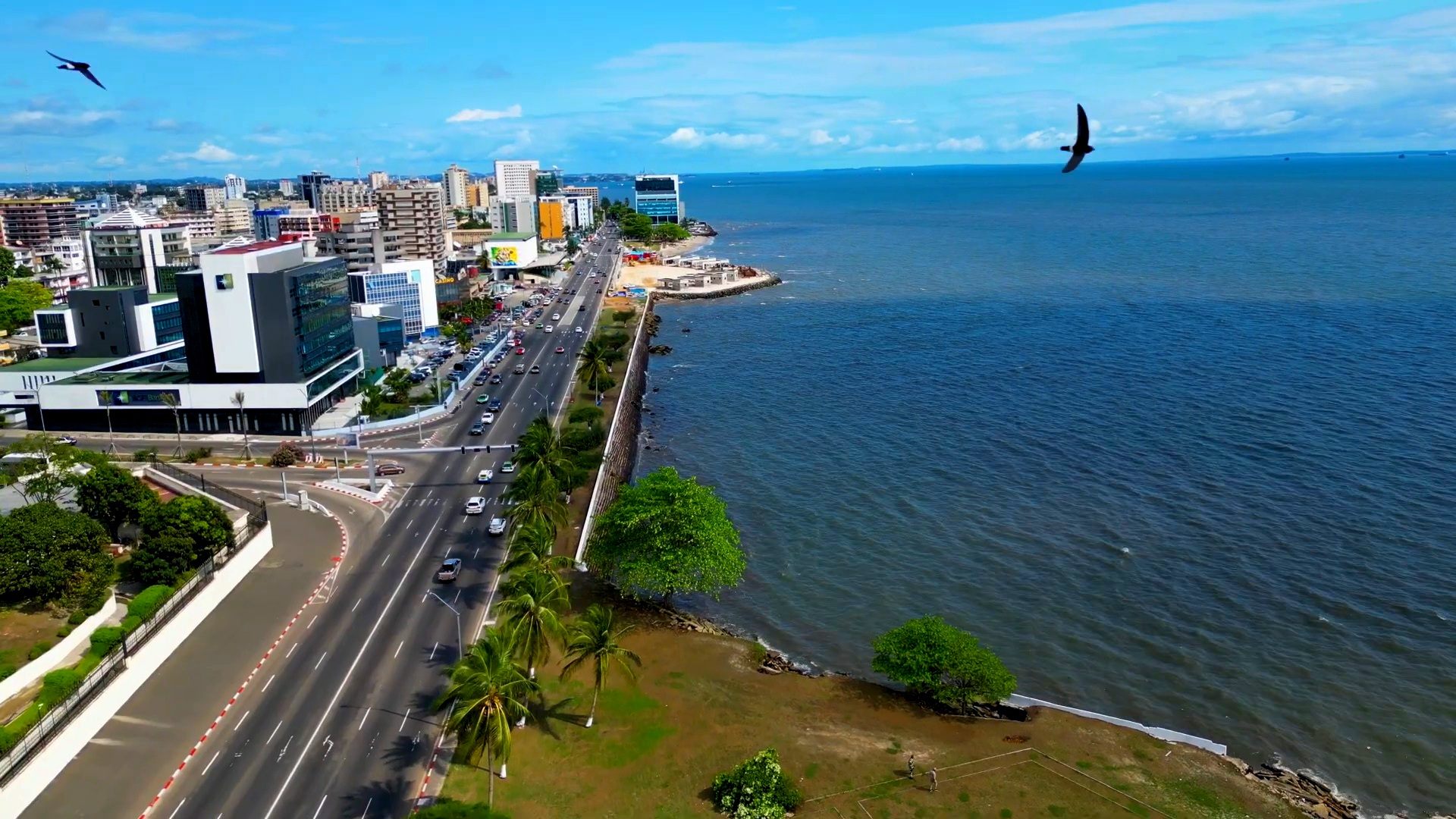
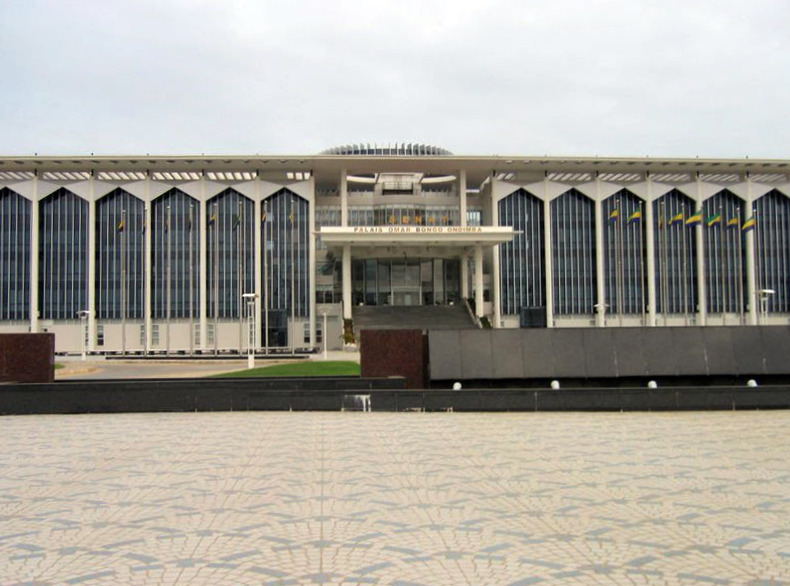
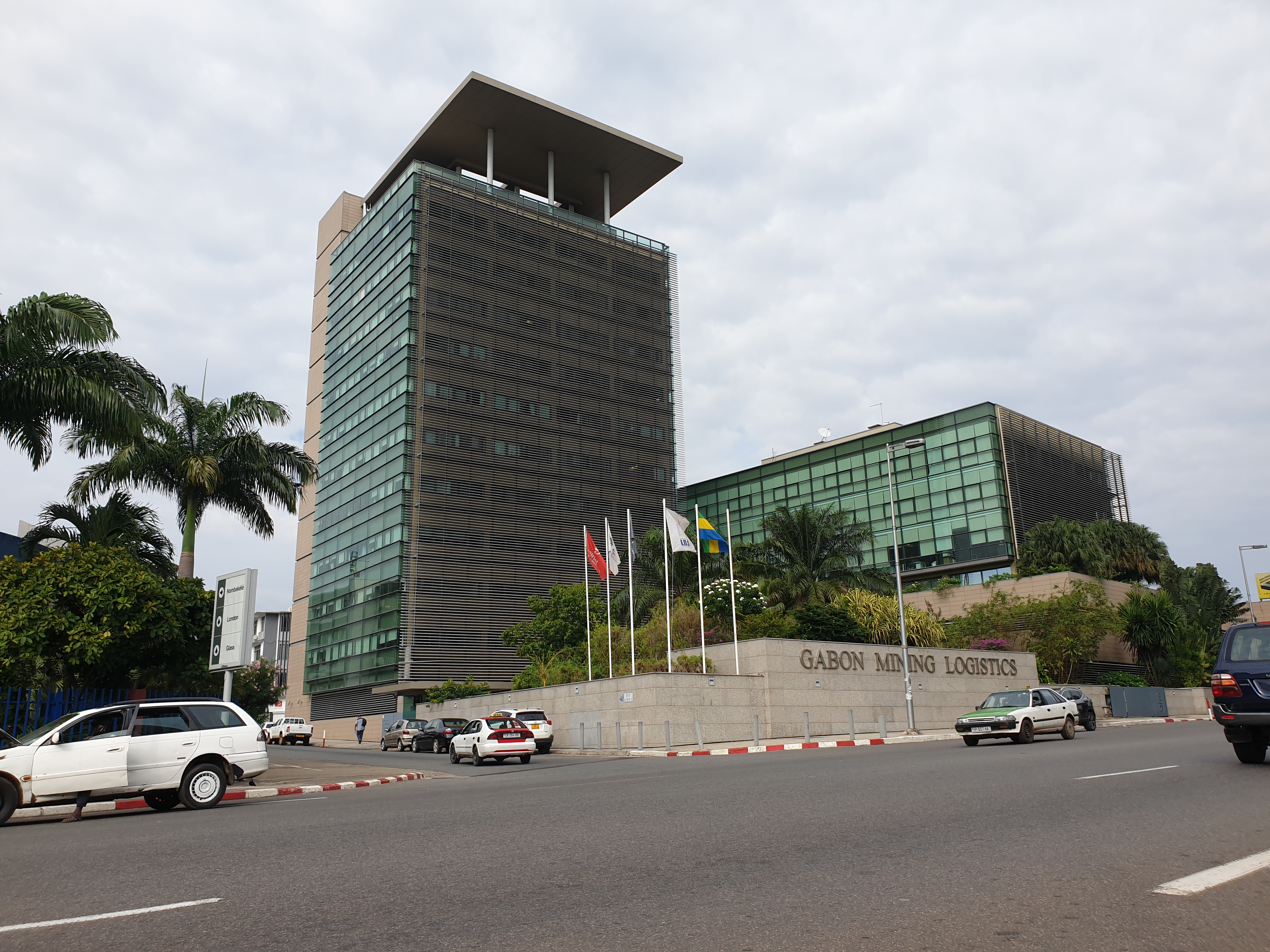
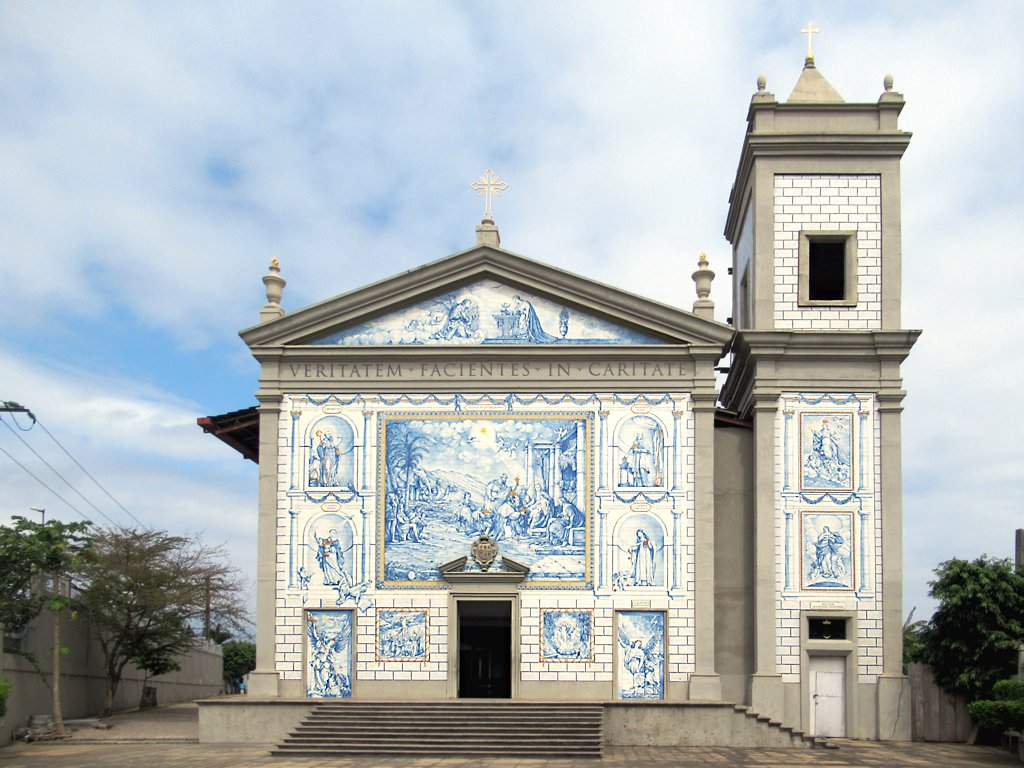
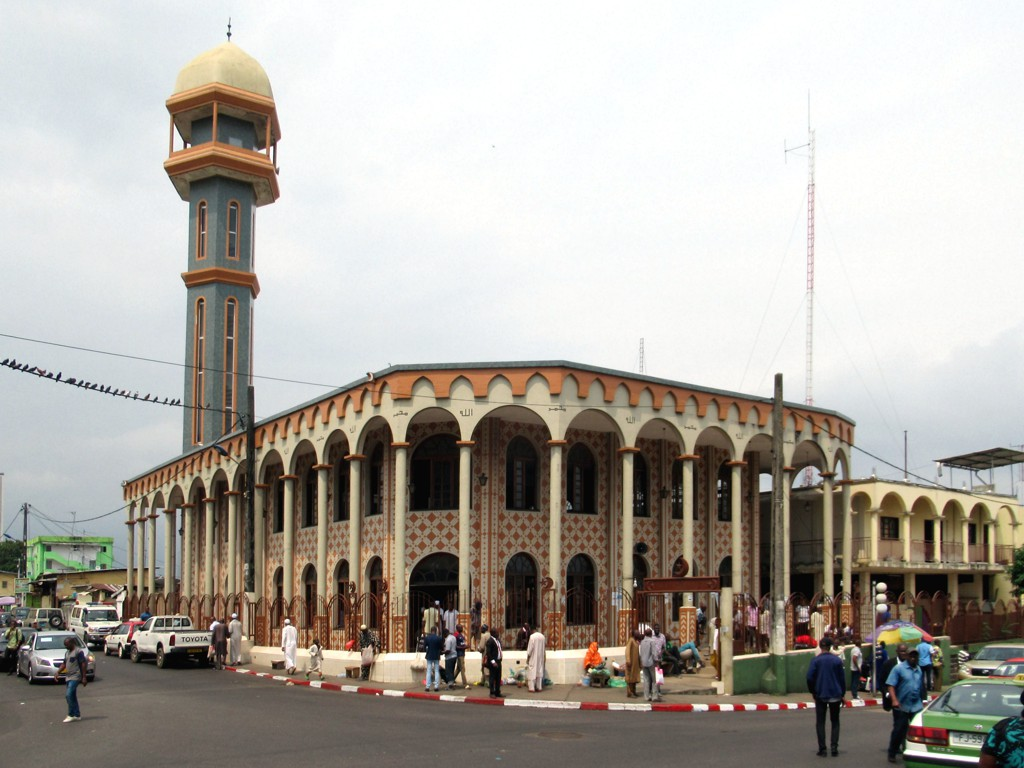
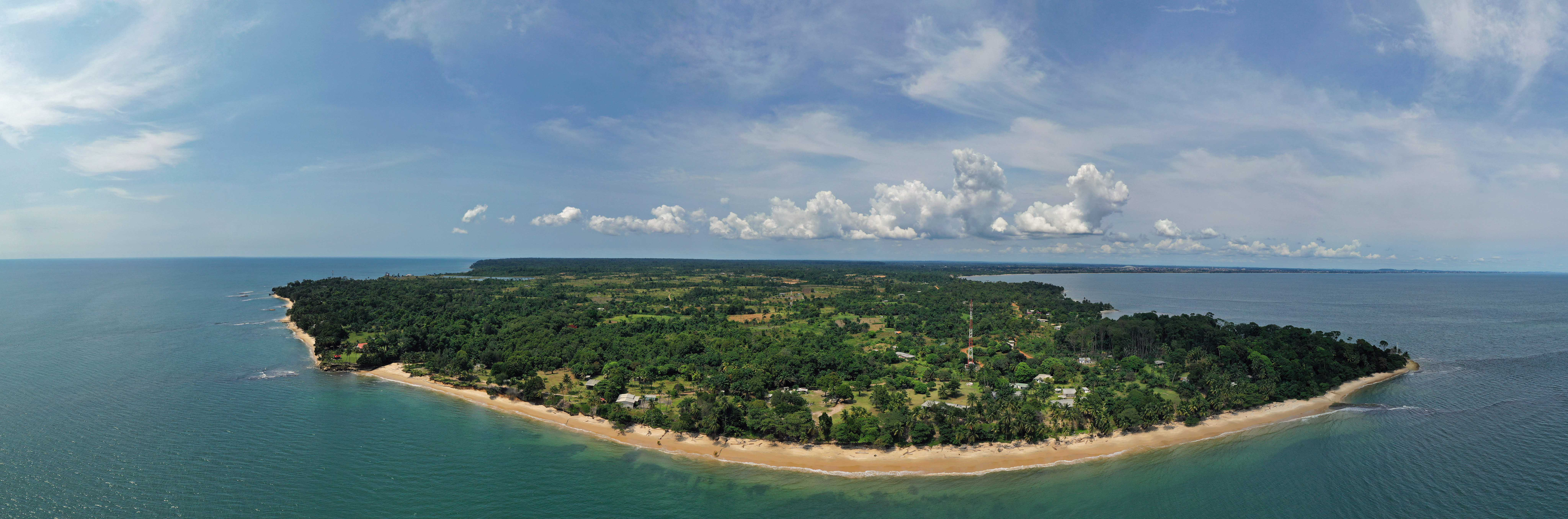
- Boulevard de l‘independance, Palais du Sénat, Gabon Mining Logistics building, Church of Notre-Dame de Lourdes, The Mosquée du CHU (Centre Hospitalier Universitaire), Bay of the Cap

- Flag Coat of arms

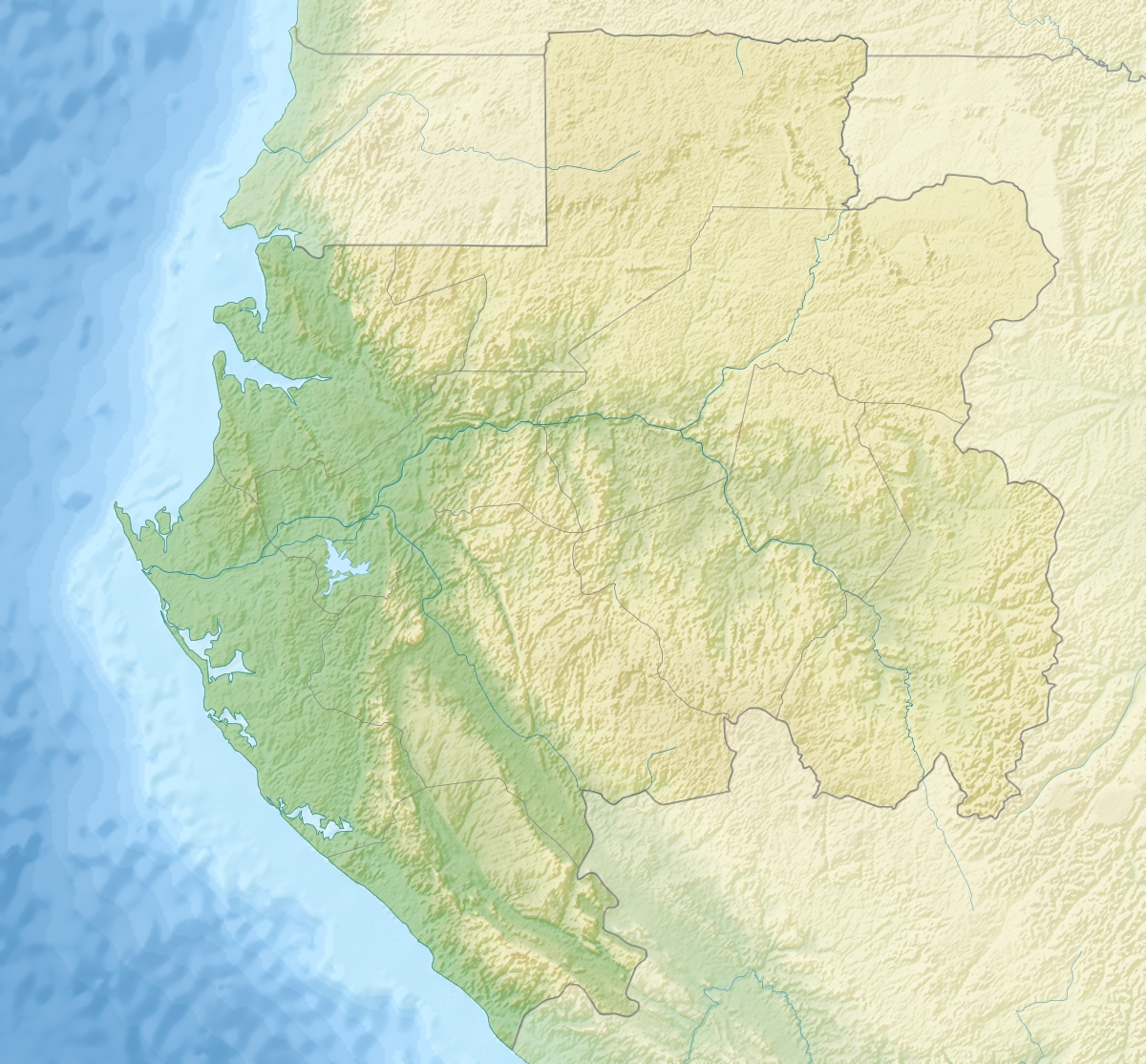
- Location within Gabon Location within Africa
- Coordinates: 0°24′28″N 9°26′25″E
- Country: Gabon
- Province: Estuaire Province
- Capital district: Libreville

Area
  - Land: 65.42 km^{2} (25.26 sq mi)
  - Metro: 189 km^{2} (73 sq mi)

Population (2013 census)
  - Capital city: 703,904
  - Density: 10,760/km^{2} (27,870/sq mi)
- Time zone: UTC+01:00 (WAT)
- HDI (2018): 0.788 high
- Website: www.libreville.ga

Libreville (/ˈlɪbrəˌvɪl/; French: [libʁəvil]) is the capital and largest city of Gabon, located on the Gabon Estuary. Libreville occupies 65 square kilometres (25 sq mi) of the northwestern province of Estuaire. Libreville is also a port on the Gabon Estuary, near the Gulf of Guinea. As of the 2013 census, its population was 703,904.

The area has been inhabited by the Mpongwe people since before the French acquired the land in 1839. It was later an American Christian mission, and a slave resettlement site, before becoming the chief port of the colony of French Equatorial Africa. By the time of Gabonese independence in 1960, the city was a trading post and minor administrative centre with a population of 32,000. Since 1960, Libreville has grown rapidly and now is home to one-third of the national population.

== History ==
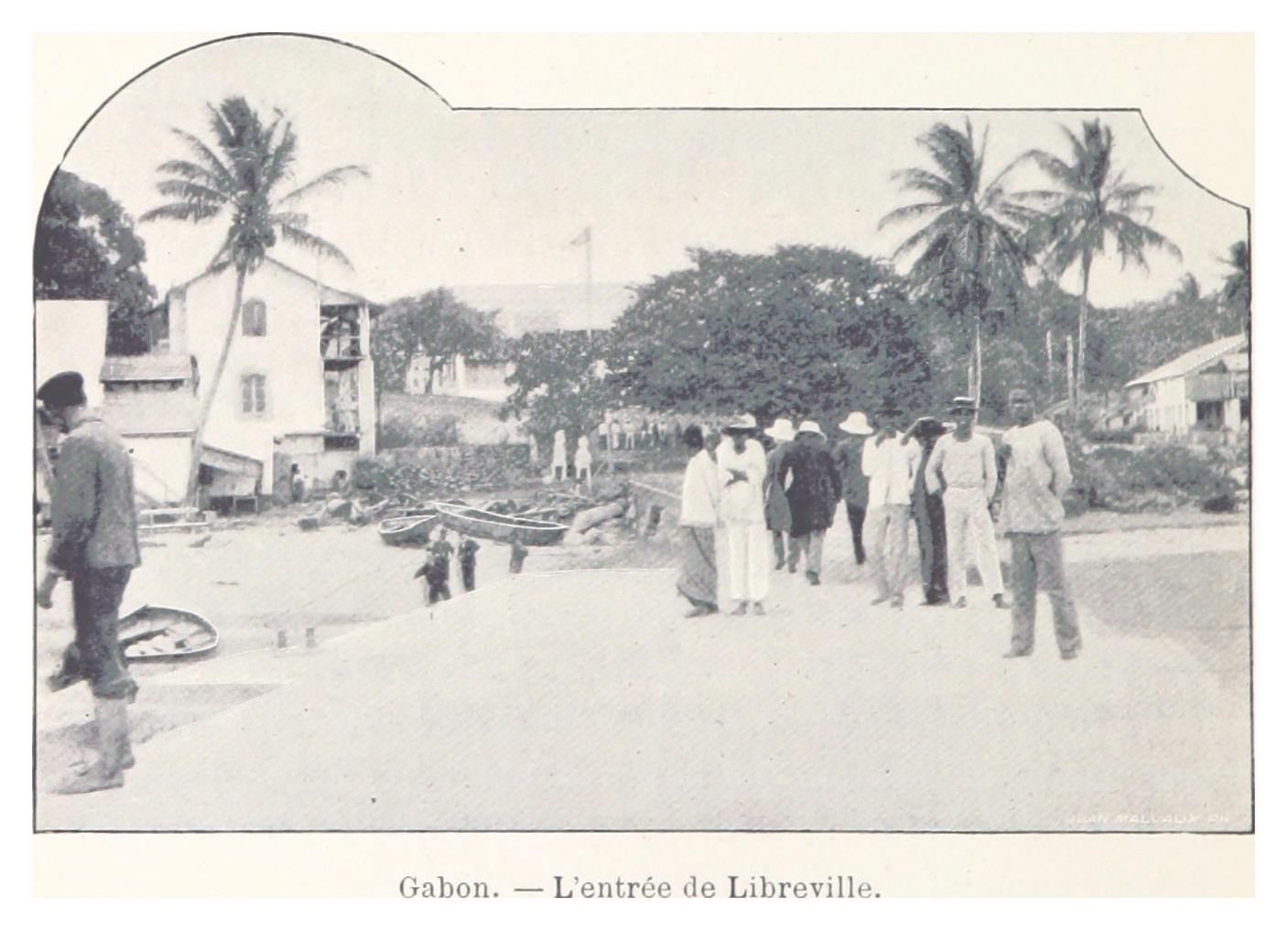
The entrance to Libreville, 1899

Various native peoples lived in or used the area that is now Libreville before colonization, including the Mpongwé tribe. French admiral Édouard Bouët-Willaumez negotiated a trade and protection treaty with the local Mpongwé ruler, Antchoué Komé Rapontcombo (known to the French as King Denis), in 1839.

American missionaries from New England established a mission in Baraka, Gabon, on what is now Libreville, in 1842. In 1846, the Brazilian slave ship L'Elizia, carrying slaves from the Congo, was captured near Loango by the French navy which was tasked with contributing to the British Blockade of Africa. Fifty-two of the freed slaves were resettled on the site of Libreville (French for "Freetown") in 1849. Following the French Revolution of 1848 and establishment of the French Second Republic, the former slaves organized an election to select leaders of the new village in 1849. A former slave named Mountier was elected Mayor of Libreville. Libreville was the administrative capital of France's Congo-Gabon colony between 1888 and 1904, when the capital moved to Brazzaville.

In 1910, Gabon became part of French Equatorial Africa (Afrique équatoriale française, AEF). French companies were allowed to exploit the Middle Congo (modern-day Congo-Brazzaville). It soon became necessary to build a railroad that would connect Brazzaville, the terminus of the river navigation on the Congo River and the Ubangi River, with the Atlantic coast. As rapids make it impossible to navigate on the Congo River past Brazzaville, and the coastal railroad terminus site had to allow for the construction of a deep-sea port, authorities chose the site of Ponta Negra instead of Libreville as originally envisaged. Construction of the Congo–Ocean Railway began in 1921, and Libreville was surpassed by the rapid growth of Pointe-Noire, farther down the coast. Libreville received its first bank branch when Paris-based Banque de l'Afrique Occidentale opened a branch in 1930. In 1940, Libreville was the central focus of the Battle of Gabon as Charles de Gaulle's Free French forces, supported by the Royal Navy, moved to consolidate control over French Equatorial Africa.

With national independence on the horizon, Léon M'ba won Libreville's first free mayoral election in 1956. Mba was later the first president of independent Gabon. The city's population was only 32,000 at independence, but grew rapidly thereafter. It now houses one-third of the national population.

== Geography ==
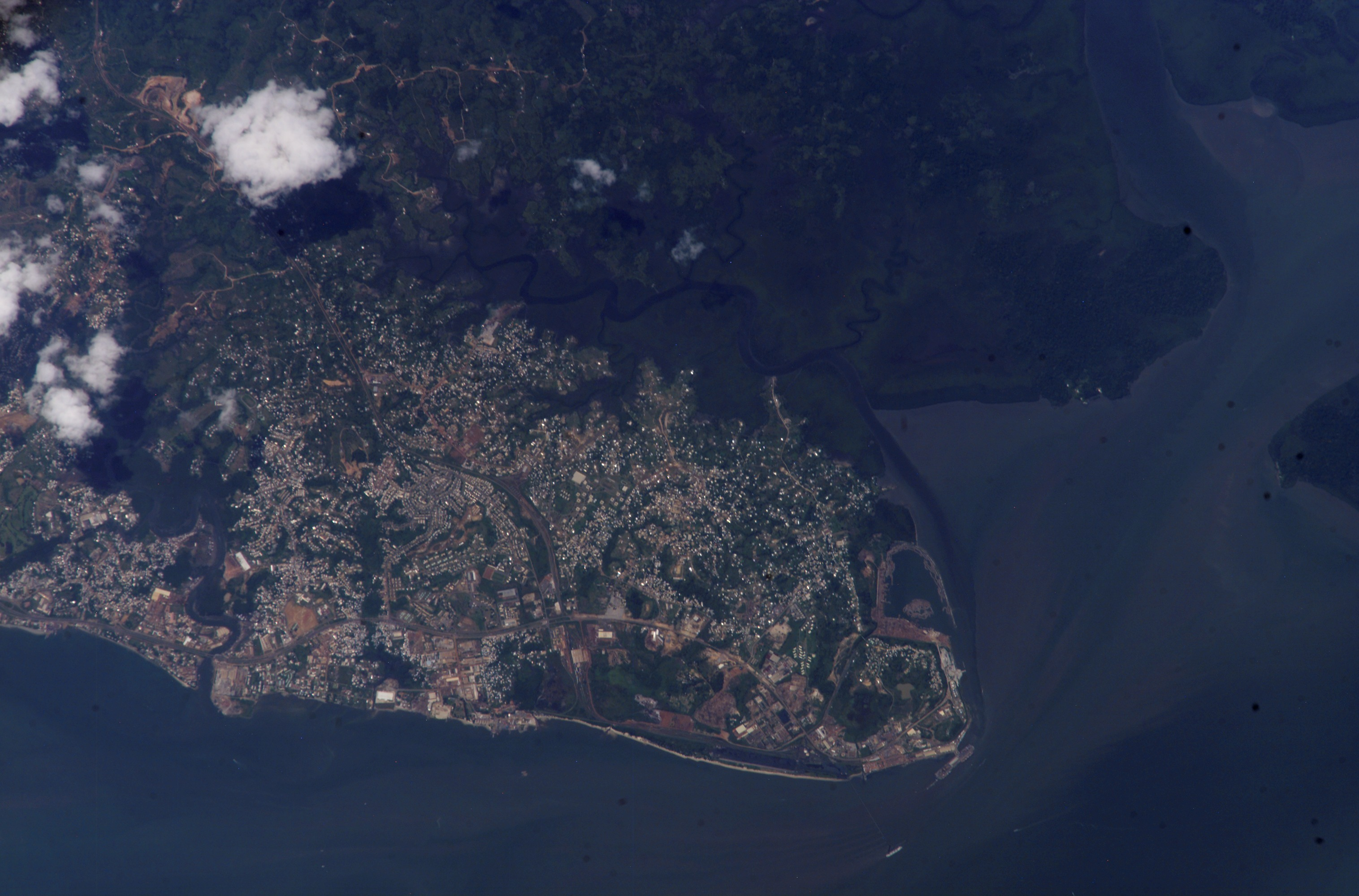
Satellite view of the southern tip of Libreville

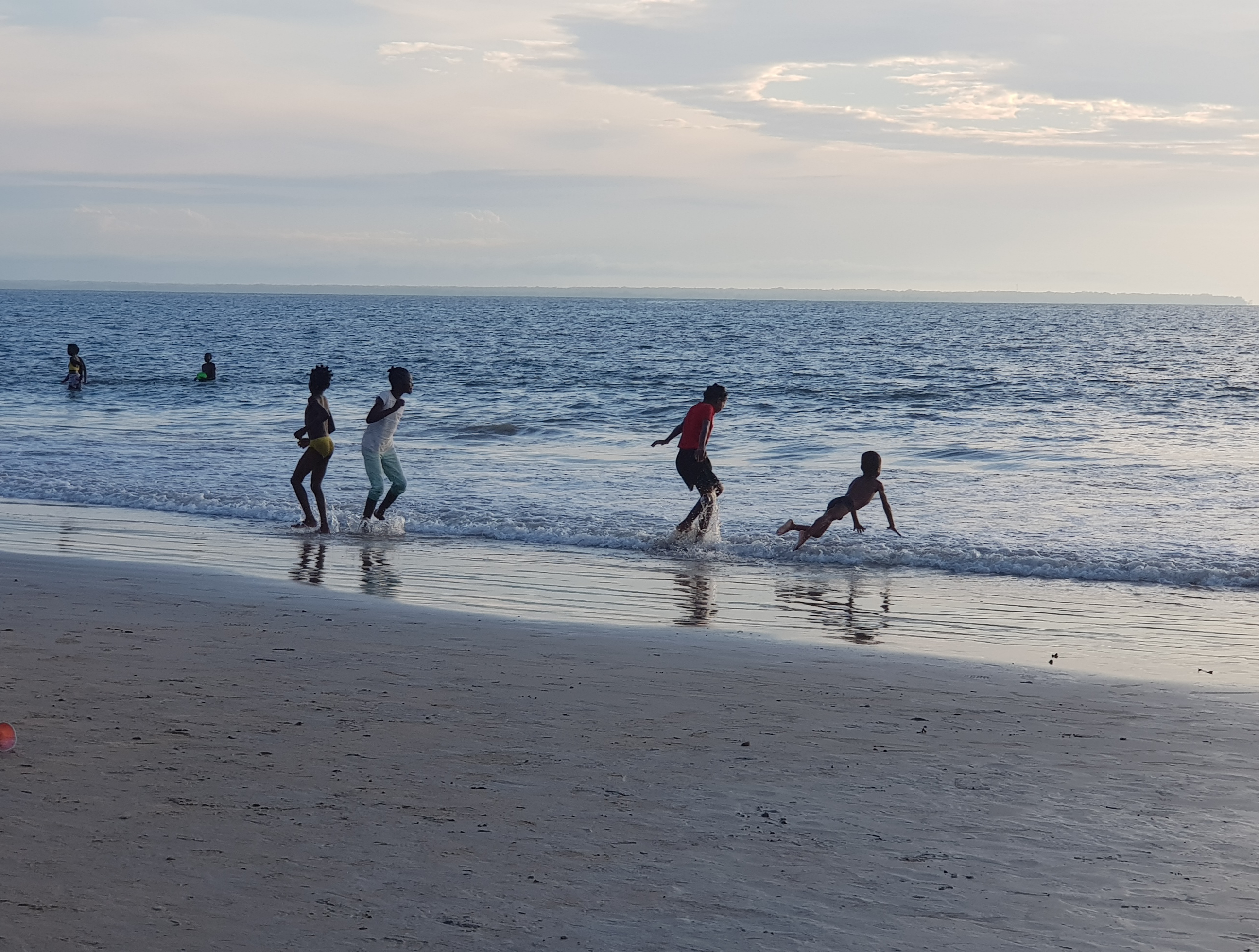
Beach in Libreville

From north to south, major districts of the city are the residential area Batterie IV, Quartier Louis (known for its nightlife), Mont-Bouët and Nombakélé (busy commercial areas), Glass (the first European settlement in Gabon), Oloumi (a major industrial area) and Lalala, a residential area. The city's port and train station on the Trans-Gabon Railway line to Franceville lie in Owendo, south of the main built-up area. Inland from these districts lie poorer residential areas. North-west of Equatorial Guinea is where the city stands, labeling the city as a part of north-west Gabon. In terms of the country's surrounding boundaries, north is Cameroon, east is Congo, and south-east is the Democratic Republic of the Congo. It also rides the shores of the South Atlantic Ocean, which is on the country's west coast for reference. Additionally, in terms of aquatic geography, the Komo River passes through the city and empties into the ocean. The Komo River also stands as a potential hydroelectric source of power for the city which could generate supportive amounts of energy and power. Several city districts provide distinct and separate benefits throughout the city as well. In terms of nightlife, the Quartier Louis sector is most renowned. One of this zone's sides includes the coast, and this heavily influences the possible activities available in the area. Commercial areas within Libreville are housed in the Mont-Bouët and Nombakélé districts, which feature several shopping centers and stations selling purchasable goods. Oloumi contains much of the city's industry, integrating production separately from the districts that focus upon other aspects. Finally, Lalala and Batterie IV are residential and housing sectors, where much of the populace resides.

=== Climate ===
Libreville features a tropical monsoon climate (Am) with a lengthy wet season and a short dry season. The city's wet season, which is also its autumn, winter and spring, spans about nine months (September through May), with a great deal of rain falling during these months. Its dry season (or summer) lasts from June through August, and is caused by the cold Benguela Current reaching its northernmost extent and suppressing rainfall. Despite the lack of rain, Libreville remains very cloudy during this time of year.

As is common with many cities with this climate, average temperatures remain relatively constant throughout the course of the year, with average high temperatures at around 29 °C (84 °F).

Climate data for Libreville (1991–2020)
Month	Jan	Feb	Mar	Apr	May	Jun	Jul	Aug	Sep	Oct	Nov	Dec	Year
Mean daily maximum °C (°F)	30.6 (87.1)	31.1 (88.0)	31.1 (88.0)	31.1 (88.0)	30.6 (87.1)	28.9 (84.0)	27.8 (82.0)	28.3 (82.9)	28.9 (84.0)	29.4 (84.9)	29.4 (84.9)	30.0 (86.0)	29.8 (85.6)
Daily mean °C (°F)	27.3 (81.1)	27.5 (81.5)	27.5 (81.5)	27.5 (81.5)	27.3 (81.1)	25.9 (78.6)	24.8 (76.6)	25.3 (77.5)	26.1 (79.0)	26.4 (79.5)	26.4 (79.5)	27.0 (80.6)	26.6 (79.9)
Mean daily minimum °C (°F)	23.9 (75.0)	23.9 (75.0)	23.9 (75.0)	23.9 (75.0)	23.9 (75.0)	22.8 (73.0)	21.7 (71.1)	22.2 (72.0)	23.3 (73.9)	23.3 (73.9)	23.3 (73.9)	23.9 (75.0)	23.3 (73.9)
Average rainfall mm (inches)	243 (9.6)	236 (9.3)	338 (13.3)	344 (13.5)	246 (9.7)	15 (0.6)	5 (0.2)	18 (0.7)	114 (4.5)	419 (16.5)	464 (18.3)	298.4 (11.75)	2,840.4 (111.83)
Average rainy days	14.5	13.9	18.5	18.8	16.1	1.8	1.0	2.5	11.2	22.4	23.1	18.0	161.9
Average relative humidity (%)	83	82	83	83	83	82	81	82	83	85	86	84	83
Mean monthly sunshine hours	148.8	155.4	158.1	162.0	155.0	108.0	93.0	99.2	102.0	105.0	114.0	142.6	1,643.5
Source: NOAA

== Landmarks ==
- Arboretum de Sibang
- Palais du bord de mer
- National Museum of Arts, Rites and Traditions of Gabon (Musee National des Arts, Rites et Traditions)
- Mont-Bouët

== Education ==
The Omar Bongo University was founded in 1970.

There are several high-end international schools in Libreville, including:

- American International School of Libreville – American curriculum
- Lycée Blaise Pascal de Libreville – French curriculum
- International School of Gabon Ruban Vert – IB curriculum

== Places of worship ==
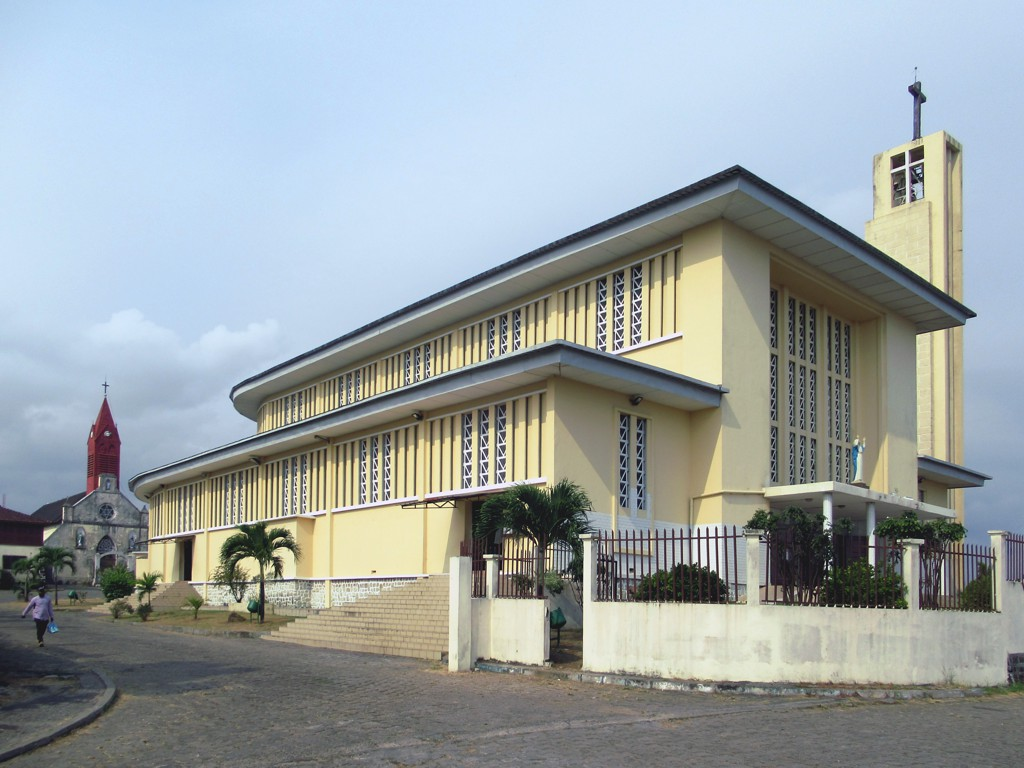
Cathedral of Our Lady of the Assumption of Libreville

Among the places of worship, they are predominantly Christian churches and temples: Roman Catholic Archdiocese of Libreville (Catholic Church), Église de l'Alliance chrétienne et missionnaire du Gabon (Alliance World Fellowship), Assemblies of God, Evangelical Church of Gabon. There are also Muslim mosques.

== Languages ==
Libreville is one of several African cities where French is truly becoming a native language, with some local features.

== Economy ==
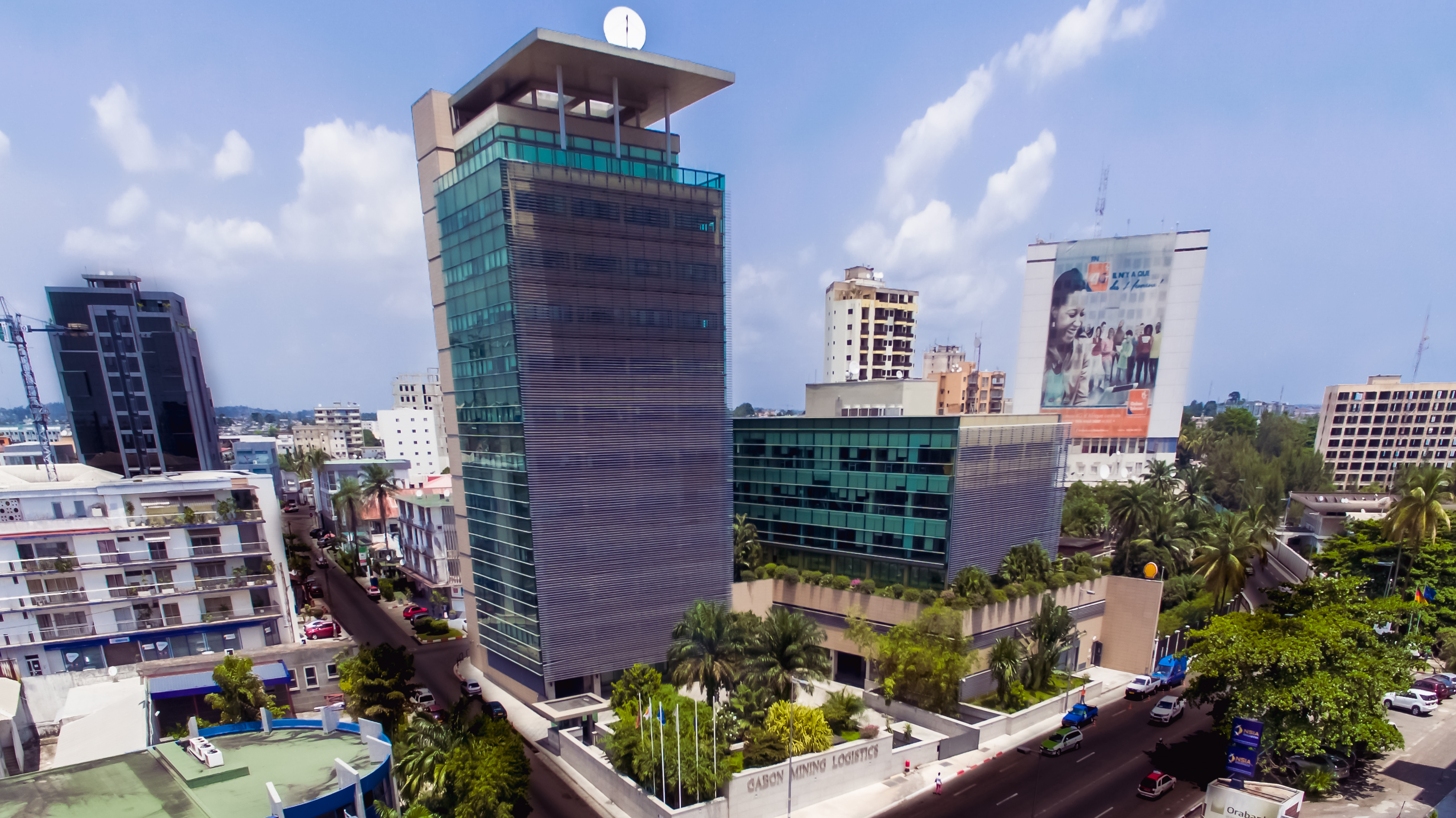
Gabon Mining Logistics in Libreville

The economy of Libreville, the capital and largest city of Gabon, is the principal economic centre of the country and one of the most concentrated urban economies in Central Africa. Although Gabon's wealth derives overwhelmingly from petroleum production centred on Port-Gentil, Libreville functions as the seat of government, the country's primary commercial, financial and administrative hub, and the leading gateway for non-oil imports and exports through the neighbouring port complex of Owendo. Home to roughly one third of the national population, estimated at about 915,000 in the metropolitan area in 2026, the city concentrates the bulk of Gabon's formal private sector employment, banking assets, service industries and light manufacturing.

The city's economy rests on several interlocking pillars including the public administration and diplomatic sector; the twin commercial and mineral ports at Owendo; the processing and export of timber from the Nkok Special Economic Zone just inland of the capital; light industry including cement, brewing, food processing, shipbuilding and sawmilling; a substantial retail, wholesale and informal commercial sector centred on the Marché du Mont-Bouët; the banking and financial-services industry led by the Gabonese multinational BGFIBank; a growing construction and real-estate sector; and the transport hub functions of Léon-Mba International Airport and the western terminus of the Trans-Gabon Railway. Libreville is consistently ranked among the most expensive cities in Africa for expatriates, with a cost of living index in October 2025 placing it first on the continent.

Despite Gabon's relatively high per-capita income by sub-Saharan African standards, the urban economy of Libreville is marked by sharp inequality, significant informal employment, a housing deficit estimated at some 200,000 units, and structural dependence on oil revenues collected at the national level.

=== Industrial development history ===
Libreville was founded in 1849 on the northern bank of the Gabon Estuary as a settlement for slaves liberated by the French navy from the Brazilian ship L'Elizia. From its earliest years the town functioned primarily as a trading post. It became the capital of French Equatorial Africa in 1888 and served as the colony's chief port from 1934 to 1946, exporting timber, rubber and cocoa from concessions in the interior. Lumber, and particularly the export of okoumé logs to European plywood factories, long remained the dominant economic activity. At independence in 1960 the city was a relatively modest administrative and commercial centre of some 32,000 inhabitants.

The discovery of substantial offshore petroleum reserves in the 1970s transformed Gabon's economy and, disproportionately, that of Libreville. While actual crude production was centred on Port-Gentil and the Ogooué Estuary, the resulting oil rents financed a rapid expansion of the capital's public administration, construction sector and service economy. The hosting of the Organisation of African Unity summit in 1977 drove a first wave of prestige construction, including hotels, the Palais du Sénat and modernised boulevards. Light industry expanded after the 1967 opening of the Port-Gentil refinery, with Libreville becoming home to the country's principal breweries, flour mills, cement grinders, shipyards and textile-printing plants.

The completion of the Trans-Gabon Railway between Owendo and Franceville in 1986, combined with the inauguration of the deep-water port of Owendo, consolidated Libreville's position as the principal export outlet for manganese from Moanda, tropical timber and, from 2017, imported bulk cargoes.

Following the fall in oil prices in the mid-1980s, the 1994 devaluation of the CFA franc, and the progressive depletion of older fields, successive Gabonese governments have pursued policies aimed at diversifying the urban economy away from oil-rent dependence. The Plan Stratégique Gabon Émergent (Emerging Gabon Strategic Plan, 2010) placed Libreville and its suburbs at the centre of a new industrial-processing strategy, materialised in the 2010 ban on the export of unprocessed logs and the creation of the Nkok Special Economic Zone just inland from the capital.

=== Economic structure ===
==== Public administration and services ====
As Gabon's political capital, Libreville hosts the Presidential Palace, the National Assembly, the Senate, the Constitutional Court and nearly all central ministries, which collectively make the Gabonese state the single largest employer in the city. Public service, diplomacy and associated professional services (law, accountancy, consulting, private education and health care) constitute the core of the formal tertiary sector. The service and hospitality industries are also the principal absorbers of labour, in a country whose broader economy, despite relatively high GDP per capita, suffered from a national unemployment rate estimated at 21.5 per cent in 2022.

==== Port and maritime trade ====
The Libreville agglomeration contains three port facilities of national importance, all clustered around Owendo on the south-western shore of the Gabon Estuary. The historic Port of Owendo, located approximately 20 km from the city centre, handles containerised, general cargo and bulk traffic and has been the country's principal commercial harbour since the 1970s. Its legacy quays can handle vessels of up to 40,000 DWT with drafts of up to 11.5 m, and the complex handles on the order of 700 vessels and more than five million tonnes of cargo per year.

In the mid-2010s the complex was enlarged by two major greenfield facilities built under public–private partnership by Gabon Special Economic Zone Ports (GSEZ Ports), a joint venture between the Gabonese state, the Africa Finance Corporation and the Singaporean agribusiness group Olam International. The GSEZ Mineral Port, inaugurated in 2017, occupies 45 hectares of reclaimed land and was conceived as a dedicated bulk terminal primarily for manganese ore and timber exports. The adjacent New Owendo International Port (NOIP), a 164-hectare multipurpose facility with a nominal capacity of four million tonnes per year, was built in eighteen months at a cost of some US$500 million and entered service between 2017 and 2019. The port offers a 690-metre loading platform, five 10,500-tonne liquid-storage tanks, two 10,000-tonne grain silos and integrated rail, road and river connections.

A 2019 financing round led by the Emerging Africa Infrastructure Fund and the African Development Bank provided some €305 million in debt to expand capacity at the multipurpose terminal by an additional four million tonnes per year, while a container terminal joint venture between GSEZ Ports and the French logistics group Bolloré's local subsidiary STCG equipped the port for vessels of up to 6,000 TEU.

==== Timber and wood processing ====
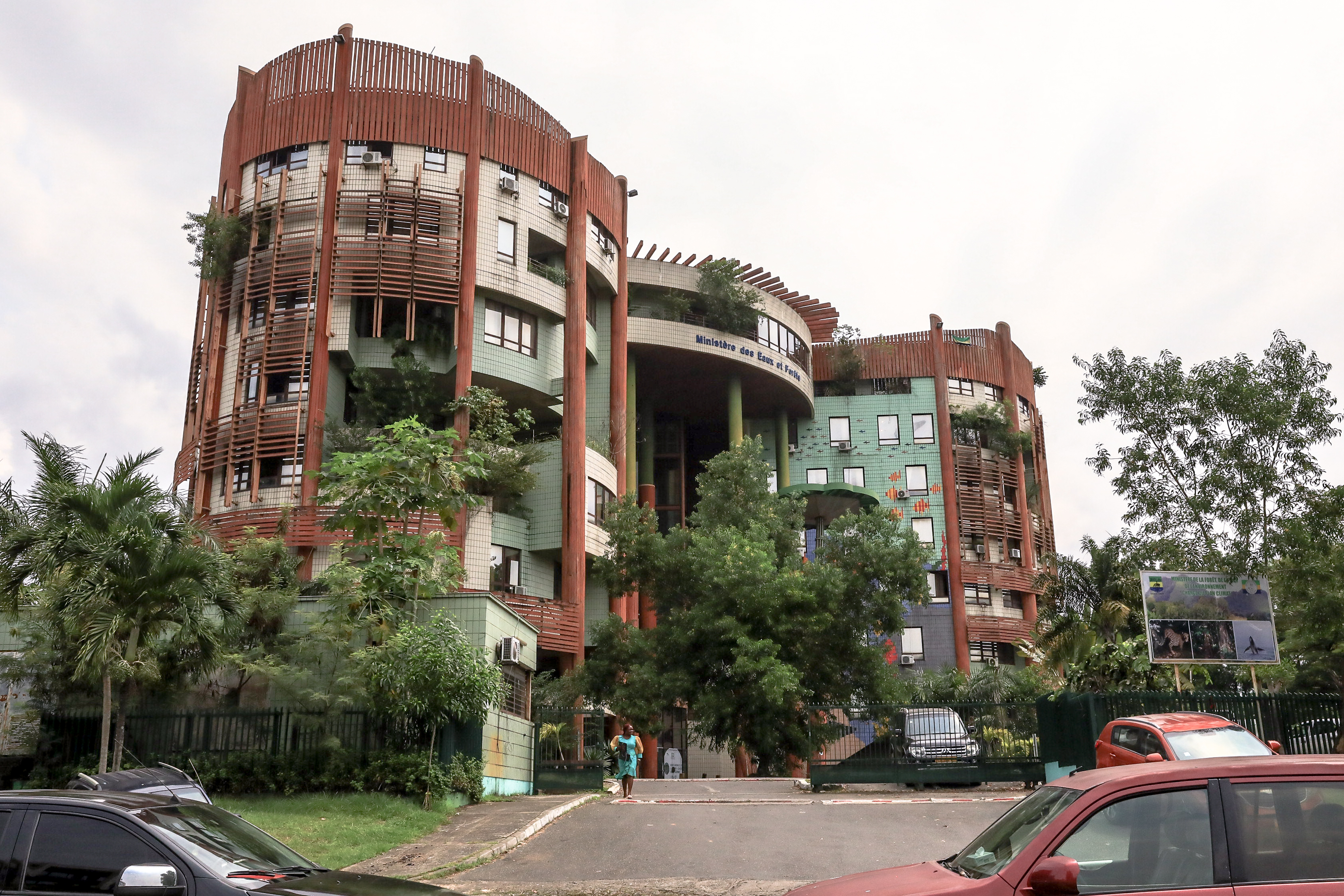
Gabon's Ministry of Water and Forests in Libreville

Timber has historically been Libreville's oldest export-oriented industry and, following the 2010 log-export ban, has undergone a comprehensive restructuring toward downstream processing within Gabon itself. The Nkok Special Economic Zone (SEZ), located 27 km east of the capital on the road to Kango, is the country's flagship industrial park. Developed from 2010 by Gabon Special Economic Zone SA, a public–private partnership between the Gabonese state, Olam International and the Africa Finance Corporation, the zone covers 1,126 hectares and provides a ten-year corporate-tax holiday followed by a flat 10 per cent rate, as well as integrated log-yard, kiln-drying, power and port-barge facilities.

As of the early 2020s the Nkok SEZ hosted 144 to 166 investors from some nineteen countries, of which approximately 84 operated in the wood cluster (sawmilling, veneer, plywood, furniture), alongside firms active in metallurgy, pharmaceuticals, plastic recycling and food processing. Total committed foreign direct investment approached US$1.7 billion. The cluster has made Gabon the world's second-largest exporter of veneer and Africa's largest, and the Nkok zone was ranked the world's best SEZ for timber production by the fDi Intelligence rankings in 2020. A secondary zone, GSEZ Ikolo (318 hectares of developed land), was launched in 2021 to extend industrial capacity closer to the Owendo port. Since October 2018 all logs entering the zone have been tracked by the independent Tracer-Nkok agency, created with the French forestry consultancy FRM and the Gabonese NGO Brainforest, with the aim of guaranteeing legality of supply.

Libreville and its immediate suburbs also host several independent sawmills and wood-products companies, including Gabon Wood Industries, operating a 24,000 m³ per year sawmill and a 12,000-container-per-year handling terminal.

==== Oil and gas downstream sector ====
Although virtually all of Gabon's crude oil is extracted offshore of Port-Gentil, Libreville is the country's principal market for refined products and hosts the administrative headquarters of several oil and service companies, including the state-owned Gabon Oil Company and the downstream retailer Gabon Oil Downstream. Power stations in the capital are among the largest domestic consumers of associated gas produced by Perenco.

The city is supplied with petroleum products chiefly by the Société Gabonaise de Raffinage (SOGARA) refinery at Port-Gentil, which processes approximately 1.2 million tonnes of Rabi Light crude per year and supplies butane, unleaded gasoline, Jet A1 fuel and diesel to the Libreville market. Periodic shortfalls in refinery output have led to recurring fuel shortages in the capital, as the route from Port-Gentil to Libreville relies on tanker shipments. Announced expansions of SOGARA capacity to 1.5 million tonnes per year, coupled with the construction of a new modularised hydrocracker, aim to triple the country's refining capacity by 2030 and to make Libreville self-sufficient in refined fuels.

==== Manufacturing and light industry ====
The Oloumi district of central Libreville and the Owendo industrial zone concentrate the bulk of the city's light and medium industry.

Manufacturing activities include:

- Cement: Owendo is the national centre of cement grinding. The Moroccan-owned Ciments de l'Afrique (CIMAF) Gabon operates a two-line grinding plant commissioned in 2015 and expanded in 2020; the complex has a total installed capacity of 1.85 million tonnes per year and directly employs about 650 people. A competing 1.1-million-tonne grinding facility built by Dangote Cement adjacent to the New Owendo International Port was commissioned in the early 2020s. Combined nominal capacity significantly exceeds domestic demand of roughly 600,000 to 700,000 tonnes per year, positioning Libreville as a regional clinker and cement distribution hub.
- Brewing and beverages: The Société des Brasseries du Gabon (SOBRAGA), founded in 1966 under the impetus of the French industrialist Pierre Castel and controlled by the Castel Group, operates its main brewery in the Owendo industrial zone. The company produces the national flagship beer Régab, brews Guinness and Doppel Munich under licence, and manufactures the D'jino and Vino Cola soft-drink brands. SOBRAGA employs approximately 2,000 people directly across its five national plants and supports a wholesaler-and-distributor network throughout the country.
- Shipbuilding and ship repair: Small and medium-sized yards along the Gabon Estuary service fishing vessels, coastal traders and the Gabonese Navy.
- Food processing: flour mills, cooking-oil refining (including palm oil from Olam's national plantations), sugar distribution and bottled water.
- Other activities include metalwork, plastic recycling, textile-printing, furniture manufacture, pharmaceutical compounding (largely at Nkok) and printing.

==== Banking and financial services ====
Libreville is the principal financial centre of the Economic and Monetary Community of Central Africa (CEMAC) sub-region after Douala. The city hosts the Gabonese country branch of the Bank of Central African States (BEAC), which issues the regional Central African CFA franc, along with the headquarters of a dozen commercial banks, insurance companies and microfinance institutions.

The most significant indigenous financial institution is BGFIBank Group, headquartered on the Boulevard de l'Indépendance in central Libreville. Tracing its origins to the 1971 creation of the Banque de Paris et des Pays-Bas Gabon (a joint venture with BNP), the bank adopted its current name in 1996 and is now a private multinational present in twelve countries across Central and West Africa, Madagascar and France, with more than 2,600 employees. BGFIBank's subsidiaries include the consumer-credit company Finatra, the stockbroking arm BGFIBourse (created in 2005), the real-estate developer Hédenia and the insurance firm Assinco. Libreville is also home to subsidiaries or branches of French and pan-African groups including Société Générale, UBA, Ecobank, Orabank and Citibank.

A regional stock exchange, the Bourse des Valeurs Mobilières de l'Afrique Centrale (BVMAC), has had its headquarters in Libreville since a 2019 merger of the Gabonese and Cameroonian regional exchanges, although trading volumes remain modest compared with those on the JSE or the NGX.

==== Retail, wholesale and informal commerce ====
The main commercial districts of Libreville are located in Mont-Bouët and Nombakélé, which together host the bulk of the city's formal retail outlets, supermarkets, wholesale importers and small shopping centres. The Marché du Mont-Bouët, Gabon's largest market, comprises several hundred stalls offering fresh produce, meat, fish, fabric, cosmetics, household goods and traditional medicines, and functions as a wholesale hub supplying smaller markets across the Estuaire Province. The adjacent Galerie Marchande Hassan Choucaire, established in the early 1990s, is widely described as the city's first modern commercial centre. Secondary markets include those of Nkembo, Louis and PK8.

The formal modern-retail segment is dominated by Lebanese- and French-owned hypermarkets and supermarkets (historically the Géant CKdo, Mbolo and Score chains), alongside smaller specialised outlets in the central business district around Boulevard de l'Indépendance. Petrol-station convenience retail is operated primarily by the French-controlled Total, Engen and Oryx networks, along with the state-linked Gabon Oil Marketing.

The informal sector nonetheless remains central to daily commerce in Libreville. According to the Gabonese Ministry of Finance, informal street trade generates several billion CFA francs per year and expanded sharply in the wake of the 1994 CFA franc devaluation and successive oil-price downturns. Street vendors operate alongside most government buildings, and municipal "hunts" by the local police against street trading have proved largely ineffective, with many civil servants themselves among their principal customers. The International Labour Organization estimates that informal employment accounts for around 85 per cent of all jobs in sub-Saharan Africa, and observers note a comparable, though lower, prevalence in Libreville.

==== Construction and real estate ====
Libreville's construction sector is one of the most dynamic in Central Africa. Annual housing demand is estimated at 3–5 per cent growth, and the city faces a long-standing housing deficit put at some 200,000 units. Average residential prices in Libreville were reported at around US$1,200 per square metre in late 2025, with annual price growth of 3–4 per cent, and rental yields between 5–7 per cent for central apartments and 4–6 per cent for suburban houses.

Since the late 2000s the Gabonese state has sought to narrow the housing gap through public–private partnerships, committing to a target of 6,000 social-housing units by 2026 under a CFA 111 billion (around US$181 million) programme, and has contracted international prefabrication specialists such as the Turkish firm Dorçe, which delivered 600 turnkey units in Libreville in 2024–2025. Construction is further stimulated by the Libreville 2 satellite-city project, launched in April 2024.

The flagship urban-renewal project is the Baie des Rois (Bay of Kings), a 40-hectare waterfront redevelopment on the Champ Triomphal managed by Façade Maritime du Champ Triomphal (FMCT), a subsidiary of the Fonds Gabonais d'Investissements Stratégiques (FGIS). First conceived in 1997 and accelerated from 2013, the project is intended to deliver more than 360,000 m² of new offices, residential units, commercial spaces, hotels and a conference centre by 2035, and is projected to generate up to 20,000 jobs. The site hosts Central Africa's first EDGE-certified building and is planned as a "15-minute city" with a ban on single-use plastics. Within the development, the 50-storey Tour du Futur (Libreville Tower), developed by Turkey's FB Group for government offices and presidential services, began construction in 2024 and is scheduled for completion in early 2027; it is designed to be the tallest building in Gabon.

Construction inputs remain largely imported: despite high domestic cement capacity, some 90 per cent of other building materials are sourced from Europe and China, making costs highly sensitive to currency movements and shipping conditions.

==== Tourism and hospitality ====
Although Gabon as a whole receives comparatively few international visitors relative to its regional peers, Libreville accounts for the majority of the country's business-tourism and MICE activity. The city hosts a mid-range and upscale hotel inventory anchored by the Radisson Blu Okoume Palace and Park Inn by Radisson, the Hilton Libreville, Nomad Suites, the locally operated Hôtel Onomo and a growing number of boutique and serviced-apartment properties. Seafood restaurants along the Boulevard du Bord de Mer and around the Pointe Denis ferry terminal form a distinct hospitality cluster, sustained by daily landings from artisanal fishers. The nightlife and entertainment economy is concentrated in the Quartier Louis district.

Government strategy has increasingly sought to position the Libreville region as a gateway for Gabon's ecotourism offer, drawing on Akanda National Park to the north and Pongara National Park across the Gabon Estuary, and on cruise-ship visits calling at the deep-water quays of Owendo.

==== Telecommunications ====
Libreville is the national hub of Gabon's telecommunications market, which is regulated by the Autorité de Régulation des Communications Électroniques et des Postes (ARCEP). The two principal operators, both headquartered in the city, are Moov Africa Gabon Telecom (a subsidiary of Maroc Telecom, formed by the 2016 merger of Gabon Telecom and Moov Gabon) and Airtel Gabon (part of the Indian Bharti Airtel group). In September 2025 the two firms signed a memorandum of understanding to share mobile infrastructure in order to expand 4G coverage and rationalise the number of towers in urban Libreville. Preparatory work for the commercial launch of 5G services in Libreville was under way in late 2025.

International bandwidth reaches the city via the SAT-3/WASC and ACE submarine cables landing at Sette Cama, with fibre backhaul to Libreville operated principally by Gabon Telecom. Mobile money services (Airtel Money, Moov Money) have become an important component of the urban payments mix.

==== Fisheries ====
The Gabon Estuary and adjacent Atlantic waters support a dual fishing industry: an artisanal fleet of pirogues and small motorised vessels landing tilapia, barracuda, bonga and shrimp at Port Môle and at smaller beach landings along the Libreville waterfront; and an industrial fleet targeting tuna and sardine species in Gabon's 200-mile exclusive economic zone. National waters are expected to yield an annual potential of around 15,000 tonnes of tuna and 12,000 tonnes of sardines, with total catch recently exceeding 47,000 tonnes, 80 per cent of it from the Atlantic. To combat illegal, unreported and unregulated fishing and improve traceability of landings, the Gabonese government in the early 2020s deployed the NEMO satellite-beacon system on the artisanal fleet based in Libreville. Fish-processing plants, including canneries and cold-storage facilities, are concentrated at Owendo.

=== Transport infrastructure and logistics ===
==== Trans-Gabon Railway ====
Libreville is the western terminus of the Trans-Gabon Railway (Transgabonais), a 669–670 km standard gauge single-track line linking the port of Owendo to Franceville via Ndjolé, Lopé, Booué, Lastoursville and Moanda. Opened in stages between 1978 and 1986 at a cost that nearly bankrupted the state, the line is operated under concession since 2005 by Société d'Exploitation du Transgabonais (SETRAG), a subsidiary of the manganese producer COMILOG (itself part of the French group Eramet).

Although legally a mixed passenger–freight line, the Transgabonais is in economic practice a dedicated mineral and timber export corridor: in 2022 it handled approximately 10.9 million tonnes of freight, the bulk of it manganese ore from the Moanda region destined for export via Owendo, followed by timber, refined petroleum products and general cargo. An IFC-supported €315 million rehabilitation programme (PRN1) renewed 300 km of track and 225 km of new rail between 2015 and 2022, and a follow-on plan (PRN2), adopted with the investment fund Meridiam, targets capacity of 19 million tonnes per year. In 2023, Fortescue signed an agreement to haul iron ore from the Belinga deposit to Owendo by combined road–rail, initially at around two million tonnes per year.

==== Léon-Mba International Airport ====
Léon-Mba International Airport, located approximately 11 km north-west of the city centre and adjoining the Atlantic seafront, is Gabon's only airport with scheduled international services and its busiest aviation facility. Passenger traffic reached approximately 700,000 in 2019 and recovered to 939,521 in 2023, against a nominal capacity of 1.2 million passengers per year after the modernisation of Terminal 1.

The airport's concession was transferred in October 2018 to GSEZ-Airport, a public–private partnership involving the Gabonese state, the Africa Finance Corporation and Olam International, which has led subsequent upgrades to baggage-handling, security and passenger-information systems. Major carriers serving the airport include Air France (to Paris Charles de Gaulle), Ethiopian Airlines, Turkish Airlines, Royal Air Maroc, ASKY Airlines and Afrijet, the latter headquartered in Libreville and operating domestic and regional routes from a dedicated Terminal 2. The airport is also the historical base of the country's national carrier, the successive Air Gabon and Gabon Airlines.

==== Road network ====
Libreville is the starting point of Gabon's two principal trunk roads: the Route Nationale 1 (RN1), linking the capital to Bifoun and onward to Lambaréné and the interior, and the coastal connection to Cap Estérias and the Equatorial Guinean border. Urban traffic is dominated by privately operated shared-taxis — nationally colour-coded by department, red in Libreville — and by minibus services (clandos). Chronic congestion on the roads connecting the city to Owendo is a long-standing constraint on freight logistics.

=== Labour market ===
The Gabonese state remains the single largest employer in Libreville, both directly (civil service, security and armed forces, health and education) and indirectly through state-owned or partly state-owned companies such as the national oil company, SETRAG, SEEG (water and electricity) and SOGARA. The civil service has historically functioned as an informal employer of last resort for educated Gabonese.

Private-sector formal employment is concentrated in the oil-services subsidiaries (many of them headquartered in Libreville but operating on Port-Gentil fields), the port and logistics operators at Owendo (GSEZ Ports, STCG, Bolloré, shipping agents), cement producers, SOBRAGA, banking and telecommunications. Nkok SEZ alone is reported to support several thousand direct industrial jobs across its wood-processing cluster. The hospitality, retail and construction sectors absorb much of the rest of formal employment; domestic service is a significant employer among lower-skilled urban migrants, particularly women.

National unemployment was estimated at around 21.5 per cent in 2022, with youth unemployment substantially higher and much of the shortfall absorbed into the informal economy of Libreville. Skilled-labour shortages have historically been met through both regional migration from Cameroon, Equatorial Guinea, Senegal and Mali, and from a small but visible expatriate community of French, Lebanese, Moroccan, Chinese, Indian and other nationals employed in oil services, construction, finance, retail and the diplomatic corps.

=== Cost of living and social indicators ===
Libreville is consistently ranked among the most expensive cities in sub-Saharan Africa. In the October 2025 Xpatulator survey, Libreville was ranked the most expensive city in Africa for expatriates, with a cost-of-living index of 88.1 (New York = 100), ahead of Accra, Monrovia and Abidjan. The price premium reflects the country's high dependence on imports for food, consumer goods and construction materials, the narrow local manufacturing base outside cement and beverages, heavy excise duties on alcohol and tobacco, and high housing costs in the few neighbourhoods considered secure by international corporate standards.

These costs co-exist with widespread poverty among Gabonese nationals. A Gini coefficient exceeding 38 nationally is reflected in the city in the juxtaposition of affluent oceanfront districts such as Batterie IV and the Sablière with peripheral informal settlements in areas like the Matitis and the hinterland of PK8–PK12, where water, sewerage and paved-road coverage is incomplete.

=== Foreign presence ===
==== French economic and military footprint ====
France has been the principal foreign economic partner of Libreville since independence. French companies dominate several strategic sectors: TotalEnergies (petroleum retail and a historical stake in upstream production), Eramet (via COMILOG and SETRAG), Bolloré (terminal operations, logistics and media), Castel Group (SOBRAGA), BNP Paribas (founding partner of BGFI) and Compagnie fruitière and other French-owned food wholesalers.

From 1975 until 2025, Libreville hosted the French Army's 6th Marine Infantry Battalion (6e BIMa) at Camp de Gaulle, close to Léon-Mba International Airport, which for decades provided a significant source of rental demand, procurement spending and local employment in Libreville. French troop numbers in the country peaked at around 1,200 in the mid-2010s. Following the 2023 Gabonese coup d'état and the broader re-negotiation of French military cooperation in Africa, the base was converted in 2025 into a jointly run regional training academy (Académie militaire), with the French contingent reduced to about 200 personnel focused on instructor roles. The facility now hosts the Libreville Defence Forces Administration School (EAFDL) and a planned Academy for the Protection of the Environment and Natural Resources, and is intended to become a sub-regional training hub for the Economic Community of Central African States.

==== Other foreign investment ====
Non-French foreign direct investment in Libreville has grown rapidly since 2010, with significant inflows from Morocco (CIMAF, Maroc Telecom), Singapore and Nigeria (via Olam and the Africa Finance Corporation), India (BGFI's Indian partners, Dangote Cement contractors, the Indian-owned Nouvelle Gabon Mining manganese producer), China (construction, telecommunications equipment, port contracts), Turkey (FB Group, Dorçe) and the Gulf states. This diversification reflects a conscious policy of broadening the country's partnership base beyond the traditional French sphere.

=== Challenges and outlook ===
The economy of Libreville continues to face a series of structural challenges. Its prosperity remains closely correlated with world oil prices, despite the fact that the city is not itself a petroleum-producing centre; downturns in crude prices have historically triggered fiscal retrenchment, arrears in civil-servant salaries, and cascading effects in construction, retail and real estate. The Bank of Central African States's rate cuts in 2025 and rising public investment under the post-coup transitional authorities have partially stimulated urban credit, but private-sector credit penetration remains shallow and mortgage finance almost non-existent.

Other persistent constraints include:

- An electricity-generation shortfall that required the construction of a dedicated 70 MW plant near Libreville to supply Nkok SEZ, and which continues to limit heavy-industry expansion;
- Congestion and limited multimodal capacity on the Libreville–Owendo corridor, partly addressed by the PRN rail-rehabilitation programme and port expansions;
- A housing deficit estimated at 200,000 units and unplanned peri-urban sprawl;
- A narrow formal tax base and a high proportion of informal employment;
- The relatively small size of the Gabonese domestic market, which limits the scale of manufacturing outside export-oriented processing in the Nkok SEZ.

Government strategy, articulated in the Plan Stratégique Gabon Émergent and its successor instruments, continues to prioritise the transformation of Libreville into a regional logistics, industrial-processing and tertiary-services hub for Central Africa, leveraging the city's port, rail, air and SEZ infrastructure, its relative political stability, and its position as the largest francophone market on the Gulf of Guinea between Douala and Pointe-Noire.

== Notable residents ==
- Nadège Noële Ango-Obiang, writer and economist
- Pierre-Emerick Aubameyang, footballer who plays for Marseille and the Gabon National Football Team
- Peggy Lucie Auleley, writer
- Daniel Cousin, footballer who played for AEL and the Gabon National Team
- Marcel Lefebvre, traditionalist Roman Catholic bishop, served as a missionary in Libreville
- Léon M'ba, first Prime Minister and first President of Gabon
- Anthony Obame, Olympic silver medalist in the men's Taekwondo 80+ kg at the 2012 Summer Olympics.
- Simone Saint-Dénis, trade union leader
- Chris Silva (born 1996), professional basketball player in the Israeli Basketball Premier League
- Charles Tchen, Honorary consul for the Kingdom of the Netherlands in Gabon
