= List of Senegalese writers =

This is a list of prominent Senegalese authors (by surname)

== A - G ==
- Agbo, Berte-Evelyne, poet, also connected with Benin
- Bâ, Mariama (1929–1981), French-language novelist
- Barry, Kesso (1948– ), autobiographer born in Guinea
- Barry, Mariama, French-language autobiographical novelist
- Benga, Sokhna (1967– ), novelist and poet
- Bocoum, Jacqueline Fatima, former journalist turned author and programme director
- Bugul, Ken (1948– ), autobiographical writer and novelist
- Cisse, Mamadou (1956– )
- Diakhate, Lamine (1928–1987), poet and novelist
- Diallo, Nafissatou Niang (1941–1982), autobiographer, novelist and children's writer
- Dieng, Mame Younousse, novelist in French and Wolof
- Aminata Sophie Dièye (1973–2016), journalist, novelist and playwright
- Babacar Sedikh Diouf (1928– ), historian, author and intellectual
- Diouf, Nafissatou Dia (1973– ), novelist and children's writer,
- Diouf, Sylviane, historian and lecturer
- Diome, Fatou (1968– ), novelist
- Diop, Alioune (1910–1980), essayist and intellectual
- Diop, Birago (1906–1989), French-language folklorist, poet and autobiographer
- Diop, Boubacar Boris (1946– ), novelist
- Diop, Cheikh Anta (1923–1986), Afrocentric historian and anthropologist
- Diop, David (1927–1960), poet
- Dogbeh, Richard, also connected with Benin, Togo and Côte d'Ivoire (1932–2003)
- Fall, Khadi (1948– ), poet
- Fall, Kiné Kirama (1934– ), poet
- Fall, Malick (1920–1978), French-language novelist and poet
- Faye, Louis Diène (1936– ), anthropologist and scholar of Serer religion, history and culture
- Gnimagnon, Christine Adjahi (1945– ), also connected with Benin

== H - O ==
- Hane, Khadidjatou (Khady) (1962– )
- Joof, Tamsier (1973– )
- Ka, Aminata Maïga (1940–2005), French-language novelist
- Kane, Cheikh Hamidou (1928– ), French-language novelist
- Kane, Ndèye Fatou (1986– ), Senegalese novelist and feminist, granddaughter of Cheikh Hamidou Kane
- Mbaye, Annette (d'Erneville) (1926– )
- Amina Sow Mbaye (1937– ) French-language poet and novelist
- Mordasini, Diana
- Ndao, Cheikh Aliou (1933– ), novelist, playwright and poet
- Adja Ndèye Boury Ndiaye (1936– ), novelist
- Ndiaye, Marie, born in France (1967– ), novelist
- Ndoye, Mariama (1953– ), novelist, short story writer and children's writer
- Niane, Djibril Tamsir (1932–2021), novelist and historian
- Niang, Mame Bassine (1951–2013), writer and lawyer
- Niang, Fatou Siga (1932–2022)

== P - Z ==
- Sadji, Abdoulaye (1910–1961), novelist and children's writer
- Sall, Amadou Lamine (1951– ), poet
- Sall, Ibrahima (1949– ), novelist, poet, playwright and short story writer
- Sarr, Alioune (1908–2001), historian and politician, scholar of Serer history
- Seek, Alioune Badara (1945– ), novelist
- Sembène, Ousmane (1923–2007), writer and filmmaker
- Sène, Fama Diagne (1969– ), novelist and playwright
- Senghor, Léopold Sédar (1906–2001), poet and politician
- Catherine Shan (1952–2018), French language novelist and film director
- Ousmane Socé (1911–1973), French-language novelist
- Sow, Fatou Ndiaye (1956–2004)
- Sow Fall, Aminata (1941– ), novelist
- Sylla, Khady (1963–2013)
- Thiaw, Issa Laye (1943–2017), historian, theologian and scholar of Serer religion and history
- Rama Thiaw (1978– ), filmmaker, screenwriter
- Traoré, Abibatou (1973– )
- Vieyra, Myriam Warner (1939–2017), novelist born in Guadeloupe

== See also ==
- List of Senegalese
- List of Gambian writers
- List of African writers by country
