= Pitzer =

Pitzer is a surname, and may refer to:

- Alexander White Pitzer (1834–1927), American Presbyterian clergyman
- Gys Pitzer (1939–2025), South African rugby union player
- Kenneth Sanborn Pitzer (1914–1997), American theoretical chemist
- Russell Kelly Pitzer (1878–1978), American businessman and philanthropist
- Russell Mosher Pitzer (1938–), American theoretical chemist
- William Bruce Pitzer (1917–1966), American Naval officer

== See also ==
- Pitzer College, liberal arts college located in Claremont, California, United States, named after Russell K. Pitzer
- Pitzer equations, thermodynamic equations named after Kenneth S. Pitzer
