= Angrand =

Angrand is a surname. Notable people with the surname include:

- Armand-Pierre Angrand (1892–1964), Senegalese politician and writer
- Charles Angrand (1854–1926), French artist
- Léonce Angrand (1808–1886), French painter and draughtsman
- Léopold Angrand (1859–1906), Senegalese politician
