= Russell Pitzer =

Russell Pitzer may refer to:

- Russell K. Pitzer (1878–1978), American orange grower and philanthropist
- Russell M. Pitzer (born 1938), American theoretical chemist and educator
