= Pitzen =

Pitzen is a surname. Notable people with the surname include:

- Marianne Pitzen (born 1948), German artist
- Timmothy Pitzen (born 2004), six-year-old boy who disappeared in 2011

== See also ==
- Pitzer
