= Birago Diop =

Senegalese veterinarian, folklorist, diplomat, and writer (1906-1989)

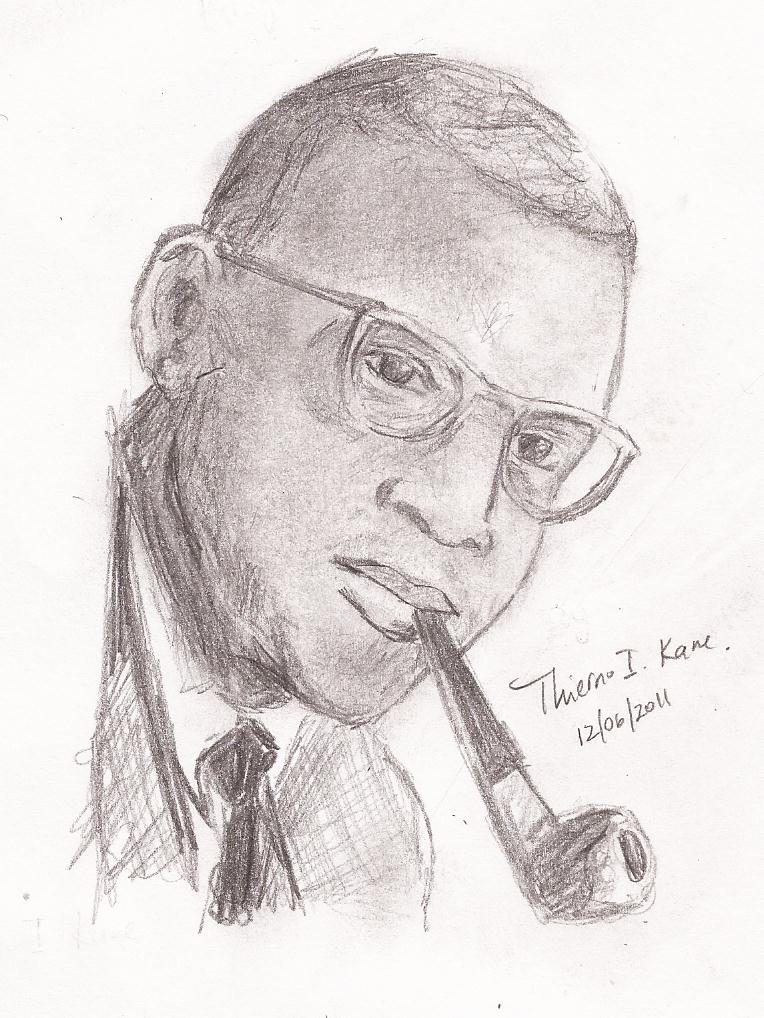
- Sketch of Birago Diop

Background information
- Born: Birago Ismaël Diop; 11 December 1906; Ouakam, Dakar, Senegal, French West Africa
- Origin: Wolof
- Died: 25 November 1989 (aged 82); Dakar, Senegal
- Occupations: Poet, storyteller, veterinarian, diplomat

Birago Ismaël Diop (11 December 1906 – 25 November 1989) was a Senegalese poet, storyteller, veterinarian, and diplomat whose work restored general interest in African folktales and was a major contribution to the Négritude literary movement.

== Early life ==
Son of Ismaël Diop and Sokhna (Diawara), Birago Diop was born in Ouakam, a neighborhood in Dakar, Senegal. His mother, aunt and extended family raised him with his two older brothers, Massyla (a writer) and Youssoupha; his father had disappeared, possibly dead, two months before Diop was born. Diop's brothers exposed him to folktales and literary culture.

In 1920, Diop earned a scholarship to attend the French-speaking school Lycée Faidherbe in Saint-Louis, which was then Senegal's capital. During this time, he became fascinated with the poems and style of writing of Victor Hugo, Charles Baudelaire, Edgar Allan Poe and several others and began writing his own. In the late 1920s, he served as a nurse in a Saint-Louis military hospital and in 1928 went on to study veterinary medicine at the University of Toulouse in France, graduating in 1933.

== Career ==
=== Early career ===
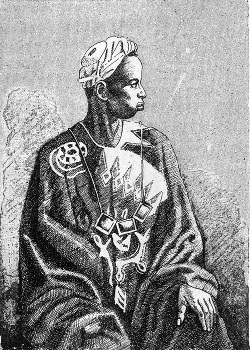
West African Story teller, or Griot

After graduating, Diop spent several months as an intern in Alfort working at the Institute for Exotic Veterinary Medicine. During this time he met numerous African, African-American and Caribbean students, intellectuals, artists and poets in the Négritude movement, among them Léopold Sédar Senghor, Aimé Césaire and Léon Damas. One of his first publications was "Kotje Barma ou les Toupets Apophtegmes", which appeared in L'Étudiant noir.

Diop married a French accountant, Marie-Louise Pradère (with whom he had two children, Renée and Andrée), and returned to Africa in 1934, where he worked as a veterinary surgeon for the French colonial government in the French Sudan (now Mali) in two periods, 1934–37 and 1937–42.

It was in the late 1930s, during his work as the head of the government's cattle-inspection service for several regions in Senegal and Mali, that Diop met a number of storytellers, including the Wolof griot Amadou Koumba. Many of his poems and tales have their roots in the oral African traditions that he encountered during his childhood and in this period of his life.

=== During and after World War II ===
In 1942, during World War II, Diop returned to France for two years, working again at the Institute for Exotic Veterinary Medicine, and he reconnected with the friends he had made during his previous time in France. Encouraged by Léon Damas, he published "Un jugement" in La Revue du Monde as well as a version of "Sarzan", and began to write the other tales that would be included in Tales of Amadou Koumba.

The following excerpt illustrating his homesickness can be found in "The Humps":

"Here, far from my home in Senegal, my eyes are surrounded by closed horizons. When the greens of summer and the russets of autumn have passed, I seek the vast expanses of the Savannah, and find only bare mountains, sombre as ancient prostrate giants that the snow refuses to bury because of their misdeed...." (from "The Humps").

After Diop returned to Africa in 1944, he served as a director of zoological technical services in Ivory Coast and Upper Volta (modern day Burkina Faso) between 1946 and 1950. Between 1950 and 1954, he worked in Mauritania.

His first collection of tales, Tales of Amadou Koumba, was published by Damas through Fasquelle in 1947. In 1950, he was awarded the Grand Prix littéraire de l'Afrique occidentale française along with Ousmane Socé Diop. In 1958, he published a second volume of tales, Les Nouveaux Contes d'Amadou Koumba, which was followed by a third, Contes et Lavanes, in 1963. Contes et Lavanes earned him the Grand prix littéraire d'Afrique noire in 1964. Diop later acknowledged that the tales were drawn from a number of storytellers he had met, not only Amadou Koumba. These tales provided a combination of humor, fantasy and realism where people, supernatural beings, and animals interacted.

=== "The broken pen" ===
After Senegal gained its independence, Diop was nominated as the first Senegalese ambassador in Tunisia in 1961. Upon accepting this position, he stated that he had "broken his pen" ("cassé sa plume"), suggesting that he had stopped writing. In 1964, however, he returned to Dakar, opened a veterinary clinic and continued to be involved in literary activities, such as publishing in the women's magazine Awa, and adapting his story "L'Os" into a play, L'Os de Mor Lam. These were followed by five volumes of memoirs between 1978 and 1989: La Plume raboutée (1978), À Rebrousse-temps (1982), À Rebrousse-gens (1985), and Du temps de...(1986), and Et les yeux pour me dire (1989).

== Death ==
Birago Diop died on 25 November 1989 in Dakar at the age of 82.

== List of works ==
=== Narrative ===
- Tales of Amadou Koumba (Les Contes d'Amadou Koumba, 1947)
- New Tales of Amadou Koumba (Les Nouveaux Contes d'Amadou Koumba, 1958)
- Tales and Commentaries (Contes et Lavanes, 1963)

=== Poetry ===
- Lures and Glimmers (Leurres et Lueurs, 1960). Poems written between 1925 and 1945.

=== Drama ===
- L'Os de Mor Lam (1977). Adaptation of the story "L'Os".

=== Memoirs ===
- La Plume raboutée (1978)
- À Rebrousse-temps (1982)
- À Rebrousse-gens : epissures, entrelacs, et reliefs (1985)
- Du temps de... (1986)
- Et les yeux pour me dire (1989)

=== Compilations in French ===
- Contes Choisis, ed. Joyce A. Hutchinson (Cambridge University Press, 1967). Selected tales from Les contes d'Amadou Koumba and Les nouveaux contes d'Amadou Koumba.
- Contes d'Awa (1977). Pieces published in issues of Awa magazine in 1964–66 and 1972–73.

=== Compilations in English ===
- Tales of Amadou Koumba, trans. Dorothy S. Blair (Oxford University Press, 1966). Selection of tales from Les Contes d'Amadou Koumba and Les Nouveaux Contes d'Amadou Koumba.

== Awards and honours ==
- 1950: Grand Prix littéraire de l'Afrique occidentale française for Les Contes d'Amadou Koumba
- 1964: Grand prix littéraire d'Afrique noire for Contes et Lavanes
- Officier de la Légion d'Honneur
- Chevalier de l'Étoile Noire
- Chevalier du Mérite Agricole

== See also ==
- List of Senegalese writers
