= International Association of Women's Museums =

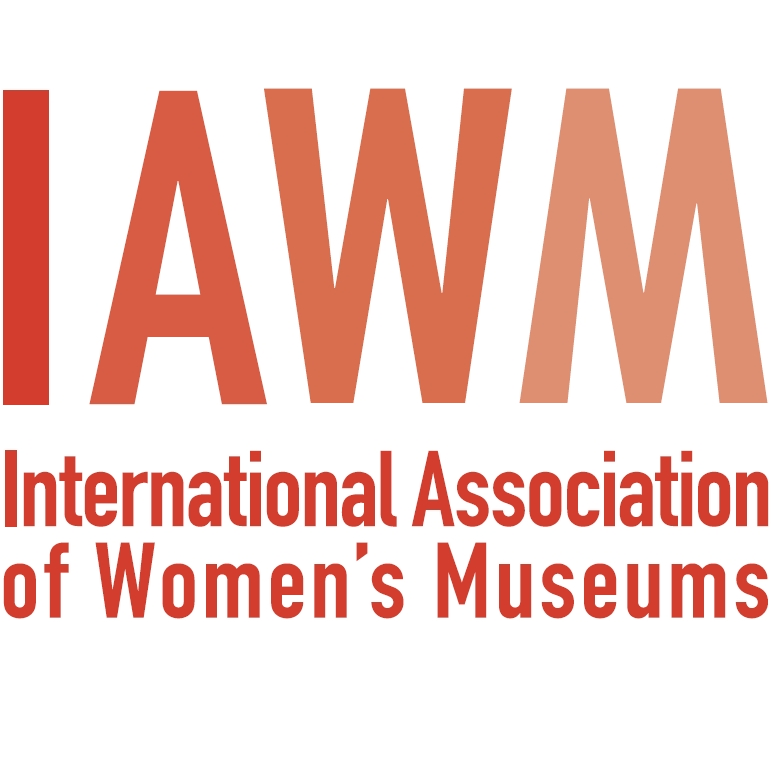
International Association of Women's Museums

The International Association of Women's Museums (IAWM) is an organisation with its foundation office in Bonn (Germany) and its administrative office in Merano (Italy). The network was founded in 2008 in Merano and transformed into an association in Alice Springs (Australia) in 2012. It has the goal to connect women's museums worldwide and to advocate for their interests.

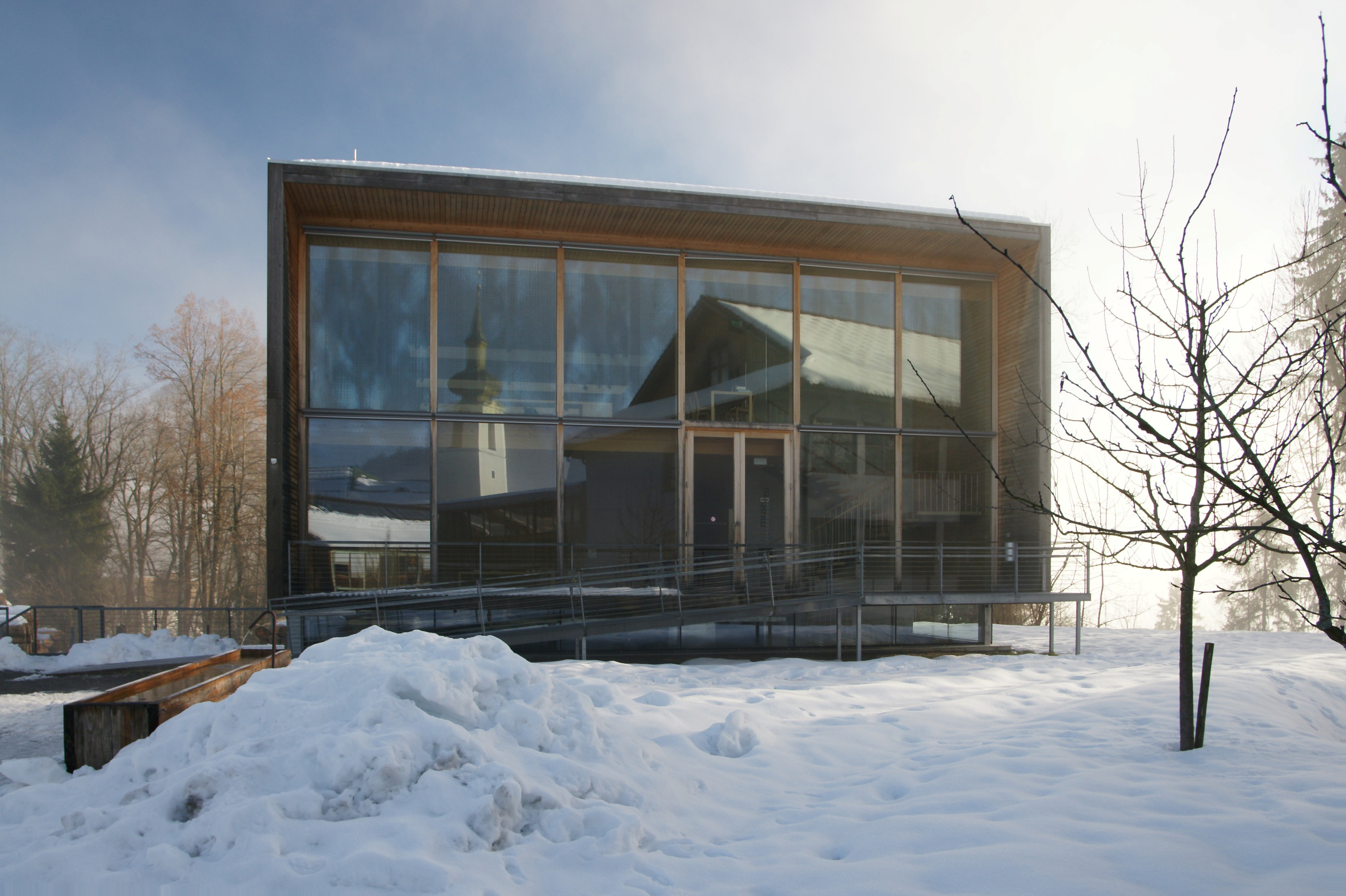
Hittisau Women's Museum in Vorarlberg (Austria)

IAWM is led by six board members from different continents. The chairwoman is currently Mona Holm from Norway and the coordinator of the network is Astrid Schönweger from Italy.

== Goals ==
IAWM's goal is to promote culture, arts, education and training from a gender perspective. Furthermore, the association wants to foster exchange, networking, mutual support and global cooperation among Women's Museums. Conducting research and the development of projects, exhibitions, new initiatives, community activities, seminars and conferences is another goal. IAWM is also working to promote and strengthen the acceptance of women's museums, to promote their global cooperation and mutual support, and to achieve international recognition in the world of museums. The membership of women's and gender museums worldwide and is advocating for women's rights and a gender-democratic society.

The association works as juncture network and as a central contact point for mediation for women's museums and initiatives. It monitors women's museums and initiatives worldwide.

== Activities of IAWM ==
Monitoring

- The association provides a database of women's museums worldwide and
- promotes and disseminates activities and exhibitions of women's museums.

Networking

- IAWM regularly organizes international congresses and
- reaches out to other networks for collaboration

Cooperating

- The network brings together women's museums for cooperation and collective projects, such as the EU-project She Culture;
- it promotes exchange and cooperation with other women's or gender and museum networks.

== History of women's museums ==
Today women's museums exist on every continent. They have originated mostly independently from each other. Women's museums of the US and Europe have their origin in the period of the second-wave feminism and its new understanding of history as gender history. Likewise, the museums of other continents have their roots in modern feminism. They want to provide insight into female history, culture or art to an interested public.

Women's museums are important for women's education, empowerment, and self-confidence. They provide awareness training, possibilities for independent actions, and tools to overcome discrimination.

== History of IAWM ==
The association IAWM emerged from the Network of Women's Museums, which was founded in Merano, Italy in 2008. The Women's Museum in Merano and Senegal organised the first congress, where 25 women's museums from all five continents joined for a meeting. The Iranian Nobel Peace Prize Winner (2003) Shirin Ebadi was invited to take over the role of the godmother of the congress and thereafter, she became the permanent godmother of the network. She said, "The women are the ones who write the history of the world! There has to be a women's museum in every country of the world!" This quote became the motto of the network.

Finally, the association was founded at the 4th International Congress Of Women's Museums in Alice Springs, Australia in 2012.

Since then, international congresses take place every four years and, if desired, continental congresses are organised in between.

== Conferences of the Network of Women's Museums and IAWM ==
- June 2008 1st International Congress of Women's Museums in Merano, Italy
- July 2009 2nd International Congress in Bonn, Germany
- May 2010 3rd International Congress in Buenos Aires, Argentina
- October 2011: 1st European Congress in Berlin, Germany
- May 2012: 4th International Congress in Alice Springs, Australia
- October 2013: 2nd European Congress in Berlin, Germany
- November 2014: 3rd European Congress in Bonn, Germany
- November 2016: 5th International Congress, Mexico City, Mexico
- October 2018: 4th European and 1st European-Asian Congress, Istanbul, Turkey
- July 2020: 6th International Congress, Hittisau, Austria

== See also ==
- Women's museum Hittisau, Austria
- Women's museum Aarhus, Denmark
- Women's museum Bonn, Germany
- Women's museum Merano, Italy
- Women's museum Gorée, Senegal
- Women's museum Istanbul, Turkey
- Women's museum Dallas, USA
- Women's museum Fort Lee, USA
- Women's museum San Francisco, USA
- Women's museum Washington, USA
- Women's museum Hanoi, Vietnam
- GenderMuseum in Kharkiv, Ukraine
