= Barbara Strasen =

American artist

Barbara Strasen (born Barbara Ehrlich, August 12, 1943) is an American artist who works with painting, photography, digital technologies and installations. She is known for her use of layers and layering techniques. She has exhibited widely in galleries and museums, nationally and internationally. In 2015 she had a major retrospective at the Long Beach Museum of Art.

== Early life and education ==
Barbara Ehrlich was born in Brooklyn, New York. She attended Great Neck North High School. In 1960, she left New York to major in art at Carnegie-Mellon University in Pittsburgh, PA. There, she studied with Robert Lepper, whose teaching on semiotics had a profound effect on the artist. She received a fellowship to attend the Yale Summer School of Art (1962). She was awarded a BFA in 1963. The following year, she married Stephen Strasen, a mathematician, who later became a computer software developer. She went on to graduate study in painting with Hassel Smith and Elmer Bischoff at the University of California, Berkeley, earning an MFA in 1965.

== Career ==
After graduate school, Strasen began a kind of hybrid form of imagemaking, often combining painting with painted cutouts, to which she has cycled back often during her career. The young artist soon exhibited at San Francisco's influential Dilexi Gallery directed by Jim Newman. Strasen began teaching on the college level at a number of California institutions, including the University of California, San Diego, and the Richmond Art Center.

In 1975 her work was included in the Whitney Museum’s Biennial. This was followed by exhibitions at venues such as the Santa Barbara Museum, and Louis K. Meisel (Note: ”Barbara Strasen,” Louis K. Meisel Gallery, New York, NY, 1977) and Parsons/Dreyfuss (Note: ”Seascape/Landscape,” Parsons-Dreyfuss Gallery, New York, NY, 1977) galleries in New York City. In 1980, Strasen included some of these as an individual project installation at P.S.1 in Queens, (Note: ”Ecosystem Allegories,” Individual Project Installation, P.S. 1, New York, NY, 1980) and a solo exhibition at the San Diego Natural History Museum. (Note: ”Marine Metaphors: The Ocean Dioramas of Barbara Strasen,” San Diego Natural History Museum, San Diego, CA, 1982)

In the decade that followed, she continued her focus on the natural world with a series about the desert. Her work was beginning to be shown in venues worldwide, including the Museu de Arte Contemporânea in Brazil, (Note: ”U.S.A. Women Artists,” Museu de Arte Contemporânea da Universidade, Sao Paulo, Brazil, 1980) La Chambre Blanche in Quebec, (Note: "Barbara Strasen," La Chambre Blanche, Quebec City, Canada, 1984) Steirischer Herbst in Austria, (Note: "Animal Art: The Animal as a Conveyor and Medium of Art," Steirischer Herbst, Graz, Austria, 1987) the Fisher Art Museum in Los Angeles and AIR Gallery in New York City. (Note: "Choice: Four Artists," and "Internal/External: Works by Barbara Strasen," A.I.R. Gallery, New York, NY, 1982 and 1983)

The next ten years saw Strasen moving her focus to finding connections between contemporary and ancient forms. Exhibitions were mounted at Grey Art Gallery (Note: "Now and Then," Grey Art Gallery, New York University, New York, NY, 1990) and the Islip Art Museum in New York, (Note: "Contemporary Bestiary," Islip Art Museum, Islip, NY, 1990) Het Apollohuis in the Netherlands, Budapest Galerie in Hungary, (Note: "Layers Of Perception," Budapest Galerie, Budapest, Hungary,1998) Frauenmuseum in Germany, (Note: "Brust-Lust-Frust, Frauen Museum, Bonn, Germany, 1999) Galeria Soloblu in Milan (Note: "Barbara Strasen," Galeria Soloblu, Milan, Italy, 1998) and the FlashArt Museum in Trevi, Italy. (Note: "As Long As There Is Death, There Is Hope," FlashArt Museum, Trevi, Italy, 1999) She also co-curated, with Mary-Kay Lombino (then Assistant Curator at the UCLA-Hammer Museum), the exhibition, “Contempo-Italianate,” at Loyola Marymount University’s Laband Gallery. (Note: "Contempo-Italianate," Laband Art Gallery, Loyola Marymount University, Los Angeles, 1998)

The fascination with all that "stuff," along with its semiotic potential, eventually led Strasen to a new medium, lenticular printing, and to extensive collaboration with her husband, who provided technical support. The lenticular process is capable of merging multiple images into a single panel, allowing visuals to shift as spectators move. In 2002 she created a lenticular work that covered the ceiling of the newly designed Sylmar branch library in Los Angeles (working with the architects Hodgetts + Fung).

The largest of these lenticular pieces, a 56-panel wall installation titled Flow and Glimpse was commissioned for Los Angeles International Airport, Terminal 2 where it went on view in 2013.

As of 2022, she maintains a studio in San Pedro, California.

== Collections ==
Her work is included in many private and public collections, including the National Gallery of Art (Washington, DC); the Wellcome Trust Art Collection (London); the Colburn School of Music Art Collection (Los Angeles); the Long Beach Museum of Art; the Santa Barbara Museum of Art; the Austin Art Museum; the Frauenmuseum (Bonn, Germany); the Allen Memorial Art Museum; the Blanton Museum/University of Texas (Austin) and the collection of Herbert and Dorothy Vogel.
