= OARnet =

IT organization

The Ohio Academic Resources Network (OARnet) is a state-funded IT organization that provides member organizations with intrastate networking, virtualization and cloud computing applications, advanced videoconferencing, connections to regional and international research networks and the commodity Internet, colocation services, and emergency web-hosting.

The OARnet network (known for a time as Third Frontier Network and later, OSCnet) is a dedicated, statewide, high-speed fiber-optic network that serves Ohio K-12 schools, college and university campuses, academic medical centers, public broadcasting stations and state and local/state government.

OARnet is connected in Cleveland and Cincinnati to Internet2, the United States' most advanced nationwide research and education network. OARnet also maintains direct connections to Michigan's Merit network and OmniPoP in Chicago.

OARnet offices are located on the West Campus of Ohio State University in Columbus, Ohio, United States.

OARnet additionally serves as the delegated registrar for many third-level domains (both generic and locality-based) under .oh.us and some under .in.us and .ky.us.

== History ==
A member-organization of the Ohio Technology Consortium, the technology and information division of the Ohio Board of Regents (now the Ohio Department of Higher Education), OARnet was created by the Ohio General Assembly in 1987 to provide Ohio researchers with network connectivity to the resources of the Ohio Supercomputer Center (OSC). It was recognized at the time that the network would serve a much broader audience, so when a network name was selected in early 1988, OARnet was chosen to emphasize the many uses of the network.

The initial plan (1987) was to make use of a number of existing BITNET and CCnet (regional DECnet network) connections to get started. Three network (compatible) protocols were used, NJE, DECnet, and TCP/IP. The first OARnet-funded line was installed between Case Western Reserve University and John Carroll University in June 1987. Many subsequent lines at 9.6 kbit/s, 56 kbit/s, and T1 (1.544 Mbit/s) were installed with the aid of an Ohio Department of Administrative Services contract with Litel Corp. Internet (then NSFNET) connections were obtained in the spring of 1988. The non-TCP/IP protocols were soon phased out, and a process of upgrading connections took place regularly.

In 1991, it was decided that OARnet would accept commercial business, at appropriate rates, for Internet connection services. Thus OARnet became one of the first Internet service providers (ISPs) in Ohio. After commercial ISPs entered the business extensively, OARnet stopped seeking new commercial accounts.

A very large increase in backbone capacity occurred (planning 2000–02, installation 2003–04) when it became possible to lease optical fiber lines themselves ("dark fiber"). A new network backbone of 1,850 miles was installed at much higher capacity, and the eTech Ohio Commission and the Ohio Department of Education joined in funding and using OARnet. The fiber-optic backbone was launched in November 2004.

In 2006, OARnet provided one of the first networks for delivery of live TV via Internet Protocol, known today as IPTV. OARnet served as the backbone for Ohio News Network to transmit Miami Redhawks hockey. The team finished the 2008-2009 season at the Frozen Four with a 4-3 OT loss to Boston University in the championship. It was one of the first live sports transmission deliveries over IPTV in the US.

Another sharp jump in capacity occurred in 2012, when the State of Ohio funded an upgrade of the OARnet backbone to 100 Gigabits per second. Today, more than 1,500 miles of Ohio’s network backbone runs at an ultra-fast 100 Gbit/s, which was recognized by ComputerWorld in the Emerging Technology category of their 2013 Computerworld Honors Laureates program. In November 2012, Case Western Reserve University became the first member institution to connect at 100 Gbit/s to the OARnet backbone.

The OARnet leaders have been:

- Russell M. Pitzer, director, 1987–88
- Alison Brown, director, 1988–94
- John Ritter, acting director, 1995
- Larry Buell, acting director, 1996–97
- Douglas Gale, director, 1998–2002
- Alvin Stutz, director, 2002–05
- Pankaj Shah, executive director, 2005–15
- Paul Schopis, interim executive director, 2015–2018, executive director 2018–19
- Denis Walsh, interim executive director, 2019–20
- Pankaj Shah, executive director, 2020–
