= IAWM =

IAWM can refer to:

- International Association of Women Ministers
- International Alliance for Women in Music
- International Association of Women's Museums
- Internet Archive's Wayback Machine
- Irish Anti-War Movement
