= Ousmane William Mbaye =

Franco–Senegalese filmmaker

- Born: Ousmane William Mbaye; 1952 (age 73–74); Paris, France
- Education: University of Paris 8 Vincennes-Saint-Denis
- Occupations: Director, Executive Producer, Line Producer, Screenwriter, Foreign Producer, Director of Photography, Sound Recordist, Production Manager, Editor, Producer
- Years active: 1958–present
- Notable work: Mère-Bi
- Mother: Annette Mbaye d'Erneville

Ousmane William Mbaye (born 1952), is a Senegalese filmmaker. Mbaye is best known as the director of the critically acclaim documentary Mère-Bi and films Doomi Ngacc, Fresque and Kemtiyu, Cheikh Anta. Apart from filmmaking, he is also an executive producer, line producer, screenwriter, foreign producer, director of photography, sound recordist, production manager, editor, and producer.

== Personal life ==
He was born in 1952 in Paris, France. His mother, Annette Mbaye d'Erneville is Senegalese woman of letters.

== Career ==
Mbaye trained at the Conservatoire Libre du Cinéma Français (Free Conservatory of French Cinema). Then he studied at the University of Paris 8 Vincennes-Saint-Denis where he started filmmaking. After the graduation, he moved to Senegal then worked as an assistant director. From 1990 to 1997, he was the coordinator and founder of the Rencontres Cinématographiques of Dakar (RECIDAK).

In 1979, he produced and directed his maiden short film Doomi Ngacc. The short won the Bronze Tanit at the Carthage Film Festival. Since 2000, he started to make documentaries such as Président Dia and Kemtiyu, Cheikh Anta. In 2003, he made the documentary short Xalima la plume about Senegalese musician Seydina Insa Wade. The short later won the Documentary Prize at Milan Film Festival. In 2005, he directed the documentary Fer et verre, focused on Senegalese plastic artist Anta Germane Gaye. In 2008, he made the short Mère-Bi, which is based on his mother.

In 2016, he made the biographical documentary Kemtiyu, Cheikh Anta which deals with the life of Senegalese historian, doctor, and politician Cheikh Anta Diop. The film received positive reviews from critics and screened at several international film festivals. He was awarded the EU/ACP prize at Panafrican Film and Television Festival of Ouagadougou (FESPACO) 2017.

== Filmography ==
Year	Film	Role	Genre	Ref.
1977	Ceddo	Assistant director	Short film	
1979	Doomi Ngacc (The Child of Ngatch)	Director	Film	
1981	Duunde Yakaar	Director	Film	
1989	Dakar Clando	Director	Film	
1990	City Life	Director	Documentary film	
1992	Dial Diali	Director	Documentary short film	
1992	Fresque	Director	Film	
2002	Moi Et Mon Blanc	Assistant director	Film	
2003	Xalima la plume	Director	Short film	
2005	Fer et verre	Director	Short film	
2008	Mère-Bi	Director	Short film	
2010	L'invité	Actor	TV series	
2012	Président Dia	Director	Documentary	
2016	Kemtiyu, Cheikh Anta	Director, writer, producer	Documentary	
2019	Tabaski	Executive producer, production manager	Short film	

== See also ==
- Henriette-Bathily Women's Museum
