= Ohio Department of Higher Education =

Coordinates: 39.9615°N 83.0029°W

The Ohio Department of Higher Education is the administrative department of the Ohio state government responsible for overseeing higher education in the state. It was created as the Ohio Board of Regents in 1963 by the Ohio General Assembly. Its chancellor is a cabinet level position appointed by the governor of Ohio.

The principal roles of the department are to provide higher education policy advice to the governor and Ohio General Assembly; develop strategy involving Ohio's public and independent colleges and universities, including the University System of Ohio; advocate for and manage state funds for public colleges; and coordinate and implement state higher education policies. In 2015, the Ohio General Assembly renamed the office of the Board of Regents as the Department of Higher Education.

The board consists of nine members, in addition to two ex-officio representatives from the state legislature. The nine regents are not compensated and are appointed by the Governor to nine-year terms of service. The governor appoints the chancellor who leads a professional staff in the service of higher education. The department and its oversight is separate from the Ohio Department of Education.

The Ohio Technology Consortium (OH-TECH), created in 2011 as the technology and information division of the Ohio Department of Higher Education, comprises the Ohio Supercomputer Center (OSC), the Ohio Academic Resources Network (OARnet), and the Ohio Library Information Network (OhioLINK).
