= Raymond Sheline =

American chemist (1922 – 2016)

Raymond K. Sheline (March 31, 1922 – February 10, 2016) was a member of the Manhattan Project and spent much of his career as a professor in chemistry and physics at Florida State University. Sheline's research focused on spectroscopic studies of atomic nuclei and molecular structures.

== Education and career ==
Sheline was born in Port Clinton, Ohio and a graduate of Woodward High School. He studied at Bethany College in West Virginia, where he graduated in 1943. From 1943 till 1945, he worked on the Manhattan Project as a chemist at Columbia University. Sheline went to graduate school at University of California, Berkeley after World War II and obtained his PhD in chemistry there in 1949 under the supervision of Kenneth Pitzer. His PhD thesis dealt with vibrational spectroscopy of polyatomic molecules.

Sheline taught at the University of Chicago for two years after his PhD. From 1951 to 1999, Sheline was a professor in chemistry and physics at Florida State University. Between 1966 and 1967, he was named Robert O. Lawton Distinguished Professor.

Sheline was a three-time Guggenheim fellow and a Fulbright scholar.

== Personal life ==
Sheline married Yvonne Sheline in 1951, they have seven children.
