= Women's Museum Merano =

Coordinates: 46.6715°N 11.1636°E

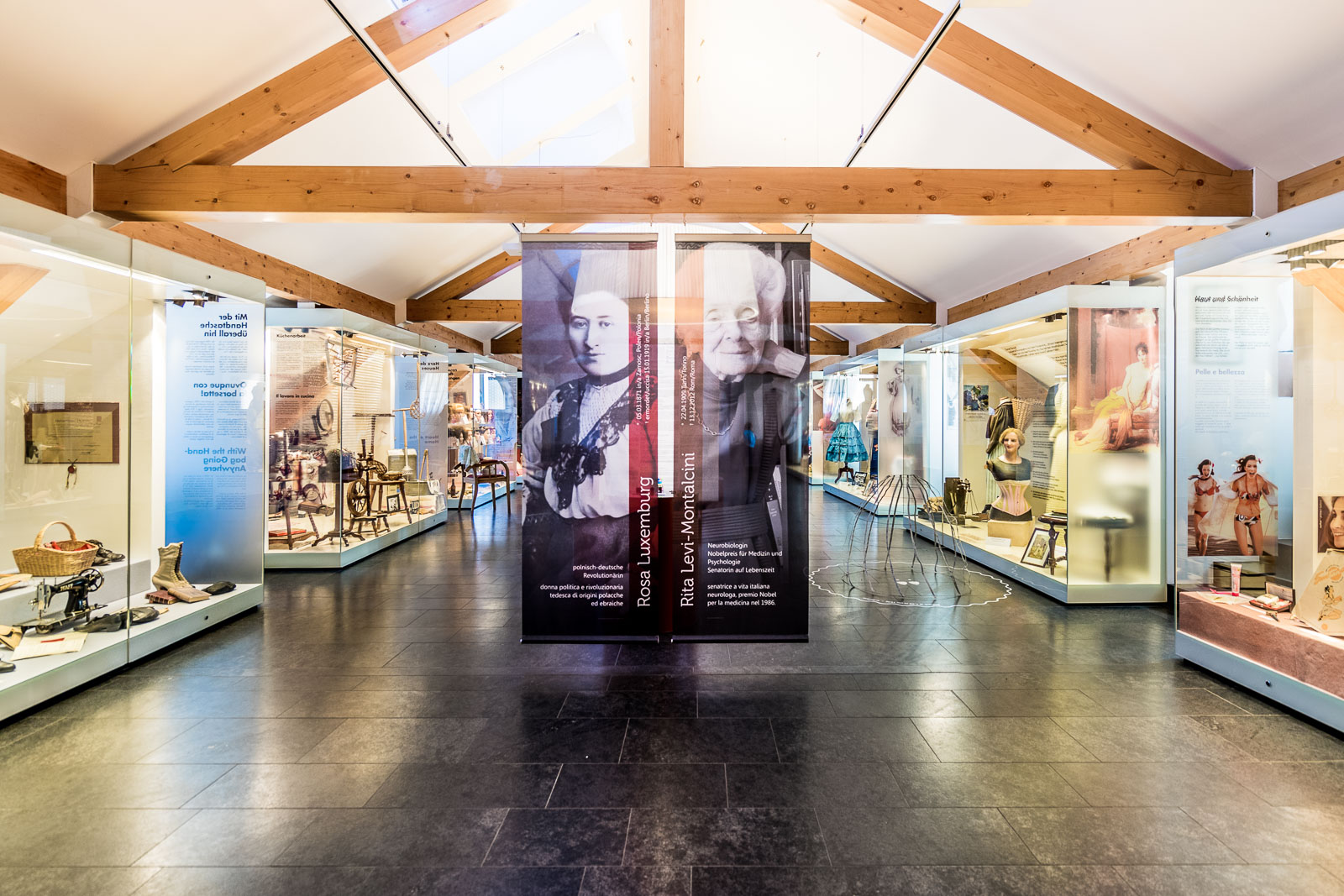
Permanent exhibition of the Women's Museum Merano

The Women's Museum Merano is located in a former convent of the Poor Clares in the centre of Meran (Italy). It is administrated by an association and is also the registration office of the International Association of Women's Museums (IAWM).

== Exhibition ==
In its permanent exhibition the museum shows cultural and everyday history from a female point of view. The exhibits from the museum's collection include fashion, accessories, every day objects, books and documents. The museum represents female ideals, role models and images in 19th and 20th century, and thereby investigates the present situation of women in society.

In special exhibitions and various events there is an enlargement of the repertoire of female-specific and gender sensitive topics.

== History ==
The museum was founded by Evelyn Ortner in 1988 and is administrated by an association since 1993. In 2011 the museum was transferred to the former convent of the Poor Clares.

== International networking ==
In 2008 the first international congress of women's museums took place in Merano. Since then the Women's Museum Merano is coordination site of the International Association of Women's Museums (IAWM) and is connecting over 30 women's museums and initiatives worldwide.

== Bibliography ==
- Elke Krasny, Women's Museum Merano (ed.): Women's:Museum. Frauen:Museum. Curatorial Politics in Feminism, Education, History and Art. Löckerverlag, 2013.
