= Victoria Albis =

Victoria Albis (d. after 1777), was a Senegalese signara. She belonged to the most well known representatives of the famous signaras on the island of Gorée in French Senegal which at the time was considered to be part of Guinea (region). She was an influential figure in business in contemporary Senegal.

Victoria Albis was a Luso-African. She belonged to the pioneer settlers of the Luso-Africans who settled on Gorée when after the final French control of Senegal, and who formed a community of Luso-African and French-Senegalese signaras in the period of 1701–1725.

The present Henriette-Bathily Women's Museum was built by her.

== Sources ==
- Gorée: the island and the Historical Museum. Abdoulaye Camara, Institut fondamental d'Afrique noire Cheikh Anta Diop, Joseph-Roger de Benoist, Musée historique du Sénégal.IFAN-Cheikh Anta Diop, 1993
- Globalizing the Postcolony: Contesting Discourses of Gender and Development. Claire H. Griffiths. 2010
