= Mère-Bi =

- Directed by: Ousmane William Mbaye
- Screenplay by: Ousmane William Mbaye
- Produced by: Les films Mama Yandé, Autoproduction
- Cinematography: Ousmane William Mbaye
- Edited by: Laurence Attali
- Music by: Doudou Doukouré
- Release date: 2008
- Running time: 55 minutes
- Country: Senegal

Mère-Bi is a 2008 Senegalese documentary film about Annette Mbaye d'Erneville by her son, director Ousmane William Mbaye. As the first female journalist of her country, Annette was deeply involved in the development of her country. Both an activist and a non-conformist, she fought for the emancipation of women from the beginning. She divided her life between France, where she studied, and Senegal, where she returned in 1957, sensing that independence was on its way.
