= Tales of Amadou Koumba =

1947 story collection by Birago Diop

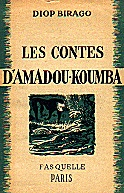
- First edition
- Author: Birago Diop
- Original title: Les Contes d'Amadou Koumba
- Genre: Literary fiction
- Publisher: Fasquelle
- Publication place: France
- Media type: Print (hardcover)

Tales of Amadou Koumba or Les Contes d'Amadou Koumba is a collection of tales from Senegal, presented as being transcribed by Birago Diop from the accounts of his family's griot, Amadou Koumba. Diop later acknowledged, however, that the tales were drawn from a number of storytellers he had met, not only Amadou Koumba. The book was first published in 1947.

This is one of the first significant attempts to put African oral literature into written form. According to Roland Colin, these tales reveal the finest art of the Wolof griots and Birago Diop makes these tales audible to the European reader and the least informed of the "Black African spirit".

Most of the tales from this volume, as well as five from its follow-up Les Nouveaux Contes d'Amadou Koumba, were translated into English by Dorothy S. Blair in the compilation Tales of Amadou Koumba (Oxford University Press, 1966).

== Tales ==
- "Fari l'ânesse" (Fari the She-Ass)
- "Un jugement" (A Judgement)
- "Les mamelles" (The Humps)
- "N'Gor Niébé"
- "Maman-Caïman" (Mother Crocodile)
- "Les mauvaises compagnies [I–IV]" (Bad Company)
- "La lance de l'hyène" (The Hyena's Spear)
- "Une commission" (An Errand)
- "Le salaire" (The Reward)
- "Tours de lièvre" (The Tricks of Leuk-the-Hare)
- "Petit-mari" (Little-Husband)
- "Vérité et mensonge" (Truth and Falsehood)
- "La biche et les deux chasseurs" (The Deer and the Two Huntsmen)
- "Les calebasses de Kouss" (The Calabashes of Kouss)
- "L'héritage" (The Inheritance)
- "Sarzan"

Blair's compilation, Tales of Amadou Koumba, also includes these five tales from Les Nouveaux Contes: "Le Prétexte" (The Excuse), "La Roussette" (The Flying Fox), "Le Boli" (The Boli), "Dolf-Diop" (Dof-Diop), and "L'Os" (The Bone).

== Editions ==
- Paris, Fasquelle, coll. « Écrivains d'Outre-Mer », 1947
- Rééd. Paris/Dakar, Présence Africaine, 1961
- Rééd. Paris/Dakar, Présence Africaine, 1969
