= Hittisau Women's Museum =

Museum in Austria

Coordinates: 47°27′23″N 9°57′41″E

- Frauenmuseum Hittisau
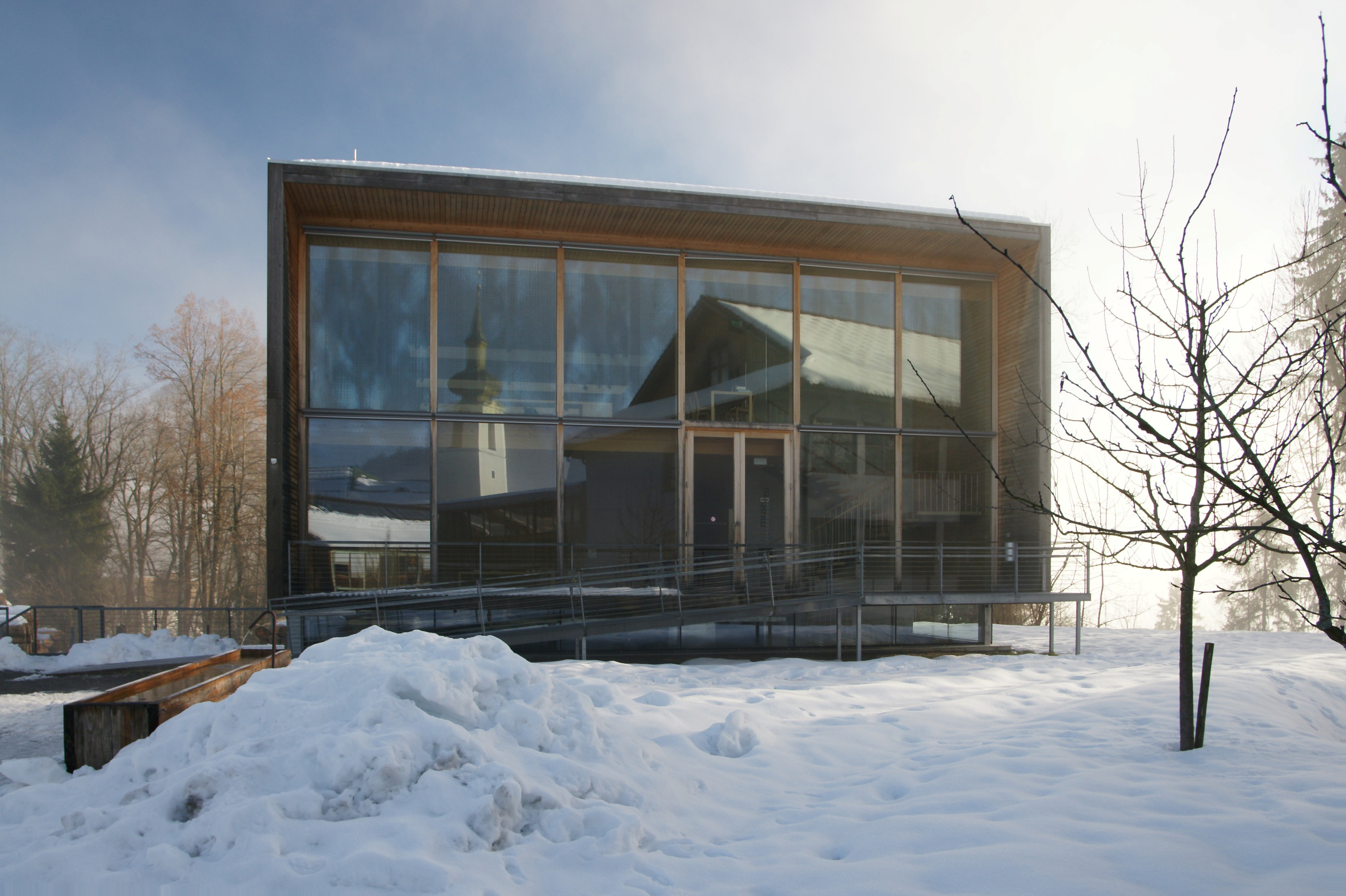
- Established: 2000
- Location: Hittisau, Vorarlberg, Austria
- Director: Stefania Pitscheider Soraperra
- Website: https://www.frauenmuseum.at/index.php?cat=1

Hittisau Women's Museum (German: Frauenmuseum Hittisau) is a museum in Hittisau, Austria, devoted to women. It was founded in 2000 and is the only museum of its kind in the country.

The museum displays the cultural achievements of women – particularly from the local Bregenzerwald region – through exhibitions, cultural events, teaching activities for children, presentations and workshops.

It is part of the International Association of Women's Museums (IAWM).

The museum won the 2017 Austrian Museum Award.

== Architecture ==
The museum occupies the upper floor of the Feuerwehrhaus und Kulturhaus ("Fire Brigade House and Culture House"), which was built from 1998 to 2000 by the local authorities. The local fire brigade occupies the large basement, there is a seminar room on the ground floor, and a local brass band is also based here. The upper section is made of wood (local silver fir), and the building has a large glass frontage.

The building received several architectural prizes, including the national architecture award "Österreichischer Bauherrenpreis" (2000), the "Vorarlberger Hypo-Bauherrenpreis" (2001) in the category Municipal buildings, the "Vorarlberger Holzbaupreis" (2001) as well as the first prize in the category Public cultural and recreational facilities in the national competition "Human-friendly constructing" (2002).

Hittisau Women's Museum – architecture

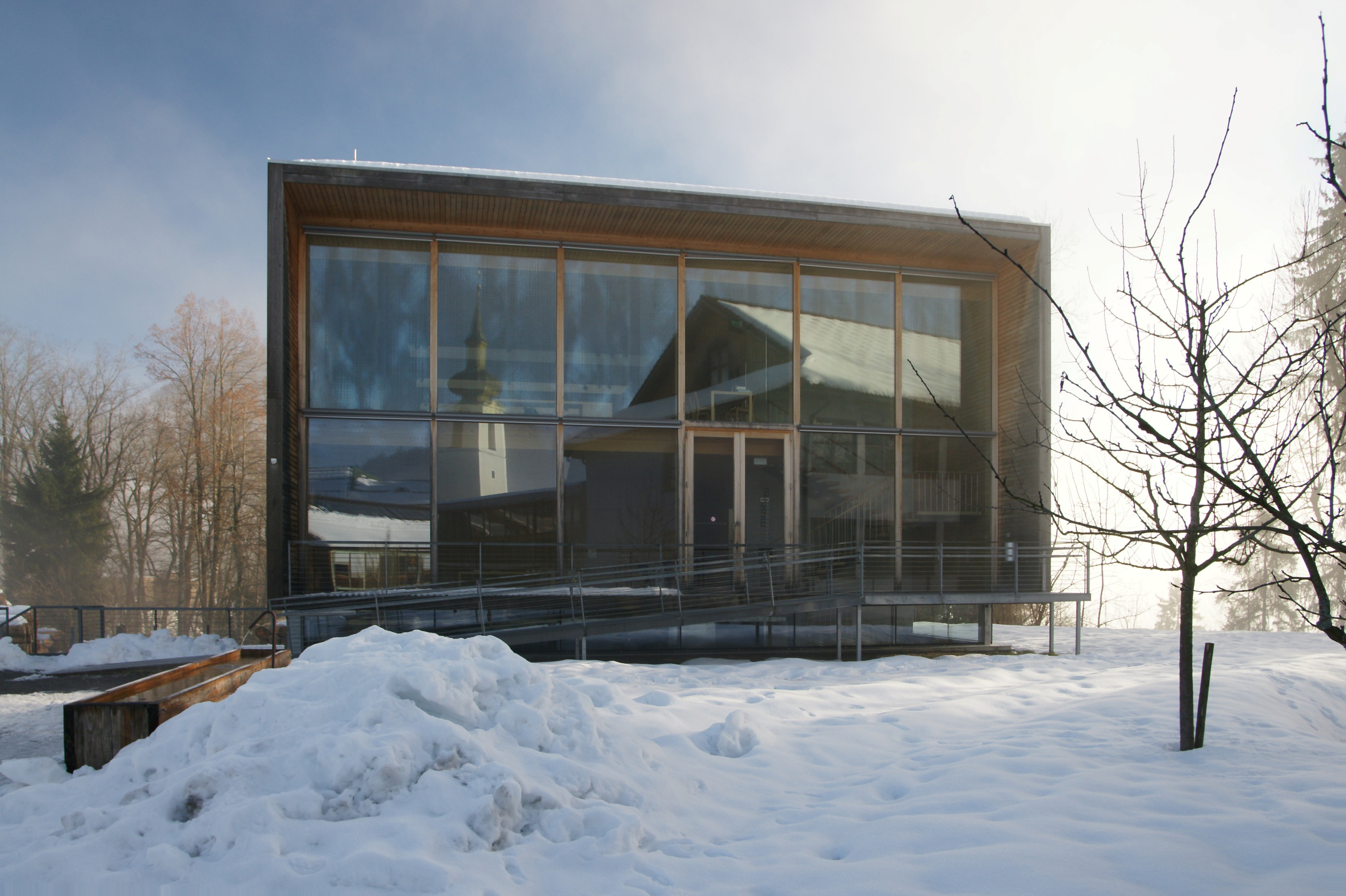
Glass front of the building

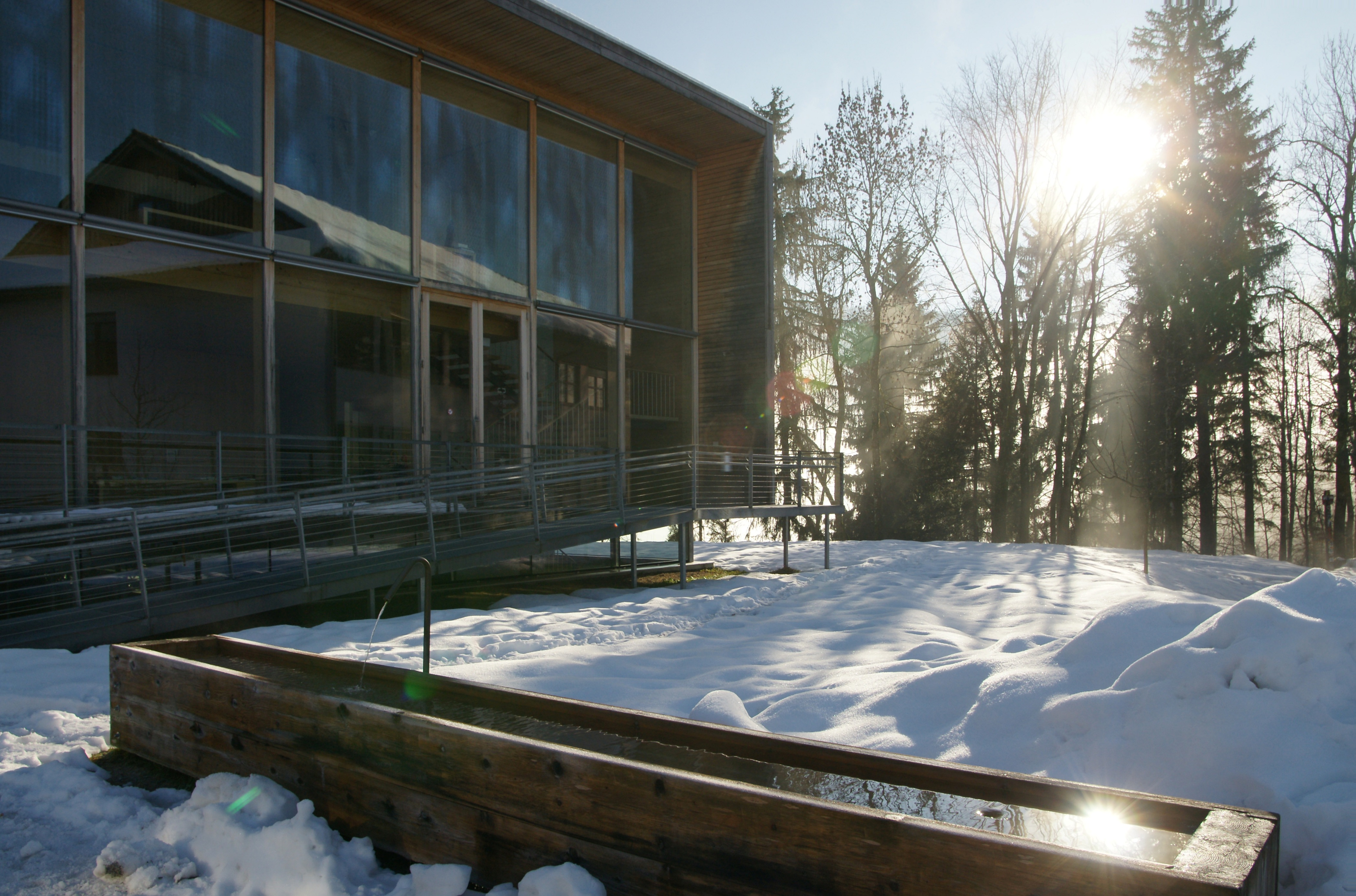

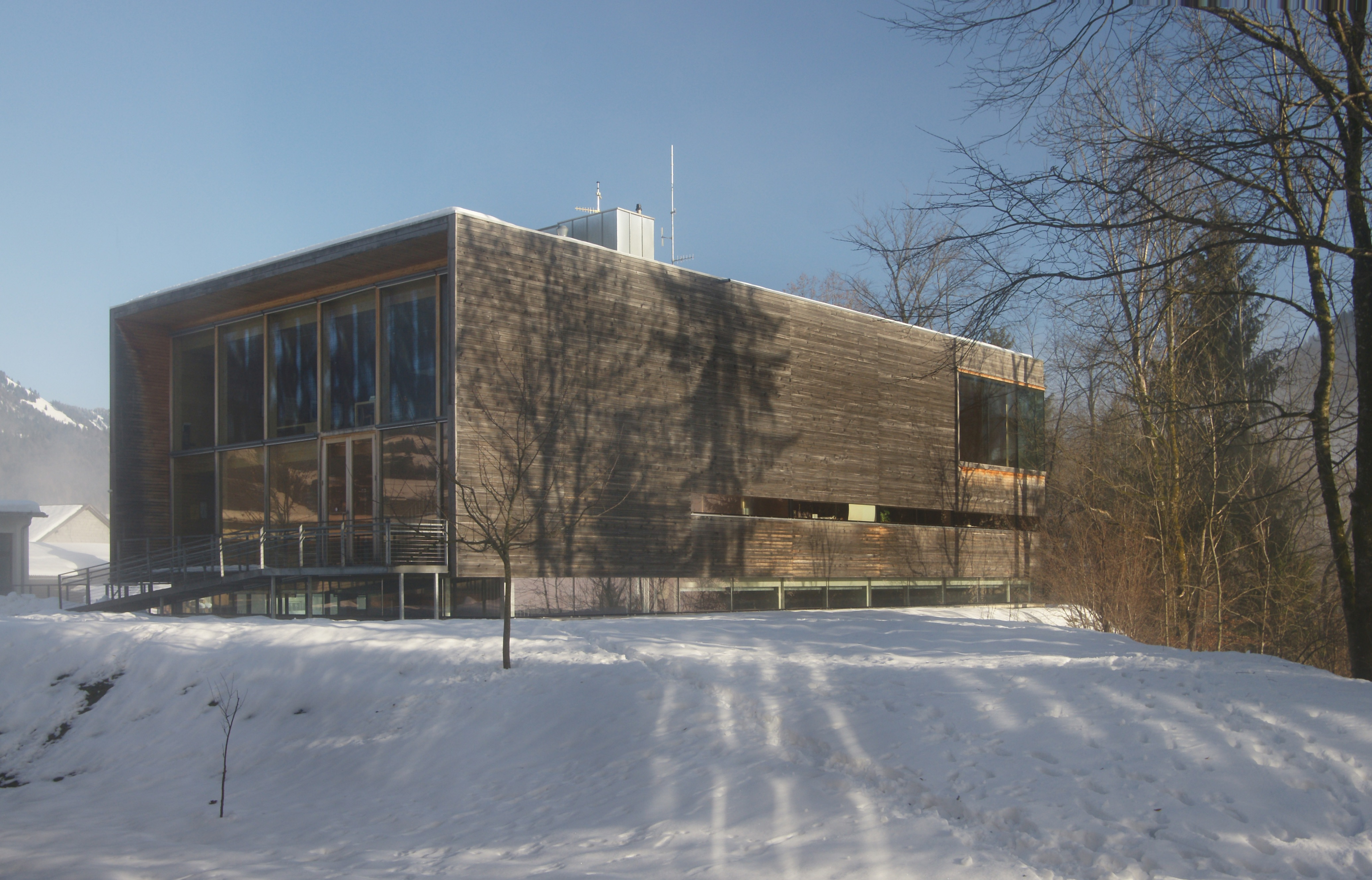

== See also ==
- Bonn Women's Museum
