= Awa (magazine) =

Senegalese women's magazine

Awa : la revue de la femme noire
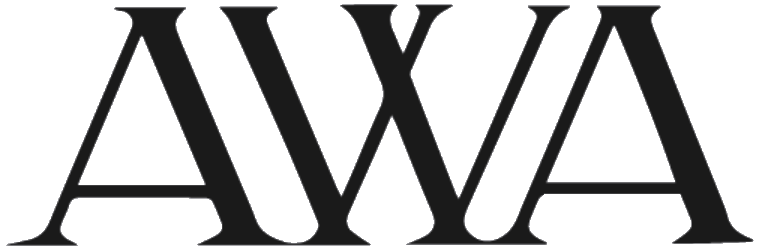

- January 1964 issue of Awa
- Editor: Annette Mbaye d'Erneville
- Categories: African women
- Founded: 1964
- Final issue: 1973
- Country: Senegal
- Based in: Dakar
- Language: French
- Website: awamagazine.org
- OCLC: 473965151

AWA, la revue de la femme noire (French pronunciation: [ɑwɑ: la ʁəvy də la fam nwaʁ], English: AWA, Journal of the Black woman) was a Senegalese women's magazine published monthly from 1964 to 1973.

== Production ==
Awa was founded in Dakar by Annette M'baye d'Erneville and a network of African women. The magazine was originally conceived in 1957 as Femmes de Soleil (Sun women) but was renamed and the first issue was published in 1964. The name Awa refers to Eve, the first woman according to the Bible, Hawwâ' in Arabic. Awa aimed to establish community and identity The journal is considered to be a pioneering women's magazine for offering a space for dialogue and representation to African women.

It was produced on a voluntary basis at Abdoulaye Diop's printshop, the first private printing press in Senegal, remaining independent from state or religious influence. The magazine was funded by subscriptions, as well as approximately 10% from advertising, and a small amount from occasional small donations from Léopold Sédar Senghor, the president of Senegal at the time.

The production of Awa was paused in 1966 due to financial difficulties and resumed six years later. In 1972, Michel de Breteuil offered to buy the magazine, but the team refused, preferring to maintain independence and distance from French influence. Breteuil went on to found Amina, another magazine targeted towards Black women in the same year. Due to a persisting lack of resources, production could not be sustained and the final issue of Awa was released in May 1973.

== Editorial team ==
The founder and Editor-in-chief was Annette Mbaye d'Erneville, a radio journalist, writer and Director of Programming of Radio Senegal. The editorial team was composed primarily of women, many of whom were renowned intellectuals, including Oulimata Bâ; psychoanalyst Solange Faladé; poet Virginie Camara, and Henriette Bathily, Director of the cultural department of the French Cultural Centre. Anta Diop, the wife of Abdoulaye Diop was also part of the editorial board and performed various duties including accounting, publicity and proofreading.

== Format and distribution ==
Each issue of Awa consisted of 36 pages in black and white with a cover page in color. Awa was published monthly, with 5000 copies of each issue released from January 1964 to December 1964, then at a more irregular pace until 1966. A second serious of four issues was released from October 1972 to May 1973.

Awa took inspiration from other African publications as well as French women's magazines, especially glossy magazines. It features articles on various aspects of African womanhood as well as contributions from readers around the world, both men and women.

== Legacy ==
Awa has been recognised as an important early example of African women's writing and engagement before the appearance of the first novels written by Senegalese women in the 1970s. It has been studied as an example of African women's reading and writing cultures in the period following the independence of many African nations in the 1960s.

In 2017, all nineteen issues of the magazine were digitized by the Institut Fondamental d'Afrique Noire-Cheikh Anta Diop (IFAN) and made available online as part of the Global Challenges research project run by the University of Bristol and the Paul Valéry University Montpellier 3 in partnership with the National Archives of Senegal in Dakar. An exhibition was organised from November 2017 to January 2018 at the Henriette-Bathily Women's Museum in Dakar and subsequently in Montpellier and Bordeaux.
