= Ohio Supercomputer Center =

Supercomputer facility at Ohio State University

Coordinates: 40°00′00″N 83°02′24″W

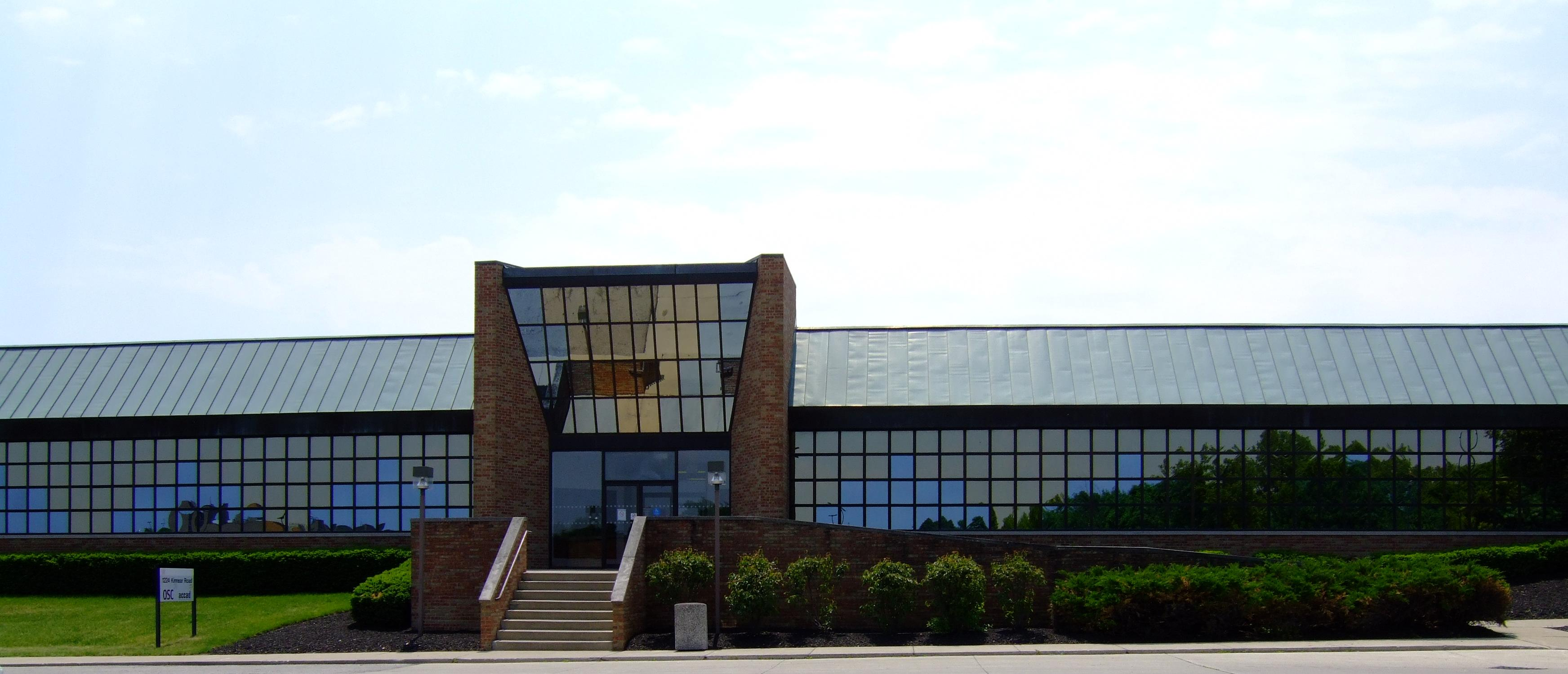
OSC offices on Kinnear Road in Columbus.

The Ohio Supercomputer Center (OSC) is a supercomputer facility located on the western end of the Ohio State University campus, just north of Columbus. Established in 1987, the OSC partners with Ohio universities, labs and industries, providing students and researchers with high performance computing, advanced cyberinfrastructure, research and computational science education services.

OSC is member-organization of the Ohio Technology Consortium, the technology and information division of the Ohio Department of Higher Education. OSC works with an array of statewide/regional/national communities, including education, academic research, industry, and state government. The Center's research programs are primarily aligned with three of several key areas of research identified by the state to be well positioned for growth and success, such as the biosciences, advanced materials and energy/environment.

OSC is funded through the Ohio Department of Higher Education by the state operating and capital budgets of the Ohio General Assembly.

== History ==
OSC was established by the Ohio Board of Regents (now the Ohio Department of Higher Education) in 1987 as a statewide resource designated to place Ohio's research universities and private industry in the forefront of computational research. Also in 1987, the OSC networking initiative — known today as OARnet — provided the first network access to the Center’s first Cray supercomputer.

In 1988, OSC launched the Center’s Industrial Interface Program to serve businesses interested in accessing the supercomputer. Battelle Memorial Institute, located just south of Ohio State, became OSC’s first industrial user. Today, the Center continues to offer HPC services to researcher in industry, primarily through its AweSim industrial engagement program.

In the summer of 1989, 20 talented high school students attended the first Governor’s Summer Institute. Today, OSC offers summer STEM education programs through Summer Institute and Young Women's summer Institute, which began in 2000.

Later in the fall of 1989, OSC engineers installed a $22 million Cray Y-MP8/864 system, which was deemed the largest and fastest supercomputer in the world for a short time. The seven-ton system was able to calculate 200 times faster than many mainframes at that time.

Directors of the Center:

- William McCurdy, Ph.D., OSC Acting Director, 1986–87
- Charles Bender, Ph.D., OSC Executive Director, 1987-2002
- Al Stutz, OSC Acting Director, 2001
- Russell Pitzer, Ph.D., OSC Interim Director, 2001-2003
- Stanley Ahalt, Ph.D., OSC Executive Director, 2003-2009
- Ashok Krishnamurthy, Ph.D., OSC Interim Co-executive Director, 2009-2012
- Steven Gordon, Ph.D., OSC Interim Co-executive Director, 2009-2012
- Pankaj Shah, OSC Executive Director, 2012-2015
- David Hudak, Ph.D., OSC Interim Executive Director, 2015-2018, Executive Director 2018-

== Systems ==
Production systems (Mar. 2022) include:

- Pitzer Cluster (installed 2019): A 10,240-core Dell Intel Gold 6148 machine + 19,104-core Dual Intel Xeon 8268 machine

- 224 nodes have 40 cores per node and 192 GB of memory per node
- 340 nodes have 48 cores per node and 192 GB of memory per node
- 32 nodes have 40 cores, 384 GB of memory, and 2 NVIDIA Volta V100 GPUs
- 42 nodes have 48 cores, 384 GB of memory, and 2 NVIDIA Volta V100 GPUs
- 4 nodes have 48 cores, 768 GB of memory, and 4 NVIDIA Volta V100s w/32GB GPU memory and NVLink
- 4 nodes have 80 cores and 3.0 TB of memory for large Symmetric Multiprocessing (SMP) style jobs
- Theoretical system peak performance of 3940 teraflops (CPU only)

- Owens Cluster (installed 2016): A 23,392-core Dell Intel Xeon E5-2680 v4 machine

- 648 nodes have 28 cores per node and 128 GB of memory per node
- 16 nodes have 48 cores and 1.5 TB of memory for large Symmetric Multiprocessing (SMP) style jobs
- 160 nodes have 28 cores, 128 GB of memory, and 1 NVIDIA Tesla P100 GPU
- Theoretical system peak performance 750 teraflops (CPU only)

- Storage Systems

- 5.3 Petabytes of storage
- 5.5 Petabytes of tape backup
