= OmniPop =

OmniPop is a program used to class populations by autosomal DNA results. It is a Microsoft Excel file and requires Excel to run. The program is recognized and used by NIST for the purpose of clustering autosomal markers and is also suggested by commercial genealogical genetics companies to their customers for use in understanding their results.
