= Catherine Shan =

Senegalese novel and film script writer

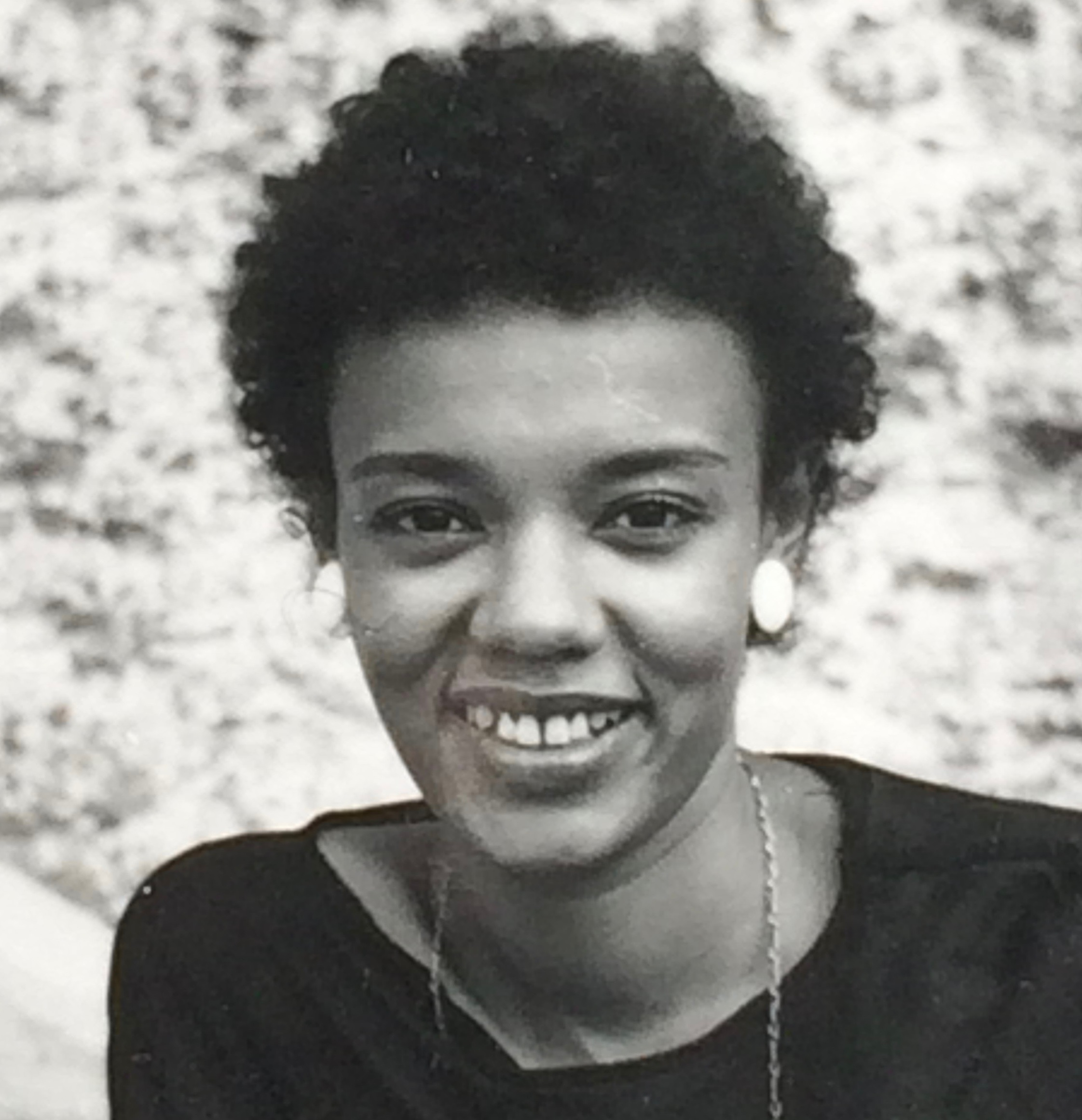
- Catherine Shan, 1983
- Born: 23 September 1952
- Died: 11 September 2018 (aged 65)
- Other names: Catherine N' Diaye
- Citizenship: Senegal, France
- Occupations: Philosophy professor, journalist, writer
- Known for: Worked in the office of the director general of UNESCO
- Notable work: Worked as a journalist with Jeune Afrique

Catherine Shan (23 September 1952 in Baccarat, Meurthe-et-Moselle – 11 September 2018) was a writer from France.

== Biography ==
The daughter of a French mother and a Senegalese father, she was born Catherine N'Diaye in Baccarat, Meurthe-et-Moselle and grew up in Africa. From 1975 to 1981, she was a philosophy professor in France. From 1982 to 1983, she worked in the office of the director general of UNESCO. Shan then was employed as a journalist, working with the group "Jeune Afrique", for the magazine Géo, for Radio Nederlands and as a freelancer. She also wrote or directed a number of films.

== Selected publications ==
- Gens de sable, autobiographical novel (1984)
- La coquetterie ou la passion du détail, essay (1987)
- La vie à deux, novel (1998)
- Sa vie africaine, novel (2007)

== Selected films ==
- Un dimanche à Paris (1994), wrote script
- Emmanuel Bove (1996), co-wrote script
- Le cycle des saisons (1998), director
- L'atelier de Susan, documentary (2005), director
- L'œil de la forêt (2005), director
