= William Bruce Pitzer =

American Navy officer (1917–1966)

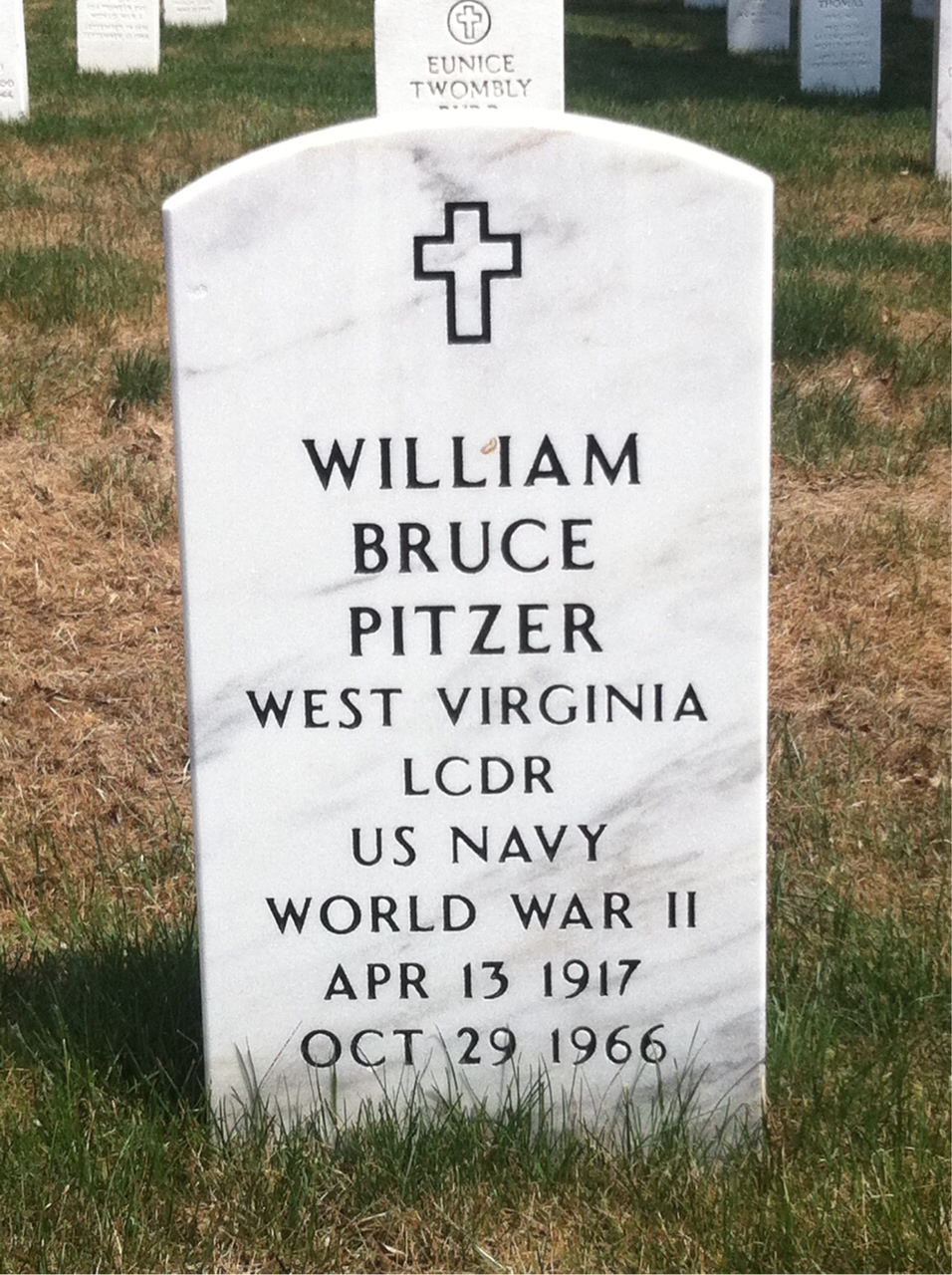
Grave at Arlington National Cemetery

William Bruce Pitzer (April 13, 1917 – October 29, 1966) was an officer of the United States Navy whose death is speculated to have had some connection with the assassination of John F. Kennedy.

== Life and career ==
Pitzer joined the Navy reserve in 1934 at the age of seventeen and trained as a Radiologic technologist. After discharge in 1939, he worked for three years as chief technologist at the Episcopal Ear, Eye and Nose Hospital. He re-enlisted in 1942 after the United States entered World War II. His obituaries listed him as "a consultant to the visual arts department of Montgomery Junior College".

== Death ==
At the time of the Kennedy assassination, Pitzer worked at the National Naval Medical Center (NNMC) where Kennedy's autopsy took place. Pitzer's alleged possession of autopsy-related film and photographs is briefly discussed in the television documentary The Men Who Killed Kennedy. A fellow naval officer of Pitzer's named Dennis David says that he viewed such materials in Pitzer's office at the NNMC, and that they appeared to contradict the official findings of the autopsy. At the time of his death, Pitzer held the rank of Lieutenant Commander. He was found in the NNMC television studio next to his office with a single gunshot wound to the head. Pitzer's death occurred the same day that the Kennedy family agreed, through their attorney, to release to the National Archives several items related to the autopsy of the fallen president, including photographs and x-rays. The Naval investigation into Pitzer's death reported no evidence of foul play. He is buried at Arlington National Cemetery.

== Allegations surrounding death ==
Dennis David's recollections of the autopsy and of Pitzer's materials were first made public in an anonymous 1975 interview with the Waukegan, Illinois News Sun. Since that time, Pitzer's name (often accompanied by misreported circumstances of his death) has appeared in many printed or televised lists of "suspicious deaths" having an alleged connection to the Kennedy assassination. Lt. Col. Dan Marvin (US Army, retired) claimed that when he saw such a list in 1993, it brought back to his memory an incident in the summer of 1965 in which he was asked by the Central Intelligence Agency to kill Pitzer. The author who Marvin engaged to co-write a book on the subject came to have serious doubts about Marvin's story. Dennis David alleged that Pitzer was left-handed but the bullet entry wound was on the right side of his head, from which David inferred that Pitzer may have been murdered. Family members have stated that Pitzer was in fact right-handed. Pitzer is also sometimes said to have been present at the Kennedy autopsy at the NNMC, though he was not among those noted in official records.
