= Henriette-Bathily Women's Museum =

Museum in Dakar, Senegal

Coordinates: 14°40′03″N 17°23′51″W

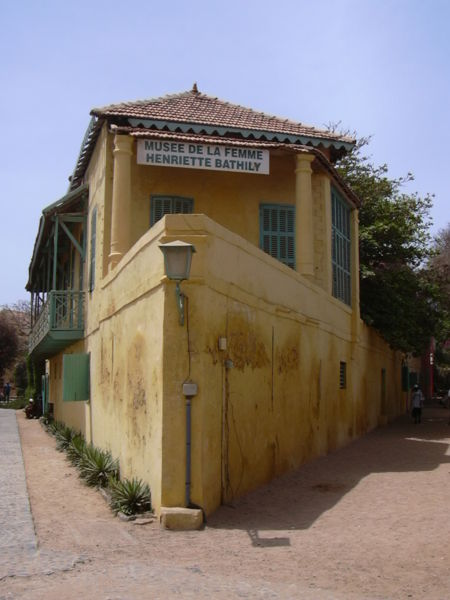
The former home of Victoria Albis

The Henriette-Bathily Women's Museum (in French: Musée de la Femme Henriette-Bathily) is a museum which was located on Gorée, an island on the coast of Senegal, across from the House of Slaves museum. In May 2015, it moved to Dakar, at the Place du Souvenir Africain et de la Diaspora (Corniche Ouest). A project conceived in 1987 by the filmmaker Ousmane William Mbaye, it was opened in 1994 under the direction of Annette Mbaye d'Erneville.

== Henriette Bathily ==
The museum is named after Henriette Bathily, who was trained as a nursery nurse in France from 1947–1951, was director of Les Ballets Africains founded by Fodéba Keïta, became a director of news reports in Radio Mali and Radio Sénégal, and was the director of the cultural department of the Senegalese Centre culturel français from 1963 to her death on 4 April 1984. In 1975, Bathily helped to organise an international travelling exhibition, "The place and role of Senegalese women in rituals". Bathily supported the careers of several African artists, choreographs and actors and discreetly supported women's movements.

== Collections ==
There were two levels within this colonial residence, built in 1777 during the French colonial period, having belonged to a wealthy signare, Victoria Albis. Until 1962, it was the property of the Angrand family, notably Armand-Pierre Angrand, a descendant of the signare, writer, a mayor of Gorée and the first mayor of colour of Dakar in 1936.

Museum exhibits include common objects from the colonial period, farming tools, musical instruments, pottery, basketry, as well as photographs allowing a better understanding of the daily life of women in the country. The prominent figures of Senegalese women's emancipation are celebrated, for example the novelist Aminata Sow Fall. The building was also previously a courthouse, then the Museum of the Institut fondamental d'Afrique noire which was succeeded in 1966 by Institut Français d'Afrique Noire.

== Activities ==
Workshops were organized there and women of the island gather there to work together, to follow literacy courses, or to receive artisanal training (cloth dyeing, batik, weaving, glass painting, or traditional embroidery).

Specific projects are aimed at disabled women.

== Other facilities ==
The museum has a number of facilities in addition to the artifact displays. It includes an audiovisual room; a boutique; a garden cafe, and an "Espace Culturel et Artisanat" (cultural and artisan space) enabling groups of women from all regions and ethnic backgrounds of Senegal to work at the museum and demonstrate their wide knowledge to visitors. It also provides women with education and training in literacy, civil education, environmental conservation and health education provides training in handicraft techniques. There is a documentation and specialized library service to provide a public databank and research centre.

== See also ==
- House of Slaves (Gorée)

== Bibliography ==
- Annette Mbaye d'Erneville, Le musée de la Femme Henriette-Bathily à Gorée : premier musée privé au Sénégal, p. 1; The Henriette Bathily Museum of Women's History, Gorée: the first private museum in Senegal, p. 5, Bulletin du WAMP (West African Museums Programme), n° 7, 1997.
- Jean Luc Angrand, Céleste ou le temps des Signares (Editions Anne Pépin, 2006). (in French)
