= Abibatou Traoré =

Senegalese writer

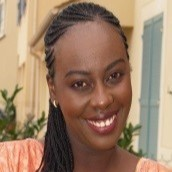
- Born: 25 April 1973 (age 52); Dakar
- Occupations: Writer; Association football player

Abibatou Traoré (born 25 April 1973) is a Senegalese writer and a member of the "Eminent Minds" panel created by Secretary General Kofi Annan. This panel was created to make suggestions for the fundamental reformation of the United Nations as an institution.

== Works ==
- Sidagamie Présence Africaine Éditions, 1998. ISBN 2-7087-0673-X
- Samba le fou L'Harmattan, 2006. ISBN 2-296-01961-7
- L'homme de la maison, Présence africaine, 2022. ISBN 978-2-7087-0995-9
