= Léopold Angrand =

Senegalese politician (1859–1906)

Léopold Angrand (October 16, 1859 – October 7, 1906) was a Senegalese politician and a noble descendant of Métis signare Goree. He was the son of Pierre Angrand (1820–?) and the rich signare Helena St. John (1826–1859, died in childbirth), herself a granddaughter of Governor Estoupan Blaise Saint-Jean and signare Marie Therese Rossignol. His son was Armand-Pierre Angrand.
