= Amina Sow Mbaye =

Senegalese writer and educator (born 1937)

Amina Sow Mbaye (born 25 September 1937) is a Senegalese writer and educator.

She was born in Saint-Louis. Because her father was in the military, she attended primary schools in various cities and then secondary school in Saint-Louis. She obtained her Brevet d'éducation du premier cycle, trained for three additional months and then taught school in Dagana and then Saint-Louis. After she completed her Brevet Supérieur de Capacité, she became headmistress of the Écoles normales régionales in Saint-Louis.

Mbaye has served as president of the Senegalese Federation of Women's Associations and of the Ordre national du Lion du Sénégal. She was also the first qualified female basketball umpire in Senegal.

== Selected works ==
- Mademoiselle, novel (1984)
- Pour le sang du mortier, novel (2001)
- Petit essai sur la vieillesse (essay) and Les Bulles (poetry) (2007)
