= Annette Mbaye d'Erneville =

Senegalese writer (born 1926)

Annette Mbaye d’Erneville
- Born: 23 June 1926 (age 100)
- Citizenship: Senegalese
- Occupations: Writer, journalist and radio director
- Known for: Children's literature, poetry, women's issues
- Notable work: Poèmes africains, Kaddu, Chansons pour Laïty
- Awards: prix Jeune Afrique (1961)

Annette Mbaye d’Erneville (born 23 June 1926) is a Senegalese writer. She is the mother of filmmaker Ousmane William Mbaye, and was the subject of his 2008 documentary film, Mère-Bi.

== Career ==
Born on 23 June 1926 in Sokone, Senegal, and educated locally, she began her working life as a teacher. In 1947 she went to France to study journalism, and since 1963 was active in Radio Senegal, rising to become Director of Programmes. She has also been a journalist specializing in women's issues and in 1963 launched Awa magazine, the first francophone publication for African women. She specialises in writing children's literature and poetry and is associated with the Musée de la Femme Henriette-Bathily in Gorée.

== Works ==
- 1965: Poèmes africains
- 1966: Kaddu (réédition des poèmes)
- 1976: Chansons pour Laïty
- 1983: Le Noël du vieux chasseur
- 1983: La Bague de cuivre et d'argent (prix Jeune Afrique in 1961)
- 2003: Motte de terre et motte de beurre
- 2003: Picc l'Oiseau et Lëpp-Lëpp le papillon

=== Bibliography ===
- Aliane, "Mme Mbaye d'Erneville, directrice des programmes à l'Office de radiodiffusion du Sénégal", Amina, n° 32, July 1975, pp. 21–23.
- Pierrette Herzberger-Fofana, "Annette Mbaye d'Erneville (Sénégal)", in Littérature féminine francophone d'Afrique noire, Paris, L'Harmattan, 2000, pp. 374–81.
- Annette Mbaye d'Erneville (Sénégal), Audrey, future princesse d'Erneville.
