= Kenneth Pitzer =

American academic administrator (1914–1997)

Kenneth S. Pitzer
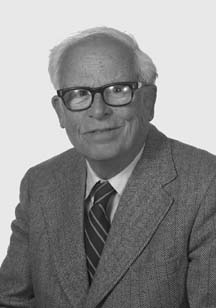
- Kenneth Sanborn Pitzer

6th President of Stanford University
- In office December 1, 1968 – June 25, 1970
- Preceded by: Wallace Sterling; Robert Glaser (acting)
- Succeeded by: Richard Wall Lyman

3rd President of Rice University
- In office 1961–1968
- Preceded by: William Vermillion Houston
- Succeeded by: Norman Hackerman

Personal details
- Born: January 6, 1914 Pomona, California, U.S.
- Died: December 26, 1997 (aged 83) Berkeley, California, U.S.
- Children: Russell M. Pitzer
- Parent: Russell K. Pitzer (father)
- Education: California Institute of Technology (BS); University of California, Berkeley (PhD)
- Awards: ACS Award in Pure Chemistry (1943); Priestley Medal (1969); National Medal of Science (1975); American Institute of Chemists Gold Medal (1976); Welch Award in Chemistry (1984)
- Scientific career
- Fields: Chemistry
- Workplaces: University of California, Berkeley; Rice University; Stanford University
- Thesis: Theoretical calculations and experimental determinations of entropies and related thermodynamic quantities (1937)
- Doctoral advisor: Wendell Latimer
- Doctoral students: George C. Pimentel; Oktay Sinanoğlu; Robert Curl; Raymond Sheline

Kenneth Sanborn Pitzer (January 6, 1914 – December 26, 1997) was an American physical and theoretical chemist who served as the third president of Rice University from 1961 to 1968 and as the sixth president of Stanford University from 1968 to 1970. He was described as "one of the most influential physical chemists of his era" whose work "spanned almost all of the important fields of physical chemistry: thermodynamics, statistical mechanics, molecular structure, quantum mechanics, spectroscopy, chemical bonding, relativistic chemical effects, properties of concentrated aqueous salt solutions, kinetics, and conformational analysis."

== Biography ==
Pitzer received his B.S. in 1935 from the California Institute of Technology and his Ph.D. from the University of California, Berkeley in 1937. Upon graduation, he was appointed to the faculty of UC Berkeley's chemistry department and was eventually promoted to professor. From 1951 to 1960, he served as dean of the College of Chemistry.

Pitzer was the third president of Rice University from 1961 until 1968 and sixth president of Stanford University from 1969 until 1971. His tenure at Stanford was turbulent due to student protests. Worn out by the confrontations, he announced his resignation in 1970 after a 19-month tenure. He returned to UC Berkeley in 1971. He retired in 1984, but continued research and scientific writing until his death.

Pitzer was director of research for the U.S. Atomic Energy Commission from 1949 to 1951 and a member of the National Academy of Sciences. He was elected to the American Philosophical Society in 1954 and the American Academy of Arts and Sciences in 1958.

As a scientist, Pitzer was known for his work on the thermodynamic properties of molecules. While still a graduate student he discovered that hydrocarbon molecules do not rotate unhindered around their C-C bonds. There is in fact a barrier to internal rotation, an important discovery upsetting the conventional wisdom and affecting the thermodynamic properties of hydrocarbons. Some of his work is summed up in the Pitzer equations describing the behavior of ions dissolved in water. During his long career he won many awards, most notably the National Medal of Science and the Priestley Medal. The Ohio Supercomputing System named their new cluster Pitzer in honour of Kenneth Pitzer.

In the public hearing that led to the revocation of Robert Oppenheimer's security clearance, Pitzer testified about his policy differences with Oppenheimer concerning the development of thermonuclear weapons.

== Personal life ==
Pitzer's father, Russell K. Pitzer, founded Pitzer College, one of the five Claremont Colleges in California. His son, Russell M. Pitzer is also a notable chemist who is currently retired from the faculty at Ohio State University.

== See also ==
- Acentric factor
- Pitzer equations
- Pitzer strain

== Books ==
- Rossini, Frederick D.; Pitzer, Kenneth S.; Arnett, Raymond L.; Braun, Rita M.; Pimentel, George C. (1953). Selected Values of Physical and Thermodynamic Properties of Hydrocarbons and Related Compounds: Comprising the Tables of the American Petroleum Institute Research Project 44 Extant as of December 31, 1952. Pittsburgh: Carnegie Press.
- Pitzer, Kenneth S. (1953). Quantum Chemistry. New York: Prentice-Hall.
- Pitzer, Kenneth S. (1995). Thermodynamics (3rd ed.). New York: McGraw-Hill. ISBN 0-07-050221-8. With acknowledgment to Gilbert Newton Lewis and Merle Randall, authors of the first edition, and to Leo Brewer, coauthor of the second edition.

Academic offices
Preceded by William Vermillion Houston	President of Rice University; 1961–1968	Succeeded by Norman Hackerman
Preceded by Robert Glaser (acting)	President of Stanford University; 1968–1970	Succeeded by Richard W. Lyman
