= Marianne Pitzen =

German artist

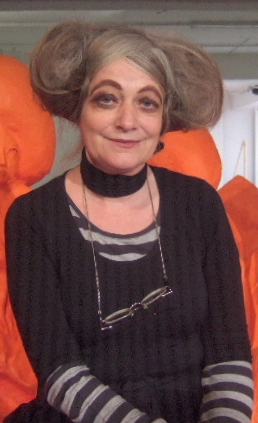
Marianne Pitzen

Marianne Pitzen (born 29 May 1948), GER, is a German artist born in Stuttgart. In 1981, Pitzen founded the Bonn Women's Museum, of which she is the current director. The museum hosts temporary exhibitions, and has hosted over 500 since its founding. Pitzen held her first exhibition in 1969, established a gallery in 1971, and later the "Circular" magazine with her husband.

== Life ==
Marianne Pitzen held her first solo exhibition in 1969. Three years later, she founded the ‘Circulus’ gallery, and in 1974, together with her husband Horst Pitzen, the magazine ‘Circular’. During this period, the groups ‘frauen formen ihre stadt’ and ‘Frau + Futura’ were formed. Her travelling exhibitions went to, amongst other places, Zurich (Le Cor-busier House), Innsbruck (Galerie Krinzinger) and Darmstadt (Technical University, Prof. Behnisch).

In 1981, she founded the world’s first Women’s Museum in Bonn. Today, she continues to be responsible for the museum’s conception and organisation. Marianne Pitzen is a member of the women artists’ group “zart & zackig”.

== Art-political actions in public spaces ==
- “Pro Bundeskanzlerin” (1997)
- Handbag action in New York (Metropolitan, Museum of Modern Art, Guggenheim, Whitney Muse-um) (1997)
- “Erhobenen Hauptes” action on 30 June at Documenta 11, Kassel (2002)

== Exhibitions ==
- 1991 Karl Ernst Osthaus-Museum, Hagen
- 1992 City Museum, Zwickau
- 1994 Städt. Gallery at the fish market, Erfurt
- 1998 City Museum Bonn
- 1999 Art Center, Ulaanbaatar
- 1999 Salzstadel of Regensburg
- 2001 Gallery Futura, Berlin
- 2001/02 art meeting digester, WWTW to Cologne
- 2008 MP 60, Bonn Women's Museum

== Honors and awards ==
- 2021 Rheinlandtaler from the Rhineland Regional Council
- 2014 Rebellious Woman of the Year by the Rebellious Women Founda-tion
- Federal Cross of Merit of the Federal Republic of Germany
- 1991 Woman of the Month, WDR 1

== Catalogs(Extract) ==
- Scripturale. Ein Projekt aus Kunst und Kultur. Frauenmuseum Bonn. 1988.
- Saarabande (Kuenstlerinnengruppe Saar). Frauenmuseum Bonn. 1988.
- Haut. Frauenmuseum Bonn. 1983.
- Umwelt - Naturkunst. Frauenmuseum Bonn. 1985.
- Ostara. Künstlerinnen aus dem anderen Berlin. Frauenmuseum Bonn. 1990.
- Die Rheinkonferenz. Zu Ökologie und Sagenwelt. Frauenmuseum Bonn. 1990.
- Zart + zackig - Friss oder stirb. Frauenmuseum Bonn. 1990.
- Konvergenzen. Frauenmuseum Bonn. 1991.
- Lady in Enzianblau. Frauenmuseum Bonn. 1992.
- Schwarzarbeit. Frauenmuseum Bonn. 1992.
- VALDIVIA. Göttin-Frau-Mythos. Frauenmuseum Bonn. 1992.
- Buch-ART. Buchobjekte europ. Kuenstlerinnen. Frauenmuseum Bonn. 1993.
- Gabriele-Muenter-Preis (2.). Frauenmuseum Bonn. 1997.
- Man wird nicht so stuermisch... begruesst (Studie; Bewerber. => 3.16). Frauenmuseum Bonn. 1997.
- Brust, Lust, Frust. Frauenmuseum Bonn. 1999.
- Paper Prayers. Kunst gegen Aids. Frauenmuseum Bonn. 2000.
- Ambivalenzen. Zeitgen. Künstlerinnen in Deutschland. Frauenmuseum Bonn. 2002.
- GLOBALIA. Globalisierung im Visier der Künstlerinnen. Frauenmuseum Bonn. 2004.
- Mythos Mutter. Frauenmuseum Bonn. 2005.
- Sexhandel. Mythen . Alltag . Gewalt. Frauenmuseum Bonn. 2006.
- Gabriele-Muenter-Preis 2007. Frauenmuseum Bonn. 2007.
- MP 60 - mehr als eine Retrospektive. Frauenmuseum Bonn. 2008.
- Frauenmuseen weltweit. Frauenmuseum Bonn. 2009.
- Gabriele-Muenter-Preis (6.) Vorreiterin. Frauenmuseum Bonn. 2010.
- Moneta. Frauen & Geld in Geschichte und Gegenwart. Frauenmuseum Bonn. 2010.
- Spanische Phase im Frauenmuseum. Frauenmuseum Bonn. 2011.
- Das Grüne Haus. Teil II: Unsere Verwandten: Pflanzen & Tiere. Frauenmuseum Bonn. 2012.
- Singl Moms (I). Alleinstehende Mütter und ihre Lebenswelten. Frauenmuseum Bonn. 2014.
- Female Colors. Mädchen- u. Frauenbilder Asiens; Berti Kamps. Frauenmuseum Bonn. 2016.
- Maskenball. Frauen in Corona-Zeiten. Frauenmuseum Bonn. 2020.
- Göttinnen im Rheinland. Frauenmuseum Bonn. 2021.
- Wir sind! Neue Frauenbewegung und feministische Kunst. Frauenmuseum Bonn. 2022.
