= Alexander White Pitzer =

- Born: Salem, Virginia
- Died: July 22, 1927 (aged 92)
- Citizenship: American
- Occupation(s): Presbyterian clergyman, author

Alexander White Pitzer (September 14, 1834 – July 22, 1927) was an American Presbyterian clergyman. He was the author of several books on theology, and was a professor of biblical history and literature at Howard University.

== Biography ==
Alexander White Pitzer was born in Salem, Virginia, on September 14, 1834. He attended Virginia Collegiate Institute (Roanoke College) and was graduated as valedictorian from Hampden–Sydney College in 1854, and at the Danville Theological Seminary, Kentucky, in 1857, after which he was pastor of Presbyterian churches in Leavenworth, Kansas, Sparta, Georgia, and Liberty, Virginia, and in 1868 organized the Central Presbyterian church in Washington, D.C., where he served until 1898.

From 1875, he was also a professor of biblical history and literature in Howard University in Washington, D.C. He was a member of the Prophetic convention in New York City in 1878, and assisted in drafting and reported the doctrinal testimony adopted by the conference. He took an active part in promoting the union of the northern and southern divisions of his church. He received the degree of Doctor of Divinity from Arkansas College in 1876.

He died on July 22, 1927, and is buried at East Hill Cemetery in Salem, Virginia.

== Works ==
In addition to numerous contributions to denominational literature, he is the author of Ecce Deus Homo, published anonymously (Philadelphia, 1867); Christ, Teacher of Men (1877); and The New Life not the Higher Life (1878); The Origin and Work of the Central Presbyterian Church, Washington, D.C.: A Discourse (1880); The Manifold Ministry of the Holy Spirit (1894); Why Believers Should "Not Fear" (1896).
