= Adja Ndeye Boury Ndiaye =

Senegalese writer (born 1936)

Adja Ndèye Boury Ndiaye (born April 18, 1936) is a Senegalese writer. Her married name is Gueye.

== Biography ==
She was born on April 18, 1936, in Dakar, where she attended primary and secondary school. She taught primary school for a year and then continued her studies in Besançon, France, followed by a year of studying paediatric nursing in Paris. She worked as a midwife for a time. Besides Senegal and France, she has also lived in Mauritania and the Ivory Coast and been on a pilgrimage to Mecca and Medina.

Her 1983 novel Collier de cheville received special mention at the Prix de la francophonie. It was also awarded the Grand Prix de la Première Dame du Sénégal by Éditions L'Harmattan. She also has published a children's book Diaxaï l'aigle et Niellé le moineau in 2003. One of her stories "La fiole" won the Radio France Internationale Concours de la Meilleure Nouvelle de Langue Française (Best French language story).

== Awards and honours ==
She was named a Knight in the Senegal National Order of Merit in 2009.
