= Russell M. Pitzer =

American theoretical chemist and educator (1938–2026)

Russell Mosher Pitzer (May 10, 1938 – May 25, 2026) was an American theoretical chemist and educator.

== Life and career ==
Russell Mosher Pitzer was born in Berkeley, California, on May 10, 1938. He attended public schools in this and the Washington, D.C. area. He received his B.S. in chemistry in 1959 from the California Institute of Technology, his A.M. in physics from Harvard University in 1963, and his Ph.D. in chemical physics from Harvard University in 1963.

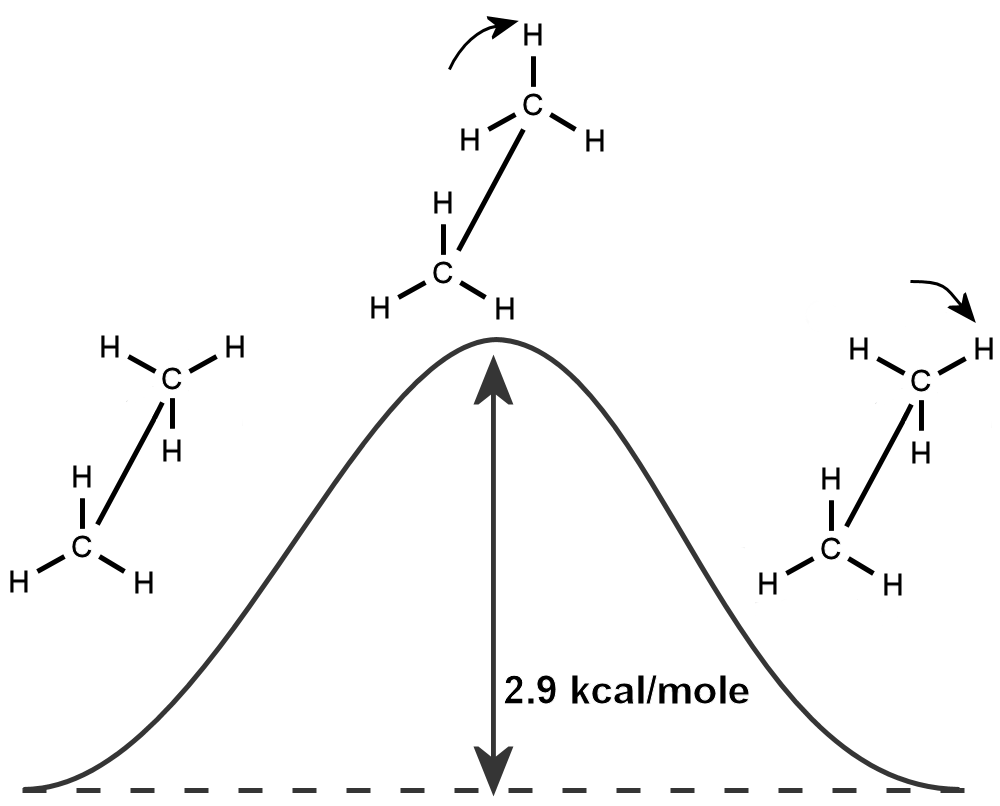
Ethane barrier to rotation about the carbon-carbon bond, first accurately calculated by Pitzer and Lipscomb.

At Harvard, Pitzer worked with William N. Lipscomb, Jr. in cooperation with the research group of John C. Slater at M.I.T. to develop computer programs to use Slater orbitals to produce self-consistent field (SCF) molecular orbitals.

The ethane barrier (see diagram at right) was first calculated accurately by Pitzer and Lipscomb using Hartree Fock Self-Consistent Field (SCF) theory. Ethane gives a classic, simple example of such a rotational barrier, the minimum energy to produce a 360-degree bond rotation of a molecular substructure. The three hydrogens at each end are free to pinwheel about the central carbon-carbon bond, provided that there is sufficient energy to overcome the barrier of the carbon-hydrogen bonds at each end of the molecule bumping into each other by way of overlap (exchange) repulsion.

Also at Harvard, Pitzer also helped formulate the perturbed Hartree–Fock equations in a form for calculating the effects of external electric and magnetic fields on molecules.

He was a postdoctoral fellow at M.I.T. and a faculty member at Caltech before joining the chemistry department at Ohio State University in 1968. He was promoted to professor in 1979 and served as department chair from 1989 to 1994.

His group wrote computer software to enable calculation of molecular energies and other properties. In 1979, with John Yates, he published the first Jahn-Teller-Effect study (on cobalt trifluoride, CoF_{3}) to use a computed energy surface. An early application with A. Chang was the first assignment of the visible spectrum of uranocene.

During 1986–87 he served as acting associate director of the Ohio Supercomputer Center, cofounding the center and the Ohio Academic Resources Network. During 2001–03 he served as interim director of the Ohio Supercomputer Center. In 2004 he received the Faculty Award For Distinguished University Service. He retired in 2008.

His father was former Stanford University president Kenneth Pitzer and his grandfather, Russell K. Pitzer, founded Pitzer College, one of the seven Claremont Colleges in California. Russell M. Pitzer served as a trustee of Pitzer College from 1988 to 2012, and in 2003 received a Doctor of Humane Letters honorary degree in recognition of this service. In 2018 the Ohio Supercomputer Center named their newly purchased supercomputer Pitzer in honor of his role in founding the center.

Pitzer died on May 25, 2026, at the age of 88.
