= Bonn Women's Museum =

Museum in Bonn, Germany

Coordinates: 50°44′27″N 7°05′33″E

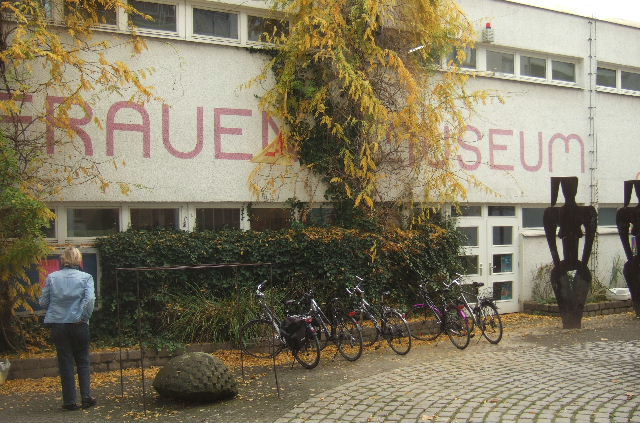
Bonn Women's Museum

Bonn Women's Museum

The Bonn Women's Museum (German: Frauenmuseum Bonn) is a women's museum in Bonn, Germany. It was founded in 1981 by Marianne Pitzen (the current director) and an interdisciplinary group of working women, and claims to be the first museum of its kind in the world. It hosts temporary exhibitions (over 500 since its founding) and accompanying events, and is run by the society "Women's Museum – Art, Culture, Research".

== Activities ==
The Women's Museum promotes women artists (both German and international) through a changing program of exhibitions, and examines their work in the context of art history. According to the museum, a number of artists who were first exhibited there have since established themselves on the world market. Female artists and academics work together on the large thematic exhibitions. Furthermore, women's history is examined in the context of new experimental art and through the events which accompany the exhibitions.

The museum's own collection includes works by Käthe Kollwitz, Katharina Sieverding, Valie Export, Maria Lassnig, and Yoko Ono. It also includes a library with an archive on specialist topics: women in art, history and politics; feminism; cultural politics; art of the 20th and 21st centuries; art since 1945; concrete and constructive art; and architecture and design.

The museum's academy organises meetings, seminars, workshops and advice services on topics of interest to female artists. Other research themes include the women's movement and gender politics. The work of the Bonn Women's Museum has led to the founding of women's museums elsewhere, for example in Merano, Italy and Hittisau, Austria (see Hittisau Women's Museum).

The museum is involved with the Gabriele Münter Prize for female artists. It also hosts art and design fairs, and has its own gallery, studios and publishing house. The Frauenmuseum Haus in Berlin is also connected with the Bonn Women's Museum.
