= Armand-Pierre Angrand =

Senegalese politician (1892–1964)

Armand Pierre Angrand (9 October 1892 – 29 August 1964) was a Senegalese politician, nobleman and writer and mayor of Gorée and Dakar in 1934. Son of Leopold Angrand (1859–1906), descendant of a prominent Métis Signares Goree. Grand son of Pierre Angrand (1820 -?), a rich merchant and shipowner and Helene de Saint-Jean (1826–1859), granddaughter of Estoupan of St. John, who signed the capitulation of Gorée 1758 against the British.

He wrote a basic guide for the Europeans (French, Wolof Manual, foreword by Theodore Monod),. Armand-Pierre Angrand was also a correspondent in the Senegal Universal Negro Improvement Association (UNIA) movement founded by Marcus Garvey.

== See also ==
- List of mayors of Dakar
- Timeline of Dakar
