= Russell K. Pitzer =

Russell Kelly Pitzer (September 3, 1878 – July 1978) was an American orange grower and philanthropist. He was the founder of Pitzer College in Claremont, California, an early benefactor of the Pomona Valley Community Hospital (now the Pomona Valley Hospital Medical Center) in Pomona, and a noted philanthropist of other local causes in the Pomona Valley.

Russell Kelly Pitzer was born in Mills County, Iowa, the youngest of four children of Samuel Collins Pitzer and Alice Kelly Pitzer. The family moved to Brown County, Nebraska and Boulder, Colorado, before settling in Pomona, California. He attended Pomona College in Claremont, California, graduating in the class of 1900. He then attended Hastings Law School in San Francisco, a unit of the University of California, Berkeley. Upon receiving his law degree in 1903, he returned to Pomona and joined a law firm in Pomona, later serving a term as city attorney in Claremont. In 1912 he purchased an orange grove, soon developed a successful business as the owner of many citrus groves, and reduced his activity as a lawyer. He also became a principal in the Pomona Valley Telephone and Telegraph Union and the Home Builders Savings and Loan Association.

As he acquired the resources to be a public benefactor, he became active in supporting Pomona Valley Community Hospital and the Claremont Colleges, participating in the founding of Claremont Men's College (now Claremont McKenna College) and Harvey Mudd College. In 1963 he took the lead in founding Pitzer College, and accordingly, Pitzer College chose the orange tree as its symbol.

In 1903 he married Flora Sanborn, and they had one child, Kenneth S. Pitzer in 1914. Flora S. Pitzer died in 1927 and he subsequently married Ina Scott.

== See also ==
- Kenneth S. Pitzer, his son, a notable scientist and academic
- Russell M. Pitzer, his grandson, a notable scientist and academic
